= Missouri Route 13 =

State highway in Missouri, U.S.

Route 13
- MO 13 highlighted in red

Route information
- Maintained by MoDOT
- Length: 290.601 mi (467.677 km)
- Existed: 1922–present

Major junctions
- South end: AR 21 in Blue Eye
- US 60 / US 160 in Springfield; Route 413 in Springfield; I-44 in Springfield; US 54 in Collins; Route 7 / Route 18 / Route 52 in Clinton; US 50 in Warrensburg; I-70 / US 40 near Higginsville; US 24 / Route 224 in Lexington; US 36 / Route 110 (CKC) in Hamilton; I-35 in Bethany
- North end: US 69 / US 136 in Bethany

Location
- Country: United States
- State: Missouri

Highway system
- Missouri State Highway System; Interstate; US; State; Supplemental
← Route 12	→ Route 14

Route 13 is a highway in western Missouri which runs almost the entire north–south length of the state. Its northern terminus is at U.S. Route 69/136 in Bethany. Its southern terminus is at the Arkansas state line in downtown Blue Eye, Missouri–Arkansas where it continues as Highway 21. It is one of the original state highways of Missouri.

The road serves as an important corridor between Springfield and Kansas City, two of the three largest cities in the state. Heading north from Springfield, Route 13 intersects Route 7 at Clinton which in turn carries traffic to Interstate 49/U.S. Route 71 at Harrisonville. I-49/US 71 then continues on into downtown Kansas City. Route 13, Route 7, and I-49/US 71 now provide a four-lane highway (much of it expressway) between Springfield and Kansas City since the completion of the final widening project between Collins and Clinton.

Several sections from north of Reeds Spring through Branson West have been widened, rebuilt, moved, and renamed to help ease traffic congestion through the towns. Drivers regularly use these routes to get to many of the lakes in southern Missouri and this has caused a major headache in recent years. One section of road has been renamed Route 413 and travels north to Springfield. In June 2009, the nation's first diverging diamond interchange, a style of interchange where traffic crosses to the left-side of the road, opened to traffic. The interchange is located at the I-44/MO-13 junction in Springfield.

In 2006 the portion through Caldwell County, Missouri was named the Zack Wheat Memorial Highway in honor of the Baseball Hall of Fame player.

== Route description ==
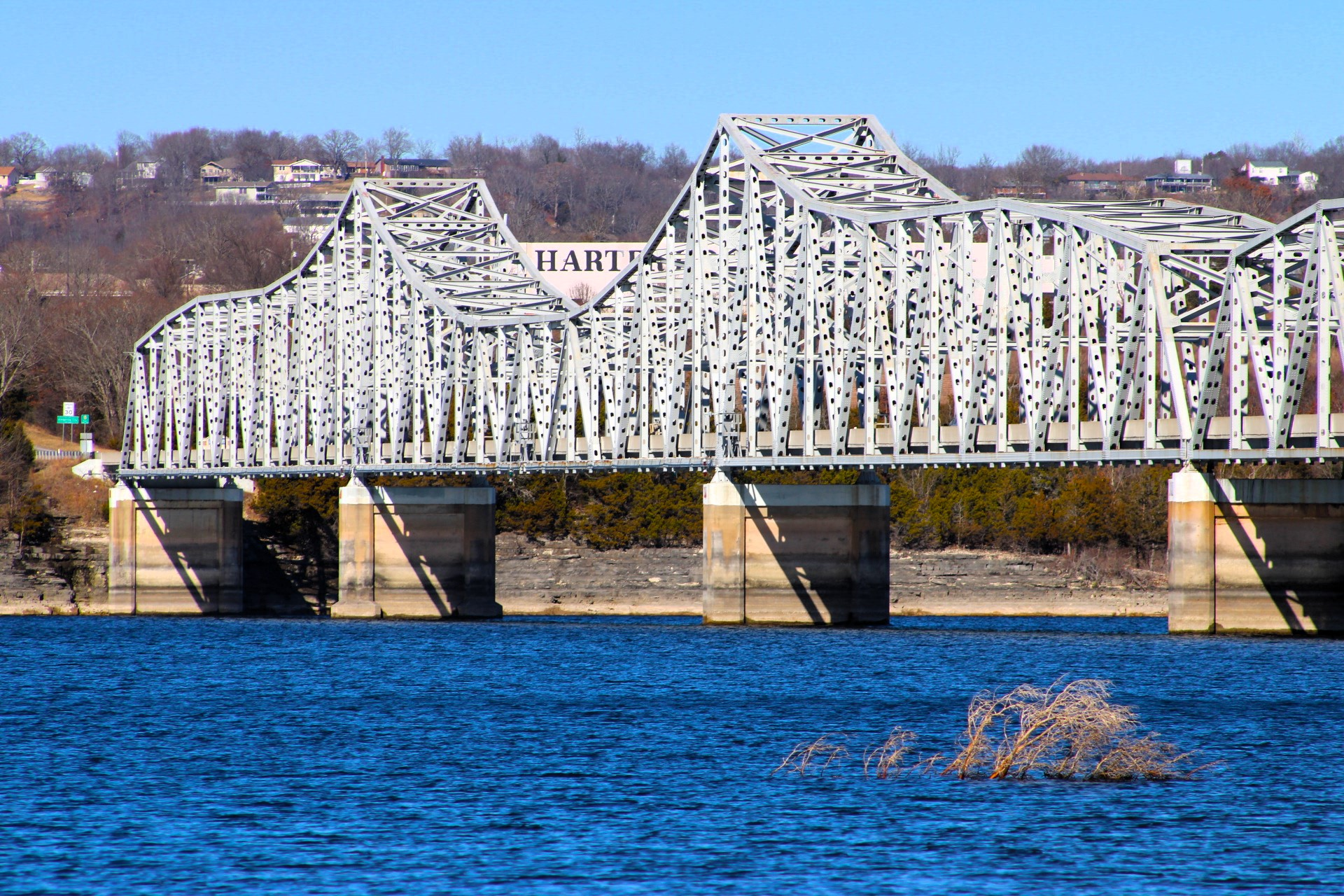
Route 13 crossing Table Rock Lake.

Route 13 begins at the Arkansas state line in Blue Eye. After leaving the town, it travels through the rugged countryside of the southwest Missouri Ozarks, part of the Mark Twain National Forest. Route 13 forms a 3-mile-long (4.8 km) concurrency with Route 86 before bridging Table Rock Lake south of the town of Kimberling City. In Branson West, it leaves the national forest and forms a concurrency with Route 76 and Route 265. North of this, Route 13 travels concurrently with Route 248 for 2 miles (3.2 km). At Reeds Spring Junction is the southern terminus of Route 413, and old alignment of Route 13, changed in the early 2000s. Also at Reeds Spring Junction, U.S. Route 160 (US 160) joins to form another concurrency with Route 13. This intersection is in the planning phase to be a roundabout. Spokane, the two highways are joined by a third, Route 176.

US 160 and Route 13 intersect Route 14 in Nixa. The two highways continue north into Greene County, where they enter Springfield traveling along Campbell Avenue. At the James River Freeway, US 160 and Route 13 turn off Campbell to travel along the freeway with US 60. Route 13 splits off the freeway at the next exit to turn north along Kansas Expressway. At Sunshine Street is the northern terminus of Route 413. On the north side of Springfield, Route 13 crosses Route 744 (Kearney Street) and Interstate 44 (I-44) less than 1 mile (1.6 km) north. It then passes near the Ozark Empire Fairgrounds and the Dickerson Park Zoo and leaves the city as a divided highway. A project begun in 2009 and completed on June 21 of that year, turned the existing I-44 interchange into a diverging diamond, which was the first of its kind in the nation. In addition to costing $2.5 million compared to around $8 million for a complete rebuild, this has also helped ease congestion at the interchange by making lefts onto the on-ramps "free lefts" by lanes shifting into opposite lanes when passing over the bridge. South of Bolivar, the divided highway continues as 4 lanes all the way to Springfield

- Old data((splits apart, with the northbound lanes being the older highway, though an even older alignment travels further to the east. Because of the situation, numerous "Do not enter" signs are posted to help prevent local traffic from driving on the wrong lanes of the highway. Near Brighton is a short concurrency with Route 215. Construction began in summer of 2008 to build new northbound lanes next to the straighter southbound lanes. This project was completed in 2010 and the old northbound lanes will be designated county roads when the project is completed.))

At Bolivar, in addition to the interchange with Route 32, is another business route. The business route ends, along with Route 83 at an interchange on the southern part of the town. South of Humansville is the intersection with Route 123. At Collins is an interchange with US 54. At Osceola, Route 13 crosses a branch of the Harry S. Truman Reservoir.

At Deepwater, Route 13 forms a concurrency with Route 52. The two highways cross Harry S. Truman Reservoir twice before heading into Clinton. Route 13 and Route 52 serve as the eastern terminus of Route 18. Route 7 joins the concurrency at the same intersection, and the three highways continue around the northeastern part of the town, where Route 52 splits off, and eventually Route 7 and Route 13 go their separate ways.

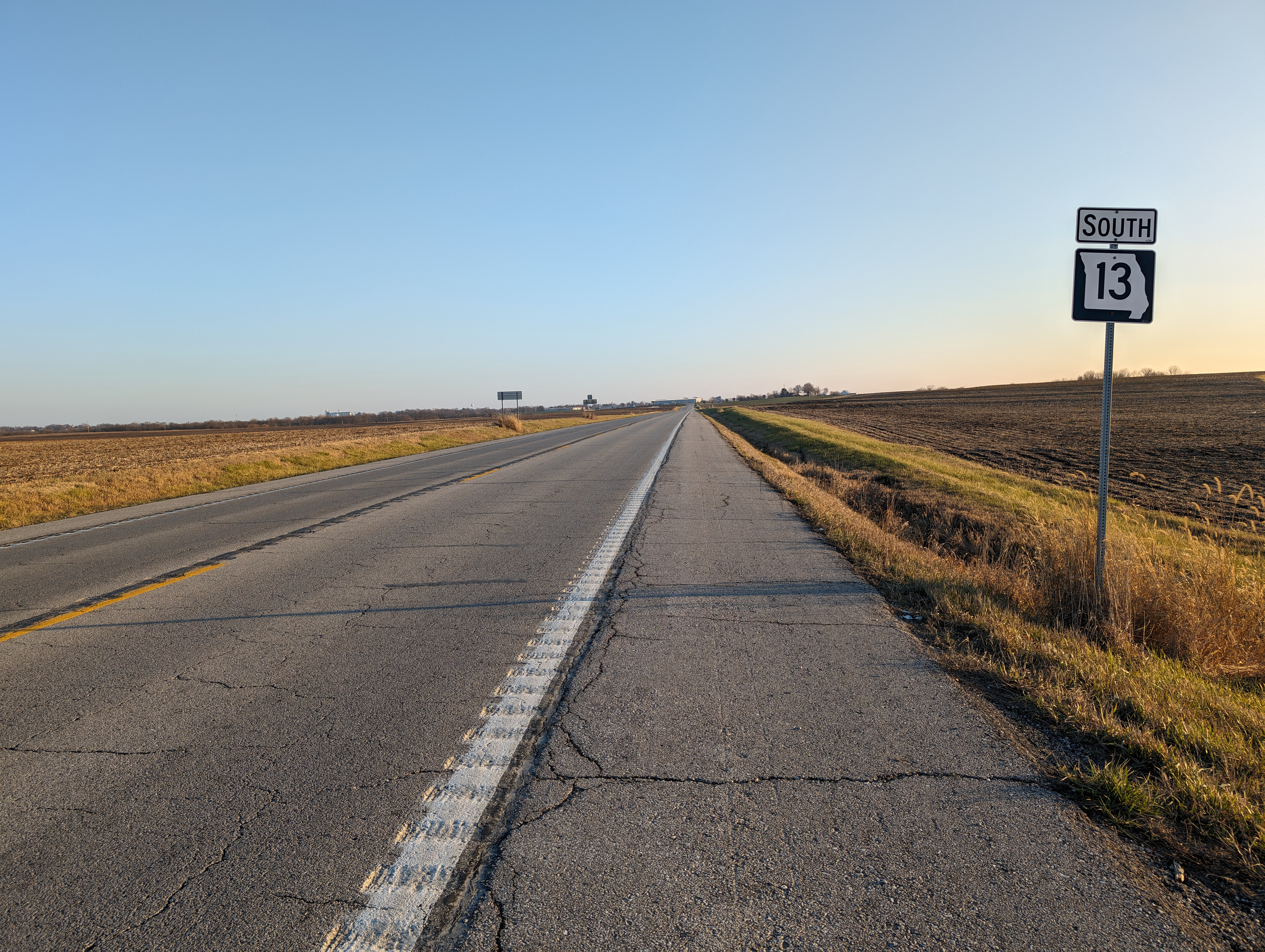
Route 13 north of Higginsville

North of Post Oak, the highway has an intersection with Route 2. East of Warrensburg is an intersection with US 50. South of Higginsville, Route 13 crosses I-70/US 40. At Higginsville is the western terminus of Route 20.

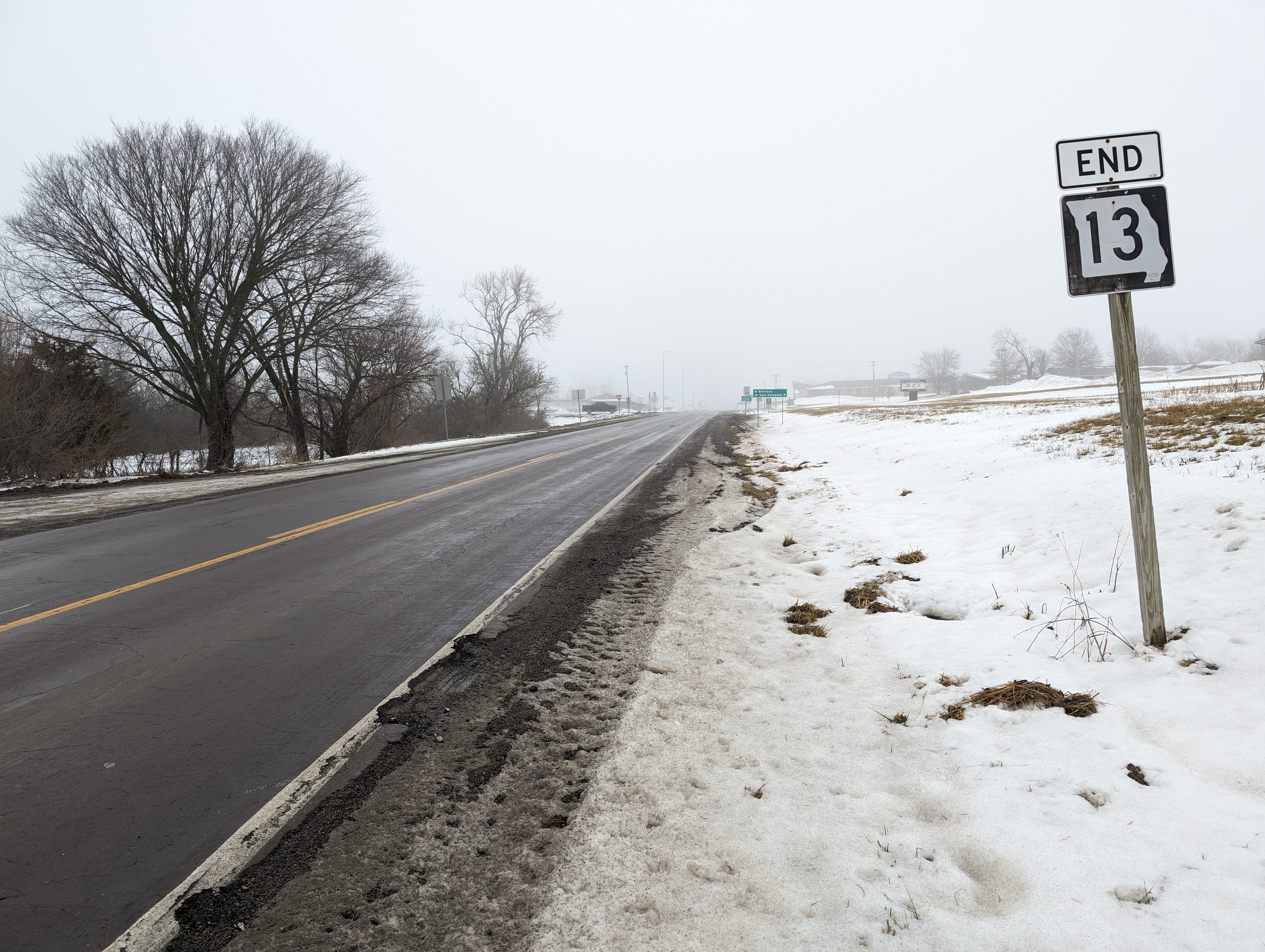
The northern terminus of Route 13

Route 13 then forms a complicated interchange with US 24 and Route 224 east of Lexington, the site of a Civil War battlefield, then crosses the Missouri River. From US 24 in Lexington to the intersection with Route 10 in Richmond, the highway is a four-lane limited access road. North of Richmond, it returns to a two-lane highway flanked by crop land. At Polo the road forms a short concurrency with Route 116, and further north, at Hamilton is an intersection with US 36. Near Gallatin, it turns east forming a concurrency with Route 6 for 3 miles (4.8 km), then turns north again. A few miles north is an interchange with I-35. Then, Route 13 ends at US 69/US 136 in Bethany.

== History ==
The original southern terminus of the highway (as laid out in 1922) was at Route 71 (now U.S. Route 65) in Buffalo. By 1925, it was realigned to absorb the Bolivar-Springfield Route 69, which had been created in 1922; the former piece from Bolivar to Buffalo became an extension of Route 66, which became part of US 54 in 1927 (and is now part of Route 32). Route 13 took over Route 43, established in 1922 from Marionville south to the Arkansas state line, in about 1930.

Route 123 is the old alignment of Route 13 between Humansville and Fair Play, where Route 13 turned east on to what is now Route 32 (Route 64 prior to 1956) back to Bolivar.

== Major intersections ==
All exits are unnumbered.

County	Location	mi	km	Destinations	Notes
Stone	Blue Eye	0.000	0.000	AR 21 south – Blue Eye	Continuation into Arkansas
Stone	Blue Eye	0.985	1.585	Route 86 east to US 65	Southern end of Route 86 overlap. Access to Table Rock Lake.
Stone		3.817	6.143	Route 86 west – Carr Lane	Northern end of Route 86 overlap
Stone	Stoneridge	14.427	23.218	Business 13	Interchange; northbound exit and southbound entrance; provides U-turn onto Route 13 south. Access to Stoneridge Business District.
Stone	Branson West	17.088	27.500	Purist Lane / Business 13 north	
Stone	Branson West	17.902	28.810	Route 76 east / Route 265 south – Branson West	Southern end of Route 76 / Route 265 overlap
Stone	Branson West	18.759	30.190	Route 265 north / Route 413 north / Business 13 south – Reeds Spring	Northern end of Route 265 overlap
Stone	Reeds Spring	20.556	33.082	Route 76 north – Reeds Spring, Cape Fair	Northern end of Route 76 overlap
Stone	Reeds Spring	22.564	36.313	Route 248 west – Reeds Spring	Southern end of Route 248 overlap
Stone	Reeds Spring Junction	23.360	37.594	US 160 east / Route 248 – Branson	Northern end of Route 248 overlap; southern end of US 160 overlap
Christian		27.995	45.054	Route 176 west – Galena	Southern end of Route 176 overlap
Christian	Spokane	30.612	49.265	Route 176 east – Spokane	Northern end of Route 176 overlap
Christian	Nixa	44.087	70.951	Route 14 (Mount Vernon Street) – Clever, Ozark	
Greene	Springfield	50.527	81.315	US 60 east (James River Freeway) – Rogersville	Interchange; southern end of US 60 overlap
Greene	Springfield	52.044	83.757	US 60 west / US 160 west (James River Freeway) – Republic	Diverging diamond interchange; northern end of US 60 / US 160 overlap; converted from existing Interchange August 18, 2013
Greene	Springfield	53.254	85.704	Battlefield Road	Access to Battlefield Mall
Greene	Springfield	54.824	88.231	Route 413 / Sunshine Street – Republic	Access to Mercy Hospital and Bass Pro Shops
Greene	Springfield	57.079	91.860	I-44 BL (Chestnut Expressway)	
Greene	Springfield	58.915	94.815	Route 744 / Historic US 66 (Kearney Street)	
Greene	Springfield			I-44 east – Rolla	Proposed flyover; southbound access only
Greene	Springfield	59.563	95.857	I-44 – Joplin, Rolla	I-44 exit 77; first diverging diamond interchange in the United States
Greene	Springfield	59.749	96.157	Norton Road	Access to Ozark Empire Fairgrounds and Dickerson Park Zoo
Greene		64.099	103.157	Route O west – Willard, Glidewell	
Greene		65.607	105.584	Route WW east	
Greene		70.518	113.488	Route BB west / Route CC – Walnut Grove, Fair Grove	
Polk	Brighton	74.543	119.965	Route 215 south – Pleasant Hope, Brighton	Southern end of Route 215 overlap
Polk		75.437	121.404	Route 215 north / Route 215 Spur east – Morrisville	Northern end of Route 215 overlap
Polk	Bolivar	83.057	133.667	Route 13 Bus. north / Route 83 north – Bolivar	South end of freeway
Polk	Bolivar	85.291	137.263	Route T west – Bolivar, Aldrich	
Polk	Bolivar	86.877	139.815	Route 13 Bus. south / Route 32 – Bolivar, Fair Play	North end of freeway
Polk	Humansville	99.009	159.340	Route 123 south / Route 13 Bus. north – Dunnegan, Humansville	
Polk	Humansville	101.621	163.543	Route 13 Bus. south / Route N west – Humansville, Caplinger Mills	Interchange
St. Clair		108.871	175.211	US 54 – Collins	Interchange
St. Clair		119.944	193.031	Route 82 north / Route 13 Bus. – Osceola, Harper	
St. Clair	Osceola	120.944	194.641	Route 13 Bus. south	
Henry		135.711	218.406	Route 52 west – Montrose	Interchange; southern end of Route 52 overlap
Henry		136.710	220.013	Route 52 Bus. west – Deepwater	
Henry	Clinton	143.782	231.395	Route 7 south / Route 18 west – Clinton, Warsaw	Southern end of Route 7 overlap. Access to Historic Downtown Clinton.
Henry	Clinton	145.224	233.715	Route 52 east – Calhoun, Windsor	Interchange; northern end of Route 52 overlap
Henry	Clinton	146.122	235.161	Route 7 north / Route 13 Bus. south – Harrisonville, Clinton	Northern end of Route 7 overlap
Johnson		160.870	258.895	Route 2 – Chilhowee, Leeton	
Johnson	Warrensburg	169.265	272.406	Route 13 Bus. north – Warrensburg	Roundabout
Johnson	Warrensburg	173.153	278.663	Route DD – Warrensburg	Roundabout. Access to Whiteman Air Force Base.
Johnson	Warrensburg	175.230	282.005	US 50 – Lee's Summit, Jefferson City	Interchange
Johnson	Warrensburg	180.184	289.978	Route 13 Bus. south – Warrensburg	Roundabout
Lafayette	Higginsville	192.308	309.490	I-70 / US 40 – Kansas City, Columbia	I-70 exit 49. Access to Maple Leaf Lake Conservation.
Lafayette	Higginsville	196.968	316.989	Route 13 Bus. north (Fairground Avenue)	Access to Higginsville Industrial Municipal Airport and Downtown Business District
Lafayette		199.151	320.502	Route 13 Bus. south / Route 20 east – Higginsville	Access to Confederate Memorial State Historic Site, Missouri Veterans State Cemetery, and Higginsville Industrial Municipal Airport
Lafayette		204.736	329.491	Route 13 Bus. north	
Lafayette	Lexington	207.651	334.182	US 24 / Lewis and Clark Trail east – Lexington, Waverly	South end of freeway
Lafayette	Lexington	207.847	334.497	Route 224 west / Route 13 Bus. south – Lexington	Access to Lafayette Regional Health Center and Access to Battle of Lexington State Historic Site
Missouri River		209.358	336.929	Congressman Ike Skelton Bridge	
Ray		211.535	340.433	Route J – Hardin	
Ray	Henrietta	214.571	345.319	Henrietta	
Ray	Richmond	216.848	348.983	Route 10 / Route 13 Bus. north / Lewis and Clark Trail west – Excelsior Springs, Carrollton	North end of freeway
Ray	Richmond	217.741	350.420	Route 10 Bus. / Route 13 Bus. south – Excelsior Springs, Hardin	Access to Business District
Caldwell	Polo	237.454	382.145	Route 116 west – Lathrop	Southern end of Route 116 overlap
Caldwell		238.460	383.764	Route 116 east – Cowgill, Braymer	Northern end of Route 116 overlap
Caldwell	Hamilton	250.520	403.173	US 36 Bus. begins / US 36 / Route 110 (CKC) – Cameron, Chillicothe	Interchange; southern end of US 36 Bus. overlap
Caldwell	Hamilton	251.161	404.204	US 36 Bus. west (Berry Street)	Northern end of US 36 Bus. overlap
Daviess	Gallatin	264.896	426.309	Route 6 west – Altamont	Southern end of Route 6 overlap
Daviess		266.531	428.940	Route 6 east – Jamesport	Northern end of Route 6 overlap
Harrison		287.300	462.365	I-35 – Kansas City, Des Moines	I-35 exit 88
Harrison	Bethany	290.601	467.677	US 69 south / US 136 west – Bethany, New Hampton	Northern terminus; highway continues as US 69 north / US 136 east
1.000 mi = 1.609 km; 1.000 km = 0.621 mi: Concurrency terminus; Incomplete access

== Route 13 Business ==

- Richmond
- Lexington
- Higginsville
- Warrensburg
- Clinton
- Osceola
- Collins
- Humansville
- Bolivar
- Branson West

== See also ==
- List of state highways in Missouri
