= Missouri Route 265 =

State highway in Missouri, U.S.

Route 265
- MO 265 highlighted in red

Route information
- Maintained by MoDOT
- Length: 66.975 mi (107.786 km)

Major junctions
- South end: US 65 south of Branson
- US 60 from Marionville to Aurora
- North end: I-44 / I-44 BL / Route 39 in Mount Vernon

Location
- Country: United States
- State: Missouri

Highway system
- Missouri State Highway System; Interstate; US; State; Supplemental
← Route 254	→ Route 266

Route 265 is a highway in southwestern Missouri. Its northern terminus is at Interstate 44 in Mount Vernon; its southern terminus is at U.S. Route 65 (for which it was numbered after) south of Branson. Much of the highway is concurrent with other routes (including Route 39, U.S. Route 60, Route 413, Route 13, Route 76, and Route 165). It is also known as the Ozark Mountain Parkway.

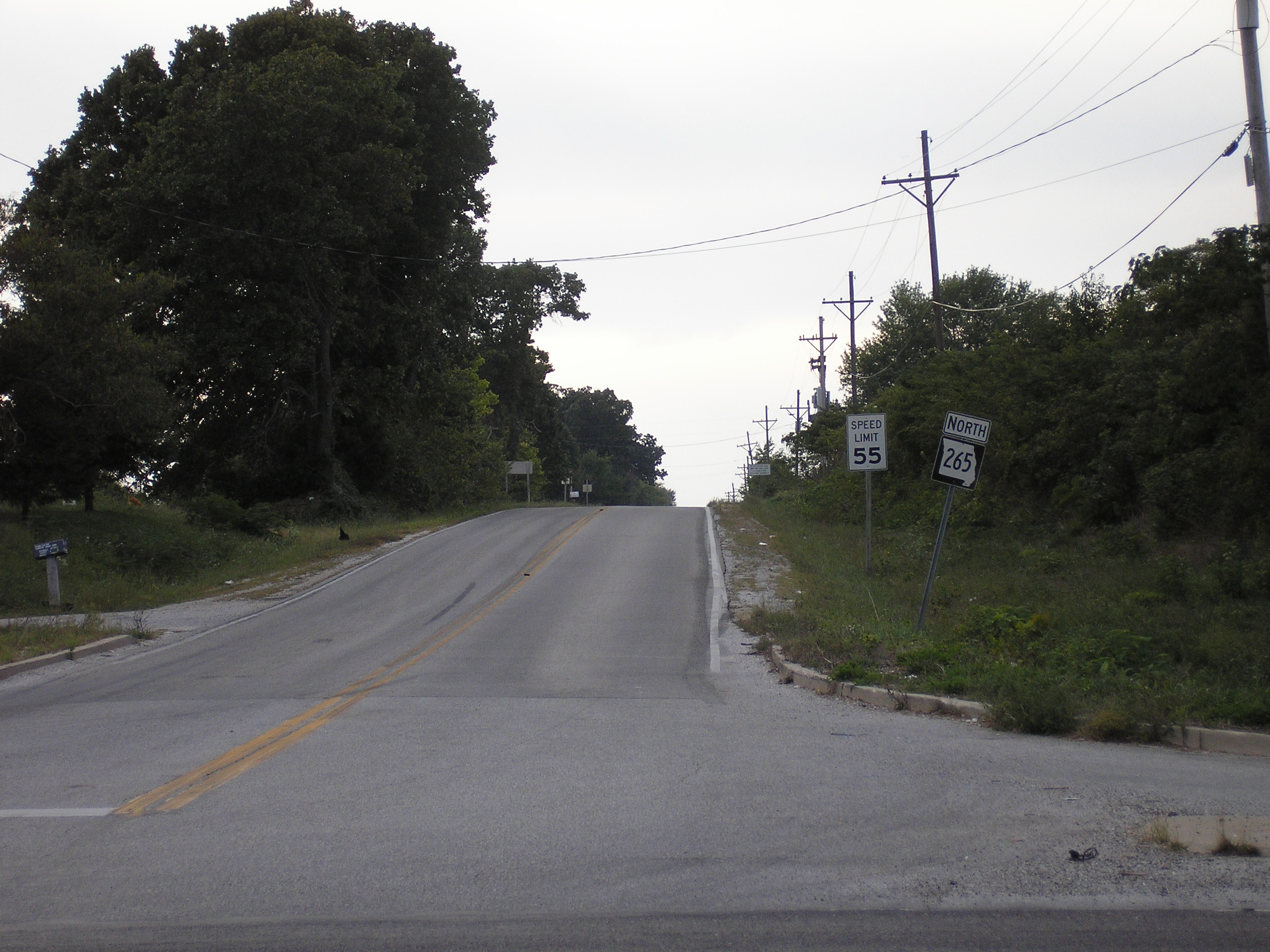
Route 265 east of Marionville at its junction with Route 413. This three-mile section is one of 3 short sections of the highway not concurrent with another highway, the other two being 5.6 miles from Route 76 to Route 165, near Table Rock Dam, and 3.2 miles from Route 165 to US 65 at its southern terminus.

== Major intersections ==
County	Location	mi	km	Destinations	Notes
Taney	Oliver Township	0.000	0.000	US 65 – Branson, Harrison	Southern terminus; road continues north as Cedar Valley Road
Taney	Oliver Township	3.217	5.177	CR 165 south Route 165 begins	Southern end of Route 165 / CR 165 overlap
Taney	Branson	7.264	11.690	Route 165 north / CR 165 north	Northern end of Route 165 / CR 165 overlap
Taney	Branson Township	9.730	15.659	Route 376 east – Attractions	
Stone	Sunset Cove–Ruth township line	12.851	20.682	Route 76 east – Branson	Southern end of Route 76 overlap
Stone	Branson West	16.938	27.259	Route 13 south – Kimberling City	Southern end of Route 13 overlap
Stone	Reeds Spring	17.795	28.638	Route 13 north / Route 76 west – Spokane Route 413 begins	Northern end of Route 13 and Route 76 overlaps; southern end of Route 413 overlap
Stone	Reeds Spring	19.747	31.780	Route 76 – Cape Fair	
Stone	Reeds Spring	21.353	34.364	Route 248 east	Southern end of Route 248 overlap
Stone	Galena	28.922	46.545	Route 176 east	
Stone	Galena	29.306	47.163	Route 248 west – Galena, Cassville	Southern end of Route 248 overlap
Stone	Elsey	34.340	55.265	Route 173 south – Cape Fair	
Stone–Christian county line	Grant–West Polk– East Polk township tripoint	45.310	72.919	Route 413 north – Billings	North end of Route 413 overlap
Lawrence	Marionville	48.446	77.966	US 60 east to Route 14	Southern end of US 60 overlap
Lawrence	Aurora	52.266	84.114	US 60 Bus. west – Aurora	
Lawrence	Aurora	54.484	87.683	US 60 west / Route 39 south to Route 248 – Monett	Northern end of US 60 overlap; southern end of Route 39 overlap
Lawrence	Aurora	56.053	90.209	US 60 Bus. (Church Street)	
Lawrence	Mount Vernon Township	66.840– 66.975	107.569– 107.786	I-44 – Springfield, Joplin I-44 BL west / Route 39 north (Mt. Vernon Boulevard)	Northern terminus; northern end of Route 39 overlap; highway continues as I-44 BL west/Rte. 39 north (Mt. Vernon Blvd.)
1.000 mi = 1.609 km; 1.000 km = 0.621 mi: Concurrency terminus
