= Dry Creek (Flat Creek tributary) =

Stream in the American state of Missouri

Dry Creek is a stream in the U.S. state of Missouri. It is a tributary of Flat Creek.

The stream headwaters are at 36°50′27″N 93°38′10″W and its confluence with Flat Creek is at 36°46′15″N 93°31′57″W. The stream source is west of Elsey and it flows south-south-east parallel to and west of Missouri Route 173. It crosses under Missouri Route 248 west of Cross Roads and continues on to enter the Flat Creek arm of Table Rock Lake.

Dry Creek was so named because it often runs dry.

== See also ==
- List of rivers of Missouri
