= Missouri Route 465 =

Former state highway in Missouri, U.S.

Route 465
- Ozark Mountain Highroad
- The path where route 465 used to run before being decommissioned

Route information
- Maintained by MoDOT
- Length: 7.557 mi (12.162 km)
- Existed: 2003–2020

Major junctions
- South end: Route 76 west of Branson
- Route 248 north of Branson
- North end: US 65 / Route F north of Branson

Location
- Country: United States
- State: Missouri

Highway system
- Missouri State Highway System; Interstate; US; State; Supplemental
← I-435	→ I-470

Route 465 was a short highway in southern Missouri. It followed Ozark Mountain Highroad northwest of Branson. The southern terminus was at Route 76, while the northern terminus was at U.S. Route 65 north of Branson. There were plans to eventually reconnect the route to US 65.

== Route description ==
Route 465 began at an interchange with Route 76 northwest of Branson in Stone County. A stub of the freeway with ghost ramps continues a short distance south of the interchange. From the junction with Route 76, the four-lane freeway headed north through wooded hilly areas, curving to the northeast. The median widened and the road entered Taney County before heading to the north again. The route turned to the east, the median narrowing before an interchange with Route 248. Past this interchange, the highway continued east through more rural areas. The freeway ended as the road came to an at-grade intersection with Adair Road. Route 465 went east as a four-lane undivided road for a short distance before ending at an interchange with US 65, where Route 76 now leaves the Highroad to run concurrently along US 65 to downtown Branson. The road continues past US 65 as Route F.

== History ==
Route 465 opened to traffic in June 2003. There were plans to extend Ozark Mountain Road back to US 65. Missouri Department of Transportation (MoDot) owns the right of way for the unbuilt portion. There are no plans to extend the highway due to lack of funding but the right way is already acquired.

In order for the city of Branson to obtain the "strip" of Branson between Route 376 and US 65, Route 76 was routed on to the Highroad and US 65 between the Highroad and 76 Country Boulevard. As Route 76 was re-aligned on to the entirety of the highroad, Route 465 was decommissioned. Work to replace the old signage started on January 6, 2020, and was projected to end in March 2020. The segment of Route 76 between the now city-maintained part of 76 Country Boulevard and the Highroad is now an extension of Route 376.

== Major intersections ==
All exits were unnumbered.

County	Location	mi	km	Destinations	Notes
Stone				Ozark Mountain Highroad south	Unbuilt continuation beyond Route 76
Stone		0.000	0.000	Route 76 (76 Country Blvd) / Route 376 – Branson West, Branson	Southern terminus; partial interchange; southbound traffic exit
Taney		4.674	7.522	Route 248 – Branson, Reeds Spring	
Taney		7.294	11.739	West Outer Road (Adair Road)	At-grade intersection; north end of freeway
Taney		7.488– 7.557	12.051– 12.162	US 65 – Springfield, Branson	Interchange; northern terminus
Taney		7.488– 7.557	12.051– 12.162	Route F	Continuation east beyond US 65
1.000 mi = 1.609 km; 1.000 km = 0.621 mi: Unopened
