= Y-Bridge (Galena, Missouri) =

Historic bridge in Missouri, United States

- Y Bridge
- U.S. National Register of Historic Places
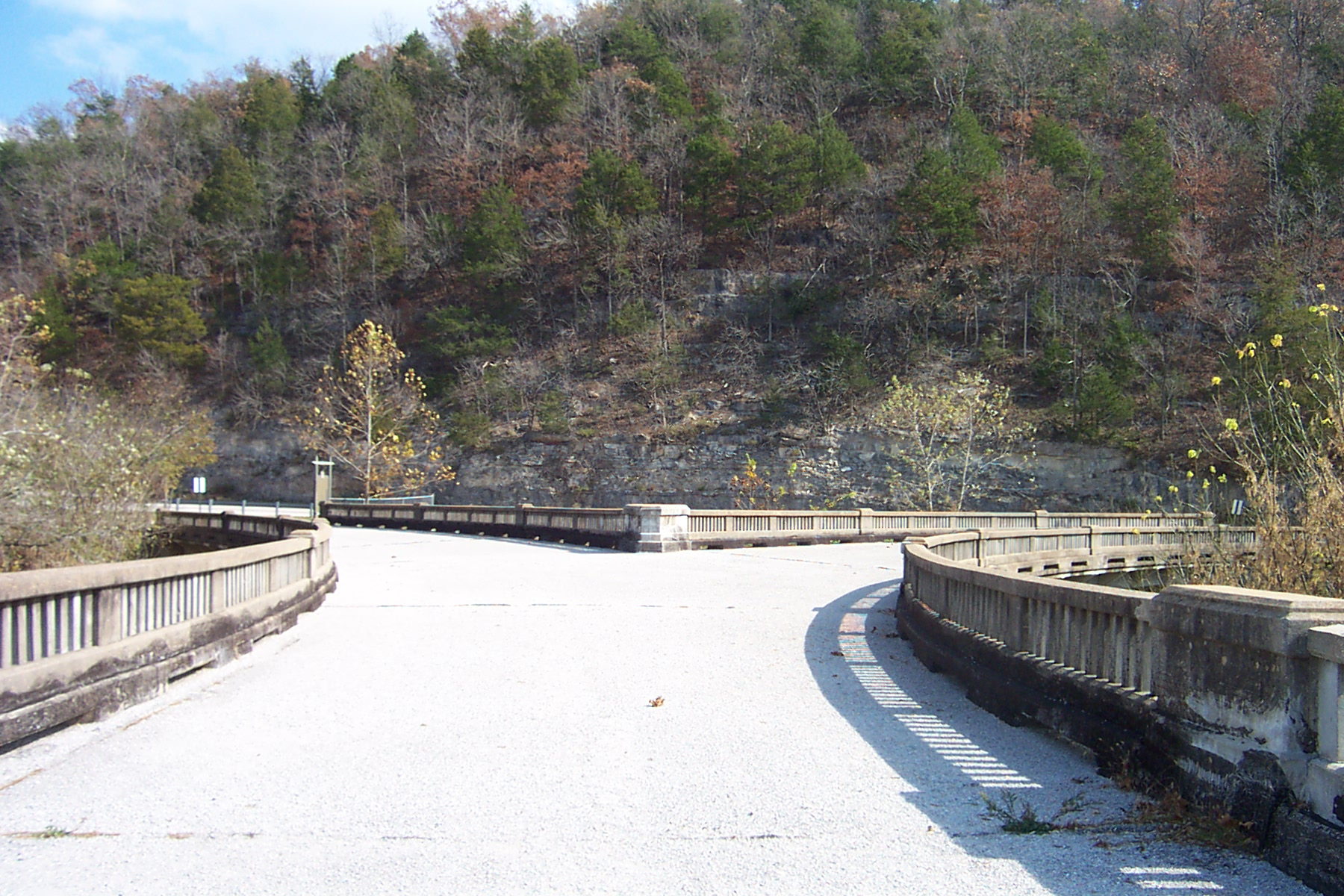
- The Y-Bridge looking east. Former Route 43 continued right, former Route 44 continued left.

- Location within Missouri Location within the United States
- Location: Jct. of MO 44 and 13, across the James R., Galena, Missouri
- Coordinates: 36°48′18″N 93°27′41″W
- Area: 3.3 acres (1.3 ha)
- Built: 1926
- Built by: Bureau of Bridges, Missouri Hwy.Dept.
- Architectural style: Art Deco, Open spandrel arch Y bridge
- NRHP reference No.: 91000591
- Added to NRHP: May 23, 1991

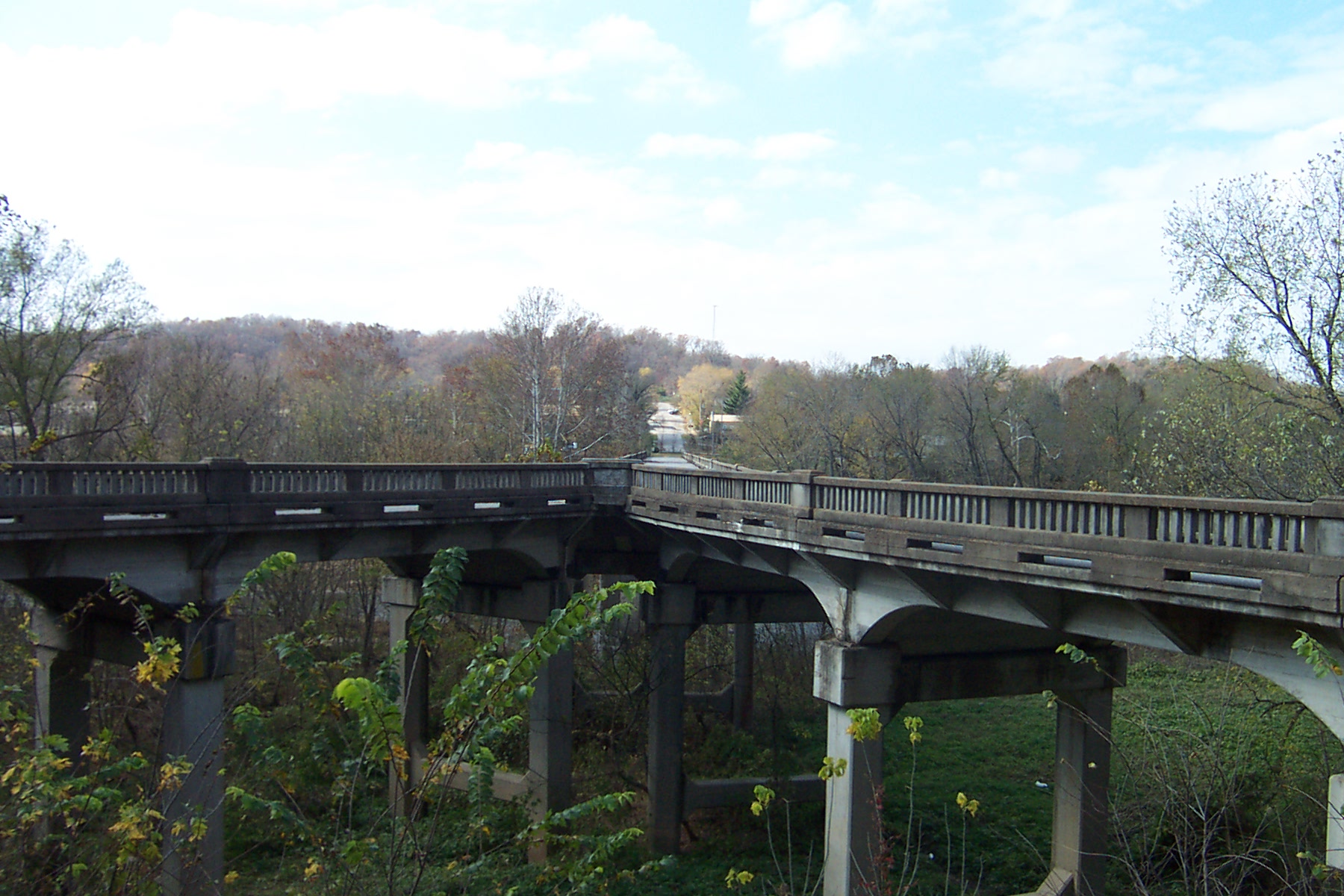
The Y-Bridge looking west toward downtown Galena.

The Y-Bridge is an old highway bridge over the James River located at Galena, Stone County, Missouri, and opened in 1927. This three-way bridge is named the Y-Bridge because it is shaped like the letter "Y". The bridge is such that (going east), one could then either head north or south upon reaching the east end, where the highway was between a steep bluff on the east and the river on the west. It was built to accommodate Routes 13 and 44, now Routes 413 and 248.

The bridge is now closed to vehicles and has been placed on the National Register of Historic Places. A newer bridge to the north carries traffic over the river.

== See also ==
- Margaret Bridge
