= Flat Creek (James River tributary) =

Location
- Country: United States
- State: Missouri
- Region: Barry and Stone counties

Physical characteristics
- Source
  - coordinates: 36°36′19″N 93°57′48″W
  - elevation: 1,460 ft (450 m)
- Mouth
  - coordinates: 36°44′35″N 93°30′24″W
  - elevation: 915 ft (279 m)
- Discharge
  - location: Jenkins
  - average: 285 cu/ft. per sec.

Basin features
- Tributaries
  - left: Gunter Creek, Jenkins Creek, Dry Creek
  - right: Rockhouse Creek

Flat Creek is a stream in Barry and Stone counties of southern Missouri. It is a tributary of the James River.

The stream source is north of Washburn and the confluence is with the James River arm of Table Rock Lake north of Cape Fair.

From its headwaters near Washburn, the stream flows northeast parallel to Missouri Route 37 passing through southeast Cassville. It continues to the northeast until meeting Little Flat Creek south of McDowell. The stream then flows to the southeast past Jenkins and under Missouri Route 248. The stream course begins to meander turning east and passing under Missouri Route 39 north of Cato. It meanders east passing into Stone County to enter the James River arm of Table Rock Lake after passing under Missouri Route 173 north of Cape Fair.

Flat Creek was so named on account of flat terrain near its course in the vicinity of Cassville.

== See also ==
- List of rivers of Missouri
