= U.S. Route 60 in Missouri =

Segment of American highway

U.S. Route 60
- US 60 highlighted in red

Route information
- Maintained by MoDOT
- Length: 341.248 mi (549.185 km)
- Existed: 1926–present

Major junctions
- West end: US 60 at the Oklahoma state line in Seneca
- I-49 / US 71 in Neosho; US 160 in Springfield; US 65 in Springfield; US 63 in Cabool; US 67 in Poplar Bluff; Future I-57 / US 67 / US 60 Bus. / US 67 Bus. in Poplar Bluff; I-55 in Sikeston; US 62 in Charleston
- East end: US 60 / US 62 at the Illinois state line near Wilson City

Location
- Country: United States
- State: Missouri
- Counties: Newton, Barry, Lawrence, Christian, Greene, Webster, Wright, Texas, Howell, Shannon, Carter, Butler, Stoddard, New Madrid, Scott, Mississippi

Highway system
- United States Numbered Highway System; List; Special; Divided; Missouri State Highway System; Interstate; US; State; Supplemental
← Route 59	→ US 61

U.S. Route 60 (US 60) is a part of the United States Numbered Highway System that runs from Brenda, Arizona, east to Virginia Beach, Virginia. In the state of Missouri, US 60 is a main east–west highway that runs through the southern part of the state, from the Oklahoma border to the Illinois border.

== Route description ==
US 60 enters Missouri from Oklahoma south of Seneca and south of I-44. It is a two-lane highway. It intersects Route 43 at a roundabout south of Seneca. Next, US 60 intersects I-49 and US 71 at exit 24 before entering Neosho. I-49 has a concurrency with US 71. In Neosho, US 60 picks up a concurrency with Route 59. Route 86 has a brief concurrency with US 60 and Route 59. US 60 will turn east and leave Route 59 while Route 59 continues north at an interchange before passing through Granby. In Monett, US 60 intersects Route 37. After leaving Monett, US 60 from there to Republic has alternate passing lanes. US 60 bypasses Aurora to the south. Then, it passes through Marionville and enters the Springfield metropolitan area and picks up a concurrency with Route 413 before entering Billings. In Republic, US 60 becomes a four-lane divided highway and remains a four lane highway for the next 240 miles (390 km) until it reaches Charleston. US 60 enters Springfield and the concurrency with Route 413 ends. US 60 merges onto the James River Freeway where it has a brief concurrency with US 160 and Route 13. US 60 intersects US 65 known as the "Schoolcraft Freeway" before leaving Springfield and is also where the James River Freeway ends.

Between Springfield and Willow Springs, US 60 passes through various communities as a four-lane expressway or freeway, most of them are mainly accessible by exits. US 60 also parallels the BNSF Railway tracks. US 60 intersects Route 125. It passes through Rogersville and Fordland before leaving Springfield metropolitan area. Afterwards, US 60 passes through Seymour. US 60 has a brief concurrency with Route 5 in Mansfield. US 60 passes through Mountain Grove. US 60 passes through Norwood and Cabool. Then, US 60 picks up a concurrency with US 63 east of Cabool. US 60 passes through Willow Springs where US 63 departs from US 60 at a freeway-to-freeway interchange east of Willow Springs. US 63 heads down southward to West Plains. At this point, US 60 no longer parallels the BNSF railway tracks as it heads down to West Plains as well.

US 60 passes through Mountain View where the divided highway briefly ends, While passing through Mountain View, US 60 has left turn lanes and has a concurrency with Route 17. After leaving Mountain View, US 60 goes back to a divided highway. US 60 passes through Birch Tree where it intersects Route 99. Then it passes through Winona where it has a concurrency with Route 19. US 60 passes through Chicopee, Van Buren and Ellsinore. Next, US 60 has a concurrency with US 67 until it enters Poplar Bluff as it leaves the Ozark Plateau.

In Poplar Bluff, US 60 separates from US 67 at a cloverleaf interchange. After leaving Poplar Bluff, US 60 intersects Route 51 north of Fisk. Next, US 60 passes through Dexter then intersects Route 114 east of Morehouse. US 60 bypasses Morehouse US 60 then enters Sikeston where it intersects US 61 before intersecting I-55 exit 66 and I-57 exit 1 at a cloverleaf interchange. I-57 begins here, and US 60 picks up a concurrency with I-57. In Charleston, US 60 will leave I-57 at exit 12 and has a concurrency with US 62 and Route 77. At this point, US 60 becomes a two-lane highway. US 60 and 62 passes through Wilson City where Route 77 departs from US 60 and US 62. US 60 will leave Missouri crossing after the Cairo Mississippi River Bridge along with US 62 into Illinois.

== History ==
Before the U.S. Highway system was created, US 60 was Route 16.

On May 17, 1946, William Jefferson Blythe, Jr., the biological father of Bill Clinton, died on US 60 in a car accident after he was tossed out of his vehicle and drowned in a ditch.

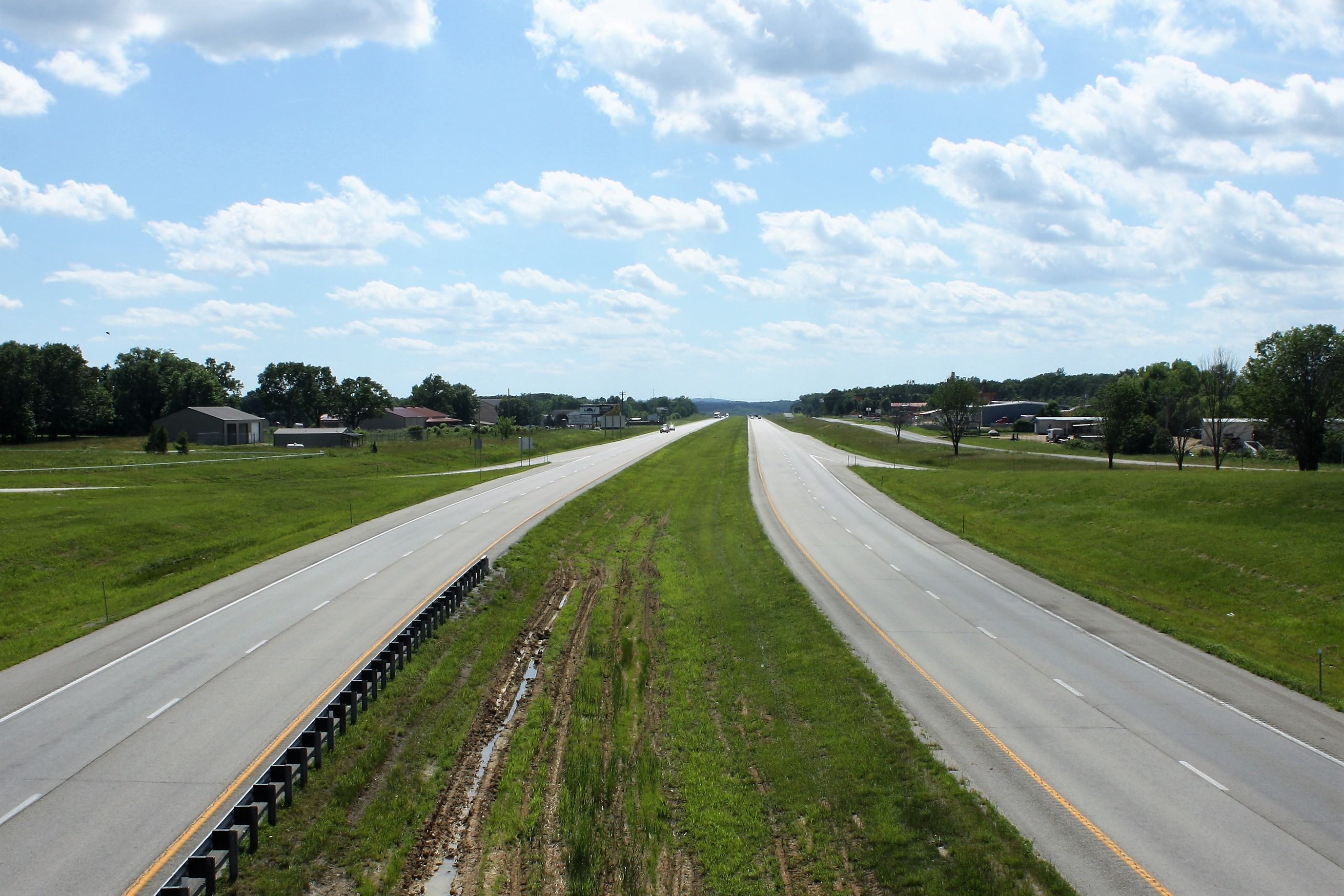
Part of the freeway section of US 60 near Mountain Grove

There have been several improvements on US 60. The Missouri Department of Transportation (MoDOT) completed the process of upgrading 59 miles (95 km) of US 60 from Willow Springs to Van Buren to a four-lane highway (two lanes in each direction) on July 9, 2010, marking the completion of a continuous four-lane highway from Republic to Charleston, a total of approximately 240 miles (390 km). Other improvement over the years involved replacing intersections with interchanges, adding frontage roads (outer roads), and many realignments of many parts of US 60.

West of US 60 and US 65 interchange in Springfield, there used to be railroad crossings over the BNSF Railway tracks that have been replaced with overpasses over the railroad tracks. That project included redesigning the US 60 and US 65 interchange. It was completed in 2012.

The portion of US 60 from Springfield to Sikeston was a consideration for the then proposed later cancelled Interstate 66 extension to follow.

In 2016, US 60 through Rogersville was converted into a freeway. Spot improvements between Springfield and Rogersville were completed.

== Future ==
US 60 from Poplar Bluff to Sikeston is planned to be upgraded to I-57. Interstate 57 currently ends at I-55 in Sikeston. I-57 will then continue south following US 67 down to Little Rock, Arkansas with I-57 already completed from Walnut Ridge, Arkansas to Little Rock.

== Major intersections ==
County	Location	mi	km	Exit	Destinations	Notes
Newton	Seneca	0.000	0.000		US 60 west – Wyandotte	Continuation into Oklahoma
Newton	Seneca	0.438	0.705		US 60 Bus. west / Route 43 – Seneca, Tiff City	Roundabout
Newton	Neosho	11.4	18.3		I-49 / US 71 – Joplin, Fort Smith	Exit 24 on I-49
Newton	Neosho	12.6	20.3		I-49 BL south / US 60 Bus. east / Route 59 (S. Neosho Boulevard)	West end of Route 59 overlap
Newton	Neosho–Granby township line	17.568	28.273		Route 86 west – Neosho	West end of Route 86 overlap
Newton	Neosho–Granby township line	17.818	28.675		Route 86 east – Cassville	East end of Route 86 overlap
Newton	Neosho–Granby township line	19.863	31.966		US 60 Bus. / Route 59 – Neosho, Diamond	East end of Route 59 overlap
Barry	Yonkerville	37.285	60.004		Route 97 – Pierce City, Pulaskifield	
Barry	Monett	41.712	67.129		Route 37 – Monett	
Barry	Monett	42.551	68.479		US 60 Bus. east / Route H (Kyler Street)	
Lawrence	Spring River Township	47.076	75.761		US 60 Bus. west – Monett	
Lawrence	Verona	49.395	79.494		US 60 Bus. east – Verona	
Lawrence	Aurora	54.138	87.127		Route 265 north / Route 39 to Route 248 – Aurora	West end of Route 265 overlap
Lawrence	Aurora	56.356	90.696		US 60 Bus. west – Aurora	
Lawrence	Marionville	60.176	96.844		Route 265 south – Crane	East end of Route 265 overlap
Lawrence	Marionville	60.456	97.295		Route 14 east	
Christian	West Polk–East Polk township line	65.192	104.916		Route 413 south – Crane	West end of Route 413 overlap
Christian	Billings	66.153	106.463		Route 14 west (Mt. Vernon Road) – McKinley	West end of Route 14 overlap
Christian	Billings	66.747	107.419		Route 14 east (Jefferson Avenue)	East end of Route 14 overlap
Greene	Republic	73.347	118.041		Route 174 west – Chesapeake	
Greene	Springfield	77.657	124.977	—	Route 413 north (W. Sunshine Street) / Route 360 west (James River Freeway) to I-44 – Springfield	East end of Route 413 overlap
Greene	Springfield	79.749	128.344	—	US 160 west / Route FF – Battlefield	West end of US 160 overlap; access to Springfield-Branson National Airport
Greene	Springfield	82.531	132.821	—	Route 13 north (Kansas Expressway)	Diverging diamond interchange; west end of Route 13 overlap
Greene	Springfield	83.696	134.696	—	US 160 east / Route 13 south / Campbell Avenue – Nixa	East end of US 160/Route 13 overlap; access to Downtown Springfield and Bass Pro Shops
Greene	Springfield	84.905	136.641	—	National Avenue	Access to Missouri State University, Ozarks Technical Community College, Drury University, Cox South Hospital, and Mercy Hospital
Greene	Springfield	86.248– 86.321	138.803– 138.920	—	US 65 Bus. (Glenstone Avenue) / Republic Road	West end of US 65 Bus. overlap; access to Evangel University and Springfield Nature Center
Greene	Springfield	87.809– 87.839	141.315– 141.363	—	US 65 / US 65 Bus. ends – Branson, Sedalia	East end of US 65 Bus. overlap
Greene	Clay Township	90.337	145.383	—	Route J / Route NN – Turners, Ozark	
Greene	Washington Township	94.146	151.513	—	Route 125 – Linden, Strafford	Roundabout interchange converted from at-grade traffic signal in August 2024
Greene	Rogersville	95.929	154.383	—	Farm Road 247	Eastbound exit and westbound entrance
Greene	Rogersville	95.985– 96.770	154.473– 155.736	—	US 60 Bus. east / Route B / Farm Road 253	
Webster	Rogersville	97.723	157.270	—	Route VV (Mill Street)	
Webster	Rogersville	99.634	160.345		US 60 Bus. west – Rogersville	
Webster	Fordland	105.682– 106.336	170.079– 171.131	—	Route PP – Fordland	No westbound entrance
Webster	Diggins	110.082	177.160	—	Route A / Route NN – Marshfield, Diggins	Future Interchange completed by 2027
Wright	Mansfield	126.050	202.858	—	US 60 Bus. east / Route 5 south / Route EE – Mansfield, Ava	West end of Route 5 overlap
Wright	Mansfield	127.307	204.881	—	US 60 Bus. west / Route 5 north – Mansfield, Hartville	East end of Route 5 overlap
Wright	Clark Township	132.709	213.574	—	Route K / Route Y – Macomb	
Wright	Norwood	136.223	219.230	—	Route C / Route E – Norwood	
Wright	Mountain Grove Township	142.908	229.988	—	US 60 Bus. east – Mountain Grove	
Wright	Mountain Grove	145.363	233.939	—	Route 95 – Mountain Grove	
Texas	Clinton Township	149.284	240.249	—	US 60 Bus. west / Route MM – Mountain Grove	
Texas	Clinton Township	152.278	245.068	—	US 60 Bus. east – Cabool	Eastbound exit and westbound entrance
Texas	Cabool	154.762	249.065	—	Route 181 – Cabool	
Texas	Cabool	155.984	251.032	—	US 63 north / US 60 Bus. – Houston, Rolla	West end of US 63 overlap
Howell	Willow Springs	164.815	265.244	—	US 60 Bus. east / US 63 Bus. south – Willow Springs	
Howell	Willow Springs	167.060	268.857	—	Route 76 west / Route 137 north – Willow Springs	
Howell	Willow Springs	169.140	272.204	—	US 60 Bus. west / US 63 Bus. north – Willow Springs	
Howell	Willow Springs Township	169.895	273.419	—	US 63 south – West Plains, Thayer	East end of US 63 overlap
Howell	Mountain View	183.363	295.094		Route 17 south – West Plains	West end of Route 17 overlap
Howell	Mountain View	184.902	297.571		Route 17 north	East end of Route 17 overlap
Shannon	Birch Tree	195.302	314.308		Route 99 south / Route FF – Birch Tree	
Shannon	Winona	203.789	327.967		Route 19 south – Alton	West end of Route 19 overlap
Shannon	Winona	204.594	329.262		Route 19 north – Eminence	East end of Route 19 overlap
Carter	Chicopee	224.722	361.655		Route 103 south – Big Spring	
Carter	Van Buren	225.222	362.460		US 60 Bus. east	
Carter	Carter Township	226.725	364.879		US 60 Bus. west to Route D / Route W	
Carter	Carter Township	231.261	372.179		Route 21 north / Route 34 – Ellington	West end of Route 21 overlap
Carter	Johnson Township	241.196	388.167		Route 21 south – Hunter, Grandin, Doniphan	East end of Route 21 overlap
Butler	Black River Township	260.535	419.290	—	US 67 north – St. Louis	West end of US 67 overlap
Butler	Poplar Bluff	265.007– 265.738	426.487– 427.664	—	Future I-57 south / US 67 south / US 60 Bus. east / US 67 Bus. south – Poplar Bluff, Corning AR	Cloverleaf interchange; east end of US 67 overlap
Butler	Poplar Bluff Township	270.884	435.946	—	US 60 Bus. – Poplar Bluff	Westbound exit and eastbound entrance
Butler	Poplar Bluff Township	271.506	436.947	—	Route T / Route AA – Lake Wappapello	
Stoddard	Duck Creek Township	279.397	449.646	—	Route 51 – Fisk, Puxico	
Stoddard	Duck Creek Township	285.153	458.909	—	Route TT / Route WW – Dudley	
Stoddard	Dexter	290.567	467.622	—	US 60 Bus. east / Route AD – Dexter	
Stoddard	Dexter	292.101	470.091	—	One Mile Road – Dexter	
Stoddard	Liberty Township	293.732	472.716	—	US 60 Bus. west / Route 25 – Dexter, Bloomfield	
Stoddard	Richland Township	301.238	484.796		Route 153 south / Route N – Circle City, Parma	
Stoddard	Richland Township	306.429	493.150		Route 114 – Morehouse	
New Madrid	Big Prairie Township	311.034	500.561		US 60 Bus. east / Route FF to Route 114	
New Madrid	Sikeston	313.917	505.200	—	US 61 east / US 62 / US 60 Bus. – Sikeston, New Madrid	
Scott	Sikeston	316.675	509.639	1	I-55 – St. Louis, Memphis I-57 begins	Signed as exits 1A (south) and 1B (north); current southern terminus of I-57; exits 66A-B on I-55
Mississippi	Long Prairie Township	321.591	517.551	4	Route B – Bertrand	
Mississippi	Charleston	327.420	526.931	10	I-57 BL north / Route 105 – Charleston, East Prairie	
Mississippi	Charleston	329.752	530.684	12	I-57 north / I-57 BL south / US 62 west / Route 77 north – Charleston, Wyatt	East end of I-57 overlap; west end of US 62/Route 77 overlap
Mississippi	Wilson City	334.873	538.926		Route 77 south / Route Y – Wyatt, Alfalfa Center	East end of Route 77 overlap
Mississippi River		341.248	549.185	Cairo Mississippi River Bridge; Missouri–Illinois state line		
Mississippi River		341.248	549.185		US 60 east / US 62 east – Cairo	Continuation into Illinois
1.000 mi = 1.609 km; 1.000 km = 0.621 mi: Concurrency terminus; Incomplete access; Unopened

== See also ==
U.S. Route 60
Previous state: Oklahoma	Missouri	Next state: Illinois
