= Bear Den Creek =

Location
- Country: United States
- State: Missouri
- Region: Ozarks

Physical characteristics
- Source
  - coordinates: 36°44′31″N 93°25′50″W
- Mouth
  - location: Table Rock Lake
  - coordinates: 36°43′10″N 93°29′36″W
  - elevation: 915 ft (279 m)

Bear Den Creek is a stream in Stone County in the Ozarks of southwest Missouri. It is alternately referred to as Bearden Hollow.

The stream source area is just south of Missouri Route 76 and west of Missouri Route Y. The stream flows southwest to west-southwest to enter the James River arm of Table Rock Lake east of Cape Fair. Peach Orchard Creek runs parallel to Bear Den just to the north.

Bear Den Creek was named after a cave along its course where bears made their dens.

== See also ==
- List of rivers of Missouri
