= Missouri Route 76 =

State highway in Missouri, U.S.

Route 76

Route information
- Maintained by MoDOT
- Length: 209.809 mi (337.655 km)
- Existed: 1926–present

Major junctions
- West end: E 240 Road at the Oklahoma state line near Tiff City
- I-49 / US 71 at Anderson; US 65 at Branson; US 160 at Forsyth
- East end: US 60 / US 63 / Route 137 at Willow Springs

Location
- Country: United States
- State: Missouri

Highway system
- Missouri State Highway System; Interstate; US; State; Supplemental
← Route 75	→ Route 77
← I-44 BL	Route 44	→ Route 45

Route 76 is a highway in the west half of southern Missouri running between U.S. Route 60 and U.S. Route 63 at Willow Springs and the Oklahoma state line near Tiff City where it continues as a county road. It bypasses Branson on the Ozark Mountain High Road and is the namesake of the Branson strip, 76 Country Blvd. The road runs for its entirety through the Missouri Ozarks, and is at times very hilly and curvy.

== Route description ==
Route 76 begins at Willow Springs. Within a couple of miles, the highways enters the Mark Twain National Forest, which it leaves after 17 miles (27 km). At the Douglas County line it begins a 5-mile (8.0 km) concurrency with Route 181. North of Vanzant is an intersection with Route 95, and 23 miles (37 km) further west is the northern junction with Route 5. On the west side of Ava, Route 76/Route 5 has an intersection with Route 14, and south of Ava, Route 76 will turn west off Route 5.

At Brownbranch, the highway enters another part of the Mark Twain National Forest, and at Bradleyville, it has a short concurrency with Route 125. At Kissee Mills, the road turns west with U.S. Route 160 and the two are united to Forsyth. At Forsyth, Route 76 leaves US 160 and crosses Bull Shoals Lake. At Branson, the road crosses Lake Taneycomo and meets U.S. Route 65.

Route 76 runs concurrent with US 65 for 4.7 miles (7.6 km) before exiting onto the Ozark Mountain Highroad Freeway. While on the freeway, Route 76 has an interchange with Route 248. At the west end of the highroad, Route 76 returns to its original route at an incomplete interchange, connecting with Route 376. On the west side of Branson, a concurrency with Route 265 begins; at Branson West, a concurrency with Route 13 begins. At Reeds Spring, Route 76 turns west towards Cape Fair. At Cape Fair is the southern terminus of Route 173.

At the Barry County line, Route 76 enters the Mark Twain National Forest for a third time. Eight miles (13 km) into the forest is a short, one-mile (1.6 km) concurrency with Route 39. At the west limits of the national forest, Route 76 unites with Route 86; they are concurrent for 16 miles (26 km). At Cassville is a short concurrency with Route 112 and an intersection with Route 37. The road becomes less winding and hilly in this area.

At Wheaton, Route 86 turns north. Route 76 continues west through McDonald County. At Anderson, Route 76 has an interchange with Interstate 49/U.S. Route 71, and just west is a two-mile (3 km) concurrency with Route 59. Seven miles west of Anderson, the highway joins Route 43, turning north with that highway three miles. At the northwest junction, Route 76 turns west for one mile (1.6 km) and enters Tiff City. The western limit of Tiff City is the Oklahoma state line, where Route 76 becomes a county road on the county line of Ottawa County and Delaware County, Oklahoma.

== History ==
Route 76 was initially designated in 1922, running from south of Spokane to Forsyth. The longer Route 78 passed through Forsyth on its path between Branson and the northeast corner of Taney County. In about 1929, Route 76 was extended west to Reeds Spring, and in the early 1930s Route 78 was extended northeast to Ava. With the extension of Route 80 west from Gainesville in the 1930s or 1940s, Route 78 west of Forsyth became part of Route 80, and the rest was absorbed into Route 76, which now connected Reeds Spring to Ava. US 160, designated in Missouri in the mid-1950s, initially followed Route 80 to Branson. It later moved to Route 76 west of Forsyth, and Route 76 was extended west via Branson, replacing part of Route 148 and much of Route 44. Route 44 had been designated in 1922 from Anderson to Abesville, and later extended west to Tiff City and east to Rockaway Beach. In the late 1950s, it was split up due to I-44, becoming Route 76 west of Cassville, Route 148 from Cassville to Galena, and a new Route 176 from Galena to Rockaway Beach.

In 1967-68, Route 76 was extended from Route 5 two miles north of Ava east along former State Route F through northeast Douglas County and other county roads to US 60/US 63 at Willow Springs in Howell County. This added approximately 53 miles plus a four-mile concurrence with Missouri Route 5 west of Ava.

Prior to January 2020, Route 76 ran along 76 Country Boulevard through Branson, where many of the entertainment theaters for which Branson is famous can be found. This alignment was plagued with traffic during much of the day and especially towards show start and end times (usually around 6-8 PM and 9-10PM). Now, Route 76 runs concurrent with US 65 for 4.7 miles (7.6 km) to the Ozark Mountain High Road, replacing Route 465. At the west end of the highroad, Route 76 returns to its original route, with its former routing through the interchange signed as Route 376.

== Major intersections ==
All exits are unnumbered.

County	Location	mi	km	Destinations	Notes
McDonald	Tiff City	0.000	0.000	E 240 Road	Continuation into Oklahoma
McDonald		0.665	1.070	Route 43 north – Seneca	West end of Route 43 overlap
McDonald		3.408	5.485	Route 43 south – Southwest City	East end of Route 43 overlap
McDonald	Anderson	10.559	16.993	Route 59 south – Lanagan	West end of Route 59 overlap
McDonald	Anderson	11.729	18.876	US 71 Bus. north / Route 59 north – Goodman, Neosho	East end of Route 59 overlap; west end of US 71 Bus. overlap
McDonald		12.707	20.450	US 71 Bus. south	East end of US 71 Bus. overlap
McDonald		13.439	21.628	I-49 / US 71 – Joplin, Fort Smith AR	I-49 exit 10
Barry		38.686	62.259	Route 86 west – Wheaton	West end of Route 86 overlap
Barry	Cassville	51.878	83.490	Route 37 / Route 112 north / Route 37 Bus. begins – Purdy, Washburn, Seligman	West end of Route 112 / Route 37 Bus. overlap
Barry	Cassville	53.046	85.369	Route 37 Bus. north (Main Street) – Monett	East end of Route 37 Bus. overlap
Barry	Cassville	53.245	85.690	Route 248 east	
Barry	Hilltop	54.802	88.195	Route 112 south – Seligman, Roaring River State Park	East end of Route 112 overlap
Barry	Bates Corner	57.466	92.483	Route 86 east – Eagle Rock	East end of Route 86 overlap
Barry		65.624	105.612	Route 39 north to Route 248 – Aurora	West end of Route 39 overlap
Barry	Hill City	66.794	107.495	Route 39 south – Shell Knob	East end of Route 39 overlap
Stone	Cape Fair	79.389	127.764	Route 173 north to Route 248	
Stone	Reeds Spring	88.204	141.951	Route 265 / Route 413 – Galena, Kimberling City	
Stone	Reeds Spring	88.681	142.718	Route 13 north – Reeds Spring Junction	West end of Route 13 overlap
Stone	Branson West	90.478	145.610	Route 265 / Route 413 north / Business 13 south – Reeds Spring	West end of Route 265 overlap; southern terminus of Route 413
Stone	Branson West	91.335	146.989	Route 13 south – Kimberling City	East end of Route 13 overlap
Stone	Branson West	91.741	147.643	Business 13	
Stone		95.422	153.567	Route 265 south to Route 165 – Branson, Shepherd of the Hills Fish Hatchery, Table Rock Dam and Visitor Center, Table Rock State Park	East end of Route 265 overlap
Stone		96.059	154.592	Route 376 east (Seventy-six Country Boulevard)	West end of freeway; south end of Ozark Mountain Highroad (former Route 465); northern terminus of Route 376; former Route 76 east
Stone		96.059	154.592	Ozark Mountain Highroad south	Unbuilt interchange
Taney		100.733	162.114	Route 248	
Taney				West Outer Road (Adair Road)	At-grade intersection; east end of freeway
Taney		103.722	166.924	US 65 north / Route F – Springfield	North end of Ozark Mountain Highroad; west end of freeway; west end of US 65 overlap; western terminus of Route F
Taney	Branson	106.362	171.173	Branson Hills Parkway / Bee Creek Road	
Taney	Branson	107.196	172.515	Route 248 / Red Route west / CR 165 south (Shepherd of the Hills Expressway) Red Route east (Branson Landing Boulevard)	Diverging diamond interchange
Taney	Branson	108.162	174.070	US 65 south – Springfield US 65 Bus. (Main Street) begins / Seventy-six Country Boulevard	East end of freeway; east end of US 65 overlap; west end of US 65 Bus. overlap; Seventy-six Country Blvd. is former Route 76 west
Taney	Branson	109.062	175.518	Red Route west (Veterans Boulevard north)	Eastern terminus of the Red Route
Taney	Hollister	109.817	176.733	US 65 Bus. south / Branson Landing Boulevard – Hollister	Roundabout; east end of US 65 Bus. overlap
Taney	Forsyth	121.887	196.158	US 160 west – Forsyth	West end of US 160 overlap
Taney		124.792	200.833	US 160 east – Kissee Mills, Gainesville	East end of US 160 overlap
Taney	Bradleyville	137.560	221.381	Route 125 north – Garrison	West end of Route 125 overlap
Taney		138.226	222.453	Route 125 south – Rueter	East end of Route 125 overlap
Douglas	Ava	161.697	260.226	Route 5 Bus. north (Jefferson Street) / Route 5 south – Gainesville	West end of Route 5 overlap
Douglas	Ava	163.510	263.144	Route 5 Bus. south / Route 14 (Springfield Avenue) – Sparta	
Douglas		165.823	266.866	Route 5 north / Route B north – Mansfield, Mount Zion	East end of Route 5 overlap
Douglas		189.147	304.403	Route 95 to Route 14 – Mountain Grove	
Douglas		198.934	320.153	Route 181 north – Cabool	West end of Route 181 overlap
Douglas		202.456	325.821	Route 181 south	East end of Route 181 overlap
Howell	Willow Springs	209.618– 209.809	337.347– 337.655	Route 137 north (Harris Street) / US 60 / US 63 – Cabool, West Plains	Interchange; eastern terminus; highway continues north as Route 137 (Harris St.)
1.000 mi = 1.609 km; 1.000 km = 0.621 mi: Concurrency terminus; Unopened
