= Peach Orchard Creek =

Location
- Country: United States
- State: Missouri
- Region: Stone County

Physical characteristics
- Source
  - coordinates: 36°44′37″N 93°25′47″W
- Mouth
  - coordinates: 36°44′32″N 93°29′53″W
  - elevation: 915 ft (279 m)

Peach Orchard Creek is a stream in Stone County in the Ozarks of southwest Missouri, USA.

The stream headwaters are located just west of the intersection of Missouri Route 76 with Missouri Route HH and the stream flows west to its confluence with the James River arm of Table Rock Lake just north of Cape Fair. Bear Den Creek lies south of Route 76 and flows essentially parallel to Peach Orchard Creek.

Peach Orchard Creek was so named on account of a peach orchard near its course.

== See also ==
- List of rivers of Missouri
