= Missouri Route 413 =

State highway in Missouri, U.S.

Route 413
- MO 413 highlighted in red

Route information
- Maintained by MoDOT
- Length: 48.745 mi (78.447 km)
- Existed: 2000–present

Major junctions
- South end: Route 13 / Route 76 / Route 265 in Branson West
- US 60 from Billings to Republic; US 160 in Springfield
- North end: Route 13 in Springfield

Location
- Country: United States
- State: Missouri

Highway system
- Missouri State Highway System; Interstate; US; State; Supplemental
← US 412	→ I-435

Route 413 is a highway in Missouri running between Route 13 in Springfield and Route 13 in Reeds Spring. It is an older alignment of Route 13 which was later rerouted. Except for two sections (in Springfield between Route 13 and US 60 and a 4-mile segment between US 60 and Route 265 southwest of Billings), the road runs concurrent with other designations for its entire length.

== Route description ==
Route 413 begins at an intersection with Route 13, Route 76 and Route 265 in Branson West. Route 265 joins up with 413 at the southern terminus and the two routes are concurrent. The roads head north and intersect with local roads. Routes 76 and 13 parallel Routes 413 and 265 as the roads continue out of Branson West. The routes proceed through a mountainous region and enter Reeds Spring, where they intersect with a now-separated Route 76. Routes 413 and 265 pass to the west of Emerson Airport and continue northward, still paralleling Route 13.

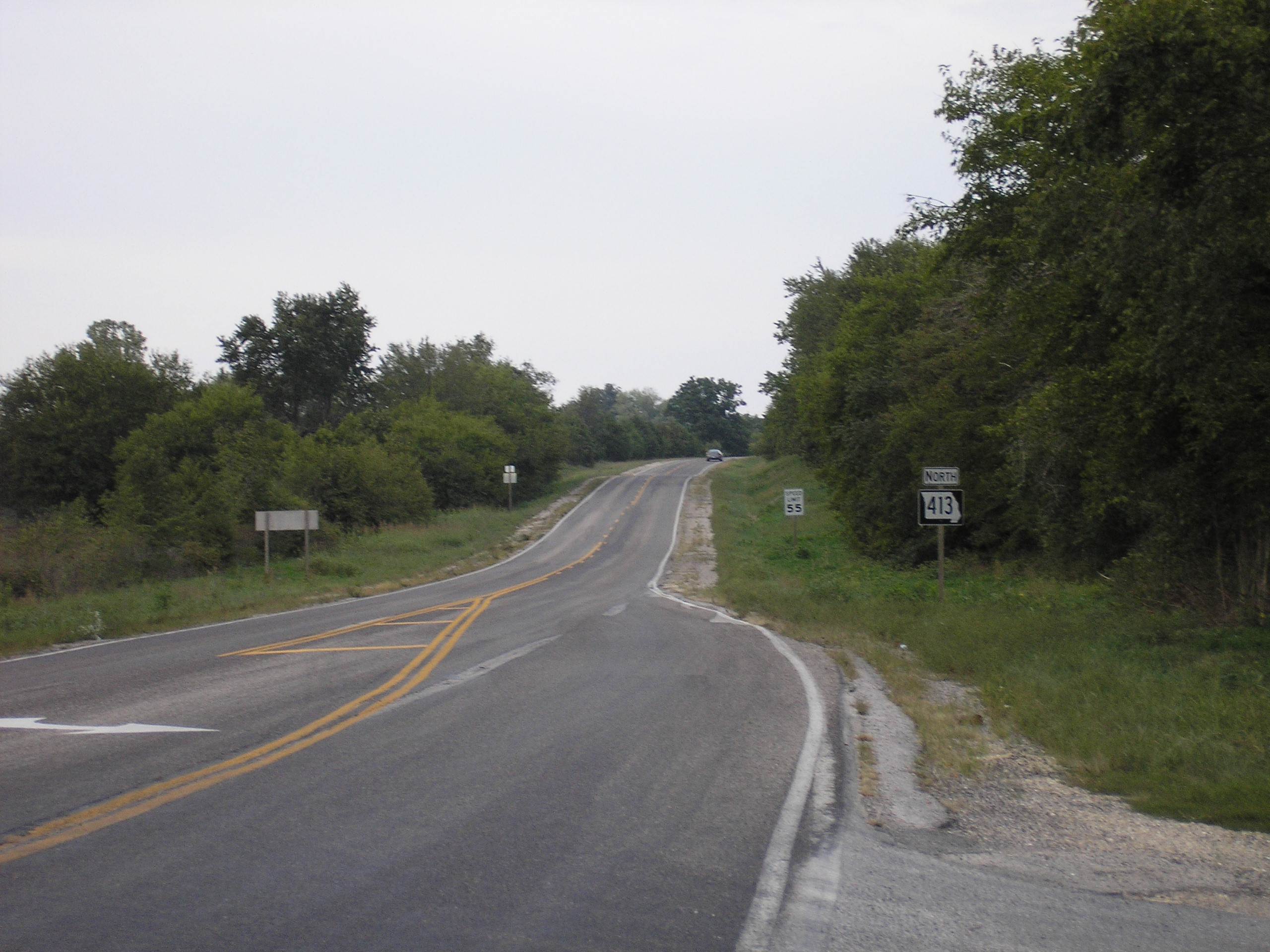
Route 413 southwest of Billings, one of only two sections not concurrent with another highway.

Routes 413 and 265 turn sharply to the west and intersect with Route 248. Route 248 joins the concurrency and the three roads make several changes in direction before steadily heading north. Routes 413, 265, and 248 begin to turn in different directions again and cross through more rural territory. The three roads go through a dense forest just south of Galena. At the intersection with Route 176, the three routes turn to the west, where Route 248 turns off. Routes 413 and 265 continue farther west. Northwest of Galena, the roads intersect with their first supplemental route, Route AA. Routes 413 and 265 head through farmlands, where Route 173 terminates.

The roads intersect with another county road in Elsey as they continue northward. Routes 265 and 413 pass a dense forest to the north and heads into Crane. The routes leave Crane after intersecting with a few county and local roads. Near Logan, Route 265 turns off to the west and Route 413 continues northward. Route 413 intersects and becomes concurrent with U.S. Route 60. Routes 413 and 60 then enter the Billings city limits. Route 14 intersects soon afterward. 413 and 60 head northeast into Republic intersecting the eastern terminus with Route 174. 413, and 60 then continue northeast towards James River Freeway where U.S. 60 splits off to the east, merging onto James River Freeway, and Route 413 heads northeast into Springfield, where Route 413 comes to an end at Route 13.

== History ==
The highway was originally commissioned in 2000 to replace a section of Route 13 that was rerouted along the James River Freeway and only ran from Kansas Expressway in Springfield to the James River Freeway.

== Junction list ==
County	Location	mi	km	Destinations	Notes
Stone	Branson West	0.000	0.000	Route 13 / Route 76 / Route 265 south	South end of Route 265 overlap
Stone	Reeds Spring	1.950	3.138	Route 76	
Stone	Reeds Spring	3.557	5.724	Route 248 east	South end of Route 248 overlap
Stone	Galena	11.131	17.914	Route 176	
Stone	Galena	11.515	18.532	Route 248 west	North end of Route 248 overlap
Stone	Elsey	16.551	26.636	Route 173	
Stone–Christian county line		27.523	44.294	Route 265 north	North end of Route 265 overlap
Christian		31.439	50.596	US 60 west	South end of US 60 overlap
Christian	Billings	32.400	52.143	Route 14	
Greene	Republic	39.594	63.720	Route 174	
Greene	Republic	43.749	70.407	US 60 east / Route 360 west	North end of US 60 overlap
Greene	Springfield	46.923	75.515	US 160	
Greene	Springfield	48.745	78.447	Route 13 (Kansas Expressway)	
1.000 mi = 1.609 km; 1.000 km = 0.621 mi: Concurrency terminus

== See also ==
- List of state highways in Missouri
