= Missouri Route 112 =

State highway in Missouri, U.S.

Route 112
- MO 112 highlighted in red

Route information
- Maintained by MoDOT
- Length: 17.505 mi (28.172 km)

Major junctions
- South end: Route 37 / Route DD in Seligman
- Route 112 Spur in Roaring River State Park; Route 248 in Cassville
- North end: Route 37 / Route 76 / Route 86 in Cassville

Location
- Country: United States
- State: Missouri
- County: Barry

Highway system
- Missouri State Highway System; Interstate; US; State; Supplemental
| ← Route 111 | → Route 113 |

Route 112 is a highway in southwestern Missouri. Both termini are with Route 37. The northern terminus is in Cassville and the southern terminus is in Seligman. There are no other towns on the route, but Roaring River State Park is located about ten miles (16 km) south of Cassville on the route.

The numbering of this highway is unusual. In Missouri, even-numbered highways are normally east–west routes and Route 112 is a north–south highway. The only other time this occurs is highways which are numbered from highways from other states which continue into Missouri and the numbering is retained.

== Major intersections ==
The entire route is in Barry County.

| Location | mi | km | Destinations | Notes |
|---|---|---|---|---|
| Seligman | 0.000 | 0.000 | Route 37 / Route DD | |
| Roaring River State Park | 9.325 | 15.007 | Route 112 Spur | |
| Washburn Township | 14.589 | 23.479 | Route 76 east / Route 86 east | South end of Route 76 and Route 86 overlaps |
| Cassville | 16.147 | 25.986 | Route 248 east | |
| Cassville | 16.346 | 26.306 | Route 37 Bus. north | South end of Route 37 Bus. overlap |
| Cassville | 17.505 | 28.172 | Route 37 / Route 37 Bus. ends Route 76 west / Route 86 west | North end of Route 76, Route 86, and Route 37 Bus. overlaps |
1.000 mi = 1.609 km; 1.000 km = 0.621 mi: Concurrency terminus

== Related route ==
Route 112 Spur
- Location: Roaring River State Park
- Length: 0.361 mi (581 m)

Route 112 Spur serves as the main road into Roaring River State Park. Although unsigned, it appears on the official state highway map.
