= Missouri Route 165 =

State highway in Missouri, U.S.

Route 165
- Route 165 highlighted in red; CR 165 highlighted in blue

Route information
- Maintained by MoDOT
- Length: 8.413 mi (13.539 km)

Major junctions
- South end: Route 265 near Hollister
- North end: Blue Route in Branson

Location
- Country: United States
- State: Missouri

Highway system
- Missouri State Highway System; Interstate; US; State; Supplemental
← Route 164	→ US 166

Route 165 and County Road 165 (CR 165) form a loop around the west side of Branson, Missouri, in Taney and Stone counties. The highway's southern terminus is at U.S. Route 65 (US 65) south of Branson, in Hollister. Even though the county road designation belongs to Taney County, it briefly enters Stone County at Table Rock State Park. Upon re-entering Taney County, it crosses the Table Rock Lake Dam, along with Route 265, at Table Rock Lake. Its northern terminus is at US 65 along the Red Route in north Branson.

== Route description ==
County Road 165
- Location: Hollister–Branson
- Length: 18.174 mi (29.248 km)

CR 165 begins at, and running concurrently with, US 65 Business (US 65 Bus.) at an interchange with US 65, where the road meets Industrial Park Drive in Hollister. The road begins its loop around Branson's west side in a clockwise direction. Near the entrance to College of the Ozarks at Opportunity Lane, US 65 Bus. turns right, while CR 165 heads left. The road eventually leaves Hollister and crosses Short Creek in rural Taney County. It then joins Route 265 in a concurrency, at which point Route 165 begins. In Table Rock State Park, the three highways briefly enter Stone County, where the road encounters the junction with the Showboat Branson Belle. After re-entering Taney County, the road crosses the Table Rock Dam on the White River, and enters the Table Rock neighborhood of Branson. There, Route 265 splits from the concurrency, turning left while Route 165/CR 165 heads right. When Route 165/CR 65 arrives at the intersection with Seventy-six Country Boulevard in Branson, Route 165 ends and CR 165 continues north along the Blue Route (Gretna Road). The Blue Route leaves this concurrency by turning right on Roark Valley Road, while Gretna Road continues north with CR 165. When the road meets Route 248/Red Route on Shepherd of the Hills Expressway, CR 165 heads east along with Route 248 and the Red Route until they meet the interchange with US 65. There, CR 165 and Route 248 terminate, as the Red Route continues into Downtown Branson.

== History ==
The portion of CR 165 that runs between the southern terminus of Route 165 and Freeman Lane (former US 65/US 160) was once part of Route 165. This stretch of CR 165, along with the portion between Freeman Lan and Opportunity Drive, is designated Historic Highway 165 on street signs. The stretch of CR 165 between Opportunity Drive and US 65 in Hollister was once signed as Route V.

== Junction list ==
County	Location	mi	km	Destinations	Notes
Taney	Hollister	0.000	0.000	US 65 – Springfield, Harrison US 65 Bus. begins	Southern end of US 65 Bus. concurrency; southern terminus of CR 165; roadway continues east as Industrial Park Drive
Taney	Hollister	0.309	0.497	US 65 Bus. north – M. Graham Clark Downtown Airport	Northern end of US 65 Bus. concurrency
Taney		4.580 0.000 (Note: Route 165 length)	7.371 0.000	Route 265 south to US 65 Route 165 begins	Southern end of Route 265 concurrency; southern terminus of Route 165
Stone	No major junctions				
Taney	Branson	8.627 4.047	13.884 6.513	Route 265 north – Silver Dollar City	Northern end of Route 265 concurrency
Taney	Branson	12.593 8.013	20.266 12.896	Green Mountain Drive (Yellow Route)	
Taney	Branson	12.993 8.413	20.910 13.539	Route 165 ends Seventy-six Country Boulevard – Branson, Silver Dollar City Blue Route begins	Southern end of Blue Route concurrency; Seventy-six Country Boulevard is former Route 76; northern terminus of Route 165
Taney	Branson	14.575	23.456	Roark Valley Road (Blue Route east)	Northern end of Blue Route overlap
Taney	Branson	16.226	26.113	Route 248 / Red Route west (Shepherd of the Hills Expressway west)	Southern end of Route 248/Red Route concurrency
Taney	Branson	18.054– 18.174	29.055– 29.248	Route 248 ends US 65 (Route 76) – Harrison, Springfield Red Route east (Branson Landing Boulevard)	Diverging diamond interchange with US 65; northern end of Route 248/Red Route concurrency; northern terminus of CR 165; eastern terminus of Route 248; road continues as Red Route east (Branson Landing Boulevard)
1.000 mi = 1.609 km; 1.000 km = 0.621 mi: Concurrency terminus
