= Missouri Route 248 =

State highway in Missouri, U.S.

Route 248
- MO 248 highlighted in red

Route information
- Maintained by MoDOT
- Length: 55.833 mi (89.855 km)

Major junctions
- West end: Route 76 / Route 86 / Route 112 in Cassville
- Route 39 near Jenkins; Route 173 in Crossroads; Route 165 / Route 265 / Route 413 in Galena; US 160 / Route 13 / Route 265 / Route 413 in Reeds Spring; Route 76 in Garber
- East end: US 65 / US 65 Bus. / Route 76 in Branson

Location
- Country: United States
- State: Missouri
- Counties: Barry, Stone, Taney

Highway system
- Missouri State Highway System; Interstate; US; State; Supplemental
← Route 246	→ Route 249

Route 248 is a highway in southwestern Missouri. Its western terminus is at Route 76/Route 86/Route 112 in Cassville. Its eastern terminus is at U.S. Route 65 (US 65) in Branson.

== Route description ==
Route 248 begins at a diverging diamond interchange with U.S. Route 65 at the northern terminus of Business US 65. The highway proceeds west through northern Branson as the Shepherd of the Hills Expressway, which despite its name is a four-lane boulevard with no controlled-access interchanges. It eventually turns north as a two-lane highway and leaves Branson (Shepherd of the Hills Expressway continues westward as a separate highway from an intersection near Kirby Van Burch's theater). North of Branson, it intersects Route 76 (the Ozark Mountain Highroad). Seven miles north of Branson, it begins a five-mile (8 km) concurrency with U.S. Route 160. At Reeds Spring Junction, the road leaves US 160 and begins a short concurrency (about one mile) with Route 13.

Route 248 continues west to Reeds Spring, where it joins Routes 265 and 413. The three roads will be united to Galena. This section of highway is a windy, hilly, two-lane highway making switchbacks through the Ozark Mountains. The entire section of highway is marked with no-passing stripes. At Galena is the Y-Bridge, placed on the National Register of Historic Places (closed to vehicles). Just north of the bridge is the western terminus of Route 176. Route 248/265/413 turns west, crossing James River. Route 248 then leaves the concurrency, heading into downtown Galena. The highway then leaves Galena on a northwesterly direction.

At Crossroads (five miles west of Galena) is an intersection with Route 173. Twelve miles west of Crossroads, Route 248 intersects Route 39 one mile (1.6 km) south of Jenkins. The highway becomes fairly straight, though still hilly as it heads into Cassville. Route 248 ends in downtown Cassville at the concurrency of Routes 76, 86, and 112.

== History ==
Route 248 was initially Route 148, numbered in the mid-1950s to replace Route 80 between Elsey and Branson when the rest became US 160. A late 1950s extension of Route 76 replaced all of Route 148 except the portion north of Cape Fair, which became Route 173; Route 148 was then reassigned to the nearby former Route 44 from Cassville to Galena and part of Route 76 east from Reeds Spring. It has since been extended back east to Branson along former US 65.

== Major intersections ==
County	Location	mi	km	Destinations	Notes
Barry	Cassville	0.000	0.000	Route 76 / Route 86 / Route 112	
Barry	Jenkins Township	14.138	22.753	Route 39 – Aurora, Shell Knob	
Stone	Lincoln Township	27.261	43.872	Route 173 – Elsey, Cape Fair	
Stone	Galena	31.768	51.126	Route 265 north / Route 413 north – Crane	Western end of Route 265 / Route 413 overlap
Stone	Galena	32.152	51.744	Route 176 east to US 160	
Stone	Reeds Spring	39.721	63.925	Route 265 south / Route 413 south	Eastern end of Route 265 / Route 413 overlap
Stone	Reeds Spring	41.164	66.247	Route 13 south – Branson West	Western end of Route 13 overlap
Stone	Reeds Spring	41.960	67.528	US 160 west / Route 13 north – Spokane, Springfield	Eastern end of Route 13 overlap; western end of US 160 overlap
Taney	Branson Township	46.867	75.425	US 160 east – Forsyth	Eastern end of US 160 overlap
Taney	Branson Township	49.632	79.875	Route 76 to US 65	Formerly Route 465
Taney	Branson	53.626	86.303	Shepherd of the Hills Expressway (Red Route west)	Western end of Red Route overlap
Taney	Branson	53.885	86.720	CR 165 south (Gretna Road)	Western end of CR 165 overlap; formerly Route 165
Taney	Branson	55.713– 55.833	89.661– 89.855	US 65 / Route 76 – Harrison, Springfield US 65 Bus. south / Branson Landing Boulevard (Red Route east) / CR 165 ends	Diverging diamond interchange; eastern end of Red Route and CR 165 overlaps; roadway continues as US 65 Business
1.000 mi = 1.609 km; 1.000 km = 0.621 mi: Concurrency terminus
