= James River Freeway =

Highway in Missouri

- James River Freeway highlighted in red

Route information
- Maintained by MoDOT
- Length: 14 mi (23 km) Route 360: 4 mi (6.4 km)
- Component highways: US 60; US 160; Route 360

Major junctions
- West end: I-44 near Republic
- East end: US 65 at Springfield

Location
- Country: United States
- State: Missouri

Highway system
- United States Numbered Highway System; List; Special; Divided; Missouri State Highway System; Interstate; US; State; Supplemental
← Route 350	Route 360	→ Route 364

James River Freeway is a 14-mile-long (23 km) freeway located largely on the south side of Springfield, Missouri. Its western terminus is at Interstate 44 (I-44) north of Brookline and its eastern terminus is at U.S. Route 65 (US 65) in southeastern Springfield. It is named for the James River, which passes near the highway at the freeway's eastern terminus. A total of four highways (and one business route) are routed on the highway: Route 360, US 60, US 160, Route 13, and Business US 65.

== Route description ==
The four-mile (6.4 km) portion of the James River Freeway between I-44 and the interchange with US 60 and Route 413 is designated as Route 360. Other than its endpoints, there is only one interchange on the route: Route MM in Brookline (now part of Republic). Exit markers for the highway mark the road as the James River Freeway and have no control cities, only "To Route 60" eastbound and "To I-44" westbound.

The control cities between US 60 and US 65 are Republic westbound and Rogersville eastbound. At US 65, they are Springfield westbound and Cabool eastbound.

== History ==
As Springfield began to expand to the south, traffic began to grow rapidly on Route M (known locally as Republic Road) causing significant traffic problems. A proposal for a new highway on the south side (I-44 is on the north, and US 65, also a freeway, is on the east) had been around for some time. By the early 1990s, the road was under construction. It opened in four sections:

=== Section 1 ===
The first section connected US 160 (Campbell Avenue) with US 65. It took over a slightly reworked Glenstone Avenue which had been around previously and built not-quite to freeway standards. When the original highway had turned, an interchange was built and Glenstone Avenue turned west to become Republic Road. The new south outer road (east of the interchange) now became Glenstone Avenue. Republic Road also crosses over the same interchange and continues east. At this point, Route M was routed down the freeway and Republic Road became a city street.

=== Section 2 ===
The second section was a relatively short section connecting Kansas Expressway and Campbell Avenue. Shortly after the road was opened, US 60 was rerouted so that it turned south on Kansas Expressway (previously, a city street), then joined the James River Freeway, continuing on east past Glenstone where the road originally joined the freeway.

=== Section 3 ===
The third section connected US 60 with Kansas Expressway. At the same time it was opened, West Bypass (which previously ended at Sunshine Street to the north, then US 60) was extended south and provided access to west Battlefield Road. US 60 was re-routed down the new stretch of freeway at this time and US 160 was rerouted down West Bypass, joining the freeway for a few miles before turning off again at Campbell Ave.

=== Section 4 ===
The final section connected Interstate 44 with US 60. Route MM had long served as a bypass on the west side of the city, running through the former town of Brookline but as a two-lane road inadequate for its traffic. The final section served to connect these two roads, also provide traffic relief for US 65 on the east side of the city by providing a direct path from Interstate 44 on the west side of Springfield with US 60, a major east–west road on the south side of the state east of the city (much traffic had had to travel to US 65 and head south to US 60). This section, completed in 2002, was designated as Route 360.

== Future ==
=== North Corridor Loop ===
A study to extend the James River Freeway is on the Missouri Department of Transportation (MoDOT) July 2024 Tier 1 - High Priority Unfunded Road and Bridge Needs list and the Southwest Missouri Council of Governments (SMCOG) 2024 Greene County Transportation Needs List. The Ozark Transportation Organization (OTO) submitted the requests for a study through their Technical Committee with final approval by the OTO Board of Directors in a May 2024 meeting. The estimated funding needed for a study is 1.5 million dollars.

Project description by MoDOT: Corridor location and environmental study for new north corridor in the Springfield Metropolitan area to increase economic growth and improve safety.

Project description by SMCOG: An extension of James River Freeway to loop north of Willard then curve to the East and intersect Highway 13 near the north side of the Green County line and extend to Highway 65 near Fair Grove to create economic development and provide access from the north to the already growing job market in the region. Create space for a 1,000-acre site that would have both interstate access and rail.

=== West of Interstate 44 ===
The freeway will not be extended west of I-44 to connect it to the airport. Instead MoDOT and the city of Springfield shared in the upgrade of the I-44 and Chestnut Expressway interchange. A new road was built that connects the new terminal with Route 266 (Chestnut).

=== Glenstone Avenue interchange ===
Due to continued development on the city's south side, MODOT and the City of Springfield shared in the reconstruction of the Glenstone Ave. and James River Freeway interchange. Part of the interchange was moved to the south and west of the original interchange. Traffic wanting to enter James River Freeway going east now travels over the bridge and around a loop. Traffic coming from Republic Road wanting to enter JRF going east simply takes the existing on-ramp. Traffic wanting to exit from eastbound JRF to get to North Glenstone or W. Republic Road will take the new exit to get to the new part of the interchange. Traffic from westbound JRF exiting to N. Glenstone or W. Republic Rd. will use the existing exit ramp and traffic entering westbound JRF from Glenstone or Republic will use the existing on-ramp. The stoplight for this part of the interchange will remain. The project was completed in December 2008. By October of 2021, There will be a roundabout on the south side of the interchange. Roads entering/exiting the roundabout include Republic Rd/Glenstone Ave, Nature Center Way (JRF outer road), and the ramp to US 60 East. There are currently two ramps to eastbound US 60, one supporting traffic from E. Republic Road and the other from S. Glenstone Ave. The ramp supporting E. Republic Road will be demolished, and the other ramp will be restructured and widened to support left-turning traffic from E. Republic Road and connect to the new roundabout. US 60 will be receiving a new through travel lane in each direction with this project. The entire project was completed in summer 2022.

=== US 60 & US 65 ===
The current cloverleaf interchange has been the source of many accidents due to the growth of the cities of Ozark, Nixa, and Branson to the south. Also, the railroad crossing, which crosses not only the freeway itself, but the ramp from east 60 to south 65, has also resulted in numerous accidents from vehicles stopping because of a train passing or because they are required to (buses or trucks carrying hazardous materials). The current highway, James River Freeway, curves and then travels down a steep grade to the interchange with US 65 then crosses James River before going up a steep grade and curve before heading east towards Rogersville, MO. Completed in October 2012, a large project replaced the two eastern loops with flyover ramps. The northbound US 65 bridge over US 60, as well as the westbound US 60 bridge over James River were replaced. The railroad grade crossing was removed by building four bridges over Galloway Creek and the BNSF track.

=== East of US 65 ===
MoDOT discussed the possibility of upgrading US 60 east of the US 65 freeway, to as far east as Rogersville, at a public meeting on November 29, 2007. So far interchanges have been constructed in Rogersville as well as at the J/NN intersection. An interchange at Route 125 will be completed by 2023.

=== National Avenue area ===
A construction project was completed in July 2010 to improve traffic flow near the Cox Health buildings in southern Springfield by converting the interchange into a six-lane diverging diamond interchange (DDI). It was the second DDI to appear in Springfield (the first being the Interstate 44/Kansas Expressway interchange).

Just north of this interchange, a safer underpass was created for E. Bradford Parkway to remove the at-grade intersection with National Avenue. Both of these projects were funded through a partnership between MODOT, the City of Springfield, and Cox Health Systems.

== Exit list ==
The entire route is in Greene County.

Location	mi	km	Destinations	Notes
	0.00	0.00	I-44 – Joplin, Springfield	Western terminus of Route 360
Republic	1.78	2.86	Route MM – Republic	
Republic	3.54	5.70	US 60 west / Route 413 (W. Sunshine Street) – Springfield, Republic	Eastern terminus of Route 360, US-60 joins freeway. Access to Wilson's Creek National Battlefield
	5.73	9.22	US 160 west / Route FF – Battlefield	Western end of US-160 concurrency. Access to Springfield-Branson National Airport.
Springfield	8.34	13.42	Route 13 north (Kansas Expressway)	Western end of Route 13 concurrency; diverging diamond interchange, converted from existing interchange August 18, 2013
Springfield	9.80	15.77	US 160 east / Route 13 south (Campbell Avenue) – Nixa	Eastern end of US-160 / Route 13 concurrency. Access to Downtown Springfield and Bass Pro Shops
Springfield	10.88	17.51	National Avenue	Diverging diamond interchange. Access to Missouri State University, Ozarks Technical Community College, Drury University, Cox South Hospital, and Mercy Hospital
Springfield	12.28	19.76	US 65 Bus. (Glenstone Avenue) / Republic Road	Western end of US 65 Business overlap. Access to Evangel University and Springfield Nature Center
Springfield	13.78	22.18	US 65 – Sedalia, Branson	Eastern end of US 65 Business overlap
Springfield	13.78	22.18	US 60 continues east toward Cabool	
1.000 mi = 1.609 km; 1.000 km = 0.621 mi: Concurrency terminus
