= Stoneridge =

Stoneridge could refer to:

== Places ==
- Stoneridge, Ontario, Canada, a community
- Stoneridge, Missouri, United States, an unincorporated community
- Stoneridge, New Mexico, United States, a census-designated place
- Stoneridge Shopping Center, a shopping mall in Pleasanton, California, United States

== Other uses ==
- Stoneridge Group, American political campaign marketing group
- Stoneridge Investment Partners v. Scientific-Atlanta, Inc., 2008 United States Supreme Court case
