= Missouri Route 376 =

State highway in Missouri, U.S.

Route 376

Route information
- Maintained by MoDOT
- Length: 4.28 mi (6.89 km)
- Existed: 1996–present

Major junctions
- South end: Route 265 near Branson
- North end: Route 76 near Branson

Location
- Country: United States
- State: Missouri
- Counties: Taney, Stone

Highway system
- Missouri State Highway System; Interstate; US; State; Supplemental
← Route 371	→ US 400

Route 376 is a short highway in Branson, Missouri. Its southern terminus is at Route 265, and its northern terminus is at Route 76.

== Route description ==
In the south, Route 376 begins at Route 265 and heads northeast as a four-lane highway. It proceeds uneventfully through generally rural land until curving towards the northwest. Entering a more developed area of Branson, the highway turns east and passes the Celebration City theme park. After a series of slight north–south curves, it turns left on to 76 Country Blvd. The Route then curves Northwest-Southeast past the Ruth & Paul Henning Conservation Area and the Shepherd of the Hills properties as a two-lane highway. The route ends at a junction with Route 76, at the south end of the Ozark Mountain Highroad. Past the junction at the Highroad, the road continues west as Route 76.

== History ==
Route 376 was designated by 1996. Prior to January 2020, the highway ended at 76 Country Boulevard, when the road was designated as Route 76. When 76 Country Boulevard east of current Route 376 was turned over to the City of Branson, Route 76 through Branson was rerouted on to the Ozark Mountain Highroad, bypassing the city.

== Junction list ==
County	Location	mi	km	Destinations	Notes
Taney		0.000	0.000	Route 265	Southern terminus
Taney	Branson	1.605	2.583	Yellow Route east (Green Mountain Drive)	Southern end of Yellow Route concurrency
Taney	Branson	1.739	2.799	Yellow Route ends / Red Route east (Shepherd of the Hills Expressway)	Northern end of Yellow Route concurrency; western terminus of Yellow Route; eastern terminus of Red Route
Stone		4.28	6.89	Route 76	Northern terminus; highway continues as Route 76 west
1.000 mi = 1.609 km; 1.000 km = 0.621 mi: Concurrency terminus
