= Cross Roads, Stone County, Missouri =

Unincorporated community in Missouri, U.S.

Cross Roads
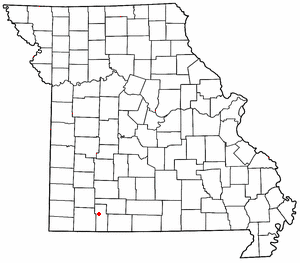

- Location within Missouri
- Coordinates: 36°49′19″N 93°31′59″W
- Country: United States
- State: Missouri
- County: Stone

Cross Roads is an unincorporated community in western Stone County, Missouri, United States. It is located at the intersection of State Routes 173 and 248, approximately four miles (6.4 km) west of Galena. Crossroads is part of the Branson, Missouri Micropolitan Statistical Area.
