= Stone County Courthouse (Missouri) =

- U.S. National Register of Historic Places
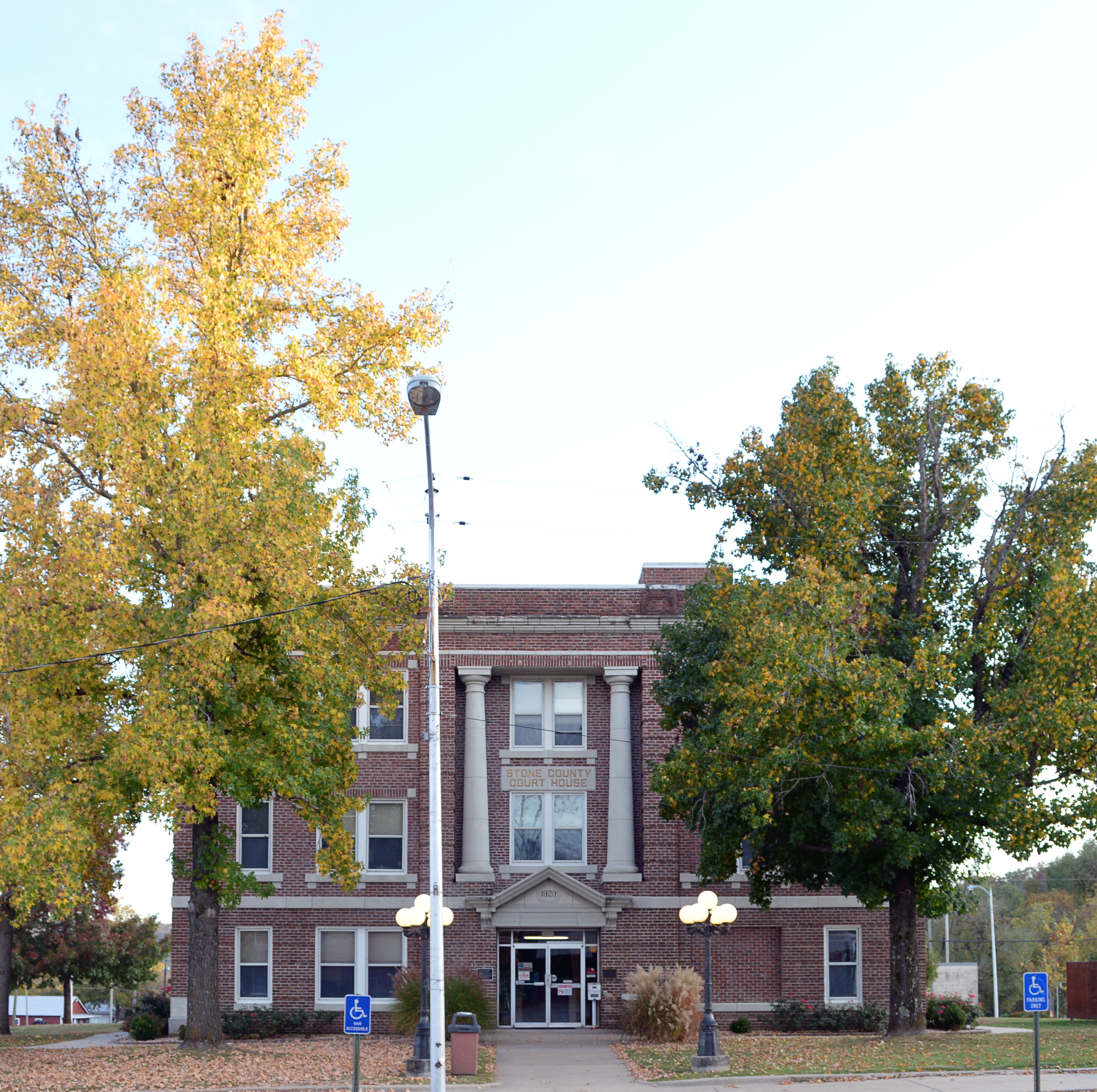
- Stone County Courthouse, October 2015

- Location within Missouri Location within the United States
- Interactive map showing the location of Stone County Courthouse
- Location: Public Square, Galena, Missouri
- Coordinates: 36°48′17″N 93°27′58″W
- Area: less than one acre
- Built: 1920
- Built by: Pauley Construction
- Architect: Sudholter & Co.
- Architectural style: Classical Revival
- NRHP reference No.: 80002396
- Added to NRHP: November 14, 1980

Stone County Courthouse is a historic courthouse located at Galena, Stone County, Missouri. It was built in 1920, and is a three-story, Classical Revival style brick building on a concrete foundation meaning that it does not have a basement. It features two colossal, modified Doric order columns on a recessed wall plane at the second and third stories. It cost $47,600 to complete.

It was listed on the National Register of Historic Places in 1980.

The courthouse is undergoing a $5 million, 14,000 square-foot expansion scheduled to be completed in summer 2019.
