= Missouri Route 173 =

State highway in Missouri, U.S.

Route 173
- MO 173 highlighted in red

Route information
- Maintained by MoDOT
- Length: 9.260 mi (14.903 km)

Major junctions
- South end: Route 76 in Cape Fair
- Route 248 in Crossroads
- North end: Route 265 / Route 413 in Elsey

Location
- Country: United States
- State: Missouri

Highway system
- Missouri State Highway System; Interstate; US; State; Supplemental
| ← Route 172 | → Route 174 |

Route 173 is a highway in southwestern Missouri. Its northern terminus is at Route 265/Route 413 in Elsey; its southern terminus is at Route 76 in Cape Fair.

== Route description ==
Route 173 begins at an intersection with Route 76 in Cape Fair, Stone County, heading north on a two-lane undivided road. The road passes through wooded areas with some homes, curving to the northwest. The route turns to the north again, running along the west bank of Table Rock Lake before crossing the lake. Route 173 passes through more forests, curving northwest before heading north through a mix of fields and woods with occasional residences. Farther north, the road comes to an intersection with Route 248. The route continues through more rural areas, turning northeast and crossing Missouri and Northern Arkansas Railroad's Aurora Subdivision. A short distance later, Route 173 reaches its northern terminus at an intersection with Route 265/Route 413 near Elsey.

== Major intersections ==
The entire route is in Stone County.

| Location | mi | km | Destinations | Notes |
|---|---|---|---|---|
| Cape Fair | 0.000 | 0.000 | Route 76 | |
| Crossroads | 6.921 | 11.138 | Route 248 | |
| Elsey | 9.260 | 14.903 | Route 265 / Route 413 | |
1.000 mi = 1.609 km; 1.000 km = 0.621 mi
