= Stoneridge, Missouri =

Unincorporated community in Stone County, Missouri, United States

Coordinates: 36°40′00″N 93°24′46″W

Stoneridge is an unincorporated community in Stone County, Missouri, United States. It is located in the Mark Twain National Forest along Missouri Route 13 and has a business route of that highway that passes through much of the community.
