= Dickerson Park Zoo =

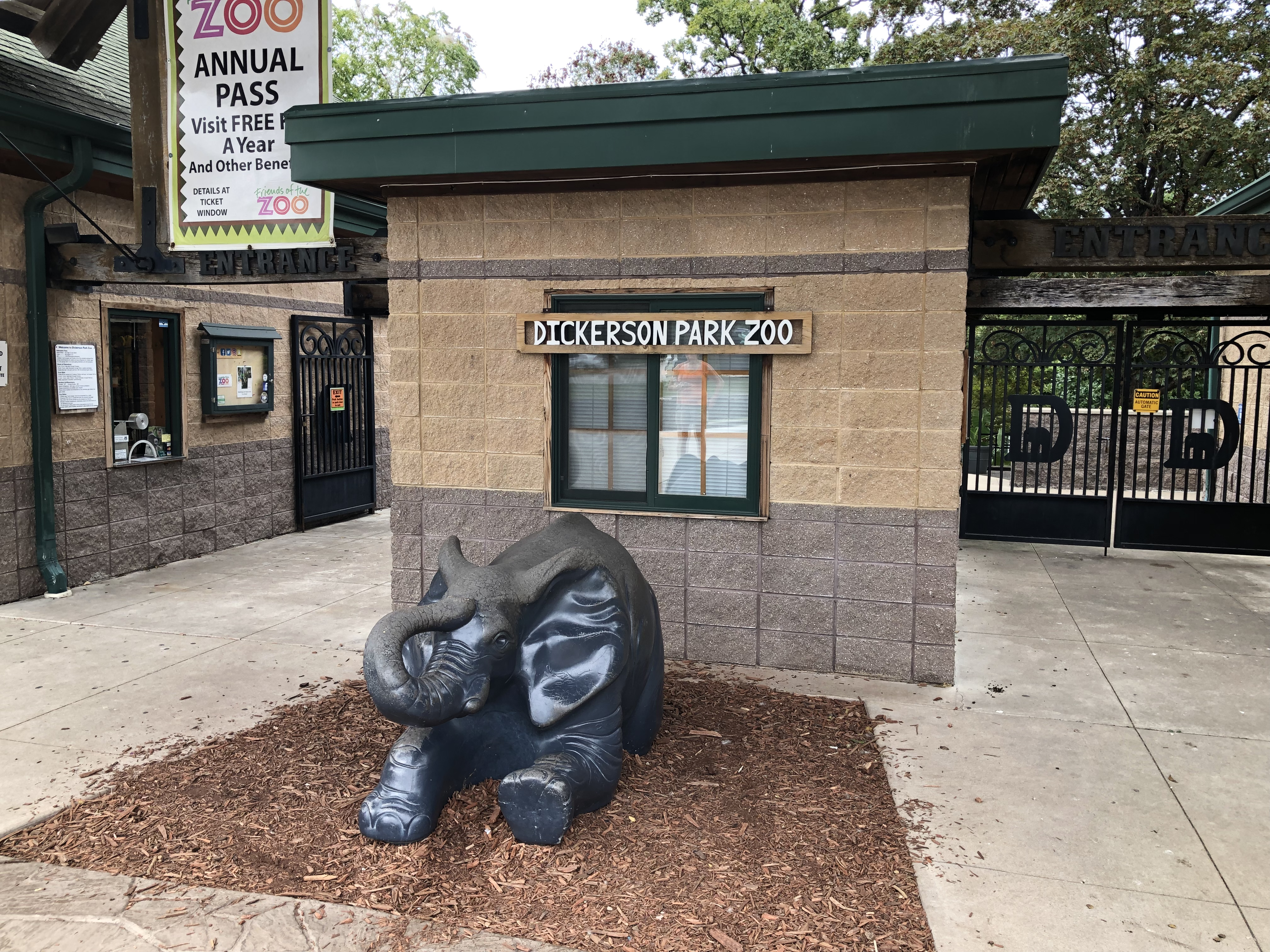
- Interactive map of Dickerson Park Zoo
- 37.2557°N 93.3095°W
- Date opened: 1922
- Location: Springfield, Missouri
- Memberships: Association of Zoos and Aquariums (AZA)
- Public transit: Springfield Transit Services
- Website: www.dickersonparkzoo.org

Dickerson Park Zoo is a zoological park located in Springfield, Missouri that has more than 500 animals that represent 160 different species. It is an accredited member of the Association of Zoos and Aquariums (AZA) since 1986.

== History ==
Dickerson Park was established by the Springfield Park Board in 1922 and developed with the aid of Works Progress Administration (WPA) labor and funds in the 1930s. From then until the 1970s, very little development or support occurred, and by 1975, the zoo became rundown. It was on the verge of being closed, but a commitment was made by the City of Springfield, and a support group was created known as Friends of the Zoo, to restore the zoo.

The Friends organization developed a membership base, launched education programs and gathered support from donors for new projects and improvements. The City of Springfield committed budget dollars and instituted an admission fee to help offset expenses.

The zoo's mission had the objectives of advancing recreation, education, conservation and research. A master plan, adopted in 1985, visualized a new zoo, with geographic themes and phased development.

The zoo became involved in Species Survival Plans, most notably Asian elephants, maned wolves and cheetahs. In-house and outreach education programs were offered to the community. The growth of tourism in the region contributed to increases in attendance and offered visitors to the community another attraction when visiting the Ozarks.

An update and revision of the master plan for the park was completed in 1996.

== Accidents and incidents ==
On October 4, 2013, the zoo euthanized one of its four elephants, the matriarch, a 41-year-old female known as Connie (AKA Pinky), who had been suffering from kidney disease and had lost nearly 1,000 pounds. Later, on October 11, another one of the zoo's elephants named Patience, (who had been reported as "hesitant and submissive" since the death of its Matriarch,) made a sudden movement and killed the zoo's head of elephants zookeeper John Bradford, age 62, who had been with the zoo since 1990. It is thought that Patience, (not understanding the reason for the euthanasia,) may have blamed the head zookeeper for Connie's death. The city said no disciplinary action would be taken against Patience, adding: "The animal will not be euthanized."
