= Tiff City, Missouri =

Unincorporated community in the U.S. state of Missouri

Coordinates: 36°40′06″N 94°37′02″W

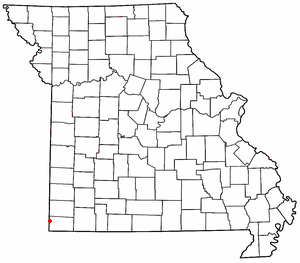

Tiff City is an unincorporated community in McDonald County, Missouri, United States. It is located on Route 76, bordering the Oklahoma state line. The community is part of the Fayetteville–Springdale–Rogers, AR-MO Metropolitan Statistical Area.

Tiff City was platted in 1881. The community was named for deposits of "tiff" ore near the original town site. A post office called Tiff City has been in operation since 1877.
