= Reeds Spring Junction, Missouri =

Unincorporated community in Missouri, U.S.

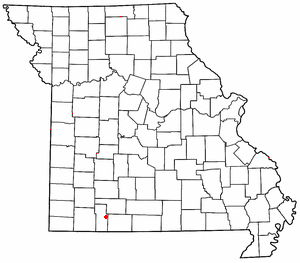

Reeds Spring Junction is an unincorporated community in eastern Stone County, Missouri, United States. It was so named as it was located on U.S. Route 160 at Route 248, a road which continued to the city of Reeds Spring two miles to the west. It had previously been known as Stults.

The community is no longer located on the main highway, as the highway was rebuilt to create a new highway to bypass Reeds Spring proper. The intersection was also moved, and the community is now located at Route 248 and a county road known as Old US Highway 160.

Reeds Spring Junction is part of the Branson, Missouri Micropolitan Statistical Area.

== Location ==
The Geographic Names Information System (GNIS) places the location of Reeds Spring at 36°44′59″N 93°22′41″W.

GNIS places the location of Stutts at 36°45′55″N 93°20′51″W, approximately two miles northeast of Reeds Spring.
