= Elsey, Missouri =

Unincorporated community in Missouri, U.S.

Coordinates: 36°51′15″N 93°32′27″W

Elsey is an Unincorporated community in Stone County, Missouri, United States. It is located at the intersection of State Routes 173 and 413 and is halfway between Galena and Crane. The community is part of the Branson, Missouri Micropolitan Statistical Area.

A post office called Elsey was established in 1900, and remained in operation until 1957. "Elsey" was a name assigned by postal officials.
