= Spokane, Missouri =

- Census-designated place
- Location of Spokane, Missouri
- Coordinates: 36°51′43″N 93°18′15″W
- Country: United States
- State: Missouri
- County: Christian

Area
  - Total: 3.31 sq mi (8.57 km^{2})
  - Land: 3.31 sq mi (8.57 km^{2})
  - Water: 0 sq mi (0.00 km^{2})
- Elevation: 1,335 ft (407 m)

Population (2020)
  - Total: 491
  - Density: 148.4/sq mi (57.28/km^{2})
- Time zone: UTC-6 (Central (CST))
  - Summer (DST): UTC-5 (CDT)
- ZIP code: 65754
- Area code: 417
- FIPS code: 29-69518
- GNIS feature ID: 0726870

Spokane (/spoʊˈkeɪn/ spoh-KAYN) is a census-designated place in Christian County, Missouri, United States. As of the 2020 census, Spokane had a population of 491. It is part of the Springfield, Missouri, Metropolitan Statistical Area.

== History ==
Spokane was laid out in 1893. The community was named after Spokane, Washington. A post office called Spokane has been in operation since 1892.

== Geography ==
Spokane is located at 36°51′43″N 93°18′15″W (36.861839, -93.304152).

According to the United States Census Bureau, the CDP has a total area of 0.84 square miles (2.18 km^{2}), all land.

== Demographics ==
Historical population
Census	Pop.	Note	%±
2020	491		—
U.S. Decennial Census

=== 2010 census ===
As of the census of 2010, there were 177 people, 56 households, and 50 families living in the CDP. The population density was 210.7 inhabitants per square mile (81.4/km^{2}). There were 64 housing units at an average density of 76.2 per square mile (29.4/km^{2}). The racial makeup of the CDP was 98.9% White and 1.1% from two or more races. Hispanic or Latino of any race were 0.6% of the population.

There were 56 households, of which 55.4% had children under the age of 18 living with them, 73.2% were married couples living together, 10.7% had a female householder with no husband present, 5.4% had a male householder with no wife present, and 10.7% were non-families. 8.9% of all households were made up of individuals, and 3.6% had someone living alone who was 65 years of age or older. The average household size was 3.16 and the average family size was 3.28.

The median age in the CDP was 29.3 years. 39% of residents were under the age of 18; 5% were between the ages of 18 and 24; 27.7% were from 25 to 44; 13.6% were from 45 to 64; and 14.7% were 65 years of age or older. The gender makeup of the CDP was 52.0% male and 48.0% female.

=== 2000 census ===
As of the census of 2000, there were 133 people, 38 households, and 34 families living in the CDP. The population density was 168.4 inhabitants per square mile (65.0/km^{2}). There were 46 housing units at an average density of 58.3 per square mile (22.5/km^{2}). The racial makeup of the CDP was 97.74% White and 2.26% Native American. Hispanic or Latino of any race were 0.75% of the population.

There were 38 households, out of which 63.2% had children under the age of 18 living with them, 78.9% were married couples living together, 13.2% had a female householder with no husband present, and 7.9% were non-families. 7.9% of all households were made up of individuals, and 5.3% had someone living alone who was 65 years of age or older. The average household size was 3.50 and the average family size was 3.69.

In the CDP, the population was spread out, with 42.1% under the age of 18, 5.3% from 18 to 24, 30.8% from 25 to 44, 16.5% from 45 to 64, and 5.3% who were 65 years of age or older. The median age was 28 years. For every 100 females, there were 98.5 males. For every 100 females age 18 and over, there were 97.4 males.

The median income for a household in the CDP was $35,417, and the median income for a family was $35,417. Males had a median income of $31,786 versus $13,958 for females. The per capita income for the CDP was $17,157. None of the population and none of the families were below the poverty line.

== Commerce and trade ==
The local business association is the Spokane/Highlandville Chamber of Commerce, denoting the strong link the communities of Spokane and Highlandville to the north. Spokane has fewer residents and encompasses less area than Highlandville, but is the main location for the local public junior high and high schools, and has more commercial structures and businesses.

== Education ==
It is in the Spokane R-VII School District.

Spokane School District operates four schools: one preschool facility, one elementary (K-5) school (located in Highlandville), one middle (6-8) school, and one high school (9-12).
