= Galena, Missouri =

- City
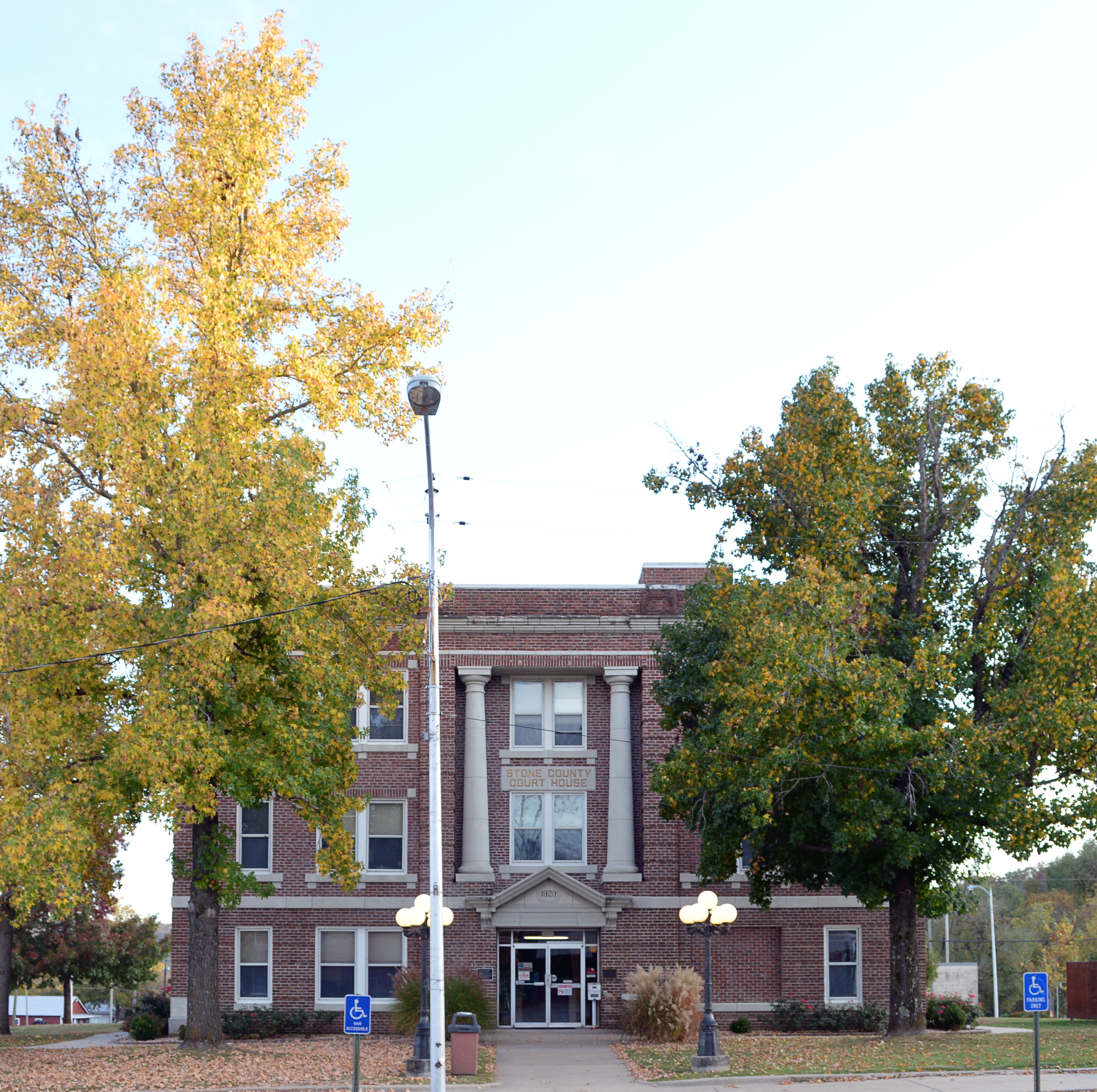
- Stone County Courthouse

- Location of Galena, Missouri
- Coordinates: 36°48′19″N 93°28′00″W
- Country: United States
- State: Missouri
- County: Stone

Government
  - Mayor: John Arrington

Area
  - Total: 0.76 sq mi (1.96 km^{2})
  - Land: 0.75 sq mi (1.93 km^{2})
  - Water: 0.012 sq mi (0.03 km^{2})
- Elevation: 1,017 ft (310 m)

Population (2020)
  - Total: 455
  - Density: 610.0/sq mi (235.53/km^{2})
- Time zone: UTC-6 (Central (CST))
  - Summer (DST): UTC-5 (CDT)
- ZIP codes: 65624, 65656
- Area code: 417
- FIPS code: 29-26254
- Website: www.galenacityhall.org

Galena is a city and the county seat in Stone County, Missouri, United States. The population was 455 at the 2020 census.

== History ==
Galena was platted in 1852, and named for deposits of the ore galena near the original town site. An early variant name was "Jamestown". A post office has been in operation at Galena since 1853. Roscoe Jackson was the last person to be publicly executed in the United States, which took place in Galena, in 1937.

== Geography ==
According to the United States Census Bureau, the city has a total area of 0.76 square miles (1.97 km^{2}), of which 0.75 square miles (1.94 km^{2}) is land and 0.01 square miles (0.03 km^{2}) is water. The James River flows past the east side of the town and enters the northernmost arm of Table Rock Lake to the south. The historic Y-Bridge over the James River is located just east of the town.

=== Climate ===
Climate data for Galena, Missouri (1991–2020 normals, extremes 1963–present)
Month	Jan	Feb	Mar	Apr	May	Jun	Jul	Aug	Sep	Oct	Nov	Dec	Year
Record high °F (°C)	76 (24)	84 (29)	89 (32)	96 (36)	95 (35)	105 (41)	107 (42)	110 (43)	105 (41)	92 (33)	86 (30)	80 (27)	110 (43)
Mean maximum °F (°C)	68.3 (20.2)	73.1 (22.8)	80.2 (26.8)	85.1 (29.5)	88.9 (31.6)	93.5 (34.2)	97.9 (36.6)	98.7 (37.1)	94.1 (34.5)	86.1 (30.1)	76.5 (24.7)	69.6 (20.9)	100.1 (37.8)
Mean daily maximum °F (°C)	45.0 (7.2)	49.7 (9.8)	58.9 (14.9)	68.5 (20.3)	76.6 (24.8)	85.1 (29.5)	89.3 (31.8)	89.2 (31.8)	81.7 (27.6)	70.4 (21.3)	58.2 (14.6)	47.3 (8.5)	68.3 (20.2)
Daily mean °F (°C)	33.4 (0.8)	37.6 (3.1)	46.4 (8.0)	55.8 (13.2)	64.9 (18.3)	73.8 (23.2)	77.7 (25.4)	77.2 (25.1)	68.8 (20.4)	57.3 (14.1)	45.6 (7.6)	36.4 (2.4)	56.2 (13.4)
Mean daily minimum °F (°C)	21.9 (−5.6)	25.5 (−3.6)	33.9 (1.1)	43.2 (6.2)	53.2 (11.8)	62.6 (17.0)	66.1 (18.9)	65.2 (18.4)	55.9 (13.3)	44.2 (6.8)	33.0 (0.6)	25.5 (−3.6)	44.2 (6.8)
Mean minimum °F (°C)	2.3 (−16.5)	8.6 (−13.0)	16.9 (−8.4)	26.4 (−3.1)	37.0 (2.8)	49.8 (9.9)	55.7 (13.2)	53.3 (11.8)	40.6 (4.8)	27.7 (−2.4)	17.0 (−8.3)	10.0 (−12.2)	−1.2 (−18.4)
Record low °F (°C)	−21 (−29)	−16 (−27)	2 (−17)	16 (−9)	28 (−2)	36 (2)	45 (7)	40 (4)	28 (−2)	17 (−8)	1 (−17)	−18 (−28)	−21 (−29)
Average precipitation inches (mm)	2.48 (63)	2.68 (68)	4.39 (112)	5.12 (130)	5.46 (139)	4.28 (109)	4.14 (105)	2.98 (76)	4.28 (109)	3.69 (94)	4.32 (110)	2.74 (70)	46.56 (1,183)
Average snowfall inches (cm)	3.6 (9.1)	1.1 (2.8)	1.4 (3.6)	0.0 (0.0)	0.0 (0.0)	0.0 (0.0)	0.0 (0.0)	0.0 (0.0)	0.0 (0.0)	0.0 (0.0)	0.0 (0.0)	0.8 (2.0)	6.9 (18)
Average precipitation days (≥ 0.01 in)	6.6	5.7	8.7	9.2	10.6	9.3	8.1	6.7	7.6	7.9	7.4	6.0	93.8
Average snowy days (≥ 0.1 in)	1.1	0.9	0.4	0.0	0.0	0.0	0.0	0.0	0.0	0.0	0.0	0.5	2.9
Source: NOAA

== Demographics ==
Historical population
Census	Pop.	Note	%±
1860	55		—
1870	27		−50.9%
1880	85		214.8%
1910	353		—
1920	390		10.5%
1930	508		30.3%
1940	507		−0.2%
1950	439		−13.4%
1960	389		−11.4%
1970	391		0.5%
1980	423		8.2%
1990	401		−5.2%
2000	451		12.5%
2010	440		−2.4%
2020	455		3.4%
U.S. Decennial Census

=== 2010 census ===
As of the census of 2010, there were 440 people, 179 households, and 116 families living in the city. The population density was 586.7 inhabitants per square mile (226.5/km^{2}). There were 239 housing units at an average density of 318.7 per square mile (123.1/km^{2}). The racial makeup of the city was 97.7% White, 0.9% Native American, 0.7% from other races, and 0.7% from two or more races. Hispanic or Latino of any race were 3.6% of the population.

There were 179 households, of which 30.2% had children under the age of 18 living with them, 45.8% were married couples living together, 14.5% had a female householder with no husband present, 4.5% had a male householder with no wife present, and 35.2% were non-families. 28.5% of all households were made up of individuals, and 15.1% had someone living alone who was 65 years of age or older. The average household size was 2.46 and the average family size was 3.03.

The median age in the city was 41.5 years. 22.5% of residents were under the age of 18; 9.1% were between the ages of 18 and 24; 22.5% were from 25 to 44; 29.2% were from 45 to 64; and 16.8% were 65 years of age or older. The gender makeup of the city was 46.6% male and 53.4% female.

=== 2000 census ===
As of the census of 2000, there were 451 people, 165 households, and 121 families living in the city. The population density was 659.7 inhabitants per square mile (254.7/km^{2}). There were 215 housing units at an average density of 314.5 per square mile (121.4/km^{2}). The racial makeup of the city was 98.23% White, 0.22% Asian, 0.22% from other races, and 1.33% from two or more races. Hispanic or Latino of any race were 0.44% of the population.

There were 165 households, out of which 33.3% had children under the age of 18 living with them, 57.0% were married couples living together, 13.9% had a female householder with no husband present, and 26.1% were non-families. 23.6% of all households were made up of individuals, and 9.7% had someone living alone who was 65 years of age or older. The average household size was 2.73 and the average family size was 3.20.

In the city the population was spread out, with 28.8% under the age of 18, 8.9% from 18 to 24, 24.2% from 25 to 44, 28.2% from 45 to 64, and 10.0% who were 65 years of age or older. The median age was 35 years. For every 100 females, there were 96.9 males. For every 100 females age 18 and over, there were 84.5 males.

The median income for a household in the city was $22,500, and the median income for a family was $24,423. Males had a median income of $22,396 versus $17,125 for females. The per capita income for the city was $9,673. About 23.4% of families and 30.0% of the population were below the poverty line, including 44.9% of those under age 18 and 13.9% of those age 65 or over.

== Notable people ==
- Pamela Pauly Chinnis, first female president of the House of Deputies of the Episcopal Church
- Dewey Short, U.S. representative from Missouri

== Transportation ==
- Missouri Route 176 (western terminus)
- Missouri Route 248
- Missouri Route 265
- Missouri Route 413

== Education ==
It is in the Galena R-II School District..

Galena R-II School District operates one elementary school and Galena High School.

Galena has a public library, a branch of the Stone County Library.
