= Cape Fair, Missouri =

Unincorporated community in Missouri, U.S.

Coordinates: 36°43′48″N 93°30′37″W

Cape Fair is an unincorporated community in Stone County, Missouri, United States. It is located on Route 76 and the southern terminus of Route 173. Cape Fair is on the west side of the James River arm of Table Rock Lake. The community is part of the Branson, Missouri Micropolitan Statistical Area. The ZIP Code for Cape Fair is 65624.

A post office called Cape Fair has been in operation since 1851. The community most likely was named for the river cape or sharp stream meander south of the original town site.

== Notable people ==
- Mel Hancock (1929–2011), U.S. representative from Missouri
