= Branson West, Missouri =

- City
- Location of Branson West, Missouri
- Coordinates: 36°42′18″N 93°22′16″W
- Country: United States
- State: Missouri
- County: Stone

Government
  - Mayor: Nita Jane Ayres

Area
  - Total: 4.72 sq mi (12.22 km^{2})
  - Land: 4.72 sq mi (12.22 km^{2})
  - Water: 0 sq mi (0.00 km^{2})
- Elevation: 1,368 ft (417 m)

Population (2020)
  - Total: 484
  - Density: 103/sq mi (39.6/km^{2})
- Time zone: UTC-6 (Central (CST))
  - Summer (DST): UTC-5 (CDT)
- ZIP code: 65737
- Area code: 417
- FIPS code: 29-07989
- GNIS feature ID: 1669588

Branson West is a city in Stone County, Missouri, United States. The population was 484 at the 2020 census.

== History ==
Originally known as Linchpin, the crossroads of highways 13 and 76 was officially called Lakeview until February 25, 1992, when the city officially changed its name to Branson West in an effort to capitalize on the explosive growth of neighboring Branson. The bid initially paid off as the population of Branson West grew from 37 to 408 between 1990 and 2000; growth has since tapered off, mostly due to the town's isolation and lack of nearby amenities.

== Geography ==
Branson West is located at 36°42′18″N 93°22′16″W (36.704978, -93.371245).

According to the United States Census Bureau, the city has a total area of 4.49 square miles (11.63 km^{2}), all land.

== Demographics ==
Historical population
Census	Pop.	Note	%±
1980	58		—
1990	37		−36.2%
2000	408		1,002.7%
2010	478		17.2%
2020	484		1.3%
U.S. Decennial Census

Branson West is part of the Branson, Missouri Micropolitan Statistical Area.

=== 2010 census ===
As of the census of 2010, there were 478 people, 179 households, and 127 families residing in the city. The population density was 106.5 inhabitants per square mile (41.1/km^{2}). There were 215 housing units at an average density of 47.9 per square mile (18.5/km^{2}). The racial makeup of the city was 91.4% White, 0.6% African American, 0.4% Asian, 3.6% from other races, and 4.0% from two or more races. Hispanic or Latino of any race were 11.9% of the population.

There were 179 households, of which 36.9% had children under the age of 18 living with them, 52.0% were married couples living together, 13.4% had a female householder with no husband present, 5.6% had a male householder with no wife present, and 29.1% were non-families. 25.1% of all households were made up of individuals, and 12.3% had someone living alone who was 65 years of age or older. The average household size was 2.67 and the average family size was 3.08.

The median age in the city was 36.4 years. 28% of residents were under the age of 18; 7.5% were between the ages of 18 and 24; 24.8% were from 25 to 44; 23.4% were from 45 to 64; and 16.1% were 65 years of age or older. The gender makeup of the city was 48.5% male and 51.5% female.

=== 2000 census ===
At the 2000 census, there were 408 people, 136 households and 107 families residing in the city. The population density was 218.5 inhabitants per square mile (84.4/km^{2}). There were 161 housing units at an average density of 86.2 per square mile (33.3/km^{2}). The racial makeup of the city was 95.10% White, 0.74% Native American, 1.23% Asian, 1.72% from other races, and 1.23% from two or more races. Hispanic or Latino of any race were 3.92% of the population.

There were 136 households, of which 41.2% had children under the age of 18 living with them, 60.3% were married couples living together, 12.5% had a female householder with no husband present, and 21.3% were non-families. 15.4% of all households were made up of individuals, and 2.9% had someone living alone who was 65 years of age or older. The average household size was 3.00 and the average family size was 3.31.

Age distribution was 31.9% under the age of 18, 9.6% from 18 to 24, 30.6% from 25 to 44, 19.4% from 45 to 64, and 8.6% who were 65 years of age or older. The median age was 31 years. For every 100 females, there were 108.2 males. For every 100 females age 18 and over, there were 101.4 males.

The median household income was $31,250, and the median family income was $30,313. Males had a median income of $20,179 versus $17,188 for females. The per capita income for the city was $12,326. About 9.3% of families and 12.2% of the population were below the poverty line, including 13.7% of those under age 18 and 7.1% of those age 65 or over.

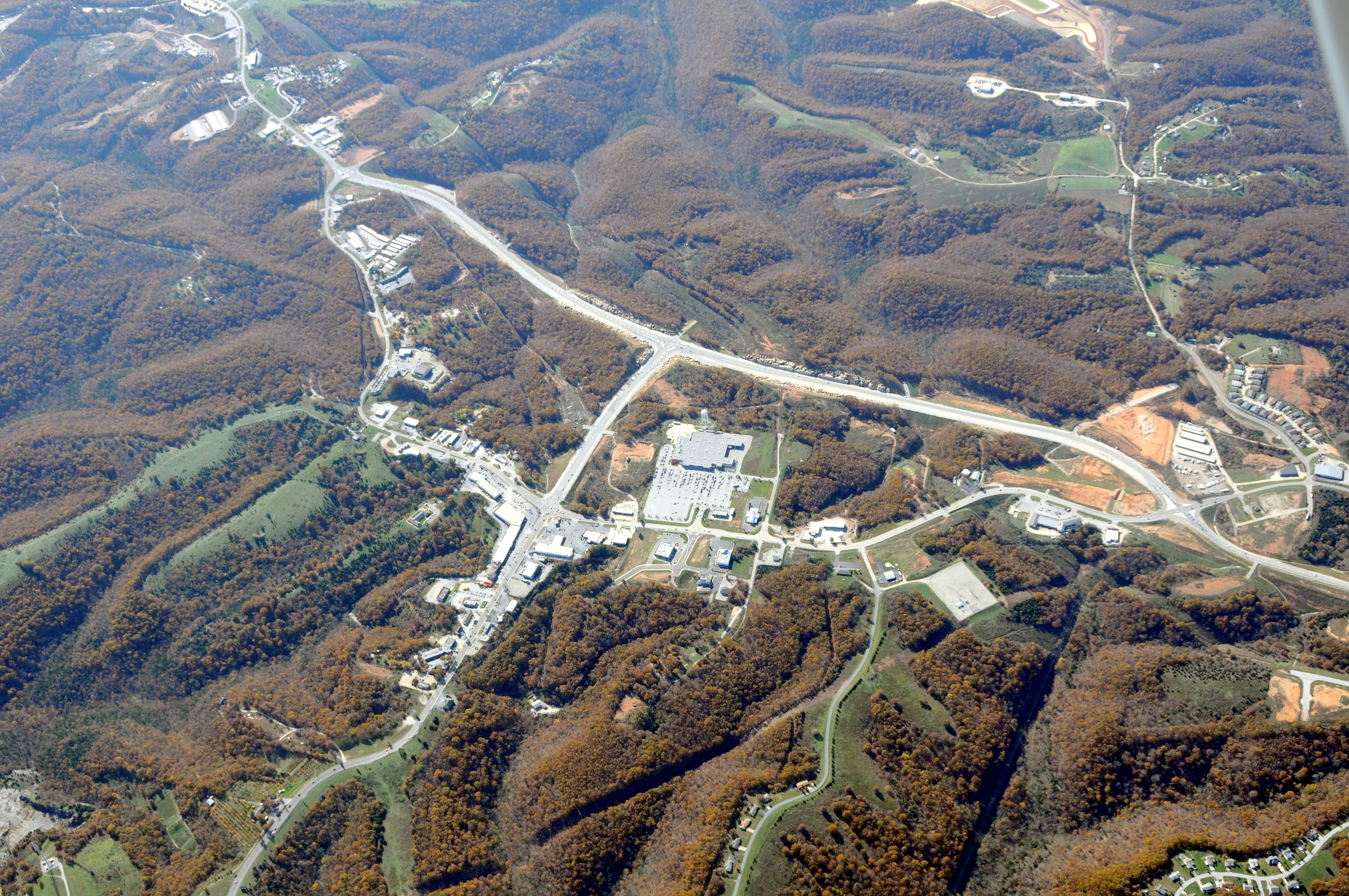
Aerial Photograph of Branson West, Missouri

== Education ==
It is in the Reeds Spring R-IV School District..

== Airport ==
Branson West Airport, also known as Branson West Municipal Airport, is a city-owned, public-use airport located two nautical miles (3.7 km) west of the central business district of the Branson West. The airport is also known as Emerson Field, named for Robert Emerson, an aviator and former owner of the property.

Funded via a federal grant of $16 million, it is a general aviation airport designed for private and charter aircraft. The airport was built on 200 acres (0.81 km^{2}) donated by The Conco Companies of Springfield, with an additional 40 acres (160,000 m^{2}) acquired by the city for runway protection zones. Another 450 acres (1.8 km^{2}) donated by Kay Renfro will be used for future development, and 200 acres (0.81 km^{2}) donated by city treasurer Martin Eastwood will serve as a conservation buffer zone.
