= Missouri Department of Transportation =

State department of transportation in Missouri, United States

Missouri Department of Transportation (MoDOT)

Agency overview
- Formed: 1907
- Superseding agency: Missouri Highways and Transportation Commission
- Jurisdiction: Missouri
- Headquarters: 105 W. Capitol Avenue, Jefferson City, Missouri 65101
- Employees: 5,100
- Annual budget: $3.2 billion (expenditures, FY 2021)
- Agency executives: Patrick K. McKenna, director; Mike Kehoe, Governor of Missouri
- Parent agency: State of Missouri
- Website: www.modot.org

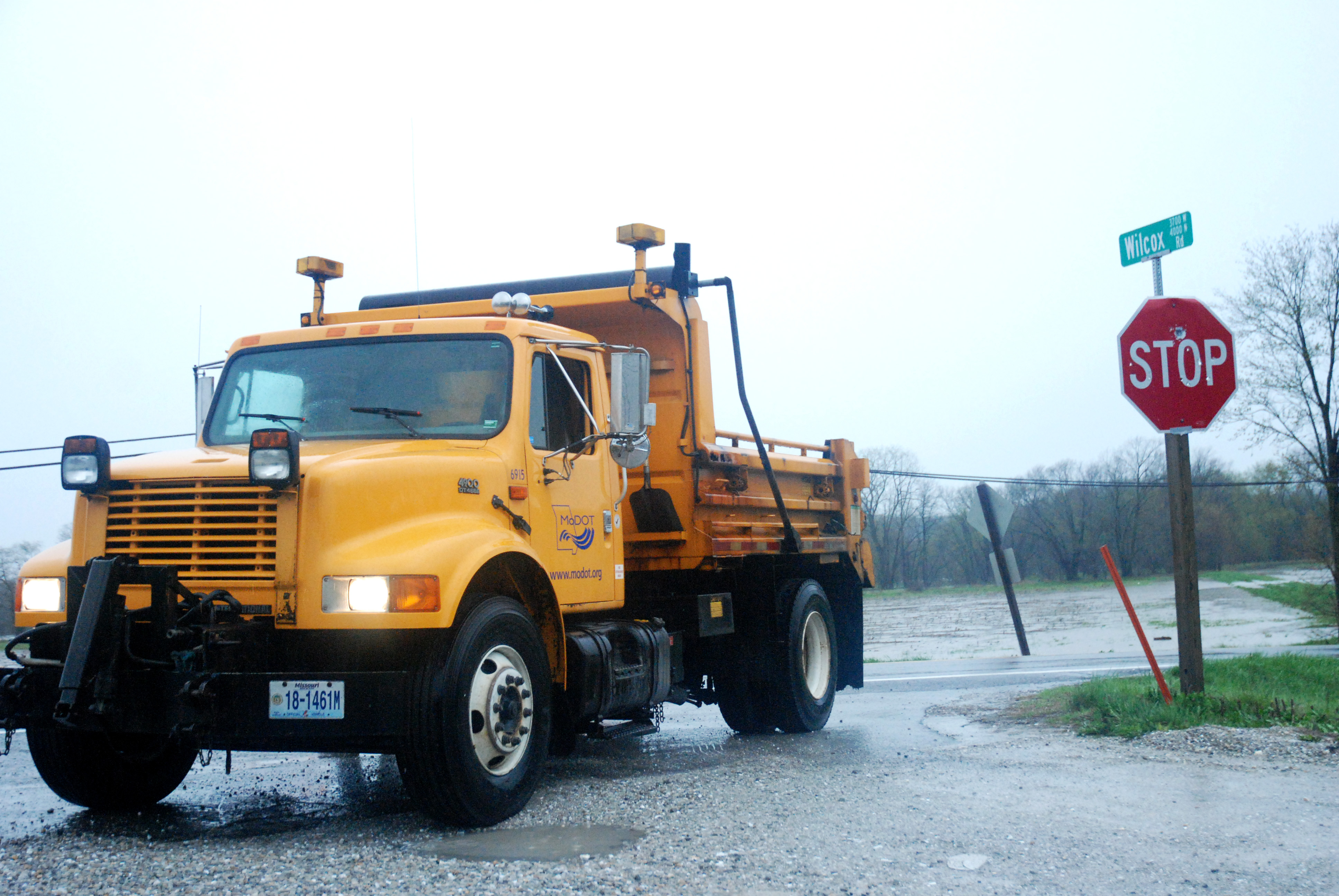
Missouri Department of Transportation workers set up road block signs in Boone County to warn drivers of flooding

The Missouri Department of Transportation (MoDOT, /moʊˈdɒt/) is a state government organization in charge of maintaining public roadways of the U.S. state of Missouri under the guidance of the Missouri Highways and Transportation Commission (MHTC). MoDOT designs, builds and maintains roads and bridges, improves airports, river ports, railroads, public transit systems and pedestrian and bicycle travel.

In 1979, voters of the State passed a constitutional amendment merging the State Highway Department with the Department of Transportation, becoming the Missouri Highways and Transportation Department. In 1996, the Missouri Highways and Transportation Department became the Missouri Department of Transportation by legislative action. The Missouri Highways and Transportation Commission, a six-member bipartisan board, governs the Department. MHTC members are appointed by the governor and are confirmed by the Missouri Senate. No more than three commission members may be of the same political party. The Commission appoints the MoDOT director.

MoDOT has been one of the leaders in the construction of the diverging diamond interchange, having built the first such interchange in the United States in June 2009 in Springfield.

== Regional Districts ==
MoDOT operates seven districts throughout the state:

- Northwest, based in St. Joseph
- Northeast, based in Hannibal
- Kansas City, based in Lee's Summit
- Central, based in Jefferson City
- St. Louis, based in Chesterfield
- Southwest, based in Springfield
- Southeast, based in Sikeston
