= Eastview =

Eastview and East View may refer to:

== Place names ==
=== United States ===
- Eastview, Kentucky
- Eastview, Missouri
- Eastview, New York
- Eastview, Tennessee
- East View, West Virginia
- Eastview High School in Apple Valley, Minnesota

=== Canada ===
- Eastview, Frontenac County, Ontario
- Eastview, the former name of Vanier, Ontario
- Eastview, Saskatoon, a neighbourhood in Saskatoon, Saskatchewan

== Other ==
- East View Geospatial, a mapping company
- Eastview High School
- East View (house), a heritage-listed house in Melbourne, Victoria, Australia
- Eastview Mall, a shopping centre in New York state
- East View Stakes
- HMCS Eastview (K665), a ship of the Canadian Navy
