= Trigger Creek =

Stream in the American state of Missouri

Trigger Creek is a stream in the Taney County, Missouri. The stream headwaters are just east of Missouri Route JJ and it flows northeast passing under Route J between Kirbyville to the northwest and Mincy to the southeast. The stream enters Bull Shoals Lake about 1.5 miles northeast of Route J.

The source is located at: 36°34′06″N 93°09′21″W and the confluence is at: 36°35′57″N 93°06′30″W.

Trigger Creek was so named on account of frequent flash flooding (i.e. as fast as a "trigger").

== See also ==
- List of rivers of Missouri
