= Shepherd of the Hills State Park =

State park in Missouri, United States

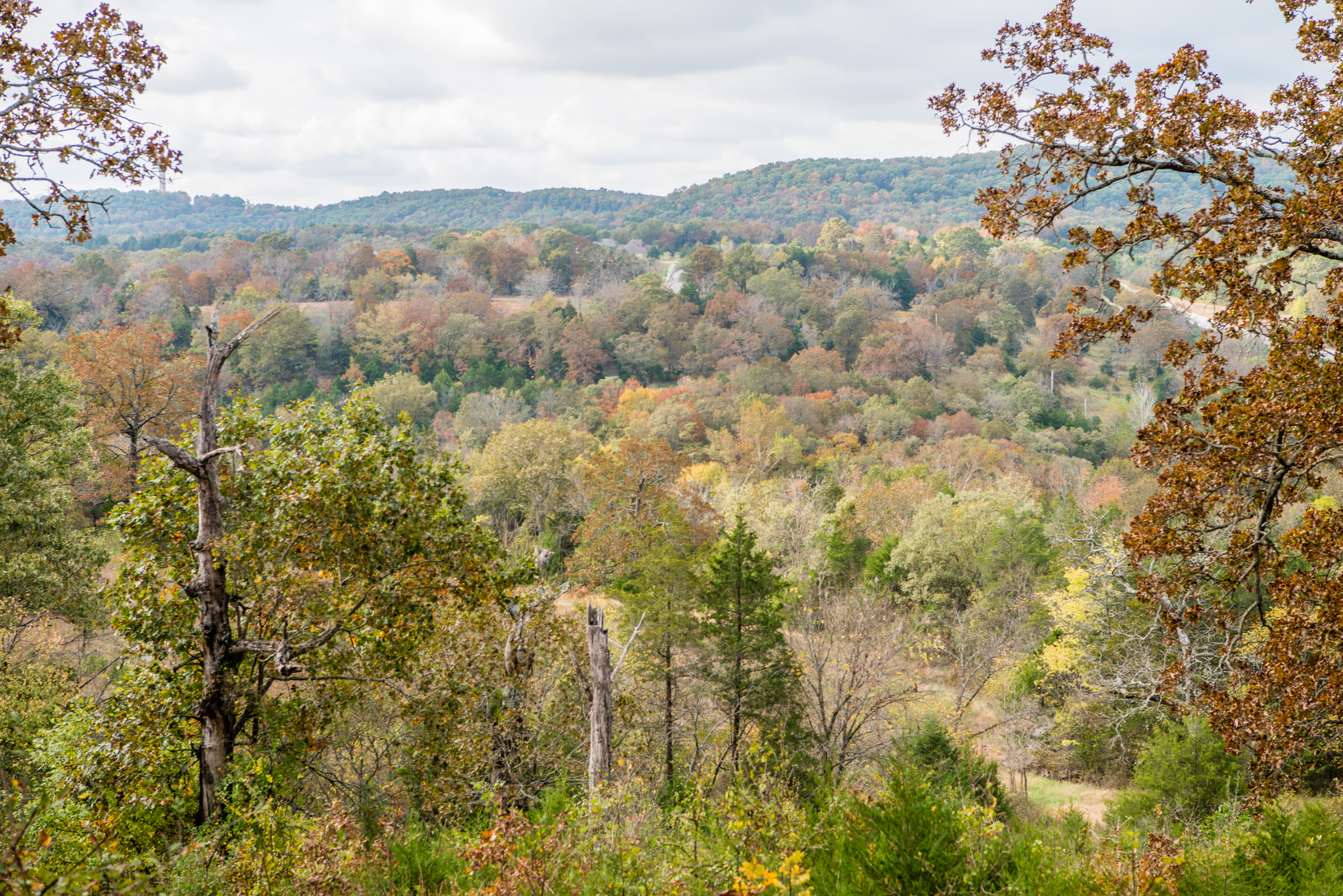

- Location within Missouri Location within the United States
- Location: Taney County, Missouri, United States
- Coordinates: 36°41′30″N 93°18′07″W
- Area: 1,011 acres (409 ha)
- Elevation: 853 ft (260 m)
- Established: 2016
- Administrator: Missouri Department of Natural Resources
- Website: Official website

Shepherd of the Hills State Park is an undeveloped public recreation area covering 1,011 acres (409 ha) in Taney County, Missouri. The state park is closed pending public input on future uses of the land. It was one of three new parks announced by Governor Jay Nixon in December 2016. It shares a border with the Ruth and Paul Henning Conservation Area and is traversed by more than two miles of Roark Creek, including a stretch of the three-mile-long East Fork Roark Creek. The site includes a one-room schoolhouse that served the former community of Garber. On May 4, 2022, Missouri State Parks announced that park's name will be changed from Ozark Mountain State Park to Shepherd of the Hills State Park. The name change honors Harold Bell Wright's popular novel The Shepherd of the Hills, which is set in the vicinity of the park.
