= Bull Creek, Missouri =

- Village
- Location of Bull Creek, Missouri
- Coordinates: 36°42′55″N 93°12′07″W
- Country: United States
- State: Missouri
- County: Taney

Area
  - Total: 0.17 sq mi (0.43 km^{2})
  - Land: 0.17 sq mi (0.43 km^{2})
  - Water: 0 sq mi (0.00 km^{2})
- Elevation: 735 ft (224 m)

Population (2020)
  - Total: 426
  - Density: 2,554.9/sq mi (986.47/km^{2})
- Time zone: UTC-6 (Central (CST))
  - Summer (DST): UTC-5 (CDT)
- ZIP code: 65616
- Area code: 417
- FIPS code: 29-09642
- GNIS feature ID: 2397491

Bull Creek is a village in northwest Taney County, Missouri, United States. The population was 426 at the 2020 census. It is part of the Branson, Missouri Micropolitan Statistical Area.

== Geography ==
The community is on the northeast side of the Bull Creek floodplain approximately two miles west of Rockaway Beach and Lake Taneycomo. The community lies on Missouri Route F one mile east of U.S. Route 65 and two miles southwest of Meriam Woods and U.S. Route 160.

According to the United States Census Bureau, the village has a total area of 0.16 square miles (0.41 km^{2}), all land.

== Demographics ==
Historical population
Census	Pop.	Note	%±
2000	225		—
2010	603		168.0%
2020	426		−29.4%
U.S. Decennial Census

=== 2010 census ===
As of the census of 2010, there were 603 people, 199 households, and 162 families living in the village. The population density was 3,768.8 inhabitants per square mile (1,455.1/km^{2}). There were 235 housing units at an average density of 1,468.8 per square mile (567.1/km^{2}). The racial makeup of the village was 88.7% White, 1.3% African American, 0.2% Native American, 0.7% Asian, 0.8% Pacific Islander, 4.8% from other races, and 3.5% from two or more races. Hispanic or Latino of any race were 10.1% of the population.

There were 199 households, of which 66.3% had children under the age of 18 living with them, 30.2% were married couples living together, 42.2% had a female householder with no husband present, 9.0% had a male householder with no wife present, and 18.6% were non-families. 13.1% of all households were made up of individuals, and 4.5% had someone living alone who was 65 years of age or older. The average household size was 3.03 and the average family size was 3.23.

The median age in the village was 21.5 years. 43.3% of residents were under the age of 18; 14.3% were between the ages of 18 and 24; 25.3% were from 25 to 44; 13.6% were from 45 to 64; and 3.6% were 65 years of age or older. The gender makeup of the village was 44.1% male and 55.9% female.

=== 2000 census ===
As of the census of 2000, there were 225 people, 80 households, and 55 families living in the village. The population density was 1,315.6 inhabitants per square mile (508.0/km^{2}). There were 104 housing units at an average density of 608.1 per square mile (234.8/km^{2}). The racial makeup of the village was 93.78% White, 0.89% Native American, 2.22% from other races, and 3.11% from two or more races. Hispanic or Latino of any race were 4.00% of the population.

There were 80 households, out of which 42.5% had children under the age of 18 living with them, 47.5% were married couples living together, 12.5% had a female householder with no husband present, and 31.3% were non-families. 25.0% of all households were made up of individuals, and 3.8% had someone living alone who was 65 years of age or older. The average household size was 2.81 and the average family size was 3.35.

In the village, the population was spread out, with 36.0% under the age of 18, 8.4% from 18 to 24, 30.7% from 25 to 44, 21.3% from 45 to 64, and 3.6% who were 65 years of age or older. The median age was 29 years. For every 100 females, there were 97.4 males. For every 100 females age 18 and over, there were 92.0 males.

The median income for a household in the village was $21,667, and the median income for a family was $31,042. Males had a median income of $16,719 versus $16,250 for females. The per capita income for the village was $10,411. About 19.6% of families and 23.8% of the population were below the poverty line, including 41.5% of those under the age of eighteen and 25.0% of those 65 or over.
