= Powersite, Missouri =

Unincorporated community in Missouri, U.S.

Coordinates: 36°39′20″N 93°07′17″W

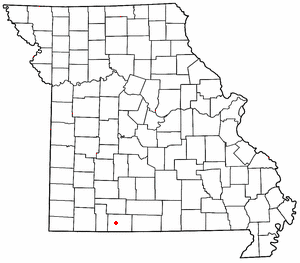

Powersite is an unincorporated community in Taney County, Missouri, United States. It is located across Lake Taneycomo from Forsyth on the southeast end of Powersite Dam. The community is part of the Branson, Missouri Micropolitan Statistical Area.

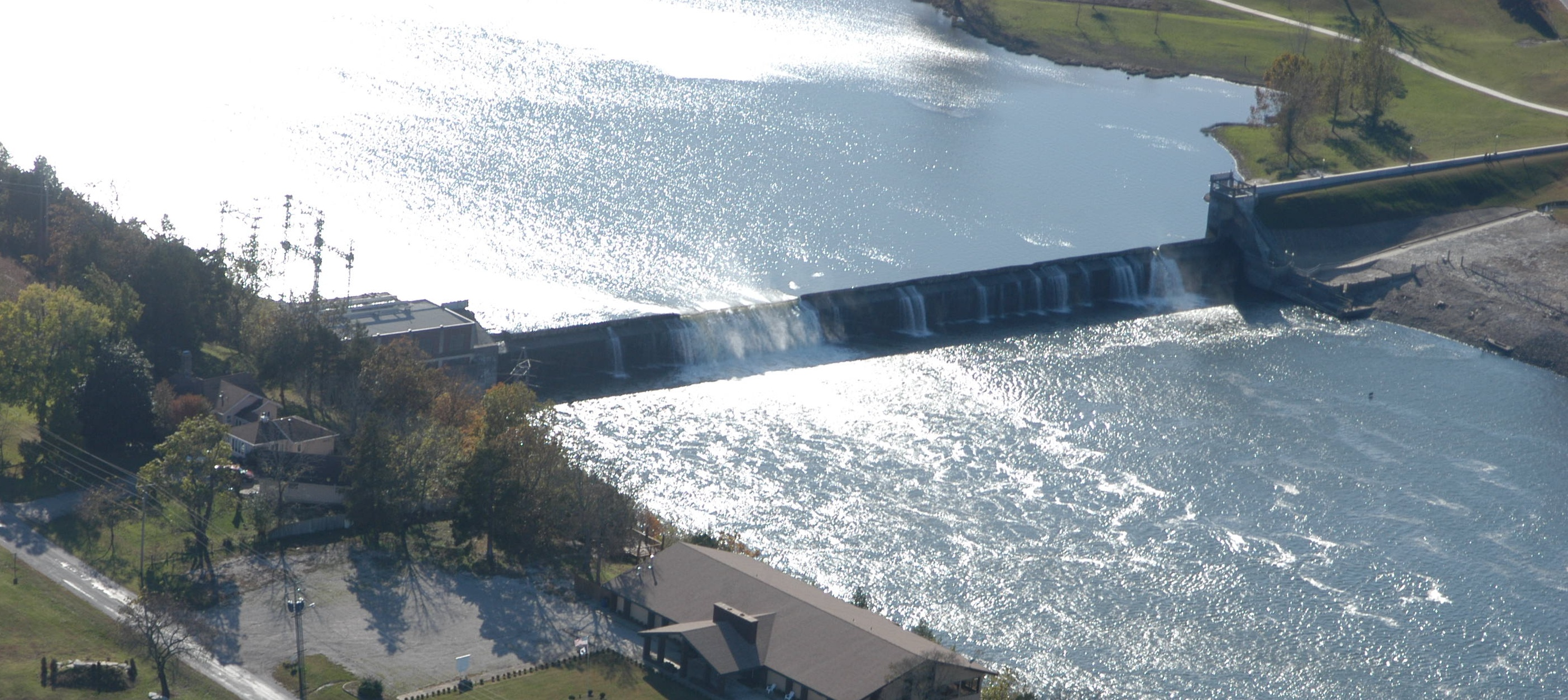
Powersite Dam

A post office called Powersite has been in operation since 1913. The community most likely took its name from nearby Powersite Dam.
