= Missouri Route 176 =

State highway in Missouri, U.S.

Route 176
- MO 176 highlighted in red

Route information
- Maintained by MoDOT
- Length: 32.606 mi (52.474 km)

Major junctions
- West end: Route 248 / Route 265 / Route 413 in Galena
- US 160 / Route 13 near Spokane; US 65 near Day
- East end: US 160 north of Forsyth

Location
- Country: United States
- State: Missouri

Highway system
- Missouri State Highway System; Interstate; US; State; Supplemental
← Route 175	→ Route 177

Route 176 is a highway in southwestern Missouri. The eastern terminus is at U.S. Route 160 north of Forsyth; its western terminus is at Route 248/Route 265/Route 413 in Galena.

== Route description ==
MO 176 starts at a junction with U.S Route 160, approximately two miles north of Downtown Forsyth. The Route immediately drops sharply to the White River valley to become the Main Street of Rockaway Beach, a former resort town on the White River/Lake Taneycomo. The route then climbs out of the valley to once again meet Route 160, for which it has a short concurrency. After leaving Route 160, Route 176 travels North-Northwest towards Route 65. Near the Taney-Christian County Line, Route 176 shares a 0.9 mile concurrency with Route 65. Route 176 then curves Northwest towards Spokane. At Spokane, Route 176 has a wrong-way concurrency with US 160 & Route 13. Two miles east of Abesville, Route 176 heads west to Galena, where the route ends at routes 248, 265, and 413/Ozark Mountain Parkway.

== Major intersections ==
County	Location	mi	km	Destinations	Notes
Stone	Galena	0.000	0.000	Route 248 / Route 265 / Route 413	
Christian	South Galloway Township	8.760	14.098	US 160 east / Route 13 south – Reeds Spring	Western end of US 160 / Route 13 overlap
Christian	Spokane	11.377	18.310	US 160 west / Route 13 north – Highlandville	Eastern end of US 160 / Route 13 overlap
Taney	Jasper Township	18.860	30.352	US 65 north	Western end of US 65 overlap
Taney	Jasper Township	19.757	31.796	US 65 – Branson	Eastern end of US 65 overlap
Taney	Jasper Township	24.529	39.476	US 160 west to US 65	Western end of US 160 overlap
Taney	Merriam Woods	27.234	43.829	US 160 east – Forsyth	Eastern end of US 160 overlap
Taney	Swan Township	32.606	52.474	US 160	
1.000 mi = 1.609 km; 1.000 km = 0.621 mi: Concurrency terminus
