= Ozark Beach, Missouri =

Unincorporated community in Missouri, U.S.

Coordinates: 36°39′32″N 93°08′20″W

Ozark Beach is an unincorporated community in Taney County, in the Ozarks of southern Missouri. The site is on the shoreline of Lake Taneycomo, approximately one mile west (upstream) of Powersite Dam.

== History ==
Ozark's founding in 1912 coincided with the inundation of the nearby artificial lake. A post office called Ozark Beach was established in 1919, and remained in operation until 1959.
