= Brownbranch, Missouri =

Unincorporated community in Missouri, U.S.

- Community
- Location of Brownbranch, Missouri Brownbranch, Missouri (the United States)
- Coordinates: 36°47′40″N 92°49′51″W
- Country: U. S. A.
- State: Missouri
- County: Taney County
- Elevation: 276 m (906 ft)
- Time zone: UTC-6 (CST)
  - Summer (DST): UTC-5 (CDT)
- GNIS feature ID: 749046

Brownbranch is an unincorporated community in northeastern Taney County, Missouri, United States. It is located on Beaver Creek at the intersection of Route 76 and Missouri Supplemental Route W, approximately 23 miles (37 km) northeast of Forsyth. Bradleyville lies about 5.7 miles (9.2 km) to the west on Route 76 and McClurg lies about 3.5 miles (5.6 km) to the east on Route W. The community is part of the Branson, Missouri Micropolitan Statistical Area.

Brownbranch had a post office from 1875 to 1962 (known as Brown Branch for the first 20 years). The community was named after the Brown family, which lived at a nearby creek.
