= Kentucky Hollow =

Stream valley in Missouri, U.S.

Kentucky Hollow is a stream valley in northeastern Taney County in the Ozarks of southern Missouri. The stream is a northwest flowing tributary to Beaver Creek. Its confluence with Beaver is 1.5 miles east of Bradleyville. The stream is bridged by Missouri Route 76 about one half mile south of the confluence. The stream is within the Mark Twain National Forest.

Source coordinates are: 36°44′52″N 92°51′43″W; mouth coordinates are: 36°46′54″N 92°52′53″W.

Kentucky Hollow was named for the fact a large share of the first settlers were natives of Kentucky.
