= Dickens, Missouri =

Unincorporated community in Missouri, U.S.

Coordinates: 36°43′39″N 93°02′51″W

Dickens is an unincorporated community in north central Taney County, in the U.S. state of Missouri. The community is located on Missouri Route 76, approximately one mile southwest of Taneyville and 4.5 miles northeast of Forsyth.

== History ==
A variant name was "Taney City". A post office called Taney City was established in 1858, and closed in 1894, and a post office called Dickens was in operation from 1899 until 1958. The present name possibly is a tribute to novelist Charles Dickens.
