= Downing Street Historic District =

Historic district in Missouri, United States

- U.S. National Register of Historic Places
- U.S. Historic district
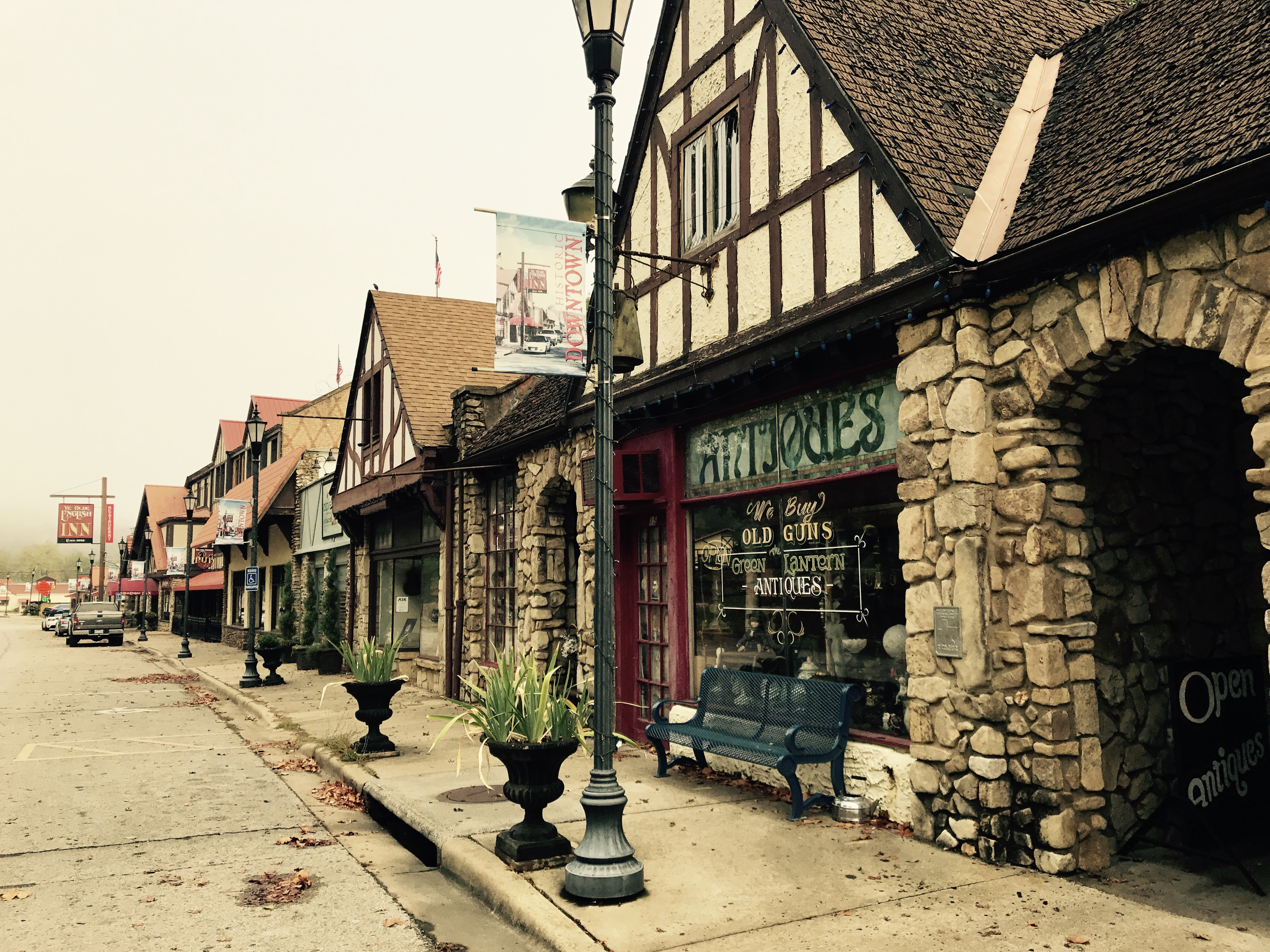

- Location within Missouri Location within the United States
- Location: Downing St. between 3rd and 4th Sts., Hollister, Missouri
- Coordinates: 36°37′23″N 93°12′56″W
- Area: 1.5 acres (0.61 ha)
- Built: 1909
- Architect: Multiple
- Architectural style: Colonial, Elizabethan
- NRHP reference No.: 78001678
- Added to NRHP: December 29, 1978

Downing Street Historic District, also known as The English Village, is a national historic district located at Hollister, Taney County, Missouri. The district encompasses 12 contributing buildings built between 1909 and the 1920s as part of a planned village in the Tudor Revival style. The buildings feature walls made of stone and stucco in a light beige color, with decorative boards painted a dark brown. Notable buildings include the U.S. Post Office - Gwinn Ceramics, Christian Science Society, Ye Old English Inn, and Hollister City Hall (formerly Missouri Pacific Railroad Depot, 1910).

It was listed on the National Register of Historic Places in 1978.
