= McClurg, Missouri =

Unincorporated community in Missouri, U.S.

Coordinates: 36°47′04″N 92°46′30″W

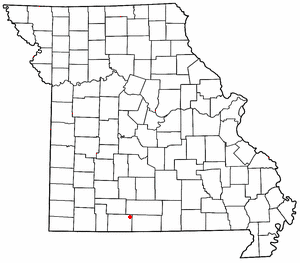

McClurg is an unincorporated community in extreme northeastern Taney County, Missouri, United States. It is located on Missouri Supplemental Route W, approximately three miles (five km) east of Brownbranch or twenty miles (32 km) northeast of Forsyth. McClurg is part of the Branson, Missouri Micropolitan Statistical Area.

A post office called McClurg was established in 1894, and remained in operation until 1993. The community has the name of Joseph W. McClurg, 19th governor of Missouri.
