= Bald Knobbers =

Vigilante group in the Missouri Ozarks in the 1880s

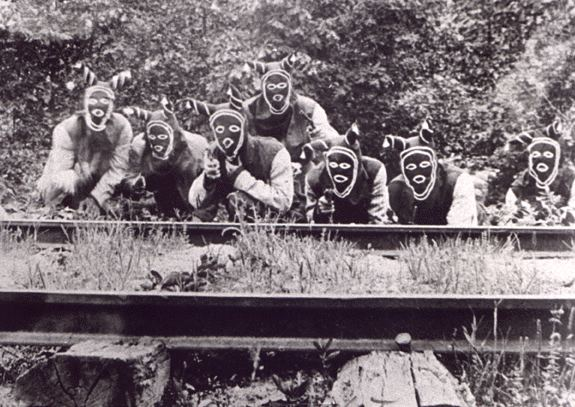
Depiction of Bald Knobbers in the lost 1919 film The Shepherd of the Hills

The Bald Knobbers were a group of vigilantes in the Ozark region of southwest Missouri, United States from 1885 to 1889. They are commonly depicted wearing black horned hoods with white outlines of faces painted on them, a distinction that evolved during the rapid proliferation of the group into neighboring counties from its Taney County origins. The group got its name from the grassy bald knob summits of the nearby Ozark Mountains. The hill where they first met, Snapp's Bald, is located just north of Kirbyville, Missouri. An article in the October 5, 1898, issue of the Springfield, Missouri, Leader-Democrat states:

Henry Westmoreland is in from Beaver County, Oklahoma, which was formerly a part of the strip known as No-Man's-Land. He says grass is in abundance and cattle plenty, but no efforts are made at raising crops there, except roughness and alfalfa. The venerable gentleman owned a ranch in Taney County at the time of the Bald Knob uprising, and was the man who gave that organization its name.

The Bald Knobbers, who for the most part had sided with the Union in the American Civil War, were opposed by the Anti-Bald Knobbers, who for the most part had sided with the Confederates. Hernando summarizes their political role:

They began as a group dedicated to protecting life and property, aiding law enforcement officials in the apprehension of criminals, opposing corruption in local government, and punishing those who violated the social and religious mores of their community. In some places, the vigilantes gained much political influence, occupied key offices, and became effectively the ruling faction in local politics. They made many enemies, however, with whom they had several violent, sometimes fatal, confrontations.

== Background ==
During the Civil War, Missouri as a border state was hard hit by neighbor-against-neighbor fighting. After the war the internal fighting continued throughout the state with perhaps the most famous being the actions of the James–Younger Gang. Authorities had a difficult time bringing the criminal fighting under control because both sides still held strong partisan supporters. Between 1865 and 1885, Taney County reported there were 40 murders and not a single suspect was ever convicted. The Bald Knobbers initially set out to put an end to the marauding gangs, but the Bald Knobbers were to end up having their own excesses and criminal activities.

== The Taney County chapter ==
In 1883, thirteen men led by Nat N. Kinney formed the group, in retaliation against the hordes of invading marauders that had plagued the area since the start of the Reconstruction Era. The original thirteen were Nat Kinney, James A. DeLong, Alonzo S. Prather, Yell Everett, James B. Rice, T. W. Phillips, James R VanZandt, Pat F. Fickle, Galba E. Branson, J. J. Brown, Charles H. Groom, James K. Polk McHaffie, and possibly Ben Price. During the period of 1865–1882, over thirty murders were committed, none leading to a conviction. The group was called both the "Citizen's Committee" and "The Law and Order League" by its members. However, because their secret meetings were held atop a "bald" mountaintop (in order to keep a lookout for spies), the public began to refer to them as the Bald Knobbers. As their numbers grew into the hundreds, out of a county of only 7,000 people, the original intent began to lose focus. Though initially praised for driving out the notorious outlaws, public sentiment soon turned against them.

Although the men initially wore nothing more than a simple kerchief over their lower faces, if any disguise at all, many soon adopted a simple white muslin hood with corners tied off like ears, and cut out eye and mouth holes. This fearsome appearance only inflamed the anti-sentiment, peaking with the formation of the anti-Bald Knobbers. The Bald Knobbers were made up of both Democrats and Republicans. Nat Kinney was a Democrat and had run for office as such, though he had fought for the Union Army. Newer reports say that Kinney was a Republican, but this is false. The anti-Bald Knobbers were also from both sides of the political aisle. When the county courthouse burned down, both rival sides pointed fingers at each other, intensifying the bitterness between the groups.

This loosely knit anti-Bald Knobber faction was best represented by the 19-year-old orphan Andy Coggburn. Coggburn hated Kinney, a very persuasive individual with a mysterious past, who had moved into the area with his family two years before the Bald Knobbers came into being. Coggburn took great pleasure in deriding Kinney, pulling pranks and speaking out against the vigilante gang. Kinney and his fellow Bald Knobbers held considerable pull in the county, and in no time Coggburn was shot and killed by Kinney in "self defense" outside the local church of Forsyth, where Kinney had gone to preach that night.

In 1886, after gaining national notoriety from their exploits, and embarrassing state leaders, Missouri Governor John S. Marmaduke sent Adjutant General J. C. Jamison to Forsyth to investigate the situation. Upon arrival, although the representative was pleased to see the atmosphere of order that prevailed, he recommended to Kinney that an official dissolution of the Bald Knobbers would be in the best interest of the county. That next day a formal dissolution ceremony was held in the town square where the Bald Knobbers were publicly disbanded, having served their original purpose.

== The Christian County chapter ==
Neighboring counties such as Christian, Douglas, Greene, and Stone had already adopted the idea of masked night riders, and disregarded the strict rules that had governed the original Taney county chapter. The Christian County group became the most notorious by far. At the time Chadwick was the most bustling town of Christian County due to the nearby railroad, and a prime market for timber made into railroad ties. However, Chadwick's design as a "railroad town" meant that saloons and brothels dominated the area, providing the local population with the means to gamble and consume alcohol in public.

In a move towards moral straightening, the Christian County chapter was led by Dave Walker. However, his seventeen-year-old son Billy Walker was a wild force within their group. Though it is rumored the Walkers had invited Nat Kinney from neighboring Taney County to help institute the Christian County chapter, it is doubtful this occurred since Kinney had recently disbanded the original group himself. There were also several differences between the groups. The Christian County group held meetings at a large cave on the edge of the Walkers' land, and the members wore black hoods with cork or wooden horns protruding out of the top, decoratively designed with white or red stripes around the eyes, mouth, and horns, and sometimes with tassels dangling off the horn points. The members also routinely burned down saloons, and were generally more threatening than the Taney County group had been.

William Edens was a young opponent of the group, and would publicly criticize them. After he received several warnings (including a late-night beating), tragedy struck. The night of March 11, 1887, the Christian County group met at the cave to discuss disbanding. However, that night new members were inducted, and several members were incensed by new remarks William Edens had made about the band. As the meeting finished, many of the younger men headed home the long way, towards the Edens' cabin. Captain David Walker pleaded with them not to go, but his son Billy and several others, including Wiley Mathews, were headstrong.

When the men discovered that Edens was not home, they continued up the road to the cabin of James and Elizabeth Edens, William's parents. William Edens and his sick wife, Emma, were staying the night. So were James and Elizabeth's daughter Melvina who was sick with the measles, Melvina's husband, Charles Green, and the Green children ages three years and three months. The Bald-Knobbers busted in the windows and splintered in the doors of the tiny cabin, spraying shotgun blasts as they intruded. In the gunshot exchange, William Edens and Charles Green were killed, James Edens seriously wounded from an axe blow to the head and Bald Knobbers William Walker and John Mathews shot. The wails of the women and children led neighbors to the scene of the massacre. First to arrive was Charles Green's father, George Green, who lived near enough to hear the shots.

Though Dave Walker had attempted to prevent the men in his group from letting their actions escalate, his very presence in the nearby road at the time of the attack ultimately doomed him. After 80 men were indicted and tried in a series of worldwide-media covered trials over the course of the next 18 months, it was ultimately decided that four would hang for the crimes: Dave Walker, his young son Billy, Deacon John Mathews and his nephew Wiley Mathews. Wiley would later escape the county's new jail, leaving the three others to be punished for the reign of the vigilantes.

As the Christian County men awaited their fate in jail, old rivalries ran rampant. A group of Anti-Bald Knobbers, still unsatisfied with the outsider Kinney's intrusion into their community, met together and selected an assassin for their cause. In August 1888, farmer Billy Miles entered a store where Kinney was inventorying for the courts, and killed the ex-Bald Knobber leader with three shots from his pistol. He then stepped outside and surrendered to the law, claiming self-defense. The event made worldwide news, and Billy Miles was given full exoneration in very little time.

Back in Christian County, the execution date came to bear on May 10, 1889. After a late night of prayer services and repentance, the next morning the three men were led out into an enclosed area and onto a scaffolding the sheriff built himself, despite not having any prior hanging experience in executing prisoners. After last-minute prayers and final goodbyes between a father and son, the trap was sprung. Onlookers watched the three men twist and writhe on ropes that were too long. The condemned men's feet dragged along the ground, and at one point young Billy's rope broke, leaving him writhing on the ground and calling out for help. He was re-hanged, and after thirty-four minutes, the last of them finally died. Public criticism of the botched executions ran rampant.

Taney County's loose Bald Knobber threads were being tied together at long last as well, as the law officially sought vengeance for Nat Kinney's untimely assassination. Sheriff Galba Branson enlisted the aide of an out-of-state bounty hunter named Ed Funk. Together they sought Billy Miles on the Fourth of July, 1889. After visiting several Independence Day celebrations, they finally found him at a spring with a group of men on the edge of the Kirbyville Picnic. They approached him with warning shots, and a gunfight broke out between the ex-Bald Knobber supporters, the Anti-Bald Knobber supporters, and the lawmen. Both Funk and Branson were killed, and Billy Miles and his brothers fled the area.

== Cultural impact ==
Though the Kirbyville Shootout is seen as the general end to the story of the Bald Knobbers, there was at least one more quiet incident in 1890 involving an adulterer being lynched by a band of masked men, and here and there lie undocumented stories about unofficial retributions involving masked hoodlums in neighboring counties all the way up into the 1920s. Bald Knobber stories made headlines across the country at the time, and again as the original Bald Knobbers passed away.

As early as 1887 the Bald Knobber story was already being translated into popular culture as a play titled The Bald Knob Tragedy of Taney and Christian Counties. The start of Branson-area and Taney County tourism began with the 1907 publication of Harold Bell Wright's The Shepherd of the Hills, which features generic Bald Knobbers as the story's villains. Later, the Mabe family began a local country and western comedy revue called Baldknobbers (one word, and named solely for the humorous quality of the name rather than for any historical purpose); the Mabe family attraction started the music-show presence for which Branson has become famous.

More recent Bald Knobber-related fare includes the indoor roller-coaster ride, Fire in the Hole, at the Silver Dollar City theme park; it is a ride through a Bald Knobber theme, but not specifically grounded in any historical events. Starting in 2000, the White River Valley Historical Society in Forsyth began producing a "Law Day" festival, featuring a Bald Knobber pageant focusing on the Taney County Bald Knobber history. A documentary produced about the vigilantes, featuring several reenactments, original locations, and descendants of either side, entitled Fire on the Mountain: Bald Knobbers as Heroes or Villains of the Ozarks Frontier?, premiered at several film festivals beginning in the spring of 2007 (winning the Gold Remi Award at Worldfest in Houston, Texas), and had its television premiere on January 13, 2011, on the OPT Missouri PBS station as part of their Ozarks Reflections series.
