= EVG =

EVG may refer to:

- East View Geospatial, an American map company
- Eisenbahn- und Verkehrsgewerkschaft, a German trade union
- Elvitegravir
- Sveg Airport, in Sweden
- German initialism for Europäische Verteidigungsgemeinschaft, the European Defence Community (1952)
