= Merriam Woods, Missouri =

- City
- Location of Merriam Woods, Missouri
- Coordinates: 36°42′50″N 93°09′48″W
- Country: United States
- State: Missouri
- County: Taney

Government
  - Mayor: Rob Amos

Area
  - Total: 1.51 sq mi (3.92 km^{2})
  - Land: 1.51 sq mi (3.92 km^{2})
  - Water: 0 sq mi (0.00 km^{2})
- Elevation: 932 ft (284 m)

Population (2020)
  - Total: 2,006
  - Density: 1,324.2/sq mi (511.27/km^{2})
- Time zone: UTC-6 (Central (CST))
  - Summer (DST): UTC-5 (CDT)
- FIPS code: 29-47520
- GNIS feature ID: 2399318
- Website: http://merriamwoodsmo.org/

Merriam Woods is a city in Taney County, Missouri, United States. The population was 2,006 at the 2020 census. It is part of the Branson, Missouri Micropolitan Statistical Area.

== Geography ==
Merriam Woods is located along U.S. Route 160 and Missouri Route 176 approximately two miles north-northwest of Rockaway Beach and Lake Taneycomo.

According to the United States Census Bureau, the city has a total area of 1.60 square miles (4.14 km^{2}), all land.

== Demographics ==
Historical population
Census	Pop.	Note	%±
1990	601		—
2000	1,142		90.0%
2010	1,761		54.2%
2020	2,006		13.9%
U.S. Decennial Census

=== 2020 census ===
As of the 2020 census, Merriam Woods had a population of 2,006. The median age was 35.4 years. 27.6% of residents were under the age of 18 and 13.7% of residents were 65 years of age or older. For every 100 females there were 101.0 males, and for every 100 females age 18 and over there were 96.6 males age 18 and over.

97.0% of residents lived in urban areas, while 3.0% lived in rural areas.

There were 716 households in Merriam Woods, of which 38.4% had children under the age of 18 living in them. Of all households, 47.8% were married-couple households, 17.9% were households with a male householder and no spouse or partner present, and 22.9% were households with a female householder and no spouse or partner present. About 19.8% of all households were made up of individuals and 7.6% had someone living alone who was 65 years of age or older.

There were 815 housing units, of which 12.1% were vacant. The homeowner vacancy rate was 0.9% and the rental vacancy rate was 8.3%.

Racial composition as of the 2020 census
Race	Number	Percent
White	1,701	84.8%
Black or African American	11	0.5%
American Indian and Alaska Native	23	1.1%
Asian	7	0.3%
Native Hawaiian and Other Pacific Islander	2	0.1%
Some other race	90	4.5%
Two or more races	172	8.6%
Hispanic or Latino (of any race)	192	9.6%

=== 2010 census ===
As of the census of 2010, there were 1,761 people, 671 households, and 472 families living in the city. The population density was 1,100.6 inhabitants per square mile (424.9/km^{2}). There were 842 housing units at an average density of 526.3 per square mile (203.2/km^{2}). The racial makeup of the village was 94.1% White, 0.3% African American, 1.2% Native American, 0.1% Asian, 1.1% from other races, and 3.2% from two or more races. Hispanic or Latino of any race were 3.4% of the population.

There were 671 households, of which 37.3% had children under the age of 18 living with them, 47.5% were married couples living together, 15.2% had a female householder with no husband present, 7.6% had a male householder with no wife present, and 29.7% were non-families. 21.9% of all households were made up of individuals, and 8.6% had someone living alone who was 65 years of age or older. The average household size was 2.62 and the average family size was 3.01.

The median age in the city was 34.7 years. 27.8% of residents were under the age of 18; 8.7% were between the ages of 18 and 24; 27.3% were from 25 to 44; 23.2% were from 45 to 64; and 12.9% were 65 years of age or older. The gender makeup of the city was 49.2% male and 50.8% female.

=== 2000 census ===
As of the census of 2000, there were 1,142 people, 468 households, and 326 families living in the village. The population density was 809.0 inhabitants per square mile (312.4/km^{2}). There were 586 housing units at an average density of 415.1 per square mile (160.3/km^{2}). The racial makeup of the village was 98.34% White, 0.44% Native American, 0.18% from other races, and 1.05% from two or more races. Hispanic or Latino of any race were 0.88% of the population.

There were 468 households, out of which 28.6% had children under the age of 18 living with them, 54.7% were married couples living together, 9.6% had a female householder with no husband present, and 30.3% were non-families. 23.7% of all households were made up of individuals, and 10.3% had someone living alone who was 65 years of age or older. The average household size was 2.44 and the average family size was 2.85.

In the village, the population was spread out, with 26.0% under the age of 18, 6.0% from 18 to 24, 25.6% from 25 to 44, 23.4% from 45 to 64, and 19.1% who were 65 years of age or older. The median age was 39 years. For every 100 females, there were 94.9 males. For every 100 females age 18 and over, there were 91.6 males.

The median income for a household in the village was $24,132, and the median income for a family was $26,359. Males had a median income of $22,554 versus $19,107 for females. The per capita income for the village was $13,528. About 17.5% of families and 22.8% of the population were below the poverty line, including 39.6% of those under age 18 and 4.2% of those age 65 or over.

== Education ==
Most of Merriam Woods is in the Branson R-IV School District. A portion is in the Forsyth R-III School District.

Branson High School is the comprehensive high school of the Branson district.
