= Cedar Creek, Missouri =

Unincorporated community in Missouri, U.S.

Coordinates: 36°34′44″N 92°59′52″W

Cedar Creek or Cedarcreek is an unincorporated community in Taney County, Missouri, United States. It is located approximately fifteen miles (45 minutes by car) southeast of Branson at the intersection of Missouri Supplemental Routes M and KK. The stream Cedar Creek lies about three miles north on route M. The community is part of the Branson, Missouri Micropolitan Statistical Area.

A post office called Cedar Creek was established in 1871, and the name was changed to Cedarcreek in 1894. The community takes its name from nearby Cedar Creek.
