= Roark Creek =

Stream in Taney County, Missouri, U.S.

Roark Creek is a stream in Taney County, Missouri. The stream begins at the junction of the West and East forks near the village of Garber. From there, the stream flows southeast to its junction with the White River in Branson. The Missouri Pacific Railroad line follows the stream and the West Fork Roark Creek northwest to Reeds Spring.

The source coordinates are 36°41′31″N 93°18′07″W, and its mouth lies at 36°39′04″N 93°12′55″W.

Roark Creek has the name of the local Roark family.

== See also ==
- List of rivers of Missouri
