= Roller Hollow =

Valley in the U.S. state of Missouri

Coordinates: 36°45′23″N 92°56′07″W

Roller Hollow is a valley in Taney County in the U.S. state of Missouri.

Roller Hollow has the name of the local Roller family.
