= Mildred =

Mildred may refer to:

== People ==
- Mildred (name), a given name (including a list of people and characters with the name)
- Saint Mildrith, 8th-century Abbess of Minster-in-Thanet
- Milred (died 772), Anglo-Saxon prelate, Bishop of Worcester
- Henry Mildred (1795–1877), South Australian politician
- Henry Hay Mildred (1839–1920), a son of Henry Mildred, lawyer and politician

== Places ==
Canada

- Mildred River, a tributary of La Trêve Lake in Québec

United States

- Mildred, Kansas
- Mildred, Minnesota
- Mildred, Missouri
- Mildred, Pennsylvania
- Mildred, Texas

== Other uses ==
- Mildred, a barquentine shipwrecked at Gurnard's Head in 1912 (see list of shipwrecks in 1912)
- Mildred (1797 ship)
