= Mildred, Missouri =

Unincorporated community in Missouri, U.S.

Coordinates: 36°38′13″N 93°05′58″W

Mildred is an unincorporated community in Taney County, in the Ozarks of southern Missouri. Mildred is located on Missouri Route 76, south of Forsyth and east of Kirbyville.

== History ==
A post office called Mildred was established in 1910, and remained in operation until 1934. An early postmaster gave the community the name of his daughter, Mildred Price.
