= Bradleyville =

Bradleyville may refer to one of the following places in the United States:

- Bradleyville, Michigan, an unincorporated community in Tuscola County
- Bradleyville, Missouri, an unincorporated community in Taney County
