= Abesville, Missouri =

Unincorporated community in Missouri, U.S.

Coordinates: 36°50′23″N 93°22′15″W

Abesville is an unincorporated community in east central Stone County, in the U.S. state of Missouri. Abesville is located on Missouri Route 176, approximately two miles west of U.S. Route 160 and the Stone – Christian county line.

== History ==
Abesville was laid out in the 1880s, and named after Abe Payne, the original owner of the town site. A post office called Abesville was established in 1906, and remained in operation until 1914.
