= Elsie Bates-Freund =

American artist (1912–2001)

- Born: Elsie Mari Bates; January 12, 1927; Mincy, Missouri
- Died: June 14, 2001 (aged 74); Little Rock, Arkansas
- Known for: Jewelry design

Elsie Mari Bates Freund (1912–2001) was an American studio art jeweler, watercolorist, and textile artist. She and her husband, Louis Freund, established an art school in Eureka Springs in 1941.

Elsie Bates was born on January 12, 1912, in Mincy, Missouri. She studied at the Kansas City Art Institute.

Bates married fellow artist H. Louis Freund in 1939. The couple established the summer Art School of the Ozarks, which they operated from 1940 to 1951. Her husband taught painting and drawing, while she taught craft-related classes, such as weaving and design.

The Freund school operated only during the summers. Elsie was able to study more, taking her first ceramics class at the Wichita Art Association in Kansas. This is where she began to develop a jewelry-making process that combined clay, glass, and, later—at the suggestion of a Florida shop owner—silver. Louis named the works "Elsaramics", but Elsie shortened this to "Elsa", which she stamped on her jewelry.

In 1995, Freund moved to Parkway Village, a retirement community in Little Rock. She died on June 14, 2001, in Little Rock, Arkansas.

Freund's work is in the Art Institute of Chicago, the Brooklyn Museum, the Cleveland Museum of Art, the Cooper Hewitt, the Corning Museum of Glass, the Metropolitan Museum of Art, the Smithsonian American Art Museum, and the Victoria and Albert Museum.
