= Cedar Creek (Bull Shoals Lake tributary) =

Stream in the American state of Missouri

Cedar Creek is a stream in Taney County, Missouri, United States. It is a tributary of Bull Shoals Lake. The stream headwaters are in the Mark Twain National Forest on the southwest flank of Lime Kiln Mountain. The stream flows generally west and enters the lake just south of Beaver Creek Park about four miles from its source.

The stream source is at 36°37′25″N 92°57′01″W and the confluence is at 36°37′24″N 93°01′30″W.

Cedar Creek was so named on account of cedar timber near its course.

== See also ==
- List of rivers of Missouri
