= Forsyth High School (Missouri) =

Public school in Missouri, United States

Coordinates: 36.6961°N 93.1188°W

Location
- 178 Panther Street; Forsyth, Taney County, Missouri 65653; United States

Information
- Type: Public high school
- School district: Forsyth R-III School District
- Principal: Phillip Guy
- Staff: 31.33 (on an FTE basis)
- Enrollment: 418 (2023-2024)
- Student to teacher ratio: 13.34
- Colors: Blue and white
- Nickname: Panthers
- Website: forsythpanthers.org

Forsyth High School (FHS) is a small rural high school located in Forsyth, Missouri, United States. It had an enrollment of about 411 students for the 2015-2016 school year. It is a part of the Forsyth R-III School District.

It is one of three high schools that takes students from Kirbyville R-VI School District (of Kirbyville).

Forsyth High School

== Academics ==
In 2005, the FHS FFA Forestry team took first place in the nation. In 2020, the FHS Forestry team took second place in the nation, with four members finishing individually in the top 20 and Nathaniel Guy finishing in 2nd place individually. In 2021, the FFA group won best team at the 2021 National Forestry competition in Indianapolis.

In April 2007 the FHS Math Team ("Mathletes") took first place in the state for their division.

The FHS class of 2007 holds the distinction of having the most valedictorians in one year, six students.

FHS participates in the dual enrollment program through Missouri State University and Ozarks Technical Community College. Dual enrollment classes earn students high school and college credit simultaneously. This program takes the place of other widely known programs such as International Baccalaureate and complements the Advanced Placement courses.

== Athletics ==
The 2006-2007 girls' tennis team made history when they advanced to the state final four, a first for any girls' team in the school's history.

Forsyth has a deep tradition in athletics and has visited the final four multiple times in boys' basketball and baseball in 2000. The school is a part of the Mid Lakes Conference and is a perennial contender in all conference competitions.
