= Taneyville, Missouri =

- Village
- Location of Taneyville, Missouri
- Coordinates: 36°44′16″N 93°02′08″W
- Country: United States
- State: Missouri
- County: Taney

Area
  - Total: 0.46 sq mi (1.18 km^{2})
  - Land: 0.46 sq mi (1.18 km^{2})
  - Water: 0 sq mi (0.00 km^{2})
- Elevation: 1,073 ft (327 m)

Population (2020)
  - Total: 274
  - Density: 600/sq mi (233/km^{2})
- Time zone: UTC-6 (Central (CST))
  - Summer (DST): UTC-5 (CDT)
- ZIP code: 65759
- Area code: 417
- FIPS code: 29-72232
- GNIS feature ID: 2399953

Taneyville is a village in Taney County, Missouri, United States. The population was 274 at the 2020 census. It is part of the Branson, Missouri Micropolitan Statistical Area.

== History ==
A post office called Taneyville has been in operation since 1894. The community name was derived from that of Taney County.

== Geography ==
Taneyville is located in north-central Taney County. The town lies along Missouri Route 76 between Bradleyville and Kissee Mills. The townsite is on a northeast–southwest trending ridge between Swan Creek to the northwest and Beaver Creek to the southeast. The site is at an elevation of 1,073 ft (327 m).

According to the United States Census Bureau, the village has a total area of 0.47 square miles (1.22 km^{2}), all land.

== Demographics ==
Historical population
Census	Pop.	Note	%±
1910	124		—
1920	142		14.5%
1930	128		−9.9%
1940	150		17.2%
1950	132		−12.0%
1960	134		1.5%
1970	188		40.3%
1980	300		59.6%
1990	279		−7.0%
2000	359		28.7%
2010	396		10.3%
2020	274		−30.8%
U.S. Decennial Census

=== 2010 census ===
As of the census of 2010, there were 396 people, 149 households, and 106 families living in the village. The population density was 842.6 inhabitants per square mile (325.3/km^{2}). There were 173 housing units at an average density of 368.1 per square mile (142.1/km^{2}). The racial makeup of the village was 96.7% White, 1.5% from other races, and 1.8% from two or more races. Hispanic or Latino of any race were 3.0% of the population.

There were 149 households, of which 38.3% had children under the age of 18 living with them, 47.0% were married couples living together, 16.8% had a female householder with no husband present, 7.4% had a male householder with no wife present, and 28.9% were non-families. 25.5% of all households were made up of individuals, and 10.7% had someone living alone who was 65 years of age or older. The average household size was 2.66 and the average family size was 3.18.

The median age in the village was 33.6 years. 33.3% of residents were under the age of 18; 5.9% were between the ages of 18 and 24; 25.4% were from 25 to 44; 22.5% were from 45 to 64; and 12.9% were 65 years of age or older. The gender makeup of the village was 48.7% male and 51.3% female.

=== 2000 census ===
As of the census of 2000, there were 359 people, 134 households, and 90 families living in the village. The population density was 797.8 inhabitants per square mile (308.0/km^{2}). There were 155 housing units at an average density of 344.5 per square mile (133.0/km^{2}). The racial makeup of the village was 97.49% White, 0.28% Pacific Islander, and 2.23% from two or more races. Hispanic or Latino of any race were 1.11% of the population.

There were 134 households, out of which 41.0% had children under the age of 18 living with them, 49.3% were married couples living together, 15.7% had a female householder with no husband present, and 32.1% were non-families. 21.6% of all households were made up of individuals, and 13.4% had someone living alone who was 65 years of age or older. The average household size was 2.68 and the average family size was 3.23.

In the village, the population was spread out, with 33.1% under the age of 18, 7.8% from 18 to 24, 28.7% from 25 to 44, 16.4% from 45 to 64, and 13.9% who were 65 years of age or older. The median age was 32 years. For every 100 females, there were 93.0 males. For every 100 females age 18 and over, there were 83.2 males.

The median income for a household in the village was $23,500, and the median income for a family was $27,841. Males had a median income of $23,393 versus $18,750 for females. The per capita income for the village was $10,220. About 12.9% of families and 17.4% of the population were below the poverty line, including 13.5% of those under age 18 and 8.5% of those age 65 or over.

== Education ==
It is in the Taneyville R-II School District, an elementary school district.
