= Branson Public Schools =

School district in Missouri

Branson Public Schools is a unified school district in Taney County, Missouri. The district includes that county's portion of Branson, the vast majority of that municipality, as well as Rockaway Beach, most of Merriam Woods, and the Taney County portion of Saddlebrooke.

The district has 4,789 students in grades PreK-12th grade, with a student-to-teacher ratio of 15:1 throughout the district.

== Branson High School ==
Branson High School

Location
- 935 Buchanan Branson, MO 65616; 36°41′49″N 93°13′56″W

Information
- Motto: “Empowering students to reach their maximum potential”
- Established: 1913
- NCES School ID: 290576000122
- Principal: Sara Strohm
- Teaching staff: 89.10 (FTE)
- Grades: 9–12
- Enrollment: 1,439 (2023–2024)
- Student to teacher ratio: 16.15
- Colors: Red and Black
- Athletics conference: Ozark Mountain Conference
- Mascot: Pirates
- Rival: Republic, Ozark, Harrison
- Publication: Pirate TV (News broadcast)
- Yearbook: “Buccaneer”
- Feeder schools: Cedar Ridge Elementary, Buchanan Intermediate, Cedar Ridge Intermediate, Buchanan Elementary, Branson Jr. High School, Kirbyville Middle School
- Website: www.branson.k12.mo.us/schools/bhs

Branson High School is a public high school in Branson, Missouri. Its the only high school in the district. BHS is the 55th largest high school in Missouri by student enrollment. Serving 1,448 students, Branson High School is the largest high school in Taney County.

It is one of three high schools that takes students from Kirbyville R-VI School District (of Kirbyville).

=== The Old Building ===
The current Branson High School was built in 2002, as a replacement to the old High School building, which is now used as the Branson Junior High, which teaches grades 7–8. The Junior High was built in 1974, and was the first building that was built for the district.
