= Scott Township, Taney County, Missouri =

Township in Taney County, Missouri, U.S.

Coordinates: 36.5769°N 93.1461°W

Scott Township is an active township in Taney County, in the U.S. state of Missouri.

Scott Township was founded in 1839, taking its name from the local Scott family.
