= Day, Missouri =

Unincorporated community in Missouri, U.S.

Coordinates: 36°48′47″N 93°14′38″W

Day is an unincorporated community in Taney County, in the Ozarks of southern Missouri. Day is located in the northwest part of the county, just south of the Taney-Christian county line on Missouri Route 176 and approximately one mile west of U.S. Route 65.

== History ==
A post office called Day was established in 1889, and remained in operation until 1957. Captain Madison Day, an early postmaster, gave the community his last name.
