= Grand Prairie Area Demonstration Project =

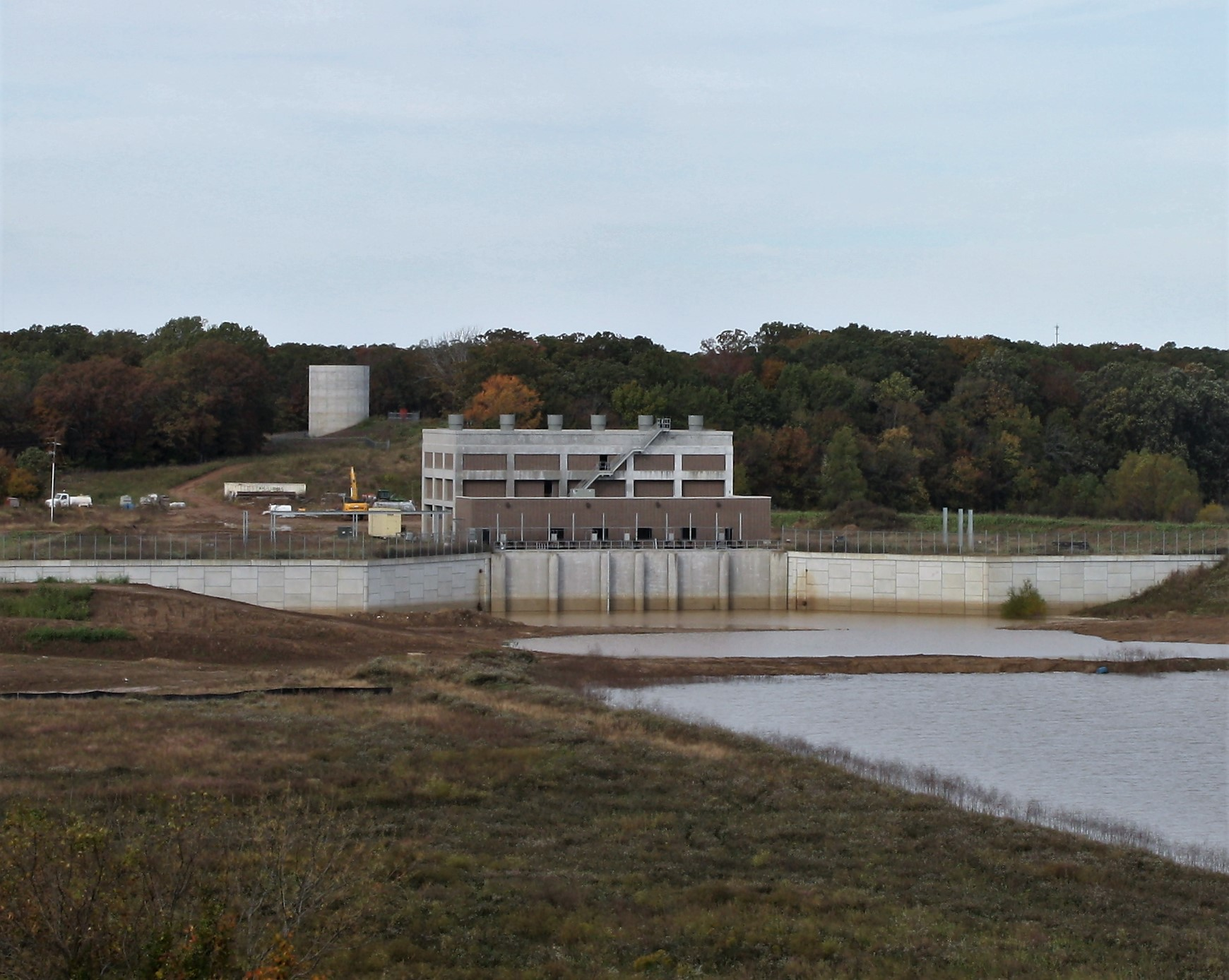
- Pump station at DeValls Bluff
- Begins: White River, DeValls Bluff, Arkansas; 37.829927°N 121.556894°W
- Official name: Grand Prairie Area Demonstration Project

Characteristics
- Capacity: 1,640 ft^{3} (46 m^{3}) per second

History
- Construction start: 1950

Map of project area

The Grand Prairie Area Demonstration Project is an interbasin transfer project to provide water to eastern Arkansas for the purposes of agricultural water supply, aquifer recharge, prairie and wetland restoration, water conservation and waterfowl management. The project, conceived by the US Army Corps of Engineers' Memphis District and approved by US Congress in 1950, generally involves the pumping of water from the White River near DeValls Bluff into pipelines and canals throughout Arkansas's Grand Prairie, specifically to farmers in Arkansas, Lonoke and Prairie counties. The new water source is intended to relieve groundwater pumping from the Alluvial and Sparta aquifers that underlie the Prairie.

== History ==
Initially authorized by the Flood Control Act of 1950, the project received $6 million ($80.3 million in today's dollars) from Congress. The act has been in various stages of planning or design ever since. Deferred in 1980 due to a lack of a strong local sponsor, the Grand Prairie-White River Irrigation District was formed by local leaders to continue project development. In 1983, the Arkansas Soil and Water Conservation Commission requested the US Army Corps of Engineers Vicksburg District conduct a study to determine the economic feasibility of the project.

== Opposition ==
The project has encountered significant delays from a variety of groups voicing opposition to the project, including environmentalists, farmers, landowners, taxpayers and duck hunters. The project was also delayed significantly following the discovery of the Ivory-billed woodpecker within the Cache River National Wildlife Refuge in 2004.

== Current status ==
As of 2014, the lower half of the pump station has been constructed at DeValls Bluff. The White River Irrigation District has not obtained subscribers to receive the water once pumping commences.

Costs continue to escalate, and the Corps of Engineers, along with State of Arkansas, have no way of projecting the final cost to complete the project to any certainty. Farmers are not willing to subscribe when the cost is unknown. Cost is a concern to farmers as a farmer's profit margins are already small. If the water can not be provided at a cost affordable to the farmers, there will not be any subscribers. On the other hand, if the project is not completed in the near future, there will not be any farm activity in the area as pumping water up from the aquifers is already becoming cost prohibitive.

Without the project, at current pumping rates, the aquifers will no longer be a source of water and the farming industry may decline in the area; the economies of the farming communities may suffer.

== See also ==
- Rice cultivation in Arkansas
