= Mincy, Missouri =

Unincorporated community in Missouri, U.S.

Coordinates: 36°33′51″N 93°06′37″W

Mincy is an unincorporated community in south-central Taney County, in the Ozarks of southern Missouri, United States. Mincy is located approximately four miles north of the Missouri-Arkansas border and near the upper end of Bull Shoals Lake of the White River. Mincy is the namesake for the Drury-Mincy Conservation Area to the south and east.

== History ==
A post office called Mincy was established in 1870, and remained in operation until 1955. The community has the name of the local Mincy family.

Elsie Bates-Freund was a native of Mincy.
