= East View Map Link =

Map Link
- Founded: Goleta, California, US, early 1990s
- Founder: Bill Hunt
- Defunct: 2010
- Headquarters: Goleta, California, US
- Website: http://maplink.com

Map Link was the largest map distributor in North America not affiliated with a major map publisher, and in terms of titles offered (over 100,000), it was the largest map distributor in the world. Until they closed, it was the largest supplier of maps to places outside the US for the Rand McNally retail travel and map stores. Until late 2008, it was the primary source of maps for Barnes & Noble. It continues to supply several other bookstore chains, and has been a major source of maps to map libraries.

Map Link was founded in 1984 as Pacific Travelers Supply, a map and travel store in central Santa Barbara. The brick-and-mortar retail business was spun off in the early 1990s, later changed its name to The Travel Store of Santa Barbara, and closed in 2013.

Map Link was based in Goleta, California, just outside Santa Barbara, in a converted lemon warehouse.

Map Link was also the publisher of a number of maps, usually of areas and topics not otherwise covered by other publishers. They were partners in Benchmark Maps, a publisher of state atlases and maps in the western United States.

The company filed for bankruptcy protection in 2008, but was unsuccessful in its attempts to reorganize and emerge from bankruptcy. In 2010, it was liquidated and its map assets and domain name were sold to East View Cartographic in Minnesota.

East View Map Link acquired Benchmark Maps in 2024.
