= HMCS Eastview =

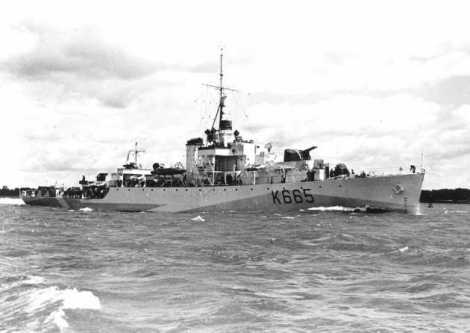
- HMCS Eastview

History

Canada
- Name: Eastview
- Namesake: Eastview, Ontario
- Operator: Royal Canadian Navy
- Ordered: October 1941
- Builder: Canadian Vickers, Montreal
- Yard number: 174
- Laid down: 26 August 1943
- Launched: 17 November 1943
- Commissioned: 3 June 1944
- Decommissioned: 17 January 1946
- Stricken: 22 January 1946
- Identification: Pennant number:K665
- Honours and awards: Atlantic, 1944-45.
- Fate: Scuttled for an artificial breakwater at Comox, British Columbia.

General characteristics
- Class & type: River-class frigate
- Displacement: 1,445 long tons (1,468 t; 1,618 short tons); 2,110 long tons (2,140 t; 2,360 short tons) (deep load)
- Length: 283 ft (86.26 m) p/p; 301.25 ft (91.82 m)o/a
- Beam: 36.5 ft (11.13 m)
- Draught: 9 ft (2.74 m); 13 ft (3.96 m) (deep load)
- Propulsion: 2 × Admiralty 3-drum boilers, 2 shafts, reciprocating vertical triple expansion, 5,500 ihp (4,100 kW)
- Speed: 20 knots (37.0 km/h); 20.5 knots (38.0 km/h) (turbine ships)
- Range: 646 long tons (656 t; 724 short tons) oil fuel; 7,500 nautical miles (13,890 km) at 15 knots (27.8 km/h)
- Complement: 157
- Armament: 2 × QF 4 in (102 mm) /45 Mk. XVI on twin mount HA/LA Mk.XIX; 1 × QF 12 pdr (3 in (76 mm)) 12 cwt /40 Mk. V on mounting HA/LA Mk.IX (not all ships); 8 × 20 mm QF Oerlikon A/A on twin mounts Mk.V; 1 × Hedgehog 24 spigot A/S projector; up to 150 depth charges

HMCS Eastview was a River-class frigate that served in the Royal Canadian Navy from 1944-1946. She served as a convoy escort in the Battle of the Atlantic. She was named after the Ottawa suburb of Eastview (now Vanier).

Eastview was ordered in October 1941 as part of the 1942-1943 building program. She was laid down on 26 August 1943 by Canadian Vickers Ltd. at Montreal and launched 17 November 1943. She was commissioned into the RCN at Montreal on 3 June 1944 with the pennant K665.

== Background ==
The River-class frigate was designed by William Reed of Smith's Dock Company of South Bank-on-Tees. Originally called a "twin-screw corvette", its purpose was to improve on the convoy escort classes in service with the Royal Navy at the time, including the Flower-class corvette. The first orders were placed by the Royal Navy in 1940 and the vessels were named for rivers in the United Kingdom, giving name to the class. In Canada they were named for towns and cities though they kept the same designation. The name "frigate" was suggested by Vice-Admiral Percy Nelles of the Royal Canadian Navy and was adopted later that year.

Improvements over the corvette design included improved accommodation which was markedly better. The twin engines gave only three more knots of speed but extended the range of the ship to nearly double that of a corvette at 7,200 nautical miles (13,300 km) at 12 knots. Among other lessons applied to the design was an armament package better designed to combat U-boats including a twin 4-inch mount forward and 12-pounder aft. 15 Canadian frigates were initially fitted with a single 4-inch gun forward but with the exception of HMCS Valleyfield, they were all eventually upgraded to the double mount. For underwater targets, the River-class frigate was equipped with a Hedgehog anti-submarine mortar and depth charge rails aft and four side-mounted throwers.

River-class frigates were the first Royal Canadian Navy warships to carry the 147B Sword horizontal fan echo sonar transmitter in addition to the irregular ASDIC. This allowed the ship to maintain contact with targets even while firing unless a target was struck. Improved radar and direction-finding equipment improved the RCN's ability to find and track enemy submarines over the previous classes.

Canada originally ordered the construction of 33 frigates in October 1941. The design was too big for the shipyards on the Great Lakes so all the frigates built in Canada were built in dockyards along the west coast or along the St. Lawrence River. In all Canada ordered the construction of 60 frigates including ten for the Royal Navy that transferred two to the United States Navy.

== War service ==
Eastview arrived at her homeport of Halifax, Nova Scotia on 26 June 1944 and undertook work up training at Bermuda for one month beginning 19 August 1944. She undertook convoy escort operations in the North Atlantic from Halifax from 18 September 1944 until 28 April 1945. She served as Senior Officer's Ship in the Mid-Ocean Escort Force (MOEF) escort group C-6. She was among the escort for the last HX convoy of the war, the fast convoys that carried supplies from North America to Europe, HX 358.

With victory in Europe seemingly imminent, the RCN deployed Eastview to Esquimalt that summer in preparation for Operation Downfall, the Allied invasion of Japan. Eastview joined the RCN's Pacific Fleet only three weeks before the Surrender of Japan following the atomic bombings of Hiroshima and Nagasaki. During that period she began a tropicalization refit that was cancelled upon the surrender. She was laid up in reserve at Esquimalt following that decision.

Eastview was paid off from the RCN on 17 January 1946. On 22 January the decision was made to dismantle her armaments and scuttle her with several other surplus RCN warships to form a breakwater in Royston, British Columbia later that year. The location of the wreck is located at 49°39′19.88″N 124°56′48.72″W.

== Ship's bell ==
The bell of Eastview was kept during the stripping of the warship before it was sunk. It was given to the city of Eastview in recognition of the support received from the residents. Mayor Gordon Lavergne then gave it to the Eastview Legion where it remains today.

== See also ==
- List of ships of the Canadian Navy
