= Rockaway Beach, Missouri =

- City
- Location of Rockaway Beach, Missouri
- Coordinates: 36°42′07″N 93°09′43″W
- Country: United States
- State: Missouri
- County: Taney

Government
  - Mayor: Jim Harriger

Area
  - Total: 0.76 sq mi (1.97 km^{2})
  - Land: 0.63 sq mi (1.63 km^{2})
  - Water: 0.13 sq mi (0.33 km^{2})
- Elevation: 843 ft (257 m)

Population (2020)
  - Total: 829
  - Density: 1,313/sq mi (507.1/km^{2})
- Time zone: UTC-6 (Central (CST))
  - Summer (DST): UTC-5 (CDT)
- ZIP code: 65740
- Area code: 417
- FIPS code: 29-62570
- GNIS feature ID: 2396404
- Website: www.rockawaybeach-mo.org

Rockaway Beach is a city in Taney County, Missouri, United States. The population was 829 at the 2020 census. It lies on the shoreline of the White River.

Rockaway Beach is part of the Branson, Missouri Micropolitan Statistical Area.

== History ==
Rockaway Beach had its start when a developer bought property on what was speculated to become the shore of Lake Taneycomo. The name most likely is a transfer from Rockaway Beach, New York. A post office called Rockaway Beach has been in operation since 1933.

== Geography ==
Rockaway Beach is located on the north shore of Lake Taneycomo and the White River. Forsyth is approximately three miles to the southeast on Missouri Route 176.

According to the United States Census Bureau, the city has a total area of 0.69 square miles (1.79 km^{2}), of which 0.61 square miles (1.58 km^{2}) is land and 0.08 square miles (0.21 km^{2}) is water.

== Demographics ==
Historical population
Census	Pop.	Note	%±
1960	177		—
1970	195		10.2%
1980	292		49.7%
1990	275		−5.8%
2000	577		109.8%
2010	841		45.8%
2020	829		−1.4%
U.S. Decennial Census

=== 2010 census ===
As of the census of 2010, there were 841 people, 365 households, and 222 families living in the city. The population density was 1,378.7 inhabitants per square mile (532.3/km^{2}). There were 528 housing units at an average density of 865.6 per square mile (334.2/km^{2}). The racial makeup of the city was 96.1% White, 0.7% African American, 1.0% Native American, 0.6% Pacific Islander, 0.4% from other races, and 1.3% from two or more races. Hispanic or Latino of any race were 2.0% of the population.

There were 365 households, of which 23.3% had children under the age of 18 living with them, 44.1% were married couples living together, 11.0% had a female householder with no husband present, 5.8% had a male householder with no wife present, and 39.2% were non-families. 29.9% of all households were made up of individuals, and 8.8% had someone living alone who was 65 years of age or older. The average household size was 2.24 and the average family size was 2.78.

The median age in the city was 45.3 years. 21% of residents were under the age of 18; 6.6% were between the ages of 18 and 24; 22% were from 25 to 44; 32% were from 45 to 64; and 18.4% were 65 years of age or older. The gender makeup of the city was 49.6% male and 50.4% female.

=== 2000 census ===
As of the census of 2000, there were 577 people, 274 households, and 169 families living in the city. The population density was 1,037.1 inhabitants per square mile (400.4/km^{2}). There were 366 housing units at an average density of 657.8 per square mile (254.0/km^{2}). The racial makeup of the city was 96.36% White, 0.17% African American, 0.87% Native American, 0.52% from other races, and 2.08% from two or more races. Hispanic or Latino of any race were 1.56% of the population.

There were 274 households, out of which 22.3% had children under the age of 18 living with them, 53.6% were married couples living together, 5.8% had a female householder with no husband present, and 38.0% were non-families. 31.0% of all households were made up of individuals, and 10.9% had someone living alone who was 65 years of age or older. The average household size was 2.11 and the average family size was 2.64.

In the city the population was spread out, with 18.0% under the age of 18, 4.2% from 18 to 24, 24.1% from 25 to 44, 30.7% from 45 to 64, and 23.1% who were 65 years of age or older. The median age was 47 years. For every 100 females, there were 100.3 males. For every 100 females age 18 and over, there were 93.9 males.

The median income for a household in the city was $33,359, and the median income for a family was $39,063. Males had a median income of $21,375 versus $20,833 for females. The per capita income for the city was $17,589. About 4.8% of families and 8.7% of the population were below the poverty line, including 6.7% of those under age 18 and 9.2% of those age 65 or over.

== Education ==
The school district is Branson R-IV School District..

Branson High School is the comprehensive high school of the Branson district.
