= White River (Arkansas–Missouri) =

River in Arkansas and Missouri, U.S.

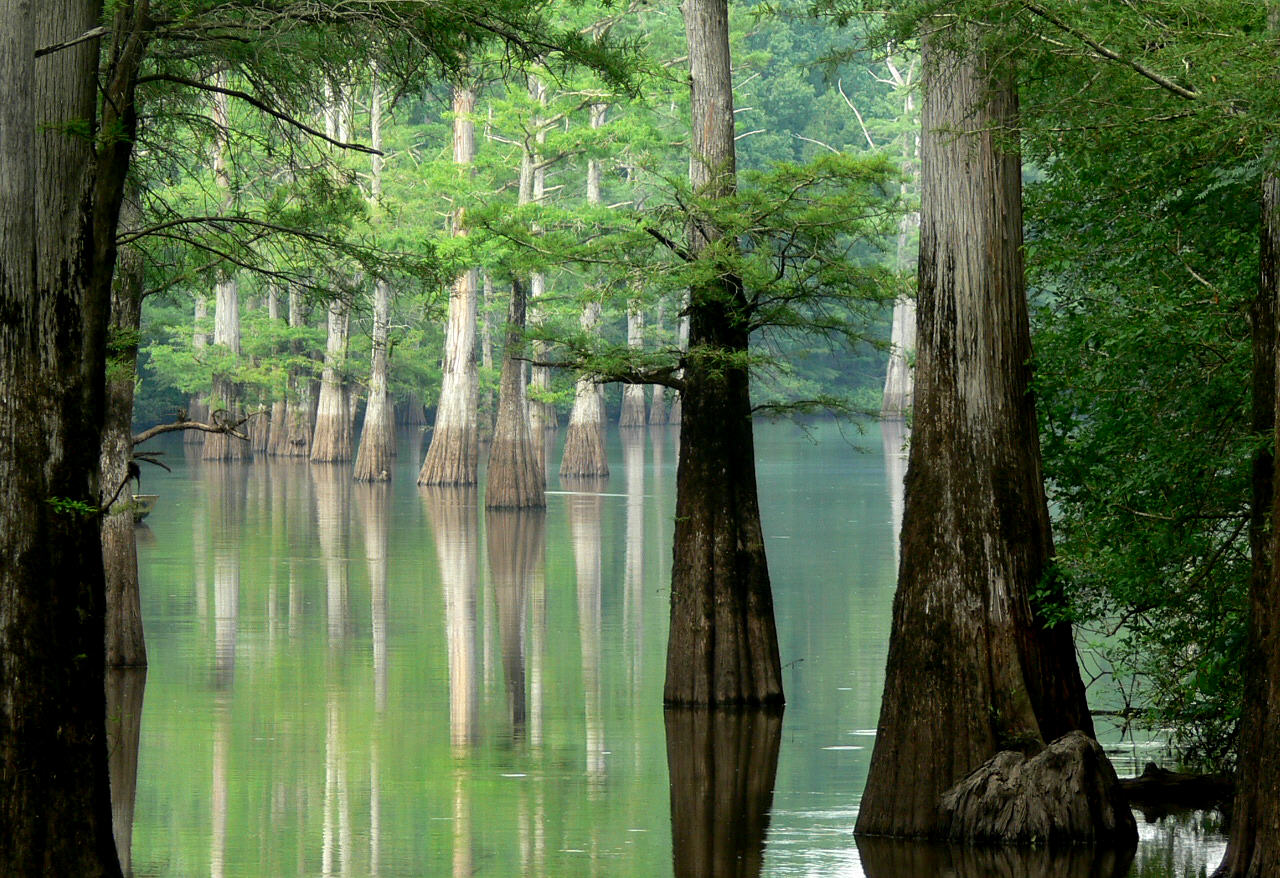
- White River in Arkansas, January 2008

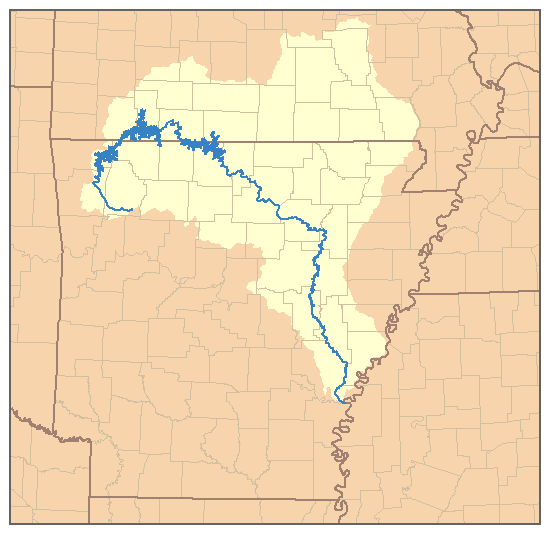
- Map of the White River watershed

Location
- Country: United States
- State: Arkansas, Missouri
- Cities: Newport, Batesville, Fayetteville

Physical characteristics
- Source: Boston Mountains
  - location: Ozark-St. Francis National Forest, Madison County, Arkansas
  - coordinates: 35°50′20″N 93°36′16″W
  - elevation: 2,260 ft (690 m)
- Mouth: Mississippi River
  - location: Desha County, Arkansas
  - coordinates: 33°57′5″N 91°4′53″W
  - elevation: 188 ft (57 m)
- Length: 722 mi (1,162 km)
- Basin size: 27,765 sq mi (71,910 km^{2})
- Discharge
  - location: Devalls Bluff
  - average: 26,180 cu ft/s (741 m^{3}/s)
  - minimum: 3,230 cu ft/s (91 m^{3}/s)
  - maximum: 154,000 cu ft/s (4,400 m^{3}/s)
- Discharge
  - location: Clarendon
  - average: 29,479 cu ft/s (834.8 m^{3}/s)

Basin features
- Landmarks: White River National Wildlife Refuge
- Tributaries
  - left: James River, North Fork River, Black River, Cache River
  - right: Buffalo River, Little Red River, Bayou des Arc
- Waterbodies: Lake Taneycomo, Beaver Lake, Bull Shoals Lake, Table Rock Lake

The White River is a 722-mile (1,162 km) river that flows through the U.S. states of Arkansas and Missouri. Originating in the Boston Mountains of northwest Arkansas, it arcs northwards through southern Missouri before turning back into Arkansas, flowing southeast to its mouth at the Mississippi River.

== Hydrography ==
=== Course ===
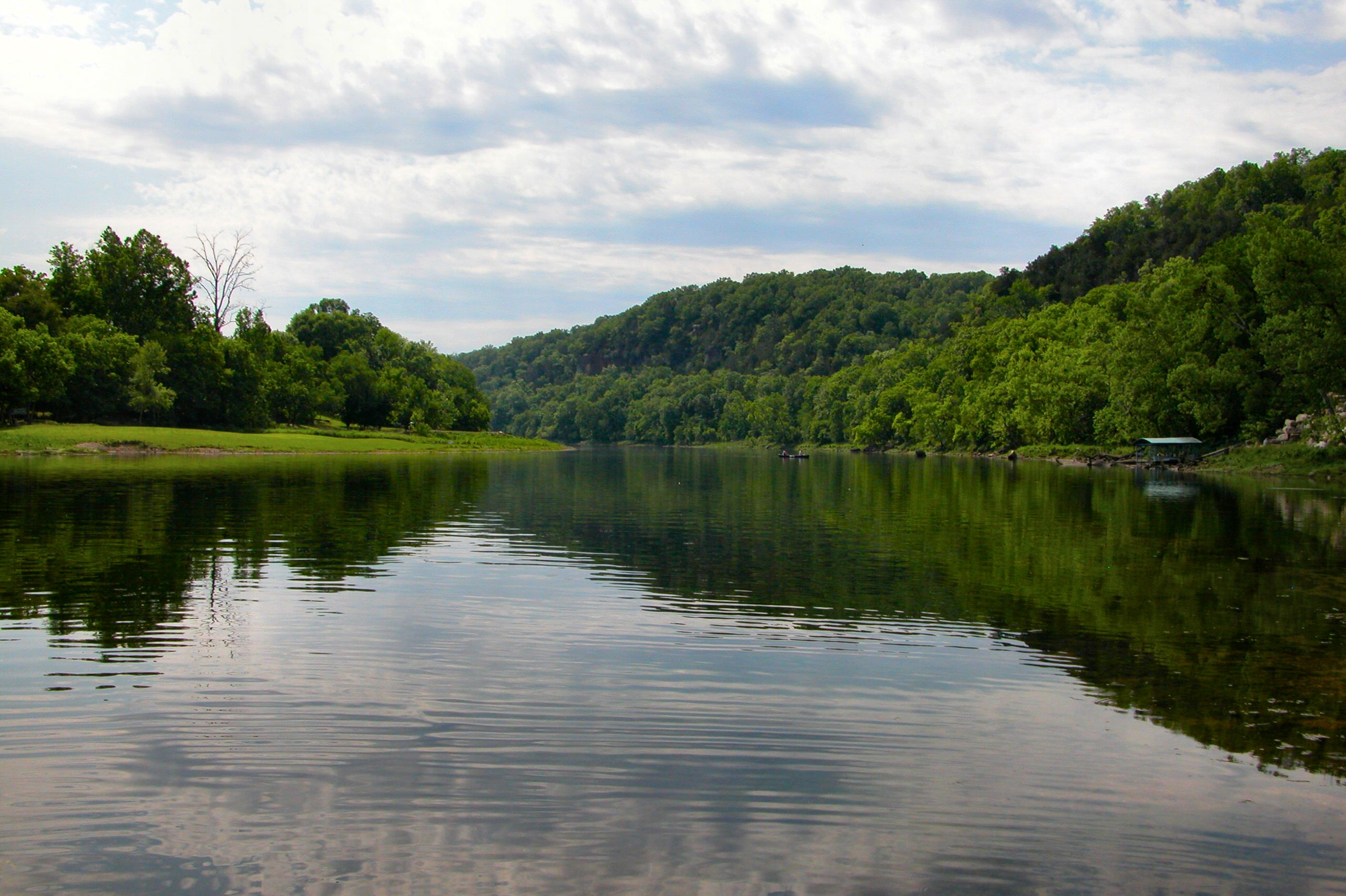
White River near Flippin, Arkansas, May 2006

The source of the White River is in the Boston Mountains of northwest Arkansas, in the Ozark–St. Francis National Forest southeast of Fayetteville. The river flows northwards from its source to loop through southwest Missouri before heading southeast through Arkansas to its mouth on the Mississippi River.

On entering the Mississippi River Valley region near Batesville, Arkansas, the river becomes navigable to shallow-draft vessels, and its speed decreases considerably. The final 10 miles (16 km) serves as the last segment of the McClellan-Kerr Arkansas River Navigation System; this part of the channel is deeper than the rest of the river.

=== Discharge ===
Despite being much shorter than the Arkansas River, it carries nearly as much water—normally more than 20,000 cubic feet per second (570 m^{3}/s), and occasionally more than 100,000 cubic feet per second (2,800 m^{3}/s) during periods of flooding.

=== Flood management and reservoir creation ===
In the 20th century, large sections of the White River were modified via dam construction to form a series of artificial reservoirs for the purpose of flood control, as well as hydroelectric power generation, water distribution and management, and recreation. The first of these encountered from the headwaters is Beaver Lake in northwest Arkansas, followed by Table Rock Lake and Lake Taneycomo in southern Missouri, and finally Bull Shoals Lake as the river loops southward into northern Arkansas. Downstream of Bull Shoals Dam, the White River returns to its natural riparian state as it heads southeast through the eastern Ozark-St. Francis National Forest.

==== Ozark Power and Water Company ====
In 1910, Congress authorized construction of a hydroelectric dam on the White River by the newly formed Ozark Power and Water Company. Completed in 1913 at a cost of $2.3 million, Powersite Dam near Forsyth, Missouri confined a section of the White River to create Lake Taneycomo. The project brought electricity to a rural area of the Ozark Mountains south of Springfield, Missouri with rural electrification programs in the 1940s expanding service to the surrounding region. Recreation on Taneycomo drew tourism to Rockaway Beach and Branson. The Ozark Power and Electric Company operated independently until 1927 when it merged with Empire District Electric Company in 1927, who own and operate Powersite to this day.

==== Army Corps of Engineers ====
Beaver Lake, Bull Shoals Lake, and Table Rock Lake are man-made lakes or reservoirs created by the U.S. Army Corps of Engineers under the authority of the Flood Control Act of 1938.

Bull Shoals Dam near Mountain Home, Arkansas was constructed from 1947 to 1951 at a cost of $86 million and is the 5th largest concrete dam in the United States. It confines Bull Shoals Lake, the largest of the lakes on the White River and the most downstream.

The next to be constructed was Table Rock Dam near Branson, Missouri, completed in 1958 at a cost of $65 million. It confines Table Rock Lake, the second largest on the White and a popular tourist destination as part of the Branson area.

Beaver Dam near Eureka Springs, Arkansas was built between 1960 and 1966 for $46 million. It confines Beaver Lake, the most upstream dam and reservoir on the river.

A total of eight dams impound the upper White River, six in Arkansas and two in Missouri. The White River National Wildlife Refuge lies along the lower part of the river.

=== Major tributaries ===
The tributaries of the White River include Cache River, Bayou des Arc, Little Red River, Black River, North Fork River, Crooked Creek, Buffalo River, Kings River, James River, and Roaring River.

=== Settlements ===
==== Arkansas ====
- Augusta
- Batesville
- Calico Rock
- Newport

==== Missouri ====
- Branson
- Hollister
- Rockaway Beach

== Angling ==
Fishing for trout is popular in the upper portions of the river from the Beaver Lake tailwaters in northwestern Arkansas, through its course through southwest Missouri (including all of Lake Taneycomo), and back down through Arkansas to the Highway 58 bridge in Guion. The river has long been ranked one of the top trout fisheries in the country. Fishing is popular in these waters for a number of trout species including rainbow, brown, and cutthroat trout. A number of trout fishing resorts lie on the tailwaters of Bull Shoals Lake and the North Fork River. Fishing for white bass is also popular in these waters.

== See also ==
- Cotter Bridge
- Grand Prairie Area Demonstration Project
- List of rivers of Arkansas
- List of longest rivers of the United States (by main stem)
- List of rivers of Missouri
- Whitewater Development Corporation
- White River Monster
