= Eastview, Missouri =

Extinct town in Missouri, U.S.

Coordinates: 36°43′50″N 92°46′41″W

Eastview is an extinct town in northeastern Taney County, in the Ozarks of southwest Missouri. The location is along a ridge occupied by Farm Road 147 which is a portion of the scenic Glade Top Trail within the Mark Twain National Forest.

A post office called Eastview was established in 1901, and remained in operation until 1928. The community was so named on account of its lofty elevation.
