= Kirbyville, Missouri =

- Village
- Location of Kirbyville, Missouri
- Coordinates: 36°37′33″N 93°09′20″W
- Country: United States
- State: Missouri
- County: Taney
- Incorporated: June 4, 2001

Area
  - Total: 1.40 sq mi (3.63 km^{2})
  - Land: 1.40 sq mi (3.63 km^{2})
  - Water: 0 sq mi (0.00 km^{2})
- Elevation: 965 ft (294 m)

Population (2020)
  - Total: 195
  - Density: 139.0/sq mi (53.66/km^{2})
- Time zone: UTC-6 (Central (CST))
  - Summer (DST): UTC-5 (CDT)
- ZIP code: 65679
- Area code: 417
- FIPS code: 29-39008
- GNIS feature ID=: 2398359

Kirbyville is a village in Taney County, Missouri, United States. The population was 195 at the 2020 census. It is part of the Branson, Missouri Micropolitan Statistical Area.

== History ==
A post office called Kirbyville has been in operation since 1871. One Mr. Kirby, an early postmaster, gave the community his last name.

The Snap Balds where the Bald Knobbers were organized in 1883 are located just to the northwest of the village.

Kirbyville incorporated on June 4, 2001.

== Geography ==
Kirbyville is located approximately seven miles east of Branson on Route 76 at the intersection of Route 76 and Missouri Route J. The farming and residential community is part of the Branson Micropolitan Statistical Area. Kirbyville's has the ZIP code 65679.

According to the United States Census Bureau, the village has a total area of 1.34 square miles (3.47 km^{2}), all land.

== Demographics ==
Historical population
Census	Pop.	Note	%±
2010	207		—
2020	195		−5.8%
U.S. Decennial Census

=== 2010 census ===
As of the census of 2010, there were 207 people, 77 households, and 54 families residing in the village. The population density was 155.1 inhabitants per square mile (59.9/km^{2}). There were 87 housing units at an average density of 65.2 units per square mile (25.2 units/km^{2}). The racial makeup of the village was 88.4% White, 0.5% African American, 2.4% Asian, 7.2% from other races, and 1.4% from two or more races. Hispanic or Latino of any race were 6.8% of the population.

There were 77 households, of which 29.9% had children under the age of 18 living with them, 53.2% were married couples living together, 13.0% had a female householder with no husband present, 3.9% had a male householder with no wife present, and 29.9% were non-families. 27.3% of all households were made up of individuals, and 15.6% had someone living alone who was 65 years of age or older. The average household size was 2.69 and the average family size was 3.28.

The median age in the village was 38.8 years. 28.0% of residents were under the age of 18; 8.7% were between the ages of 18 and 24; 20.8% were from 25 to 44; 30.9% were from 45 to 64; and 11.6% were 65 years of age or older. The gender makeup of the village was 49.8% male and 50.2% female.

== Education ==
It is in the Kirbyville R-VI School District, an elementary school district. This district operates Kirbyville Elementary (pre-school to 3rd grade) and Kirbyville Middle School (4th to 8th grade).

Students in the district may attend one of the following: Branson High School (of Branson Public Schools), Forsyth High School, and Hollister High School (of Hollister R-V School District).

Trinity Christian Academy is in the area.

College of the Ozarks is in the area.
