= Garber, Missouri =

Unincorporated community in Missouri, U.S.

Coordinates: 36°41′30″N 93°17′57″W

Garber is an unincorporated community in western Taney County in the Ozarks of southern Missouri. Garber is located along the Missouri Pacific Railroad line and Roark Creek, approximately four miles northwest of Branson.

== History ==
A post office called Garber was established in 1895, and remained in operation until 1956. The community once contained the Garber schoolhouse, now defunct, but still standing.
