= East View Geospatial =

East View Geospatial (EVG), formerly East View Cartographic (EVC), is a provider of worldwide maps, geospatial data and geographic information systems (GIS) services. EVG's holdings include all types of geospatial data including vector & raster data, digital elevation models (DEM), satellite & aerial imagery, topographic maps, nautical & aeronautical charts, geological maps, bathymetric data and atlases.

EVG has a history serving Energy & Natural Resource, Avionics, and Telecom companies, Defense and Intelligence contractors, Land Use & Engineering firms, Humanitarian organizations and Academic institutions.

EVG is headquartered in Minneapolis, Minnesota.

== East View Geospatial Jottings ==
EVG has played a role in gaining access to and then marketing original geospatial information from China and Russia, pertaining in particular to Asia, South America, and Africa, areas of the world for which the United States of America does not have tactical maps at the 1:50,000 or better level, with contour lines.

In 2003, East View Cartographic formed a partnership with Environmental Systems Research Institute (ESRI) to provide data sets for ESRI's Mapshop web application.

In 2006, East View acquired perhaps the first comprehensive private collection of worldwide geologic maps from the Telberg Geologic Map Service.

In 2010, East View acquired the map assets and domain name of Map Link.

In 2012, East View Cartographic changed its name to East View Geospatial.
