= Hollister, Missouri =

- City
- Location within Taney County and Missouri
- Coordinates: 36°36′23″N 93°13′57″W
- Country: United States
- State: Missouri
- County: Taney

Government
  - Mayor: Jeff Long

Area
  - Total: 6.37 sq mi (16.49 km^{2})
  - Land: 6.34 sq mi (16.41 km^{2})
  - Water: 0.031 sq mi (0.08 km^{2})
- Elevation: 955 ft (291 m)

Population (2020)
  - Total: 4,583
  - Density: 723.5/sq mi (279.36/km^{2})
- Time zone: UTC-6 (Central (CST))
  - Summer (DST): UTC-5 (CDT)
- ZIP codes: 65672-65673
- Area code: 417
- FIPS code: 29-32662
- GNIS ID: 2394404
- Website: www.hollistermo.gov

Hollister is a city in Taney County, Missouri, United States. The population was 4,583 at the 2020 census.

== History ==
Melinda Fortner settled in Hollister in the early 1880s, after establishing a claim on a 120-acre (49 ha) tract of land in 1867. Reuben Kirkham opened a general store and applied for a post office, suggesting the name Hollister after his daughter, born in Hollister, California. A post office called Hollister has been in operation since 1904.

The Downing Street Historic District was listed on the National Register of Historic Places in 1978.

== Geography ==
According to the United States Census Bureau, the city has a total area of 6.84 square miles (17.72 km^{2}), of which 6.68 square miles (17.30 km^{2}) is land and 0.16 square miles (0.41 km^{2}) is water.

Branson Airport is the nearest airport to Hollister.

== Demographics ==
Historical population
Census	Pop.	Note	%±
1910	111		—
1920	309		178.4%
1930	419		35.6%
1940	370		−11.7%
1950	542		46.5%
1960	600		10.7%
1970	906		51.0%
1980	1,439		58.8%
1990	2,628		82.6%
2000	3,867		47.1%
2010	4,426		14.5%
2020	4,583		3.5%
U.S. Decennial Census

Hollister is part of the Branson, Missouri Micropolitan Statistical Area.

=== 2020 census ===
As of the 2020 census, Hollister had a population of 4,583. The median age was 37.6 years. 21.5% of residents were under the age of 18 and 17.8% of residents were 65 years of age or older. For every 100 females there were 93.0 males, and for every 100 females age 18 and over there were 92.0 males age 18 and over.

93.9% of residents lived in urban areas, while 6.1% lived in rural areas.

There were 1,948 households in Hollister, of which 28.3% had children under the age of 18 living in them. Of all households, 37.8% were married-couple households, 21.7% were households with a male householder and no spouse or partner present, and 30.6% were households with a female householder and no spouse or partner present. About 33.6% of all households were made up of individuals and 11.5% had someone living alone who was 65 years of age or older.

There were 2,198 housing units, of which 11.4% were vacant. The homeowner vacancy rate was 1.7% and the rental vacancy rate was 8.7%.

Racial composition as of the 2020 census
Race	Number	Percent
White	3,784	82.6%
Black or African American	67	1.5%
American Indian and Alaska Native	38	0.8%
Asian	35	0.8%
Native Hawaiian and Other Pacific Islander	16	0.3%
Some other race	139	3.0%
Two or more races	504	11.0%
Hispanic or Latino (of any race)	432	9.4%

=== 2010 census ===
As of the census of 2010, there were 4,426 people, 1,847 households, and 1,129 families living in the city. The population density was 662.6 inhabitants per square mile (255.8/km^{2}). There were 2,199 housing units at an average density of 329.2 per square mile (127.1/km^{2}). The racial makeup of the city was 92.5% White, 0.9% African American, 1.2% Native American, 0.5% Asian, 0.2% Pacific Islander, 2.8% from other races, and 1.9% from two or more races. Hispanic or Latino of any race were 6.4% of the population.

There were 1,847 households, of which 30.6% had children under the age of 18 living with them, 41.3% were married couples living together, 14.4% had a female householder with no husband present, 5.5% had a male householder with no wife present, and 38.9% were non-families. 30.2% of all households were made up of individuals, and 10.2% had someone living alone who was 65 years of age or older. The average household size was 2.34 and the average family size was 2.90.

The median age in the city was 36.6 years. 23.2% of residents were under the age of 18; 10.1% were between the ages of 18 and 24; 26.6% were from 25 to 44; 23.7% were from 45 to 64; and 16.3% were 65 years of age or older. The gender makeup of the city was 48.2% male and 51.8% female.

=== 2000 census ===
As of the census of 2000, there were 3,867 people, 1,682 households, and 1,005 families living in the city. The population density was 1,039.0 inhabitants per square mile (401.2/km^{2}). There were 1,931 housing units at an average density of 518.8 per square mile (200.3/km^{2}). The racial makeup of the city was 96.53% White, 0.21% African American, 1.14% Native American, 0.16% Asian, 0.16% Pacific Islander, 0.78% from other races, and 1.03% from two or more races. Hispanic or Latino of any race were 3.08% of the population.

There were 1,682 households, out of which 27.1% had children under the age of 18 living with them, 42.5% were married couples living together, 13.2% had a female householder with no husband present, and 40.2% were non-families. 31.8% of all households were made up of individuals, and 9.5% had someone living alone who was 65 years of age or older. The average household size was 2.23 and the average family size was 2.79.

In the city the population was spread out, with 22.6% under the age of 18, 12.5% from 18 to 24, 29.1% from 25 to 44, 19.4% from 45 to 64, and 16.3% who were 65 years of age or older. The median age was 35 years. For every 100 females, there were 88.3 males. For every 100 females age 18 and over, there were 82.4 males.

The median income for a household in the city was $24,535, and the median income for a family was $30,433. Males had a median income of $20,748 versus $18,274 for females. The per capita income for the city was $12,716. About 10.6% of families and 13.2% of the population were below the poverty line, including 17.6% of those under age 18 and 7.8% of those age 65 or over.

== Transportation ==
Intercity bus service to the city is provided by Jefferson Lines.

== Notable people ==
- Phil Gagliano, professional baseball player.
- Gale Wade, professional baseball player.
- Melody Patterson, actress.
