= Lake Taneycomo =

- Location within Missouri Location within the United States
- Location: Taney County, Missouri
- Coordinates: 36°41′42″N 93°09′54″W
- Type: reservoir
- Primary inflows: White River
- Primary outflows: White River
- Basin countries: United States
- Surface elevation: 702 ft (214 m)

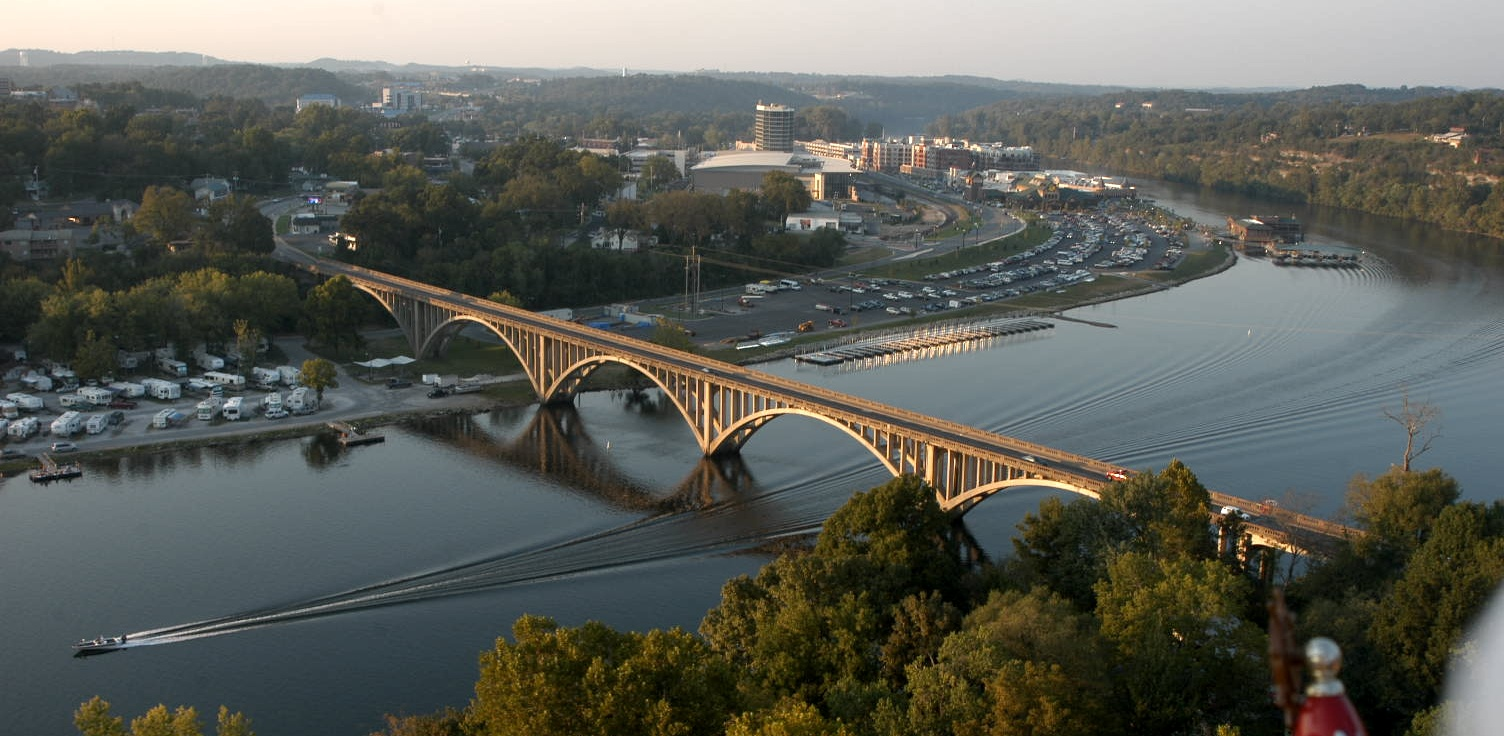
The Bridge over Lake Taneycomo between Branson and Hollister, Missouri with Branson Landing and the Branson Convention Center in the background

Lake Taneycomo is a man-made lake or reservoir on the White River in the Ozark Mountains of Taney County, Missouri. The reservoir's name is a portmanteau for the county and state in which it is located: Taney County, MO.

Lake Taneycomo originated when the White River was confined by the completion of the Powersite Dam, near Forsyth, Missouri, in 1913. From 1913 until 1958 it was a warm water lake. In the 1920s and 1930s, tourists began to be drawn to the lake and its nearby communities, Branson and Rockaway Beach. Water skiing, boating, fishing, sunning and swimming drew folks to the warm waters of Lake Taneycomo. Restaurants, lodging and amusement attractions such as bumper cars and skee ball were plentiful in the towns along the lake.

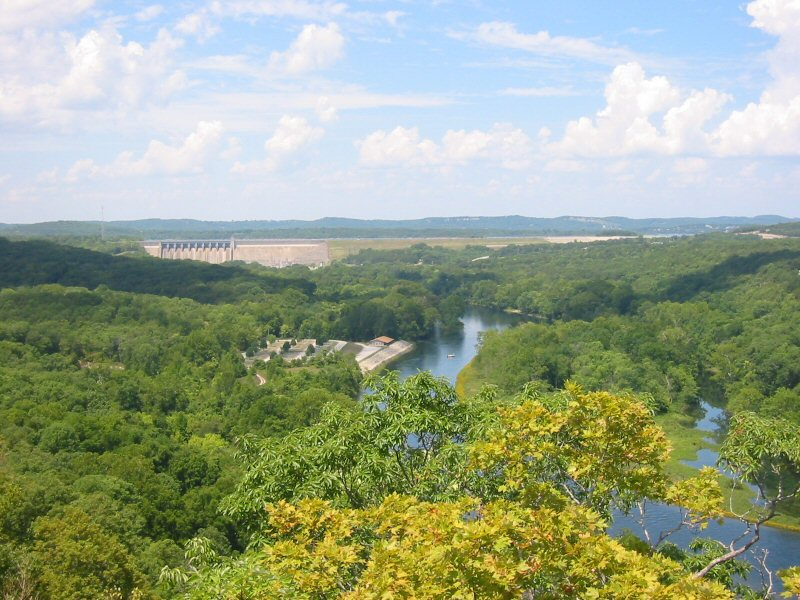
Lake Taneycomo as seen from an observation point on Route 165. The dam in the background impounds Table Rock Lake.

The completion of Table Rock Dam in 1958 changed the source of water to Taneycomo from that of the White River's flowing waters to the bottom tailwater of Table Rock Lake from the dam spillway and made it into a cold water lake. The clear cold waters from the deep tailwaters of Table Rock Lake pour out of the dam into Lake Taneycomo. The cold water made swimming and water sports undesirable. Tourism declined sharply in Rockaway Beach and started shifting to Branson and Table Rock Lake.

Although tourism declined, fishermen found that the chilly water of Lake Taneycomo made it one of the top trout fishing lakes in the country. In 1957, the Missouri Department of Conservation constructed the Shepherd of the Hills Trout Hatchery. All methods of trout fishing — fly fishing, artificial bait, and live bait fishing — may be used year-round to pursue trout that inhabit the waters of Lake Taneycomo.

Lake Taneycomo has the characteristics of both a river and a lake. The shallow colder water, located near the Table Rock Dam, averages 48 °F (9 °C), resembles a river and permits wading and bank fishing for trout. The average temperature of the water gets warmer and the depth of the lake deepens to more than 50 feet (15 m) near the Powersite Dam in Forsyth. When Table Rock Dam is generating power its current is very strong throughout its whole length, its water temperature drops, and for all practical purposes it becomes a very deep, cold, fast running river. Exactly how deep, cold, and fast depends on how many generators are being used to generate electricity at Table Rock Dam.

Lake Taneycomo offers a variety of recreational activities including hiking, sightseeing, hunting, fishing, swimming, boating, kayaking, and water skiing. People accessing Lake Taneycomo are able to visit area restaurants, accommodations, shopping, and shows in the Branson area.
