= Bradleyville, Missouri =

Unincorporated community in Missouri, U.S.

- Unincorporated community
- Location of Bradleyville, Missouri
- Coordinates: 36°47′01″N 92°54′30″W
- Country: United States
- State: Missouri
- County: Taney
- Reincorporated: October 20, 2002
- Disincorporated: October 17, 2009
- Elevation: 853 ft (260 m)

Population
  - Total: 80
- Time zone: UTC-6 (Central (CST))
  - Summer (DST): UTC-5 (CDT)
- ZIP code: 65614
- Area code: 417
- GNIS feature ID: 0748992

Bradleyville is an Unincorporated community in northeastern Taney County, Missouri, United States. It is located at the intersection of Route 76 and Route 125 above the west bank of Beaver Creek. Bradleyville is part of the Branson, Missouri Micropolitan Statistical Area.

== History ==
A post office called Bradleyville has been in operation since 1861. The community has the name of the local Bradley family. The community was listed on the Census Bureau as incorporated from 1920 to 1970. Bradleyville reincorporated in 2002. The village disincorporated in 2009.

== Demographics ==
Historical population
Census	Pop.	Note	%±
1920	56		—
1930	41		−26.8%
1940	60		46.3%
1950	69		15.0%
1960	91		31.9%
1970	92		1.1%
