= Taney County, Missouri =

County in Missouri, United States

- County
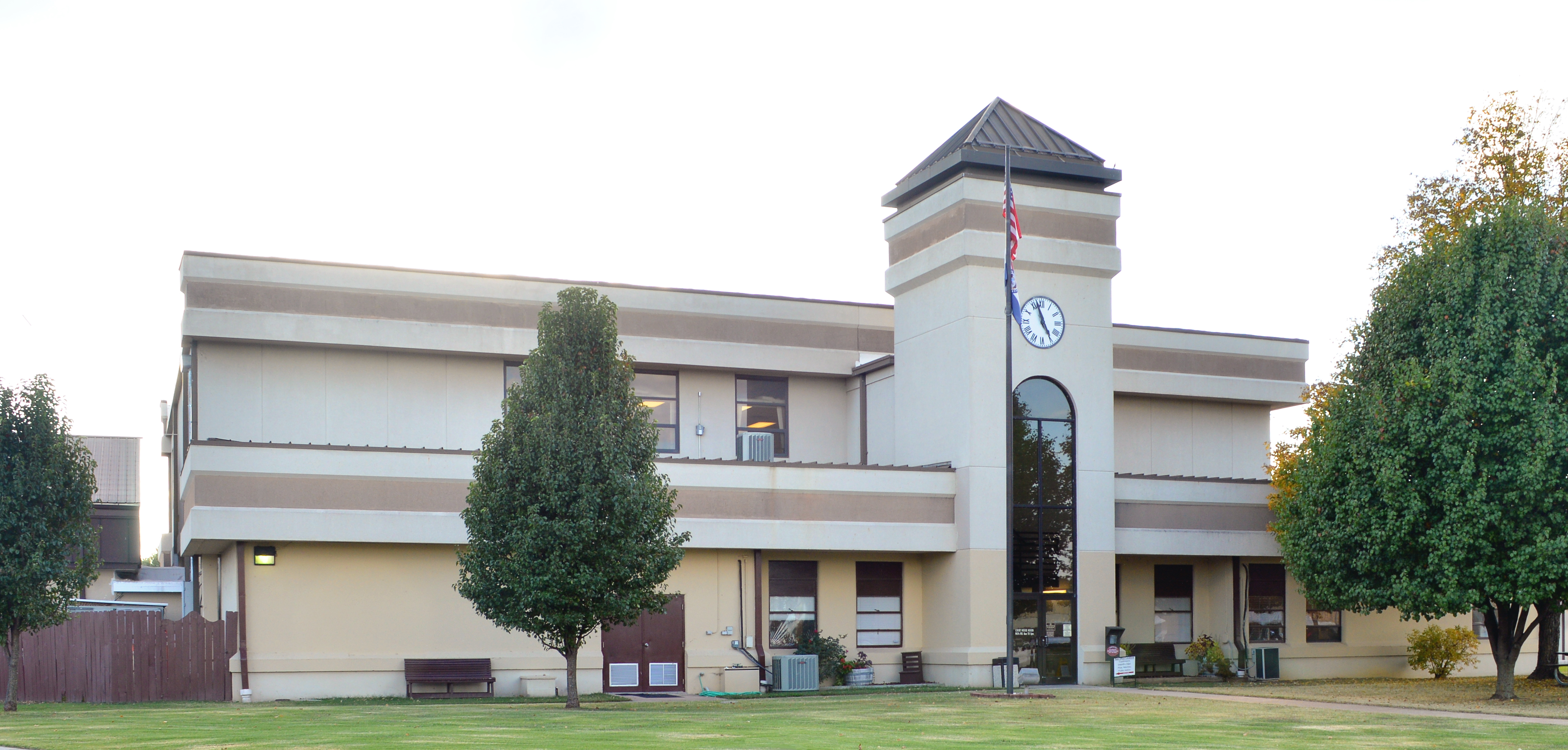
- The Taney County Courthouse in Forsyth

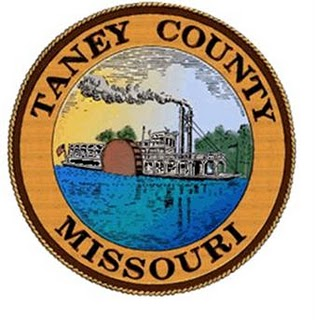
- Seal

- Location within the U.S. state of Missouri
- Coordinates: 36°39′N 93°02′W
- Country: United States
- State: Missouri
- Founded: January 4, 1837
- Named for: Roger B. Taney
- Seat: Forsyth
- Largest city: Branson

Area
  - Total: 652 sq mi (1,690 km^{2})
  - Land: 632 sq mi (1,640 km^{2})
  - Water: 19 sq mi (49 km^{2}) 2.9%

Population (2020)
  - Total: 56,066
  - Estimate (2025): 57,001 ▲
  - Density: 88.7/sq mi (34.3/km^{2})
- Time zone: UTC−6 (Central)
  - Summer (DST): UTC−5 (CDT)
- Congressional district: 7th
- Website: www.taneycounty.org

Taney County is a county in the southwestern portion of the U.S. state of Missouri. As of the 2020 census, the population was 56,066. Its county seat is Forsyth. It is coterminus with the Branson micropolitan area. For the 2000 and 2010 censuses, the Branson micropolitan area was defined to also include Stone County, but the county was removed in the OMB statistical definitions released in 2023.

Taney County was officially organized on January 4, 1837, and named in honor of Roger Brooke Taney, the fifth Chief Justice of the U.S. Supreme Court, best known for delivering the infamous majority opinion in Dred Scott v. Sandford. However, unlike Roger B. Taney, who pronounced his name /ˈtɔːni/, the "Taney" in Taney County is generally pronounced /ˈteɪni/.

The county includes the popular tourist destinations Branson and Table Rock, Taneycomo and Bull Shoals lakes.

== History ==
The first Taney County Courthouse was built on the mouth of Bull Creek at the confluence of the White River by early pioneers in 1837. Its use as a courthouse ended after Forsyth became the county seat; it was destroyed in a tornado in 1963.

The county's second courthouse, in Forsyth, was destroyed in a Civil War battle on July 22, 1861. The rebuilt courthouse was destroyed by fire on December 19, 1885. A third courthouse was removed in 1952 to permit the building of Bull Shoals Lake. The fourth, and present, courthouse was occupied on August 1, 1952. An addition was completed in 1991 after two years of construction.

=== Bald Knobbers ===
In the years following the Civil War, Taney County experienced ongoing violence and weak official authority. In response, a group of 13 local men led by Union veteran Nat Kinney formed a vigilante organization known as the Bald Knobbers on April 5, 1885, near Kirbyville, Missouri. The group took its name from their meeting location on a treeless hilltop known as Snapp's Bald.

The Bald Knobbers were organized not to uphold equal justice, but to impose their own strict and often violent values on the community. Claiming to oppose crime, they often targeted individuals who simply did not conform to their moral or political views. As their influence grew, their actions became more extreme—ranging from intimidation and public beatings to acts of deadly violence.

The group’s tactics soon provoked backlash. Opposing factions, sometimes called the Anti-Bald Knobbers, formed in resistance. Tensions escalated into deadly confrontations, including the assassination of Kinney in 1888 and the 1889 public execution of several Bald Knobbers who had committed murder.

The Bald Knobbers left a controversial legacy, seen remembered by many as enforcers of fear who used violence to shape society according to their own ideals. Their story inspired literature and folklore, including Harold Bell Wright’s novel The Shepherd of the Hills and local Ozarks tourism attractions.

In 1904, the White River Railway was extended through the rugged terrain of Stone and Taney counties. By then, both counties had for years had a sundown town policy, forbidding African Americans to live there.

In 2008, a New Taney County Judicial Center was built. That Judicial Center houses the courtrooms, the Circuit Clerk, and the County Jail.

== Geography ==
According to the U.S. Census Bureau, the county has a total area of 652 square miles (1,690 km^{2}), of which 632 square miles (1,640 km^{2}) is land and 19 square miles (49 km^{2}) (2.9%) is water.

The county is drained by White River and its affluents.

=== Adjacent counties ===
- Christian County (north)
- Douglas County (northeast)
- Ozark County (east)
- Marion County, Arkansas (southeast)
- Boone County, Arkansas (south)
- Carroll County, Arkansas (southwest)
- Stone County (west)

=== Major highways ===
- US 65
- US 160
- Route 76
- Route 86
- Route 125
- Route 176
- Route 248
- Route 265
- Route 376

=== Transit ===
- Jefferson Lines

=== National protected area ===
- Mark Twain National Forest (part)

== Demographics ==
Historical population
| Census | Pop. | Note | %± |
|---|---|---|---|
| 1840 | 3,264 | | — |
| 1850 | 4,373 | | 34.0% |
| 1860 | 3,576 | | −18.2% |
| 1870 | 4,347 | | 21.6% |
| 1880 | 5,599 | | 28.8% |
| 1890 | 7,973 | | 42.4% |
| 1900 | 10,812 | | 35.6% |
| 1910 | 9,287 | | −14.1% |
| 1920 | 8,878 | | −4.4% |
| 1930 | 8,867 | | −0.1% |
| 1940 | 10,323 | | 16.4% |
| 1950 | 9,863 | | −4.5% |
| 1960 | 10,238 | | 3.8% |
| 1970 | 13,023 | | 27.2% |
| 1980 | 20,467 | | 57.2% |
| 1990 | 25,561 | | 24.9% |
| 2000 | 39,703 | | 55.3% |
| 2010 | 51,675 | | 30.2% |
| 2020 | 56,066 | | 8.5% |
| 2025 (est.) | 57,001 | ▲ | 1.7% |
U.S. Decennial Census; 1790-1960 1900-1990; 1990-2000 2010-2015

=== Racial and ethnic composition ===
Taney County, Missouri – Racial and ethnic composition Note: the US Census treats Hispanic/Latino as an ethnic category. This table excludes Latinos from the racial categories and assigns them to a separate category. Hispanics/Latinos may be of any race.
| Race / Ethnicity (NH = Non-Hispanic) | Pop 1980 | Pop 1990 | Pop 2000 | Pop 2010 | Pop 2020 | % 1980 | % 1990 | % 2000 | % 2010 | % 2020 |
|---|---|---|---|---|---|---|---|---|---|---|
| White alone (NH) | 20,195 | 25,119 | 37,651 | 47,083 | 46,468 | 98.67% | 98.27% | 94.83% | 91.11% | 82.88% |
| Black or African American alone (NH) | 28 | 16 | 129 | 405 | 837 | 0.14% | 0.06% | 0.32% | 0.78% | 1.49% |
| Native American or Alaska Native alone (NH) | 99 | 147 | 309 | 376 | 407 | 0.48% | 0.58% | 0.78% | 0.73% | 0.73% |
| Asian alone (NH) | 32 | 81 | 136 | 329 | 608 | 0.16% | 0.32% | 0.34% | 0.64% | 1.08% |
| Native Hawaiian or Pacific Islander alone (NH) | x | x | 21 | 40 | 187 | x | x | 0.05% | 0.08% | 0.33% |
| Other race alone (NH) | 16 | 4 | 22 | 53 | 182 | 0.08% | 0.02% | 0.06% | 0.10% | 0.32% |
| Mixed race or Multiracial (NH) | x | x | 473 | 895 | 3,048 | x | x | 1.19% | 1.73% | 5.44% |
| Hispanic or Latino (any race) | 97 | 194 | 962 | 2,494 | 4,329 | 0.47% | 0.76% | 2.42% | 4.83% | 7.72% |
| Total | 20,467 | 25,561 | 39,703 | 51,675 | 56,066 | 100.00% | 100.00% | 100.00% | 100.00% | 100.00% |

=== 2020 census ===
As of the 2020 census, the county had a population of 56,066, and the median age was 42.3 years; 20.3% of residents were under the age of 18 while 22.0% were 65 years of age or older.

For every 100 females there were 96.5 males, and for every 100 females age 18 and over there were 94.2 males.

62.8% of residents lived in urban areas, while 37.2% lived in rural areas.

There were 22,486 households in the county, of which 26.2% had children under the age of 18 living with them and 26.1% had a female householder with no spouse or partner present. About 28.6% of all households were made up of individuals and 13.3% had someone living alone who was 65 years of age or older.

There were 29,391 housing units, of which 23.5% were vacant. Among occupied housing units, 62.8% were owner-occupied and 37.2% were renter-occupied. The homeowner vacancy rate was 2.9% and the rental vacancy rate was 13.3%. The race alone makeup (including Hispanics in the various racial categories) of the county was 85.1% White, 1.5% Black or African American, 0.9% American Indian and Alaska Native, 1.1% Asian, 0.4% Native Hawaiian and Pacific Islander, 3.4% from some other race, and 7.6% from two or more races, with Hispanic or Latino residents of any race comprising 7.7% of the population. Detailed counts and percentages appear below.

Taney County Racial Composition
| Race | Num. | Perc. |
|---|---|---|
| White (NH) | 46,468 | 83% |
| Black or African American (NH) | 837 | 1.5% |
| Native American (NH) | 407 | 0.73% |
| Asian (NH) | 608 | 1.1% |
| Pacific Islander (NH) | 187 | 0.33% |
| Other/Mixed (NH) | 3,230 | 5.76% |
| Hispanic or Latino | 4,239 | 7.56% |

=== 2000 census ===
As of the census of 2000, there were 39,703 people, 16,158 households, and 11,052 families residing in the county. The population density was 24/km^{2} (62/mi^{2}). There were 19,688 housing units at an average density of 12/km^{2} (31/mi^{2}). The racial makeup of the county was 96.22% White, 0.35% Black or African American, 0.87% Native American, 0.34% Asian, 0.05% Pacific Islander, 0.74% from other races, and 1.42% from two or more races. About 2.42% of the population were Hispanic or Latino of any race. Among the major first ancestries reported in Taney County were 20.8% German, 18.9% American, 12.4% Irish, and 12.3% English.

There were 16,158 households, out of which 27.80% had children under the age of 18 living with them, 56.60% were married couples living together, 8.60% had a female householder with no husband present, and 31.60% were non-families. 25.70% of all households were made up of individuals, and 10.00% had someone living alone who was 65 years of age or older. The average household size was 2.37 and the average family size was 2.83.

In the county, the population was spread out, with 22.40% under the age of 18, 10.20% from 18 to 24, 26.20% from 25 to 44, 25.00% from 45 to 64, and 16.20% who were 65 years of age or older. The median age was 39 years. For every 100 females, there were 94.00 males. For every 100 females age 18 and over, there were 90.40 males.

The median income for a household in the county was $39,771, and the median income for a family was $47,664. Males had a median income of $25,431 versus $19,655 for females. The per capita income for the county was $21,663. About 9.40% of families and 12.40% of the population were below the poverty line, including 17.60% of those under age 18 and 8.80% of those age 65 or over.

=== Religion ===
According to the Association of Religion Data Archives County Membership Report (2000), Taney County is a part of the Bible Belt with evangelical Protestantism being the majority religion. The most predominant denominations among residents in Taney County who adhere to a religion are Southern Baptists (32.88%), Roman Catholics (12.36%), and Presbyterians (9.13%).

== Public safety ==
The Taney County Ambulance District (TCAD) is an emergency medical services (EMS) agency providing exclusive ambulance transport for Taney County, Missouri. TCAD was established by public vote in 1971.

The Taney County Sheriff's Office and its jail are in Forsyth, which also has a police department.

Firefighting services are provided by Central Taney County Fire Protection District and Western Taney County Fire Protection District.

== Education ==
Of adults 25 years of age and older in Taney County, 81.4% possess a high school diploma or higher while 14.9% hold a bachelor's degree or higher as their highest educational attainment.

K-12 school districts, including those based in other counties with portions of Taney County, include:

- Bradleyville R-I School District
- Branson Public Schools
- Forsyth R-III School District
- Galena R-II School District
- Hollister R-V School District
- Spokane R-VII School District

Elementary school districts include:

- Kirbyville R-VI School District
- Mark Twain R-VIII School District
- Taneyville R-II School District

=== Colleges and universities ===
- Ozarks Technical Community College, Hollister
- College of the Ozarks, Point Lookout

=== Public schools ===
- Bradleyville R-I School District - Bradleyville
  - Bradleyville Elementary School (PK-06)
  - Bradleyville High School (07-12)
- Branson Public Schools - Branson
  - Branson Primary School (PK)
  - Branson Buchanan Elementary (K-04)
  - Branson Cedar Ridge Elementary (K-04)
  - Branson Buchanan Intermediate (04-06)
  - Branson Cedar Ridge Intermediate (04-06)
  - Branson Jr. High School (07-08)
  - Branson High School (09-12)
- Forsyth R-III School District - Forsyth
  - Forsyth Elementary School (K-04)
  - Forsyth Middle School (05-08)
  - Forsyth High School (09-12)
- Hollister R-V School District - Hollister
  - Hollister Elementary School (PK-04)
  - Hollister Middle School (05-06)
- Riedgedale Elementary School
  - Hollister Jr. High School (07-08)
  - Hollister High School (09-12)
- Kirbyville R-VI School District - Kirbyville
  - Kirbyville Elementary School (K-03)
  - Kirbyville Middle School (04-08)
- Mark Twain R-VIII School District - Rueter
  - Mark Twain Elementary School (K-08)
- Taneyville R-II School District - Taneyville
  - Taneyville Elementary School (K-08)

=== Private schools ===
- Link Academy - Scott Township outside of Branson
- Trinity Christian Academy - Hollister - (PK-12) - Non-denominational Christian
- Riverview Bible Baptist Church School - Forsyth - (05-08) - Baptist
- School of the Ozarks - Point Lookout

=== Alternative and vocational schools ===
- Delmina Woods Youth Facility - Forsyth - (06-12) - Alternative/Other School

=== Public libraries ===
- Forsyth Public Library
- Library Center of the Ozarks

== Politics ==
=== Local ===
Taney County, Missouri

Elected countywide officials
| Assessor | David Wilson | Republican |
| Auditor | David Clark | Republican |
| Circuit Clerk | Amy Strahan | Republican |
| County Clerk | Stephanie Spencer | Republican |
| Collector | Mona Cope | Republican |
| Commissioner (presiding) | Nick Plummer | Republican |
| Commissioner (eastern district) | Shane Keys | Republican |
| Commissioner (western district) | Brandon Williams | Republican |
| Coroner | Tony Mullen | Republican |
| Prosecuting Attorney | Brad Hughes | Republican |
| Public Administrator | Joanna Jasper | Republican |
| Recorder | Jody Stahl | Republican |
| Sheriff | Brad Daniels | Republican |
| Treasurer | Melanie Smith | Republican |

As of 2020, the Republican Party completely controls politics at the local level in Taney County. Republicans hold every elected position in the county.

=== State ===
Past Gubernatorial Elections Results
| Year | Republican | Democratic | Third Parties |
|---|---|---|---|
| 2024 | 78.09% 20,622 | 19.65% 5,189 | 2.26% 597 |
| 2020 | 77.32% 20,221 | 20.35% 5,323 | 2.33% 609 |
| 2016 | 71.03% 16,579 | 25.67% 5,992 | 3.30% 770 |
| 2012 | 59.56% 12,761 | 37.67% 8,071 | 2.77% 593 |
| 2008 | 51.16% 10,903 | 46.31% 9,870 | 2.53% 540 |
| 2004 | 68.88% 13,207 | 29.91% 5,734 | 1.21% 233 |
| 2000 | 60.03% 9,003 | 37.30% 5,594 | 2.67% 400 |
| 1996 | 58.07% 7,516 | 38.89% 5,034 | 3.04% 394 |

Taney County is divided into three legislative districts in the Missouri House of Representatives, all of which are held by Republicans.

- District 138 — Currently represented by Don Phillips (R-Kimberling City) and consists of a small part the southwestern section of the county.

Missouri House of Representatives — District 138 — Taney County (2016)
| Party | Candidate | Votes | % | ±% |
|---|---|---|---|---|
| Republican | Don Phillips | 559 | 100.00% | |

Missouri House of Representatives — District 138 — Taney County (2014)
| Party | Candidate | Votes | % | ±% |
|---|---|---|---|---|
| Republican | Don Phillips | 298 | 100.00% | |

Missouri House of Representatives — District 138 — Taney County (2012)
| Party | Candidate | Votes | % | ±% |
|---|---|---|---|---|
| Republican | Don Phillips | 556 | 100.00% | |

- District 155 — Currently represented by Lyle Rowland (R-Cedar Creek) and consists of the eastern part of the county, including Cedar Creek, Forsyth, Kirbyville, Kissee Mills, Powersite, and Taneyville.

Missouri House of Representatives — District 155 — Taney County (2016)
| Party | Candidate | Votes | % | ±% |
|---|---|---|---|---|
| Republican | Lyle Rowland | 5,280 | 100.00% | |

Missouri House of Representatives — District 155 — Taney County (2014)
| Party | Candidate | Votes | % | ±% |
|---|---|---|---|---|
| Republican | Lyle Rowland | 2,586 | 100.00% | |

Missouri House of Representatives — District 155 — Taney County (2012)
| Party | Candidate | Votes | % | ±% |
|---|---|---|---|---|
| Republican | Lyle Rowland | 4,929 | 100.00% | |

- District 156 — Currently represented by Jeffery Justus (R-Branson) and consists of most of the western part of the county, including Branson, Bull Creek, Hollister, Merriam Woods, Ridgedale, Rockaway Beach, and Table Rock.

Missouri House of Representatives — District 156 — Taney County (2016)
| Party | Candidate | Votes | % | ±% |
|---|---|---|---|---|
| Republican | Jeffery Justus | 14,635 | 100.00% | |

Missouri House of Representatives — District 156 — Taney County (2014)
| Party | Candidate | Votes | % | ±% |
|---|---|---|---|---|
| Republican | Jeffery Justus | 6,492 | 100.00% | |

Missouri House of Representatives — District 156 — Taney County (2012)
| Party | Candidate | Votes | % | ±% |
|---|---|---|---|---|
| Republican | Jeffery Justus | 13,072 | 100.00% | |

All of Taney County is a part of Missouri's 29th District in the Missouri Senate and is currently represented by David Sater (R-Cassville).

Missouri Senate — District 29 — Taney County (2016)
| Party | Candidate | Votes | % | ±% |
|---|---|---|---|---|
| Republican | David Sater | 19,825 | 100.00% | |

Missouri Senate — District 29 — Taney County (2012)
| Party | Candidate | Votes | % | ±% |
|---|---|---|---|---|
| Republican | David Sater | 18,209 | 100.00% | |

=== Federal ===
U.S. Senate — Missouri — Taney County (2016)
| Party | Candidate | Votes | % | ±% |
|---|---|---|---|---|
| Republican | Roy Blunt | 16,117 | 69.00% | +12.93 |
| Democratic | Jason Kander | 6,143 | 26.30% | −10.49 |
| Libertarian | Jonathan Dine | 609 | 2.61% | −4.53 |
| Green | Johnathan McFarland | 262 | 1.12% | +1.12 |
| Constitution | Fred Ryman | 226 | 0.97% | +0.97 |

U.S. Senate — Missouri — Taney County (2012)
| Party | Candidate | Votes | % | ±% |
|---|---|---|---|---|
| Republican | Todd Akin | 11,940 | 56.07% | |
| Democratic | Claire McCaskill | 7,834 | 36.79% | |
| Libertarian | Jonathan Dine | 1,520 | 7.14% | |

Taney County is in Missouri's 7th Congressional District, represented by Eric Burlison in the United States House of Representatives.

U.S. House of Representatives — Missouri's 7th Congressional District — Taney County (2016)
| Party | Candidate | Votes | % | ±% |
|---|---|---|---|---|
| Republican | Billy Long | 17,569 | 76.16% | +2.99 |
| Democratic | Genevieve Williams | 4,664 | 20.22% | −1.15 |
| Libertarian | Benjamin T. Brixey | 836 | 3.62% | −1.84 |

U.S. House of Representatives — Missouri's 7th Congressional District — Taney County (2014)
| Party | Candidate | Votes | % | ±% |
|---|---|---|---|---|
| Republican | Billy Long | 7,709 | 73.17% | +2.55 |
| Democratic | Jim Evans | 2,251 | 21.37% | −3.37 |
| Libertarian | Kevin Craig | 575 | 5.46% | +0.82 |

U.S. House of Representatives — Missouri's 7th Congressional District — Taney County (2012)
| Party | Candidate | Votes | % | ±% |
|---|---|---|---|---|
| Republican | Billy Long | 14,841 | 70.62% | |
| Democratic | Jim Evans | 5,199 | 24.74% | |
| Libertarian | Kevin Craig | 975 | 4.64% | |

==== Political culture ====
United States presidential election results for Taney County, Missouri
| Year | Republican | | Democratic | | Third party(ies) | |
| Year | No. | % | No. | % | No. | % |
|---|---|---|---|---|---|---|
| 1888 | 827 | 59.03% | 471 | 33.62% | 103 | 7.35% |
| 1892 | 791 | 59.30% | 459 | 34.41% | 84 | 6.30% |
| 1896 | 1,024 | 52.35% | 925 | 47.29% | 7 | 0.36% |
| 1900 | 1,137 | 59.16% | 753 | 39.18% | 32 | 1.66% |
| 1904 | 1,162 | 64.34% | 568 | 31.45% | 76 | 4.21% |
| 1908 | 1,080 | 61.12% | 628 | 35.54% | 59 | 3.34% |
| 1912 | 852 | 47.78% | 588 | 32.98% | 343 | 19.24% |
| 1916 | 1,123 | 60.87% | 679 | 36.80% | 43 | 2.33% |
| 1920 | 2,001 | 67.69% | 913 | 30.89% | 42 | 1.42% |
| 1924 | 1,710 | 61.49% | 981 | 35.28% | 90 | 3.24% |
| 1928 | 2,319 | 70.23% | 971 | 29.41% | 12 | 0.36% |
| 1932 | 2,045 | 51.29% | 1,911 | 47.93% | 31 | 0.78% |
| 1936 | 2,827 | 62.00% | 1,710 | 37.50% | 23 | 0.50% |
| 1940 | 3,167 | 67.61% | 1,497 | 31.96% | 20 | 0.43% |
| 1944 | 2,499 | 72.56% | 936 | 27.18% | 9 | 0.26% |
| 1948 | 2,361 | 62.18% | 1,427 | 37.58% | 9 | 0.24% |
| 1952 | 3,037 | 73.22% | 1,099 | 26.49% | 12 | 0.29% |
| 1956 | 3,218 | 68.54% | 1,477 | 31.46% | 0 | 0.00% |
| 1960 | 3,692 | 71.95% | 1,439 | 28.05% | 0 | 0.00% |
| 1964 | 2,741 | 51.86% | 2,544 | 48.14% | 0 | 0.00% |
| 1968 | 3,289 | 66.82% | 1,219 | 24.77% | 414 | 8.41% |
| 1972 | 4,982 | 77.64% | 1,435 | 22.36% | 0 | 0.00% |
| 1976 | 4,696 | 56.28% | 3,626 | 43.46% | 22 | 0.26% |
| 1980 | 6,230 | 63.22% | 3,389 | 34.39% | 235 | 2.38% |
| 1984 | 7,082 | 70.86% | 2,912 | 29.14% | 0 | 0.00% |
| 1988 | 7,043 | 64.16% | 3,888 | 35.42% | 46 | 0.42% |
| 1992 | 6,081 | 46.05% | 4,682 | 35.46% | 2,442 | 18.49% |
| 1996 | 6,844 | 52.01% | 4,623 | 35.13% | 1,693 | 12.86% |
| 2000 | 9,647 | 63.84% | 5,092 | 33.70% | 373 | 2.47% |
| 2004 | 13,578 | 70.43% | 5,601 | 29.05% | 101 | 0.52% |
| 2008 | 14,736 | 67.78% | 6,683 | 30.74% | 322 | 1.48% |
| 2012 | 15,746 | 72.44% | 5,479 | 25.20% | 513 | 2.36% |
| 2016 | 18,276 | 77.20% | 4,373 | 18.47% | 1,024 | 4.33% |
| 2020 | 20,508 | 78.01% | 5,339 | 20.31% | 441 | 1.68% |
| 2024 | 21,236 | 79.17% | 5,329 | 19.87% | 259 | 0.97% |

Taney County is a Republican stronghold in presidential elections. George W. Bush carried Taney County in 2000 and 2004 by more than two-to-one margins. Taney County strongly favored John McCain over Barack Obama in 2008. The last time the Republican Party failed to carry Taney County was in 1860.

Like most rural areas throughout the Bible Belt in Southwest Missouri, voters in Taney County traditionally adhere to socially and culturally conservative principles which tend to strongly influence their Republican leanings. In 2004, Missourians voted on a constitutional amendment to define marriage as the union between a man and a woman. It passed Taney County with 80.04 percent of the vote, and the state in general with 71 percent of support from voters, making Missouri the first state to ban same-sex marriage. In 2006, Missourians voted on a constitutional amendment to fund and legalize embryonic stem cell research in the state—it failed in Taney County with 56.64 percent voting against the measure. The initiative narrowly passed the state with 51 percent of support from voters as Missouri became one of the first states in the nation to approve embryonic stem cell research. Despite Taney County's longstanding tradition of supporting socially conservative platforms, voters in the county have a penchant for advancing populist causes like increasing the minimum wage. In 2006, Missourians voted on a proposition (Proposition B) to increase the minimum wage in the state to $6.50 an hour—it passed Taney County with 77.78 percent of the vote. The proposition strongly passed every single county in Missouri with 78.99 percent voting in favor as the minimum wage was increased to $6.50 an hour in the state. During the same election, voters in five other states also strongly approved increases in the minimum wage.

=== Missouri presidential preference primary (2008) ===
In the 2008 presidential primary, voters in Taney County from both political parties supported candidates who finished in second place in the state at large and nationally.

Former Governor Mike Huckabee (R-Arkansas) received more votes, a total of 3,850, than any candidate from either party in Taney County during the 2008 presidential primary.

== Communities ==
=== Cities ===
- Branson (small portion in Stone County; largest city)
- Forsyth (county seat)
- Hollister
- Merriam Woods
- Rockaway Beach

=== Villages ===
- Bull Creek
- Kirbyville
- Saddlebrooke (mostly in Christian County)
- Taneyville

=== Census-designated place ===
- Kissee Mills

=== Unincorporated communities ===
- Bradleyville
- Brownbranch
- Cedar Creek
- Day
- Dickens
- Eastview
- Garber
- Hercules
- Hilda
- McClurg
- Mildred
- Mincy
- Ozark Beach
- Point Lookout
- Powersite
- Protem
- Ridgedale
- Swan
- Table Rock
- Walnut Shade

== See also ==
- List of sundown towns in the United States
- National Register of Historic Places listings in Taney County, Missouri
