= Forsyth, Missouri =

City in Missouri, U.S.

- City
- Location of Forsyth, Missouri
- Coordinates: 36°41′12″N 93°06′46″W
- Country: United States
- State: Missouri
- County: Taney

Government
  - Mayor: Missi Hesketh

Area
  - Total: 3.39 sq mi (8.78 km^{2})
  - Land: 3.37 sq mi (8.72 km^{2})
  - Water: 0.023 sq mi (0.06 km^{2})
- Elevation: 679 ft (207 m)

Population (2020)
  - Total: 2,730
  - Density: 811.1/sq mi (313.17/km^{2})
- Time zone: UTC-6 (Central (CST))
  - Summer (DST): UTC-5 (CDT)
- ZIP code: 65653
- Area code: 417
- FIPS code: 29-25192
- GNIS feature ID: 2394793
- Website: forsythmo.gov

Forsyth (/ˈfɔːrsaɪθ/ FOR-sythe) is a city in and the county seat of Taney County, Missouri, United States. The population was 2,730 at the 2020 census. The town is part of the Branson micropolitan area. Forsyth is located on Lake Taneycomo on U.S. Route 160.

== History ==
A post office called Forsyth has been in operation since 1837. The community has the name of John Forsyth, 13th United States Secretary of State.

== Demographics ==
Historical population
Census	Pop.	Note	%±
1860	88		—
1870	87		−1.1%
1910	478		—
1920	200		−58.2%
1930	281		40.5%
1940	290		3.2%
1950	354		22.1%
1960	489		38.1%
1970	803		64.2%
1980	1,010		25.8%
1990	1,175		16.3%
2000	1,686		43.5%
2010	2,255		33.7%
2020	2,730		21.1%
U.S. Decennial Census

=== 2020 census ===
As of the 2020 census, Forsyth had a population of 2,730. The median age was 50.2 years. 19.1% of residents were under the age of 18 and 31.2% of residents were 65 years of age or older. For every 100 females there were 94.7 males, and for every 100 females age 18 and over there were 87.5 males age 18 and over.

92.9% of residents lived in urban areas, while 7.1% lived in rural areas.

There were 1,151 households in Forsyth, of which 20.9% had children under the age of 18 living in them. Of all households, 44.4% were married-couple households, 15.8% were households with a male householder and no spouse or partner present, and 35.3% were households with a female householder and no spouse or partner present. About 36.6% of all households were made up of individuals and 23.0% had someone living alone who was 65 years of age or older.

There were 1,354 housing units, of which 15.0% were vacant. The homeowner vacancy rate was 4.1% and the rental vacancy rate was 9.0%.

Racial composition as of the 2020 census
Race	Number	Percent
White	2,513	92.1%
Black or African American	14	0.5%
American Indian and Alaska Native	15	0.5%
Asian	15	0.5%
Native Hawaiian and Other Pacific Islander	3	0.1%
Some other race	32	1.2%
Two or more races	138	5.1%
Hispanic or Latino (of any race)	77	2.8%

=== 2010 census ===
As of the census of 2010, there were 2,255 people, 967 households, and 590 families living in the city. The population density was 1,006.7 inhabitants per square mile (388.7/km^{2}). There were 1,164 housing units at an average density of 519.6 per square mile (200.6/km^{2}). The racial makeup of the city was 96.1% White, 0.3% African American, 0.9% Native American, 0.4% Asian, 0.5% from other races, and 1.8% from two or more races. Hispanic or Latino of any race were 3.0% of the population.

There were 967 households, of which 21.4% had children under the age of 18 living with them, 49.3% were married couples living together, 7.8% had a female householder with no husband present, 3.9% had a male householder with no wife present, and 39.0% were non-families. 34.7% of all households were made up of individuals, and 22.1% had someone living alone who was 65 years of age or older. The average household size was 2.11 and the average family size was 2.68.

The median age in the city was 51.7 years. 16.4% of residents were under the age of 18; 6% were between the ages of 18 and 24; 20% were from 25 to 44; 24.9% were from 45 to 64; and 32.6% were 65 years of age or older. The gender makeup of the city was 47.6% male and 52.4% female.

=== 2000 census ===
As of the census of 2000, there were 1,686 people, 788 households, and 487 families living in the city. The population density was 824.9 inhabitants per square mile (318.5/km^{2}). There were 918 housing units at an average density of 449.2 per square mile (173.4/km^{2}). The racial makeup of the city was 98.58% White, 0.06% African American, 0.30% Native American, 0.18% Asian, 0.42% from other races, and 0.47% from two or more races. Hispanic or Latino of any race were 1.01% of the population.

There were 788 households, out of which 18.4% had children under the age of 18 living with them, 53.7% were married couples living together, 6.5% had a female householder with no husband present, and 38.1% were non-families. 34.8% of all households were made up of individuals, and 20.6% had someone living alone who was 65 years of age or older. The average household size was 2.04 and the average family size was 2.59.

In the city, the population was spread out, with 16.9% under the age of 18, 4.7% from 18 to 24, 20.6% from 25 to 44, 24.3% from 45 to 64, and 33.5% who were 65 years of age or older. The median age was 53 years. For every 100 females, there were 84.9 males. For every 100 females age 18 and over, there were 79.8 males.

The median income for a household in the city was $31,801, and the median income for a family was $39,625. Males had a median income of $30,882 versus $19,183 for females. The per capita income for the city was $21,436. About 5.4% of families and 9.7% of the population were below the poverty line, including 17.3% of those under age 18 and 8.1% of those age 65 or over.

== Geography ==
Forsyth is located at 36°41′12″N 93°6′46″W. According to the United States Census Bureau, the city has a total area of 2.25 square miles (5.83 km^{2}), of which 2.24 square miles (5.80 km^{2}) is land and 0.01 square miles (0.03 km^{2}) is water.

=== Climate ===
Climate data for Forsyth, Missouri (1991–2020 normals, extremes 1946–present)
Month	Jan	Feb	Mar	Apr	May	Jun	Jul	Aug	Sep	Oct	Nov	Dec	Year
Record high °F (°C)	80 (27)	87 (31)	90 (32)	96 (36)	103 (39)	105 (41)	116 (47)	111 (44)	106 (41)	96 (36)	90 (32)	81 (27)	116 (47)
Mean maximum °F (°C)	68.9 (20.5)	72.8 (22.7)	80.4 (26.9)	85.9 (29.9)	89.9 (32.2)	94.7 (34.8)	98.1 (36.7)	98.9 (37.2)	93.6 (34.2)	86.2 (30.1)	76.7 (24.8)	69.5 (20.8)	100.2 (37.9)
Mean daily maximum °F (°C)	47.5 (8.6)	52.6 (11.4)	61.6 (16.4)	71.7 (22.1)	79.4 (26.3)	87.8 (31.0)	91.9 (33.3)	90.9 (32.7)	83.9 (28.8)	72.9 (22.7)	60.5 (15.8)	50.4 (10.2)	70.9 (21.6)
Daily mean °F (°C)	35.9 (2.2)	40.0 (4.4)	48.3 (9.1)	57.7 (14.3)	66.5 (19.2)	75.4 (24.1)	79.3 (26.3)	77.9 (25.5)	70.8 (21.6)	59.3 (15.2)	47.9 (8.8)	39.2 (4.0)	58.2 (14.6)
Mean daily minimum °F (°C)	24.2 (−4.3)	27.5 (−2.5)	35.1 (1.7)	43.8 (6.6)	53.6 (12.0)	62.9 (17.2)	66.7 (19.3)	64.9 (18.3)	57.6 (14.2)	45.7 (7.6)	35.4 (1.9)	27.9 (−2.3)	45.4 (7.4)
Mean minimum °F (°C)	8.0 (−13.3)	11.1 (−11.6)	18.9 (−7.3)	29.5 (−1.4)	39.6 (4.2)	52.1 (11.2)	57.5 (14.2)	55.6 (13.1)	43.9 (6.6)	30.8 (−0.7)	21.3 (−5.9)	12.8 (−10.7)	4.0 (−15.6)
Record low °F (°C)	−15 (−26)	−19 (−28)	4 (−16)	19 (−7)	29 (−2)	40 (4)	48 (9)	40 (4)	30 (−1)	21 (−6)	6 (−14)	−12 (−24)	−19 (−28)
Average precipitation inches (mm)	2.67 (68)	2.51 (64)	4.15 (105)	4.85 (123)	5.28 (134)	4.24 (108)	4.25 (108)	3.11 (79)	4.13 (105)	3.74 (95)	3.93 (100)	2.82 (72)	45.68 (1,160)
Average snowfall inches (cm)	2.3 (5.8)	1.8 (4.6)	1.0 (2.5)	0.0 (0.0)	0.0 (0.0)	0.0 (0.0)	0.0 (0.0)	0.0 (0.0)	0.0 (0.0)	0.0 (0.0)	0.0 (0.0)	1.7 (4.3)	6.8 (17)
Average precipitation days (≥ 0.01 in)	6.6	6.2	8.9	9.0	10.1	9.0	8.0	7.8	7.2	7.8	6.9	6.9	94.4
Average snowy days (≥ 0.1 in)	1.2	1.1	0.3	0.0	0.0	0.0	0.0	0.0	0.0	0.0	0.0	0.8	3.4
Source: NOAA

== Education ==
Forsyth R-III School District operates one elementary school, one middle school and Forsyth High School.

Forsyth has a lending library, the Forsyth Public Library.

== See also ==
- List of municipalities in Missouri
