= National Register of Historic Places listings in Mississippi County, Missouri =

Location of Mississippi County in Missouri

This is a list of the National Register of Historic Places listings in Mississippi County, Missouri.

This is intended to be a complete list of the properties and districts on the National Register of Historic Places in Mississippi County, Missouri, United States. Latitude and longitude coordinates are provided for many National Register properties and districts; these locations may be seen together in a map.

There are 12 properties and districts listed on the National Register in the county.

This National Park Service list is complete through NPS recent listings posted August 29, 2025.

== Current listings ==
	Name on the Register	Image	Date listed	Location	City or town	Description
1	Beckwith's Fort Archeological Site	Beckwith's Fort Archeological Site	July 29, 1969 (#69000113)	County Road 502; 36°41′36″N 89°14′08″W	Wolf Island	Also known as Towosahgy State Historic Site
2	Crosno Fortified Village Archeological Site		May 21, 1969 (#69000112)	Southeastern quarter of Section 23, Township 25 North, Range 17 East; 36°47′41″N 89°10′51″W	Crosno	
3	Hearnes Site	Hearnes Site	November 26, 1973 (#73001047)	U.S. Route 60 east of Charleston, immediately west of the Charleston Country Club; 36°55′23″N 89°18′12″W	Charleston	
4	Hess Archeological Site		July 12, 1974 (#74001081)	Midway between Pinhook and Towosahgy State Historic Site, east of Missouri Route F1; 36°43′08″N 89°15′04″W	East Prairie	
5	Hoecake Village Archeological Site		January 13, 1972 (#72000723)	2.5 miles (4.0 km) west of Pinhook; 36°44′20″N 89°18′46″W	East Prairie	Smithsonian trinomial 23MI8
6	McCutchen Theatre	McCutchen Theatre	August 6, 2019 (#100004271)	106 E. Commercial St. 36°55′24″N 89°20′59″W	Charleston	
7	Missouri Pacific Depot	Missouri Pacific Depot	November 30, 1972 (#72000722)	East of intersecting branches of the Missouri Pacific Railroad; 36°55′22″N 89°21′28″W	Charleston	
8	Moore House	Moore House	September 18, 1980 (#80002380)	403 N. Main St. 36°55′35″N 89°21′02″W	Charleston	
9	Mueller Archeological Site		August 13, 1974 (#74001082)	Address Restricted	East Prairie	
10	O'Bryan Ridge Archeological District		November 9, 1972 (#72000724)	Missouri Route 77 south of Wyatt; 36°52′02″N 89°12′54″W	Wyatt	
11	Russell Hotel	Russell Hotel	June 27, 2022 (#100007832)	200 East Commercial St. 36°55′24″N 89°20′58″W	Charleston	Three story hotel built in 1917. Made of red bricks & terracotta.
12	Jacob Swank House	Jacob Swank House	April 13, 1973 (#73001048)	0.2 miles west of Charleston on U.S. Routes 60 and 62; 36°55′20″N 89°22′16″W	Charleston	

== See also ==
- List of National Historic Landmarks in Missouri
- National Register of Historic Places listings in Missouri
