= Catalpa (disambiguation) =

Catalpa is a genus of flowering plants in the family Bignoniaceae.

Catalpa may also refer to:

== Places ==
- Catalpa, Missouri, an unincorporated community
- Catalpa, Nebraska, an unincorporated community
- Catalpa (Greenfield, Iowa), listed on the NRHP in Iowa
- Catalpa (St. Francisville, Louisiana), listed on the NRHP in Louisiana
- Catalpa Farm, Princess Anne, MD, listed on the NRHP in Maryland
- Catalpa (Culpeper, Virginia), a plantation near Culpeper in Culpeper County, Virginia

== Other ==
- Catalpa Festival, held in New York City
- Catalpa (album), an album by Jolie Holland
- US merchant ship Catalpa, of the Catalpa rescue of six Irish Fenians imprisoned in Western Australia in 1876
- USS Catalpa, various US naval vessels
