= Samos (disambiguation) =

Samos is a Greek island in the eastern Aegean Sea.

Samos may also refer to:

In geography:

- Samos (theme), a military-civilian province of the Byzantine Empire
- Samos Prefecture, a former administrative unit of Greece
- Samos Province, a former administrative unit of Greece
- Samos (constituency), an electoral district
- Samos (town), a port town on the island of Samos
- Vathy, Samos, the capital of the island of Samos
- Principality of Samos
- Samos International Airport, on the island of Samos
- Samicum, an ancient city in Triphylia, Greece
- Samos, Galicia, a village in Spain
- Samos, Lugo, the municipality around the village of Samos, Spain
- Samoš, a village in Serbia
- Samos, Missouri, a community in the United States

In fiction

- Samos, a fictional character in the Jak and Daxter game series
- Samos, First Slaver of Port Kar, a fictional character in the Gor series of novels

In other uses:

- Samos (satellite), an American surveillance satellite
- Greek ship Samos, several ships of the Hellenic Navy

== See also ==
- Same, legendary island in the Ionian Sea, near Ithaca
- Samus (disambiguation)
