= List of Sightings episodes =

The following is a list of episodes from the paranormal TV series, Sightings. The series ran from 1992 to 1998 and produced several specials and a film, Sightings: Heartland Ghost.

== Series overview ==
Season	Episodes	Originally released		
Season	Episodes	First released	Last released	Network
Fox specials	3	October 17, 1991	April 24, 1992	Fox
1	11	April 17, 1992	August 21, 1992	Fox
2	24	September 18, 1992	May 21, 1993	Fox
3	26	September 11, 1994	May 21, 1995	Syndication
4	24	September 10, 1995	May 12, 1996	Syndication
5	20	September 19, 1996	September 11, 1997	Sci-Fi Channel
Specials	6	September 20, 1996	December 23, 1998	Sci-Fi Channel
Film		October 27, 2002		Showtime

== Episodes ==
=== Fox specials (1991–92) ===
Sightings premiered on Fox in 1991 as a series of 60 minute paranormal specials.

Title	Original release date	Prod. code
"The U.F.O. Report"	October 18, 1991	39101
"The U.F.O. Report"	October 18, 1991	39102
Topics: Gulf Breeze, crop circles, cattle mutilation, the Roswell crash, abductions. People: Marina Popovich, James McDivitt, Bruce Macabee, Linda Moulton Howe, Walter Haut, Stanton Friedman, Bud Hopkins, John Mack, George Knapp, TImothy Good, Bob Lazar, Sean David Morton
"Ghosts"	February 28, 1992	39103
"Ghosts"	February 28, 1992	39104
Topics: Haunted houses, EVP, The Entity. People: Loyd Auerbach, Frank DeFelitta
"Psychic Experience"	April 24, 1992	39105
"Psychic Experience"	April 24, 1992	39106
Topics: ESP, psychokinesis, premonitions, psychic healing, telekinesis, psychic detectives, epilepsy detecting dogs. People: J. B. Rhine, Lois Duncan, Dorothy Allison

=== Season 1 (1992) ===
After a series of successful specials, Fox premiered the first season of Sightings in the spring of 1992. Each Season 1 episode is 30 minutes, as opposed to the 60 minute length of the specials.

No. overall	No. in season	Title	Original release date	Prod. code
1	1	"Near Death Experience"	April 17, 1992	39107
Definition, Evidence, Impact.
2	2	"Psychic Healing"	May 1, 1992	39108
Unexpected recoveries from life-threatening illnesses.
3	3	"Mysteries of The Earth"	May 8, 1992	39109
Forces, Evidence, Markings, Sacred Places.
4	4	"U.F.O. Contact"	May 15, 1992	39110
Research, Abduction, Surveillance, Contact.
5	5	"Monsters"	June 12, 1992	39111
Monsters, Investigations, Sea Creatures, New Discoveries.
6	6	N/A	June 26, 1992	39112
Vampires, Visions of Death, Bermuda Triangle.
7	7	N/A	July 10, 1992	39113
Vision of Murder, Men In Black, Awakening.
8	8	N/A	July 17, 1992	39114
Curses, Past Lives, Ghosts.
9	9	N/A	July 31, 1992	39115
Hauntings, Physical Effects, Superstitions.
10	10	N/A	August 14, 1992	39116
Evidence From Beyond, Gateway To Oblivion, Soul Exchange.
11	11	N/A	August 21, 1992	39201
Back From The Dead, Hauntings, Millboro.

=== Season 2 (1992–93) ===
Fox premiered the second season of Sightings in the fall of 1992. Each Season 2 episode is 30 minutes in length.

No. overall	No. in season	Original release date	Prod. code
12	1	September 11, 1992	39202
Alcatraz, Mass Sightings, U.F.O. Update.
13	2	September 18, 1992	39203
Werewolf, Paranormal Photography, Ghost Update.
14	3	September 25, 1992	39204
Encounter In Space, Marfa Lights, Ghost Update.
15	4	October 2, 1992	39205
Lizzie Borden, Deliverance, S.E.T.I. Update.
16	5	October 9, 1992	39206
The Uninvited, Haunted Family, The Curse Of Christopher Columbus.
17	6	October 16, 1992	39207
Aliens Among Us, Top Secret UFO, Ghost Investigation.
18	7	October 30, 1992	39208
Halloween Special: Scotland's House Of Horror, Vampires, Witchcraft.
19	8	November 6, 1992	39209
Epidemic of Evil, Garden Grove Ghost.
20	9	November 13, 1992	39210
Crop Circles, Royal Curse, Lake Champlain Monster.
21	10	November 20, 1992	39211
Russian U.F.O. Investigation, Ghost Of Whitechapel, Iceman Update.
22	11	December 4, 1992	39212
Deadly Abduction, Lake Champlain Monster, Royal Curse Update.
23	12	December 11, 1992	39213
Hell's Gate, Angels, Astrology Update.
24	13	January 8, 1993	39214
Astrological Predictions, Close Encounters, Spy House Investigation.
25	14	January 15, 1993	39215
Russian Psychics, Voodoo, Black Hole Update.
26	15	February 5, 1993	39216
Ghost Writer.
27	16	February 12, 1993	39217
Searching The Skies, Ouija, Phobos II Update.
28	17	February 19, 1993	39218
Cults, Super Humans, Mind Control, Ghost Writer Update.
29	18	February 26, 1993	39219
Scranton UFO Mystery, Ghost Molester, Fire in the Sky.
30	19	March 12, 1993	39220
Mass Abductions, Seizure Alert Dogs, Prophecies.
31	20	April 9, 1993	39221
Countdown To Doomsday, Russian Top Gun, Ghost Molester Update.
32	21	April 30, 1993	39223
Psychic Detectives Special: Murder in Paradise, Psychic Detective, Who Killed Sandra?, Missing Mom.
33	22	May 7, 1993	39222
UFO Cover-Up, Missing Link, Wisconsin UFOs.
34	23	May 14, 1993	39224
Ghost Special: Manressa Castle, Viewer Phone Calls, Anatomy Of A Haunting.
35	24	May 21, 1993	39225
U.F.O. Special: UFO Hot Spots, Hoaxing, Cattle Mutilation, Space Growth.

=== Season 3 (1994–95) ===
Season 3 premiered in syndication in the fall of 1994. Each Season 3 episode is now 60 minutes in length.

No. overall	No. in season	Original release date	Prod. code
36	1	September 11, 1994	3001
Heartland Ghost, Gulf Breeze Encounters, A Sculptor's Gift, Black Holes.
37	2	September 18, 1994	3002
Heartland Ghost Update, Shared Memory Abduction, Watching The Skies, Schoolroom Angel, Colorado Cattle Mutilations, Ancient Creatures.
38	3	September 25, 1994	3003
Patterns Of Denial, Pet Interpreter, Ice Circles, A Vision Of Murder, True Believers, Mars Mission Cover-Up.
39	4	October 2, 1994	3004
Sasquatch, A Gift From The Light, Intuition, Abduction: Horror Or Hype, Future Life Progression, Crop Circle Mystery.
40	5	October 9, 1994	3005
Tunguska, Embracing The Light, Human Candles, Crop Circles, Whaley House, Haunted High.
41	6	October 16, 1994	3006
Psychic Eye, Prediction Update, Dragon Project, Making Of A Hoax, Power Of Prayer, S.E.T.I. Resurrected.
42	7	October 23, 1994	3007
Halloween: Ghost Of Berry Pomeroy Castle, It Came From Outer Space, Ghost Hunt, Santeria, Moon Madness, Water Witches.
43	8	October 30, 1994	3008
U.F.O. Confrontation: Iran, Death In The Desert, Heartland Ghost Investigation, Gift Of Life, Heartland Ghost Investigation.
44	9	November 6, 1994	3009
Heartland Ghost Investigation, Nessie, Height 611, To Swim With Dolphins.
45	10	November 13, 1994	3010
U.F.O. Confrontation: Mansfield, Bodega Bay Ghost, Prophecy Of Hope, Dream Murder, Power To Heal, Encounters In Space.
46	11	November 20, 1994	3011
Apocalypse Now, A Mother's Love, Montreal Mass Sighting, Baby Jane Doe, Ishii.
47	12	November 27, 1994	3012
Ghost Of Brookdale Lodge, Gulf Breeze Update, Spontaneous Recall, Murder On Route 2, Message From Stephen, Sci-Fi Prophets.
48	13	December 4, 1994	3013
Avebury Mystery Lights, Alien Evolution, A Sculptor's Gift, Miner's Revenge, A Child's Premonition, The Big WOW.
49	14	January 15, 1995	3014
Disinformation, Russian Psychics, Crop Circle Update, Trail Of Death, Guided Imagery, Quake Sense.
50	15	January 22, 1995	3015
Time Warp, Healing Mind, New Mexico U.F.O. Mystery, Murder In Nags Head, Seventh Sense, Cattle Mutilation Update.
51	16	January 29, 1995	3016
Heartland Aftermath, Curses, Sprites And Blue Jets, Gaia's Revenge, Outback Abduction, Heartland Online.
52	17	February 5, 1995	3017
U.F.O.'s Over F.D.R., Heartland Aftermath, Multiple Mystery, Never Forget, Hyperspace, Dream Murder Update.
53	18	February 12, 1995	3018
UFO Confrontation: Kentucky, SHC Update, The Final Gift, Psychic Evidence, Restless Spirits.
54	19	February 19, 1995	3019
Mexico Mass Sightings, Twinless Twins, Conspiracy Of Silence, Cloning, Animal Communication.
55	20	February 26, 1995	3020
Idaho U.F.O. Flap, Coma Healer, Perfect Harmony, Search For Danny, Haunted Knickerbocker, Mexico Mass Sightings Update.
56	21	April 16, 1995	3021
Top Secret Projects, Roswell Revisited, K-911, A Call For Help, Lady In White, Taos Hum.
57	22	April 23, 1995	3022
Allagash Abduction, Future Shock, Baleroy Ghost, Touched By Angels, U.F.O. Home Videos.
58	23	April 30, 1995	3023
My Past Life, Heartland Ghost, Clear Intent, Snake Church, Transformed By The Light.
59	24	May 7, 1995	3024
U.F.O. Contact: The Holyland, Saved By Angels, Bigfoot Update, Ghosts Of Gettysburg, Gaia's Revenge, U.F.O. Protocols.
60	25	May 14, 1995	3025
What's Inside Hangar 18, Monticello Murder, Waiting Room For The Soul, Michigan Abduction, Luck, Spark Of Life In Space.
61	26	May 21, 1995	3026
Saucers Are Real, Psychic Trauma, Walk Ins (Jason Winters), Obeah, Mexico Update, Heal Thyself.

=== Season 4 (1995–96) ===
Season 4 premiered in syndication in the fall of 1995. Each episode is 60 minutes in length. Episodes 90 thru 93 aired exclusively on The Sci-Fi Channel (now SyFy).

No. overall	No. in season	Original release date	Prod. code
62	1	September 10, 1995	4027
Intruder On The Range, What Happened To Debbie?, IN THE NEWS, The Roswell Autopsy, A Spirit Of Love, Update - Bigfoot In Ohio.
63	2	September 17, 1995	4028
Psychic Cop, Ica Mystery Stones, IN THE NEWS, The Shag Harbour Incident, Haunted Queen Mary, Sightings Online.
64	3	September 24, 1995	4029
Poor Souls, U.F.O. Encounter: Shikmona, IN THE NEWS, The Burning Within, U.F.O. Initiative.
65	4	October 1, 1995	4030
Black Forest Haunting, The Mars Complex, IN THE NEWS, Restless Warrior, Update - U.F.O. Confrontation (Iran).
66	5	October 8, 1995	4031
Generational Abduction, Blind Sight, IN THE NEWS, Amazing Grace, Haunted Catacombs, Update - Saucers Are Real.
67	6	October 15, 1995	4032
Silent Intruder, Psychic Constable, IN THE NEWS, Dream Vision, Stalked By Spirits, Update - Nellis A.F.B.
68	7	October 22, 1995	4033
Spirit Of Oregon, Tesla's Death Ray, IN THE NEWS, Consumed By Vampires, Anatomy Of An Autopsy, Update - Nessie Lives.
69	8	October 29, 1995	4034
U.F.O. Encounter At 30,000 Feet, One Missing Link, IN THE NEWS, Miracle On I-74, A Vision Through Time, Update - Crop Circles.
70	9	November 5, 1995	4035
Contact In Colorado, Boomtown Ghost, IN THE NEWS, Miracle At Betania, Update - Prophecy.
71	10	November 12, 1995	4036
Shag Harbour Investigation, Angel Of Fire, IN THE NEWS, The Curse Of H-3, Spiritual Warfare, Update - Sightings On Line (Roswell Film).
72	11	November 19, 1995	4037
Return To Black Forest, Coming From The Light, IN THE NEWS, Shag Harbour Investigation, Update - Gaia.
73	12	January 14, 1996	4038
Attack On Washington, Spiritual Exorcist, IN THE NEWS, Wandering Souls, Whitley Strieber's Breakthrough, Update: Visions Of Mary.
74	13	January 21, 1996	4039
Contact At Socorro, Shaman Healer, IN THE NEWS, Reclaiming The Farm, Close Encounters Of The Fourth Kind, Update - Gaia's Revenge.
75	14	January 28, 1996	4040
Without A Trace, IN THE NEWS, Vision Quest, The Doomsday Machine, Update - U.F.O. Investigation.
76	15	February 4, 1996	4041
Abducted, IN THE NEWS, South Bend Mystery, Renovation Haunting, Update - Star Is Born.
77	16	February 11, 1996	4042
Echoes From The Battlefield, Psychic Espionage, IN THE NEWS, Crash Of '62, Candomble, Update - Black Forest.
78	17	February 18, 1996	4043
A Search For The Truth, Murder On The Interstate, IN THE NEWS, Voices From Beyond, The Sci-Fi Prophet, Update - Contact In Israel.
79	18	March 10, 1996	4044
Murder For Hire, Healing The Causes Of Violence, IN THE NEWS, Boomtown Revisited, Ancient Visitors, Update - Martian Canals.
80	19	March 17, 1996	4045
Trapped In Time, Miracle Child, IN THE NEWS, Messengers Of Destiny, Sacred Sites, Update - Bigfoot.
81	20	April 14, 1996	4046
Edwards Encounter, My Two Lives, IN THE NEWS, Paranormal Politics, Spirit Message, Update - Face On Mars.
82	21	April 21, 1996	4047
Messages From Beyond, Cluster U.F.O., IN THE NEWS, Psychic Warrior, Update - N.D.E.
83	22	April 28, 1996	4048
Her Name Was Cathy, The New Area 51, IN THE NEWS, The Great Gadsden, Master Healer, Update - Lost Civilizations.
84	23	October 25, 1996	4049
Gallows Ghost, Re-Wiring The Brain, IN THE NEWS, Incident At Exeter, Healing Wisdom, Update - U.F.O.'s: Japan, Sightings Online.
85	24	November 1, 1996	4050
Ruwa Re-Examined, Healing Hands, IN THE NEWS, Fire From Heaven, Simulated O.B.E., Update: Ghost Investigation.

=== Season 5 (1996–97) ===
Season 5 premiered exclusively on The Sci-Fi Channel (now SyFy) in the fall of 1996. Each episode is 60 minutes in length.

No. overall	No. in season	Original release date	Prod. code
86	1	January 15, 1997	4051
Hunt House Haunting, Solar Obliteration, IN THE NEWS, The Message, Love Ties, Update - Altered States.
87	2	April 2, 1997	4052
Deliberate Deception, A Psychic's Vision, IN THE NEWS, Mausson's Mission, Highway 666, Update - Silent Intruder.
88	3	October 4, 1996	5053
Purging The Spirits, IN THE NEWS, My Brother's Keeper, The Brazilian E.T. Case, Millennium Watch: A Millennium Primer.
89	4	October 11, 1996	5054
The Iron Woman, The Way Of The Explorer, IN THE NEWS, A Time To Remember, Update - Crop Circles.
90	5	October 18, 1996	5055
Mantell Re-examined, Hands Of Remembrance, IN THE NEWS, Olivas Haunting, Omen In The Sky, Update - Life On Mars.
91	6	November 8, 1996	5056
Silent Vulcans, The Conversion Of Nick Pope, IN THE NEWS, The Haunted Jerome Grand, Reprogramming The Brain, Update - Curse Of H-3.
92	7	December 6, 1996	5057
Autopsy: Exposing A Fake, Red Lion Haunting, IN THE NEWS, Shadow Of Evil, Threat From Space, Update - Missing Soul Boy.
93	8	January 22, 1997	5058
The Watchers, Life Before Life, IN THE NEWS, Ghosts Of Chillingham Castle, Lab Of Consciousness, Millennium Watch - Mayan Prophecy.
94	9	February 5, 1997	5059
The Majestic 12 Documents, São Paulo Haunting, IN THE NEWS, Vanished, The Secret Of The Sphinx, Update - Cattle Mutilation.
95	10	February 26, 1997	5060
House Of Plenty, IN THE NEWS, 1947, Healing Harps, Update - U.F.O.'s: The Holy Land.
96	11	March 5, 1997	5061
U.F.O. Encounter: Argentina, Cancer Alert Dogs, IN THE NEWS, House Of Plenty, Update - U.F.O.'s.
97	12	March 12, 1997	5062
The Heartland Ghost, Echo Missile Encounter, IN THE NEWS, Crop Circle Video Mystery, Healing With Music, Millennium Watch - Quatrain 72.
98	13	April 9, 1997	5063
Restless Spirits, IN THE NEWS, Foo Fighters, Unexpected Visitors, Millennium Watch - The Spiritual Quest.
88	14	May 21, 1997	5064
Case Closed, Angel Of Death, IN THE NEWS, Restless Spirits, The Call Of Sasquatch, Update - Hubble Discoveries.
100	15	June 4, 1997	5065
Encounter Over England, The Way Of The Explorer, IN THE NEWS, School Spirits, Monster Of The Andes, Mars: The Next Step.
101	16	June 18, 1997	5066
Ohio's Area 51, Anyone Can See The Light, IN THE NEWS, Chicago's Most Haunted, Mysteries From Above, Update - Lunar Discoveries.
102	17	July 17, 1997	5067
The Oak Ridge Mystery, Sacred Healing, IN THE NEWS, Exposing Project Blue Book, The Soul Catcher, Update - Angels.
103	18	August 21, 1997	5068
Black Swan Haunting, IN THE NEWS, Klinger Encounter, Spirits In The Garden, Update - U.F.O.'s In Korea.
104	19	September 4, 1997	5069
To Catch A Killer, Unearthing Atlantis, IN THE NEWS, White Lady Of Avenel, Mysterious Ley Lines, Millennium Watch: Divining The Future.
105	20	September 11, 1997	5070
Incident At Cherry Creek, Power Of Chi, IN THE NEWS, Spirit Photography, Profilers, Update: Omen In The Sky.

=== Specials (1996–98) ===
In 1996, a 30-minute behind-the-scenes special was aired, entitled, Inside Sightings and Beyond. Five other 120-minute specials aired on the Sci Fi Channel entitled, In Depth and Beyond.

Title	Original release date	Prod. code
"Inside Sightings and Beyond"	September 20, 1996	ISAB1
A behind-the-scenes look at Sightings with Tim White, Carla Wohl, Henry Winkler, Ann Daniel and more.
"In Depth And Beyond: The 100 Year Cover-Up: U.F.O.'s"	January 17, 1998	IDAB1
Is Seeing Believing, The Saucers Arrive, Roswell, The UFO Cold War, The Sightings Increase, Authorities Who Believe, Now The World Knows, The Evidence Is Mounting.
"In Depth And Beyond: The Secrets of Alien Abduction"	March 14, 1998	IDAB2
Case studies show similarities between claims of alien abduction.
"In Depth And Beyond: Bioperfection: Building the New Human Race"	June 13, 1998	IDAB3
Stephen Hawking, cryonics volunteers and people with prostheses predict changes to the quality and span of peoples' lives.
"In Depth And Beyond: The Living Dead: Speaking From The Grave"	October 25, 1998	IDAB4
Beyond Death, Watch The Kid, White Bird, A Child's Past Life, The Heartland Haunting.
"In Depth And Beyond: Fire in the Brain: Unleashing the Hidden Powers of the Mind"	December 23, 1998	IDAB5
Law-enforcement and government agencies begin to validate clairvoyance, premonition and precognition.

=== Film (2002) ===
Released October 27, 2002, this film features the real-life case which took place on location during a shoot for the Heartland Ghost segments on the show.

Title	Original release date
Sightings: Heartland Ghost	October 27, 2002
In this creepy ghost story, a Kansas couple's claim that their Victorian house is haunted prompts a visit from the crew of "Sightings," a TV show exploring paranormal events. Nobody believes the couple's story - especially cynical producer Beau Bridges--but show psychic Miguel Ferrer begins feeling the presence of several entities, including a little girl.
