= Deventer, Missouri =

Unincorporated community in Missouri, United States

Coordinates: 36°49′20″N 89°12′42″W

Deventer is an unincorporated community in eastern Mississippi County, Missouri, United States. It is located on Route 77, approximately 10 miles (16 km) southeast of Charleston.

== Etymology ==
The name of the town is speculated to be originated from the Dutch city Deventer, Overijssel, The Netherlands. It is therefore very well possible that Dutch immigrants settled in the area and named a nowadays unpopulated settlement "Deventer". However, an MA thesis from 1938 has a completely different reason for naming it Deventer: in this small settlement in the eastern part of Mississippi Township, a post office was established in 1910. Mr. Frank May, a prominent landowner, asked for the post office to be established and Mr. Dave Reeves, also a landowner, went on his bond when he made application for the position of postmaster. Eight names were submitted by Mr. May to the government. These were: Earl, for a friend of Mr. May and Mr. Reeves; Reeves, for Mr. Reeves; Harris, for the father of C.P. Harris; Mayville, for Mr. May; Boyce, for a friend; Tinner, for a landowner; and Prat, for another landowner. The last name, Deventer, for Deventer Miller, now in the insurance business in St. Louis, but then a clerk in a store in Oran, and friend of Mr. May, was the name which was accepted by the postal authorities. (Mrs. Dave Reeves, Mrs. Frank May).
