= Fuget, Missouri =

Extinct hamlet in Missouri, U.S.

Coordinates: 36°48′32″N 89°11′31″W

Fuget is an extinct town in Mississippi County, in the U.S. state of Missouri. The GNIS classifies it as a populated place.

A post office called Fuget was established in 1885, and remained in operation until 1932. The community has the name of Jim Fuget, the proprietor of a local mill.
