= List of mayors of Charleston, Missouri =

The city of Charleston, Missouri, located in Missouri's 8th congressional district in southeastern Missouri, is the county seat and the largest city of Mississippi County, Missouri. The city was incorporated in 1872.

Mayor	Took office	Left office	Additional information
Thomas Jefferson Johns: (1858-1927)			c. 1917–1918, He was born in Ontario, Canada.
Willis Ransom McCracken: (1876-1948)	c. 1943	c. 1946	He was born in Ontario, Canada, and twice served as mayor.
Robert R. Davis: (c. 1913-2000)	c. 1946	c. 1948	
R. B. Patterson	c. 1948	c. 1950	
Paul Moore	c. 1950	1952	
Robert R. Davis: (c. 1913-2000)		1952	(Previously served as mayor.)
Max Friedman	1952	1954	
Charles A. Goodin		c. 1955	
James Atteberry: (1915-1985)	1955	1956	He served in the US Army during World War II.
Max Friedman	c. 1956	c. 1957	(Previously served as mayor.)
Charles I. Lutz Jr.: (1909-1999)	1957	1959	He was a U.S. Army colonel.
Arthur J. "Buck" Drinkwater Jr.: (1903-2001)	1959	1960	
Dr. Thomas Page Fenton: (1914-1988)	1961	1962	Died before his wife Dr. Alouise Carter Fenton (1915-2005).
E. R. Putnam	c. 1962	c. 1963	
William G. Knight: (1923-1988)	1963	1964	
Philip James "Pete" Ponder: (1916-2009)	c. 1964	c. 1965	He served three terms as mayor and owned and operated a car dealership and an equipment company.
R. B. Logan Jr.	c. 1965	c. 1965	
Charles E. Wright: (died 2001)	c. 1965	c. 1966	
Dr. Thomas Page Fenton: (1914-1988)	1967	1968	(Previously served as mayor.)
Joseph Willis Layton Sr: (1933-1995)	1969	1970	3rd Generation Mayor son of Carl William Layton (former mayor), grandson of Willis Ransom McCracken (former mayor). Born 1933 in Charleston, Missouri.
Sam E. Story Sr.: (1928-2002)	1971	1972	He served in U.S. Navy during the Korean War.
Charles Richard Williams Sr.: (1940-2017)	1972	c. 1973	Charleston's first black mayor. In 1974, he became a founding member of the Black Mayors Conference in Fayette, Mississippi. He owned three funeral homes.
Dr. Lowell Nicholas: (1941-2017)	1973	1974	He was a dentist from Arkansas.
William G. Knight: (1923-1988)	1975	1976	(Previously served as mayor.)
Duane Eastman: (1935-2006)	c. 1976	c. 1978	
Jackie Whiteside	1979	1980	
Ernest Carman	1980	c. 1981	
Don Daughhetee: (1924-1995)	1981	1982	He served as sergeant major during World War II.
Howard Terry Rowe: (1945-2021)	1983	1984	He had a master's degree in speech pathology and served in the U.S. Navy on the USS Thetis Bay which was President Kennedy's helicopter ship.
Jackie Whiteside	1985	1986	(Previously served as mayor.)
Larry Smith	1987	1988	
Howard Terry Rowe: (1945-2021)	1989	1990	(Previously served as mayor.)
Don Daughhetee: (1924-1995)	1990	c. 1992	(Previously served as mayor.)
Jackie Whiteside	c. 1992	c. 1994	(Previously served as mayor.)
Larry Smith	1996	1998	
Jackie Whiteside	1998	2000	(Previously served as mayor.)
Jackie Whiteside	c. 2006	c. 2008	(Previously served as mayor.)
Philip Halter		2022	
Michael Jones			
Richard Toon	2022	2023	
Patrick Farmer	2023		
Jackie Whiteside		2024	(Previously served as mayor.)
Monica Goodin	2025	2026	Charleston’s first female mayor
Jason Oliver	2026		

== Key ==
Key to party colors and abbreviations for members of the U.S. Congress and other politicians or officials
Alaskan Independence (AKIP) Know Nothing (KN) American Labor (AL) Anti-Jacksonian (Anti-J); National Republican (NR) Anti-Administration (AA) Anti-Masonic (Anti-M) Conservative (Con) Covenant (Cov)	Democratic (D) Democratic–Farmer–Labor (DFL) Democratic–NPL (D-NPL) Dixiecrat (Dix), States' Rights (SR) Democratic-Republican (DR) Farmer–Labor (FL) Federalist (F); Pro-Administration (PA)	Free Soil (FS) Fusion (Fus) Greenback (GB) Independence (IPM) Jacksonian (J) Liberal (Lib) Libertarian (L) National Union (NU)	Nonpartisan League (NPL) Nullifier (N) Opposition Northern (O); Opposition Southern (O) Populist (Pop) Progressive (Prog) Prohibition (Proh) Readjuster (Rea)	Republican (R) Silver (Sv) Silver Republican (SvR) Socialist (Soc) Union (U) Unconditional Union (UU) Vermont Progressive (VP) Whig (W)	Independent (I) Nonpartisan (NP)
