= Whiting, Missouri =

- Census-designated place
- Interactive map of Whiting, Missouri
- Coordinates: 36°47′18″N 89°22′32″W
- Country: United States
- State: Missouri
- County: Mississippi

Area
  - Total: 0.26 sq mi (0.68 km^{2})
  - Land: 0.26 sq mi (0.68 km^{2})
  - Water: 0 sq mi (0.00 km^{2})
- Elevation: 308 ft (94 m)

Population (2020)
  - Total: 155
  - Density: 594.0/sq mi (229.36/km^{2})
- ZIP Code: 63845 (East Prairie)
- FIPS code: 29-79684
- GNIS feature ID: 2806415

Whiting is an unincorporated community and census-designated place in Mississippi County, in the U.S. state of Missouri. As of the 2020 census, the population was 155.

== History ==
A post office called Whiting was established in 1889, and remained in operation until 1909. The community has the name of Justin R. Whiting, a businessperson in the local lumber industry.

== Geography ==
Whiting is in southwestern Mississippi County and is bordered to the southwest by the city of East Prairie. Missouri Route 105 is the main road through the community, leading southwest into East Prairie and north 9 miles (14 km) to Charleston, the county seat.

According to the U.S. Census Bureau, the Whiting CDP has an area of 0.26 square miles (0.67 km^{2}), all land.

== Demographics ==
Historical population
Census	Pop.	Note	%±
2020	155		—
U.S. Decennial Census

Whiting first appeared as a census designated place in the 2020 U.S. census.

== Education ==
It is in the East Prairie R-II School District.
