= Lanie Black =

American politician (1946–2020)

Lanie Black III

Member of the Missouri House of Representatives

Personal details
- Born: December 30, 1946 Cairo, Illinois
- Died: November 16, 2020 (aged 73) Bernie, Missouri
- Party: Republican
- Spouse: Ann Rita Cox (m. 1970)
- Education: Southeast Missouri State University
- Occupation: farmer U.S. Navy officer

Lanie George Black III (December 30, 1946 – November 16, 2020) was an American politician, Navy veteran, farmer, poultry producer, chaplain, and substitute teacher from the state of Missouri. In 1998, he became the first Republican state representative for Mississippi County, Missouri, since Reconstruction about 150 years ago. In 1996, he was defeated by Fred E. "Gene" Copeland, the Dean of the Missouri House. In 1998, he was elected by defeating former Missouri First Lady Betty Cooper Hearnes, his choir director. In the Missouri legislature he often worked with Peter Myers, a former U.S. Deputy Secretary of Agriculture, who lived in a neighboring district.

Black was born on December 30, 1946, in Cairo, Illinois. He was raised in nearby Charleston, Missouri. Black progressed the Boy Scouts and became an Eagle Scout. In 1965, he graduated from Charleston High School. In 1970, he graduated from Vanderbilt University in Nashville, Tennessee, with bachelor's degree in chemical engineering and soon married Ann Rita Cox, his childhood friend, on July 11, 1970. Black attended Navy Officer Candidate School in Newport, Rhode Island, trained as a Navy Deep Sea Diver in Washington, D.C., and spent one year in Norfolk, Virginia, eventually becoming a weapons officer and chaplain for the USS Beaufort. He also served as chaplain for the Missouri legislature and taught Sunday School classes for over 45 years.

In 1994, Black was named Charleston's Man of the Year. He also served as president and ran the Dogwood Azalea Dog Show, was a longtime member of the Charleston Kiwanis Club, and was an avid golfer. He was married for over 50 years. Black was also an attendant of First Baptist Church in Charleston, Missouri.

Black died November 16, 2020, at a nursing home in Bernie, Missouri. He was buried with military honors at the IOOF Cemetery just north of Charleston. Black was a tremendous and influential presence in his church and hometown, and was a man after God's own heart.
