= Wilson City, Missouri =

Village in Missouri, United States

- Village
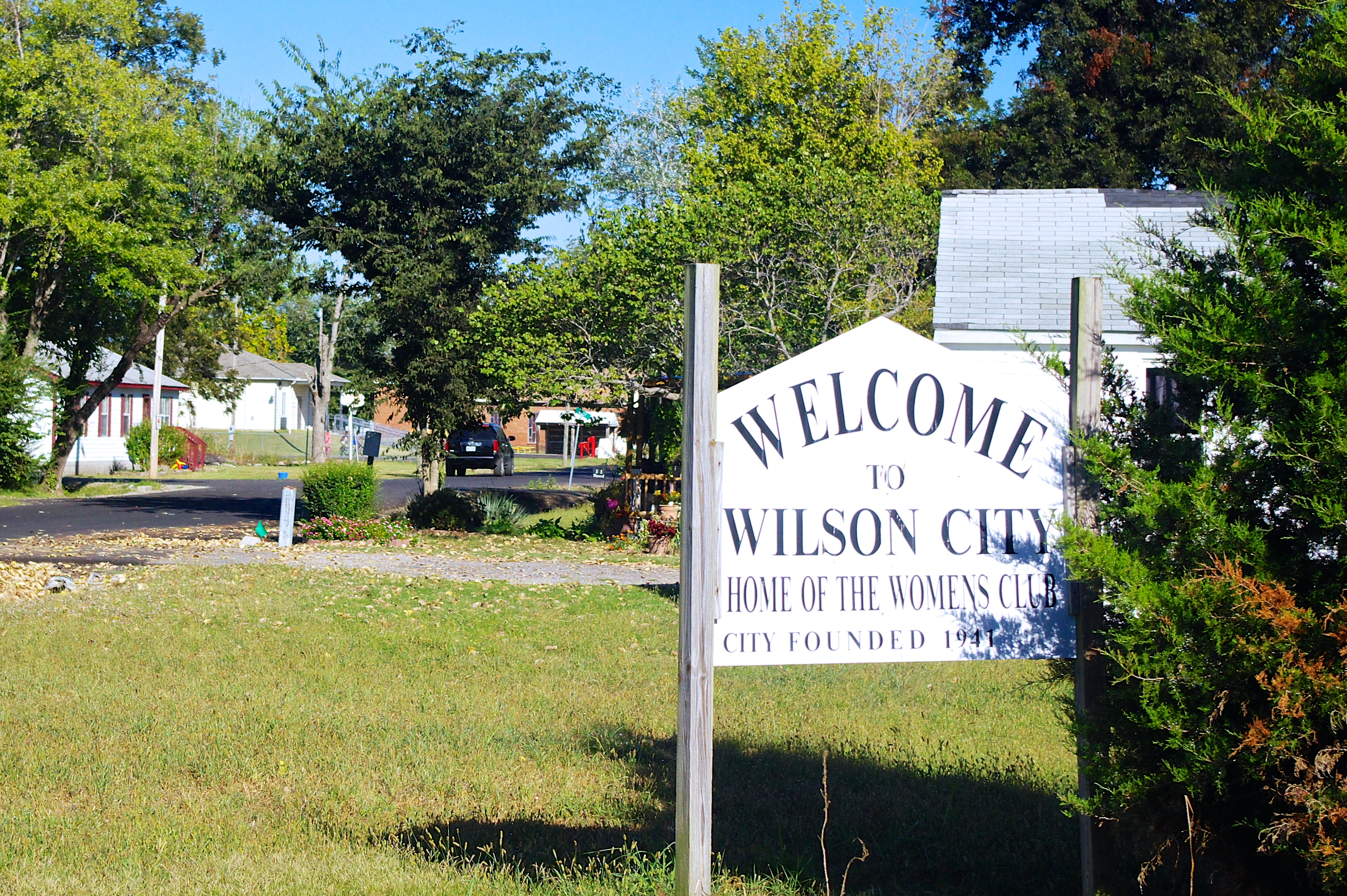
- Wilson City

- Location in Mississippi County and the state of Missouri
- Coordinates: 36°55′25″N 89°13′23″W
- Country: United States
- State: Missouri
- County: Mississippi

Area
  - Total: 0.073 sq mi (0.19 km^{2})
  - Land: 0.073 sq mi (0.19 km^{2})
  - Water: 0 sq mi (0.00 km^{2})
- Elevation: 312 ft (95 m)

Population (2020)
  - Total: 77
  - Density: 1,023.8/sq mi (395.29/km^{2})
- Time zone: UTC-6 (Central (CST))
  - Summer (DST): UTC-5 (CDT)
- ZIP Code: 63882 (Wyatt)
- FIPS code: 29-80260
- GNIS feature ID: 2399708

Wilson City is a village in Mississippi County, Missouri, United States. The population was 77 at the 2020 census.

== History ==
Wilson City was one of several villages constructed in the early 1940s as part of the "Delmo Project", an initiative by the Farm Security Administration to aid displaced tenant farmers. The village was initially known as "North Wyatt", or the "North Wyatt Group", but had adopted its current name by the late 1960s. The Delmo villages were segregated by race, and Wilson City was one of four Delmo villages designated for African Americans.

== Geography ==
Wilson City is situated in northeastern Mississippi County, 5 miles (8 km) southwest of the confluence of the Mississippi and Ohio rivers. The small city of Wyatt lies along Missouri Route 77, a mile south of Wilson City. U.S. Route 62 connects Wilson City with Charleston, the county seat, to the west and Cairo, Illinois, to the northeast.

According to the U.S. Census Bureau, Wilson City has a total area of 0.08 square miles (0.21 km^{2}), all land.

== Demographics ==
Historical population
Census	Pop.	Note	%±
1960	274		—
1970	295		7.7%
1980	309		4.7%
1990	210		−32.0%
2000	165		−21.4%
2010	115		−30.3%
2020	77		−33.0%
U.S. Decennial Census

=== 2020 census ===
Wilson City, Missouri – Racial and ethnic composition Note: the US Census treats Hispanic/Latino as an ethnic category. This table excludes Latinos from the racial categories and assigns them to a separate category. Hispanics/Latinos may be of any race.
Race / Ethnicity (NH = Non-Hispanic)	Pop 2000	Pop 2010	Pop 2020	% 2000	% 2010	% 2020
White alone (NH)	6	3	2	3.64%	2.61%	2.60%
Black or African American alone (NH)	159	112	69	96.36%	97.39%	89.61%
Native American or Alaska Native alone (NH)	0	0	0	0.00%	0.00%	0.00%
Asian alone (NH)	0	0	0	0.00%	0.00%	0.00%
Pacific Islander alone (NH)	0	0	0	0.00%	0.00%	0.00%
Other race alone (NH)	0	0	0	0.00%	0.00%	0.00%
Mixed race or Multiracial (NH)	0	0	3	0.00%	0.00%	3.90%
Hispanic or Latino (any race)	0	0	3	0.00%	0.00%	3.90%
Total	165	115	77	100.00%	100.00%	100.00%

=== 2010 census ===
As of the census of 2010, there were 115 people, 56 households, and 25 families residing in the village. The population density was 1,437.5 inhabitants per square mile (555.0/km^{2}). There were 74 housing units at an average density of 925.0 per square mile (357.1/km^{2}). The racial makeup of the village was 2.61% White and 97.39% Black or African American.

There were 56 households, of which 19.6% had children under the age of 18 living with them, 5.4% were married couples living together, 30.4% had a female householder with no husband present, 8.9% had a male householder with no wife present, and 55.4% were non-families. 51.8% of all households were made up of individuals, and 14.3% had someone living alone who was 65 years of age or older. The average household size was 2.05 and the average family size was 3.08.

The median age in the village was 49.8 years. 19.1% of residents were under the age of 18; 6.1% were between the ages of 18 and 24; 21.8% were from 25 to 44; 33.9% were from 45 to 64; and 19.1% were 65 years of age or older. The gender makeup of the village was 47.8% male and 52.2% female.

=== 2000 census ===
As of the census of 2000, there were 165 people, 70 households, and 38 families residing in the village. The population density was 2,128.6 inhabitants per square mile (821.9/km^{2}). There were 84 housing units at an average density of 1,083.7 per square mile (418.4/km^{2}). The racial makeup of the village was 3.64% White and 96.36% African American.

There were 70 households, out of which 24.3% had children under the age of 18 living with them, 18.6% were married couples living together, 25.7% had a female householder with no husband present, and 44.3% were non-families. 34.3% of all households were made up of individuals, and 11.4% had someone living alone who was 65 years of age or older. The average household size was 2.36 and the average family size was 2.95.

In the village, the population was spread out, with 26.1% under the age of 18, 4.2% from 18 to 24, 27.9% from 25 to 44, 24.8% from 45 to 64, and 17.0% who were 65 years of age or older. The median age was 40 years. For every 100 females, there were 87.5 males. For every 100 females age 18 and over, there were 74.3 males.

The median income for a household in the village was $15,417, and the median income for a family was $23,750. Males had a median income of $35,417 versus $23,000 for females. The per capita income for the village was $11,068. About 37.5% of families and 39.5% of the population were below the poverty line, including 28.8% of those under the age of eighteen and 71.0% of those 65 or over.

== Education ==
It is in the Charleston R-I School District.

== Notable people ==
- Romona Robinson (born 1959), Cleveland television news anchor
