= Pull Tight =

Pull Tight or Pulltight may refer to:

- Pull Tight, Alabama
- Pulltight, Missouri
- Pulltight, Indiana
