= Samos, Missouri =

Unincorporated community in Missouri, United States

Coordinates: 36°52′05″N 89°16′35″W

Samos is an unincorporated community in Mississippi County, in the U.S. state of Missouri. The community was at the intersection of County roads 326 and 321 approximately 4.5 miles southeast of Charleston and 3.5 miles southwest of Wyatt. It was on the St. Louis Southwestern Railway line.

== History ==
A post office called Samos was established in 1884, and remained in operation until 1938. The name is a transfer from the island of Samos, in Greece.
