= Crosno, Missouri =

Extinct hamlet in Missouri, U.S.

Coordinates: 36°47′51″N 89°10′38″W

Crosno is a ghost town in Mississippi County, in the U.S. state of Missouri. The GNIS classifies it as a populated place.

== History ==
Permanent settlement occurred on the site as early as 1802; it formerly was called "Lucas Bend". A post office called Crosno was established in 1890, and remained in operation until 1934. F. M. Crosno, an early postmaster, gave the community his last name.

Crosno lends its name to the Crosno Fortified Village Archeological Site, a Native American archaeological site listed on the National Register of Historical Places in 1969.
