= Rushs Ridge, Missouri =

Extinct town in Missouri, US

Coordinates: 36°55′44″N 89°10′45″W

Rushs Ridge is an extinct town in Mississippi County, in the U.S. state of Missouri. The GNIS classifies it as a populated place.

== History ==
A post office called Rush Ridge was established in 1858, and remained in operation until 1861. The community has the name of William Rush, a first settler. Rush Ridge once had a church and schoolhouse. A cemetery marks the site.
