= Moore House (Charleston, Missouri) =

Historic house in Missouri, United States

- U.S. National Register of Historic Places
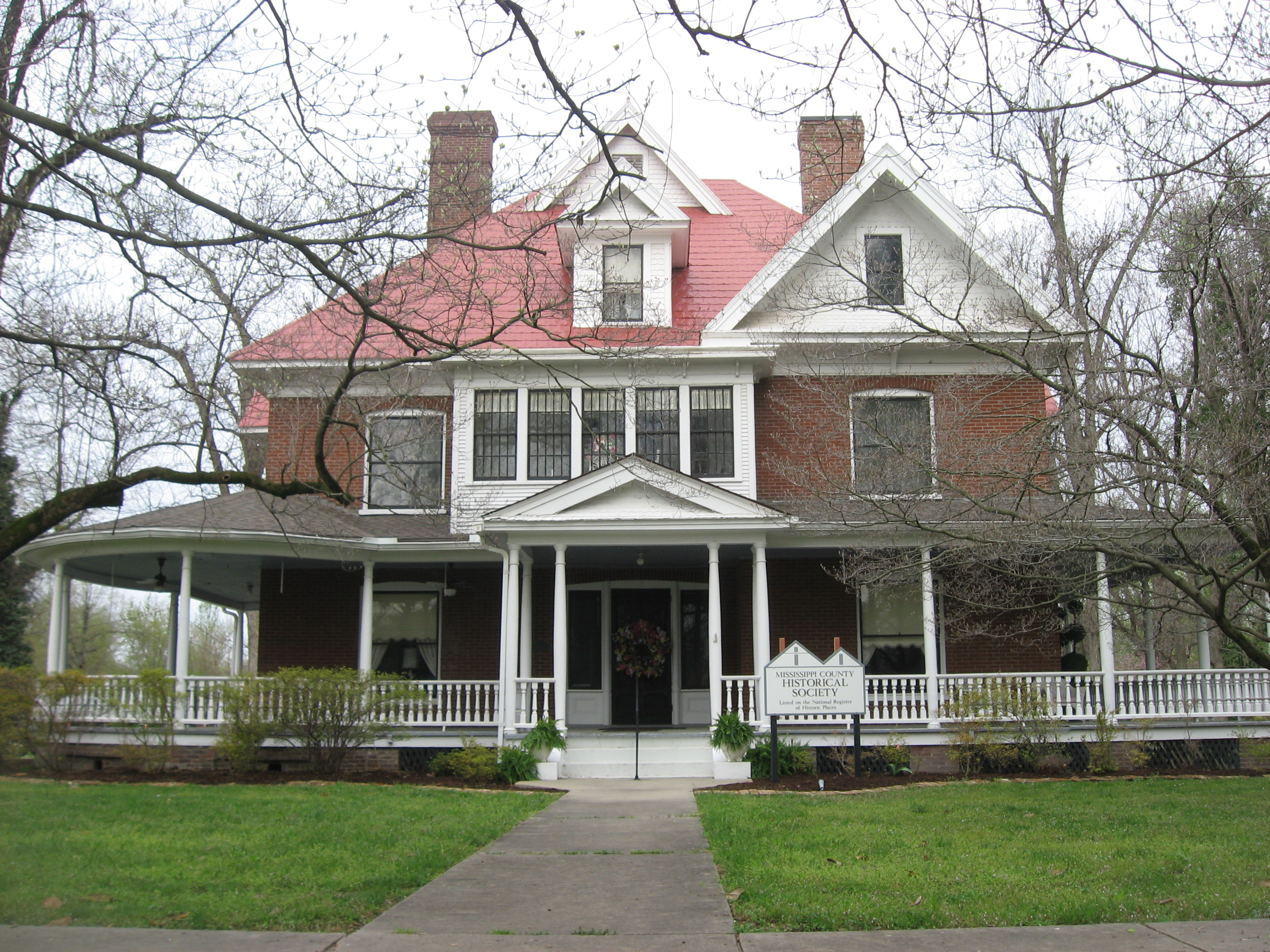
- Moore House, April 2013

- Location within Missouri Location within the United States
- Location: 403 N. Main St., Charleston, Missouri
- Coordinates: 36°55′22″N 89°21′0″W
- Area: 0.8 acres (0.32 ha)
- Built: 1899-1900
- Architect: Legg, Jerome Bibb
- Architectural style: Colonial Revival
- NRHP reference No.: 80002380
- Added to NRHP: September 18, 1980

Moore House, also known as the James Handy and Mary Hunter Moore House, is a historic home located at Charleston, Mississippi County, Missouri. It was built in 1899–1900, and is a 2 1/2-story, Colonial Revival style red brick dwelling. It measures approximately 65 feet by 47 feet and is topped by a hipped roof with gables. The front facade features a columned and balustraded veranda, with pedimented entry. The building houses the Mississippi County Historical Society.

It was added to the National Register of Historic Places in 1980.
