= Texas Bend, Missouri =

Unincorporated community in Missouri, United States

Coordinates: 36°58′48″N 89°21′23″W

Texas Bend is an unincorporated community in Mississippi County, in the U.S. state of Missouri.

Texas Bend had its start in the 1840s, and most likely was named after a nearby meander on the Mississippi River, which in turned was so named as an allusion to the size of Texas.
