= Jacob Swank House =

Historic house in Missouri, United States

- U.S. National Register of Historic Places
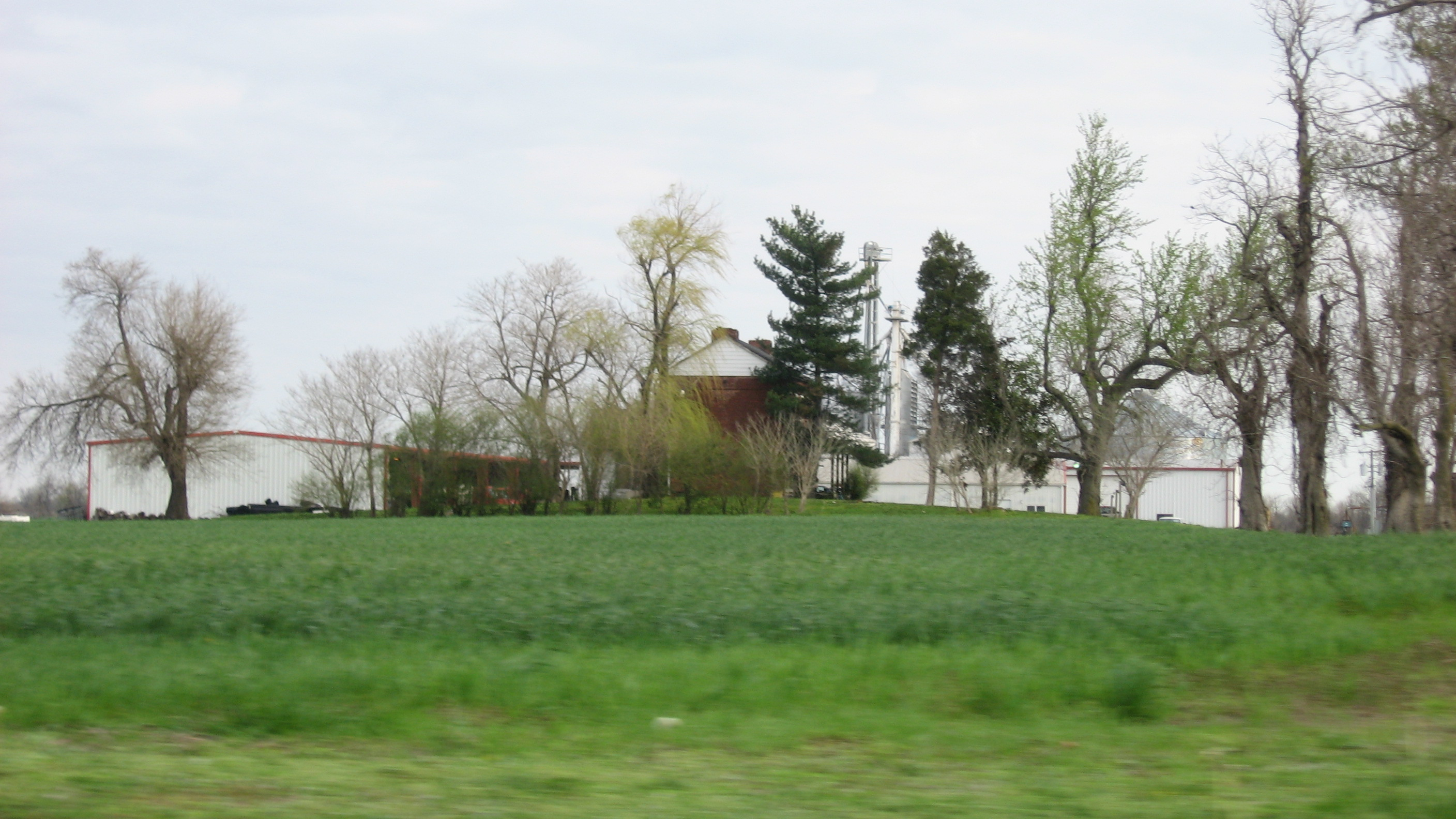
- Jacob Swank House, April 2013

- Location within Missouri Location within the United States
- Location: 0.2 miles west of Charleston on U.S. Routes 60 and 62, near Charleston, Missouri
- Coordinates: 36°55′19″N 89°22′15″W
- Area: 9.9 acres (4.0 ha)
- Built: 1839
- Architectural style: Classic Revival
- NRHP reference No.: 73001048
- Added to NRHP: April 13, 1973

Jacob Swank House is a historic home located near Charleston, Mississippi County, Missouri. It was built in 1839, and is a two-story, five-bay, L-plan, Classic Revival style orange-red brick dwelling. It measures approximately 40 feet, 6 inches, by 36 feet, 9 inches, and is topped by a simple ridge roof. The front facade features a three-bay hip roofed front porch.

It was added to the National Register of Historic Places in 1973.
