= 1972 United States presidential election in Missouri =

- November 7, 1972

Nominee	Richard Nixon	George McGovern
Party	Republican	Democratic
Home state	California	South Dakota
Running mate	Spiro Agnew	Sargent Shriver
Electoral vote	12	0
Popular vote	1,154,058	698,531
Percentage	62.29%	37.71%
County results
Nixon
50–60%
60–70%
70–80%
80–90%
McGovern
50–60%
60–70%
President before election
Richard Nixon
Republican
Elected President
Richard Nixon
Republican

The 1972 United States presidential election in Missouri took place on November 7, 1972. All fifty states and the District of Columbia were part of the 1972 United States presidential election. Voters chose 12 electors to the Electoral College, who voted for president and vice president.

Missouri was won by the Republican nominees, incumbent President Richard Nixon of California and his running mate Vice President Spiro Agnew of Maryland. Nixon and Agnew defeated the Democratic nominees, Senator George McGovern of South Dakota and his running mate U.S. Ambassador Sargent Shriver of Maryland.

In a state substantially part of the conservative South, McGovern was viewed by many voters as a left-wing extremist because of his support for busing and civil rights, plus his opposition to the Vietnam War, support for granting amnesty to draft dodgers and support for a thousand-dollar giveaway to each American as a solution to poverty. Many, especially Republican campaigners, also believed McGovern would legalise abortion and illicit drugs if he were elected – despite the fact that his running mate Sargent Shriver was firmly opposed to abortion. These fears of McGovern's social radicalism were especially pronounced amongst poorer whites, who were abundant in the southern part of Missouri.

Nixon carried Missouri with 62.29% of the vote to McGovern's 37.71%, a victory margin of 24.58%, becoming the first Republican to ever carry Missouri more than once. Nixon won all but two jurisdictions: Monroe County and St. Louis City.

As of the 2024 presidential election, this is the last election in which Jackson County, which contains most of Kansas City, as well as Independence, the hometown of former Democratic president Harry S. Truman (who died seven weeks after the election), voted for a Republican presidential candidate.

== Results ==
General election results
Party	Candidate	Votes	%
Republican	Richard Nixon (incumbent)	1,154,058	62.29%
Democratic	George McGovern	698,531	37.71%
Total votes		1,852,589	100%

=== Results by county ===
County	Richard Nixon Republican		George McGovern Democratic		Margin		Total votes cast
County	#	%	#	%	#	%	Total votes cast
Adair	6,157	72.92%	2,286	27.08%	3,871	45.84%	8,443
Andrew	4,180	71.26%	1,686	28.74%	2,494	42.52%	5,866
Atchison	2,927	65.98%	1,509	34.02%	1,418	31.96%	4,436
Audrain	7,197	66.01%	3,706	33.99%	3,491	32.02%	10,903
Barry	7,295	69.73%	3,167	30.27%	4,128	39.46%	10,462
Barton	4,026	77.93%	1,140	22.07%	2,886	55.86%	5,166
Bates	5,314	63.76%	3,020	36.24%	2,294	27.52%	8,334
Benton	3,537	71.31%	1,423	28.69%	2,114	42.62%	4,960
Bollinger	3,069	62.80%	1,818	37.20%	1,251	25.60%	4,887
Boone	17,488	56.13%	13,666	43.87%	3,822	12.26%	31,154
Buchanan	21,850	65.72%	11,395	34.28%	10,455	31.44%	33,245
Butler	9,198	72.63%	3,466	27.37%	5,732	45.26%	12,664
Caldwell	3,167	72.01%	1,231	27.99%	1,936	44.02%	4,398
Callaway	6,313	67.53%	3,036	32.47%	3,277	35.06%	9,349
Camden	4,996	73.94%	1,761	26.06%	3,235	47.88%	6,757
Cape Girardeau	15,693	71.42%	6,280	28.58%	9,413	42.84%	21,973
Carroll	4,100	68.03%	1,927	31.97%	2,173	36.06%	6,027
Carter	1,257	68.99%	565	31.01%	692	37.98%	1,822
Cass	9,242	71.24%	3,731	28.76%	5,511	42.48%	12,973
Cedar	3,520	75.34%	1,152	24.66%	2,368	50.68%	4,672
Chariton	2,812	58.45%	1,999	41.55%	813	16.90%	4,811
Christian	6,305	76.42%	1,945	23.58%	4,360	52.84%	8,250
Clark	2,499	64.04%	1,403	35.96%	1,096	28.08%	3,902
Clay	33,017	69.43%	14,538	30.57%	18,479	38.86%	47,555
Clinton	3,924	66.87%	1,944	33.13%	1,980	33.74%	5,868
Cole	16,685	77.83%	4,754	22.17%	11,931	55.66%	21,439
Cooper	5,172	68.92%	2,332	31.08%	2,840	37.84%	7,504
Crawford	4,595	67.15%	2,248	32.85%	2,347	34.30%	6,843
Dade	2,624	77.84%	747	22.16%	1,877	55.68%	3,371
Dallas	3,120	74.20%	1,085	25.80%	2,035	48.40%	4,205
Daviess	2,840	66.51%	1,430	33.49%	1,410	33.02%	4,270
DeKalb	2,766	67.38%	1,339	32.62%	1,427	34.76%	4,105
Dent	3,024	63.88%	1,710	36.12%	1,314	27.76%	4,734
Douglas	3,773	75.73%	1,209	24.27%	2,564	51.46%	4,982
Dunklin	5,926	68.10%	2,776	31.90%	3,150	36.20%	8,702
Franklin	13,785	64.87%	7,464	35.13%	6,321	29.74%	21,249
Gasconade	4,944	80.13%	1,226	19.87%	3,718	60.26%	6,170
Gentry	2,984	64.50%	1,642	35.50%	1,342	29.00%	4,626
Greene	48,348	70.58%	20,155	29.42%	28,193	41.16%	68,503
Grundy	3,969	73.54%	1,428	26.46%	2,541	47.08%	5,397
Harrison	3,574	72.10%	1,383	27.90%	2,191	44.20%	4,957
Henry	5,802	64.99%	3,125	35.01%	2,677	29.98%	8,927
Hickory	1,851	74.85%	622	25.15%	1,229	49.70%	2,473
Holt	2,578	71.83%	1,011	28.17%	1,567	43.66%	3,589
Howard	2,613	56.15%	2,041	43.85%	572	12.30%	4,654
Howell	7,253	72.18%	2,795	27.82%	4,458	44.36%	10,048
Iron	2,203	62.07%	1,346	37.93%	857	24.14%	3,549
Jackson	129,989	58.34%	92,830	41.66%	37,159	16.68%	222,819
Jasper	22,482	74.61%	7,652	25.39%	14,830	49.22%	30,134
Jefferson	21,947	61.42%	13,787	38.58%	8,160	22.84%	35,734
Johnson	7,228	70.37%	3,044	29.63%	4,184	40.74%	10,272
Knox	1,896	64.78%	1,031	35.22%	865	29.56%	2,927
Laclede	6,152	73.78%	2,186	26.22%	3,966	47.56%	8,338
Lafayette	9,187	69.34%	4,063	30.66%	5,124	38.68%	13,250
Lawrence	8,445	72.96%	3,130	27.04%	5,315	45.92%	11,575
Lewis	2,738	61.76%	1,695	38.24%	1,043	23.52%	4,433
Lincoln	5,127	64.81%	2,784	35.19%	2,343	29.62%	7,911
Linn	4,595	59.92%	3,073	40.08%	1,522	19.84%	7,668
Livingston	5,253	66.37%	2,662	33.63%	2,591	32.74%	7,915
Macon	4,538	61.47%	2,844	38.53%	1,694	22.94%	7,382
Madison	2,837	66.16%	1,451	33.84%	1,386	32.32%	4,288
Maries	2,082	63.07%	1,219	36.93%	863	26.14%	3,301
Marion	7,197	63.31%	4,171	36.69%	3,026	26.62%	11,368
McDonald	4,339	70.83%	1,787	29.17%	2,552	41.66%	6,126
Mercer	1,592	72.40%	607	27.60%	985	44.80%	2,199
Miller	5,682	78.05%	1,598	21.95%	4,084	56.10%	7,280
Mississippi	2,727	64.97%	1,470	35.03%	1,257	29.94%	4,197
Moniteau	3,963	73.96%	1,395	26.04%	2,568	47.92%	5,358
Monroe	2,141	48.22%	2,299	51.78%	−158	−3.56%	4,440
Montgomery	3,707	68.67%	1,691	31.33%	2,016	37.34%	5,398
Morgan	4,021	70.47%	1,685	29.53%	2,336	40.94%	5,706
New Madrid	4,735	57.50%	3,500	42.50%	1,235	15.00%	8,235
Newton	10,701	71.38%	4,291	28.62%	6,410	42.76%	14,992
Nodaway	5,942	64.14%	3,322	35.86%	2,620	28.28%	9,264
Oregon	2,118	61.04%	1,352	38.96%	766	22.08%	3,470
Osage	4,266	74.18%	1,485	25.82%	2,781	48.36%	5,751
Ozark	2,119	77.22%	625	22.78%	1,494	54.44%	2,744
Pemiscot	4,697	69.96%	2,017	30.04%	2,680	39.92%	6,714
Perry	4,736	70.80%	1,953	29.20%	2,783	41.60%	6,689
Pettis	10,065	66.74%	5,016	33.26%	5,049	33.48%	15,081
Phelps	7,598	68.05%	3,567	31.95%	4,031	36.10%	11,165
Pike	4,452	62.61%	2,659	37.39%	1,793	25.22%	7,111
Platte	8,764	67.69%	4,183	32.31%	4,581	35.38%	12,947
Polk	5,409	70.67%	2,245	29.33%	3,164	41.34%	7,654
Pulaski	4,243	69.04%	1,903	30.96%	2,340	38.08%	6,146
Putnam	2,112	78.72%	571	21.28%	1,541	57.44%	2,683
Ralls	1,827	57.13%	1,371	42.87%	456	14.26%	3,198
Randolph	5,195	57.66%	3,814	42.34%	1,381	15.32%	9,009
Ray	4,205	59.65%	2,844	40.35%	1,361	19.30%	7,049
Reynolds	1,541	59.91%	1,031	40.09%	510	19.82%	2,572
Ripley	2,810	67.37%	1,361	32.63%	1,449	34.74%	4,171
St. Charles	25,677	69.94%	11,034	30.06%	14,643	39.88%	36,711
St. Clair	2,847	66.88%	1,410	33.12%	1,437	33.76%	4,257
St. Francois	8,812	65.42%	4,658	34.58%	4,154	30.84%	13,470
St. Louis	264,147	62.16%	160,801	37.84%	103,346	24.32%	424,948
St. Louis City	72,402	37.67%	119,817	62.33%	−47,415	−24.66%	192,219
Ste. Genevieve	2,900	56.34%	2,247	43.66%	653	12.68%	5,147
Saline	6,641	65.75%	3,460	34.25%	3,181	31.50%	10,101
Schuyler	1,495	60.14%	991	39.86%	504	20.28%	2,486
Scotland	1,918	60.18%	1,269	39.82%	649	20.36%	3,187
Scott	7,316	66.74%	3,646	33.26%	3,670	33.48%	10,962
Shannon	1,623	58.87%	1,134	41.13%	489	17.74%	2,757
Shelby	2,057	56.73%	1,569	43.27%	488	13.46%	3,626
Stoddard	6,282	70.44%	2,636	29.56%	3,646	40.88%	8,918
Stone	4,180	79.26%	1,094	20.74%	3,086	58.52%	5,274
Sullivan	2,611	62.18%	1,588	37.82%	1,023	24.36%	4,199
Taney	4,982	77.64%	1,435	22.36%	3,547	55.28%	6,417
Texas	5,104	65.09%	2,737	34.91%	2,367	30.18%	7,841
Vernon	4,892	61.54%	3,057	38.46%	1,835	23.08%	7,949
Warren	3,530	74.24%	1,225	25.76%	2,305	48.48%	4,755
Washington	3,818	63.14%	2,229	36.86%	1,589	26.28%	6,047
Wayne	3,091	63.90%	1,746	36.10%	1,345	27.80%	4,837
Webster	5,095	68.50%	2,343	31.50%	2,752	37.00%	7,438
Worth	1,170	61.68%	727	38.32%	443	23.36%	1,897
Wright	4,350	76.08%	1,368	23.92%	2,982	52.16%	5,718
Totals	1,154,058	62.29%	698,531	37.71%	455,527	24.58%	1,852,589

== See also ==
- United States presidential elections in Missouri
