= Buckeye, Missouri =

Unincorporated community in Missouri, United States

Coordinates: 36°54′16″N 89°29′33″W

Buckeye is an unincorporated community in Mississippi County in the U.S. state of Missouri.

== History ==
The community was also known as Bement. A post office called Buckeye was established in 1895, and remained in operation until 1919. Buckeye was named for a grove of buckeye trees near the original town site.
