= Samuel "Bay" Taylor =

African-American baseball player

Samuel Taylor
- Catcher
- Born: January 27, 1929; Charleston, Missouri
- Died: April 8, 2019 (aged 90); St. Louis, Missouri
- Batted: Right Threw: Right

Negro league baseball debut
- 1952, for the Kansas City Monarchs

Last appearance
- 1954, for the Indianapolis Clowns

Teams
- Kansas City Monarchs (1952–54); Indianapolis Clowns (1954)

Samuel "Bay" Taylor (January 27, 1929 – April 8, 2019) was an American catcher and left fielder who played in the Negro leagues. Listed at 5' 6" [1.68 m], 195 lb. [88 k], he batted and threw right handed.

Born in Charleston, Missouri, Taylor started his baseball career in East St. Louis, Illinois while playing for the local East St. Louis White Sox. He later played for several East St. Louis teams before joining the legendary Kansas City Monarchs of the Negro American League from 1952 through most of 1954 under manager Buck O'Neil. Afterwards, Taylor played with the Indianapolis Clowns late in 1954.

In an interview, Taylor explained that he patterned his playing style from his idol, Brooklyn Dodgers catcher Roy Campanella.

Unfortunately, there are not statistics for the Negro leagues in the post-integration era. Taylor enjoyed his best season when he hit a .325 batting average with 25 home runs and 51 RBI for a St. Louis team called the Midgets, according to his estimation.

In 2018, Taylor was invited to throw the ceremonial first pitch in a game of the St. Louis Cardinals at Busch Stadium.

Taylor died in 2019 in St. Louis, Missouri at the age of 90.
