= Dogwood, Mississippi County, Missouri =

Unincorporated community in Missouri, United States

Coordinates: 36°49′31″N 89°27′13″W

Dogwood is an unincorporated community in Mississippi County, in the U.S. state of Missouri.

== History ==
A variant name was "Sands". A post office called Sands was established in 1902, and remained in operation until 1908. Besides the post office, the community contained the Dogwood School. The community derives its present name from a grove of dogwood trees which stood near the schoolhouse.
