= Unexplained Mysteries =

American documentary television series

- Genre: Documentary
- Narrated by: Jonathan David Cook
- Theme music composer: Mike Greene
- Composer: Roy Campanella III
- Country of origin: United States
- Original language: English
- No. of seasons: 1
- No. of episodes: 26

Production
- Executive producers: Bradley Anderson; Mack Anderson; Ann Daniel; Jack Walworth; Henry Winkler
- Producer: Jerry Decker
- Editors: Marc Elmer; Chris Peacock; Alyssa Dressman; Lori Grossman
- Production company: Paramount Domestic Television

Original release
- Network: Syndication
- Release: September 20, 2003 – May 29, 2004

Unexplained Mysteries is an American documentary television series that originally aired in syndication from 2003 to 2004 for a single season. The show covers eyewitness accounts of paranormal activity, especially aliens, UFOs, and ghosts; almost all of them were reworked reports from the series Sightings and Paranormal Borderline.

== Production ==
Hosted by Jonathan David Cook, Unexplained Mysteries is a syndicated show with a one-hour runtime. Paramount Domestic Television produced the show. In addition to creating original footage for each Unexplained Mysteries episode, Paramount included numerous clips from Sightings, a show that had premiered on Fox in April 1992 and was syndicated between September 1994 and September 1996.

The program had 97% national coverage via 217 markets in 2003. John Nogawski, the president of Paramount Domestic Television, said in 2003 that the show was profitable. Nielsen Media Research stated that on October 26, 2003, the show had a 1.5 "national household rating". In 2004, Paramount renewed the program for its second season with a distribution reaching 80% of national markets. Unexplained Mysteries was syndicated between September 2003 and May 2004.

== Episode guide ==
Ep #	Prod #	Air date	Episode title
1	25	20 Sep 2003	"Paranormal America"
2	10	27 Sep 2003	"Psychic Crime-Solvers"
3	8	4 Oct 2003	"America's Most Haunted"
4	20	11 Oct 2003	"This Strange Planet"
5	15	18 Oct 2003	"Contact with the Other Side"
6	1	25 Oct 2003	"The Truth About Signs"
7		1 Nov 2003	"When Ghosts Attack"
8	26	8 Nov 2003	"The Unreal World"
9	6	15 Nov 2003	"Taken: The Abduction Phenomena"
10		22 Nov 2003	"Bizarre Beliefs"
11	17	29 Nov 2003	"Scariest Places on Earth"
12	16	27 Dec 2003	"Miracles on Earth"
13	13	3 Jan 2004	"Psychic Healers"
14		17 Jan 2004	"Undercover UFO"
15		31 Jan 2004	"Global UFO Warning"
16	19	7 Feb 2004	"Extreme Psychics"
17		14 Feb 2004	"Target: Earth"
18		21 Feb 2004	"The Young and the Haunted"
19	24	28 Feb 2004	"The Monster Show"
20	14	6 Mar 2004	"The Angel Files"
21		24 Apr 2004	"Real People, Real UFOs"
22	7	1 May 2004	"UFO Best Evidence"
23	11	8 May 2004	"Touched by an Alien"
24	4	15 May 2004	"Extreme Hauntings"
25	12	22 May 2004	"Destination: Earth"
26	18	29 May 2004	"Dead and Back Again"

== See also ==
- Sightings (TV series)
- Encounters (TV series)
- Peter C. Byrne
