= Romona Robinson =

American journalist

- Born: 1969 (age 56–57); Wilson City, Missouri
- Occupation: Television news anchor
- Years active: 1981–2018
- Spouse: Rodney Tyler
- Mother: Henrietta Robinson
- Awards: Eight-time Lower Great Lakes Emmy Awards winner 2014 Edward R. Murrow Award; Ohio Broadcasters Hall of Fame; Cleveland Broadcasters Association Hall of Fame

Romona Robinson (born 1969) is an American television news anchor in Cleveland, Ohio. She is the first African American woman to anchor a nightly newscast in Cleveland, and the first solo anchor of a weeknight newscast in that city. She is a member of the Ohio Broadcasters Hall of Fame and the Cleveland Association of Broadcasters Hall of Fame, and is an eight-time recipient of the Lower Great Lakes Emmy Awards. She is currently retired, having appeared weeknights on Cleveland TV newscasts for 30 years - first on then independent station (now CW affiliate WUAB channel 43 (1988-1997), later on NBC affiliate WKYC channel 3 (1997-2011), and finally on CBS affiliate WOIO Channel 19 (2012-2018).

== Early life and education ==
Robinson was born in 1959 in Wilson City, Missouri. She was one of 10 girls and one boy in her family. Her mother, Henrietta Robinson, was a seamstress and maintained a small farm behind their house. Romona earned a bachelor's degree in broadcast journalism at Lincoln University in Jefferson City, Missouri.

== Career ==
Robinson entered the broadcasting field in 1981 as a record player at a country-western music station in Jefferson City, Missouri. In 1982 she joined a television station as a sports reporter and weekend news anchor. In 1985 she moved to Charleston, South Carolina, to take up a television news anchor position.

In 1987 she applied for a news anchor position at the new 10 O'Clock News newscast at WUAB in Cleveland, Ohio. Her demo tape included "a shot of her being wiped out by a hurricane-whipped wave", which impressed the producers due to her poise and self-confidence. Her appointment made her the first African-American woman to anchor a nightly newscast in Cleveland. In 1990 she introduced a segment called "Romona's Kids", spotlighting children doing positive work for their communities, which she continues to host at WKYC.

Robinson remained at WUAB until 1997, when the station changed ownership. She left WUAB in February 1997 without another position lined up, and was hired in March by Cleveland NBC affiliate WKYC Channel 3. Per her contract with WUAB, she was assigned to "special projects" for five months and then began anchoring and reporting on air in September 1997. From 1999 to 2008 she co-anchored with Tim White, but when WKYC opted not to renew White's contract, Robinson became solo anchor of the evening newscasts on WKYC in late 2008, making her the first African American woman to be the solo anchor of a weeknight newscast in Cleveland. In 2011 she was one of four reporters invited to the White House for one-on-one interviews with President Barack Obama.

When her contract expired on December 16, 2011, Robinson ended her 15-year affiliation with Channel 3. In January 2012 she signed with CBS affiliate WOIO channel 19 as their afternoon and evening anchor. Robinson left WOIO at the end of 2018.

== Other activities ==
Robinson has been the Honorary Chair for the Susan G. Komen Race for the Cure since 1996. She is active in numerous communal and charity organizations, including the Diversity Center of Northeast Ohio, Coats for Kids and Shoes for Kids, and United Way.

She appeared in a cameo role playing a reporter in a first-season episode of the ABC television series The Commish, which aired on March 21, 1992.

== Honors and awards ==
Robinson was inducted into the Ohio Broadcasters Hall of Fame and the Cleveland Association of Broadcasters Hall of Fame. She is an eight-time recipient of the Lower Great Lakes Emmy Award and received the 2014 Edward R. Murrow Award, together with co-anchor Denise Dufala, for breaking news coverage in reporting on the Ariel Castro kidnappings in Cleveland.

She also received the 2008 Kent State University Diversity in Media Distinguished Leadership Award and the 2011 Woman of Achievement Award from the YWCA of Greater Cleveland.

== Personal ==
Robinson married Rodney Tyler, a technology consultant and father of two, in 2004. She and her husband are members of the Mount Zion Church in Oakwood Village, Ohio, where Robinson is often asked to say inspirational words from the pulpit.

== Bibliography ==
- Robinson, Romona (2017). A Dirt Road to Somewhere. Halo Publishing International. ISBN 978-1612445601.
