= Henson, Missouri =

Unincorporated community in Missouri, United States

Coordinates: 36°51′22″N 89°15′09″W

Henson is an unincorporated community in Mississippi County, in the U.S. state of Missouri.

== History ==
A post office called Henson was established in 1877, and remained in operation until 1938. The community has the name of Jim Henson, a pioneer citizen.
