= Sightings (TV series) =

Television series

- Genre: Paranormal; News
- Presented by: Tim White
- Theme music composer: Bill Bodine
- Composers: Christopher L. Stone; Michael Tavera; Alan Ett
- Country of origin: United States
- Original language: English
- No. of seasons: 5
- No. of episodes: 114 (list of episodes)

Production
- Running time: 30 minutes (seasons 1–2, 1996 behind the scenes special); 60 minutes (seasons 3–5, 1991–92 specials, 1996 home videos); 120 minutes (1998 In Depth and Beyond specials)
- Production companies: Winkler/Daniel Productions (1991–93) (seasons 1–2, 60-minute specials); The Berkeley Group (1991–92, specials only); Paramount Network Television (1991–92) (60-minute specials); Sather Gate Productions (1992–93) (season 2); Wilshire Court Productions (1992–93) (season 2); Ann Daniel Productions (1994–98) (seasons 4–5, 120-minute specials); Fair Dinkum Productions (1994–98) (seasons 4–5, 120-minute specials); Triage Entertainment (1996–98, season 5, 120-minute specials); Paramount Domestic Television (1994–1998)

Original release
- Network: Fox
- Release: October 17, 1991 – May 21, 1993
- Network: First-run syndication
- Release: September 11, 1994 – May 12, 1996
- Network: Sci-Fi Channel
- Release: September 19, 1996 – December 23, 1998
- Network: Showtime
- Release: October 27, 2002

Related
- Danger in Our Skies: The New UFO Threat; Sightings: Heartland Ghost; Unexplained Mysteries

Sightings is an American paranormal and news television show that first aired in the 1990s. The show began on October 17, 1991, as a special titled The UFO Report: Sightings. Two follow-up reports were subsequently aired, Ghost Report and Psychic Experience. The creator and supervising producer of the initial episode, produced by Paramount for Fox Television, was Linda Moulton Howe. One of her episodes was A Strange Harvest, about the worldwide mystery of animal mutilations, often speculated by ufologists to have an extraterrestrial cause.

== Show history ==
After the special broadcast was met with high ratings, it went forward into weekly TV production as the program Sightings. The show featured everything from UFOs to ghosts to Bigfoot in an investigative news format and was hosted by reporter Tim White. The show was created by Ann Daniel Productions, Fair Dinkum Productions (Winkler-Daniel Productions from 1991 to 1993), and Paramount Domestic Television (Wilshire Court Productions from 1992 to 1993). Its executive producers were Henry Winkler and Ann Daniel.

The program began on Fox in 1992, in a 30-minute-long format that aired on Friday nights. When the show was put into syndication in 1994, it was extended to an hour-long format and was on at various times. In 1996, it was picked up by the Sci-Fi Channel. Sightings was cancelled in 1997, although five special episodes aired in 1998, and reruns continued on the Sci-Fi Channel until April 2003.

In 1998, the producers made a new UFO special that aired on UPN, called Danger in Our Skies: The New UFO Threat, hosted by Jim Forbes.

In 2003, a program called Unexplained Mysteries debuted in syndication. Although it did not have the same hosted news format as Sightings, it was produced by many of the same individuals involved with the original production, and sometimes reused footage and graphics from the earlier program.

== Episodes ==
| Season | Episodes | Originally released | | |
| Season | Episodes | First released | Last released | Network |
|---|---|---|---|---|
| Fox specials | 3 | October 17, 1991 | April 24, 1992 | Fox |
| 1 | 11 | April 17, 1992 | August 21, 1992 | Fox |
| 2 | 24 | September 18, 1992 | May 21, 1993 | Fox |
| 3 | 26 | September 11, 1994 | May 21, 1995 | Syndication |
| 4 | 24 | September 10, 1995 | May 12, 1996 | Syndication |
| 5 | 20 | September 19, 1996 | September 11, 1997 | Sci-Fi Channel |
| Specials | 6 | September 20, 1996 | December 23, 1998 | Sci-Fi Channel |
| Film | | October 27, 2002 | | Showtime |

== Home media ==
There have been three home video releases of the Sightings television show: Sightings: The UFO Report, Sightings: The Ghost Report, and Sightings: The Psychic Experience. The videos were repackaged segments from seasons one and two of the television show. All three videos were originally released in 1996 on VHS tapes.

== Merchandise ==
- Two books were released in 1997 related to the Sightings television show, titled Sightings: Beyond Imagination Lies the Truth and Sightings: UFOs.
- One Sightings-related product was produced for home computers, titled Sightings: UFOPedia. The software included pictures, reports, footage, as well as never-before-seen footage from the show in an encyclopedic format.
- A line of clothing was released related to the Sightings television show that included T-shirts. The shirts would have either an alien, ghost, or psychic on the front with the word Sightings.
- Textile posters were sold related to the Sightings television show, made by Heart Rock S.r.l. in Italy. The posters were silk and featured the Sightings logo along with the illustrations that were on the VHS tape box covers (an alien, a ghost, or a psychic). The posters measured 75 x 110 cm.

== Sightings: Heartland Ghost ==
In 2002, one of the stories featured on Sightings became the subject of a television movie on the Showtime network, called Sightings: Heartland Ghost. The movie tells the story of a Sightings crew sent to investigate a poltergeist haunting, eventually becoming entangled in the phenomenon themselves. The movie was later released on DVD.

== See also ==
- Encounters (TV series)
