= Catalpa, Missouri =

Unincorporated community in Missouri, United States

Coordinates: 36°52′58″N 89°17′40″W

Catalpa is an unincorporated community in Mississippi County, in the U.S. state of Missouri.

The community was named for a grove of catalpa trees planted near the original town site.
