= Samus (disambiguation) =

Samos is a Greek island in the Aegean Sea.

Samus may also refer to:

- Samus Aran, the protagonist of Nintendo's Metroid video game series
- Samus (sponge), a genus of sea sponges
- Samus, the Dacian name of the Someș River
- Samus (rural locality), a rural locality in Tomsk Oblast, Russia
- Samus (poet) (≈183 BCE), Macedonian poet
- SAMUS: South African Music Studies, a peer-reviewed academic journal, and the official journal of the South African Society for Research in Music (SASRIM)
- Sammus (born 1986), rapper from Ithaca, New York
- Samus culture, an Early Bronze Age archaeological culture
