= USS Catalpa =

Two ships of the United States Navy have been named Catalpa.

- The first USS Catalpa (1864), was a screw tug, built in Brooklyn, New York, in 1864 as Conqueror.
- USS Catalpa (AN-10), was launched 22 February 1941 by the Commercial Iron Works.
