= Greek ship Samos =

Five ships of the Hellenic Navy have borne the name Samos (Σάμος), named after the island of Samos:

- Greek ship Samos (1834) (1834–before 1853), a mistico bought by the newly established Royal Hellenic Navy from Samos in 1834
- Greek torpedo boat Samos (1881) (1881–1912), a Yarrow-built torpedo boat
- Greek destroyer Samos (1915), a Medea-class destroyer ordered in Britain, entered service with the British Royal Navy as HMS Melpomene
- Greek landing ship Samos (L179) (1943–1977), an LST1-class landing ship
- Greek landing ship Samos (L174) (1994–present), a Jason-class tank landing ship
