= Sightings: Heartland Ghost =

2002 American television film

- Based on: Sightings (1993 TV series)
- Written by: Karen Clark
- Directed by: Brian Trenchard-Smith
- Starring: Beau Bridges; Nia Long; Miguel Ferrer; Gabriel Olds; Thea Gill; Matthew Currie Holmes; Rachel Hayward
- Music by: Peter Bernstein
- Country of origin: United States
- Original language: English

Production
- Producer: Roee Sharon
- Cinematography: Bert Dunk
- Editor: Stephen R. Myers
- Running time: 105 minutes

Original release
- Network: Showtime
- Release: October 27, 2002

Sightings: Heartland Ghost is a 2002 film that originally aired on Showtime based on the TV series Sightings and inspired by true events. The film was written by Phil Penningroth and directed by Brian Trenchard-Smith.

== Plot ==
A Kansas couple's claim that their Victorian house is haunted prompts a visit from the crew of "Sightings", a TV show exploring paranormal events. Nobody believes the couple's story - especially cynical producer Derek, but show psychic Allen begins feeling the presence of several entities, including a little girl.

== Cast ==
- Beau Bridges as Derek
- Nia Long as Lou
- Miguel Ferrer as Allen
- Gabriel Olds as Jeff
- Thea Gill as Pam
- Matthew Currie Holmes as Nolan
- Rachel Hayward as Jamie
- Trevor Roberts as Arnold

== Original segments ==
The following are the original Sightings episodes to feature the Heartland Ghost recurring segments.

No. overall	No. in season	Title	Original release date	Prod. code
42	1	"Sightings"	September 11, 1994	3001
Heartland Ghost, Gulf Breeze Encounters, A Sculptor's Gift, Black Holes.
43	2	"Sightings"	September 18, 1994	3002
Heartland Ghost Update, Shared Memory Abduction, Watching The Skies, Schoolroom Angel, Colorado Cattle Mutilations, Ancient Creatures.
49	8	"Sightings"	October 30, 1994	3008
U.F.O. Confrontation: Iran, Death In The Desert, Heartland Ghost Investigation, Gift Of Life, Heartland Ghost Investigation.
50	9	"Sightings"	November 6, 1994	3009
Heartland Ghost Investigation, Nessie, Height 611, To Swim With Dolphins.
57	16	"Sightings"	January 29, 1995	3016
Heartland Aftermath, Curses, Sprites And Blue Jets, Gaia's Revenge, Outback Abduction, Heartland Online.
64	23	"Sightings"	April 30, 1995	3023
My Past Life, Heartland Ghost, Clear Intent, Snake Church, Transformed By The Light.
103	10	"Sightings"	March 12, 1997	5062
The Heartland Ghost, Echo Missile Encounter, IN THE NEWS, Crop Circle Video Mystery, Healing With Music, Millennium Watch - Quatrain 72.

== Releases ==
The film aired on Showtime on October 27, 2002 and released on DVD on March 2, 2004.

== Reception ==
DVD Talk said, "I cannot imagine any horror-film fan getting anything worthwhile out of Sightings: Heartland Ghost."
