= Catalpa Farm =

- U.S. National Register of Historic Places
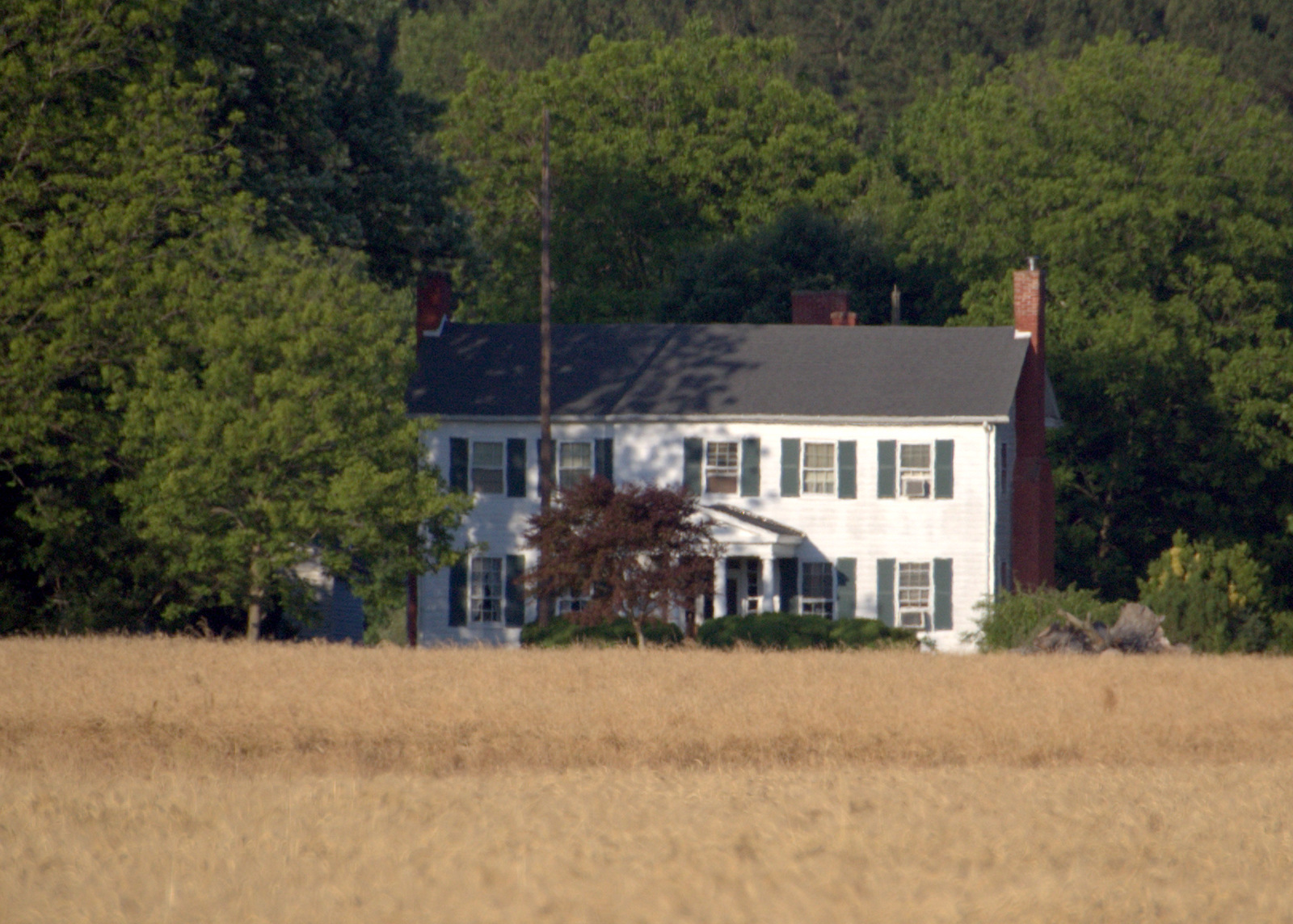

- Location within Maryland Location within the United States
- Location: Old Princess Anne Westover Road, Princess Anne, Maryland
- Coordinates: 38°11′9″N 75°40′46″W
- Area: 5.9 acres (2.4 ha)
- NRHP reference No.: 88002049
- Added to NRHP: November 10, 1988

The Catalpa Farm is a historic home and farm complex located at Princess Anne, Somerset County, Maryland, United States. It is a two-story, five-bay center passage structure built in two principal stages. The older section is a two-story, three-bay side-hall parlor house with service wing erected around 1825–1840. A two-story one-room plan frame addition was attached shortly thereafter. Also on the property are an early 19th-century dairy and smokehouse, a late 19th-century privy, a modern garage, a mid-19th-century corn crib, an early 20th-century gambrel-roofed barn, and an early 19th-century tobacco house.

The Catalpa Farm was listed on the National Register of Historic Places in 1988.
