= Tim White (newscaster) =

Journalist and United States Air Force general

- Born: Dale Timothy White; Detroit, Michigan, U.S.
- Occupation: Television news anchor
- Military career
- Allegiance: United States of America
- Branch: United States Air Force United States Air Force Reserves
- Service years: 1971–2006
- Rank: Brigadier general
- Commands: Air Force Doctrine Center; Director of Public Affairs, Office of the Secretary of the Air Force; Mobilization Assistant to Director of Strategic Communication
- Awards: Legion of Merit; Meritorious Service Medal; Air Force Commendation Medal

Tim White is an American news anchor and investigative reporter known for his role as host of the FOX-TV / Sci-Fi Channel / syndicated paranormal documentary series Sightings from 1992 to 1997. In 2002, White narrated the United States version of the Discovery Channel documentary program The Future Is Wild on the possible evolution of life on Earth. From 1999 to 2008, Tim was the co-anchor of the Evening News broadcasts for NBC Affiliate WKYC-TV, Channel 3 in Cleveland, Ohio.

== Biography ==
White, who was born Dale Timothy White in Detroit, and raised in Clare, Michigan, attended college at Michigan State University and the University of Southern California, and earned a doctorate in communications from the University of Maryland. He served in the Air Force Reserve, attaining the rank of brigadier general.

=== Accomplishments and awards ===
White's on-air television credits include WJZ-TV (Baltimore), WCVB-TV (Boston), and WTTG-TV (Washington, D.C.), where he won multiple Emmy Awards anchoring Fox Morning News. He has also hosted programs for PBS, CBS-TV, CNN, Turner Broadcasting, Knowledge TV, Paramount Pictures, and Worldnet. White joined WKYC-TV Channel 3, Gannett's NBC affiliate in Cleveland, Ohio in 1999. White is also inducted into the Ohio Radio and Television Broadcasters Hall of Fame.

On December 12, 2008, White opted to leave WKYC as a result of his contract not being renewed. The two parties could not come to an agreement on the financial terms of a new contract.

White is the president of Lives and Legacies Films, Inc. which has produced the PBS series First Person Singular, most notably a program on the life of Elie Wiesel. After managing his own news group company in Cody, Wyoming for the past few years, White currently resides in Arlington, Virginia.

== Career as Air Force Reserve general ==
White retired from the Air Force Reserve as a Brigadier General on August 14, 2006. White had also served as Director of Public Affairs, Office of the Secretary of the Air Force, the Pentagon, Washington, D.C., and Mobilization Assistant to Director of Strategic Communication.

=== Major achievements and decorations ===
- Legion of Merit
- Meritorious Service Medal with oak leaf clusters
- Air Force Commendation Medal
- Joint Service Commendation Medal

=== Effective dates of promotion ===
- Second lieutenant – June 9, 1971
- First lieutenant – May 15, 1973
- Captain – June 23, 1978
- Major – March 7, 1988
- Lieutenant colonel – June 15, 1992
- Colonel – September 1, 1996
- Brigadier general – August 14, 2001

| Preceded by Judd Hambrick (as WKYC News with Judd Hambrick and Donna Terrell), 1995-1999 | WKYC anchor with coanchor with Romona Robinson (as WKYC news with Tim White and Romona Robinson); 1999 – 2008 | Succeeded by Romona Robinson |
