= McCutchen Theatre =

Historical movie theater in Missouri

- U.S. National Register of Historic Places
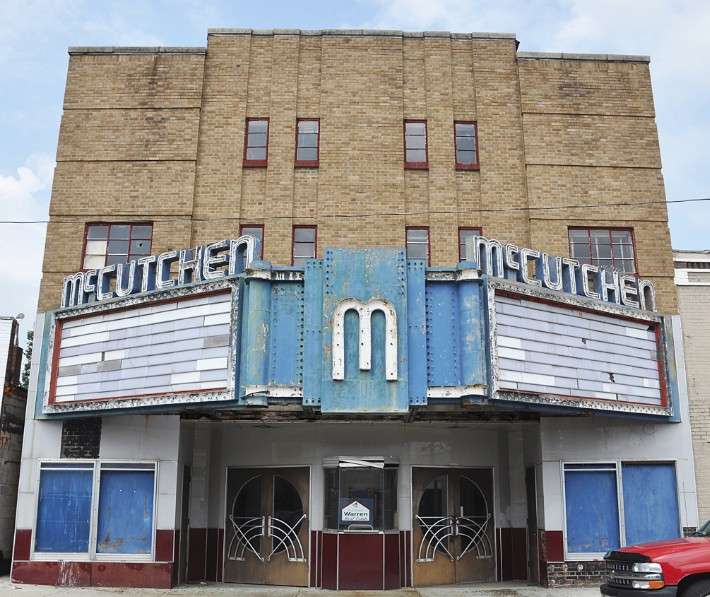

- Location within Missouri Location within the United States
- Location: 106 E. Commercial St., Charleston, Missouri
- Coordinates: 36.9234°N 89.3498°W
- Area: less than one acre
- Built: 1947-48
- NRHP reference No.: 100004271
- Added to NRHP: August 6, 2019

The McCutchen Theatre, in Charleston, Missouri, was built in 1947-48. It was listed on the National Register of Historic Places in 2019.

== Description ==
The McCutchen Theatre was opened on July 20, 1948. It is a three-story, brick-constructed, post-war Art Deco-style commercial building. It was built as a single-screen movie theater with a large illuminated neon and metal upper façade. The lower portion of the façade is covered with porcelain enamel and partially constructed from structural glass. The interior is designed in the Moderne or Streamline Moderne style. At the time of the NRHP nomination in 2019, the roof had collapsed over the main floor seating area.

The highly detailed lobby is elliptical in shape with curved plaster walls. The domed ceiling is surrounded by an ornate plaster cornice of stylized leaves. Curving staircases lead up to the balcony. The theater originally contained 648 seats on the main floor and 185 seats in the balcony. The original plush red leather seats with oak-finished armrests were built by the American Seating Company. All seats and lighting fixtures were removed before the nomination to NRHP.

The theater retains its Art Deco and Streamline Moderne integrity despite changes over the years, that is in keeping with other architectural structures in the downtown district. It is historically significant per NRHP Criterion A for Entertainment facilities and in Area C for Architecture. The Streamline Moderne style, developed from the Art Deco style of the 1930s. The style uses many of the same materials, however it emphasizes sleek, smooth forms due to the fact that there is less ornamentation and sharp angular components, and instead favors curved, flowing lines.

== Location ==
The Theater is located just off of Main Street in the downtown commercial district of Charleston. The district is distinguished with numerous mid-century modern buildings.
