= Catalpa Festival =

Music festival celebrated in NYC

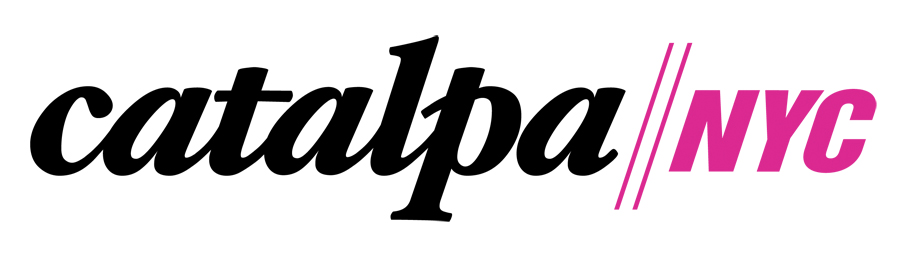
Catalpa Festival Logo

Catalpa Music Festival (commonly known as Catalpa, Catalpa Festival or Catalpa NYC) was a multi-day music and art festival held on Randalls Island, New York City. The event took place for the first and only time over the July 28th/29th weekend in 2012. The event featured many genres of music including Rock, Indie, Hip Hop, Electronic and Reggae music as well as many large sculptural art installations and interactive features such as a silent disco and Church of Sham Marriages.

Headlining artists for Catalpa's inaugural year were The Black Keys, Snoop Dogg performing Doggystyle, TV on the Radio, Umphrey's McGee, Girl Talk, Matt & Kim, Cold War Kids, ASAP Rocky, Matisyahu and Hercules and Love Affair.

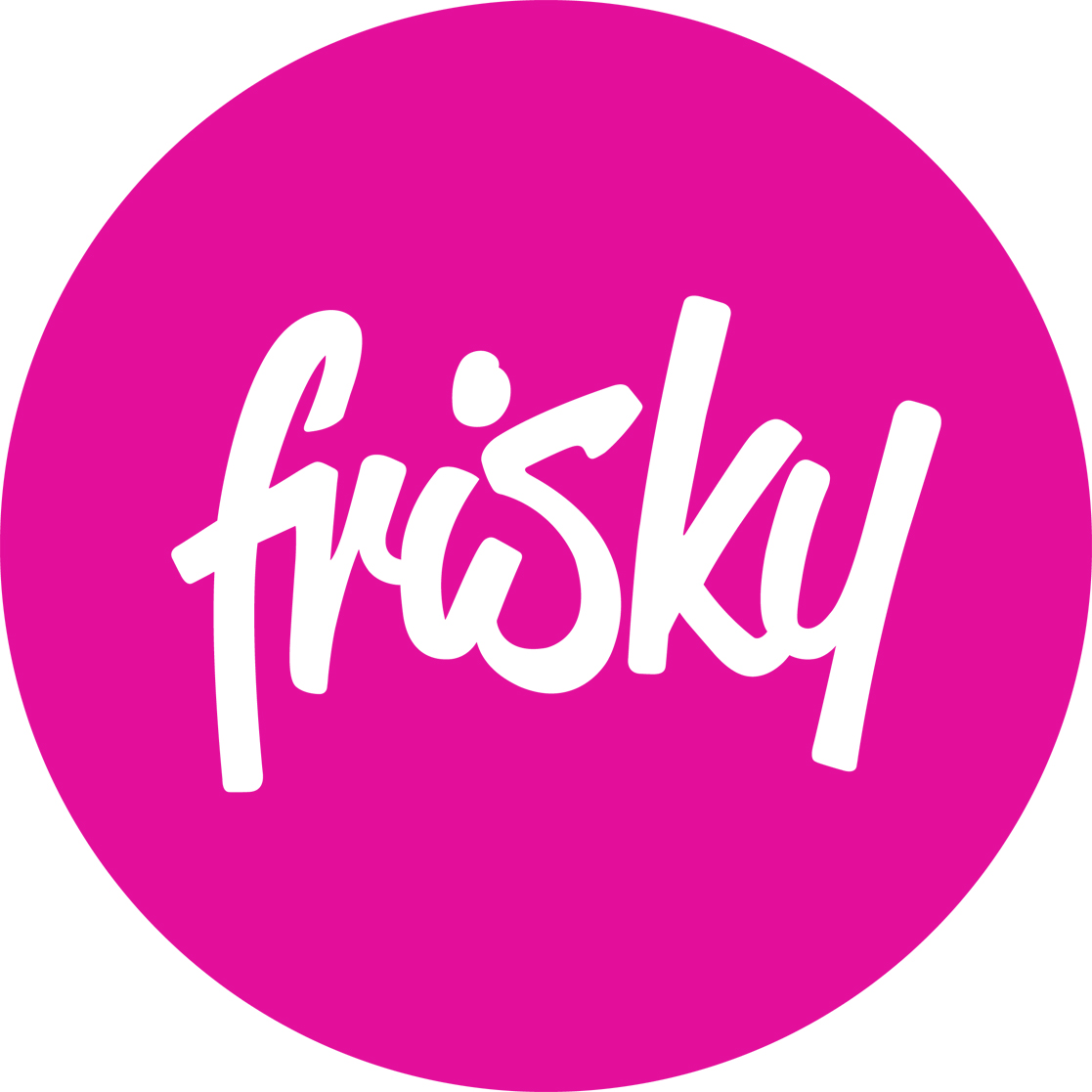
Frisky logo

Catalpa Festival was produced by Frisky, a Dublin, Ireland based event production organization. Frisky also tours with International artists in Brazil.
