= Pulltight, Missouri =

Unincorporated community in Missouri, United States

Coordinates: 36°46′57″N 89°19′09″W

Pulltight is an unincorporated community in Mississippi County, in the U.S. state of Missouri.

Pulltight originally developed around the site of a mill. According to tradition, the community was so named because the roads were often impassible, requiring locals to "pull tight" their wagons.
