= Wyatt, Missouri =

- City
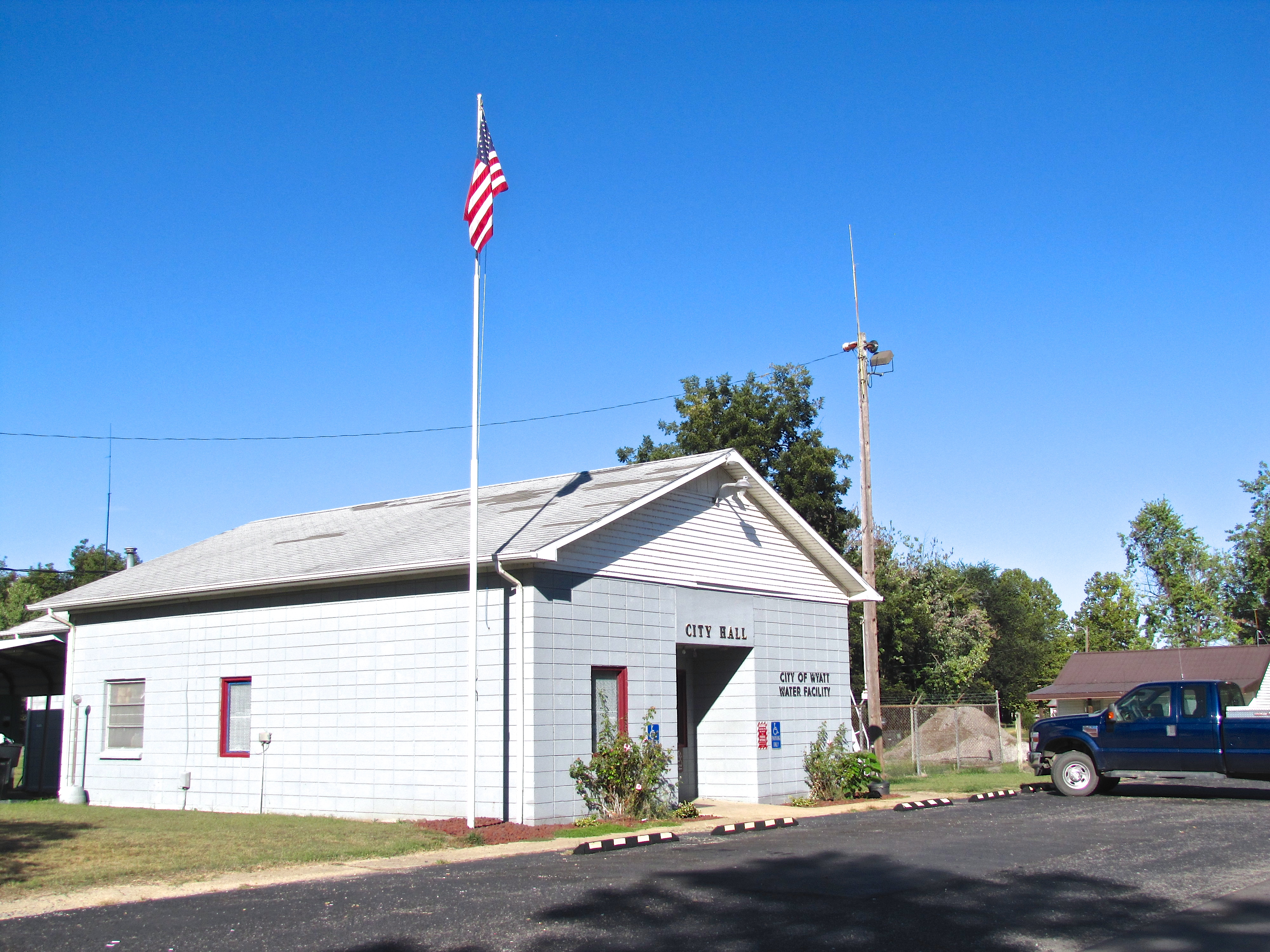
- Wyatt City Hall

- Location in Mississippi County and the state of Missouri
- Coordinates: 36°55′50″N 89°11′39″W
- Country: United States
- State: Missouri
- County: Mississippi

Area
  - Total: 1.23 sq mi (3.18 km^{2})
  - Land: 1.17 sq mi (3.04 km^{2})
  - Water: 0.058 sq mi (0.15 km^{2})
- Elevation: 308 ft (94 m)

Population (2020)
  - Total: 219
  - Density: 186.9/sq mi (72.16/km^{2})
- Time zone: UTC-6 (Central (CST))
  - Summer (DST): UTC-5 (CDT)
- ZIP code: 63882
- Area code: 573
- FIPS code: 29-81178
- GNIS feature ID: 2397384

Wyatt is a city in Mississippi County, Missouri, United States. The population was 219 at the 2020 census, down from 319 in 2010. It is the easternmost city west of the Mississippi River, as well as the easternmost incorporated town in Missouri.

== History ==
Wyatt originated as a settlement along the St. Louis Southwestern Railway (Cotton Belt Route) after the railroad was extended through southwestern Mississippi County in 1881. The first settlement developed on the Sam Keen farm and was known locally as Pevey Switch, a name derived from the "Peavine," a nickname for the railroad.

The community underwent several official name changes during its early years. The first post office was established as Manes, named for local resident Ben Manes. In 1891 the post office became Smithton in honor of Isaac N. Smith Sr., but the United States Post Office Department rejected the name because it duplicated the existing Smithton post office in Pettis County. The community was subsequently renamed Hunter for landowner W. H. Hunter of neighboring Scott County. Between 1893 and 1895 the post office operated as Payne, named for Jaspar Payne. In 1896 the community adopted the name Wyatt in honor of William Wyatt, a landowner, postmaster, and town developer.

William Wyatt later laid out the town, and the original town plat was recorded on May 14, 1900. A second plat, known as the Wyatt Addition, was recorded on September 12, 1900. During the early twentieth century Wyatt developed into an agricultural shipping center served by the Cotton Belt Railroad. Cotton production, grain shipping, lumber operations, and local businesses formed the basis of the community's economy.

Rail transportation remained central to Wyatt's development throughout the first half of the twentieth century. The Cotton Belt line connected the community with Bird's Point, East Prairie, and other regional markets before portions of the line were gradually abandoned.

The Cotton Belt rail line, running for 5.3 miles (8.5 km) between Bird's Point and Wyatt, was abandoned by ICC order on October 9, 1938. In late 1941, an oil pipeline was laid on the former railroad right-of-way between Wyatt and Bird's Point to facilitate the transportation of crude oil by barge. The Cotton Belt handled railroad tank cars from Arkansas, Louisiana, and Texas to Wyatt for shipment by pipeline to Bird's Point and transloading onto barges. The 8.7-mile (14.0 km) section of railroad between Wyatt and East Prairie was abandoned by ICC order on April 25, 1980.

== Geography ==
Wyatt is on Missouri Route 77 in eastern Mississippi County, 5 miles (8 km) west and southwest of the Mississippi River. The village of Wilson City lies across U.S. Route 62 to the north. Wyatt is on the western edge of the Birds Point-New Madrid Floodway.

According to the U.S. Census Bureau, the city has a total area of 1.23 square miles (3.19 km^{2}), of which 1.17 square miles (3.03 km^{2}) are land and 0.06 square miles (0.16 km^{2}), or 4.56%, are water.

== Demographics ==
Historical population
Census	Pop.	Note	%±
1930	199		—
1940	417		109.5%
1950	345		−17.3%
1960	711		106.1%
1970	562		−21.0%
1980	441		−21.5%
1990	376		−14.7%
2000	364		−3.2%
2010	319		−12.4%
2020	219		−31.3%
U.S. Decennial Census

=== 2010 census ===
As of the census of 2010, there were 319 people, 135 households, and 84 families residing in the city. The population density was 272.6 inhabitants per square mile (105.3/km^{2}). There were 164 housing units at an average density of 140.2 per square mile (54.1/km^{2}). The racial makeup of the city was 84.33% White, 15.05% Black or African American, and 0.63% from two or more races. Hispanic or Latino of any race were 0.31% of the population.

There were 135 households, of which 33.3% had children under the age of 18 living with them, 45.9% were married couples living together, 10.4% had a female householder with no husband present, 5.9% had a male householder with no wife present, and 37.8% were non-families. 33.3% of all households were made up of individuals, and 12.6% had someone living alone who was 65 years of age or older. The average household size was 2.36 and the average family size was 3.00.

The median age in the city was 37.9 years. 27% of residents were under the age of 18; 6.9% were between the ages of 18 and 24; 23.5% were from 25 to 44; 27.6% were from 45 to 64; and 15% were 65 years of age or older. The gender makeup of the city was 50.5% male and 49.5% female.

=== 2000 census ===
As of the census of 2000, there were 364 people, 163 households, and 108 families residing in the city. The population density was 316.7 inhabitants per square mile (122.3/km^{2}). There were 185 housing units at an average density of 160.9 per square mile (62.1/km^{2}). The racial makeup of the city was 89.84% White, 6.87% African American, and 3.30% from two or more races.

There were 163 households, out of which 28.2% had children under the age of 18 living with them, 47.9% were married couples living together, 13.5% had a female householder with no husband present, and 33.7% were non-families. 30.7% of all households were made up of individuals, and 20.9% had someone living alone who was 65 years of age or older. The average household size was 2.23 and the average family size was 2.69.

In the city the population was spread out, with 22.3% under the age of 18, 8.0% from 18 to 24, 22.8% from 25 to 44, 24.7% from 45 to 64, and 22.3% who were 65 years of age or older. The median age was 42 years. For every 100 females there were 89.6 males. For every 100 females age 18 and over, there were 86.2 males.

The median income for a household in the city was $19,444, and the median income for a family was $21,528. Males had a median income of $20,750 versus $18,750 for females. The per capita income for the city was $13,646. About 19.6% of families and 20.2% of the population were below the poverty line, including 38.0% of those under age 18 and 10.2% of those age 65 or over.

== Education ==
It is in the Charleston R-I School District.
