= Charleston, Missouri =

City in Missouri, U.S.

- City
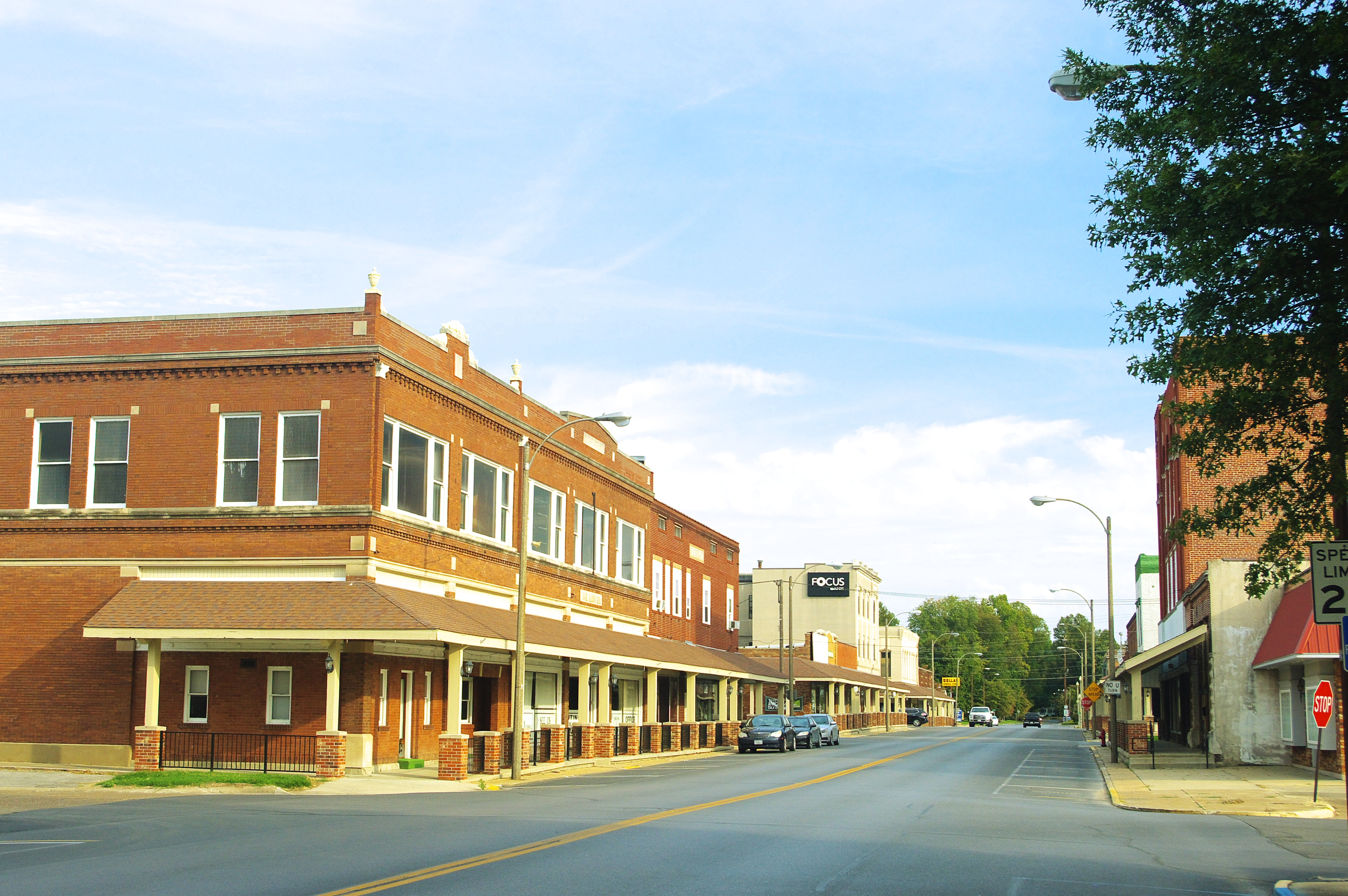
- Main Street, October 2017
- Nickname: "Flower of the Bootheel"
- Location in Mississippi County and the state of Missouri
- Coordinates: 36°55′17″N 89°20′47″W
- Country: United States
- State: Missouri
- County: Mississippi

Area
  - Total: 4.85 sq mi (12.56 km^{2})
  - Land: 4.80 sq mi (12.42 km^{2})
  - Water: 0.054 sq mi (0.14 km^{2})
- Elevation: 322 ft (98 m)

Population (2020)
  - Total: 5,056
  - Density: 1,054.3/sq mi (407.07/km^{2})
- Time zone: UTC-6 (Central (CST))
  - Summer (DST): UTC-5 (CDT)
- ZIP code: 63834
- Area code: 573
- FIPS code: 29-13366
- GNIS feature ID: 2393804
- Website: www.charlestonmo.us

Charleston is a city in and the county seat of Mississippi County, Missouri, United States. The population was 5,056 at the 2020 census, a decrease from 5,947 in 2010. and since 1968 has been home to the annual Dogwood-Azalea Festival which highlights the old homes and gardens throughout the town.

== History ==
Charleston is the largest town on the Missouri side near the confluence of the Mississippi and Ohio rivers. Its history has long been tied to river commerce and the development of the highly productive agricultural lands that surround the community.

Settlement initially occurred on the north side of town, in what in 1805 was called "Matthews Prairie".

After purchasing 22.5 acres (91,000 m^{2}) for $337, Joseph Moore laid out Charleston in 1837. Some say the community derives its name from nearby Charles Prairie, while others believe the name is a transfer from Charleston, South Carolina. In 1845, it was selected as the county seat. A post office in Charleston has been in operation since 1847.

The Civil War Battle of Charleston was fought on August 19, 1861. Killed in the battle were one Union soldier and thirteen Missouri State Guard soldiers.

On September 1, 1861, Confederate General M. Jeff Thompson robbed the Union Bank of Charleston. Thompson, who handed the cashier a note, gave the cashier an hour to get approval from superiors to give him keys to the vault. After receiving the money, he left a receipt for $57,000 and discovered later that only $56,000 was in the bags.

The city was the epicenter of the October 31, 1895, 5.9 M_{fa} earthquake on the New Madrid Seismic Zone. The quake damaged virtually every building in Charleston, creating sand volcanoes and cracking a pier on the Cairo Rail Bridge. Chimneys toppled as far away as St. Louis, Missouri; Memphis, Tennessee; Gadsden, Alabama; and Evansville, Indiana. The fate of specific buildings may also be traced by Sanborn maps that were produced of the town during this period. This was the largest quake since the 1812 New Madrid earthquake, which measured at 8.3 and was the biggest recorded quake in the contiguous United States. One of the most visible signs of the quake is located south of Charleston at Henson Lake, which was greatly expanded by the quake.

In 1901, the county courthouse was built. It was designed by J.B. Legg, who designed numerous buildings throughout Missouri, including the Gasconade and St. Charles County courthouses. On February 10, 1997, the courthouse was heavily damaged by fire and was subsequently torn down.

The Southeast Correctional Center, is a maximum security state prison for men that was opened in 2001. It is located on the southernmost edge of the city, less than one mile south of exit 10 off Interstate 57.

Just south of Charleston is Missouri's largest American Flag mural. It was completed in 2024 by artist Ray Harvey of New Haven, Missouri. The mural is located on the property of Delta Growers Association and can be easily seen from Route 105.

The Hearnes Site, Missouri Pacific Depot, Moore House, McCutchen Theatre, and Jacob Swank House are listed on the National Register of Historic Places.

== Geography ==
Charleston is situated in northern Mississippi County, 12 miles (19 km) west-southwest of the confluence of the Mississippi and Ohio rivers at Bird's Point. Interstate 57 passes through Charleston, connecting it with southern Illinois across the Mississippi River to the northeast, and Interstate 55 near Sikeston to the west. U.S. Route 62 and Missouri Route 105 intersect near downtown Charleston.

According to the U.S. Census Bureau, Charleston has a total area of 4.85 square miles (12.56 km^{2}), of which 4.80 square miles (12.43 km^{2}) are land and 0.06 square miles (0.16 km^{2}), or 1.15%, are water.

== Demographics ==
Historical population
Census	Pop.	Note	%±
1860	273		—
1870	635		132.6%
1880	1,028		61.9%
1890	1,381		34.3%
1900	1,893		37.1%
1910	3,144		66.1%
1920	3,410		8.5%
1930	3,357		−1.6%
1940	5,182		54.4%
1950	5,501		6.2%
1960	5,911		7.5%
1970	5,131		−13.2%
1980	5,230		1.9%
1990	5,085		−2.8%
2000	4,732		−6.9%
2010	5,947		25.7%
2020	5,056		−15.0%

=== Racial and ethnic composition ===
Charleston, Missouri – Racial and ethnic composition Note: the US Census treats Hispanic/Latino as an ethnic category. This table excludes Latinos from the racial categories and assigns them to a separate category. Hispanics/Latinos may be of any race.
Race / Ethnicity (NH = Non-Hispanic)	Pop 2000	Pop 2010	Pop 2020	% 2000	% 2010	% 2020
White alone (NH)	2,493	2,777	2,159	52.68%	46.70%	42.70%
Black or African American alone (NH)	2,136	2,983	2,639	45.14%	50.16%	52.20%
Native American or Alaska Native alone (NH)	2	2	9	0.04%	0.03%	0.18%
Asian alone (NH)	13	14	13	0.27%	0.24%	0.26%
Pacific Islander alone (NH)	0	0	0	0.00%	0.00%	0.00%
Other race alone (NH)	1	8	25	0.02%	0.13%	0.49%
Mixed race or Multiracial (NH)	35	57	122	0.74%	0.96%	2.41%
Hispanic or Latino (any race)	52	106	89	1.10%	1.78%	1.76%
Total	4,732	5,947	5,056	100.00%	100.00%	100.00%

=== 2020 census ===
As of the 2020 census, Charleston had a population of 5,056. The median age was 40.7 years. 18.7% of residents were under the age of 18 and 16.6% of residents were 65 years of age or older. For every 100 females there were 147.0 males, and for every 100 females age 18 and over there were 161.5 males age 18 and over.

0.0% of residents lived in urban areas, while 100.0% lived in rural areas.

There were 1,603 households in Charleston, of which 30.5% had children under the age of 18 living in them. Of all households, 30.7% were married-couple households, 20.3% were households with a male householder and no spouse or partner present, and 42.3% were households with a female householder and no spouse or partner present. About 33.2% of all households were made up of individuals and 13.9% had someone living alone who was 65 years of age or older.

There were 1,789 housing units, of which 10.4% were vacant. The homeowner vacancy rate was 1.4% and the rental vacancy rate was 9.1%.

=== 2010 census ===
As of the census of 2010, there were 5,947 people, 1,705 households, and 1,107 families residing in the city. The population density was 1,239.0 inhabitants per square mile (478.4/km^{2}). There were 1,883 housing units at an average density of 392.3 per square mile (151.5/km^{2}). The racial makeup of the city was 47.55% White, 50.45% Black or African American, 0.03% Native American, 0.32% Asian, 0.61% from other races, and 1.04% from two or more races. Hispanic or Latino of any race were 1.78% of the population.

There were 1,705 households, of which 35.4% had children under the age of 18 living with them, 35.5% were married couples living together, 25.3% had a female householder with no husband present, 4.2% had a male householder with no wife present, and 35.1% were non-families. 32.1% of all households were made up of individuals, and 11.6% had someone living alone who was 65 years of age or older. The average household size was 2.44 and the average family size was 3.05.

The median age in the city was 37.1 years. 20.3% of residents were under the age of 18; 9.6% were between the ages of 18 and 24; 32% were from 25 to 44; 26.4% were from 45 to 64; and 11.6% were 65 years of age or older. The gender makeup of the city was 61.3% male and 38.7% female.

=== 2000 census ===
As of the census of 2000, there were 4,732 people, 1,834 households, and 1,228 families residing in the city. The population density was 1,011.8 inhabitants per square mile (390.7/km^{2}). There were 1,957 housing units at an average density of 418.5 per square mile (161.6/km^{2}). The racial makeup of the city was 53.11% White, 45.60% African American, 0.04% Native American, 0.27% Asian, 0.02% Pacific Islander, 0.15% from other races, and 0.80% from two or more races. Hispanic or Latino of any race were 1.10% of the population.

There were 1,834 households, out of which 32.9% had children under the age of 18 living with them, 39.0% were married couples living together, 24.8% had a female householder with no husband present, and 33.0% were non-families. 30.6% of all households were made up of individuals, and 16.0% had someone living alone who was 65 years of age or older. The average household size was 2.50 and the average family size was 3.13.

In the city, the population was spread out, with 30.2% under the age of 18, 8.5% from 18 to 24, 24.6% from 25 to 44, 20.8% from 45 to 64, and 16.0% who were 65 years of age or older. The median age was 35 years. For every 100 females, there were 82.6 males. For every 100 females age 18 and over, there were 74.7 males.

The median income for a household in the city was $21,812, and the median income for a family was $28,178. Males had a median income of $25,908 versus $17,292 for females. The per capita income for the city was $12,876. About 21.2% of families and 26.0% of the population were below the poverty line, including 41.3% of those under age 18 and 16.8% of those age 65 or over.

== Government ==
- List of Charleston mayors

== Education ==
It is in the Charleston R-I School District. Charleston R-I School District operates one elementary school, one middle school, and Charleston High School. Charleston High School has won 12 state boys basketball championships, the most recent being in 2022.

In 1963, voters of the Charleston, Anniston, and Fox school districts passed a unified school district reorganization plan by a vote of 1,111 to 167.

Charleston has a public library, a branch of the Mississippi County Library District.

== Notable people ==
- Charlie Babb, former NFL player for the Miami Dolphins
- Lanie Black, Missouri state legislator
- William H. Danforth, businessman
- Ricky Frazier, former basketball player
- Betty Cooper Hearnes, Missouri politician
- Warren E. Hearnes, former Missouri governor
- James Boon Lankershim, Los Angeles area landowner and real estate developer
- James Naile, baseball player for the St. Louis Cardinals
- Ernie Nevel, baseball player
- Kenny Rollins, basketball player
- Joseph J. Russell, former member of the State house of representatives in 1886–1890
- John E. Scott, former state senate president pro tempore
- Samuel "Bay" Taylor, Negro league baseball player
- Matt Whiteside, baseball player
- Janie Bradford, American songwriter

== See also ==
- List of cities in Missouri
