= Mississippi County, Missouri =

County in Missouri, United States

- County
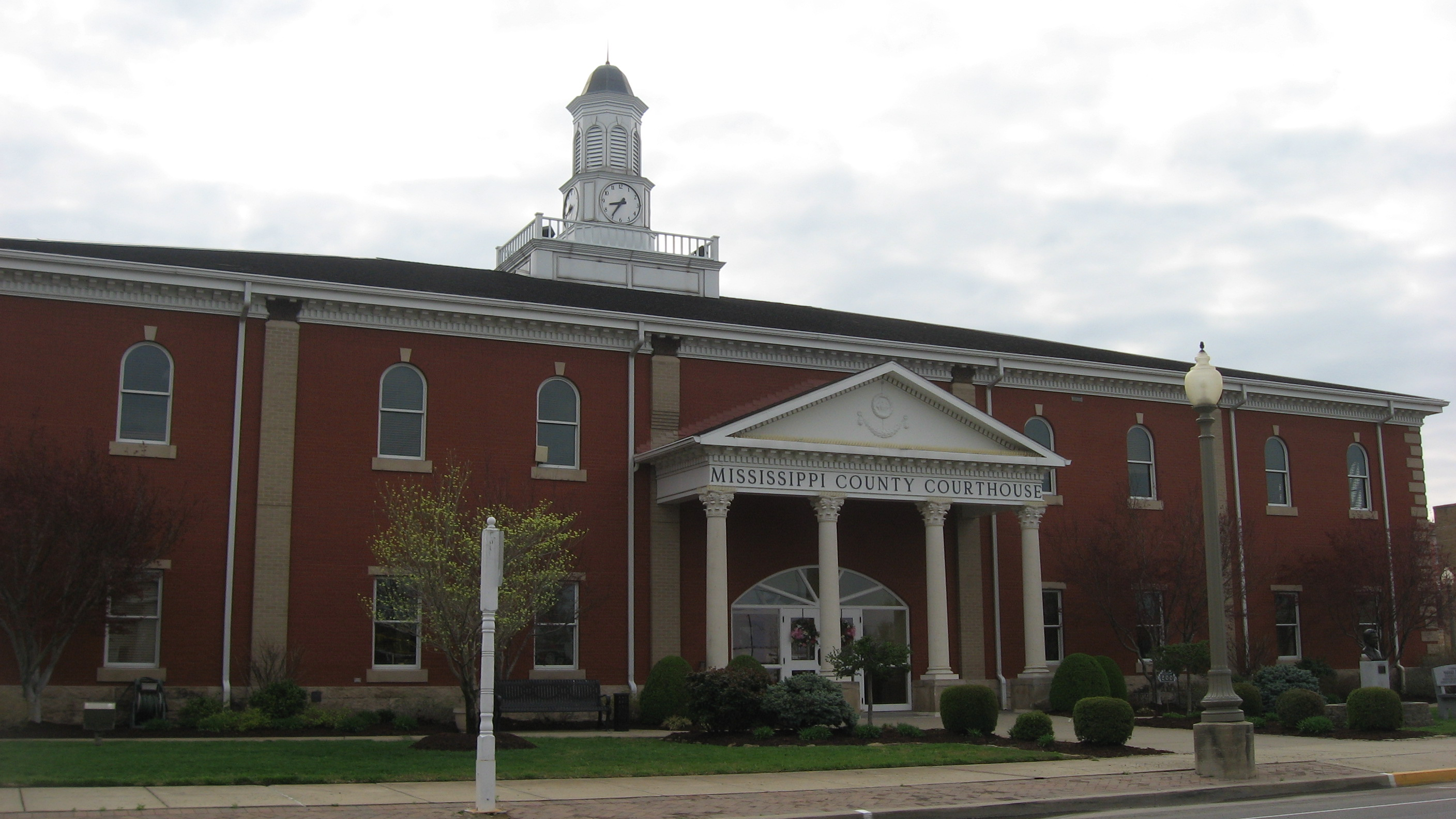
- Mississippi County Courthouse in Charleston

- Location within the U.S. state of Missouri
- Coordinates: 36°50′N 89°17′W
- Country: United States
- State: Missouri
- Founded: February 14, 1845
- Named for: Mississippi River
- Seat: Charleston
- Largest city: Charleston

Area
  - Total: 429 sq mi (1,110 km^{2})
  - Land: 412 sq mi (1,070 km^{2})
  - Water: 17 sq mi (44 km^{2}) 4.0%

Population (2020)
  - Total: 12,577
  - Estimate (2025): 12,003 ▼
  - Density: 30.5/sq mi (11.8/km^{2})
- Time zone: UTC−6 (Central)
  - Summer (DST): UTC−5 (CDT)
- Congressional district: 8th
- Website: Mississippi County, Missouri

Mississippi County is a county located in the southeastern portion of the U.S. state of Missouri, with its eastern border formed by the Mississippi River. As of the 2020 census, the population was 12,577. The largest city and county seat is Charleston. The county was officially organized on February 14, 1845, and was named after the Mississippi River.

== History ==
Mississippi County is located in what was formerly known as "Tywappity Bottom," a vast floodplain area bordered by the Scott County Hills on the north, St. James Bayou on the south, the Mississippi River on the east, and Little River on the west.

In 1540, the Spanish explorer Hernando De Soto penetrated to the Arkansas River and perhaps well into present-day southeastern Missouri, which was then populated by various Native American tribes, including the Osage. Under pressure from a constantly advancing white settlement, the Native Americans gradually retreated westward. The area of southeastern Missouri was noted for its level swampy lowlands, subject to the seasonal flooding of the Mississippi River, which had resulted in extremely fertile soil.

By 1820 American pioneers, many migrating from the southern states, had settled most of the present counties of southeastern Missouri. The settlers were primarily farmers who came from Illinois and the states of the Upper South: Virginia, Kentucky, and Tennessee. They were drawn by the fertile and cheap lands found in the area of present-day Charleston, Missouri. Cotton was cultivated through the 19th century, and the planters depended on enslaved African-American workers before the Civil War and freedmen afterward. There were marked adjustments as people adjusted to the free labor market.

The first American settlers reached what became Charleston in 1830. Seven years later, Thankful Randol sold Joseph Moore 22½ acres of land. Moore used it to lay out a plan for the city of Charleston. Its original boundary was 12 blocks square - four north and south, and three east and west. The Original Plat was filed on May 20, 1837. The General Assembly passed an act to incorporate the city of Charleston on March 25, 1872.

During the late 19th and early 20th centuries, violence increased against black Americans as the state disfranchised minority voters and enforce the Jim Crow segregation laws. Four African Americans were lynched in Mississippi County, the second-highest number in the state and tied with Callaway County. Three of these murders took place in the county seat of Charleston. The fourth man was killed in Belmont, Missouri in 1905. Sam Fields and Robert Coleman were lynched in Charleston on July 3, 1910, allegedly for committing murder and robbery. The joint lynching was witnessed by a crowd of about 1,000. Roosevelt Grigsby was lynched in Charleston in December 1924 by a mob of 200, who accused him of attempting to rape a woman.

At the turn of the 20th century, the virgin forests attracted timber barons. Following the clearing of the timber, the state assisted in the construction of levees, forming drainage districts to redevelop the land. As hundreds of miles of levees and dikes were constructed within the Little River Drainage District, thousands of acres of land were drained and "reclaimed" for agricultural use. The reclaimed land, highly fertile due to centuries of flooding from the Mississippi River, was cultivated for cotton, corn, and wheat. Since the late 20th century, soybeans and rice have been important commodity crops and are grown on an industrial scale.

== Geography ==
2 horse statues at fireworks retailer Boomland overlooking Interstate 57.

According to the U.S. Census Bureau, the county has a total area of 429 square miles (1,110 km^{2}), of which 412 square miles (1,070 km^{2}) is land and 17 square miles (44 km^{2}) (4.0%) is water. It is the easternmost county in the state, as well as the easternmost county in the United States located west of the Mississippi River.

=== Adjacent counties ===
- Alexander County, Illinois (north)
- Ballard County, Kentucky (northeast across the Mississippi River)
- Carlisle County, Kentucky (east across the river)
- Hickman County, Kentucky (southeast across the river)
- Fulton County, Kentucky (south across the river)
- New Madrid County (southwest)
- Scott County (northwest)

Mississippi County has borders across the river with four Kentucky counties, but it has no direct highway connection between any of them due to the mile-wide barrier of the river in this area. None of the four Kentucky counties that border Missouri has any direct highway connection with Missouri. Kentucky and Missouri are the only two U.S. states to border each other, even across a major river, without a direct highway connection between them. This reflects the relatively low populations among the river counties on both sides, which are largely rural in character. In early 2016, Mississippi County was declared as the poorest county in Missouri.

=== Major highways ===
- Interstate 57
- U.S. Route 60
- U.S. Route 62
- Route 75
- Route 77
- Route 80
- Route 102
- Route 105

== Demographics ==
The rural county was at its peak of population in 1940. With changes in agriculture and mechanization requiring fewer workers, the number of jobs have declined, as has county population.

Historical population
Census	Pop.	Note	%±
1850	3,123		—
1860	4,859		55.6%
1870	4,982		2.5%
1880	9,270		86.1%
1890	10,134		9.3%
1900	11,837		16.8%
1910	14,557		23.0%
1920	12,860		−11.7%
1930	15,762		22.6%
1940	23,149		46.9%
1950	22,551		−2.6%
1960	20,695		−8.2%
1970	16,647		−19.6%
1980	15,726		−5.5%
1990	14,442		−8.2%
2000	13,427		−7.0%
2010	14,358		6.9%
2020	12,577		−12.4%
2025 (est.)	12,003	▼	−4.6%
U.S. Decennial Census; 1790-1960 1900-1990; 1990-2000 2010-2015

=== 2020 census ===
As of the 2020 census, the county had a population of 12,577. The median age was 42.3 years. 21.0% of residents were under the age of 18 and 19.5% of residents were 65 years of age or older. For every 100 females there were 111.9 males, and for every 100 females age 18 and over there were 114.7 males age 18 and over.

The racial makeup of the county was 70.8% White, 24.5% Black or African American, 0.3% American Indian and Alaska Native, 0.2% Asian, 0.0% Native Hawaiian and Pacific Islander, 0.9% from some other race, and 3.3% from two or more races. Hispanic or Latino residents of any race comprised 1.8% of the population.

0.0% of residents lived in urban areas, while 100.0% lived in rural areas.

There were 4,740 households in the county, of which 29.1% had children under the age of 18 living with them and 33.9% had a female householder with no spouse or partner present. About 31.4% of all households were made up of individuals and 14.8% had someone living alone who was 65 years of age or older.

There were 5,283 housing units, of which 10.3% were vacant. Among occupied housing units, 63.5% were owner-occupied and 36.5% were renter-occupied. The homeowner vacancy rate was 1.9% and the rental vacancy rate was 8.0%.

Mississippi County, Missouri – Racial and ethnic composition Note: the US Census treats Hispanic/Latino as an ethnic category. This table excludes Latinos from the racial categories and assigns them to a separate category. Hispanics/Latinos may be of any race.
Race / Ethnicity (NH = Non-Hispanic)	Pop 1980	Pop 1990	Pop 2000	Pop 2010	Pop 2020	% 1980	% 1990	% 2000	% 2010	% 2020
White alone (NH)	12,711	11,565	10,411	10,521	8,814	80.83%	80.08%	77.54%	73.28%	70.08%
Black or African American alone (NH)	2,903	2,796	2,735	3,423	3,060	18.46%	19.36%	20.37%	23.84%	24.33%
Native American or Alaska Native alone (NH)	4	26	33	29	33	0.03%	0.18%	0.25%	0.20%	0.26%
Asian alone (NH)	8	15	15	19	20	0.05%	0.10%	0.11%	0.13%	0.16%
Native Hawaiian or Pacific Islander alone (NH)	x	x	0	1	0	x	x	0.00%	0.01%	0.00%
Other race alone (NH)	2	0	2	8	52	0.01%	0.00%	0.01%	0.06%	0.41%
Mixed race or Multiracial (NH)	x	x	102	126	375	x	x	0.76%	0.88%	2.98%
Hispanic or Latino (any race)	98	40	129	231	223	0.62%	0.28%	0.96%	1.61%	1.77%
Total	15,726	14,442	13,427	14,358	12,577	100.00%	100.00%	100.00%	100.00%	100.00%

=== 2000 census ===
As of the census of 2000, there were 13,427 people, 5,383 households, and 3,671 families residing in the county. The population density was 32 people per square mile (12 people/km^{2}). There were 5,840 housing units at an average density of 14 units per square mile (5.4/km^{2}). The racial makeup of the county was 77.93% White, 20.53% Black or African American, 0.25% Native American, 0.11% Asian, 0.01% Pacific Islander, 0.29% from other races, and 0.89% from two or more races. Approximately 0.96% of the population were Hispanic or Latino of any race.

There were 5,383 households, out of which 31.20% had children under the age of 18 living with them, 47.70% were married couples living together, 17.30% had a female householder with no husband present, and 31.80% were non-families. 28.50% of all households were made up of individuals, and 14.40% had someone living alone who was 65 years of age or older. The average household size was 2.44 and the average family size was 2.98.

In the county, the population was spread out, with 26.30% under the age of 18, 8.80% from 18 to 24, 25.40% from 25 to 44, 23.60% from 45 to 64, and 15.90% who were 65 years of age or older. The median age was 37 years. For every 100 females there were 87.60 males. For every 100 females age 18 and over, there were 82.70 males.

The median income for a household in the county was $28,837, and the median income for a family was $35,554. Males had a median income of $26,110 versus $17,204 for females. The per capita income for the county was $16,847. About 19.00% of families and 23.70% of the population were below the poverty line, including 31.70% of those under age 18 and 21.70% of those age 65 or over.

== Education ==
Of adults 25 years of age and older in Mississippi County, 61.1% possess a high school diploma or higher, while 9.6% hold a bachelor's degree or higher as their highest educational attainment.

The county has three school districts: Charleston R-I School District, East Prairie R-II School District, and Scott County R-IV School District.

=== Public schools ===
- Charleston R-I School District - Charleston
  - Warren E. Hearnes Elementary School (PK-05)
  - Charleston Middle School (06-08)
  - Charleston High School (09-12)
- East Prairie R-II School District - East Prairie
  - East Prairie Elementary School (PK-04)
  - East Prairie Middle School (05-08)
  - East Prairie High School (09-12)
- Scott County R-IV School District - Benton
  - Kelly Elementary School (K-05)
  - Kelly Middle School (06-08)
  - Thomas W. Kelly High School (09-12)

=== Private schools ===
- St. Henry's School - Charleston - (01-08) - Roman Catholic

=== Public libraries ===
- Mississippi County Library District

=== Colleges and universities ===
Three Rivers College's service area includes Mississippi County.

== Communities ==
=== Cities and villages ===
- Anniston
- Bertrand
- Charleston (seat)
- East Prairie
- Miner (mostly in Scott County)
- Pinhook
- Wilson City
- Wyatt

=== Census-designated place ===
- Whiting

=== Unincorporated communities ===
- Alfalfa Center
- Bird's Point
- Buckeye
- Catalpa
- Deventer
- Dogwood
- Dorena
- Henson
- Pulltight
- Samos
- Texas Bend
- Wolf Island

== Politics ==
Mississippi County, Missouri

Elected countywide officials
Assessor	Lisa Finley-Norton	Republican
Circuit Clerk	Christina Turner	Republican
County Clerk	Emily Pullen	Republican
Collector	Cyndi Hensley	Republican
Commissioner (presiding)	James Conn	Republican
Commissioner (district 1)	Mitch Pullen	Republican
Commissioner (district 2)	Darrell Jones	Republican
Coroner	Terry A. Parker	Democratic
Prosecuting Attorney	Claire Poley	Republican
Public Administrator	Melissa Fisher Davis	Republican
Recorder	George Bays	Democratic
Sheriff	Britton Ferrell	Republican
Treasurer	Paul Moore	Republican

=== State ===
Mississippi County is split in half by two different districts of the Missouri House of Representatives. The northern portion of the county is a part of House District 148 and is currently represented by State Representative Holly Rehder(R) of Sikeston. The southern portion of the county is a part of House District 149 and is represented by State Representative Don Rone(R) of Portageville.

All of Mississippi County is a part of Missouri's 25th District in the Missouri Senate and is currently represented by State Senator Jason Bean(R).

=== Federal ===
Mississippi County is included in Missouri's 8th Congressional District and is represented by Jason T. Smith (R-Salem) in the U.S. House of Representatives.

==== Political culture ====
United States presidential election results for Mississippi County, Missouri
Year	Republican		Democratic		Third party(ies)	
Year	No.	%	No.	%	No.	%
1888	787	36.97%	1,312	61.63%	30	1.41%
1892	734	35.70%	1,240	60.31%	82	3.99%
1896	1,074	39.01%	1,673	60.77%	6	0.22%
1900	1,020	42.03%	1,384	57.03%	23	0.95%
1904	1,161	47.41%	1,229	50.18%	59	2.41%
1908	1,320	44.75%	1,589	53.86%	41	1.39%
1912	1,050	39.49%	1,388	52.20%	221	8.31%
1916	1,330	40.76%	1,874	57.43%	59	1.81%
1920	2,193	46.87%	2,442	52.19%	44	0.94%
1924	1,797	41.69%	2,360	54.76%	153	3.55%
1928	1,999	43.37%	2,602	56.45%	8	0.17%
1932	1,687	34.73%	3,136	64.55%	35	0.72%
1936	2,552	37.88%	4,160	61.75%	25	0.37%
1940	3,073	41.18%	4,362	58.46%	27	0.36%
1944	1,944	31.59%	4,182	67.97%	27	0.44%
1948	1,293	21.86%	4,592	77.63%	30	0.51%
1952	2,380	35.36%	4,331	64.35%	19	0.28%
1956	2,111	36.62%	3,653	63.38%	0	0.00%
1960	2,629	40.55%	3,855	59.45%	0	0.00%
1964	1,665	29.31%	4,015	70.69%	0	0.00%
1968	1,421	26.82%	2,303	43.46%	1,575	29.72%
1972	2,727	64.97%	1,470	35.03%	0	0.00%
1976	1,733	33.87%	3,366	65.79%	17	0.33%
1980	2,459	44.08%	3,040	54.49%	80	1.43%
1984	2,502	49.78%	2,524	50.22%	0	0.00%
1988	2,218	43.99%	2,814	55.81%	10	0.20%
1992	1,675	29.45%	3,226	56.73%	786	13.82%
1996	1,595	30.39%	3,235	61.63%	419	7.98%
2000	2,395	45.93%	2,756	52.85%	64	1.23%
2004	2,903	54.79%	2,374	44.81%	21	0.40%
2008	3,034	56.65%	2,247	41.95%	75	1.40%
2012	2,997	60.91%	1,858	37.76%	65	1.32%
2016	3,600	69.65%	1,458	28.21%	111	2.15%
2020	3,537	74.37%	1,178	24.77%	41	0.86%
2024	3,404	76.51%	1,015	22.81%	30	0.67%

At the presidential level, Mississippi County was a solidly Democratic county from its founding in 1845 through 2000, breaking with the Democratic Party only to vote for Constitutional Unionist John Bell in 1860 and Richard Nixon in his 1972 landslide within this period. In 2004, George W. Bush became only the second Republican ever to carry the county, despite his narrow national popular vote win, and in 2008, John McCain carried it again, by a larger margin, despite his convincing national defeat. As of 2020, the county has voted Republican for five straight elections, with an increased vote share every time; the Republican vote share has not gone below 60% since 2008.

Voters in Mississippi County generally adhere to socially and culturally conservative principles but are more moderate or populist on economic issues, typical of what was formerly considered the white conservative Dixiecrat philosophy of southern Democrats, before African Americans regained the power to vote. In 2004, Missourians voted on a constitutional amendment to define marriage as the union between a man and a woman—it overwhelmingly passed in Mississippi County with 86.87 percent of the vote. The initiative passed the state with 71 percent of support from voters; Missouri became the first state to ban same-sex marriage. (This law was overturned as unconstitutional by a US Supreme Court decision.) In 2006, Missourians voted on a constitutional amendment to fund and legalize embryonic stem cell research in the state—it failed in Mississippi County with 57.35 percent voting against the measure. The initiative narrowly passed the state with 51 percent of support from voters; Missouri became one of the first states in the nation to approve embryonic stem cell research.

Despite Mississippi County's longstanding tradition of supporting socially conservative platforms, voters in the county have a penchant for advancing populist causes such as increasing the minimum wage. In 2006, Missourians voted on a proposition (Proposition B) to increase the minimum wage in the state to $6.50 an hour—it passed Mississippi County with 75.66 percent of the vote. The proposition strongly passed every single county in Missouri, with 75.94 percent voting in favor as the minimum wage was increased to $6.50 an hour in the state.

=== Missouri presidential preference primary (2008) ===
During the 2008 presidential primary, voters in Mississippi County from both political parties supported candidates who finished in second place in the state at large and nationally. Former U.S. Senator Hillary Clinton (D-New York) received more votes, a total of 1,094, than any candidate from either party in Mississippi County during the 2008 presidential primary.

== See also ==
- National Register of Historic Places listings in Mississippi County, Missouri
