= List of state highways in Missouri =

State Highways of the Missouri Highway System
- Highway markers

System information
- Maintained by MODOT

System links
- Missouri State Highway System; Interstate; US; State; Supplemental

The following is a list of state highways in Missouri. State highways in Missouri are the responsibility of the Missouri Department of Transportation.

== Mainline routes ==
| Number | Length (mi) | Length (km) | Southern or western terminus | Northern or eastern terminus | Formed | Removed | Notes |
|---|---|---|---|---|---|---|---|
| Route 1 | 7.253 | 11.673 | Route 210 in North Kansas City | Route 152 in Kansas City | 1922 | current | |
| Route 2 | — | — | — | — | 1922 | 1926 | |
| Route 2 | 69.478 | 111.814 | K-68 at the Kansas state line | Route 52 in Windsor | 1926 | current | |
| Route 3 | — | — | — | — | 1922 | 1926 | |
| Route 3 | 73.738 | 118.670 | Route 5 / Route 240 near Fayette | Route 11 near Kirksville | 1926 | current | |
| Route 4 | 76 | 122 | US 136 at the Nebraska state line. | US 169 at the Iowa state line. | 1922 | 1960 | |
| Route 5 | 352.834 | 567.831 | AR 5 at the Arkansas state line | Iowa 5 at the Iowa state line | 1922 | current | |
| Route 6 | 208.551 | 335.630 | I-29 BL / US 169 in St. Joseph | US 24 / US 61 near Taylor | 1922 | current | |
| Route 7 | — | — | — | — | 1922 | 1926 | |
| Route 7 | 186.476 | 300.104 | I-44 near Laquey | US 24 near Independence | 1926 | current | |
| Route 8 | 192.660 | 310.056 | — | — | 1922 | 1926 | Became US 36 |
| Route 8 | 72.059 | 115.968 | I-44 / Route 68 in St. James | US 67 in Desloge | 1926 | current | |
| Route 9 | — | — | — | — | 1922 | 1926 | |
| Route 9 | — | — | — | — | 1926 | 1935 | |
| Route 9 | 14.273 | 22.970 | I-35 / I-70 / US 24 / US 40 in Kansas City | I-29 / US 71 in Kansas City | 1934 | current | |
| Route 10 | 47.780 | 76.894 | US 69 in Excelsior Springs | US 24 / US 65 near Carrollton | 1922 | current | |
| Route 11 | — | — | — | — | 1922 | 1926 | |
| Route 11 | 100.176 | 161.218 | US 24 near Brunswick | Route 15 near Baring | 1929 | current | |
| Route 12 | — | — | — | — | 1922 | 1926 | |
| Route 12 | — | — | — | — | 1926 | — | |
| Route 12 | — | — | — | — | 1934 | — | |
| Route 12 | — | — | — | — | 1939 | — | |
| Route 12 | 3.787 | 6.095 | I-435 in Kansas City | Spring Street in Independence | 1950 | current | |
| Route 13 | 290.608 | 467.688 | AR 21 at the Arkansas state line | US 69 / US 136 in Bethany | 1922 | current | |
| Route 14 | — | — | — | — | 1922 | 1926 | |
| Route 14 | 119.932 | 193.012 | US 60 in Marionville | US 63 near West Plains | 1926 | current | |
| Route 15 | 121.249 | 195.131 | US 54 in Mexico | CR V56 at the Iowa state line | 1922 | current | |
| Route 16 | — | — | — | — | 1922 | 1930 | |
| Route 16 | — | — | — | — | 1935 | 1941 | |
| Route 16 | 16.709 | 26.891 | Route 6 near Lewistown | US 61 Bus. in Canton | 1941 | current | |
| Route 17 | 186.870 | 300.738 | AR 395 at the Arkansas state line | US 54 near Eldon | 1922 | current | |
| Route 18 | — | — | — | — | 1922 | 1932 | |
| Route 18 | — | — | — | — | 1932 | 1934 | |
| Route 18 | 56.054 | 90.210 | CR 259 at the Kansas state line | Route 7 / Route 13 / Route 52 in Clinton | — | — | |
| Route 19 | 264.909 | 426.330 | US 63 in Thayer | US 61 near New London | 1922 | current | |
| Route 20 | 31.609 | 50.870 | Route 13 near Higginsville | US 65 Bus. in Marshall | 1922 | current | |
| Route 21 | 194.127 | 312.417 | AR 115 at the Arkansas state line | Route 30 in Affton | 1922 | current | |
| Route 22 | 28.797 | 46.344 | US 63 near Clark | US 54 / Route 15 near Mexico | 1922 | current | |
| Route 23 | 49.880 | 80.274 | Route 2 near Windsor | US 24 near Waverly | — | — | |
| Route 24 | — | — | — | — | 1922 | 1926 | |
| Route 25 | 91.180 | 146.740 | US 412 / Route 84 in Kennett | I-55 BL / US 61 / Route 34 / Route 72 in Jackson | 1922 | current | |
| Route 26 | — | — | — | — | 1922 | 1927 | |
| Route 26 | — | — | — | — | 1927 | — | |
| Route 26 | 7.0 | 11.3 | US 136 in Wayland | US 61 in Alexandria | 1953 | 1970 | Became US 136 |
| Route 27 | — | — | — | — | 1922 | 1969 | |
| Route 27 | 7.387 | 11.888 | US 61 near Wayland | Iowa 27 at the Iowa state line | 2004 | current | Avenue of the Saints |
| Route 28 | 71.267 | 114.693 | I-44 near St. Robert | US 50 in Rosebud | 1922 | current | |
| Route 29 | — | — | — | — | 1922 | 1930 | |
| Route 29 | — | — | — | — | 1935 | — | |
| Route 30 | 52.718 | 84.841 | I-44 in St. Clair | I-44 / I-55 in St. Louis | 1922 | current | |
| Route 31 | 26.852 | 43.214 | US 169 near Gower | US 169 near Union Star | 1922 | current | |
| Route 32 | 282.838 | 455.184 | US 54 in El Dorado Springs | Fourth Street in Ste. Genevieve | 1922 | current | |
| Route 33 | 54.980 | 88.482 | Route 291 in Liberty | Route 6 in Maysville | 1922 | current | |
| Route 34 | 103.378 | 166.371 | US 60 / Route 21 near Van Buren | IL 146 at the Illinois state line | 1922 | current | |
| Route 35 | — | — | — | — | 1922 | — | |
| Route 36 | — | — | — | — | 1922 | 1926 | |
| Route 37 | 78.683 | 126.628 | AR 37 at the Arkansas state line | US 160 / Route 126 in Golden City | 1922 | current | |
| Route 38 | — | — | — | — | 1922 | 1938 | |
| Route 38 | 80.561 | 129.650 | US 65 near Buffalo | Route 17 near Houston | 1940 | current | |
| Route 39 | 111.251 | 179.041 | AR 221 at the Arkansas state line | US 54 at Cedar Springs | 1922 | current | |
| Route 40 | — | — | — | — | 1922 | 1926 | |
| Route 41 | 45.981 | 73.999 | I-70 / US 40 / Route 135 near Boonville | US 24 near Brunswick | 1922 | current | |
| Route 42 | — | — | — | — | 1922 | — | |
| Route 42 | 60.410 | 97.220 | US 54 in Osage Beach | Route 28 near Belle | — | — | |
| Route 43 | — | — | — | — | 1922 | — | |
| Route 43 | 98.366 | 158.305 | SH-20 / AR 43 at the Oklahoma–Arkansas–Missouri tripoint | US 54 near Nevada | — | — | |
| Route 44 | — | — | — | — | 1922 | — | |
| Route 45 | — | — | — | — | 1922 | — | |
| Route 45 | 36.920 | 59.417 | I-29 / US 71 in Kansas City | US 59 / Route 273 in Lewis and Clark Village | — | — | |
| Route 46 | 86 | 138 | US 59 east of Fairfax | US 69 north of Eagleville | 1922 | current | |
| Route 47 | 117 | 188 | US 67 in Bonne Terre | Route 79 in Winfield | 1922 | current | |
| Route 48 | 20.128 | 32.393 | US 71 north of Savannah | US 169 in King City | 1922 | current | |
| Route 49 | 120 | 190 | US 67 north of Poplar Bluff | Route 19 in Cherryville | 1922 | current | |
| Route 50 | — | — | — | — | 1922 | 1926 | |
| Route 51 | 116 | 187 | AR 139 at the Arkansas state line | IL 150 at the Illinois state line | 1922 | current | |
| Route 52 | — | — | — | — | 1922 | 1926 | |
| Route 52 | 173 | 278 | K-52 at the Kansas state line | Route 133 east of St. Elizabeth | 1926 | current | |
| Route 53 | 33 | 53 | Route 25 in Holcomb | U.S. Route 160 / US 67 Bus. in Poplar Bluff | 1922 | current | |
| Route 54 | — | — | — | — | 1922 | 1927 | |
| Route 55 | — | — | — | — | 1922 | — | |
| Route 56 | — | — | — | — | 1922 | 1929 | |
| Route 56 | — | — | — | — | 1929 | 1957 | |
| Route 57 | — | — | — | — | 1922 | — | |
| Route 58 | 50 | 80 | Route D west of Belton | US 50 west of Warrensburg | 1922 | current | |
| Route 59 | — | — | — | — | 1922 | 1935 | |
| Route 59 | 45 | 72 | AR 59 at the Arkansas state line | I-44 / I-49 / US 71 in Fidelity | — | — | |
| Route 60 | — | — | — | — | 1922 | 1926 | |
| Route 61 | — | — | — | — | 1922 | 1926 | |
| Route 62 | — | — | — | — | 1922 | 1926 | |
| Route 62 | — | — | — | — | 1927 | — | |
| Route 63 | — | — | — | — | 1922 | 1926 | |
| Route 64 | 51.290 | 82.543 | Route 254 near Hermitage | Route 5 in Lebanon | 1922 | current | |
| Route 65 | — | — | — | — | 1922 | 1925 | |
| Route 66 | 14.239 | 22.915 | K-66 at the Kansas state line | I-44 / I-44 BL / I-49 east of Duenweg | — | — | Part of Historic US 66 |
| Route 67 | — | — | — | — | 1922 | 1926 | |
| Route 68 | 37 | 60 | US 63 north of Rolla | Route 19 in Salem | — | — | |
| Route 69 | — | — | — | — | 1922 | 1925 | |
| Route 70 | — | — | — | — | 1922 | — | |
| Route 71 | — | — | — | — | 1922 | 1923 | |
| Route 72 | 157 | 253 | I-44 BL in Rolla | I-55 BL / US 61 / Route 25 in Jackson | 1922 | current | |
| Route 73 | 20.034 | 32.242 | US 65 in Buffalo | US 54 near Macks Creek | 1933 | current | |
| Route 73 | — | — | — | — | 1929 | — | |
| Route 74 | 9 | 14 | Route 25 in Dutchtown | IL 146 at the Illinois state line | 1922 | current | |
| Route 75 | 5.567 | 8.959 | Route 80 east of East Prairie | Route 105 west of Anniston | 1968 | current | |
| Route 75 | — | — | — | — | 1929 | — | |
| Route 76 | 189 | 304 | Oklahoma state line near / Tiff City | US 60 / US 63 / Route 137 at Willow Springs | 1922 | current | |
| Route 77 | 65 | 105 | KY 1354 via Dorena-Hickman Ferry | Route 25 south of Dutchtown | — | — | |
| Route 77 | — | — | — | — | 1929 | — | |
| Route 78 | 12 | 19 | I-435 in Kansas City | Route 7 east of Independence | — | — | |
| Route 78 | — | — | — | — | 1922 | — | |
| Route 79 | 86 | 138 | I-70 in St. Peters | I-72 / US 36 / Route 110 in Hannibal | — | — | |
| Route 80 | 27.302 | 43.938 | US 61 / US 62 south of Sikeston | Dead end at the Mississippi River in Belmont | — | — | Used to end at Belmont-Columbus Ferry but closed |
| Route 80 | — | — | — | — | 1922 | — | |
| Route 81 | 40.954 | 65.909 | Route 16 west of Canton | Iowa 81 at the Iowa state line | — | — | |
| Route 82 | — | — | — | — | 1922 | — | |
| Route 82 | 39 | 63 | US 54 in El Dorado Springs | Route 83 east of Osceola | — | — | |
| Route 83 | 55 | 89 | Route 13 in Bolivar | US 65 / Route 7 at Warsaw | 1929 | current | |
| Route 84 | 30.215 | 48.626 | AR 90 at Arkansas state line | I-155 / US 412 in Caruthersville | 1922 | current | |
| Route 85 | 3.414 | 5.494 | Route A in Evona | US 136 in Albany | 1929 | current | |
| Route 86 | 110.324 | 177.549 | I-44 / I-44 BL / Route 43 in Joplin | US 65 in Ridgedale | 1922 | current | |
| Route 87 | 77 | 124 | US 54 in Eldon | Route 5 / Route 240 in Glasgow | 1929 | current | |
| Route 88 | — | — | — | — | 1922 | — | |
| Route 88 | 6.847 | 11.019 | US 60 / US 160 in Springfield | I-44 BL / US 65 Bus. in Springfield | — | — | |
| Route 89 | 38.737 | 62.341 | Route 28 in Belle | Route 100 in Chamois | 1929 | current | |
| Route 90 | 46.561 | 74.933 | Route 43 north of Southwest City | Route 37 in Washburn | 1922 | current | |
| Route 91 | 28.765 | 46.293 | US 61 in Morley | Route 51 in Advance | 1929 | current | |
| Route 92 | 39.594 | 63.720 | K-92 at the Kansas state line | US 69 in Excelsior Springs | 1922 | current | |
| Route 93 | — | — | — | — | 1929 | — | |
| Route 94 | 136.297 | 219.349 | US 63 / US 54 in Jefferson City | US 67 in West Alton | 1922 | current | |
| Route 95 | 93.051 | 149.751 | US 160 at Lutie | Route 32 at Lynchburg | 1929 | current | |
| Route 96 | — | — | — | — | 1922 | 1922 | |
| Route 96 | — | — | — | — | 1929 | 1941 | |
| Route 96 | 52 | 84 | Route 171 north of Carl Junction | I-44 west of Halltown | 1941 | current | Part of Historic US 66 |
| Route 97 | 74 | 119 | Route 86 north of Wheaton | Route 32 south of El Dorado Springs | 1929 | current | |
| Route 98 | 8.376 | 13.480 | Route 87 in Boonville | Cumberland Church Road in Overton | 1922 | current | |
| Route 99 | 14.9 | 24.0 | Route 30 in St. Louis | US 66 / US 67 / US 40 Byp. in Bellefontaine Neighbors | 1929 | — | Former highway bypassing Downtown St. Louis |
| Route 99 | 18.3 | 29.5 | US 160 east of West Plains | US 60 in Birch Tree | — | — | |
| Route 100 | 121.144 | 194.962 | US 50 in Linn | 3rd Street in St. Louis | 1929 | current | |
| Route 101 | 11.626 | 18.710 | AR 101 at the Arkansas state line | US 160 in Caulfield | 1941 | current | |
| Route 101 | — | — | — | — | 1929 | — | |
| Route 102 | 17.349 | 27.921 | Route 105 near East Prairie | Route 77 in Dorena | — | — | |
| Route 102 | — | — | — | — | 1929 | — | |
| Route 103 | 3.832 | 6.167 | Route Z in the Big Spring Historic District | US 60 near Van Buren | 1929 | current | unlabeled until 1933 |
| Route 104 | 3.206 | 5.160 | Route 21 in Washington State Park | Route 21 in Washington State Park | — | — | |
| Route 104 | — | — | — | — | 1929 | — | |
| Route 105 | 10.534 | 16.953 | Route 80 in East Prairie | I-57 BL / US 62 / Route 77 in Charleston | 1929 | current | |
| Route 106 | 48 | 77 | Route 17 in Summersville | Route 21 in Ellington | 1929 | current | |
| Route 107 | 8.792 | 14.149 | Route 154 in Mark Twain State Park | US 24 southwest of Monroe City | 1929 | current | |
| Route 108 | 5.709 | 9.188 | AR 77 in Arkmo | US 412 near Arbyrd | 1929 | current | |
| Route 109 | 13.128 | 21.127 | Route W / Route FF in Jefferson County | Route CC in Chesterfield | — | — | |
| Route 109 | — | — | — | — | 1929 | — | |
| Route 110 (CKC) | 199.561 | 321.162 | I-35 / I-435 in Claycomo | US 36 / I-72 / IL 110 in Hannibal | 2012 | current | Chicago–Kansas City Expressway |
| Route 110 | 6.385 | 10.276 | Route 21 near De Soto | US 67 near De Soto | 1929 | current | |
| Route 111 | 46.108 | 74.204 | US 59 in Oregon | US 136 in Rock Port | — | — | |
| Route 111 | — | — | — | — | 1929 | — | |
| Route 112 | 17.516 | 28.189 | Route 37 in Seligman | Route 37 / Route 76 / Route 86 in Cassville | 1929 | current | |
| Route 113 | 26 | 42 | US 59 near Mound City | US 136 in Burlington Junction | 1929 | current | |
| Route 114 | 21 | 34 | Route 25 in Dexter | US 61 / US 62 / US 60 Bus. in Sikeston | — | — | |
| Route 114 | — | — | — | — | 1929 | — | |
| Route 115 | 10.255 | 16.504 | I-70 in Berkeley | I-70 in St. Louis | — | — | Locally known as Natural Bridge Road |
| Route 115 | — | — | — | — | 1929 | — | |
| Route 116 | 68 | 109 | US 59 in Rushville | Route A in Braymer | 1929 | current | |
| Route 117 | 0.260 | 0.418 | End of state maintenance at Indian Trail Conversation Area | Route 19 near Salem | 1929 | current | |
| Route 118 | 6.801 | 10.945 | Route 111 near Bigelow | US 59 in Mound City | — | — | |
| Route 118 | — | — | — | — | 1929 | — | |
| Route 119 | 10 | 16 | Montauk State Park entrance | Route 32 in Salem | 1929 | current | |
| Route 120 | 3.132 | 5.040 | US 59 near Oregon | Route B near New Point | 1929 | current | |
| Route 121 | 1.258 | 2.025 | US 69 near Cameron | Route HH in Wallace State Park | — | — | |
| Route 122 | 4.936 | 7.944 | VM Pinnacle Drive in Van Meter State Park | Route 41 near Marshall | — | — | |
| Route 123 | 45.889 | 73.851 | US 160 in Willard | US 54 in Weaubleau | — | — | |
| Route 124 | 36 | 58 | Route 240 near Fayette | Route 22 / Route 151 in Centralia | — | — | |
| Route 125 | 78 | 126 | AR 125 at the Arkansas state line | US 65 in Fair Grove | — | — | |
| Route 126 | 29.226 | 47.035 | K-126 at the Kansas state line | US 160 / Route 37 in Golden City | 1942 | current | |
| Route 127 | 51 | 82 | Route 52 near Sedalia | US 65 near Malta Bend | — | — | |
| Route 128 | 1.215 | 1.955 | Route 146 nearTrenton | Crowder State Park | — | — | |
| Route 129 | 116 | 187 | Route 3 in Roanoke | CR T20 at the Iowa state line | — | — | |
| Route 130 | 6.20 | 9.98 | Route 139 in Laclede | US 36 / Route 139 near Laclede | — | — | |
| Route 131 | 38 | 61 | Route 2 near Medford | Route 224 in Wellington | — | — | |
| Route 132 | — | — | — | — | — | — | |
| Route 133 | 67 | 108 | I-44 near Waynesville | US 63 near Westphalia | — | — | |
| Route 134 | 5.071 | 8.161 | Entrance to Lake of the Ozarks State Park | Route 42 near Osage Beach | — | — | |
| Route 135 | 70 | 110 | Route 5 near Sunrise Beach | I-70 / US 40 / Route 41 near Boonville | — | — | |
| Route 136 | — | — | — | — | — | 1951 | |
| Route 137 | 44 | 71 | US 60 / US 63 / Route 76 in Willow Springs | Route 32 in Licking | — | — | |
| Route 138 | 1.112 | 1.790 | Lakeshore Drive in Lewis and Clark State Park | Route 45 / Route 273 near Iatan | — | — | |
| Route 139 | 107 | 172 | US 24 near Carrollton | CR S40 at the Iowa state line | — | — | |
| Route 140 | — | — | — | — | — | — | |
| Route 141 | 30.902 | 49.732 | US 61 / US 67 in Arnold | Route 370 in Bridgeton | — | — | |
| Route 142 | 130 | 210 | Route 101 in Bakersfield | Route 53 in Poplar Bluff | — | — | |
| Route 143 | 17.507 | 28.175 | Route 34 near Patterson | Route 49 in Des Arc | — | — | |
| Route 144 | 2.956 | 4.757 | Route 32 in Millers | Bauer Road / Park Drive at Hawn State Park | — | — | |
| Route 144 | — | — | — | — | — | — | |
| Route 145 | 3.148 | 5.066 | US 136 near Princeton | Route B | — | — | |
| Route 146 | 28 | 45 | Route 6 near Trenton | US 136 near Bethany | — | — | |
| Route 147 | 2.333 | 3.755 | Route 47 near Troy | Frenchman Bluff Road and Park Road near Troy | — | — | |
| Route 148 | 14.38 | 23.14 | US 136 and US 71 near Maryville | Iowa 148 at the Iowa state line | — | — | |
| Route 148 | — | — | — | — | — | — | |
| Route 148 | — | — | — | — | — | — | |
| Route 149 | 78.9 | 127.0 | US 36 near New Cambria | CR T30 at the Iowa state line. | — | — | |
| Route 150 | 25.666 | 41.305 | Kansas state line (State Line Road/Kenneth Road) in Grandview | Cannon Drive and US 50 in Lone Jack | — | — | |
| Route 151 | 67 | 108 | Route 22 and Route 124 in Centralia | Route 156 near Novelty | — | — | |
| Route 152 | 16.875 | 27.158 | I-435 near Weatherby Lake | I-35 in Liberty | — | — | |
| Route 153 | 45 | 72 | Route 25 in White Oak | US 60 near Grayridge | — | — | |
| Route 154 | 36 | 58 | US 24 near Paris | US 54 near Curryville | — | — | |
| Route 155 | — | — | — | — | — | — | |
| Route 156 | 58 | 93 | Route 149 near South Gifford | Route 6 in Ewing | — | — | |
| Route 157 | 2.721 | 4.379 | — | — | — | — | |
| Route 158 | 5.368 | 8.639 | — | — | — | — | |
| Route 161 | 42.299 | 68.074 | — | — | — | — | |
| Route 162 | 29.767 | 47.905 | Route 25 in Clarkton | Mississippi River near Tiptonville | 1956 | current | |
| Route 163 | 14.323 | 23.051 | — | — | — | — | |
| Route 164 | 38.71 | 62.30 | US 412 in Cardwell | County Road 553/Ferry Landing Road near the Mississippi River in Cottonwood Point | 1956 | current | |
| Route 165 | 12.4 | 20.0 | — | — | — | — | |
| Route 168 | 43 | 69 | — | — | 1956 | current | |
| Route 170 | — | — | — | — | — | — | |
| Route 171 | 26 | 42 | I-49 / US 71 / Route 96 / Route 571 in Carthage | Kansas state line at Opolis, Kansas | — | — | |
| Route 172 | 8.97 | 14.44 | — | — | — | — | |
| Route 173 | 9.260 | 14.903 | — | — | — | — | |
| Route 174 | 20 | 32 | Route 39 in Mount Vernon | US 60 / Route 413 in Republic | — | — | |
| Route 175 | 6.502 | 10.464 | — | — | — | — | |
| Route 175 | — | — | — | — | — | — | |
| Route 176 | 32 | 51 | — | — | — | — | |
| Route 177 | 23.489 | 37.802 | — | — | — | — | |
| Route 178 | — | — | — | — | — | — | |
| Route 179 | 43 | 69 | — | — | — | — | |
| Route 180 | 13.895 | 22.362 | Pennridge Drive in Bridgeton | Page Boulevard / Route D in St. Louis | — | — | |
| Route 181 | 55 | 89 | — | — | — | — | |
| Route 185 | 65 | 105 | — | — | — | — | |
| Route 187 | 2.218 | 3.570 | — | — | — | — | |
| Route 190 | 36 | 58 | — | — | — | — | |
| Route 202 | 8.546 | 13.753 | — | — | — | — | |
| Route 210 | 35 | 56 | — | — | — | — | |
| Route 213 | 6.943 | 11.174 | — | — | — | — | |
| Route 215 | 51 | 82 | — | — | — | — | |
| Route 221 | 16.317 | 26.260 | — | — | — | — | |
| Route 224 | 13 | 21 | — | — | — | — | Missouri Scenic Byway |
| Route 231 | 12.234 | 19.689 | River City Casino Boulevard at the St. Louis city–county line | Jeffco Boulevard / US 61 / US 67 in Arnold | — | — | |
| Route 240 | 52 | 84 | — | — | — | — | |
| Route 242 | 2.304 | 3.708 | — | — | — | — | |
| Route 245 | 16.833 | 27.090 | — | — | — | — | |
| Route 246 | 15.002 | 24.143 | — | — | — | — | |
| Route 248 | 55 | 89 | Route 76 / Route 86 / Route 112 in Cassville | US 65 / US 65 Bus. in Branson | — | — | |
| Route 249 | 6.162 | 9.917 | — | — | — | — | |
| Route 254 | 10.247 | 16.491 | — | — | — | — | |
| Route 265 | 66 | 106 | — | — | — | — | |
| Route 266 | 16.237 | 26.131 | Route 96 west of Halltown | I-44 / I-44 BL in Springfield | — | — | Part of Historic US 66 |
| Route 266 | — | — | — | — | — | — | |
| Route 267 | 4.027 | 6.481 | River City Casino Boulevard at the St. Louis city–county line | US 61 / US 67 near Mehlville | — | — | |
| Route 269 | 3.320 | 5.343 | Front Street in Kansas City | I-35 in Kansas City | — | — | |
| Route 271 | — | — | — | — | — | — | |
| Route 273 | 22 | 35 | Route 92 in Tracy | US 59 / Route 45 at the Kansas state line | — | — | |
| Route 283 | 2.2 | 3.5 | Route 9 in North Kansas City | I-29 / US 71 in Kansas City | — | — | |
| Route 291 | 49.431 | 79.551 | I-49 / US 71 in Harrisonville | I-435 in Kansas City | — | — | |
| Route 340 | 19.726 | 31.746 | Route 100 / Manchester Road in Ellisville | Skinker Boulevard in St. Louis | — | — | |
| Route 350 | 8.589 | 13.823 | 55th Street in Kansas City | I-470 / US 50 in Lee's Summit | — | — | |
| Route 354 | — | — | — | — | 1968 | 1969 | |
| Route 360 | 4 | 6.4 | I-44 west of Springfield | US 60 / Route 413 near Springfield–Republic city limits | — | — | Part of James River Freeway |
| Route 364 | 21.384 | 34.414 | I-64 / US 40 / US 61 in Lake St. Louis | I-270 in Maryland Heights | — | — | |
| Route 366 | 12.000 | 19.312 | Route 30 / Gravois Road in St. Louis | I-44 / US 50 at S. Geyer Road in Sunset Hills | — | — | Part of Historic US 66 |
| Route 367 | 8.960 | 14.420 | I-70 in St. Louis | US 67 in Spanish Lake | — | — | |
| Route 370 | 12.957 | 20.852 | I-70 in St. Peters | I-270 in Bridgeton | — | — | |
| Route 371 | 25 | 40 | Route 273 / I-29 in Tracy | I-29 BL in St. Joseph | — | — | |
| Route 376 | 1.739 | 2.799 | Route 76 in Branson | Route 265 in Branson | — | — | |
| Route 413 | 48.745 | 78.447 | Route 13 / Route 76 / Route 265 in Reeds Spring | Route 13 in Springfield | — | — | |
| Route 465 | — | — | — | — | 2003 | 2020 | |
| Route 571 | 4.484 | 7.216 | I-49 / US 71 | I-49 / US 71 / Route 96 / Route 171 | — | — | |
| Route 725 | 4.400 | 7.081 | — | — | — | — | |
| Route 740 | 6.329 | 10.186 | I-70 / US 40 / Route E in Columbia | Maguire Boulevard in Columbia | — | — | |
| Route 744 | 11.331 | 18.235 | Springfield-Branson Airport in Springfield | I-44 in Springfield | — | — | Part of Historic US 66 |
| Route 750 | 0.450 | 0.724 | — | — | — | — | |
| Route 752 | 3.113 | 5.010 | US 59 / Route U in St. Joseph | I-229 in St. Joseph | — | — | |
| Route 755 | 4 | 6.4 | — | — | — | — | |
| Route 759 | 2.126 | 3.421 | Southwest Lower Lake Road in St. Joseph | I-229 / US 59 in St. Joseph | — | — | |
| Route 763 | 6.771 | 10.897 | Route 740 in Columbia | US 63 north of Columbia | — | — | |
| Route 765 | 2.635 | 4.241 | US 65 in Sedalia | US 65 in Sedalia | 1966 | current | |
| Route 769 | — | — | — | — | 1960 | — | A proposed state highway |
| Route 799 | 0.50 | 0.80 | — | — | — | — | An unsigned designation for the Martin Luther King Jr. Memorial Bridge in St. Louis |

== Special routes ==
| Number | Length (mi) | Length (km) | Southern or western terminus | Northern or eastern terminus | Serves | Formed | Removed | Notes |
|---|---|---|---|---|---|---|---|---|
| Route 1A | 5.1 | 8.2 | — | — | | — | — | Became Route 136 |
| Route 1B | — | — | — | — | | — | — | Proposed |
| Route 1C | 3.5 | 5.6 | — | — | | — | — | Became Route 118 |
| Route 1D | 19 | 31 | — | — | | — | — | |
| Route 1E | 3.132 | 5.040 | — | — | | — | — | Became Route 120 |
| Route 1F | 2.8 | 4.5 | — | — | | — | — | Became Route 111 |
| Route 1F | 5.9 | 9.5 | — | — | | — | — | Became US 66 |
| Route 4A | 3.414 | 5.494 | Evona | Albany | | 1921 | — | Became Route 85 |
| Route 4B | 14.6 | 23.5 | Iowa-Missouri state line | Kahoka | | 1925 | — | Became Route 81 |
| Route 5A | 15 | 24 | — | — | | — | — | Became Route 95 |
| Route 5 Bus. | 2.461 | 3.961 | Route 5 / Route 76 south of Ava | Route 5 / Route 14 / Route 76 at Ava | Ava | — | — | |
| Route 5 Bus. | 4.94 | 7.95 | — | — | Camdenton | — | — | |
| Route 5 Bus. | 2.646 | 4.258 | Route 5 / Route 6 southwest of Milan | Route 5 / Route 6 at Milan | Milan | — | — | |
| Route 7 Bus. | 1.671 | 2.689 | Route 7 / Route 58 at Pleasant Hill | Route 7 in Pleasant Hill | Pleasant Hill | — | — | |
| Route 9A | 13 | 21 | — | — | | — | — | Became Route 56; Route 56 changed to Route 168 when US 56 came to Missouri |
| Route 10 Bus. | 5.410 | 8.707 | Route 10 west of Richmond | Route 10 east of Richmond | Richmond | — | — | |
| Route 12A | 12 | 19 | — | — | | — | — | Became Route 87 |
| Route 12B | 18 | 29 | — | — | | — | — | Became Route 89 |
| Route 13 Bus. | 3.147 | 5.065 | Route 13 / Route 123 south of Humansville | Route 13 at Humansville | Humansville | — | — | |
| Route 13 Bus. | 5.049 | 8.126 | Route 13 / Route 83 at Bolivar | Route 13 / Route 32 at Bolivar | Bolivar | — | — | |
| Route 13 Bus. | 8.301 | 13.359 | Route 13 south of Warrensburg | Route 13 north of Warrensburg | Warrensburg | — | — | |
| Route 13 Bus. | 2.05 | 3.30 | — | — | Branson West | — | — | |
| Route 13 Bus. | 3.53 | 5.68 | — | — | Clinton | — | — | |
| Route 13 Bus. | 2.81 | 4.52 | — | — | Collins | — | — | |
| Route 13 Bus. | 4.22 | 6.79 | — | — | Higginsville | — | — | |
| Route 13 Bus. | 6.635 | 10.678 | Route 13 southeast of Lexington | US 24 / Route 13 at Lexington | Lexington | — | — | |
| Route 13 Spur | 0.362 | 0.583 | Route 224 in Lexington | Battle of Lexington State Historic Site | Battle of Lexington State Historic Site | — | — | |
| Route 13 Bus. | 1.895 | 3.050 | Route 82 at Osceola | Route 13 at Osceola | Osceola | — | — | |
| Route 13 Bus. | 1.564 | 2.517 | Route 13 at Richmond | Route 10 Bus. / Route 13 in Richmond | Richmond | — | — | |
| Route 15 Spur | 1.28 | 2.06 | — | — | Paris | — | — | |
| Route 17A | 5.01 | 8.06 | — | — | Plato | — | — | |
| Route 19A | — | — | — | — | | — | — | |
| Route 21A | — | — | — | — | | — | — | |
| Route 21 Alt. | 5.22 | 8.40 | Route 21 in DeSoto | Route 21 in DeSoto | DeSoto | — | — | |
| Route 21 Bus. | 2.49 | 4.01 | — | — | Hillsboro | — | — | |
| Route 25 Bus. | 3.231 | 5.200 | US 62 / Route 25 at Malden | Route 25 at Malden | Malden | — | — | |
| Route 32 Bus. | 3.148 | 5.066 | Route 32 at Park Hills | Route 32 at Park Hills | Park Hills | — | — | |
| Route 33A | 6.8 | 10.9 | — | — | | — | — | Became Route 116 |
| Route 34 Spur | 0.89 | 1.43 | — | — | Jackson | — | — | |
| Route 37 Bus. | 1.69 | 2.72 | — | — | Butterfield | — | — | |
| Route 37 Bus. | 4.612 | 7.422 | Route 37 / Route 76 / Route 86 / Route 112 at Cassville | Route 37 north of Cassville | Cassville | — | — | |
| Route 37 Bus. | 2.44 | 3.93 | — | — | Purdy | — | — | |
| Route 37 Bus. | 1.845 | 2.969 | Route 37 at Seligman | Route 37 at Seligman | Seligman | — | — | |
| Route 38N | — | — | — | — | | — | — | |
| Route 39 Bus. | 2.164 | 3.483 | I-44 BL / Route 39 at Mount Vernon | Route 39 / Route 174 at Mount Vernon | Mount Vernon | — | — | |
| Route 41 Spur | 0.410 | 0.660 | Route 41 at Arrow Rock | Main Street in Arrow Rock | Arrow Rock | — | — | |
| Route 41 Spur | 0.666 | 1.072 | Route 41 at Miami | Wall Street in Miami | Miami | — | — | |
| Route 43 Truck | 1.97 | 3.17 | US 60 at Seneca | MO 43 at Seneca | Seneca | — | — | Route 43 Truck bypasses a steep grade just south of Seneca. |
| Route 49A | — | — | — | — | | — | — | |
| Route 51A | 24 | 39 | — | — | | — | — | Became Route 51 |
| Route 52A | 1.3 | 2.1 | — | — | | — | — | Became Route 45 |
| Route 52 Bus. | 1.890 | 3.042 | Route 52 at Deepwater | Route 13 / Route 52 near Deepwater | Deepwater | — | — | |
| Route 54A | 5.3 | 8.5 | — | — | | — | — | Became Route 19 |
| Route 55A | 10 | 16 | — | — | | — | — | Became Route 105 |
| Route 58 Spur | 0.257 | 0.414 | Main Street in Centerview | Route 58 at Centerview | Centerview | — | — | |
| Route 64A | 9 | 14 | — | — | | — | — | Became Route 83 |
| Route 64A | 1.509 | 2.429 | Bennett Springs State Park Road 22 | Route 64 | | — | — | |
| Route 64B | 2.257 | 3.632 | Pomme de Terre State Park | Route 64 | | — | — | |
| Route 76A | 32.606 | 52.474 | — | — | | — | — | Became Route 176 |
| Route 84 Spur | 0.291 | 0.468 | Route 84 at Caruthersville | 3rd Street in Caruthersville | Caruthersville | — | — | |
| Route 89 Spur | 1.620 | 2.607 | US 50 east of Potts | Route 89 northeast of Potts | Osage County | — | — | Commonly referred to as Route 89Y as well |
| Route 92 Spur | 0.217 | 0.349 | Route 273 at Tracy | Route 92 in Tracy | Tracy | — | — | Runs concurrently with Spur 273 |
| Route 106 Spur | 1.359 | 2.187 | Deer Run State Forest | Route 106 west of Ellington | Deer Run State Forest | — | — | |
| Route 111 Spur | 0.561 | 0.903 | Route 111 in Craig | US 59 in Craig | Craig | — | — | |
| Route 112 Spur | 0.381 | 0.613 | Route 112 south of Cassville | Roaring River State Park | Roaring River State Park | — | — | |
| Route 124 Bus. | 0.991 | 1.595 | Route 124 at Centralia | Route 22 at Centralia | Centralia | — | — | |
| Route 180 Spur | 0.867 | 1.395 | Route D in Pagedale | Route 180 in Pagedale | Pagedale | — | — | |
| Route 185 Spur | 2.211 | 3.558 | Route 185 east of Sullivan | Meramec State Park | Meramec State Park | — | — | |
| Route 215 Spur | 0.267 | 0.430 | Route 13 / Route 215 near Brighton | Route F near Brighton | Brighton | — | — | |
| Route 240 Alt. | 0.789 | 1.270 | US 40 west of Rocheport | Route 240 northwest of Rocheport | Howard County | — | — | |
| Route 240 Bus. | 4.858 | 7.818 | Route 5 / Route 87 / Route 240 in Glasgow | Route 5 / Route 240 east of Glasgow | Glasgow | — | — | |
| Route 240 Spur | 1.091 | 1.756 | 3rd Street in Rocheport | US 40 north of Rocheport | Rocheport | — | — | |
| Route 269 Temp. | — | — | — | — | Kansas City | 1956 | 1957 | |
| Route 273 Spur | 0.217 | 0.349 | Route 273 at Tracy | Route 92 in Tracy | Tracy | — | — | Runs concurrently with Spur 92 |

== Former ==
The old cut-out style markers once used in Missouri.

From 1922 until 1931, the Missouri Highway System was marked with oval cast iron markers with an orange background and black lettering.

In 1926, the U.S. Highway System was created, and many of the highways listed below presently part of a new U.S. Highway; in some cases, a highway's number was changed so as not to conflict with a U.S. Highway number (or, later, an Interstate Highway number) which came through Missouri.

This is a list of former highways as approved in 1922. All numbers from Route 1 to Route 72 were issued. From Route 72 to Route 98, only even numbers were issued.

- Route 1, Arkansas to Iowa through western Missouri via Kansas City; presently US 59 and US 71
  - Route 1A, Rock Port to Phelps City; presently US 136
  - Route 1B, branch from Route 1 to Craig; presently US 59
  - Route 1C, Mound City to Bigelow; presently Route 118
  - Route 1D, branch from Route 1 towards Skidmore via Maitland; presently Route 113
  - Route 1E, branch from Route 1 to New Point; presently Route 120
  - Route 1F, Oregon to Forest City; presently Route 111
  - Route 1F, Joplin to Kansas; presently Route 66
- Route 2, Kansas City to St. Louis via Columbia; presently US 40
- Route 3, Arkansas to Iowa via Springfield; presently US 65
- Route 4, St. Joseph to Alexandria; presently US 136 and US 169
  - Route 4A, Albany to Evona; presently Route 85
- Route 5, Arkansas to Iowa via Boonville; still extant
  - Route 5A, Wasola to Longrun; presently Route 95
- Route 6, St. Joseph to Canton; still extant west of New Court Village, Route 16 comprises the remainder
- Route 7, Arkansas to Iowa via Jefferson City; presently US 63
- Route 8, St. Joseph to Hannibal; presently US 36
- Route 9, Arkansas to Iowa via St. Louis; presently US 61 and Route 81
  - Route 9A, Palmyra to Philadelphia; presently Route 168
- Route 10, Kansas City to Monroe City; still extant west of Carrollton, US 24 comprises the remainder
- Route 11, Kansas City to Iowa; presently US 69
- Route 12, Kansas City to St. Louis via Jefferson City; presently US 50
  - Route 12A, California to Jamestown; presently Route 87
  - Route 12B, branch from Route 12 to Chamois; presently Route 89
- Route 13, Buffalo to Gallatin; still extant north of Bolivar, Route 32 comprises the remainder
- Route 14, Carthage to St. Louis; presently Route 96, Route 266, and I-44
- Route 15, Buffalo to Iowa via Jefferson City; still extant north of Mexico, Route 73 and US 54 comprise the remainder
- Route 16, Oklahoma to Kentucky via Springfield; presently US 60
- Route 17, Mountain View to Eugene; still extant
- Route 18, Tarkio to Stanberry; presently US 136
- Route 19, Thayer to Cuba; still extant
- Route 20, Kansas City to Huntsville; presently US 24, Route 240, and Route 3
- Route 21, Arkansas to De Soto; still extant
- Route 22, Clark to Louisiana; still extant west of Mexico, US 54 comprises the remainder
- Route 23, Arkansas to Fredericktown; presently US 67
- Route 24, Kansas to Tuscumbia; presently Route 52
- Route 25, Arkansas to Festus; still extant between Kennett and Jackson, US 61 and US 412 comprise the remainder
- Route 26, Kansas to Osceola; presently Route 82 and US 54
- Route 27, Savannah to Iowa; presently US 71 and Route 148
- Route 28, Waynesville to Rosebud; still extant
- Route 29, Stanberry to Iowa; presently US 169
- Route 30, St. Clair to St. Louis; still extant
- Route 31, Clarksdale to King City; still extant to US 169, with US 169 comprising the remainder
- Route 32, Licking to Flat River; still extant
- Route 33, Kansas City to Osborn; still extant
  - Route 33A, Plattsburg to Lathrop; presently Route 116
- Route 34, Garwood to Jackson; still extant
- Route 35, Harrisonville to Kansas City; presently US 71
- Route 36, Kansas to Springfield; presently US 160
- Route 37, Arkansas to Monett; still extant
- Route 38, Carthage to Republic; presently US 71, I-44, and Route 174
- Route 39, Pennsboro to Stockton; still extant
- Route 40, Billings to near Siloam Springs; presently Route 14
- Route 41, Lamine to Miami; still extant
- Route 42, Alton to near Poplar Bluff; presently US 160
- Route 43, Arkansas to Marionville; presently Route 13
- Route 44, Anderson to Spokane; presently Route 76
- Route 45, Drake to Martinsburg; presently Route 19
- Route 46, through Grant City; still extant
- Route 47, Villa Ridge to Troy; still extant
- Route 48, Rosendale to King City; still extant
- Route 49, Piedmont to Glover; still extant
- Route 50, St. Joseph to Grayson; presently US 169
- Route 51, Advance to Illinois; still extant
  - Route 51A, Dongola to Puxico; presently Route 51
- Route 52, Kansas to St. Joseph; presently US 59
  - Route 52A, branch to Lewis and Clark Lake; presently Route 45
- Route 53, Kennett to Poplar Bluff; still extant
- Route 54, Paris to New London; presently Route 26; now Routes 154 and 19
  - Route 54A, Perry to Hutchison; presently Route 19
- Route 55, Wolf Island to Benton; presently Route 77
  - Route 55A, Charleston to East Prairie; presently Route 105
- Route 56, Troy to O'Fallon; presently Routes 47 and 79
- Route 57, Webb City to Kansas; presently Route 171
- Route 58, Pleasant Hill to Warrensburg; still extant
- Route 59, Kansas City to Platte City; presently Route 9
- Route 60, Leeton to Windsor; presently Route 2
- Route 61, Tarkio to Iowa; presently Route 9 and later presently US 59
- Route 62, Steelville to Potosi; presently Route 8
- Route 63, Harrisonville to Lees Summit; presently Route 7
- Route 64, Collins to Preston; still extant east of Hermitage
  - Route 64A, Wheatland to Quincy; presently Route 83
- Route 65, St. James to Hawkins Store; presently Route 68
- Route 66, El Dorado Springs to Fair Play; presently US 54; now Route 32
- Route 67, Rocheport to Fayette; presently Route 3; now Route 240
- Route 68, Farmington to Sainte Genevieve; presently Route 32
- Route 69, Springfield to Bolivar; presently Route 13
- Route 70, Ironton to Fredericktown; presently Route 72
- Route 71, Springfield to Preston; absorbed by Route 3 (US 65) when its portion here was not built
- Route 72, Salem to Centerville; still extant
- Route 74, Dutchtown to Cape Girardeau; still extant
- Route 76, Spokane to Forsyth; swapped with Route 80 (now US 160); still extant
- Route 78, Branson to Brownbranch; presently Route 76 and Route 80 (this section later presently part of Route 76)
- Route 80, Gainesville to West Plains; presently US 160
- Route 82, Malden to New Madrid; presently US 62
- Route 84, Arkansas to Caruthersville; still extant
- Route 86, Blue Eye to Hollister; still extant
- Route 88, Lanagan to Arkansas; presently US 71 when Route 59 was formed
- Route 90, Oklahoma to Noel; still extant
- Route 92, Kansas to Smithville; still extant
- Route 94, St. Charles to West Alton; still extant
- Route 96, Odessa to Marshall; not built, but now partly Route 20
- Route 98, Boonville to Overton; still extant
