= Missouri Route 102 =

State highway in Missouri, U.S.

Route 102
- Route 102 highlighted in green

Route information
- Maintained by MoDOT
- Length: 17.349 mi (27.921 km)
- Existed: 1930 – 1933; 1940–present

Major junctions
- West end: Route 105 near East Prairie
- East end: Route 77 in Dorena

Location
- Country: United States
- State: Missouri
- Counties: Mississippi

Highway system
- Missouri State Highway System; Interstate; US; State; Supplemental
← Route 101	→ Route 103

Route 102 is a highway in southeastern Missouri. The route starts at Route 105 near East Prairie. It travels southeastwards through farmland to Big Oak Tree State Park. The road then turns east past the entrance to the park, and ends at its eastern terminus at Route 77 in Dorena. The route was designated in 1940, as a road from the state park to a supplemental route. Route 102 replaced a large section of the supplemental route in 1961, and then was extended eastwards to a new terminus at Route 77 in 1994.

== Route description ==
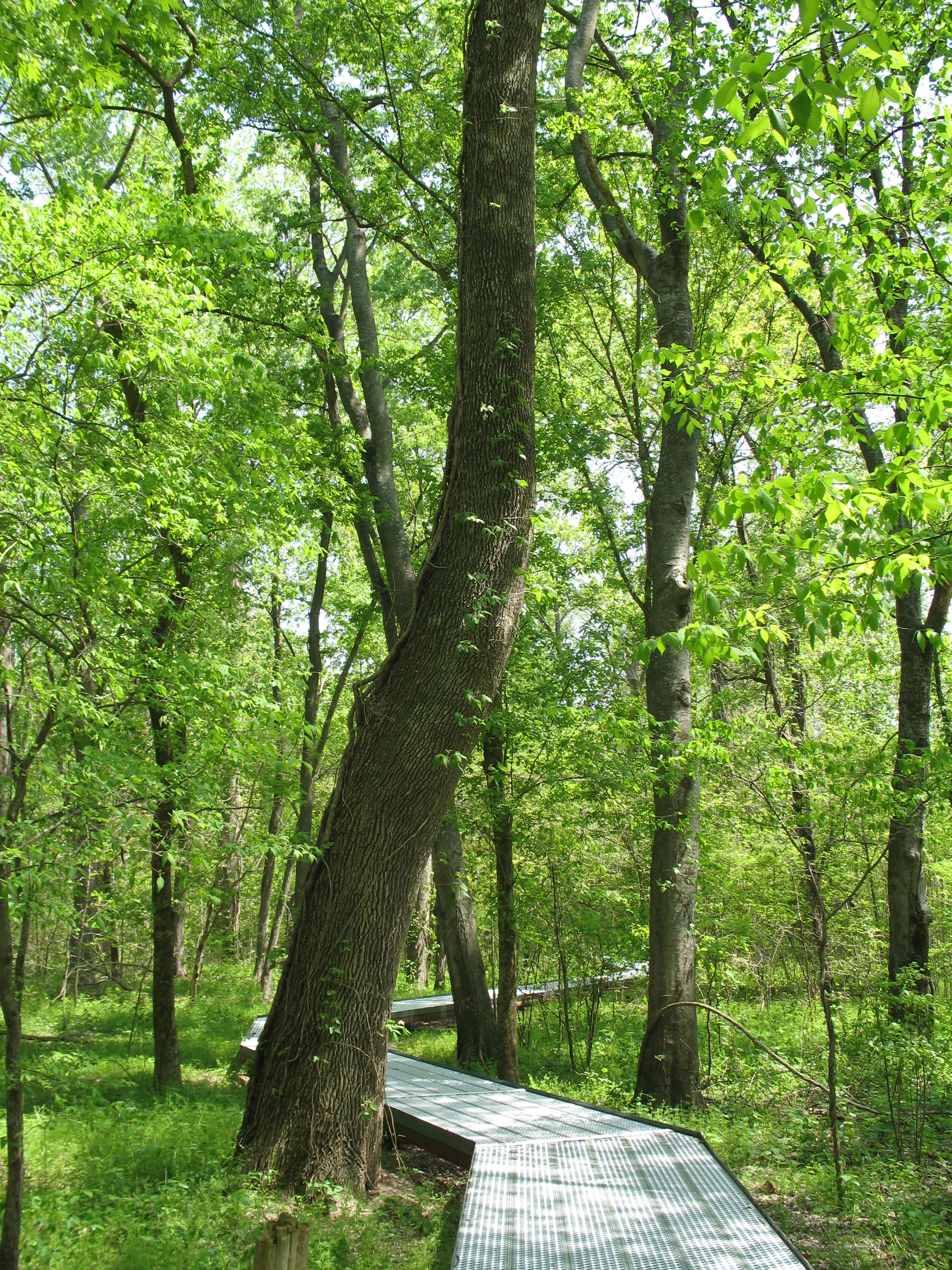
Big Oak Tree State Park

All of the route is located in Mississippi County. In 2016, Missouri Department of Transportation (MoDOT) calculated as many as 894 vehicles traveling on Route 102 east of Route 105, and as few as 222 vehicles, including 104 trucks, traveling east of Route RB. This is expressed in terms of annual average daily traffic (AADT), a measure of traffic volume for any average day of the year. Although the route is signed as an east–west route, it primarily travels north–south.

Route 102 begins at a three-way junction with Route 105 in the unincorporated community of Airline Acres. The road begins to travel south through the community and farmland. It intersects County Road 334 (CRD 334) and CRD 422 less than one mile (1.6 km) from its western terminus. The route intersects Missouri Route 80, which leads to East Prairie. Route 102 then crosses over a spillway ditch near CRD 528, and it turns southeastward at CRD 521. The road borders the Ten Mile Pond Conservation Area, and access to the area is provided by Route VV via CRD 518. North of the eastern terminus of CRD 521, the road travels south briefly and intersects CRD 521 again before turning east. The road meets Route YY, a short route that leads to Route FF, at a three-way junction before traveling southeastward. Just east of Big Oak Tree State Park, the road to the entrance of the park, Route RB, intersects Route 102 and CRD 508. Route 102 then travels south to its intersection with Route A at Three States, where it travels eastward from that point. About two miles (3.2 km) later, the route travels to its eastern terminus at Route 77 and CRD 510 in Dorena. The Dorena–Hickman Ferry is located southeast of the intersection, at the southern terminus of Route 77.

== History ==
The designation was previously used for a short route from Phelps City to Rock Port in Atchison County. In 1926, a stretch of road between the two cities was designated as Route 1A. The route was renumbered to Route 102 by 1930, and a project to begin the paving of gravel, which cost $96,800 (equivalent to $1,865,618 in 2025), started in April of that year. About three years later, Route 102 was renumbered to Route 4, with the project completed. Route 4 was then later renumbered to U.S. Route 136 in 1951.

The current version of the route could be traced back to a supplemental route. Route A was constructed by 1934, as a gravel road from Dorena to Route Y near East Prairie. About five years later, a project to construct a road, designated as Route 102-AP, from Big Oak Tree State Park to Route A was completed. The road appeared on the state map by 1940 as Route 102. Route A was extended northwards from Route Y to Route 105 by 1953, with the section already paved. Another supplemental route, Route PP, was constructed from Route A to Route 55 by 1955. Routes A, PP, and 102 were completely paved by one year later. By 1961, Route 102 replaced Route A from the park entrance westward. The route was repaved near East Prairie in 1965. Route 102 was extended south by 1994, with its new eastern terminus at Route 77 near Dorena. The road from the state park to Route 102 was given the designation of Route RB, and Route PP was replaced by Route 102. The western terminus of Route A was truncated to its intersection with Route 102 south of the state park.

== Major intersections ==
The entire route is in Mississippi County.

Location	mi	km	Destinations	Notes
Airline Acres	0.000	0.000	Route 105	Western terminus
	1.886	3.035	Route 80	
	11.080	17.832	Route YY	Western terminus of Route YY
	13.268	21.353	Route RB – Big Oak Tree State Park	Eastern terminus of Route RB
Three States	15.201	24.464	Route A	Eastern terminus of Route A
Dorena	17.349	27.921	Route 77 – Dorena–Hickman Ferry	Eastern terminus
1.000 mi = 1.609 km; 1.000 km = 0.621 mi
