= Missouri Route 75 =

State highway in Missouri, U.S.

Route 75
- Route 75 highlighted in red

Route information
- Maintained by MoDOT
- Length: 5.567 mi (8.959 km)
- Existed: 1968–present

Major junctions
- South end: Route 80 east of East Prairie
- North end: Route 105 west of Anniston

Location
- Country: United States
- State: Missouri
- Counties: Mississippi

Highway system
- Missouri State Highway System; Interstate; US; State; Supplemental
← Route 74	→ Route 76

Route 75 is a short highway in Mississippi County in the U.S. state of Missouri. Its southern terminus is at Route 80, and it travels north through farmland to the town of Anniston. It then travels westward to its northern terminus at Route 105 north of East Prairie. The route was designated in 1968, after Route 77 was moved to a new alignment east of Anniston, and the remaining section was renumbered to Route 75.

== Route description ==
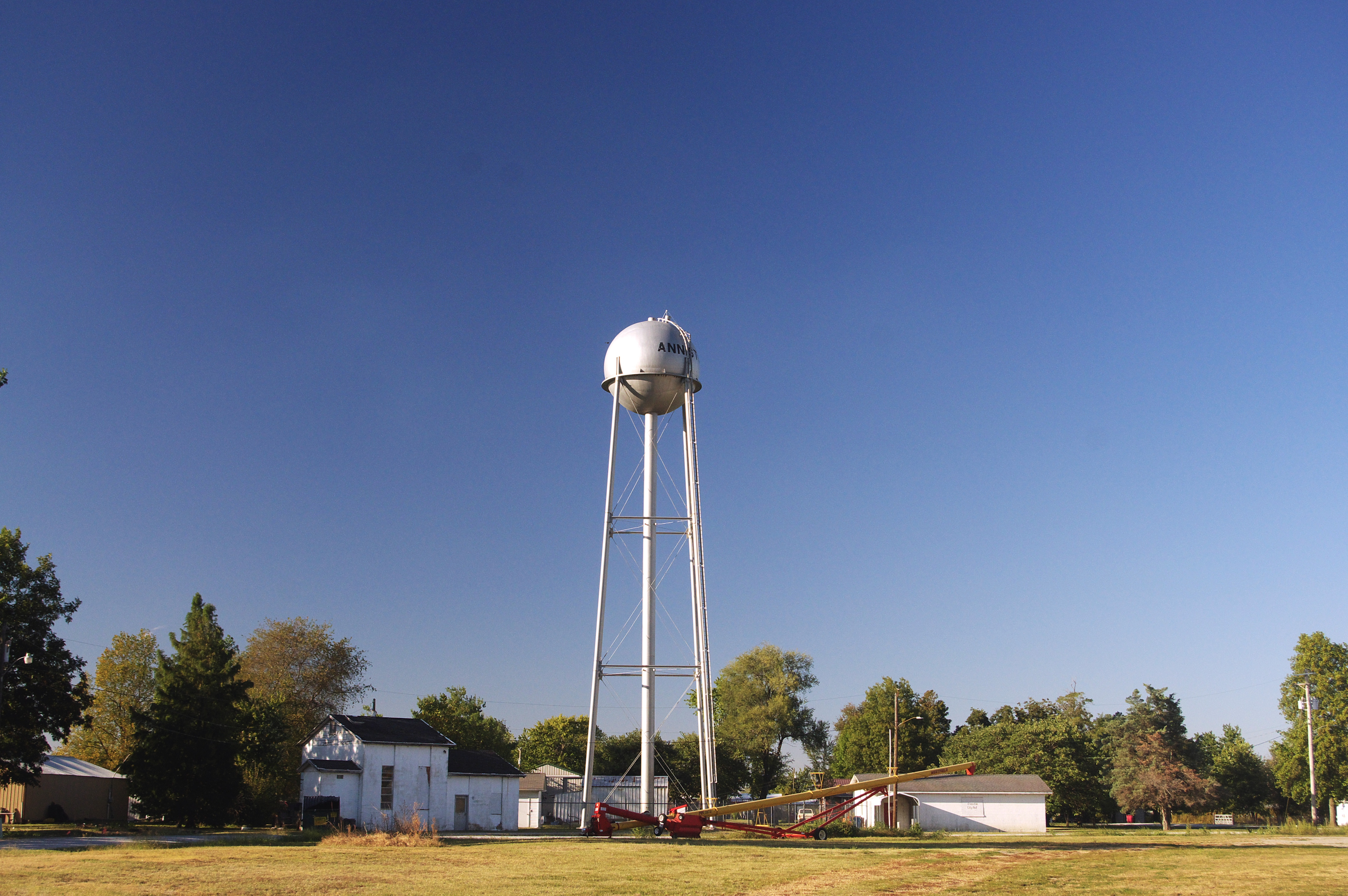
Water tower in Anniston

All of the route is in Mississippi County. In 2015, the Missouri Department of Transportation (MoDOT) measured about 796 vehicles, including 66 trucks, traveling on the route near Anniston on average each day.

Route 75 starts at a T intersection at Route 80 east of East Prairie, and it travels north through farmland as a two-lane road. The road intersects County Road 334 (CRD 334) and crosses over Intercept Ditch. It intersects CRD 332 after crossing over the ditch, and it turns west at the western and southern termini of Route DD and CRD 337, respectively. Route 75 then enters the city of Anniston, crossing over the White Pond inside the city limits. At Kaycee Lane (CRD 341), the road turns north towards the center of the city, where it intersects CRD 328 and other streets. Route 75 turns west at B Street (CRD 339), leaving the city limits. The route re-enters the farmland, intersecting CRD 343. It then crosses over the Wolf Hole Lateral, and ends at another T intersection at Route 105, south of the Mississippi County Airport.

== History ==
The road that became Route 75 has existed since 1926, as part of Route 55 from south of Charleston to east of East Prairie. The route was renumbered to Route 77 in 1959, and it was rerouted in 1968. The realignment replaced Route E with Route 77, and its old alignment became part of Route 88 and Route 105. The section that traveled through Anniston was renumbered to Route 75.

== Major intersections ==
The entire route is in Mississippi County.

Location	mi	km	Destinations	Notes
	0.000	0.000	Route 80	Southern terminus
	3.029	4.875	Route DD	Western terminus of Route DD
	5.567	8.959	Route 105	Northern terminus
1.000 mi = 1.609 km; 1.000 km = 0.621 mi

== See also ==
- List of state highways in Missouri
