= Missouri Route 101 =

State highway in Missouri, U.S.

Route 101
- Route 101 highlighted in pink

Route information
- Maintained by MoDOT
- Length: 11.626 mi (18.710 km)
- Existed: 1941–present

Major junctions
- South end: AR 101 at the Arkansas state line near Thuroy
- Route 142 in Bakersfield
- North end: US 160 in Caulfield

Location
- Country: United States
- State: Missouri
- Counties: Ozark, Howell

Highway system
- Missouri State Highway System; Interstate; US; State; Supplemental
← Route 100	→ Route 102

Route 101 is a short highway in southern Missouri. The route begins at the Arkansas–Missouri state line as a continuation of Arkansas Highway 101, and travels northeastward. It travels through the city of Bakersfield, intersecting Route 142. The road then continues north to its northern terminus at U.S. Route 160 (US 160) in Caulfield. The route was designated in 1941, after a supplementary route was renumbered.

== Route description ==
The route is located in Ozark and Howell counties. In 2015, Missouri Department of Transportation (MoDOT) calculated as many as 1,566 vehicles traveling on Route 101 south of US 160, and as few as 1258 vehicles traveling north of the Arkansas–Missouri state line. This is expressed in terms of annual average daily traffic (AADT), a measure of traffic volume for any average day of the year.

Route 101 begins at the Arkansas–Missouri state line as a continuation of Arkansas Highway 101. The road travels through a forest and parallel to the state line for the first 0.5 miles (0.80 km). At CRD 588, the route turns northeastward, intersecting a few driveways until it reaches CRD 586, where it turns northward past the intersection. Route 101 travels eastward before it intersects CRD 584, and enters the corporate limits of Bakersfield at CRD 585. The route briefly travels north and intersects Route O, which leads to the unincorporated area of Udall. The road enters the center of the city at Main Street and curves northward at the western terminus of Route 142. Route 101 leaves the city north of Starks. The road enters through a mix of farmland and forests as it continued through southeast Ozark County. At CRD 101-174, the route begins to turn northeastward and later intersects CRD 597. Route 101 crosses the county line at CRD 7890, and enters Howell County. Once inside the county, the route turns north at Route YY and intersects CRD 7690. The road turns to the northeast in the community of Caulfield, and ends at US 160 in a T-intersection.

== History ==
The designation was first used for another route in Wayne County in 1937, for a gravel road that connected from Route 34 to Sam A. Baker State Park. The route was renumbered to Route 143 by 1941.

For the current designation, Route M was designated to a gravel road in 1932 that started from the state line to Route 80, passing through Bakersfield. It was renumbered to Route 101 in 1941, part of many changes made by the Missouri State Highway Commission. All of the route was paved by 1953. Around 1954, Route 101 was realigned west of Bakersfield, shifting the southern terminus to the west. US 160 replaced the Route 80 designation in the same year.

== Major intersections ==
County	Location	mi	km	Destinations	Notes
Ozark		0.000	0.000	AR 101 south – Gamaliel	Continuation into Arkansas
Ozark	Bakersfield	3.717	5.982	Route O west – Udall	Eastern terminus of Route O
Ozark	Bakersfield	4.246	6.833	Route 142 east to Route AR south / AR 87 south	Western terminus of Route 142
Howell		9.369	15.078	Route YY south	Northern terminus of Route YY
Howell	Caulfield	11.626	18.710	US 160	Northern terminus
1.000 mi = 1.609 km; 1.000 km = 0.621 mi
