= Dorena =

Dorena may refer to:

- Dorena, Missouri, a community in the U.S. state of Missouri
- Dorena, Oregon, a community in the U.S. state of Oregon
