= Missouri Route 103 =

State highway in Missouri, U.S.

Route 103
- Route 103 highlighted in cyan

Route information
- Maintained by MoDOT
- Length: 3.832 mi (6.167 km)
- Existed: c. 1933–present

Major junctions
- South end: Route Z at the Ozark National Scenic Riverways
- North end: US 60 near Van Buren

Location
- Country: United States
- State: Missouri

Highway system
- Missouri State Highway System; Interstate; US; State; Supplemental
← Route 102	→ Route 104

Route 103 is a short highway in southeastern Missouri. Its southern terminus is at Route Z inside the Ozark National Scenic Riverways. The route travels north and intersects a few county roads as it leaves the national park. The road ends at U.S. Route 60 in a three-way junction. After being proposed in 1930, a road was built from the national park to US 60 in 1933. The gravel road was designated as Route 103, and it was paved five years later.

== Route description ==
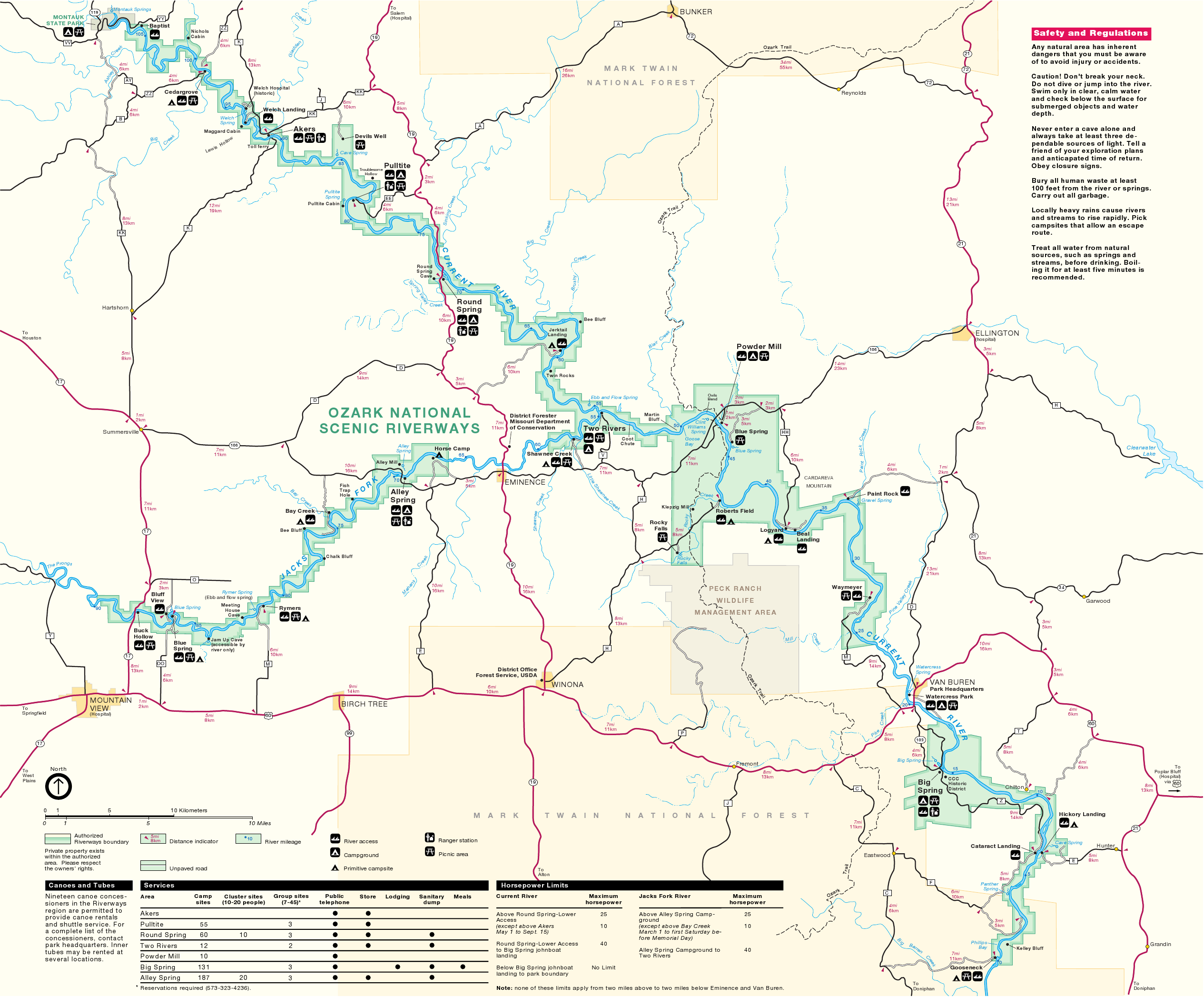
Map of the Ozark National Scenic Riverways, with Route 103 marked on the southeast portion of the map

All of the route is located in Carter County. In 2016, the Missouri Department of Transportation (MoDOT) calculated 267 vehicles, including 29 trucks travelling on Route 103 north of its southern terminus. This is expressed in terms of annual average daily traffic (AADT), a measure of traffic volume for any average day of the year.

Route 103 begins at the intersection of Peavine Road and Route Z inside the Ozark National Scenic Riverways, at the Big Spring Historic District. The road travels westward through the forest, and it curves northward near the southern terminus of Skyline Drive. The route then intersects the eastern terminus of County Road 202 (CRD 202) north of Skyline Drive. About one mile (1.6 km) past CRD 202, Route 103 leaves the national park, and it meets the northern ends of Skyline Drive and Peavine Road. The road shifts to the northeast, and intersects a road leading to the unincorporated area of Chicopee. The road ends at US 60 in South Van Buren at a three-way junction south of Current River and the city of Van Buren.

== History ==
Around 1930, a road was proposed to start from the Ozark National Scenic Riverways to US 60 as a park connection. The gravel road was constructed by 1933, and it was designated as Route 103. The route was paved by 1938, as part of a larger project with a cost of $836,300 (equivalent to $18,729,635 in 2025), with a fraction going to Route 103's improvement. In 1959, a project was announced to establish a supplemental route, Route Z, that would start at the southern terminus of Route 103. The route was built as a gravel road by 1961, and it was paved around nine years later.

== Major intersections ==
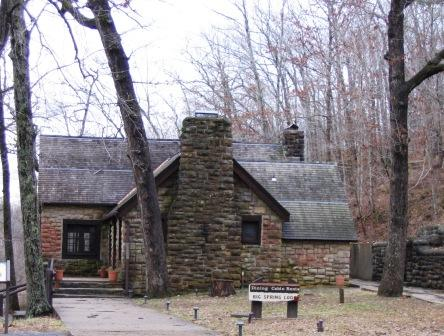
Big Spring Lodge, a contributing building inside the Big Spring Historic District

The entire route is in Carter County.

Location	mi	km	Destinations	Notes
Big Spring Historic District	0.000	0.000	Route Z / Peavine Road	Southern terminus at T-intersection
South Van Buren	3.811– 3.832	6.133– 6.167	US 60 – Winona, Van Buren	Northern terminus
1.000 mi = 1.609 km; 1.000 km = 0.621 mi
