= Missouri Route 80 =

State highway in Missouri, U.S.

Route 80

Route information
- Maintained by MoDOT
- Length: 27.302 mi (43.938 km)

Major junctions
- West end: US 61 / US 62 / Route H near Matthews
- I-55 near Matthews
- East end: Dead End at the Mississippi River in Belmont

Location
- Country: United States
- State: Missouri

Highway system
- Missouri State Highway System; Interstate; US; State; Supplemental
← Route 79	→ Route 81

Route 80 is a state highway in southeastern Missouri. The route is located in northern New Madrid and central Mississippi Counties.

== Route description ==
Route 80's western terminus is at U.S. Route 61/62 near Matthews, which is located midway between Sikeston and New Madrid, with a junction with I-55 located about a mile (1.6 km) to the east. East Prairie is the only other town on the highway. Its eastern terminus is a dead end at the Mississippi River in Belmont.

== History ==
At Belmont, there used to be a ferry connecting Route 80 to Kentucky Route 80, which is a major east–west thoroughfare across southern Kentucky, continuing into Virginia, as Virginia State Route 80. The toll ferry service was discontinued in 1984.

== Major intersections ==
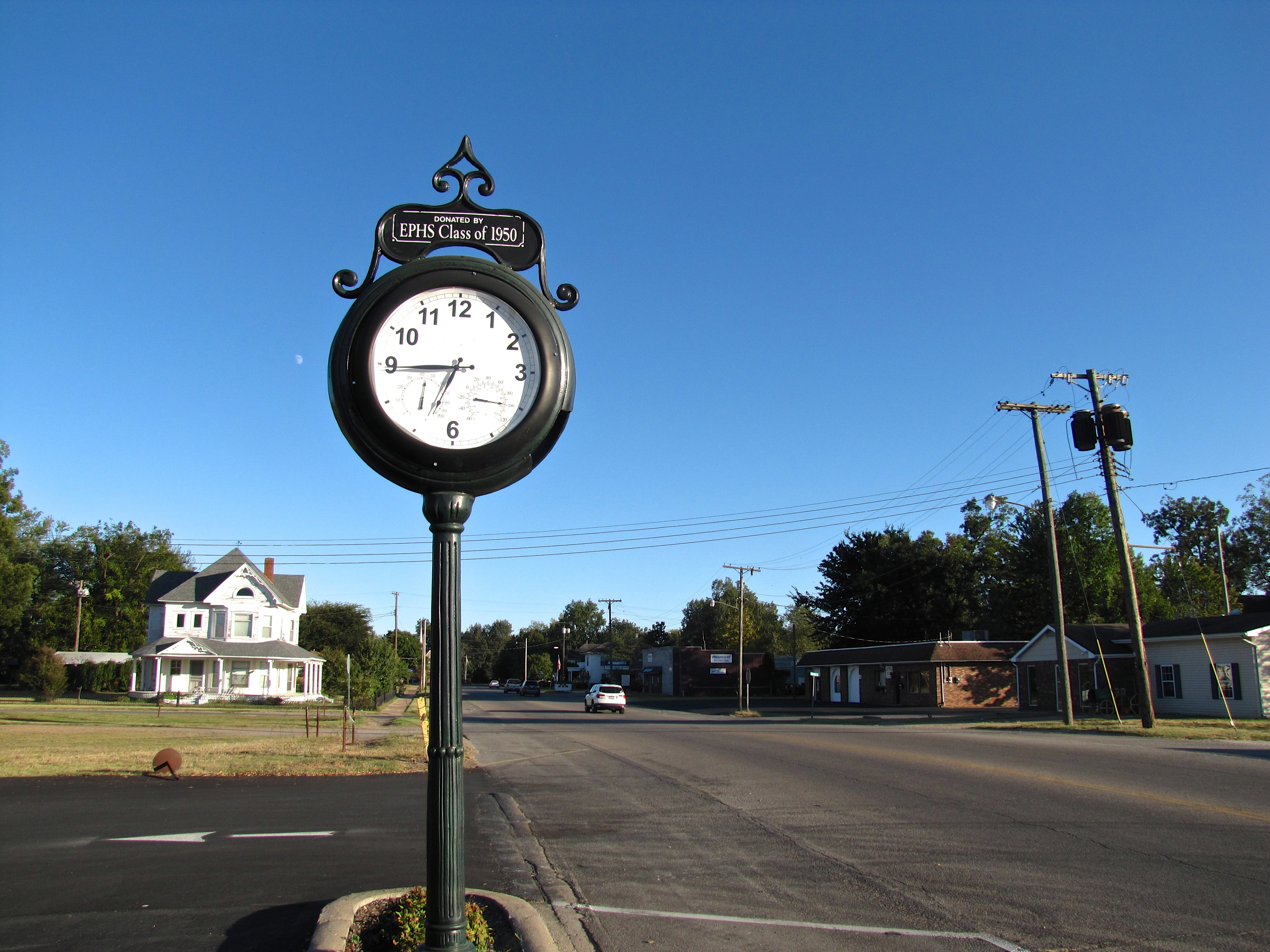
Route 80 in East Prairie

County	Location	mi	km	Destinations	Notes
New Madrid		0.000	0.000	US 61 / US 62 / Route H – Matthews, New Madrid, Sikeston	Western terminus; Eastern terminus of Route H
New Madrid		1.505– 1.596	2.422– 2.569	I-55 – Sikeston, Blytheville, AR	Diamond interchange
New Madrid		1.634	2.630	Route V	Northern terminus of Route V
New Madrid		2.566	4.130	Route AA – Miner	Southern terminus of Route AA
New Madrid–Mississippi county line		8.058	12.968	Route B – Bertrand	Southern terminus of Route B
Mississippi		10.052	16.177	Route BB	Northern terminus of Route BB
Mississippi	East Prairie	11.171	17.978	Route 105 – Charleston	Southern terminus of Route 105
Mississippi		13.236	21.301	Route 102 – Charleston	
Mississippi		15.263	24.563	Route 75 – Anniston	Southern terminus of Route 75
Mississippi		17.817	28.674	Route AA	Northern terminus of Route AA
Mississippi		21.312	34.298	Route 77 – Wyatt, Wolf Island	
Mississippi		27.302	43.938	Belmont–Columbus Ferry	Former ferry, currently a dead end
1.000 mi = 1.609 km; 1.000 km = 0.621 mi: Closed/former

== See also ==
- List of state highways in Missouri
