= Missouri Route 121 =

State highway in Missouri, U.S.

Route 121
- Route 121 highlighted in red

Route information
- Maintained by MoDOT
- Length: 1.258 mi (2.025 km)
- Existed: c. 1936–present

Major junctions
- South end: US 69 south of Cameron
- North end: Route HH in Wallace State Park

Location
- Country: United States
- State: Missouri
- Counties: Clinton

Highway system
- Missouri State Highway System; Interstate; US; State; Supplemental
← Route 120	→ Route 122

Route 121 is a short highway in northwestern Missouri. It begins at U.S. Route 69 (US 69) south of Cameron, where it begins travelling eastward. The road intersects a county route and crosses over two streams. The route ends at the Wallace State Park entrance, where the road becomes Route HH after the intersection. The route was opened around 1936, serving as the connector between US 69 and the state park. The road cost $18,000 to build in 1935, and it allowed federal construction to begin at the park.

== Route description ==
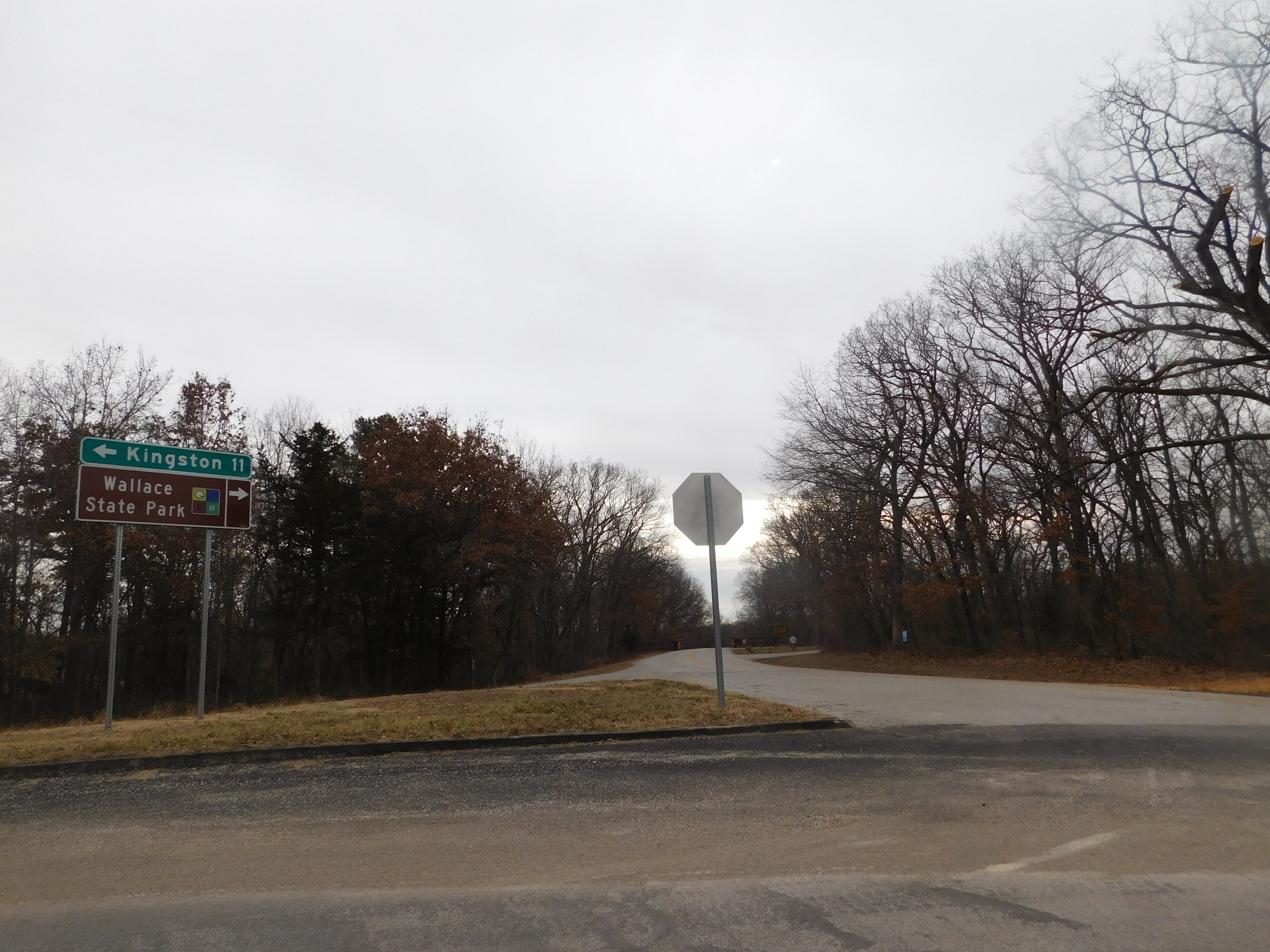
Route 121 at Route HH

All of the route is located in Clinton County. Route 121 begins at a T-intersection at US 69, south of Cameron and US 69's interchange with Interstate 35 near the city. The route travels eastwards over Christman Brook, and it enters a mixture of farmland and forests. The road intersects Northeast Jones Road, which is concurrent with the route for 0.251 miles (0.404 km). Route 121 shifts north temporarily, and it intersects Northeast Jones Road, the end of the concurrency. The road then borders Wallace State Park and crosses over Deer Creek. Travelling through a forest, the route turns southeastward near the park entrance. Route 121 ends at a Y-intersection with the park entrance and Route HH, a supplemental route. The road continues eastward as Route HH, which ends at Route 13 in Kingston.

Route 121 is designated as a major collector route by the Missouri Department of Transportation (MoDot). In 2016, MoDOT calculated 627 vehicles, including 32 trucks travelling on Route 121 east of US 69. This is expressed in terms of annual average daily traffic (AADT), a measure of traffic volume for any average day of the year. Although the route travels in an east–west fashion, MoDot has designated it as a north–south route.

== History ==
In October 1935, the Missouri State Highway Commission announced a project to construct Route 121AP from US 69 to Wallace State Park. The project included grading of the route, culverts, bridges, and gravel pavement. The projected route was 1.619 miles (2.606 km) long. Gerard Knutson of Kansas City received the contract for the project, with the lowest bid of $20,614 (equivalent to $484,079 in 2025). Approval of the project was given by Franklin D. Roosevelt by October 31, with a new price of $18,000 (equivalent to $422,694 in 2025). Construction started on November 25, by the Joe Pohl Construction Company. Workers were employed one week before construction, allocated to building the bridge near the park. The project allowed federal work to start for the park, and the finished road was reflected in the 1936 state map as Route 121. The route was paved in asphalt by 1949.

== Major intersections ==
The entire route is in Clinton County.

Location	mi	km	Destinations	Notes
	0.000	0.000	US 69	Southern terminus
Wallace State Park	1.258	2.025	Route HH	Northern terminus at entrance to Wallace State Park; Western terminus of Route HH
1.000 mi = 1.609 km; 1.000 km = 0.621 mi
