= Welch Township =

Welch Township may refer to the following townships in the United States:

- Welch Township, Goodhue County, Minnesota
- Welch Township, Cape Girardeau County, Missouri
