= Missouri Route 105 =

State highway in Missouri, U.S.

Route 105
- MO 105 highlighted in red

Route information
- Maintained by MoDOT
- Length: 10.534 mi (16.953 km)
- Existed: 1930–present

Major junctions
- South end: Route 80 in East Prairie
- I-57 / I-57 BL / US 60 in Charleston
- North end: I-57 BL / US 62 / Route 77 / Route N in Charleston

Location
- Country: United States
- State: Missouri

Highway system
- Missouri State Highway System; Interstate; US; State; Supplemental
← Route 104	→ Route 106

Route 105 is a highway in Mississippi County, Missouri. Its northern terminus is at Interstate 57/U.S. Route 60 in Charleston; its southern terminus is at Route 80 in East Prairie. Other than the two termini, no other towns are on the route.

== History ==
In 1924, Route 55 was designated along a concrete road starting from Benton to Wolf Island. A spur of Route 55, Route 55A, was designated one year later to a concrete road. Its western terminus was at the New Madrid–Mississippi county line, and its eastern terminus was at Route 55 north of East Prairie.

== Major intersections ==
The entire route is in Mississippi County.

Location	mi	km	Destinations	Notes
East Prairie	0.000	0.000	Route 80 (Washington Avenue)	
	2.315	3.726	Route 102	
	3.951	6.359	Route 75 – Anniston	
	5.427	8.734	Route C / Route D	
Charleston	9.419– 9.524	15.158– 15.327	I-57 / I-57 BL / US 60 – Sikeston, Cairo, IL	Southern end of I-57 Business concurrency
Charleston	10.534	16.953	I-57 BL / US 62 / Route 77 (Marshall Street) / Route N (Main Street)	Northern end of I-57 Business concurrency
1.000 mi = 1.609 km; 1.000 km = 0.621 mi

== See also ==
- List of state highways in Missouri
