= Three States =

Three States may refer to:

- Three States, Arkansas, Louisiana, and Texas, an unincorporated community located at the tripoint of these states
- Three States, Missouri, a ghost town
