= Hoecake Village Archeological Site =

- U.S. National Register of Historic Places
- Nearest city: East Prairie, Missouri
- Area: 275 acres (111 ha)
- NRHP reference No.: 72000723
- Added to NRHP: January 13, 1972

Hoecake Village Archeological Site (23MI8) is a historic archeological site located near East Prairie, Mississippi County, Missouri, United States. This site was investigated by archaeologists from the University of Missouri during 1963 and 1967. Almost all of the mounds were leveled before the 1960s. The site includes two surviving burial mounds, which were excavated in 1988. It was added to the National Register of Historic Places in 1972.
