= Thuroy, Missouri =

Unincorporated community in Missouri, U.S.

Coordinates: 36°30′18″N 92°12′11″W

Thuroy is an unincorporated community in Ozark County, Missouri, United States. The village was located on a northward-flowing tributary to Barren Creek, approximately one-half mile from the Missouri-Arkansas border and Missouri State Highway 101. Bakersfield is about four miles to the northeast. Barren Creek flows into Norfork Lake in Arkansas, approximately four miles to the southwest.

== History ==
A post office called Thuroy was established in 1927, and remained in operation until 1936. The community derives its name from Thursey Marshal, an early settler (a postal error accounts for the error in spelling, which was never corrected).
