= Missouri Route 4 =

Former state highway in Missouri, United States

Route 4

Route information
- Maintained by MoDOT
- Length: 76 mi (122 km)
- Existed: 1922–1960

Major junctions
- West end: N-3 at the Nebraska state line
- East end: US 136 / US 169 in Stanberry

Location
- Country: United States
- State: Missouri

Highway system
- Missouri State Highway System; Interstate; US; State; Supplemental
← Route 3	→ Route 5

Route 4 was a former state highway route in northern Missouri. For most of its history, it traveled west from the Missouri River east across the northern plains to Alexandria at the Des Moines River. The eastern two-thirds of the highway traveled from Stanberry to Alexandria, but this section was largely redesignated as US 136 in the early 1950s. There were two main routings of the western third of the highway. At first, its western terminus was in St. Joseph and then it began further southwest in Winthrop. Then, for its last three decades, it was entirely rerouted to begin near Phelps City across from Brownville. This rerouted western third was the last extant portion of the highway, which traveled from Nebraska Highway 3 at the Nebraska state line to US 169 in Stanberry; it lasted until 1960 when US 136 subsumed it.

== History ==
From 1919 until 1922, Route 4 was preceded by Road No. 4 from St. Joseph to Bethany., whereafter becoming a state highway in 1922, its eastern terminus became Alexandria. As of 1926, the western terminus of Route 4 changed to the Missouri River on the Kansas–Missouri border near Winthrop.

As of 1933, the whole western third of the highway was rerouted from Stanberry west; its new western terminus became Phelps City near the Nebraska–Missouri state line. Route 4 replaced Route 18 from Stanberry to Tarkio, became concurrent with US 275 from Tarkio to Rock Port at the same time US 275 replaced Route 1, and Route 102 from Rock Port to Phelps City. A ferry just west of Phelps City along local roads was present to cross the Missouri River to Nebraska Highway 3 in Brownville. The former routing from St. Joseph to Stanberry, which was concurrent with US 169 since 1931, became solely US 169; and southwest of St. Joseph it was re-designated as Route 45 to just southwest of Rushville and Route 18 near Winthrop.

From 1934 until 1938, Route P was designated as the state highway from the western terminus of Route 4 to the Missouri River. Then in 1939, it was then re-designated as part of Route 4. Later that year, the ferry was replaced with the Brownville Bridge, which began as a toll bridge.

As of 1953, three-fourths of Route 4 was replaced by US 136 from Stanberry to Wayland, and from Wayland to Alexandria by Route 26. By 1960, the remaining portion of Route 4 from Stanberry west to the Nebraska state line was replaced by US 136. By 1971, US 136 was re-routed to replace Route 21, and its path through the state of Missouri has not changed since.

=== Branches ===
There were two branches of Route 4 in Missouri, 4A and 4B.

Route 4A from Albany south to Evona, existed from around 1924 until 1930. It was preceded by Road No. 4A and succeeded by Route 85.

Route 4B from the Kahoka north to the Iowa–Missouri state line, existed from around 1925 to 1930. It was preceded first by Road No. 4. then Route 9, and succeeded by Route 81.

== Major intersections c. 1953-1960 ==
County	Location	mi	km	Destinations	Notes
Missouri River		0	0.0	N-3 west – Auburn	Continuation into Nebraska
Missouri River		0	0.0	Brownville Bridge; Nebraska–Missouri state line	
Atchison	Rock Port	7	11	US 275 north – Hamburg	Western end of US 275 overlap
Atchison	Rock Port	8	13	Route 111 south – Corning	
Atchison		14	23	US 59 south – Fairfax	Western end of US 59 overlap
Atchison	Tarkio	16	26	US 59 north	Eastern end of US 59 overlap
Nodaway		33	53	Route 113 south – Quitman	
Nodaway		35	56	US 71 north – Clearmont	Western end of US 71 overlap
Nodaway		46	74	Route 27 north – Hopkins	
Nodaway	Maryville	49	79	US 71 south / Route 46 west – Fairfax, St. Joseph, Kansas City	Eastern end of US 71 overlap; western end of Route 46 overlap
Nodaway		60	97	Route 46 east – Ravenwood	Eastern end Route 46 overlap
Gentry	Stanberry	76	122	US 136 / US 169 – King City, Albany	
1.000 mi = 1.609 km; 1.000 km = 0.621 mi

== See also ==
- List of state highways in Missouri
