= Big Oak Tree State Park =

State park in Missouri, United States

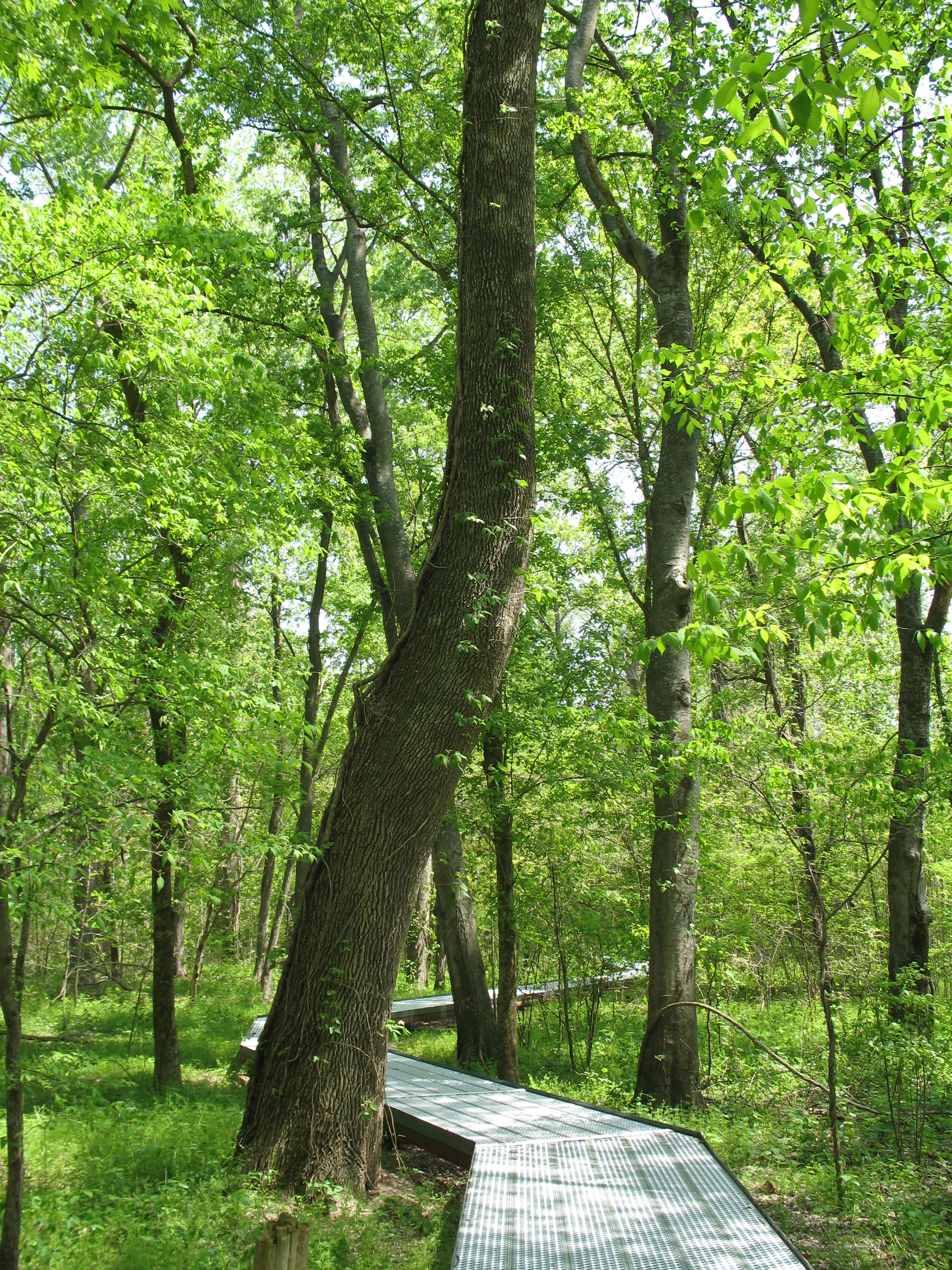
- Boardwalk trail through Big Oak Tree State Park

- Location within Missouri Location within the United States
- Location: Mississippi County, Missouri, United States
- Coordinates: 36°38′25″N 89°17′34″W
- Area: 1,028.68 acres (416.29 ha)
- Elevation: 292 ft (89 m)
- Established: 1938
- Administrator: Missouri Department of Natural Resources
- Visitors: 24,162 (in 2022)
- Website: Official website

U.S. National Natural Landmark
- Designated: May 1986

Big Oak Tree State Park is a state-owned nature preserve with recreational features encompassing 1,029 acres (416 ha) in East Prairie, Missouri, United States. The state park was established in a large expanse of drained cropland in 1938 to protect some of the largest trees in the state and in the nation. The park was declared a National Natural Landmark in May 1986, recognized as a rare, untouched wet-mesic bottomland hardwood forest in the Mississippi Alluvial Plain portion of the Gulf Coastal Plain.

== List of champion trees ==
Big Oak Tree State Park is the home of many current and past state and national champion trees—trees that are, for their species, the largest in the state or in the nation.

Champion Trees	Circumference	Height	Spread	Points	Status
Pumpkin ash	118"	150'	77'	357	Alive
Rusty blackhaw	48"	29'	25'	83	Alive
Eastern cottonwood	288"	114'	76'	421	Died 1976
Slippery elm	264"	115'	60'	394	Died 1979
Shumard oak	205"	134'	86'	361	Died 1997
Bur oak	229"	154'	92'	406	Alive
Swamp chestnut oak	272"	156'	104'	454	Alive
Pawpaw	24"	39'	26'	70	Died 1980
Persimmon	97"	133'	45'	241	Alive
Possumhaw	14"	21'	30'	42	Alive
Swamp privet	26"	28'	31'	62	Died 1959
Black willow	148"	113'	69'	278	Alive

== Activities and amenities ==
The park has two trails for hiking through the forest, including an accessible boardwalk trail, plus an interpretive center along the boardwalk and picnicking facilities.
