= Missouri Route 78 =

State highway in Missouri, U.S.

Route 78

Route information
- Maintained by MoDOT
- Length: 12.129 mi (19.520 km)

Major junctions
- West end: Blue River crossing in Kansas City
- I-435 / US 24 in Kansas City; Route 291 in Independence
- East end: Route 7 in Independence

Location
- Country: United States
- State: Missouri
- County: Jackson

Highway system
- Missouri State Highway System; Interstate; US; State; Supplemental
← Route 77	→ Route 79

Route 78 is a highway in the Kansas City, Missouri area. Its eastern terminus is at Route 7 east of Independence; its western terminus is at Interstate 435 in Kansas City. Independence and Kansas City are the only two cities on the route. The highway is known as 22nd Street or 23rd Street. and Lake City Buckner Road.

== Major intersections ==
The entire route is in Jackson County.

Location	mi	km	Destinations	Notes
Kansas City	0.000	0.000	23rd Street west	Roadway continues as 23rd Street
Kansas City	0.000	0.000	Begin state maintenance at Blue River	
Kansas City	0.395	0.636	I-435 / US 24	
Independence	6.410	10.316	Route 291	
Independence	12.129	19.520	Route 7 to US 24 – Blue Springs	Roundabout
1.000 mi = 1.609 km; 1.000 km = 0.621 mi
