= Missouri Route 79 =

State highway in Missouri, U.S.

Route 79

Route information
- Maintained by MoDOT
- Length: 86 mi (138 km)
- Tourist routes: Little Dixie Highway of the Great River Road

Major junctions
- South end: I-70 in O'Fallon
- US 54 in Louisiana
- North end: I-72 / US 36 / Route 110 (CKC) in Hannibal

Location
- Country: United States
- State: Missouri

Highway system
- Missouri State Highway System; Interstate; US; State; Supplemental
← Route 78	→ Route 80

Route 79 is a highway in eastern Missouri. Its northern terminus is at Interstate 72/U.S. Route 36 in downtown Hannibal; its southern terminus is at Interstate 70 in O'Fallon. The route closely parallels the Mississippi River.

== History ==
When Route 79 was created in about 1930, it replaced the north–south section of Route 56, which had been created in 1922 between Troy and O'Fallon. The part of Route 56 west of Winfield became an extension of Route 47.

Route 79 had major closures as a result of the Mississippi River floods of 2019 and other recent floods. Its buckling pavement in summer 2019 was attributed to hotter and more erratic climate conditions.

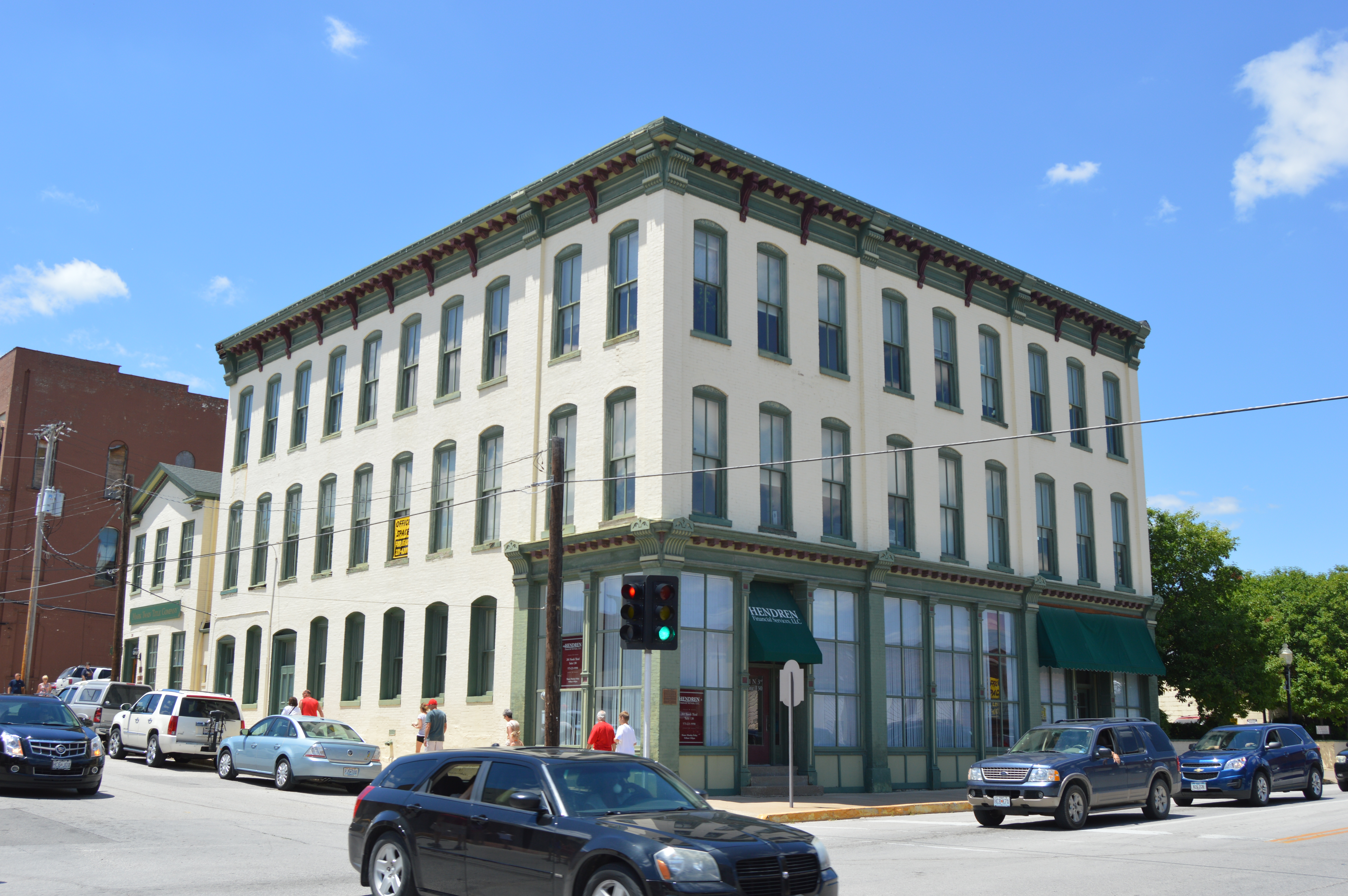
Along the route in downtown Hannibal

== Major intersections ==
All exits are unnumbered.

County	Location	mi	km	Destinations	Notes
St. Charles	O'Fallon–St. Peters line	0.000	0.000	I-70 / Great River Road – St. Louis, Columbia	Southern end of Great River Road overlap
St. Charles	O'Fallon–St. Peters line	0.408	0.657	Outer Road north	Interchange
St. Charles	O'Fallon–St. Peters line	1.125	1.811	Pearl Drive, Salt River Road	Interchange
Lincoln	Old Monroe	11.393	18.335	Route C – Old Monroe, Moscow Mills	Interchange
Lincoln	Winfield	15.492	24.932	Route 47 south – Troy	
Pike	Louisiana	54.567	87.817	US 54 east – Pittsfield	Eastern end of US 54 overlap
Pike	Louisiana	54.817	88.219	US 54 west – Bowling Green	Western end of US 54 overlap
Ralls	No major junctions				
Marion	Hannibal	87.952	141.545	I-72 / US 36 / Route 110 (CKC) / Great River Road – Monroe City, Springfield IL	Northern end of Great River Road overlap
1.000 mi = 1.609 km; 1.000 km = 0.621 mi: Concurrency terminus
