= Dorena, Missouri =

Unincorporated community in Missouri, United States

Coordinates: 36°36′58″N 89°14′14″W

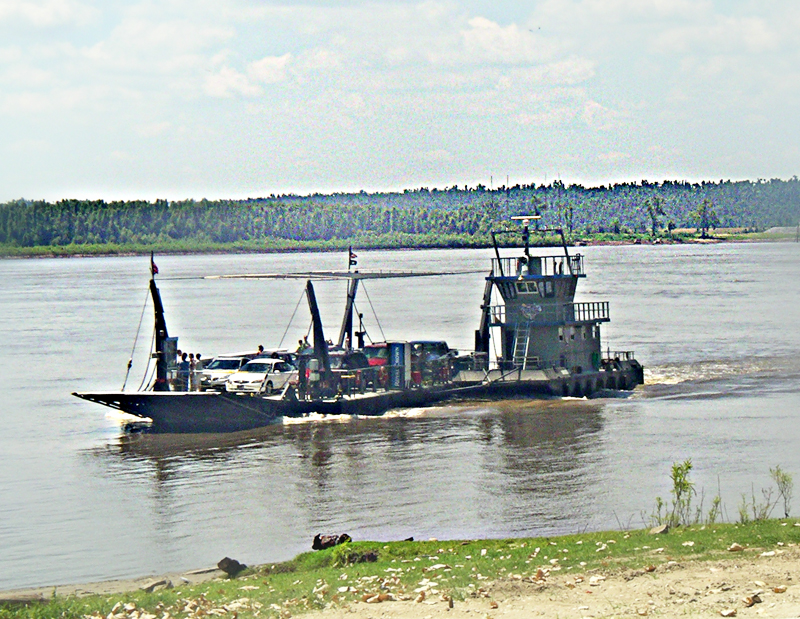

Dorena is an unincorporated community in southeastern Mississippi County, Missouri, United States. Route 77 and Route 102 intersect here, approximately 13 miles southeast of East Prairie. Dorena lends its name to the nearby Dorena-Hickman Ferry, which connects Route 77 with the Kentucky side of the Mississippi River.

A post office called Dorena was established in 1899, and closed in 1973. The name is believed to be derived from an old slang term for money.
