= Missouri Route 77 =

State highway in Missouri, U.S.

Route 77

Route information
- Maintained by MoDOT
- Length: 65 mi (105 km)

Major junctions
- South end: KY 1354 via Mississippi River ferry
- I-57 / I-57 BL / US 60 / US 62 at Charleston; I-55 at Benton; US 61 from Benton to Morley
- North end: Route 25 / Route AB south of Dutchtown

Location
- Country: United States
- State: Missouri

Highway system
- Missouri State Highway System; Interstate; US; State; Supplemental
← Route 76	→ Route 78

Route 77 is a highway in southeastern Missouri. Its northern terminus is at Route 25 about four miles (6 km) south of Dutchtown; its southern terminus is at the Mississippi River in southeastern Mississippi County. The Dorena–Hickman Ferry connects the road with Kentucky Route 1354 in Kentucky.

Route 77 was previously Route 55, renumbered to avoid duplication with Interstate 55. This route was created in 1922 from Wolf Island to Benton, and was extended to Dutchtown in the early 1930s.

== Major intersections ==
County	Location	mi	km	Destinations	Notes
Mississippi River		0.000	0.000	KY 1354 east – Hickman	Continuation into Kentucky
Mississippi River		0.000	0.000	Dorena–Hickman Ferry (tolled); Kentucky–Missouri state line	
Mississippi	James Bayou Township	3.065	4.933	Route 102 west	
Mississippi	Wolf Island	12.251	19.716	Route 77 Spur to Levee Road (CR 510)	
Mississippi	Mississippi Township	15.022	24.176	Route 80 to I-55	
Mississippi	Wilson City	25.574	41.157	US 60 east / US 62 east – Cairo IL	Eastern end of US 60 and US 62 overlaps
Mississippi	Charleston	30.768	49.516	I-57 / US 60 west – Cairo IL, Sikeston I-57 BL begins	Western end of US 60 overlap; eastern end of Loop 57 overlap
Mississippi	Charleston	32.502	52.307	I-57 BL south / Route 105 south / Route N (Main Street)	Western end of Loop 57 overlap
Mississippi	Long Prairie Township	36.626	58.944	US 62 west – Bertrand	Western end of US 62 overlap
Scott	Moreland Township	51.187	82.377	I-55 – Sikeston, Cape Girardeau	
Scott	Lambert	52.827	85.017	US 61 north – Kelso	Northern end of US 61 overlap
Scott	Morley	57.386	92.354	US 61 south – Sikeston	Southern end of US 61 overlap
Cape Girardeau	Welch Township	70.761	113.879	Route 25 / Route AB to I-55 – Dutchtown, Delta	Roundabout
1.000 mi = 1.609 km; 1.000 km = 0.621 mi: Concurrency terminus; Tolled

== See also ==
- Lindbergh Boulevard
