= Arkansas Highway 101 =

Highway in Arkansas

Highway 101

Route information
- Maintained by ArDOT
- Existed: 1926–present

Section 1
- Length: 11.17 mi (17.98 km)
- South end: US 62 / US 412 at Henderson
- North end: Route 101 at the Missouri state line near Gamaliel

Section 2
- Length: 7.13 mi (11.47 km)
- South end: CR 664 at Hand Valley
- North end: US 62 / US 412 near Flippin

Location
- Country: United States
- State: Arkansas
- Counties: Baxter, Marion

Highway system
- Arkansas Highway System; Interstate; US; State; Business; Spurs; Suffixed; Scenic; Heritage
← AR 100	→ AR 102

Arkansas Highway 101 (AR 101) is a designation for two state highways in north central Arkansas. One segment of 11.17 miles (17.98 km) runs from US 62/US 412 north to the Missouri state line. A second segment of 7.13 miles (11.47 km) runs from Marion CR 664 at Hand Valley north to US 62/US 412.

== Route description ==
=== Norfork Lake to Missouri ===
Highway 101 begins at an overlap between US 62/US 412 east of Mountain Home near Lake Norfork. The route passes the Panther Bay Public Use Area, the Bidwell Point Use Area, and the Seward Point Public Use Area. Highway continues north through the community of Gamaliel before crossing into Missouri where the roadway continues as Route 101. The average daily traffic counts from the Arkansas State Highway and Transportation Department (AHTD) for 2010 show that a maximum of about 2800 vehicles per day (VPD) use the northern portion of Highway 101, with the count dropping to around 1500 VPD for portions further south.

=== Hand Valley to US 62 ===
Highway 101 begins at Marion County Route 664 at the unincorporated community of Hand Valley and runs north to Rea Valley. The route continues north to terminate at US 62/US 412 between Cotter and Flippin. Traffic counts from the AHTD in 2010 indicate that the average daily traffic volume on this segment of Highway 101 is about 1100 vehicles per day.

== History ==
Arkansas Highway 101 was one of the original 1926 state highways.

Highway 101 is one of the original 1926 state highways, running only from State Road 12 north through Gamaliel to Missouri. The portion from Hand Valley to US 62/US 412 was added before 1929 and ran along its current routing. Highway 12 was later replaced by US 62 and US 412 was added still later.

== Major intersections ==
=== Section 1 ===
The entire route is in Baxter County.

Location	mi	km	Destinations	Notes
	0.00	0.00	US 62 / US 412 – Mountain Home, Salem	Southern terminus
Norfork Lake	1.49– 2.03	2.40– 3.27	Bridge over Norfork Lake	
	11.17	17.98	Route 101 north	Continuation into Missouri
1.000 mi = 1.609 km; 1.000 km = 0.621 mi

=== Section 2 ===
The entire route is in Marion County.

Location	mi	km	Destinations	Notes
Hand Valley	0.00	0.00	CR 664	Southern terminus
	7.13	11.47	US 62 / US 412 – Harrison, Mountain Home	Northern terminus
1.000 mi = 1.609 km; 1.000 km = 0.621 mi
