= Wolf Island, Missouri =

Unincorporated community in Missouri, United States

Coordinates: 36°44′21″N 89°12′37″W

Wolf Island is an unincorporated community in eastern Mississippi County, Missouri, United States. It is located on Route 77, approximately nine miles east of East Prairie.

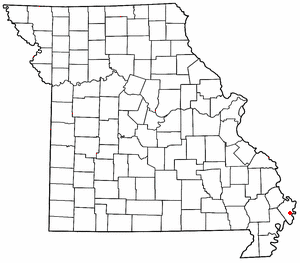

According to the United States Geological Survey, Wolf Island is the easternmost named place in Missouri.

== History ==
The community was founded in 1792 and is named for Wolf Island in the Mississippi River, which is actually part of Kentucky. According to Missouri folklorist Margot Ford McMillen, the name of both the island and the community stem from the large number of wolves that were present in the area in the late 18th and early 19th centuries. The wolves have long since disappeared from the state, but the place names remain. Wolf Island was once a hideout for criminals. After they left their headquarters at Cave-In-Rock in 1799, Samuel Mason and his gang of river pirates relocated to the Kentucky island.
