= Gamaliel, Arkansas =

- Census-designated place
- Location within Arkansas Location within the United States
- Coordinates: 36°27′07″N 92°14′13″W
- Country: United States
- State: Arkansas
- County: Baxter
- Elevation: 869 ft (265 m)

Population (2020)
  - Total: 33
- Time zone: UTC-6 (Central (CST))
  - Summer (DST): UTC-5 (CDT)
- ZIP code: 72537
- Area code: 870
- GNIS feature ID: 2805646

Gamaliel /ɡəˈmeɪl.iːə/ gə-MAIL-ee-ə is an unincorporated community and census-designated place (CDP) in Baxter County, Arkansas, United States. Gamaliel is located along Arkansas Highway 101, 12 miles (19 km) northeast of Mountain Home and 3 mi (4.8 km) south of the Arkansas—Missouri border. Gamaliel has a post office with ZIP code 72537.

Gamaliel is located on a ridge between Bennetts Bayou to the east and the Norfork River/Norfork Lake to the west. Gamaliel campground on the east arm of Norfork Lake is about three miles to the southeast.

It was first listed as a CDP in the 2020 census with a population of 33.

== Demographics ==
Historical population
Census	Pop.	Note	%±
2020	33		—
U.S. Decennial Census; 2020

=== 2020 census ===
Gamaliel CDP, Arkansas – racial and ethnic composition Note: the US Census treats Hispanic/Latino as an ethnic category. This table excludes Latinos from the racial categories and assigns them to a separate category. Hispanics/Latinos may be of any race.
Race / ethnicity (NH = Non-Hispanic)	Pop 2020	% 2020
White alone (NH)	31	93.94%
Black or African American alone (NH)	2	6.06%
Native American or Alaska Native alone (NH)	0	0.00%
Asian alone (NH)	0	0.00%
Pacific Islander alone (NH)	0	0.00%
Some other race alone (NH)	0	0.00%
Mixed-race or multi-racial (NH)	0	0.00%
Hispanic or Latino (any race)	0	0.00%
Total	33	100.00%
