= Big Spring Historic District =

Historic district in Missouri, United States

- U.S. National Register of Historic Places
- U.S. Historic district
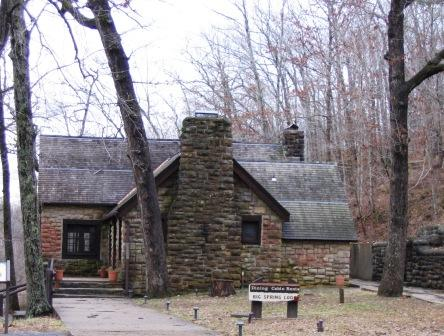
- Big Spring Lodge, March 2006

- Location within Missouri Location within the United States
- Location: E of Van Buren on MO 103, near Van Buren, Missouri
- Coordinates: 36°56′55″N 90°59′35″W
- Area: 315 acres (127 ha)
- Built: 1925-1927, 1933-1937
- Architect: Civilian Conservation Corps
- NRHP reference No.: 81000101
- Added to NRHP: March 17, 1981

Big Spring Historic District is a national historic district located at Van Buren, Carter County, Missouri. It encompasses 26 contributing buildings, 1 contributing site, and contributing structure in the Ozark National Scenic Riverways. It includes the Big Spring, rental cabins, service building, storage shed, garage, a museum, dining lodge, restroom, shelter house, ranger station, pump house, footbridge, and two picnic shelters. The structures represent the best features of park construction by the Civilian Conservation Corps in Missouri.

It was listed on the National Register of Historic Places in 1981.
