= Welch Township, Cape Girardeau County, Missouri =

Inactive township in the US state of Missouri

Welch Township
- Township
- Coordinates: 37°11′08″N 089°44′51″W
- Country: United States
- State: Missouri
- County: Cape Girardeau

Area
  - Total: 59.55 sq mi (154.23 km^{2})
  - Land: 59.41 sq mi (153.86 km^{2})
  - Water: 0.14 sq mi (0.36 km^{2}) 0.23%
- Elevation: 335 ft (102 m)

Population (2000)
  - Total: 1,344
  - Density: 23/sq mi (8.7/km^{2})
- FIPS code: 29-78280
- GNIS feature ID: 0766403

Welch Township is one of ten townships in Cape Girardeau County, Missouri, USA. As of the 2000 census, its population was 1,344.

== History ==
Welch Township was founded in 1856. The township was named for M. Welch, a local judge.

== Geography ==
Welch Township covers an area of 59.55 square miles (154.2 km^{2}) and contains one incorporated settlement, Delta. Known cemeteries include Cox, Fairview/French, Hitt 4, Kenyon, Trinity Methodist/Little German, Wondel.

Round Pond (historical) is within this township.
