= Wallace State Park =

State park in Missouri, United States

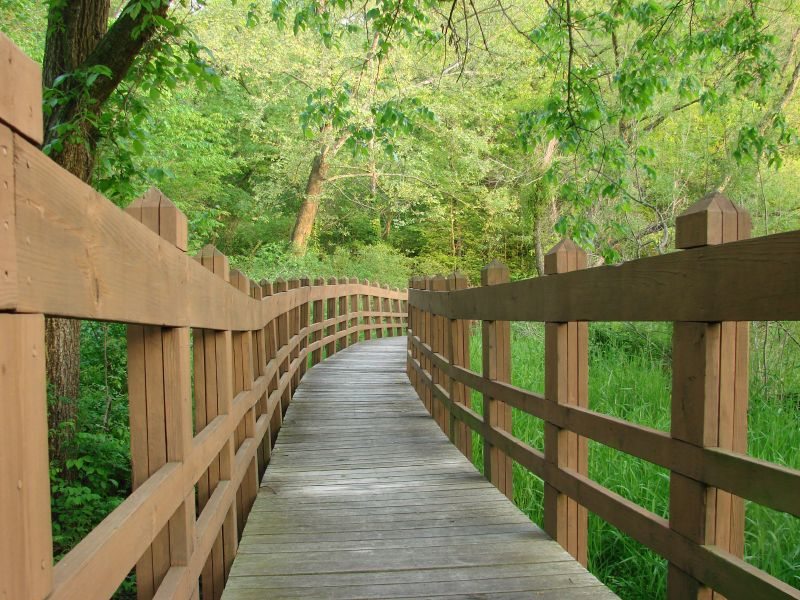
- Walking bridge in Wallace State Park, May 2008

- Location within Missouri Location within the United States
- Location: Clinton County, Missouri, United States
- Coordinates: 39°39′25″N 94°12′51″W
- Area: 573.37 acres (232.03 ha)
- Elevation: 909 ft (277 m)
- Established: 1932
- Administrator: Missouri Department of Natural Resources
- Visitors: 213,757 (in 2023)
- Website: Official website

Wallace State Park is a public recreation area located seven miles (11 km) south of Cameron in Clinton County, Missouri. The state park's 573 acres (232 ha) encompass a six-acre (2.4 ha) lake, Lake Allaman, for swimming, fishing, and boating, hiking trails, picnicking facilities, and a campground.

== History ==
The state acquired the park's first 121 acres in 1932 and named it for the family who had owned the land for more than a century. The Works Progress Administration performed much of the site's early development during the 1930s.
