= Three States, Missouri =

Extinct hamlet in Missouri, U.S.

Coordinates: 36°37′04″N 89°16′33″W

Three States is an extinct town in Mississippi County, in the U.S. state of Missouri. The GNIS classifies it as a populated place.

A post office called Three States was established in 1893, and remained in operation until 1899. The community took its name from the Three States Lumber Company. A variant name was "St. James".
