= Dorena–Hickman Ferry =

Coordinates: 36.577°N 89.216°W

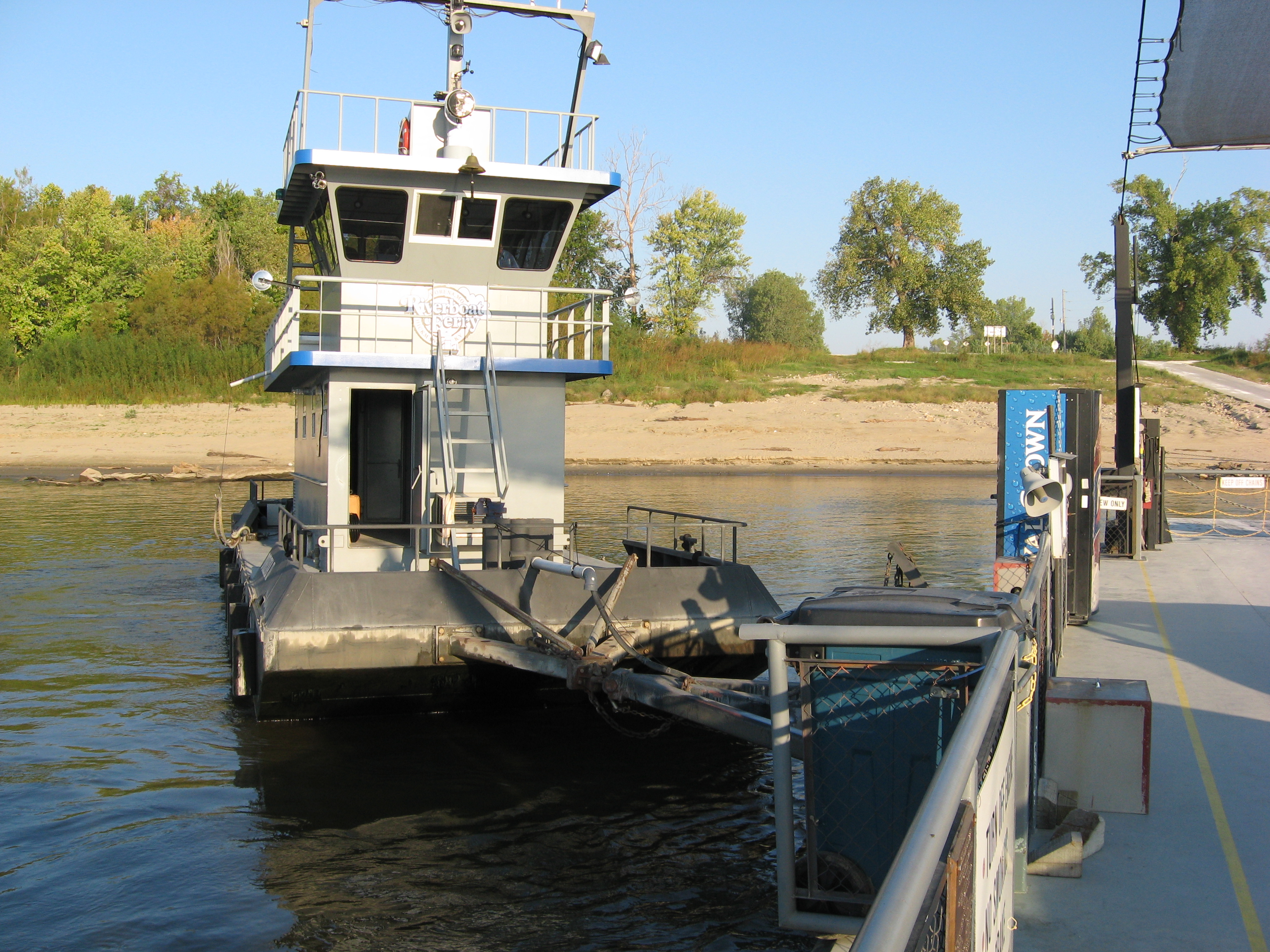
Dorena–Hickman Ferry

The Dorena–Hickman Ferry is a ferry across the Mississippi River between Dorena, Missouri and Hickman, Kentucky. A single boat takes vehicular traffic across the river seven days a week during daylight hours. Missouri Route 77 connects to the Missouri side while Kentucky Route 1354 connects to the Kentucky side.

It provides the only direct road connection between the two states' mainlands. However, they are indirectly connected at Cairo, Illinois via US 60/US 62 over the Cairo Mississippi River Bridge and the Cairo Ohio River Bridge, both just above the mouth of the Ohio River. Nonetheless, since the Ohio is the historic division between the upper and lower parts of the Mississippi, this ferry is the furthest-upstream crossing of the Lower Mississippi. The two Cairo bridges are the furthest-downstream crossings of the Upper Mississippi and the Ohio, respectively.

== See also ==
- List of crossings of the Lower Mississippi River
