= Anniston, Missouri =

- City
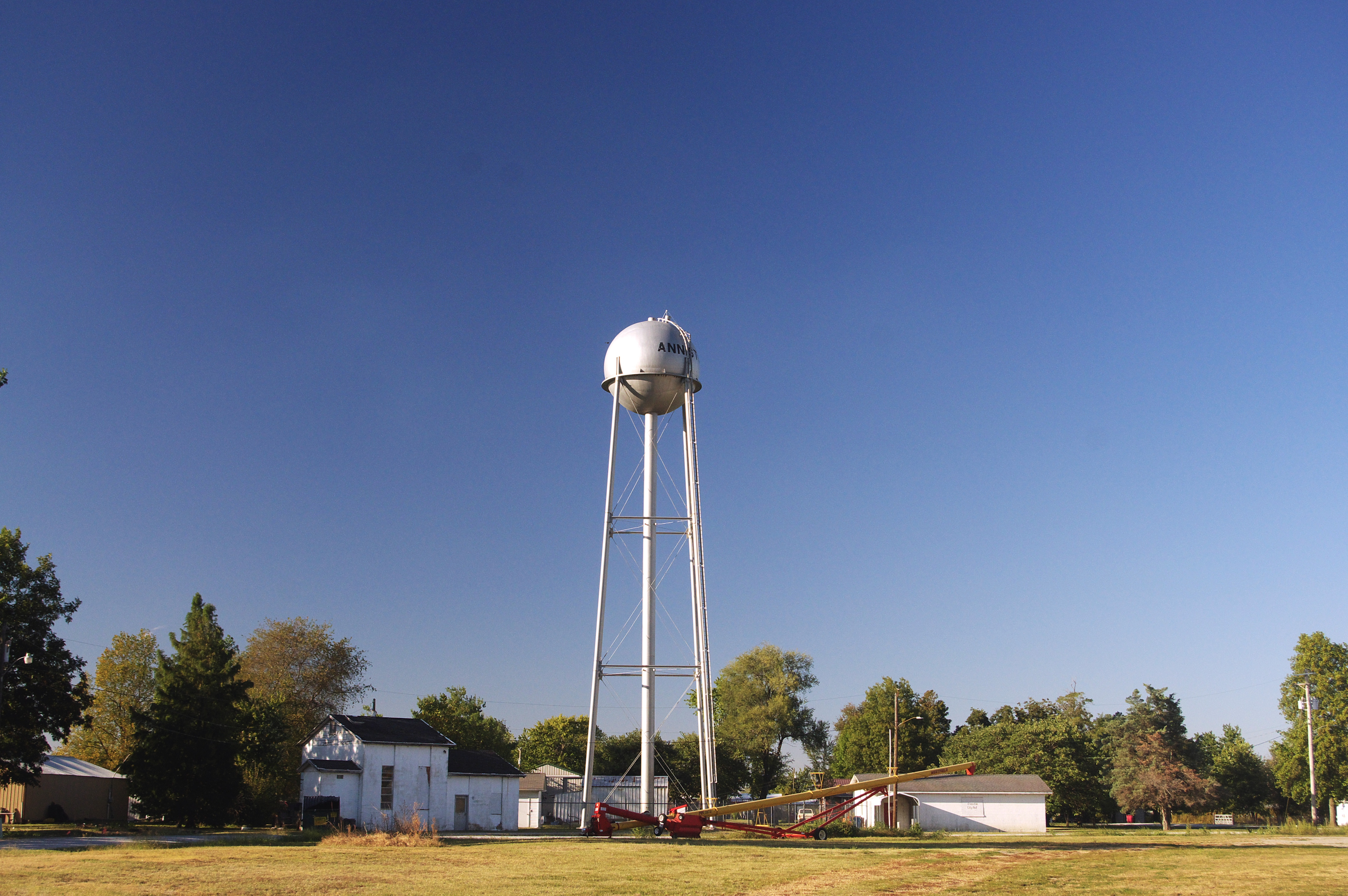
- Anniston

- Location in Mississippi County and the state of Missouri
- Coordinates: 36°49′28″N 89°19′36″W
- Country: United States
- State: Missouri
- County: Mississippi

Area
  - Total: 0.39 sq mi (1.01 km^{2})
  - Land: 0.39 sq mi (1.01 km^{2})
  - Water: 0 sq mi (0.00 km^{2})
- Elevation: 312 ft (95 m)

Population (2020)
  - Total: 180
  - Density: 459.8/sq mi (177.53/km^{2})
- Time zone: UTC-6 (Central (CST))
  - Summer (DST): UTC-5 (CDT)
- ZIP code: 63820
- Area code: 573
- FIPS code: 29-01288
- GNIS feature ID: 2397433

Anniston is a city in Mississippi County, Missouri, United States. The population was 180 at the 2020 census, down from 232 in 2010. In 2024, the city voted to disincorporate.

== History ==
Anniston was originally called "Hainley's Switch", after Jacob Hainley, the proprietor of a local mill. A post office called Hainley's Switch was established in 1890, and the name was changed to Anniston in 1894. The present name is a transfer from Anniston, Alabama.

== Geography ==
Anniston is located in central Mississippi County along Missouri Route 75, east of the highway's intersection with Missouri Route 105. Charleston is 8 miles (13 km) to the north, and East Prairie is 5 miles (8 km) to the southwest.

According to the U.S. Census Bureau, Anniston has a total area of 0.39 square miles (1.01 km^{2}), all land. The city is about 1 mile (1.6 km) west of James Bayou and 5 miles (8 km) west of the Mississippi River.

== Demographics ==
Historical population
Census	Pop.	Note	%±
1900	155		—
1910	364		134.8%
1920	365		0.3%
1930	378		3.6%
1940	379		0.3%
1950	377		−0.5%
1960	307		−18.6%
1970	515		67.8%
1980	320		−37.9%
1990	288		−10.0%
2000	285		−1.0%
2010	232		−18.6%
2020	180		−22.4%
U.S. Decennial Census

=== 2010 census ===
As of the census of 2010, there were 232 people, 94 households, and 61 families living in the city. The population density was 594.9 inhabitants per square mile (229.7/km^{2}). There were 107 dwellings with an average density of 274.4 per square mile (105.9/km^{2}). The racial makeup of the city was 97.41% White, 2.16% Black or African American, and 0.43% from two or more races.

There were 94 households, of which 30.9% had children under the age of 18 living with them, 46.8% were married couples living together, 12.8% had a female householder with no husband present, 5.3% had a male householder with no wife present, and 35.1% were non-families. 29.8% of all households were made up of individuals, and 16% had someone living alone who was 65 years of age or older. The average household size was 2.47 and the average family size was 3.10.

The median age in the city was 43.4 years. 22.4% of residents were under the age of 18; 6% were between the ages of 18 and 24; 23.7% were from 25 to 44; 25% were from 45 to 64; and 22.8% were 65 years of age or older. The gender makeup of the city was 49.1% male and 50.9% female.

=== 2000 census ===
As of the census of 2000, there were 285 people, 118 households, and 78 families living in the town. The population density was 717.9 inhabitants per square mile (277.2/km^{2}). There were 133 housing units at an average density of 335.0 per square mile (129.3/km^{2}). The racial makeup of the town was 97.54% White and 2.46% African American. Hispanic or Latino of any race were 0.35% of the population.

There were 118 households, out of which 25.4% had children under the age of 18 living with them, 55.9% were married couples living together, 7.6% had a female householder with no husband present, and 33.1% were non-families. 28.8% of all households were made up of individuals, and 13.6% had someone living alone who was 65 years of age or older. The average household size was 2.42 and the average family size was 2.96.

In the town the population was spread out, with 22.8% under the age of 18, 8.4% from 18 to 24, 27.4% from 25 to 44, 24.6% from 45 to 64, and 16.8% who were 65 years of age or older. The median age was 38 years. For every 100 females there were 103.6 males. For every 100 females age 18 and over, there were 103.7 males.

The median income for a household in the town was $22,232, and the median income for a family was $26,000. Males had a median income of $20,625 versus $17,031 for females. The per capita income for the town was $9,626. About 11.1% of families and 15.4% of the population were below the poverty line, including 22.1% of those under the age of eighteen and 12.0% of those 65 or over.

== Education ==
It is in the Charleston R-I School District.

There was previously an Anniston High School, with an addition planned around 1957.

In 1963, voters of the Charleston, Anniston, and Fox school districts passed a unified school district reorganization plan by a vote of 1,111 to 167.
