= East Prairie, Missouri =

- City
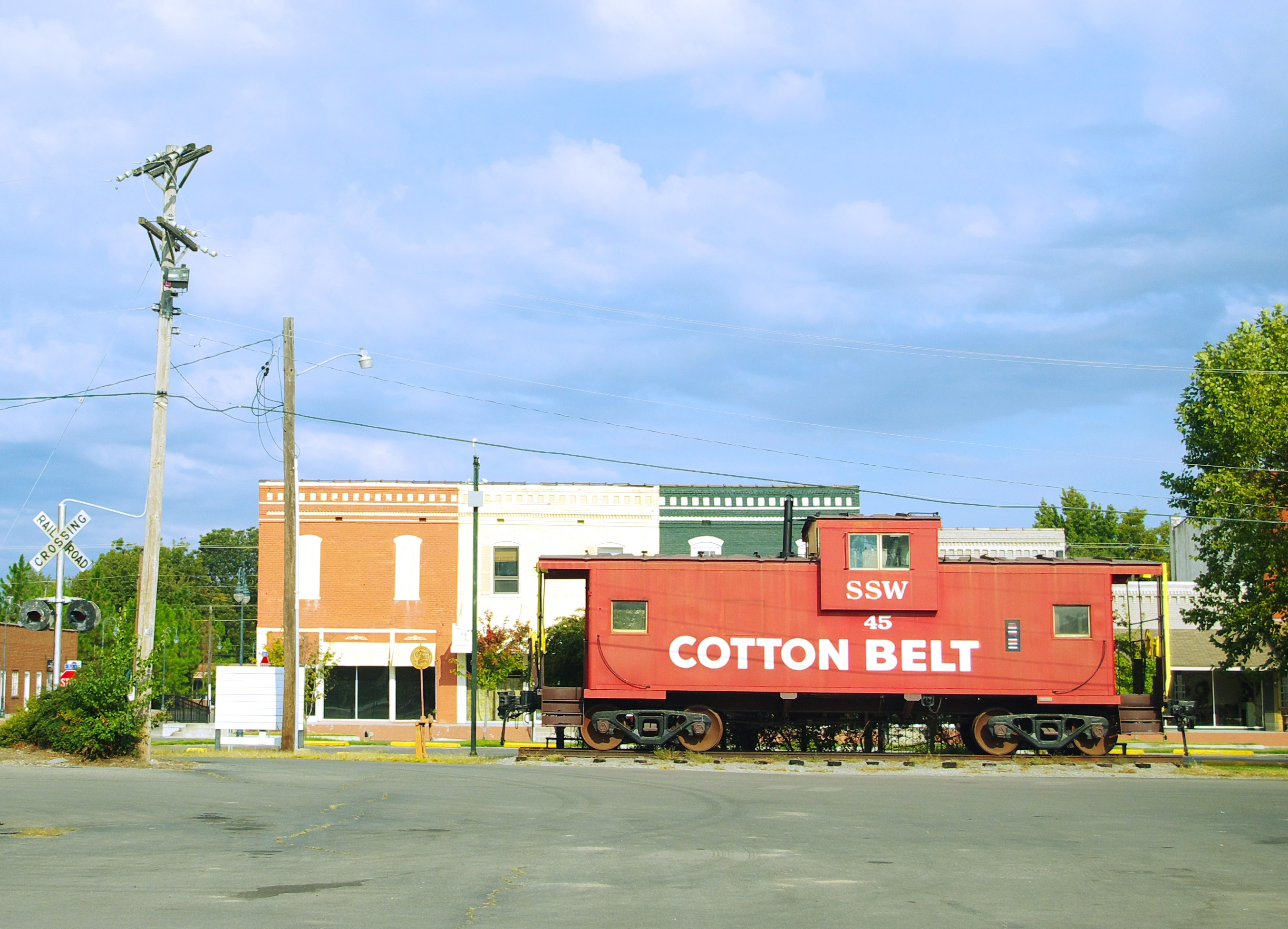
- East Prairie

- Location in Mississippi County and the state of Missouri
- Coordinates: 36°46′44″N 89°23′02″W
- Country: United States
- State: Missouri
- County: Mississippi

Area
  - Total: 1.25 sq mi (3.24 km^{2})
  - Land: 1.25 sq mi (3.24 km^{2})
  - Water: 0 sq mi (0.00 km^{2})
- Elevation: 308 ft (94 m)

Population (2020)
  - Total: 2,943
  - Density: 2,354.5/sq mi (909.07/km^{2})
- Time zone: UTC-6 (Central (CST))
  - Summer (DST): UTC-5 (CDT)
- ZIP code: 63845
- Area code: 573
- FIPS code: 29-21052
- GNIS feature ID: 2394606
- Website: www.eastprairiemo.net

East Prairie is a city in Mississippi County, Missouri, United States. The population was 2,943 at the 2020 census, down from 3,176 in 2010.

== History ==
A post office called East Prairie has been in operation since 1872. The community took its name from a prairie of the same name near the original town site. The current town, which lies about a mile south of the original post office site, was established in 1883 as a stop along the St. Louis Southwestern Railway ("Cotton Belt"), and was originally known as "Hibbard". The East Prairie postmaster, S.P. Martin, moved the post office to the new town site. By 1900, the city's name had been changed from "Hibbard" to "East Prairie".

Hess Archeological Site, Hoecake Village Archeological Site, and Mueller Archeological Site, some of which contain Native American burial mounds, are located near East Prairie and are listed on the National Register of Historic Places.

== Geography ==
As its name indicates, the city lies in the eastern portion of a lowland area that extends from the Ozark Highlands to the Mississippi River, covering much of the Bootheel. Missouri Route 80 connects East Prairie with Interstate 55 and Matthews to the west, and the rural areas near the Mississippi River to the east. Route 105, which intersects Route 80 in East Prairie, connects the city with Charleston to the north. The small city of Anniston is located just northeast of East Prairie.

According to the US Census Bureau, East Prairie has a total area of 1.25 square miles (3.24 km^{2}), all land.

== Demographics ==
Historical population
Census	Pop.	Note	%±
1890	298		—
1900	388		30.2%
1910	1,243		220.4%
1920	1,124		−9.6%
1930	1,385		23.2%
1940	2,469		78.3%
1950	3,033		22.8%
1960	3,449		13.7%
1970	3,275		−5.0%
1980	3,713		13.4%
1990	3,416		−8.0%
2000	3,227		−5.5%
2010	3,176		−1.6%
2020	2,943		−7.3%

=== 2020 census ===
As of the 2020 census, East Prairie had a population of 2,943. The median age was 38.5 years. 25.2% of residents were under the age of 18 and 17.9% of residents were 65 years of age or older. For every 100 females there were 89.1 males, and for every 100 females age 18 and over there were 85.2 males age 18 and over.

0.0% of residents lived in urban areas, while 100.0% lived in rural areas.

There were 1,202 households in East Prairie, of which 31.5% had children under the age of 18 living in them. Of all households, 36.1% were married-couple households, 18.9% were households with a male householder and no spouse or partner present, and 36.0% were households with a female householder and no spouse or partner present. About 32.2% of all households were made up of individuals and 15.5% had someone living alone who was 65 years of age or older.

There were 1,330 housing units, of which 9.6% were vacant. The homeowner vacancy rate was 3.7% and the rental vacancy rate was 6.3%.

Racial composition as of the 2020 census
Race	Number	Percent
White	2,670	90.7%
Black or African American	124	4.2%
American Indian and Alaska Native	11	0.4%
Asian	3	0.1%
Native Hawaiian and Other Pacific Islander	0	0.0%
Some other race	26	0.9%
Two or more races	109	3.7%
Hispanic or Latino (of any race)	48	1.6%

=== 2010 census ===
As of the census of 2010, there were 3,176 people, 1,294 households, and 846 families residing in the city. The population density was 2,462.0 inhabitants per square mile (950.6/km^{2}). There were 1,398 housing units at an average density of 1,083.7 per square mile (418.4/km^{2}). The racial makeup of the city was 95.69% White, 2.33% Black or African American, 0.38% Native American, 0.06% Asian, 0.38% from other races, and 1.16% from two or more races. Hispanic or Latino of any race were 1.42% of the population.

There were 1,294 households, of which 35.5% had children under the age of 18 living with them, 39.3% were married couples living together, 19.9% had a female householder with no husband present, 6.2% had a male householder with no wife present, and 34.6% were non-families. 29.7% of all households were made up of individuals, and 14.6% had someone living alone who was 65 years of age or older. The average household size was 2.42 and the average family size was 2.94.

The median age in the city was 38.5 years. 25.4% of residents were under the age of 18; 8.5% were between the ages of 18 and 24; 24.7% were from 25 to 44; 24.3% were from 45 to 64; and 17.2% were 65 years of age or older. The gender makeup of the city was 45.9% male and 54.1% female.

=== 2000 census ===
As of the census of 2000, there were 3,227 people, 1,333 households, and 906 families residing in the city. The population density was 2,526.0 inhabitants per square mile (975.3/km^{2}). There were 1,418 housing units at an average density of 1,110.0 per square mile (428.6/km^{2}). The racial makeup of the city was 95.79% White, 2.26% African American, 0.65% Native American, 0.06% Asian, 0.28% from other races, and 0.96% from two or more races. Hispanic or Latino of any race were 0.77% of the population.

There were 1,333 households, out of which 32.8% had children under the age of 18 living with them, 45.7% were married couples living together, 18.8% had a female householder with no husband present, and 32.0% were non-families. 28.9% of all households were made up of individuals, and 15.2% had someone living alone who was 65 years of age or older. The average household size was 2.41 and the average family size was 2.95.

In the city the population was spread out, with 26.9% under the age of 18, 10.1% from 18 to 24, 26.6% from 25 to 44, 22.0% from 45 to 64, and 14.5% who were 65 years of age or older. The median age was 34 years. For every 100 females there were 84.3 males. For every 100 females age 18 and over, there were 78.5 males.

The median income for a household in the city was $19,825, and the median income for a family was $24,063. Males had a median income of $23,494 versus $16,284 for females. The per capita income for the city was $10,912. About 25.6% of families and 30.1% of the population were below the poverty line, including 33.0% of those under age 18 and 32.4% of those age 65 or over.

== Education ==
The city is part of the East Prairie R-II School District. East Prairie R-II School District operates one elementary school, one middle school and East Prairie High School. The school district's mascot is an eagle. The current district superintendent is Dustin Hicks. A new high school was scheduled to open around 1957. Its planned capacity was about 400.

East Prairie R-II School District was one of five recipients of a $100,000 grant from the Harbor Freight Tools for Schools Prize for Teaching Excellence in 2023.

East Prairie has a public library, a branch of the Mississippi County Library District.

== In the media ==
Significant portions of the 1962 film The Intruder (directed by Roger Corman and starring William Shatner) were filmed in East Prairie.

== Notable people ==
- Orlin Collier, briefly pitched with the Detroit Tigers in 1931, born in East Prairie in 1907
- Dan Smoot, figure in the anti-communist movement, born in East Prairie in 1913
- Mark A. Hurt, MD, high school class of 1974, past president, American Society of Dermatopathology 2014-2015.
