= List of high schools in Missouri =

This is a list of high schools and school districts in the U.S. state of Missouri.

== Adair County ==
- Adair County R-I High School, Novinger
- Adair County R-II High School, Brashear

=== Kirksville ===
- Kirksville High School
- Life Church School

== Andrew County ==
- North Andrew County High School, Rosendale
- Savannah High School, Savannah

== Atchison County ==
- Fairfax High School, Fairfax
- Rock Port High School, Rock Port
- Tarkio High School, Tarkio

== Audrain County ==
- Community High School, Laddonia
- Van-Far High School, Vandalia

=== Mexico ===
- Mexico Senior High School
- Missouri Military Academy - nondenominational Christian (all-male)

== Barry County ==
- Cassville High School, Cassville
- Exeter High School, Exeter
- Monett High School, Monett
- Purdy High School, Purdy
- Southwest High School, Washburn
- Wheaton High School, Wheaton

== Barton County ==
- Golden City High School, Golden City
- Lamar High School, Lamar
- Liberal High School, Liberal

== Bates County ==
- Adrian High School, Adrian
- Ballard High School, Ballard
- Butler High School, Butler
- Hume High School, Hume
- Miami High School, Amoret
- Rich Hill High School, Rich Hill

== Benton County ==
- Cole Camp High School, Cole Camp
- Lincoln High School, Lincoln
- Warsaw High School, Warsaw

== Bollinger County ==
- Leopold High School, Leopold
- Meadow Heights High School, Patton
- Woodland High School, Marble Hill
- Zalma High School, Zalma

== Boone County ==
- Hallsville High School, Hallsville
- Harrisburg High School, Harrisburg
- Southern Boone High School, Ashland
- Sturgeon High School, Sturgeon

=== Centralia ===
- Centralia High School
- Sunnydale Adventist Academy - Seventh-Day Adventist (co-ed)

=== Columbia ===
==== Public schools ====
- David H. Hickman High School
- Frederick Douglass High School
- Muriel Battle High School
- Rock Bridge High School

==== Private schools ====
- Christian Fellowship School - nondenominational Christian (co-ed)
- Columbia Independent School - nonsectarian (co-ed)
- Heritage Academy
- Tolton High School - Roman Catholic (co-ed)
- University of Missouri High School - nonsectarian (co-ed)

== Buchanan County ==
- DeKalb High School, De Kalb
- Mid-Buchanan County High School, Faucett

=== St. Joseph ===
==== Public schools ====
- Benton High School
- St. Joseph Central High School
- Lafayette High School

==== Private schools ====
- Baptist Temple Schools - Baptist (co-ed)
- Bishop Le Blond High School - Roman Catholic (co-ed)
- St. Joseph Christian School- nondenominational Christian (co-ed)
- South Park Christian Academy - Pentecostal (co-ed)

== Butler County ==
- Neelyville High School, Neelyville
- Twin Rivers High School, Broseley

=== Poplar Bluff ===
- Agape Christian School - nondenominational Christian (co-ed)
- Poplar Bluff High School
- Southern Missouri Christian School - Pentecostal (co-ed)
- Westwood Baptist Academy - Baptist (co-ed)
- Zion Lutheran School - Missouri Synod Lutheran (co-ed)

== Caldwell County ==
- Braymer High School, Braymer
- Breckenridge High School, Breckenridge
- Penney High School, Hamilton
- Polo High School, Polo

== Callaway County ==
- Fulton High School, Fulton
- New Bloomfield High School, New Bloomfield
- North Callaway High School, Kingdom City
- South Callaway High School, Mokane

== Camden County ==
- Climax Springs High School, Climax Springs
- Macks Creek High School, Macks Creek
- Stoutland High School, Stoutland

=== Camdenton ===
- Camden Christian School - Baptist (co-ed)
- Camdenton High School

== Cape Girardeau County ==
- Delta High School, Delta
- Oak Ridge High School, Oak Ridge

=== Cape Girardeau ===
- Cape Central High School
- Cape Girardeau Career & Technology Center
- Eagle Ridge Christian School - nondenominational Christian (co-ed)
- Notre Dame Regional High School - Roman Catholic (co-ed)

=== Jackson ===
- Jackson High School
- Saxony Lutheran High School - Missouri Synod Lutheran (co-ed)

== Carroll County ==
- Bosworth High School, Bosworth
- Carrollton High School, Carrollton
- Hale High School, Hale
- Norborne High School, Norborne
- Tina-Avalon High School, Tina

== Carter County ==
- East Carter County High School, Ellsinore
- Van Buren High School, Van Buren

== Cass County ==
- Archie High School, Archie
- Drexel High School, Drexel
- Harrisonville High School, Harrisonville
- Midway High School, Cleveland
- Raymore–Peculiar High School/Freshman Center, Peculiar
- Sherwood High School, Creighton
- Training Center Christian School, Garden City - Pentecostal (co-ed)

=== Belton ===
- Belton High School/Freshman Center
- Heartland High School - Baptist (co-ed)

=== Pleasant Hill ===
- Hope Baptist Christian School - Baptist (co-ed)
- Pleasant Hill High School

== Cedar County ==
=== El Dorado Springs ===
- El Dorado Christian School - Church of God (co-ed)
- El Dorado Springs High School

=== Stockton ===
- Agape Baptist Academy - Baptist (all male)
- Stockton High School

== Chariton County ==
- Brunswick High School, Brunswick
- Keytesville High School, Keytesville
- Northwestern High School, Mendon
- Salisbury High School, Salisbury

== Christian County ==
- Billings High School, Billings
- Chadwick High School, Chadwick
- Clever High School, Clever
- Nixa Public High School, Nixa
- Ozark High School, Ozark
- Sparta High School, Sparta

=== Spokane ===
- Faith Christian School - Baptist (co-ed)
- Spokane High School

== Clark County ==
- Clark County High School, Kahoka

== Clay County ==
- Excelsior Springs High School, Excelsior Springs
- Kearney High School, Kearney
- Outreach Christian Education School, Avondale - nondenominational Christian (co-ed)
- Smithville High School, Smithville

=== Liberty ===
- Liberty High School
- Liberty North High School

=== Kansas City ===
- Eagle Heights Christian School - Baptist (co-ed)
- Faith Academy - non-denominational (co-ed)
- North Kansas City High School
- Kalos Christian Academy
- Northland Christian School - non-denominational (co-ed)
- Oak Park High School
- Staley High School
- Winnetonka High School
- St. Pius X High School - Roman Catholic (co-ed)

== Clinton County ==
- Cameron High School, Cameron
- Lathrop High School, Lathrop
- Plattsburg High School, Plattsburg
- East Buchanan High School, Gower

== Cole County ==
- Russellville High School, Russellville
- Eugene High School, Eugene

=== Jefferson City ===
- Blair Oaks High School
- Calvary Lutheran High School - Lutheran (co-ed)
- Capital City High School
- Central Baptist Christian Academy - Baptist (co-ed)
- Helias Catholic High School - Roman Catholic (co-ed)
- Jefferson City High School/Simonsen 9th Grade Center
- Lighthouse Preparatory Academy - nonsectarian (co-ed)

== Cooper County ==
- Boonville High School, Booneville
- Bunceton High School, Bunceton
- Otterville High School, Otterville
- Pilot Grove High School, Pilot Grove
- Prairie Home High School, Prairie Home

== Crawford County ==
- Bourbon High School, Bourbon
- Cuba High School, Cuba
- Meramec Valley Christian School, Sullivan - Baptist (co-ed)
- Steelville High School, Steelville

== Dade County ==
- Dadeville High School, Dadeville
- Everton High School, Everton
- Greenfield High School, Greenfield
- Lockwood High School, Lockwood

== Dallas County ==
- Buffalo High School, Buffalo

== Daviess County ==
- Gallatin High School, Gallatin
- North Daviess High School, Jameson
- Pattonsburg High School, Pattonsburg
- Tri-County High School, Jamesport
- Winston High School, Winston

== DeKalb County ==
- Maysville High School, Maysville
- Osborn High School, Osborn
- Stewartsville High School, Stewartsville
- Union Star High School, Union Star

== Dent County ==
- Salem High School, Salem

== Douglas County ==
=== Ava ===
- Ava High School
- Mt. Zion Bible Academy - Church of God (co-ed)

== Dunklin County ==
- Campbell High School, Campbell
- Clarkton High School, Clarkton
- Holcomb High School, Holcomb
- Malden High School, Malden
- Senath-Hornersville High School, Senath
- Southland High School, Cardwell

=== Kennett ===
- Kennett Christian Academy - Pentecostal (co-ed)
- Kennett High School

== Franklin County ==
- Crosspoint Christian School, Villa Ridge - nondenominational Christian (co-ed)
- The Fulton School at St. Albans, St. Albans - nonsectarian Montessori (co-ed)
- Pacific High School, Pacific
- New Haven High School, New Haven
- Sullivan High School, Sullivan
- Union High School, Union

=== St. Clair ===
- Cornerstone Baptist Academy - other affiliation (co-ed)
- St. Clair High School

=== Washington ===
- Four Rivers Career Center
- St. Francis Borgia Regional High School - Roman Catholic (co-ed)
- Washington High School

== Gasconade County ==
- Hermann High School, Hermann
- Owensville High School, Owensville

== Gentry County ==
- Albany High School, Albany
- King City High School, King City
- Stanberry High School, Stanberry

== Greene County ==
- Ash Grove High School, Ash Grove
- Fair Grove High School, Fair Grove
- Logan-Rogersville High School, Rogersville
- Republic High School, Republic
- Strafford High School, Strafford
- Walnut Grove High School, Walnut Grove
- Willard High School, Willard

=== Springfield ===
==== Public schools ====
- Bailey Educational Center
- Community Learning Center
- Glendale High School
- Graff Career Center
- Hillcrest High School
- Kickapoo High School
- Parkview High School
- Phelps Gifted Center
- Springfield Central High School

==== Private schools ====
- Christian Schools of Springfield - Baptist (co-ed)
- Grace Classical Academy - nondenominational Christian (co-ed)
- Greenwood Laboratory School - nonsectarian (co-ed)
- New Covenant Academy - nondenominational Christian (co-ed)
- Springfield Catholic High School - Roman Catholic (co-ed)
- Summit Preparatory School of Southwest Missouri - nonsectarian (co-ed)

== Grundy County ==
- Grundy County High School, Galt
- Trenton High School, Trenton

== Harrison County ==
- Cainsville High School, Cainsville
- Gilman City High School, Gilman City
- North Harrison County High School, Eagleville
- Ridgeway High School, Ridgeway
- South Harrison County High School, Bethany

== Henry County ==
- Calhoun High School, Calhoun
- Clinton High School, Clinton
- Windsor High School, Windsor
- Montrose High School, Montrose

== Hickory County ==
- Hermitage High School, Hermitage
- Skyline High School, Urbana
- Weaubleau High School, Weaubleau
- Wheatland High School, Wheatland

== Holt County ==
- Craig High School, Craig
- Mound City High School, Mound City
- South Holt County High School, Oregon

== Howard County ==
- Fayette High School, Fayette
- Glasgow High School, Glasgow
- New Franklin High School, New Franklin

== Howell County ==
- Willow Springs High School, Willow Springs

=== Mountain View ===
- Liberty High School
- South Central Career Center
- Trinity Christian Academy - Pentecostal (co-ed)

=== West Plains ===
- Faith Assembly Christian School - Pentecostal (co-ed)
- West Plains High School

== Iron County ==
- Arcadia Valley High School, Ironton
- Viburnum High School, Viburnum
- South Iron County High School, Annapolis

== Jackson County ==
- Grain Valley High School, Grain Valley
- Lone Jack High School, Lone Jack
- Oak Grove High School, Oak Grove

=== Blue Springs ===
- Blue Springs High School
- Blue Springs South High School
- Valley View High School
- Plaza Heights Christian Academy - nondenominational Christian (co-ed)

=== Grandview ===
- Grandview Christian School - non-denominational Christian (co-ed)
- Grandview High School

=== Independence ===
- Center Place Restoration School - Community of Christ (Restoration, co-ed)
- Fort Osage High School
- Independence Academy
- McCune School for Boys
- Truman High School
- Van Horn High School
- William Chrisman High School

=== Kansas City ===
==== Public schools ====
- Center High School
- Central High School
- East High School
- Manual Career & Technical Center
- Northeast High School
- Ruskin High School
- Southeast High School

==== Charter/magnet schools ====
- Alta Vista Charter School
- Hogan Preparatory Academy
- Lee A. Tolbert Community Academy
- Lincoln College Preparatory Academy
- Paseo Academy of Performing Arts
- University Academy

==== Private schools ====
- Archbishop O'Hara High School - Roman Catholic (co-ed)
- The Barstow School - nonsectarian (co-ed)
- Blue Ridge Christian School - non-denominational Christian (co-ed)
- Cristo Rey Kansas City High School - Roman Catholic (co-ed)
- De la Salle Education Center - nonsectarian (co-ed)
- Gillis Center School - nonsectarian (co-ed)
- Heart of America Christian Academy - Pentecostal (co-ed)
- Kansas City Academy - nonsectarian (co-ed)
- Lutheran High School of Kansas City - Lutheran (co-ed)
- Notre Dame de Sion School - Roman Catholic (co-ed)
- The Pembroke Hill School - nonsectarian (co-ed)
- Rockhurst High School - Roman Catholic (all boys)
- St. Paul's Episcopal Day School - Episcopalian (co-ed)
- St. Teresa's Academy - Roman Catholic (all girls)
- Seton Center High School - nonsectarian (co-ed)
- Universal Academy Islamic School - Muslim - (co-ed)
- Whitefield Academy - nondenominational Christian (co-ed)

=== Lee's Summit ===
- Lee's Summit High School
- Lee's Summit North High School
- Lee's Summit West High School
- St. Michael the Archangel Catholic High School - Roman Catholic (co-ed)
- Summit Christian Academy - nondenominational Christian (co-ed)

=== Raytown ===
- Raytown High School
- Raytown South High School

== Jasper County ==
- Carl Junction High School, Carl Junction
- Carthage Senior High School, Carthage
- Jasper High School, Jasper
- Sarcoxie High School, Sarcoxie
- Webb City High School, Webb City

=== Joplin ===
- College Heights Christian School - nondenominational Christian (co-ed)
- Joplin High School
- McAuley Catholic High School - Roman Catholic (co-ed)
- Thomas Jefferson Independent Day School - nonsectarian (co-ed)

== Jefferson County ==
- Crystal City High School, Crystal City
- Herculaneum High School, Herculaneum
- Grandview High School, Ware
- Northwest High School, Cedar Hill

=== Arnold ===
- Fox High School
- People's Christian Academy - Pentecostal (co-ed)

=== Crystal City ===
- St. Pius X High School - Roman Catholic (co-ed)

=== De Soto ===
- De Soto High School
- Manna Christian Academy - Southern Baptist (co-ed)

=== Festus ===
- Festus High School
- Jefferson County High School
- Twin City Christian Academy - Baptist (co-ed)

=== Hillsboro ===
- Christian Outreach School - nondenominational Christian (co-ed)
- Hillsboro High School

=== Imperial ===
- Seckman High School
- Windsor High School

== Johnson County ==
- Chilhowee High School, Chilhowee
- Holden High School, Holden
- Crest Ridge High School, Centerview
- Kingsville High School, Kingsville
- Knob Noster High School, Knob Noster
- Leeton High School, Leeton
- Warrensburg High School, Warrensburg

== Knox County ==
- Knox County High School, Edina

== Laclede County ==
- Conway High School, Conway
- Lebanon High School, Lebanon

== Lafayette County ==
- Lafayette County High School, Higginsville
- Lexington High School, Lexington
- Odessa High School, Odessa
- Santa Fe High School, Alma
- Wellington-Napoleon High School, Wellington

=== Concordia ===
- Concordia High School
- St. Paul Lutheran High School - Lutheran (co-ed)

== Lawrence County ==
- Marionville High School, Marionville
- Miller High School, Miller
- Mount Vernon High School, Mount Vernon
- Pierce City High School, Pierce City
- Verona High School, Verona

=== Aurora ===
- Aurora Christian Academy - Baptist (co-ed)
- Aurora High School
- Harvest Christian Academy - nondenominational Christian (co-ed)

== Lewis County ==
- Highland High School, Ewing

=== Canton ===
- Canton High School
- Cedar Falls School - nondenominational Christian (co-ed)

== Lincoln County ==
- Elsberry High School, Elsberry
- Silex High School, Silex

=== Troy ===
- Troy Holiness School - Methodist (co-ed)
- Troy Buchanan High School/Freshman Center

=== Winfield ===
- Calvary Christian School - Pentecostal (co-ed)
- Winfield High School

== Linn County ==
- Brookfield High School, Brookfield
- Bucklin High School, Bucklin
- Linn County High School, Purdin
- Marceline High School, Marceline
- Meadville High School, Meadville

== Livingston County ==
- Chillicothe High School, Chillicothe
- Southwest Livingston County High School, Ludlow

== Macon County ==
- Atlanta High School, Atlanta
- Bevier High School, Bevier
- La Plata High School, La Plata
- Macon High School, Macon
- Macon County High School, New Cambria

== Madison County ==
- Marquand-Zion High School, Marquand

=== Fredericktown ===
- Faith Christian Academy - Baptist (co-ed)
- Fredericktown High School

== Maries County ==
- Vienna High School, Vienna
- Belle High School, Belle

== Marion County ==
- Hannibal High School, Hannibal
- Marion County High School, Philadelphia
- Palmyra High School, Palmyra

== McDonald County ==
- McDonald County High School, Anderson

== Mercer County ==
- Mercer High School, Mercer
- Princeton High School, Princeton

== Miller County ==
- Eldon High School, Eldon
- Tuscumbia High School, Tuscumbia
- St. Elizabeth High School, St. Elizabeth
- Osage High School, Osage Beach

=== Iberia ===
- Iberia High School
- Powerhouse Christian Academy - nondenominational Christian (co-ed)

== Mississippi County ==
- Charleston High School, Charleston
- East Prairie High School, East Prairie

== Moniteau County ==
- Jamestown High School, Jamestown
- California High School, California
- Tipton High School, Tipton

== Morgan County ==
- Morgan County R-I High School, Stover
- Morgan County R-II High School, Versailles

== Monroe County ==
- Madison High School, Madison
- Monroe City High School, Monroe City
- Holy Rosary School, Monroe City

=== Paris ===
- Foundation for Life Christian School - nondenominational Christian (co-ed)
- Paris High School

== Montgomery County ==
- Montgomery County High School, Montgomery City
- Wellsville-Middletown High School, Wellsville

== New Madrid County ==
- Gideon High School, Gideon
- New Madrid County Central High School, New Madrid
- Portageville High School, Portageville
- Risco High School, Risco

== Newton County ==
- Diamond High School, Diamond
- East Newton County High School, Granby
- Racine Apostolic Christian School, Racine - Pentecostal (co-ed)
- Seneca High School, Seneca

=== Neosho ===
- Neosho Christian Schools - Church of Christ (co-ed)
- Neosho High School
- Ozark Christian Academy - Pentecostal (co-ed)
- Trinity Learning Center - Protestant (co-ed)

== Nodaway County ==
- Jefferson High School, Conception Junction
- Nodaway-Holt High School, Graham, includes students from Holt County.
- North Nodaway High School, Hopkins
- Northeast Nodaway High School, Ravenwood
- South Nodaway High School, Barnard
- West Nodaway High School, Burlington Junction

=== Maryville ===
- Maryville High School
- Missouri Academy of Science, Mathematics and Computing

== Oregon County ==
- Alton High School, Alton
- Couch High School, Myrtle
- Koshkonong High School, Koshkonong
- Thayer High School, Thayer

== Osage County ==
- Chamois High School, Chamois
- Linn High School, Linn
- Fatima High School, Westphalia

== Ozark County ==
- Bakersfield High School, Bakersfield
- Dora High School, Dora
- Gainesville High School, Gainesville
- Lutie High School, Theodosia

== Pemiscot County ==
- Caruthersville High School, Caruthersville
- Cooter High School, Cooter
- Delta High School, Deering
- Hayti High School, Hayti
- North Pemiscot County High School, Wardell
- South Pemiscot County High School, Steele

== Perry County ==
=== Perryville ===
- Perryville High School
- St. Vincent de Paul Schools - Roman Catholic (co-ed)

== Pettis County ==
- Green Ridge High School, Green Ridge
- Northwest High School, Hughesville
- Smithton High School, Smithton

=== La Monte ===
- La Monte High School
- Show-Me Christian School - nondenominational Christian (co-ed)

=== Sedalia ===
- Applewood Christian School - nondenominational Christian (co-ed)
- Sacred Heart School - Roman Catholic (co-ed)
- Smith-Cotton High School

== Phelps County ==
- Newburg High School, Newburg
- Rolla High School, Rolla

=== St. James ===
- Boys & Girls Town of Missouri School - nonsectarian (co-ed)
- St. James High School

== Pike County ==
- Bowling Green High School, Bowling Green
- Clopton High School, Clarksville
- Louisiana High School, Louisiana
- Pike County Christian School, Curryville - Baptist

== Platte County ==
- North Platte County High School, Dearborn
- Platte County High School, Platte City
- West Platte County High School, Weston

=== Kansas City ===
- Park Hill High School
- Park Hill South High School
- Staley High School

== Polk County ==
- Bolivar High School, Bolivar
- Fair Play High School, Fair Play
- Halfway High School, Halfway
- Humansville High School, Humansville
- Marion C. Early High School, Morrisville
- Pleasant Hope High School, Pleasant Hope
- Word of God Fellowship Academy, Bolivar - nondenominational Christian (co-ed)

== Pulaski County ==
- Crocker High School, Crocker
- Dixon High School, Dixon
- Laquey High School, Laquey
- Maranatha Baptist Academy, St. Robert - Baptist (co-ed)
- Richland High School, Richland
- Waynesville High School, Waynesville

== Putnam County ==
- Putnam County High School, Unionville

== Ralls County ==
- Mark Twain High School, Center

== Randolph County ==
- Higbee High School, Higbee
- Moberly High School, Moberly
- Northeast Randolph County High School, Cairo
- Westran High School, Huntsville

== Ray County ==
- Hardin-Central High School, Hardin
- Lawson High School, Lawson
- Orrick High School, Orrick
- Richmond High School, Richmond

== Reynolds County ==
- Bunker High School, Bunker
- Lesterville High School, Lesterville
- Southern Reynolds County High School, Ellington

== Ripley County ==
- Naylor High School, Naylor

=== Doniphan ===
- Current River Area Vocational School
- Doniphan High School
- West Point Christian Academy - Pentecostal (co-ed)

== St. Charles County ==
- Francis Howell Central High School - Cottleville
- Francis Howell High School - Weldon Spring Heights
- Liberty High School, Lake St. Louis

=== O'Fallon ===
- Christian High School
- Fort Zumwalt Hope High School
- Fort Zumwalt North High School
- Fort Zumwalt West High School
- Liberty Classical School - nondenominational Christian (co-ed)
- Living Word Christian Schools - nondenominational Christian (co-ed)
- St. Dominic High School - Roman Catholic (co-ed)

=== St. Charles ===
- Duchesne High School - Roman Catholic (co-ed)
- Francis Howell Union High School
- Lewis & Clark Career Center
- Orchard Farm High School
- St. Charles High School
- St. Charles West High School
- Success Campus

=== St. Peters ===
- Fort Zumwalt East High School
- Fort Zumwalt South High School
- Francis Howell North High School
- Lutheran High School of St. Charles County - Lutheran (co-ed)

=== Wentzville ===
- Emil E. Holt High School
- Timberland High School

== St. Clair County ==
- Appleton City High School, Appleton City
- Osceola High School, Osceola

== St. Francois County ==
- Bismarck High School, Bismarck
- North St. Francois County High School, Bonne Terre

=== Farmington ===
- Farmington High School
- St. Paul Lutheran School - Missouri Synod Lutheran (co-ed)

=== Park Hills ===
- Park Hills Central High School
- West St. Francois County High School

== St. Louis City ==
=== Public schools ===
- Beaumont Technical Center
- Carnahan High School of the Future
- Central Visual and Performing Arts High School
- Clyde C. Miller Career Academy
- Collegiate School of Medicine and Bioscience
- Fresh Start Academy at Sumner
- Gateway STEM High School
- Griscom Alternative School
- Innovative Concept Academy at Blewett
- McKinley Classical Leadership Academy
- Metro Academic and Classical High School
- Nottingham Community Access and Job Training School
- Roosevelt High School
- Soldan International Studies High School
- Sumner High School
- Vashon High School

=== Private Schools ===
- Bishop DuBourg High School - Catholic (co-ed)
- Cardinal Ritter College Prep High School - Catholic (co-ed)
- Crossroads College Preparatory School - non-sectarian (co-ed)
- Rosati-Kain High School - Catholic (all-female)
- St. Louis University High School - Catholic (all-male)
- St. Mary's High School - Catholic (all-male)

== St. Louis County ==
- Bayless Senior High School, Unincorporated St. Louis County
- Brentwood High School, Brentwood
- Clayton High School, Clayton
- Eureka High School, Eureka
- Hazelwood West High School, Hazelwood
- Incarnate Word Academy, Bel-Nor
- Jennings High School, Jennings
- Lafayette High School, Wildwood
- Maplewood Richmond Heights High School, Maplewood
- McCluer South-Berkeley High School, Ferguson
- Mehlville High School, Mehlville
- Oakville High School, St. Louis
- Parkway South High School, Manchester
- Pattonville High School, Maryland Heights
- Ritenour High School, St. Ann
- Riverview Gardens High School, Riverview
- St. Joseph's Academy, Frontenac
- University City High School, University City
- Ursuline Academy, Oakland
- Valley Park High School, Valley Park

=== Affton ===
- Affton High School
- Cor Jesu Academy
- Lutheran High School South

=== Ballwin ===
- Al Manara Academy
- Parkway West High School

=== Chesterfield ===
- Marquette High School
- Parkway Central High School

=== Creve Coeur ===
- Fern Ridge High School
- Parkway North High School
- Chaminade College Preparatory School
- De Smet Jesuit High School
- St. Louis Priory School
- Whitfield School

=== Des Peres ===
- Villa Duchesne
- Visitation Academy of St. Louis

=== Fenton ===
- Heritage Classical Christian Academy
- Rockwood Summit High School

=== Florissant ===
- Hazelwood Central High School
- McCluer High School
- McCluer North High School
- North County Christian School
- North Technical High School

=== Kirkwood ===
- Kirkwood High School
- St. John Vianney High School

=== Ladue ===
- Ladue Horton Watkins High School
- John Burroughs School
- Mary Institute and St. Louis Country Day School
- Westminster Christian Academy

=== Lemay ===
- Hancock High School
- Notre Dame High School

=== Normandy ===
- Normandy High School
- Lutheran High School North

=== Spanish Lake ===
- Hazelwood East High School
- Trinity Catholic High School

=== Sunset Hills ===
- Lindbergh High School
- South Technical High School
- Thomas Jefferson School

=== Town and Country ===
- Christian Brothers College High School
- Neuwoehner High School
- The Principia School

=== Webster Groves ===
- Christian Brothers College High School
- Nerinx Hall High School
- Webster Groves High School

== Ste. Genevieve County ==
- Ste. Genevieve High School
- Valle Catholic Schools - Roman Catholic (co-ed)

== Saline County ==
- Malta Bend High School, Malta Bend
- Slater High School, Slater
- Sweet Springs High School, Sweet Springs

=== Marshall ===
- Calvary Baptist School - Baptist (co-ed)
- Marshall High School

== Schuyler County ==
- Schuyler County High School, Queen City

== Scotland County ==
- Scotland County High School, Memphis

== Scott County ==
- Chaffee High School, Chaffee
- Oran High School, Oran
- Scott City High School, Scott City
- Thomas W. Kelly High School, Benton

=== Sikeston ===
- Scott County Central High School
- Sikeston High School

== Shannon County ==
- Eminence High School, Eminence
- Winona High School, Winona

== Shelby County ==
- Heartland Christian Academy, Bethel - Pentecostal (co-ed)
- North Shelby High School, Shelbyville

=== Shelbina ===
- South Shelby High School
- Shiloh Christian School - nondenominational Christian (co-ed)

== Stoddard County ==
- Advance High School, Advance
- Bell City High School, Bell City
- Bernie High School, Bernie
- Bloomfield High School, Bloomfield
- Dexter High School, Dexter
- Puxico High School, Puxico
- Richland High School, Essex

== Stone County ==
- Blue Eye High School, Blue Eye
- Crane High School, Crane
- Galena High School, Galena
- Hurley High School, Hurley

=== Reeds Spring ===
- Gibson Technical Center
- New Horizons Alternative School
- Reeds Spring High School

== Sullivan County ==
- Green City High School, Green City
- Milan High School, Milan
- Newtown-Harris High School, Newtown

== Taney County ==
- Bradleyville High School, Bradleyville
- Branson High School, Branson
- Forsyth High School, Forsyth

=== Hollister ===
- Hollister High School
- Trinity Christian Academy - nondenominational Christian (co-ed)

== Texas County ==
- Cabool High School, Cabool
- Houston High School, Houston
- Licking High School, Licking
- Plato High School, Plato
- Summersville High School, Summersville

== Vernon County ==
- Bronaugh High School, Bronaugh
- Nevada High School, Nevada
- Northeast Vernon County High School, Walker
- Sheldon High School, Sheldon

== Warren County ==
- Warrenton High School, Warrenton
- Wright City High School, Wright City

== Washington County ==
- Kingston High School, Cadet
- Potosi High School, Potosi
- Valley High School, Caledonia

== Wayne County ==
- Greenville High School, Greenville
- New Hope Christian Academy, Silva - Baptist (co-ed)

=== Piedmont ===
- Clearwater High School
- Victory Baptist Academy - Baptist (co-ed)

== Webster County ==
- Fordland High School, Fordland
- Niangua High School, Niangua
- Seymour High School, Seymour

=== Marshfield ===
- Marshfield Christian School - nondenominational Christian (co-ed)
- Marshfield High School

== Worth County ==
- Worth County High School, Grant City

== Wright County ==
- Hartville High School, Hartville
- Mansfield High School, Mansfield

=== Mountain Grove ===
- Mountain Grove Christian Academy- nondenominational Christian (co-ed)
- Mountain Grove High School
- Ozark Mountain Technical Center

=== Norwood ===
- Liberty Faith Christian Academy - nondenominational Christian (co-ed)
- Norwood High School

== See also ==
- List of school districts in Missouri
