= Tri-County Conference (Central Missouri) =

High school athletic conference in Missouri, US

- Association: MSHSAA
- Founded: 1932
- No. of teams: 8
- Region: Mid-Missouri

The Tri-County Conference is a high school athletic conference located in Mid-Missouri. The conference members are located in Boone, Cole, Cooper, Miller, and Moniteau counties.

== Member schools ==
=== Current members ===
| School | Nickname | Colors | City | County | 9–12 Enrollment (2024) | Primary MSHSAA Classification | Type | Joined |
|---|---|---|---|---|---|---|---|---|
| Blair Oaks | Falcons | | Wardsville | Cole | 457 | Class 3 | Public | 1976 |
| Boonville | Pirates | | Boonville | Cooper | 569 | Class 3 | Public | 2018 (Note: Boonville had joined the conference for the 1969-70 season. They rejoined in 2018.) |
| California | Pintos | | California | Moniteau | 422 | Class 3 | Public | 1932 |
| Eldon | Mustangs | | Eldon | Miller | 584 | Class 3 | Public | 1932 |
| Fulton | Hornets | | Fulton | Callaway | 678 | Class 4 | Public | 2026 |
| Hallsville | Indians | | Hallsville | Boone | 448 | Class 3 | Public | 2012 |
| Osage | Indians | | Osage Beach | Miller | 676 | Class 4 | Public | 1934 |
| Southern Boone | Eagles | | Ashland | Boone | 540 | Class 4 | Public | 2012 |

=== Former members ===
| School | Nickname | City | County | Type | Joined | Left | Current Conference |
|---|---|---|---|---|---|---|---|
| Camdenton | Lakers | Camdenton | Camden | Public | 1954 | 1983 | Central Missouri Activities Conference |
| Iberia | Rangers | Iberia | Miller | Public | 1963 | 1977 | Frisco League |
| Stover | Bulldogs | Stover | Morgan | Public | 1946 | 1968 | Kaysinger Conference |
| Tipton | Cardinals | Tipton | Moniteau | Public | 1932 | 2000 | Central State 8 |
| Versailles | Tigers | Versailles | Morgan | Public | 1932 | 2023 | Ozark Highlands Conference |
| Warsaw | Wildcats | Warsaw | Benton | Public | 1984 | 2018 | Ozark Highlands Conference |
| Windsor | Greyhounds | Windsor | Henry | Public | 1970 | 1974 | Kaysinger Conference |

=== Membership timeline ===
Members

== State championships ==
=== Football ===
- 1990 - Warsaw
- 1993 - Warsaw
- 1997 - California
- 2004 - Blair Oaks
- 2006 - Blair Oaks
- 2018 - Blair Oaks
- 2020 - Blair Oaks
- 2022 - Blair Oaks
- 2024 - Blair Oaks
- 2025 - Blair Oaks

=== Boys' basketball ===
- 2001 - Blair Oaks

=== Boys' golf ===
- 1994 - Versailles
- 1997 - Tipton
- 2000 - Eldon
- 2001 - Eldon
- 2021 - California
- 2025 - Eldon
- 2026 - Eldon

=== Boys' wrestling ===
- 2014 - Blair Oaks

=== Baseball ===
- 2006 - Blair Oaks
- 2007 - Blair Oaks
- 2019 - Blair Oaks
- 2022 - Southern Boone
- 2024 - Blair Oaks
- 2026 - Blair Oaks

=== Boys' track & field ===
- 1973 - Camdenton

=== Girls' golf ===
- 2022 - Osage
- 2023 - Osage
- 2025 - Eldon
- 2026 - Blair Oaks

=== Volleyball ===
- 1991 - Eldon
- 2021 - Blair Oaks
- 2022 - Blair Oaks
- 2023 - Blair Oaks

=== Softball ===
- 2009 - Blair Oaks
- 2010 - Warsaw
- 2021 - Blair Oaks

=== Scholar Bowl ===
- 2014 - Hallsville
- 2015 - Hallsville
- 2018 - Hallsville

=== Boys' soccer ===
- 2020 - Southern Boone

== Conference Champions ==
=== Football ===
Championships by school
| Team | Season | Total |
|---|---|---|
| Blair Oaks | 1978–present | 20 |
| Boonville | 2018–present | 0 |
| California | 1959–present | 21 |
| Camdenton | 1959–1982 | 15 |
| Eldon | 1959–present | 9 |
| Hallsville | 2012–present | 1 |
| Iberia | 1966–1976 | 0 |
| Osage | 1959–present | 4 |
| Southern Boone | 2012–present | 0 |
| Tipton | 1959–1999 | 2 |
| Versailles | 1959–2022 | 5 |
| Warsaw | 1984–2016 | 8 |
| Windsor | 1970–1973 | 0 |

Champions by season
| Season | Champion |
|---|---|
| 1959 | California |
| 1959 | Camdenton |
| 1960 | California |
| 1961 | California |
| 1962 | Eldon |
| 1963 | Eldon |
| 1964 | Camdenton |
| 1965 | Camdenton |
| 1966 | California |
| 1966 | Camdenton |
| 1966 | Eldon |
| 1967 | California |
| 1968 | Camdenton |
| 1969 | Eldon |
| 1970 | Versailles |
| 1971 | Camdenton |
| 1971 | Versailles |
| 1972 | Camdenton |
| 1972 | Eldon |
| 1973 | Camdenton |
| 1974 | California |
| 1974 | Tipton |
| 1975 | Camdenton |
| 1976 | Camdenton |
| 1977 | Camdenton |
| 1978 | Blair Oaks |
| 1978 | California |
| 1978 | Camdenton |
| 1979 | Camdenton |
| 1980 | Camdenton |
| 1981 | Camdenton |
| 1982 | Camdenton |
| 1983 | California |
| 1984 | Osage |
| 1984 | Versailles |
| 1985 | Osage |
| 1986 | California |
| 1986 | Eldon |
| 1986 | Osage |
| 1987 | Tipton |
| 1988 | Eldon |
| 1989 | Warsaw |
| 1990 | Eldon |
| 1990 | Osage |
| 1990 | Warsaw |
| 1991 | Blair Oaks |
| 1991 | Eldon |
| 1991 | Warsaw |
| 1992 | Warsaw |
| 1993 | Warsaw |
| 1994 | Warsaw |
| 1995 | Warsaw |
| 1996 | California |
| 1997 | California |
| 1998 | California |
| 1999 | California |
| 2000 | California |
| 2001 | Versailles |
| 2002 | Versailles |
| 2003 | Blair Oaks |
| 2004 | Blair Oaks |
| 2005 | Blair Oaks |
| 2006 | Blair Oaks |
| 2007 | Blair Oaks |
| 2008 | Blair Oaks |
| 2009 | Warsaw |
| 2010 | Blair Oaks |
| 2011 | Osage |
| 2012 | California |
| 2013 | Blair Oaks |
| 2014 | California |
| 2015 | Blair Oaks |
| 2016 | Blair Oaks |
| 2017 | Blair Oaks |
| 2018 | Blair Oaks |
| 2019 | Blair Oaks |
| 2020 | Blair Oaks |
| 2021 | Hallsville |
| 2022 | Blair Oaks |
| 2023 | Blair Oaks |
| 2024 | Blair Oaks |
| 2025 | Blair Oaks |
