= Harrisburg High School =

Harrisburg High School may refer to:

- Harrisburg High School (Arkansas), located in Harrisburg, Arkansas
- Harrisburg High School (Illinois), located in Harrisburg, Illinois
- Harrisburg High School (Missouri), located in Harrisburg, Missouri
- Harrisburg High School (Oregon), located in Harrisburg, Oregon
- Harrisburg High School (Pennsylvania), located in Harrisburg, Pennsylvania
- Harrisburg Technical High School, located in Harrisburg, Pennsylvania
- Harrisburg High School (South Dakota), located in Harrisburg, South Dakota

== See also ==
- Harrisburg School
