= Veritas Christian Academy =

Veritas Christian Academy may refer to:

- Veritas Christian Academy (Missouri) - O'Fallon, Missouri
- Veritas Christian Academy - Wayland, Massachusetts
- Veritas Christian Academy - Sparta, New Jersey
- Veritas Classical Christian Academy - Hobbs, New Mexico
- Veritas Christian Academy - Fletcher, North Carolina
- Veritas Christian Academy of Houston - Bellaire, Texas (Houston area)
