= Žaloudek =

Czech surname

Žaloudek (feminine: Žaloudková) is a Czech surname. It is a diminutive of žalud, i.e. 'acorn'. Notable people with the surname include:

- Tiffany Zaloudek, American military officer
