= Columbia Public Library =

Public library of Columbia, Missouri, US

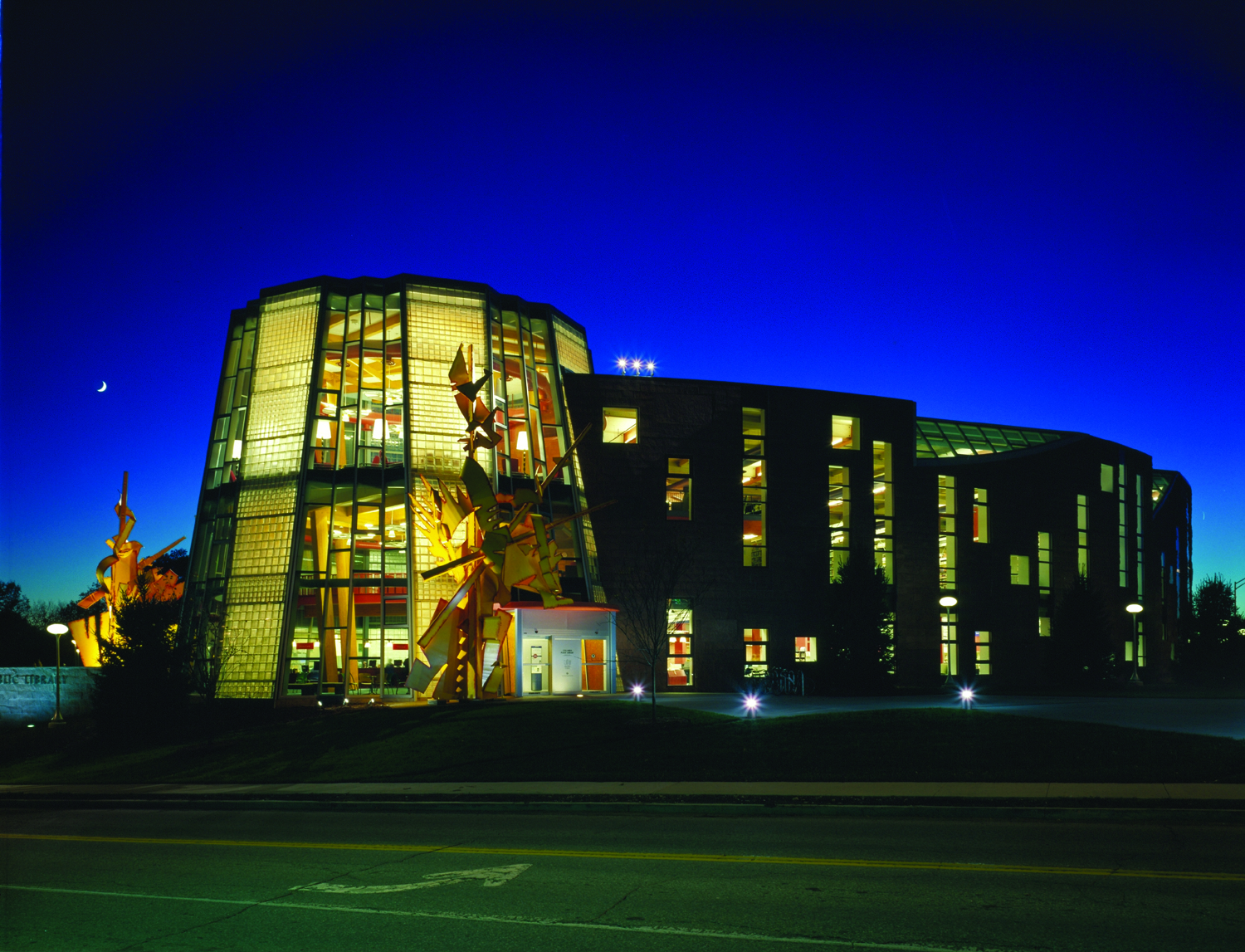
- Columbia Public Library, founded 1922, looking at north side of new 2002 building, at 100 West Broadway and Garth Street, Columbia, (Boone County), Missouri, part of four branches of Daniel Boone Regional Library system in Mid-Missouri
- Type: Public library system
- Established: 1922 (CPL), 1954/1959 (DBRL)
- Service area: Columbia, Missouri and surrounding towns

Access and use
- Circulation: 2,947,435 check-outs across DBRL system (2025)
- Population served: 227,893 people in library district, 94,603 cardholders

Other information
- Budget: $16,912,991 (2025)
- Director: Robin Westphal (Nov. 2024 -)
- Public transit access: Go COMO
- Website: www.dbrl.org

The Columbia Public Library (CPL) is the public library of Columbia, Missouri, and was established as a tax-funded public library in the town in 1922. It is the headquarters of the Daniel Boone Regional Library system (DBRL), which serves the city of Columbia, (the county seat of surrounding Boone County), and the surrounding adjacent Howard and Callaway Counties / areas.

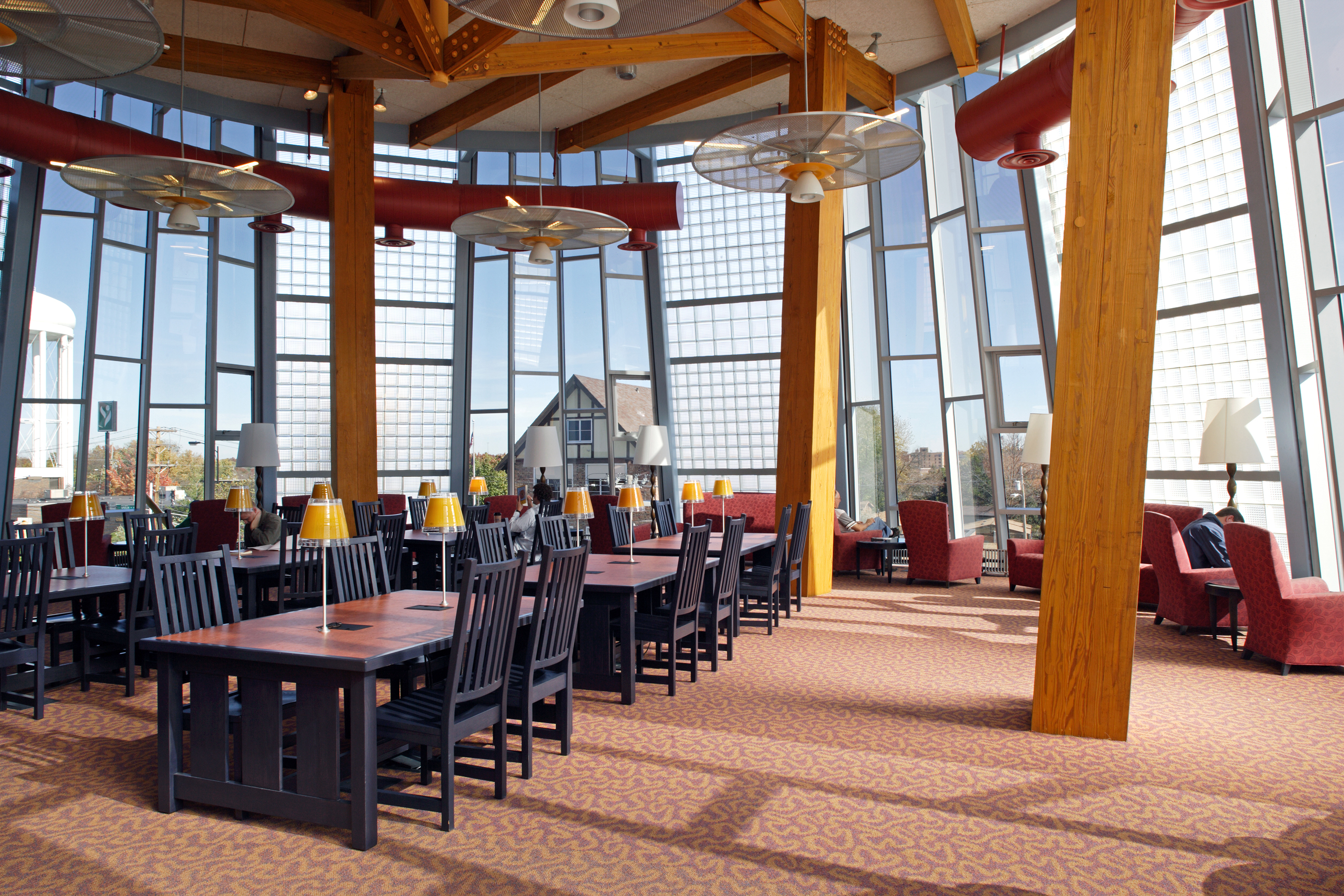
Columbia Public Library interior, of recently built structure of 2002, at Garth and Broadway, part of the Daniel Boone Regional Library system

The previous library building was demolished and reconstructed at its current location on Garth and Broadway in 2002. The Columbia Library District merged with the Boone County Library District in 2017, which went into effect on January 1, 2018, to create the Columbia and Boone County Library District. In 2025, Columbia Public Library had a circulation of 1,312,631 check-outs from its branch.

Prior to receiving tax support, the town public library ran on donations and moved across numerous downtown locations over the decades of the 20th century. Soon after the Tuesday Club organized in town in 1899 as a women's literary and culture society, they helped to establish, purchase, stock, and run a free public library in Columbia.

The community narrowly voted down a library town / county tax levy in 1917, but five years later in 1922, the library tax levy finally won 75% of the vote. 1922 was notably the first chance that Columbia and Missouri's women had the right to vote on the issue, with the passage and ratification two years earlier in 1920, of the 19th Amendment to the Constitution of the United States of 1787, approving women's suffrage / voting.

== Daniel Boone Regional Library ==
The Daniel Boone Regional Library (DBRL) system was established in 1959 as a joining of the earlier established Boone, Howard, and Callaway counties public libraries, together with the county seat town of Boone County of the Columbia Public Library. The Daniel Boone Regional Library serves two districts: the Columbia and Boone County Library District (CBCLD) and the Callaway County Library District (CCLD). The library system is governed by the DBRL Board of Trustees, a group of 14 volunteers who are appointed by a mayor or county commissioner - nine members are from CBCLD and serve 3-year terms, and five are from CCLD and serve 4-year terms.

In 2025, DBRL had a cumulative circulation of 2,947,435, including ebooks, digital audiobooks, and digital magazines, and its libraries were visited a total of 489,863 times. The library system's collection contains 528,163 total items, including books, ebooks, DVDs and CDs, physical and downloadable audiobooks, and devices and kits.

The Daniel Boone Regional Library system has the following four branches:

- Columbia Public Library – 100 West Broadway and Garth Street,
  Columbia, Missouri 65203
- Callaway County Public Library – 710 Court Street,
  Fulton, Missouri 65251
- Holts Summit Public Library – 188 West Simon Boulevard,
  Holts Summit, Missouri 65043
- Southern Boone County Public Library- 109 North Main Street,
  Ashland, Missouri 65010

The Daniel Boone Regional Library system also has three traveling / rotating bookmobiles. The largest bookmobile regularly stops in Columbia, Auxvasse, Hallsville, Harrisburg, Rocheport, and Sturgeon.

== Overdue fines ==
CPL experimented with eliminating overdue fines starting July, 1961 for a six-month trial period. The Board of Trustees voted to continue the practice permanently, and the positive results prompted the Board to extend the practice to the Fulton Public Library in 1962. It was common for public libraries around the United States to forgive fines for a brief amnesty period, but the practice of discontinuing late fees did not catch on more widely until the 2010s.

== Daniel Boone Regional Library Workers United ==
In May 2022, DBRL employees voted 101 – 55 to form Daniel Boone Regional Library Workers United (DBRLWU), AFSCME Local 3311, AFSCME Council 61. This is the first active library workers' union in Missouri. DBRL ratified their first contract in December 2023, which went into effect on January 1, 2024.

== See also ==
The Urban Libraries Council's Fine Free Libraries Map.
