= Fairfax High School (Fairfax, Missouri) =

Location
- 500 Main Street; Fairfax, Missouri 64446; United States
- Coordinates: 40°20′22″N 95°23′23″W

Information
- School district: Fairfax R-III School District
- Principal: Jeremy Burright
- Teaching staff: 9.78 (on an FTE basis)
- Grades: 7-12
- Enrollment: 68 (2024-2025)
- Student to teacher ratio: 6.95
- Colors: Green and white
- Nickname: Bulldogs
- Website: fairfaxk12mo.us

Fairfax High School is a rural secondary school (grades 7-12) in Fairfax, Atchison County, Missouri.

== District ==
Fairfax High School is part of the Fairfax R-III School District. Fairfax Elementary School (K-6) feeds into Fairfax High School.

== See also ==
- List of high schools in Missouri
