= Atchison County Library =

Library in Missouri, U.S.

- 40°24′47.8″N 95°30′53.38″W
- Location: 200 South Main, Rock Port, MO 64482, United States
- Type: Public Library
- Branches: 3

Collection
- Size: 43,491

Access and use
- Circulation: 44,910
- Population served: 5,685

Other information
- Director: Robert Simpson
- Website: http://acl.tlcdelivers.com/

The Atchison County Library is a public library with three locations in Atchison County, Missouri.

The Central Library is located in Rock Port, Missouri, the Fairfax branch in Fairfax, Missouri and the Tarkio branch in Tarkio, Missouri.

== Services ==
- Fax (Rock Port)
- Copy
- Scan to e-mail
- Public Access Computers
- Public WiFi
- Interlibrary Loan
- Genealogy Room (Rock Port) - County newspapers on microfilm dating back to 1880, County history books, County cemetery books, plat maps, family histories, etc.
- Ancestry.com (basic)
- Accelerated Reading Program - search in our catalog

Services List
