= North Nodaway County R-VI School District =

School district in Missouri, U.S.

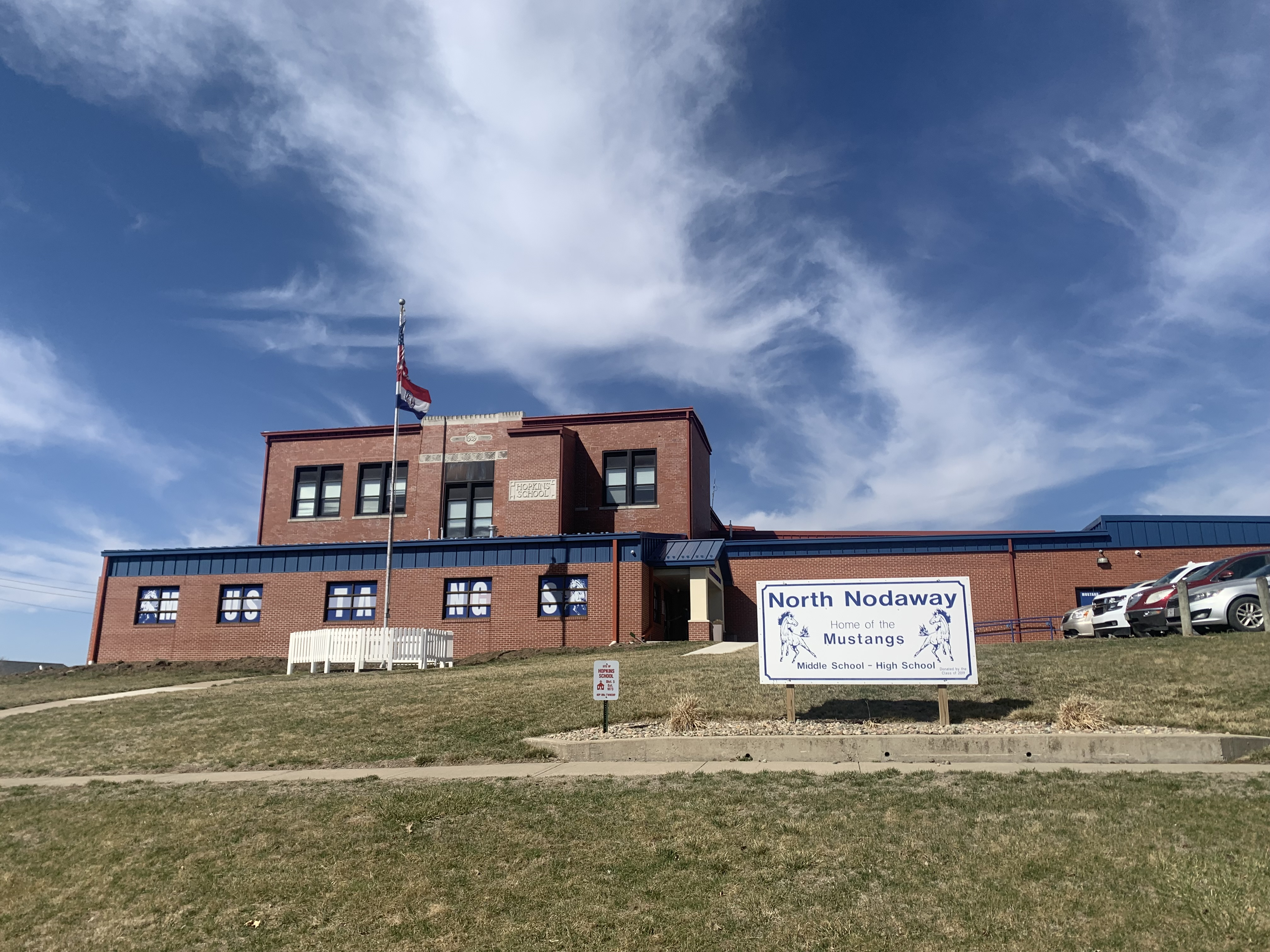

North Nodaway County R-VI School District is a school district headquartered in Hopkins, Missouri, and has Pickering in its attendance boundary. It operates an elementary school in Pickering and a junior-senior high school in Hopkins, with the latter including the district headquarters.

The elementary school incorporates grades Pre-K through 5 and the junior-senior high school has grades 6 through 12.

Their mascot is the Mustang and their colors are blue and white.

== Demographics ==
According to the data for the 2023–2024 school year, there were 202 students in the school district; 103 students in the elementary school and 99 students in the high school. There were 35 certified staff between the schools; 16 for the elementary school and 19 for the high school.
