= Jeff Farnan =

American politician

Member of the Missouri House of Representatives from the 1st district
- Incumbent
- Assumed office January 4, 2023
- Preceded by: Allen Andrews

Personal details
- Born: Nodaway County, Missouri, U.S.
- Party: Republican

Jeff Farnan is an American politician serving as a Republican member of the Missouri House of Representatives, representing the state's 1st House district.

== Early life and education ==
Farnan was born and raised in Nodaway County and attended South Nodaway High School.

== Career ==
Farnan is a farmer, business owner and member of the Jefferson C-123 School District.

In the 2022 Missouri House of Representatives election, Farnan was elected in District 1, defeating Democratic candidate social media personality Jess Piper.

== Political positions ==
He is a conservative who supports pro-life, pro-2nd Amendment, and pro-law enforcement policies.
