= Allen Andrews (politician) =

American Republican politician

Member of the Missouri House of Representatives from the 1st district
- In office January 7, 2015 – January 4, 2023
- Preceded by: Mike Thompson
- Succeeded by: Jeff Farnan

Personal details
- Born: February 5, 1967 (age 59) St. Joseph, Missouri, U.S.
- Party: Republican
- Spouse: Robin Andrews

Allen Andrews (born February 5, 1967) is an American Republican politician and business owner. Before entering politics Andrews operated the Wool Shop, a company specializing in wool cleaning products. Andrews represented the 1st district in the Missouri House of Representatives from 2015 to 2023, and served as Majority Whip from 2021-2023. In 2022 Missouri Governor Mike Parson appointed Andrews as the Director of the Division of Employment Security (the state's unemployment insurance agency) within the Missouri Department of Labor and Industrial Relations.

== Electoral history ==
Missouri House of Representatives Primary Election, August 5, 2014, District 1
Party	Candidate	Votes	%	±%
Republican	Allen Andrews	4,024	63.86%	
Republican	Robert Parshall	1,167	18.52%	
Republican	Kathy DeVault	642	10.19%	
Republican	Stan Sportsman	468	7.43%	

Missouri House of Representatives Election, November 4, 2014, District 1
Party	Candidate	Votes	%	±%
Republican	Allen Andrews	7,479	79.50%	−20.50
Democratic	Robert Ritterbusch	1,929	20.50%	+20.50

Missouri House of Representatives Election, November 8, 2016, District 1
Party	Candidate	Votes	%	±%
Republican	Allen Andrews	14,022	100.00%	+20.50

Missouri House of Representatives Election, November 6, 2018, District 1
Party	Candidate	Votes	%	±%
Republican	Allen Andrews	10,023	78.95%	−21.05
Democratic	Paul Taylor	2,672	21.05%	+21.05

Missouri House of Representatives Election, November 3, 2020, District 1
Party	Candidate	Votes	%	±%
Republican	Allen Andrews	14,724	100.00%	−21.05
