= North Nodaway High School (Missouri) =

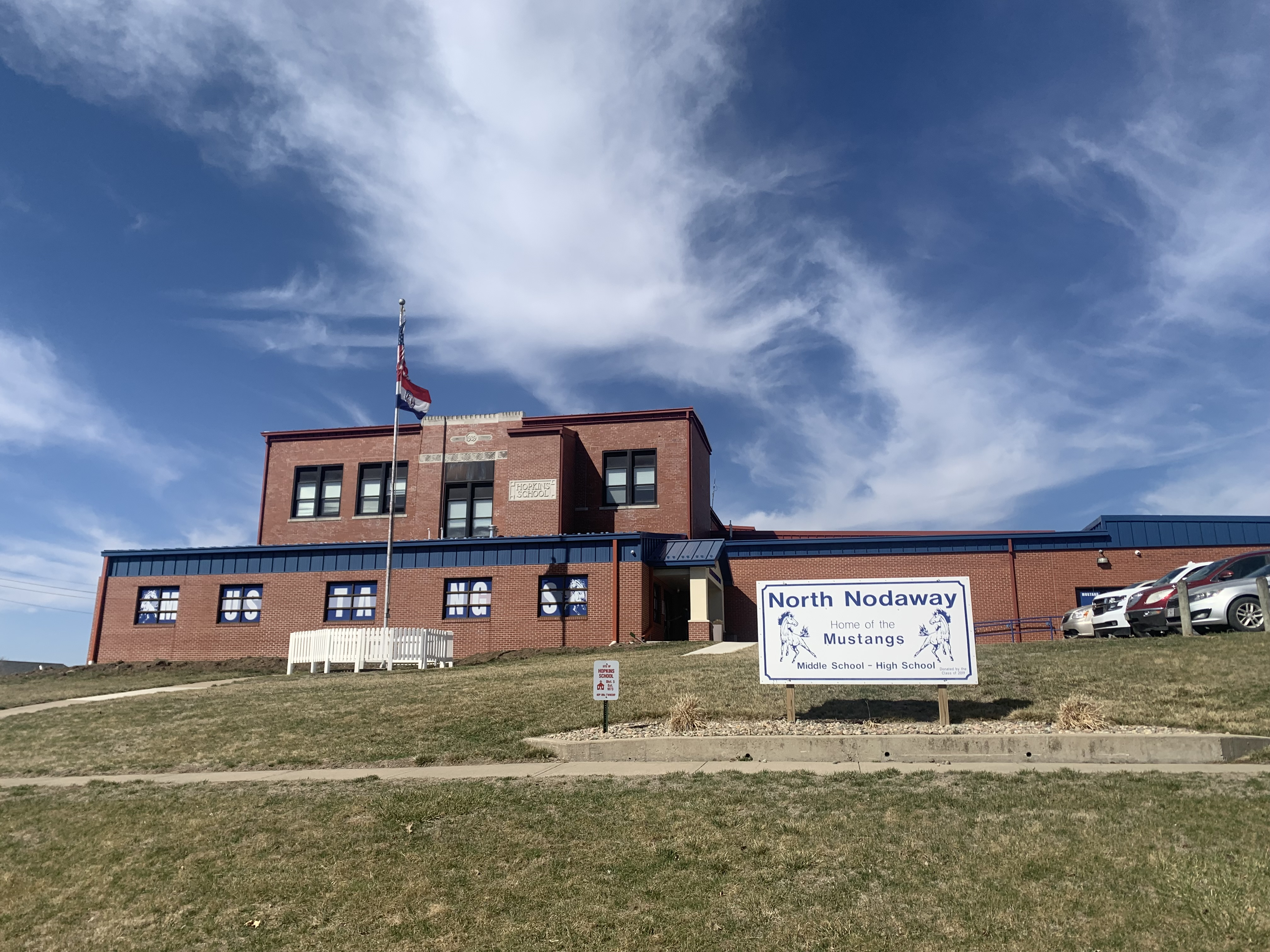

Location
- 705 E Barnard St; Hopkins, Missouri 64461; United States
- Coordinates: 40°33′05″N 94°48′49″W

Information
- Type: Public
- Principal: Mr. Roger Johnson
- Staff: 19
- Grades: 6-12
- Enrollment: 99 (2023-2024)
- Student to teacher ratio: 5.21
- Color
- Mascot: Mustang
- Website: School website

North Nodaway High School is a public high school in Hopkins, Missouri, United States, serving grades 6-12 for the North Nodaway County R-VI School District.

== See also ==
- Education in Missouri
- List of colleges and universities in Missouri
- List of high schools in Missouri
- Missouri Department of Elementary and Secondary Education
