= Nodaway-Holt High School (Missouri) =

Coordinates: 40°11′56″N 95°02′25″W

Location
- 318 S Taylor St; Graham, Missouri 64455; United States

Information
- Type: Public
- Motto: "Quality Education Today for a Successful Tomorrow"
- School district: Nodaway-Holt R-VII School District
- Principal: Nate Jeter
- Teaching staff: 9.60 (FTE)
- Enrollment: 90 (2023-2024)
- Student to teacher ratio: 9.38
- Colors: Red and white
- Mascot: Trojans
- Website: www.nodholt.org

Nodaway-Holt High School is the public high school for Graham, Missouri, serving grades 7–12.

== See also ==
- Education in Missouri
- List of colleges and universities in Missouri
- List of high schools in Missouri
- Missouri Department of Elementary and Secondary Education
