= Lone Jack School District =

School district in Missouri, U.S.

Lone Jack School C-6 District

Location
- 313 S. Bynum Road, Lone Jack, MO 64070

District information
- Type: Local (Public) school district
- Grades: K–12
- Superintendent: Kathy Butler
- Schools: 3

Other information
- Website: www.lonejackc6.net

Lone Jack School C-6 District is headquartered in Lone Jack, Missouri, United States.

== Schools ==
- Lone Jack Elementary
- Lone Jack Middle School
- Lone Jack High School
