= Eva Johnston =

Archaeologist, glass expert

- Painting of Eva Johnston
- Born: 14 May 1865; Ashland, Missouri, US
- Died: 30 November 1941 (aged 76); Columbia, Missouri, US
- Occupations: Latin teacher Academic
- Known for: First woman to receive a doctorate from the University of Königsberg

Academic background
- Education: University of Königsberg
- Thesis: De sermone terentiano quaestiones duae (1905)

Academic work
- Discipline: Classics
- Sub-discipline: Latin comedy
- Institutions: Columbia High School; University of Missouri

Eva Johnston (14 May 1865 – 30 November 1941) was an American philologist and classical scholar. She was the first woman to receive a doctorate from the University of Königsberg and was second woman professor at the University of Missouri.

== Biography ==
Johnston attended school in Ashland, Missouri before further educated at Stephens College in Columbia and then at the University of Missouri from 1892. She worked as a Latin tutor at the university before spending time as a teaching fellow. She was the chair of Latin at Columbia High School.

From 1899 Johnston studied under Richard Heinze at the University of Berlin. From 1901-1904 she returned to the University of Missouri as the assistant professor of Latin. She again left Missouri, in 1904, to return to her graduate studies under Heinze. He was, by this time, at the University of Königsberg. Her research focussed on Latin comedy. In 1905 Johnston was the first woman to earn a doctorate from that institution. Her thesis was titled "De sermone terentiano quaestiones duae".

Johnston again returned to Missouri to teach Latin. She became the advisor to women from 1912-1921, latterly the Dean of Women from 1922. Johnstone became full professor of Latin in 1931, retiring two years later. She was named as a professor emeritus of Latin in 1938.

Johnston died on 30 November 1941. An archive of her correspondence is held at the State Historical Society of Missouri. A hall of residence at the University of Missouri, Johnston Hall, is named after her.

== Publications ==
- Johnston, Eva. 1905. "Gemination in Terence", Transactions of the American Philological Association 36.
