= South Nodaway High School (Missouri) =

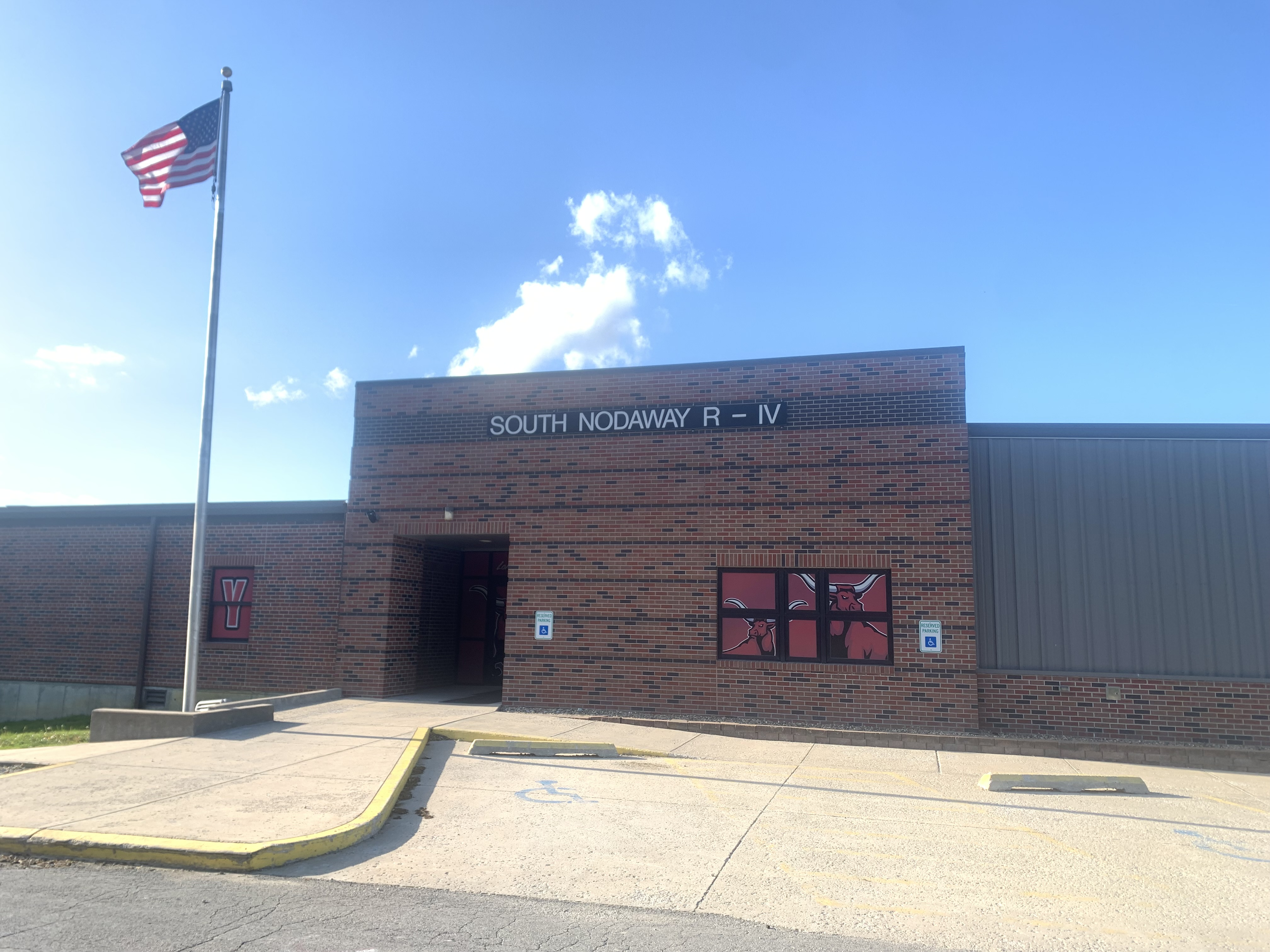

Location
- 209 Morehouse; Barnard, Missouri 64423; United States
- Coordinates: 40°10′39″N 94°49′18″W

Information
- Type: Public
- Principal: Aaron Murphy
- Staff: 8.25 (FTE)
- Enrollment: 66 (2023-2024)
- Student to teacher ratio: 8.00
- Color
- Mascot: Longhorn
- Website: www.southnodaway.k12.mo.us

South Nodaway High School is a public high school in Barnard, Missouri, United States, serving grades 7–12.

== Alumni ==
- Jeff Farnan, Missouri state legislator.

== See also ==
- Education in Missouri
- List of high schools in Missouri
- Missouri Department of Elementary and Secondary Education
