= Northeast Nodaway High School (Missouri) =

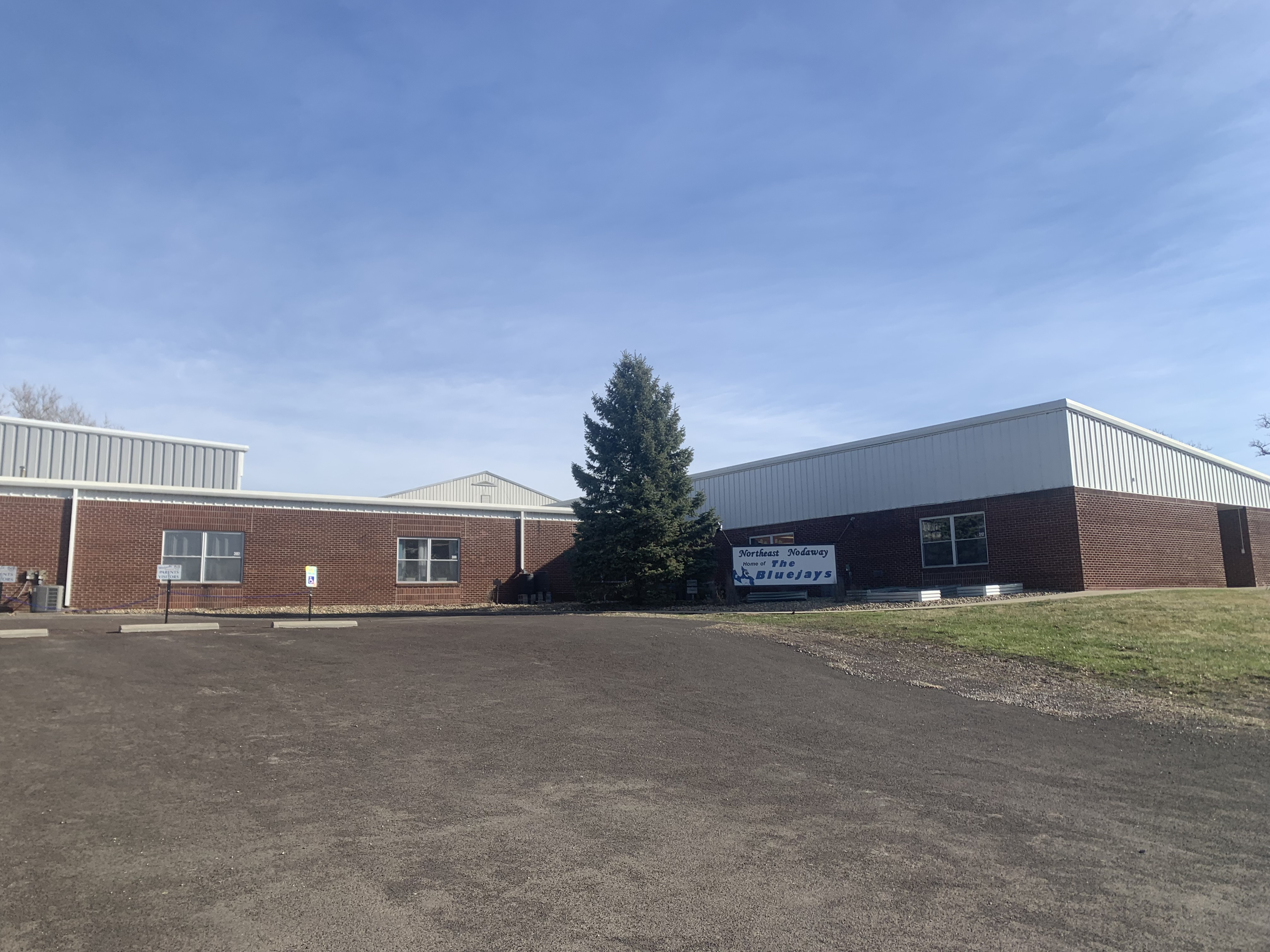

Location
- 126 S High School Ave; Ravenwood, Missouri 64479; United States; 40°21′04″N 94°40′10″W

Information
- Type: Public
- Principal: Mr. Ken Grove
- Staff: 10.20 (FTE)
- Grades: 7-12
- Enrollment: 84 (2023-2024)
- Student to teacher ratio: 8.24
- Color
- Team name: Blue Jays
- Website: nenr5.com

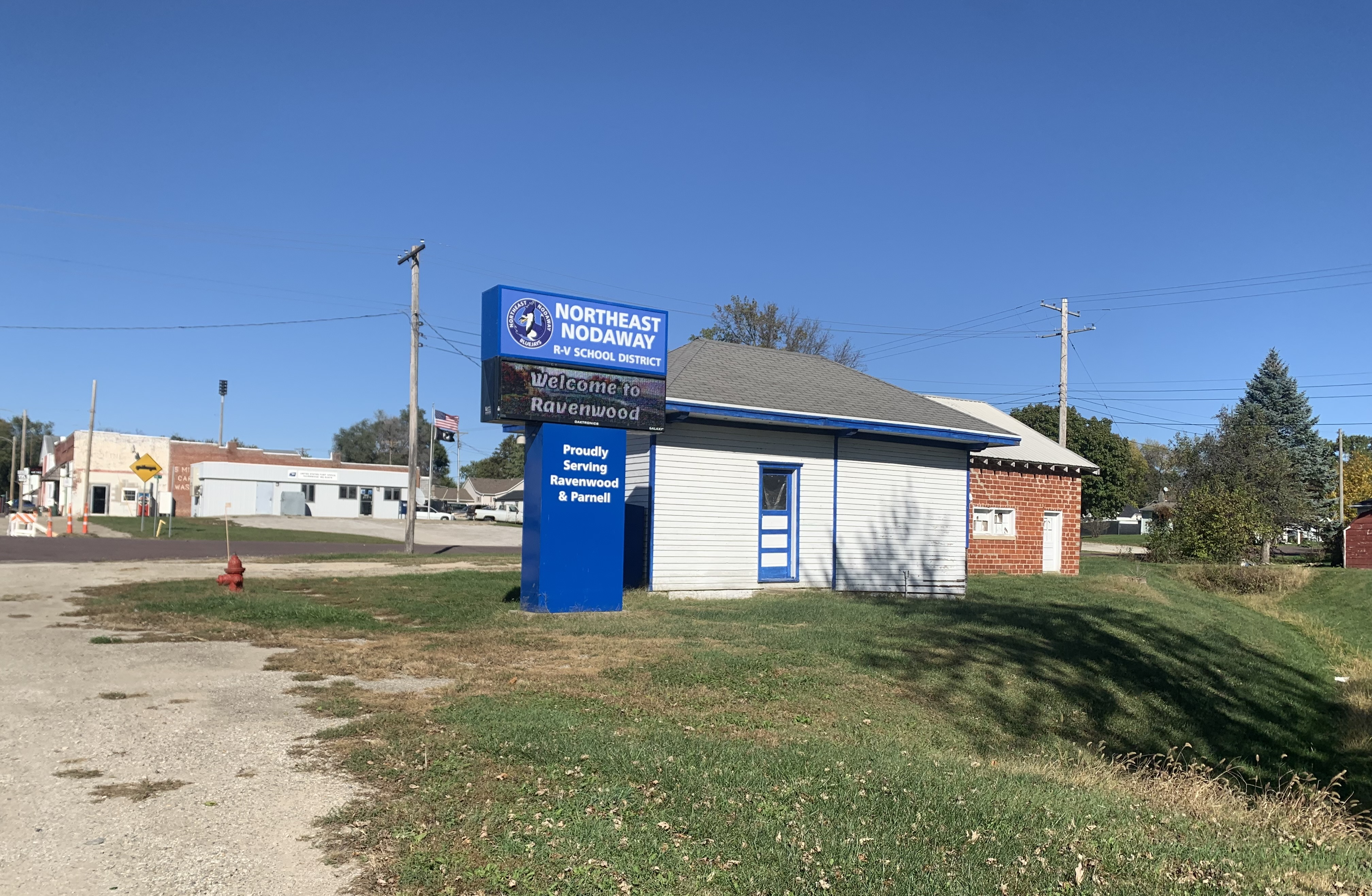
Northeast Nodaway School District building in Ravenwood

Northeast Nodaway High School is a public high school in Ravenwood, Missouri serving grades 7–12.

== See also ==
- Education in Missouri
- List of colleges and universities in Missouri
- List of high schools in Missouri
- Missouri Department of Elementary and Secondary Education
