= Harrisburg School =

- Harrisburg School / Ancient Landmark Masonic Lodge 356 A.F. & A.M.
- U.S. National Register of Historic Places
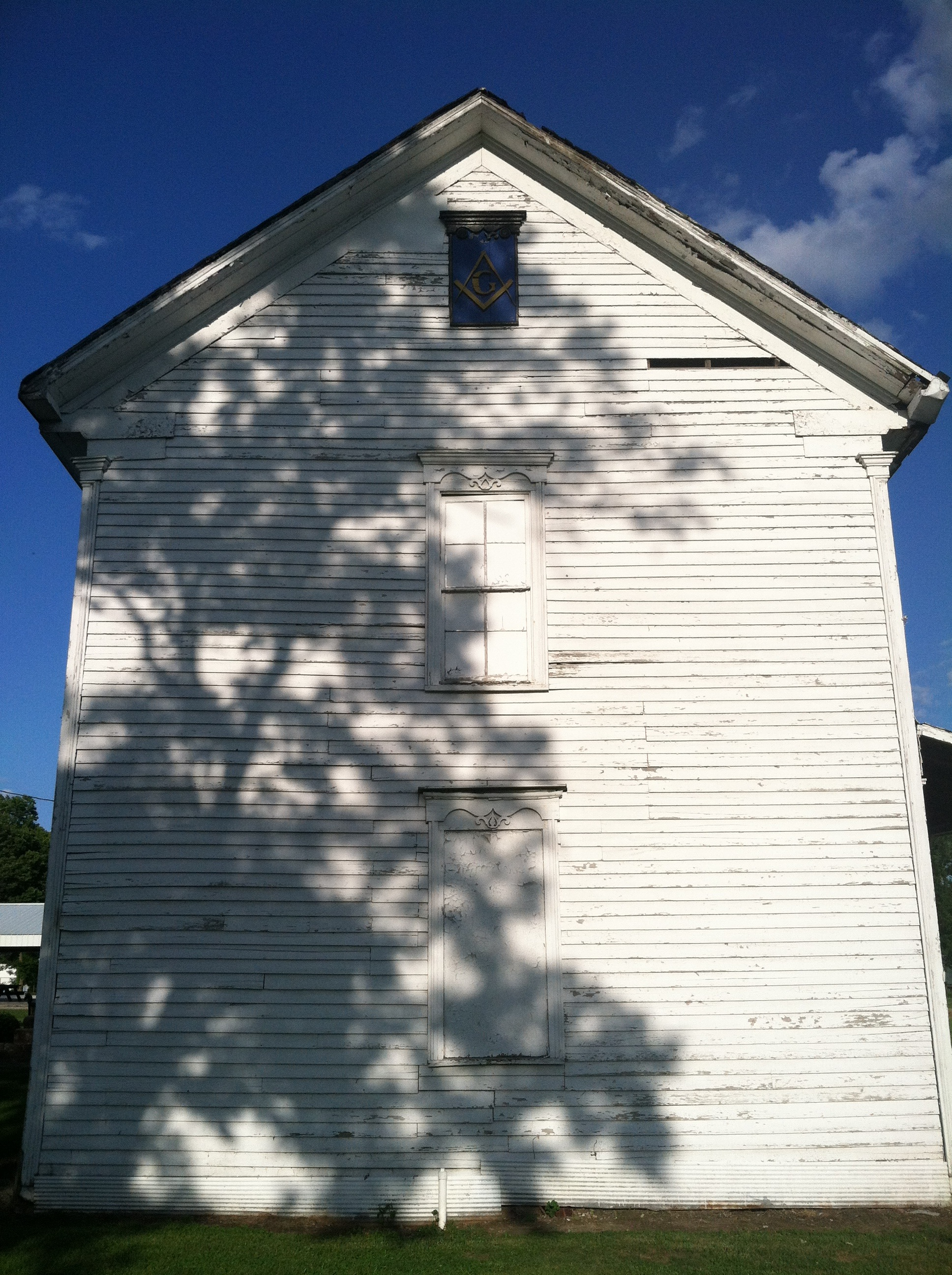

- Location within Missouri Location within the United States
- Location: 140 S. Harris St., Harrisburg, Missouri
- Coordinates: 39°8′28″N 92°27′42″W
- Area: Less than one acre
- Architectural style: vernacular
- NRHP reference No.: 13000970
- Added to NRHP: December 24, 2013

The Ancient Landmark Masonic Lodge Number 356 A.F. and A.M. is located in Harrisburg, Missouri and played a major role in the social and educational history of the town. The building was listed on the National Register of Historic Places in 2013 and houses the Order of the Eastern Star. Constructed by the Freemasons, the building served as Harrisburg's school from 1878–1963. A major addition and bell tower have been removed from the structure and time has left the building in dire need of repair.

It was listed on the National Register of Historic Places in 2013.

== See also ==
- Grand Lodge of Missouri
