= Zalma R-5 School District =

School district in Missouri, U.S.

Address
- HC02 Box 184 – School Street Zalma, Missouri, 63787-9706; United States

District information
- Type: Public
- Grades: PreK-12
- Established: 1927

Students and staff
- Enrollment: 240
- Faculty: 29
- Student–teacher ratio: 11:1
- Athletic conference: Mississippi Valley
- District mascot: Bulldogs
- Colors: Green and gold

Other information
- Website: zalma.k12.mo.us

The Zalma R-5 School District is a small, rural public school district located in the village of Zalma in Bollinger County in southeast Missouri, United States. With an average yearly enrollment of approximately 250 students in grades PreK–12, it is one of the smallest school districts in the state.

The district covers most of the southern portions of Bollinger County as well as the extreme southeastern portions of neighboring Wayne County and northeastern sections of Stoddard County.

== Composition ==
The district consists of one elementary school (Kindergarten-Grade 6) and one consolidated junior-senior high school (Grades 7–12).

The reorganized district includes residents from the small, neighboring unincorporated areas of Arab, Gipsy, Greenbrier, McGee, and Sturdivant

== Demographics ==
During the 2008–2009 academic school year, the total enrollment was 244 in the school district - 98.77% White, 0.82% Hispanic/Latino, and 0.41% Asian.

== Activities and clubs ==
- Family, Career & Community Leaders of America (FCCLA)
- Student Council
- ZHS Concert Choir
- Science Club
- BETA Club
- Fellowship of Christian Athletes (FCA)
- Smokebusters
- Speech Team
- Future Business Leaders of America (FBLA)
- Publications (newspaper/yearbook)

== Athletics ==
Zalma is a member of the Missouri State High School Activities Association (MSHSAA) and offers the following sports:

- Boys' basketball
- Girls' volleyball
- Boys' baseball
- Girls' softball
- Co-ed cheerleading
- Co-ed track and Field
- Co-ed cross country

=== Athletic accomplishments ===
- The Zalma Bulldogs varsity basketball team won the Class 1A State Basketball Championship during the 1939–1940 season.
- The Zalma Lady Bulldogs varsity volleyball team won the Class 1A State Volleyball Tournament during the 1990–1991 season, defeating Osceola for the championship. Coach Carl Ritter, Jr. was named Coach of the Year during the 1990–1991 season as well. The Lady Bulldogs made back-to-back appearances at the state tournament in Warrensburg in 1991–1992 and 1992–1993 but fell in the championship match both years to New Haven.
- The 2010–2011 Zalma Lady Bulldogs varsity volleyball team posted a 24–5 record, the best record a varsity volleyball squad has posted since the 1992–1993 state squad. The Lady Bulldogs won the Woodland Invitational Tournament for the first time in exactly a decade, defeating Leopold for the title. They made it to the Elite Eight of the Gold Bracket of the SEMO Imprints SEMO Spike High School Volleyball Classic after posting a flawless 6–0 record in pool play. During bracket play, the Lady Bulldogs defeated Bloomfield before losing in three close sets to Scott City, the then-defending Class 2 state champions who went on to win the entire tournament. The Lady Bulldogs also won the championship of the Mississippi Valley Conference Volleyball Tournament, again defeating Leopold for the title. Unable to go all the way, the Leopold Lady Wildcats stopped the Lady Bulldogs from advancing to Sectionals with a loss in the championship match at Districts. Six of the seven players made the Mississippi Valley All-Conference Team, four made the All-District Team, three made the Woodland All-Tournament Team, and two made the Southeast Missourian All Star Volleyball Team. The Lady Bulldogs were coached by Dwyght Ford.
- For the first time in the school's history, Zalma was able to field a girls' softball team during the 2010 spring season. The Lady Bulldogs were coached by Dwyght Ford.

== School newspaper ==
Students in the school district do not actually publish their own school newspaper. Instead, students in publications class format The Bulldog Growler, a half-page section in The Banner Press, the county newspaper based in Marble Hill, published weekly.

The school did publish its own school newspaper, The Echo, but retired it when The Bulldog Growler was offered by The Banner Press.

== Fight song ==
The school fight song is still sung at ballgames and pep rallies and other athletic events throughout the year. The crowd usually rises to their feet while singing and applauds during the song:

"When those green daggers lead our yells today, and the team will stand in full array, for the dear ole school we love so well, for the green and gold we'll yell and yell and yell, and yes we'll win, win win, yes we will win, and when it's over we will all begin to join the mighty cheering for our team, for Z-H-S HEY!"
