= Osage High School (Missouri) =

Coordinates: 38.1469°N 92.5909°W

- 636 Highway 42; Osage Beach, Missouri 65065; United States

Information
- Type: Public
- Established: 1933
- School district: School of the Osage R-II School District
- Principal: David Dawson
- Staff: 41.60 (on an FTE basis)
- Grades: 9-12
- Enrolment: 676 (2023–2024)
- Student to teacher ratio: 16.25
- Colours: Maroon & White
- Athletics conference: Tri-County Conference
- Nickname: Indians
- Website: www.osageschools.org/page/high-school

Osage High School, also known as School of the Osage, is a secondary school located in Osage Beach, Missouri. Approximately 96% of the students who attend the school are Caucasian, 1% are Hispanic, and the small remainder are Native American or African-American. The student to teacher ratio is 15 to 1. The school features numerous organizations and sports, and is a member of Missouri State High School Activities Association (MSHSAA).
