= Lone Jack, Missouri =

- City
- Location of Lone Jack, Missouri
- Coordinates: 38°52′14″N 94°11′17″W
- Country: United States
- State: Missouri
- County: Jackson
- Incorporated: 1980

Government
  - Mayor: Phillip Andreas
  - Mayor Pro-tem: Natasha Ortiz

Area
  - Total: 5.92 sq mi (15.34 km^{2})
  - Land: 5.92 sq mi (15.34 km^{2})
  - Water: 0 sq mi (0.00 km^{2})
- Elevation: 1,020 ft (310 m)

Population (2020)
  - Total: 1,492
  - Density: 251.9/sq mi (97.25/km^{2})
- Time zone: UTC-6 (Central (CST))
  - Summer (DST): UTC-5 (CDT)
- ZIP code: 64070
- Area code: 816
- FIPS code: 29-43760
- GNIS feature ID: 0758307
- Website: lonejackmo.org

Lone Jack is a city in Jackson County, Missouri, United States. The population was 1,492 at the 2020 U.S. census. It is part of the Kansas City metropolitan area.

== History ==
Lone Jack was platted in 1841. Its name comes from a single black jack tree that stood as a local landmark. A post office has been in operation at Lone Jack since 1839.

On August 16, 1862, Federal troops were defeated in the Battle of Lone Jack by a much larger Confederate force. The fighting literally occurred on the main street and raged for five hours before the Federals withdrew. The Confederates were unable to hold the town following their victory because of converging Union forces from other commands.

== Geography ==
Lone Jack is located at 38°52′14″N 94°11′17″W (38.870516, -94.188174). According to the United States Census Bureau, the city has a total area of 3.75 square miles (9.71 km^{2}), all land.

== Demographics ==
Historical population
Census	Pop.	Note	%±
1880	111		—
1970	199		—
1980	420		111.1%
1990	392		−6.7%
2000	528		34.7%
2010	1,050		98.9%
2020	1,492		42.1%
U.S. Decennial Census

=== Racial and ethnic composition ===
Lone Jack city, Missouri – Racial and ethnic composition Note: the US Census treats Hispanic/Latino as an ethnic category. This table excludes Latinos from the racial categories and assigns them to a separate category. Hispanics/Latinos may be of any race.
Race / Ethnicity (NH = Non-Hispanic)	Pop 2000	Pop 2010	Pop 2020	% 2000	% 2010	% 2020
White alone (NH)	501	982	1,301	94.89%	93.52%	87.20%
Black or African American alone (NH)	14	21	15	2.65%	2.00%	1.01%
Native American or Alaska Native alone (NH)	3	9	9	0.57%	0.86%	0.60%
Asian alone (NH)	2	5	16	0.38%	0.48%	1.07%
Native Hawaiian or Pacific Islander alone (NH)	0	1	0	0.00%	0.10%	0.00%
Other race alone (NH)	0	1	3	0.00%	0.10%	0.20%
Mixed race or Multiracial (NH)	4	18	96	0.76%	1.71%	6.43%
Hispanic or Latino (any race)	4	13	52	0.76%	1.24%	3.49%
Total	528	1,050	1,492	100.00%	100.00%	100.00%

=== 2010 census ===
As of the census of 2010, there were 1,050 people, 378 households, and 302 families living in the city. The population density was 280.0 inhabitants per square mile (108.1/km^{2}). There were 404 housing units at an average density of 107.7 per square mile (41.6/km^{2}). The racial makeup of the city was 94.3% White, 2.0% African American, 0.9% Native American, 0.5% Asian, 0.1% Pacific Islander, 0.5% from other races, and 1.8% from two or more races. Hispanic or Latino of any race were 1.2% of the population.

There were 378 households, of which 44.7% had children under the age of 18 living with them, 61.4% were married couples living together, 13.2% had a female householder with no husband present, 5.3% had a male householder with no wife present, and 20.1% were non-families. 14.8% of all households were made up of individuals, and 2.7% had someone living alone who was 65 years of age or older. The average household size was 2.76 and the average family size was 3.05.

The median age in the city was 32.2 years. 28.3% of residents were under the age of 18; 8.8% were between the ages of 18 and 24; 30.3% were from 25 to 44; 25.6% were from 45 to 64; and 7% were 65 years of age or older. The gender makeup of the city was 48.4% male and 51.6% female.

=== 2000 census ===
As of the census of 2000, there were 528 people, 202 households, and 153 families living in the city. The population density was 137.6 inhabitants per square mile (53.1/km^{2}). There were 214 housing units at an average density of 55.8 per square mile (21.5/km^{2}). The racial makeup of the city was 98.64% White, 0.35% African American, 0.37% Native American, 0.38% Asian, and 0.36% from two or more races. Hispanic or Latino of any race were 0.76% of the population and .13% Hawaiian.

There were 202 households, out of which 39.1% had children under the age of 18 living with them, 62.4% were married couples living together, 10.4% had a female householder with no husband present, and 23.8% were non-families. 20.3% of all households were made up of individuals, and 5.0% had someone living alone who was 65 years of age or older. The average household size was 2.61 and the average family size was 2.95.

In the city the population was spread out, with 27.5% under the age of 18, 6.6% from 18 to 24, 31.6% from 25 to 44, 25.6% from 45 to 64, and 8.7% who were 65 years of age or older. The median age was 36 years. For every 100 females, there were 97.8 males. For every 100 females age 18 and over, there were 85.9 males.

The median income for a household in the city was $51,154, and the median income for a family was $57,500. Males had a median income of $37,031 versus $31,250 for females. The per capita income for the city was $20,558. 3.6% of the population were living below the poverty line, including 7.5% of those over 64.8. No families or minors are living below the poverty line.

== Education ==
Lone Jack C-VI School District operates an elementary school, a middle school, and Lone Jack High School.

Lone Jack has a public library, a branch of the Mid-Continent Public Library.
