= Diamond High School =

Location
- 401 S Main St; Diamond, Missouri 64840; United States
- Coordinates: 36°59′26″N 94°18′47″W

Information
- Type: Public Secondary
- Principal: Chris Mettlach
- Staff: 22.00 (FTE)
- Grades: 9, 10, 11, 12
- Enrollment: 243 (2024–2025)
- Student to teacher ratio: 11.05
- Colors: Black and Gold
- Mascot: Wildcat
- Website: Diamond H.S.

Diamond High School is a high school located in Diamond, Missouri, and is part of the Diamond R-IV Schools. The mascot is the Wildcat and its colors are black and gold.
