= Fairfax, Missouri =

City in Atchison County, Missouri, United States

- City
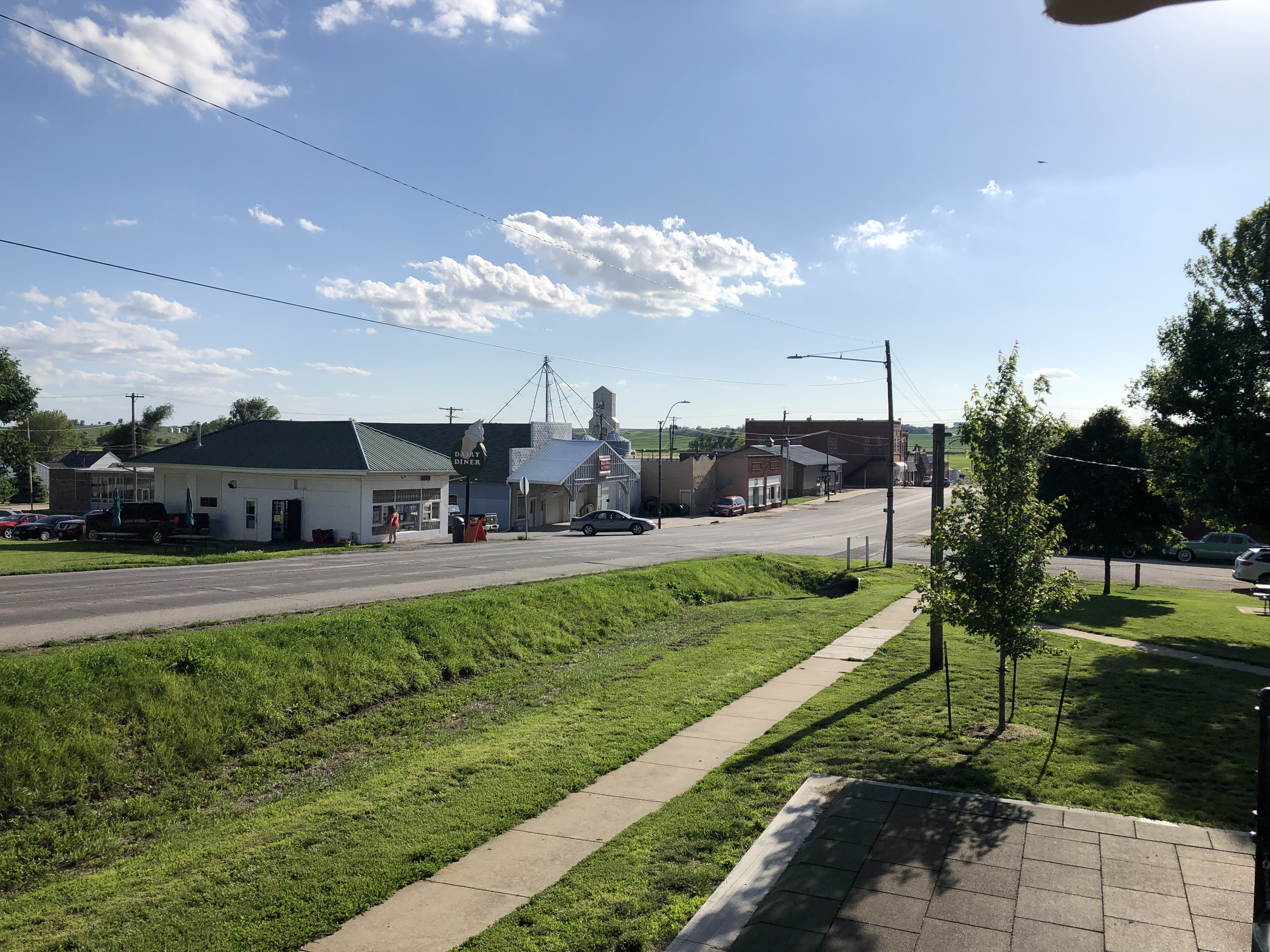
- Downtown Fairfax in June 2019

- Location of Fairfax, Missouri
- Coordinates: 40°20′21″N 95°23′31″W
- Country: United States
- State: Missouri
- County: Atchison
- Township: Clark
- Platted: April 1881
- Incorporated: November 1881

Area
  - Total: 0.47 sq mi (1.22 km^{2})
  - Land: 0.47 sq mi (1.21 km^{2})
  - Water: 0.0039 sq mi (0.01 km^{2})
- Elevation: 922 ft (281 m)

Population (2020)
  - Total: 648
  - Density: 1,392.1/sq mi (537.48/km^{2})
- Time zone: UTC-6 (Central (CST))
  - Summer (DST): UTC-5 (CDT)
- ZIP code: 64446
- Area code: 660
- FIPS code: 29-23266
- GNIS feature ID: 2394731
- Website: fairfaxmo.com

Fairfax is a city in Clark Township, Atchison County, Missouri, United States. The population was 648 at the 2020 census.

== History ==
Fairfax was platted in April 1881 and was incorporated on November 9, 1881. A post office has been in operation at Fairfax since 1881.

== Geography ==
According to the United States Census Bureau, the city has a total area of 0.48 square miles (1.24 km^{2}), of which 0.47 square miles (1.22 km^{2}) is land and 0.01 square miles (0.03 km^{2}) is water.

== Demographics ==
Historical population
Census	Pop.	Note	%±
1890	329		—
1900	666		102.4%
1910	666		0.0%
1920	704		5.7%
1930	852		21.0%
1940	813		−4.6%
1950	806		−0.9%
1960	736		−8.7%
1970	835		13.5%
1980	835		0.0%
1990	699		−16.3%
2000	645		−7.7%
2010	638		−1.1%
2020	648		1.6%
U.S. Decennial Census

=== 2010 census ===
As of the census of 2010, there were 638 people, 285 households, and 186 families residing in the city. The population density was 1,357.4 inhabitants per square mile (524.1/km^{2}). There were 343 housing units at an average density of 729.8 per square mile (281.8/km^{2}). The racial makeup of the city was 98.4% White, 0.6% African American, 0.3% Asian, and 0.6% from two or more races.

There were 285 households, of which 26.3% had children under the age of 18 living with them, 52.6% were married couples living together, 8.4% had a female householder with no husband present, 4.2% had a male householder with no wife present, and 34.7% were non-families. 30.9% of all households were made up of individuals, and 19% had someone living alone who was 65 years of age or older. The average household size was 2.24 and the average family size was 2.72.

The median age in the city was 46.8 years. 20.2% of residents were under the age of 18; 7.5% were between the ages of 18 and 24; 19.2% were from 25 to 44; 32.6% were from 45 to 64; and 20.4% were 65 years of age or older. The gender makeup of the city was 47.8% male and 52.2% female.

=== 2000 census ===
As of the census of 2000, there were 645 people, 301 households, and 180 families residing in the city. The population density was 1,345.3 inhabitants per square mile (519.4/km^{2}). There were 342 housing units at an average density of 713.3 per square mile (275.4/km^{2}). The racial makeup of the city was 98.91% White, 0.31% African American, 0.16% Native American, and 0.62% from two or more races.

There were 301 households, out of which 25.6% had children under the age of 18 living with them, 52.8% were married couples living together, 5.0% had a female householder with no husband present, and 39.9% were non-families. 37.9% of all households were made up of individuals, and 24.6% had someone living alone who was 65 years of age or older. The average household size was 2.14 and the average family size was 2.83.

In the city the population was spread out, with 22.0% under the age of 18, 5.0% from 18 to 24, 25.1% from 25 to 44, 23.4% from 45 to 64, and 24.5% who were 65 years of age or older. The median age was 44 years. For every 100 females, there were 82.7 males. For every 100 females age 18 and over, there were 80.3 males.

The median income for a household in the city was $30,156, and the median income for a family was $37,841. Males had a median income of $28,750 versus $16,667 for females. The per capita income for the city was $16,417. About 4.5% of families and 8.7% of the population were below the poverty line, including 10.5% of those under age 18 and 9.7% of those age 65 or over.

== Education ==
Fairfax R-III School District, which covers the municipality, operates one elementary school, one middle school, and Fairfax High School.

=== Public library ===
Fairfax Branch Library is a branch of the Atchison County Library.

== See also ==
- List of cities in Missouri
