= Tiffany Zaloudek =

American non-commissioned military officer

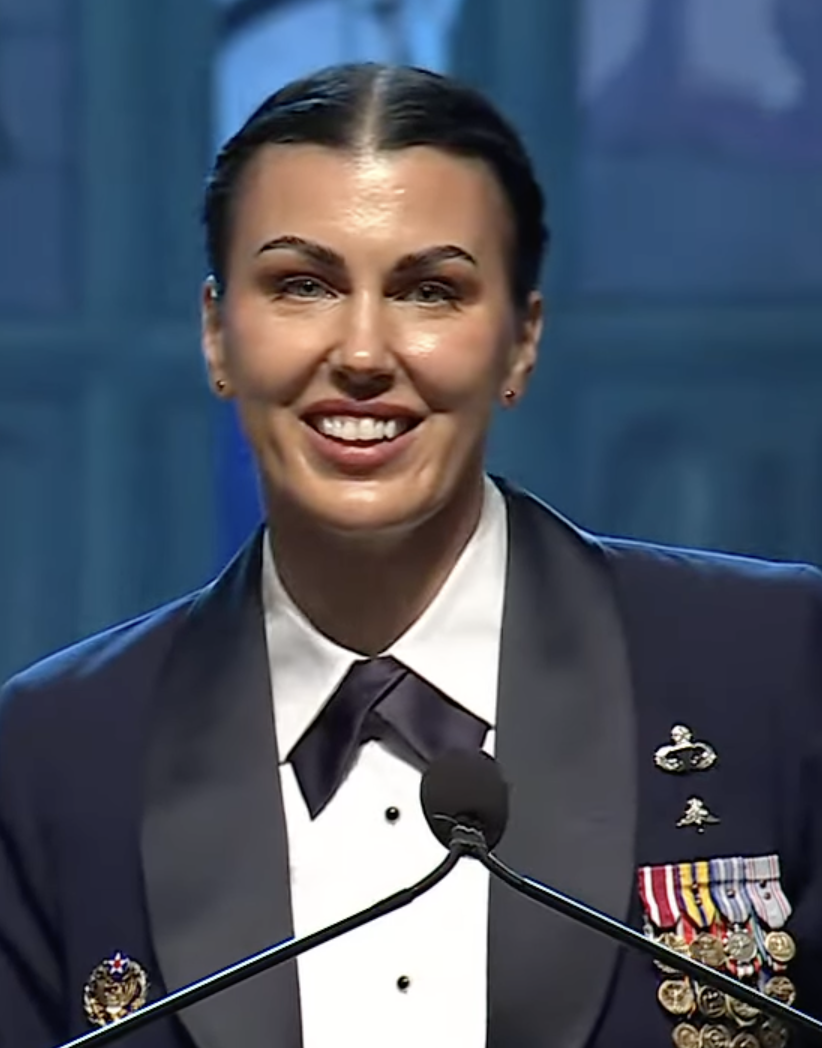
- Zaloudek at DAR Constitution Hall in 2025

Personal details
- Awards: Margaret Cochran Corbin Award

Military service
- Allegiance: United States of America
- Branch/service: United States Air Force
- Years of service: 2007–present
- Rank: Chief master sergeant

TikTok information
- Page: lifewithtiffanyz
- Followers: 75.1K
- Last updated: July 18, 2026

Tiffany Zaloudek is an American senior non-commissioned military officer and internet personality. She is a Survival, Evasion, Resistance and Escape specialist and the first woman SERE specialist to be promoted to the rank of chief master sergeant in the United States Air Force.

== Early life ==
Zaloudek is the oldest of four siblings and was raised in a family in St. Louis, Missouri. She played basketball and competed in track & field while enrolled at Veritas Christian Academy.

== Career ==
Zaloudek earned her beret as a Survival, Evasion, Resistance and Escape (SERE) specialist in 2007, the first woman to do so in an eight-year period. She was also the first woman in the Air Force SERE program to qualify as a military free fall jumpmaster and test parachutist. Zaloudek works for the Air Force as a Deputy SERE Career Field Program Manager.

On November 1, 2024, Zaloudek became the first woman SERE specialist to earn the rank of chief master sergeant in the United States Air Force.

Zaloudek has spoken out publicly about sexism she faced in her field, particularly as an SERE specialist.

=== Awards ===
On June 28, 2025, Zaloudek was presented with the Margaret Cochran Corbin Award for distinguished military service by President General Pamela Rouse Wright during National Defense Night at the 134th Continental Congress of the Daughters of the American Revolution at DAR Constitution Hall in Washington, D.C.

== Personal life ==
She is a Christian.
