= Silex, Missouri =

City in Missouri, US

Silex
- City
- Farmers Exchange Bank building in Silex
- Motto: A Rural City Moving Forward
- Location of Silex, Missouri
- Coordinates: 39°07′30.15″N 91°03′18.40″W
- Country: United States
- State: Missouri
- County: Lincoln
- Founded: 1880s
- Incorporated: 1886

Area
  - Total: 0.289 sq mi (0.749 km^{2})
  - Land: 0.288 sq mi (0.747 km^{2})
  - Water: 0.0015 sq mi (0.004 km^{2})
- Elevation: 509 ft (155 m)

Population (2020)
  - Total: 24
  - Estimate (2023): 264
  - Density: 915.5/sq mi (353.49/km^{2})
- Time zone: UTC–6 (Central (CST))
  - Summer (DST): UTC–5 (CDT)
- ZIP Code: 63377
- Area codes: 573 and 235
- FIPS code: 29-67808
- GNIS feature ID: 2399821
- Website: cityofsilex.gov

Silex is a 4th-class city in Lincoln County, Missouri, United States. The population was 24 at the 2020 census, According to 2023 census estimates, the city has a population of 264.

== History ==
Silex had its start in the 1880s when the Northern Hannibal Railway was extended to the town. A post office called Silex has been in operation since 1882.

Later, the town annexed a portion of Missouri Highway E towards U.S. Route 61 to Mo RA and plans to grow the town, while keeping a small-town feel. The city's administrator and Chief of Police William Barnes II gave the town its first city logo and slogan in early 2016. The City of Silex's slogan is "A rural City Moving Forward".

In 2015, Silex's mayor, David E. Rice, died in a traffic collision, at age 67.

On September 7, 2022, a plane crashed near Silex, leaving one injured.

Silex has struggled with its water infrastructure. In September 2023, the city's water was shut off due to a radium contamination. In December 2024, water was imported into the city, as residents struggled to get running water. In April 2026, the entirety of Silex nearly had its water shut off due to $20,000 in outstanding bills.

== Education ==
Silex R-1 School District serves students in Silex and surrounding communities. It was established in 1912. Silex has one high school, Silex High School.

== Geography ==
Silex is located at 39°07′30.15″N 91°03′18.40″W (39.1250413, -91.0551112).

According to the United States Census Bureau, the city has a total area of 0.289 square miles (0.75 km^{2}), of which 0.288 square miles (0.75 km^{2}) is land and 0.001 square miles (0.00 km^{2}) is water.

== Demographics ==
Historical population
Census	Pop.	Note	%±
1890	151		—
1900	210		39.1%
1910	276		31.4%
1920	267		−3.3%
1930	251		−6.0%
1940	240		−4.4%
1950	188		−21.7%
1960	176		−6.4%
1970	306		73.9%
1980	287		−6.2%
1990	197		−31.4%
2000	206		4.6%
2010	187		−9.2%
2020	24		−87.2%
2023 (est.)	264	▲	1,000.0%
U.S. Decennial Census; 2020 Census

=== 2020 census ===
As of the 2020 census, there were 24 people, 7 households, and 7 families residing in the city. There were 7 housing units.

=== 2010 census ===
As of the 2010 census, there were 187 people, 57 households, and 37 families residing in the village. The population density was 984.2 inhabitants per square mile (380.0/km^{2}). There were 84 housing units at an average density of 442.1 per square mile (170.7/km^{2}). The racial makeup of the village was 97.9% White and 2.1% African American.

There were 57 households, of which 29.8% had children under the age of 18 living with them, 36.8% were married couples living together, 21.1% had a female householder with no husband present, 7.0% had a male householder with no wife present, and 35.1% were non-families. 29.8% of all households were made up of individuals, and 8.8% had someone living alone who was 65 years of age or older. The average household size was 2.53 and the average family size was 3.16.

The median age in the city was 38.8 years. 22.5% of residents were under the age of 18; 10.1% were between the ages of 18 and 24; 21.4% were from 25 to 44; 33.7% were from 45 to 64; and 12.3% were 65 years of age or older. The gender makeup of the village was 51.9% male and 48.1% female.

=== 2000 census ===
As of the 2000 census, there were 206 people, 80 households, and 59 families residing in the village. The population density was 1,074.5 inhabitants per square mile (414.9/km^{2}). There were 91 housing units at an average density of 474.6 per square mile (183.2/km^{2}). The racial makeup of the village was 99.03% White, and 0.97% from two or more races.

There were 80 households, out of which 33.8% had children under the age of 18 living with them, 53.8% were married couples living together, 16.3% had a female householder with no husband present, and 26.3% were non-families. 21.3% of all households were made up of individuals, and 6.3% had someone living alone who was 65 years of age or older. The average household size was 2.58 and the average family size was 2.97.

In the city the population was spread out, with 26.2% under the age of 18, 8.7% from 18 to 24, 33.0% from 25 to 44, 18.4% from 45 to 64, and 13.6% who were 65 years of age or older. The median age was 37 years. For every 100 females there were 106.0 males. For every 100 females age 18 and over, there were 97.4 males.

The median income for a household in the city was $24,531, and the median income for a family was $33,125. Males had a median income of $30,313 versus $19,167 for females. The per capita income for the city was $12,529. About 11.3% of families and 12.5% of the population were below the poverty line, including 10.4% of those under the age of eighteen and none of those sixty-five or over.
