= Silex High School =

High school in Missouri, United States

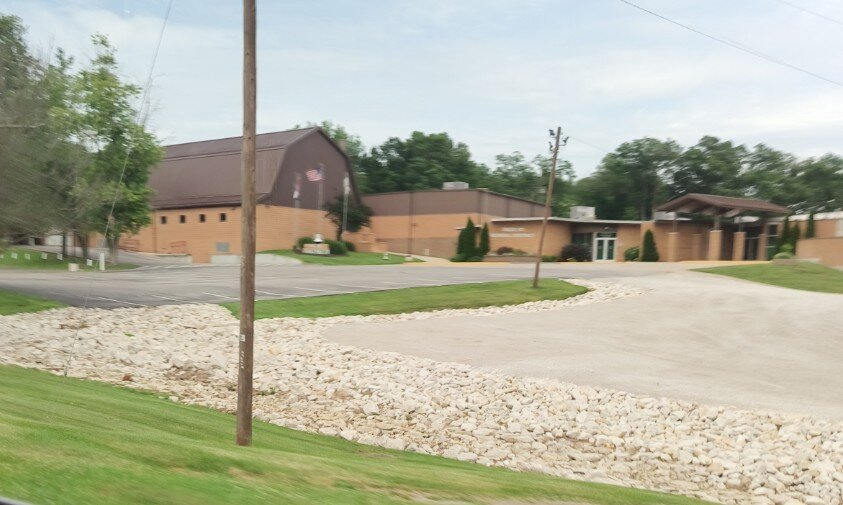

Location
- 64 Highway UU; Silex, Missouri 63377; United States; 39.126309°N 91.060700°W

Information
- Type: High school
- Established: 1912; 114 years ago
- School district: Silex R-1 School District
- Superintendent: Rod Hamlett
- Principal: Chris Gray
- Teaching staff: 18.93 (FTE)
- Grades: 7–12
- Enrollment: 258 (2023–24)
- Student to teacher ratio: 13.63
- Campus type: Rural
- Colors: Green and white
- Nickname: (Lady) Owls
- Website: silex.k12.mo.us

Silex High School is a high school serving Silex, Missouri and the surrounding area. It serves students from grades 7 to 12. It is the only high school in the Silex R-1 School District.

== Academics ==
Silex High is ranked 984th among Missouri high schools. 62% of students are proficient in reading and 42% are proficient in math. Silex has a 90% graduation rate.

== Athletics ==
Silex competes primarily in sports sponsored by the Missouri State High School Activities Association. The softball team won Class 1 state championships in 2006 and 2012, and the girls' basketball team were Class 1A state champions in 2001.

== Student life ==
More than 80% of Silex's students are involved in agricultural education, with widespread participation in the National FFA Organization.
