= California R-1 High School =

California High School

Location
- 1501 West Buchanan Street; California, Missouri 65018; United States; 38°38′05″N 92°35′36″W

Information
- School type: Public
- Motto: "Equipping today's children for tomorrow's challenges"
- Status: Open
- School district: California R-1 School District
- NCES District ID: 2906510
- Superintendent: Daniel Williams
- NCES School ID: 290651000168
- Principal: Cathy VerBerkmoes
- Teaching staff: 31.23 (on an FTE basis)
- Grades: 9–12
- Enrollment: 439 (2024–2025)
  - Grade 9: 126
  - Grade 10: 111
  - Grade 11: 95
  - Grade 12: 107
- Student to teacher ratio: 14.06
- Colors: Royal blue and scarlet red
- Athletics conference: Tri-County Conference
- Nickname: Pintos
- Rivals: Blair Oaks High School
- Yearbook: Cavalier
- Website: hs.californiak12.org

California High School is located at 1501 West Buchanan Street in California, Missouri. It is part of the California R-1 School District. According to the National Center for Education Statistics, current enrollment at the high school is 446 as of the 2023-24 school year. The school mascot is the Pintos, and the school yearbook is called the Cavalier.

== Academics ==
California High School students are required to successfully complete 24 credit hours to meet graduation requirements. In addition to the curriculum at California High School, students may enroll in correspondence courses through the University of Missouri and dual enrollment with area colleges and universities. Students may also enroll in dual-credit courses through State Fair Community College and Central Methodist University.

== Athletics ==
California High School is a member of the Missouri State High School Activities Association and the Tri-County Conference. California has enjoyed success in many areas of athletics at conference, district and state levels.

The following sports are offered at California High School:

- Boys' sports:
  - Baseball
  - Basketball
  - Cross country
  - Football
  - Golf
  - Track and field
  - Wrestling
- Girls' sports:
  - Basketball
  - Cross country
  - Golf
  - Soccer
  - Softball
  - Track and field
  - Volleyball
  - Wrestling

=== Football ===
The football team was the Class 3 State Champions in 1997 and finished second in the state in 1998 and 1999. California High School started football in 1959 and finished 9–1 in their first season. The football team has finished the regular season undefeated 10 times (1960, 1961, 1967, 1996, 1997, 1998, 1999, 2000, 2012, 2014). The team has claimed also 18 Tri-County Conference titles (1959, 1960, 1961, 1966, 1967, 1974, 1977, 1978, 1983, 1985, 1986, 1996, 1997, 1998, 1999, 2000, 2012, 2014). Missouri did not start playoffs for high school football until 1968 (unfortunately after California's dominance in the sport from 1959 to 1967). Since then, however, the California Pintos have advanced to the playoffs 17 times (1977, 1983, 1985, 1986, 1988, 1989, 1995, 1996, 1997, 1998, 1999, 2000, 2003, 2010, 2012, 2013, 2014). The Pintos have played in the Show-Me Bowl (state championship game) three times (1997, 1998, 1999) and they have been State Semifinalists in 2012, 2013, 2014; State Quarterfinalists in 1977, 1983, 1985, 1996; State Sectionalists in 1986, 1988, 1989, 1995, 2000, 2003; State Regionalists in 2010, and brought home 14 District Championships (1983, 1985, 1988, 1989, 1995, 1996, 1997, 1998, 1999, 2000, 2003, 2012, 2013, 2014).

=== Boys' cross country ===
The California Pintos boys' cross country team has made three appearances in the state meet (2012, 2016, 2017) and their most recent state meet has brought them the farthest with fifth place making school history with only two points away from receiving the fourth-place trophy. In the past five years, a California individual has made it to the state meet. Also (as of 2017), they have been conference champions two consecutive seasons and made second place districts trophy two consecutive seasons.

=== Boys' basketball ===
The California Pintos boys' basketball team has won numerous conference championships and tournament titles in their many years of basketball. In 1965, the team advanced to the Final Four with an undefeated record, but lost the Class M State Championship game to Buffalo, 65–49 and finished that year 29–1. The basketball Pintos have advanced to the state playoffs eight times (1954, 1965, 1970, 1974, 1988, 1989, 1990, 2012). One of the stars of the 1965 Final Four team, Jerry Wells, was head coach of the team during the 1988–89 season, where his son, Kevin Wells, led an outstanding team to an identical 29–1 record, but the team fell in the Class 2 Quarterfinals.

=== Girls' basketball ===
The Lady Pintos have enjoyed success since California High School started girls' basketball in the 1974–75 season. The girls' basketball team has been the Tri-County Conference Champions 17 times (1981–82, 1983–84, 1984–85, 1985–86, 1987–88, 1990–91, 1991–92, 1992–93, 2000–01, 2001–02, 2002–03, 2003–04, 2005–06, 2008–09, 2009–10, 2010–11, 2011–12). The Lady Pintos have been a force in the Tri-County Conference since the conference sanctioned girls' basketball as a sport in the 1977–78 season. From 1981 to 1994, California was 63–14 in conference games, claiming eight Tri-County Conference crowns, with just one losing record. From 2000 to present, the Lady Pintos are 55–5 in Tri-County Conference games and have been the conference champions nine of the last 12 seasons. The California Lady Pintos have won nine district titles (1982–83, 1990–91, 1992–93, 2003–04, 2004–2005, 2008–09, 2009–10, 2011–12, 2017–18) advancing to the playoffs all of those years. They have played in the Final Four three times, making the finals once in 2017. In 2004 the Lady Pintos finished third in Class 3, in 2009 they placed fourth in Class 3, and in 2017 they placed second in Class 3. The Lady Pintos were State Quarterfinalists in 1983, 2005, 2012, and 2017.

=== Boys' and girls' golf ===
The girls' golf team has claimed two individual state titles, with Abby Spieler winning the Class 1 girls' individual state title in 2003 and 2005. The girls' golf team also finished 5th in Class 1 in 2005 and 9th in 2003. The boys' golf team is a regular at the state championships since the late 1980s and consistently finishes in the top 10 in the state tournaments. In 2006, the team finished 3rd in Class 2. The boys have won numerous Tri-County Conference and District titles.

=== Other titles ===
California has won a state championship in Indoor Track and has won Tri-County Conference Titles in all sports that the conference sanctions. The girls' softball and volleyball teams enjoyed huge successes in the 1970s. The volleyball has also enjoyed successes in the early 1980s and in this decade, with a couple of state playoff appearances. The boys' and girls' track teams have both sent numerous athletes to the state championship meet.
