= Leopold R-3 School District =

School district in Missouri, U.S.

Address
- 100 Main St. - P.O. Box 39 Leopold, Missouri, 63760-0039; United States

District information
- Grades: K-12
- Superintendent: Matt Britt
- NCES District ID: 2918420

Students and staff
- Enrollment: 176 (2020-2021)
- Staff: 18.70 (on an FTE basis)
- Student–teacher ratio: 9.41
- District mascot: Wildcats
- Colors: Blue & White

Other information
- Website: www.leopold.k12.mo.us

The Leopold R-3 School District is a small, rural public school located in the unincorporated area of Leopold in Bollinger County in Southeast Missouri. With an average yearly enrollment of approximately 200 students in grades K-12, it is one of the smallest school districts in the state of Missouri.

== Composition ==
The district consists of one elementary school (Kindergarten-Grade 6) and one consolidated junior-senior high school (Grades 7–12).

The reorganized district includes residents from the small, neighboring unincorporated areas of Drum, Glennon, and Laflin.

== School district information ==
=== Academic accomplishments ===
- The Leopold R-III School District has been awarded the Distinction in Performance Award by the Missouri Department of Education for outstanding school performance during the past nine school years from 2001–2002 to the present 2009–2010 academic year. During three of these nine years, the school district received a perfect 100 points on its ratings.
- The Leopold R-III School District has been ranked among the "Top 10" small school districts in the state.
- The Southeast Missourian newspaper has chosen Leopold as the "Best Public School in Southeast Missouri" during the past four academic school years.
- On May 6, 2008, Leopold High School was awarded the "Gold Star Award" at a ceremony held in Jefferson City. Leopold was one of 15 schools in the state to receive this award based on the students performing in the top 10-percent of all schools on state assessments (MAP) and the school adequately meeting the yearly progress requirements.

== Demographics ==
During the 2008–2009 academic school year, the total enrollment was 208 in the school district – 100.00% White.

== Activities/clubs ==
- BETA Club
- Business Club
- Pep Club
- Science Fair Club
- LHS Concert Choir
- Student Activities Council

== Athletics/sports ==
Leopold is a member of the Missouri State High School Activities Association (MSHSAA) and offers the following sports:

- Boys' Basketball
- Girls' Volleyball
- Boys' Baseball
- Girls' Softball
- Girls' Cheerleading
- LHS Spirit Leaders
- Boys and Girls' Cross Country

=== Athletic accomplishments ===
The school has a reputation for its volleyball program with the varsity team posting 20 wins a season on average. The Leopold Lady Wildcats have dominated the Mississippi Valley Conference for the past eight years and has won their respected district title the past eight seasons as well. The Lady Wildcats won second place in their district during the 2000–01 and 2001–2002 seasons, losing to their county rival Meadow Heights. The Lady Wildcats are currently coached by Sandy Davis and Greg Nenninger.

- The Leopold Lady Wildcats varsity volleyball team has won the Class 1A State Volleyball Championship three times: 1993–94 (coached by Greg Nenninger), 1997–1998 and 2002–2003 (coached by Leanne Huffman). The Lady Wildcats won third place at the Class 1 State Volleyball Tournament during the 2007–08 season.

== School newspaper ==
Students in the school district do not actually publish their own school newspaper. Instead, students in publications class format Wildcat, a half-page section in The Banner Press, the county newspaper based in Marble Hill, published weekly.
