= Lone Jack High School =

Location
- 313 South Bynum Road; Lone Jack, Missouri 64070; United States; 38°51′48″N 94°10′21″W

Information
- School district: Lone Jack School District
- Superintendent: Kathy Butler
- Principal: Nathan Muckey
- Teaching staff: 31.40 (on an FTE basis)
- Grades: 6-12
- Enrollment: 400 (2024-2025)
- Student to teacher ratio: 12.74
- Colors: Royal blue and white
- Nickname: Mules
- Website: www.lonejackc6.net/page/high-school

Lone Jack High School is a high school in Lone Jack, Missouri. It is operated by Lone Jack School District. The principal is Kathy Butler.
