= Whitefield Academy (Missouri) =

Location
- 8929 Holmes Road; Kansas City, Missouri 64131; United States; 38°57′54″N 94°34′52″W

Information
- Type: Private, Christian, Classical, Day, College-prep
- Motto: Omnis Scientia Ad Dei Gloriam (All Knowledge to the Glory of God)
- Religious affiliation: Christian
- Established: 1995
- Teaching staff: 29.3 (on an FTE basis)
- Grades: PK-12
- Enrollment: 236 (2017-18)
- Student to teacher ratio: 7.5
- Athletics conference: Metro Christian Athletic Association
- Nickname: Lions
- Website: www.whitefieldacademykc.org

Whitefield Academy is a classical Christian school in Kansas City, Missouri, serving pre-kindergarten to 12th grade. The school seeks to train children to become compassionate leaders, critical thinkers and clear communicators. It is accredited by the Association of Classical Christian Schools.

== History ==
When Whitefield Academy opened its doors in the fall of 1995, 60 students were enrolled. The school initially leased space from Westbrooke Church, where several of the families involved were members. The next year, due to a growing enrollment, Whitefield Academy moved to Emmanuel Baptist Church. And in the third year, the academy divided its classes between the two churches to have sufficient space. In 2004, Whitefield Academy purchased its current building, a former church.

According to a 2021 article in The Pitch, three teachers left the school and refused to sign a letter supporting a policy to expel students who are gay. The school's headmaster denies the existence of the letter.

== Demographics ==
The demographic breakdown of the 280 Pre-K-12 students enrolled for school year 2021-2022 was:

- Asian - 9.6%
- Black - 9.7%
- Hispanic - 10.2&
- White - 67.4%
- Other - 3.1
