= Ashland, Missouri =

Ashland
- City
- City of Ashland
- Logo

- Location of Ashland, Missouri
- Coordinates: 38°46′20″N 92°15′53″W
- Country: United States
- State: Missouri
- County: Boone
- Founded: 1853
- Incorporated: May 17, 1877

Government
  - Mayor: Dorise Slinker
  - Administrator: Kyle Michel

Area
  - Total: 6.19 sq mi (16.02 km^{2})
  - Land: 6.18 sq mi (16.00 km^{2})
  - Water: 0.012 sq mi (0.03 km^{2})
- Elevation: 896 ft (273 m)

Population (2020)
  - Total: 4,747
  - Estimate (2023): 5,026
  - Density: 768.5/sq mi (296.73/km^{2})
- Time zone: UTC-6 (Central (CST))
  - Summer (DST): UTC-5 (CDT)
- ZIP code: 65010
- Area code: 573
- FIPS code: 29-02242
- GNIS feature ID: 2393998
- Website: ashlandmo.us

Ashland is a city in Boone County, Missouri, United States. Ashland is part of the Columbia, Missouri Metropolitan Statistical Area. The population was 4,747 at the 2020 census.

== History ==
Ashland was founded in 1853. It was named for the Ashland estate of Kentucky Congressman Henry Clay in Lexington, Kentucky. Clay was instrumental in the Missouri Compromise of 1820, which allowed Missouri's admission as the 24th state.

== Geography ==
According to the United States Census Bureau, the city has a total area of 4.80 square miles (12.43 km^{2}), of which, 4.79 square miles (12.41 km^{2}) is land and 0.01 square miles (0.03 km^{2}) is water.

== Demographics ==
Historical population
Census	Pop.	Note	%±
1880	371		—
1890	373		0.5%
1900	401		7.5%
1910	341		−15.0%
1920	342		0.3%
1930	314		−8.2%
1940	434		38.2%
1950	416		−4.1%
1960	495		19.0%
1970	769		55.4%
1980	1,021		32.8%
1990	1,252		22.6%
2000	1,869		49.3%
2010	3,707		98.3%
2020	4,747		28.1%
U.S. Decennial Census

=== 2020 census ===
As of the 2020 census, Ashland had a population of 4,747. The median age was 34.0 years. 30.2% of residents were under the age of 18 and 12.1% of residents were 65 years of age or older. For every 100 females there were 89.7 males, and for every 100 females age 18 and over there were 85.1 males age 18 and over.

0.0% of residents lived in urban areas, while 100.0% lived in rural areas.

There were 1,787 households in Ashland, of which 45.0% had children under the age of 18 living in them. Of all households, 53.3% were married-couple households, 12.9% were households with a male householder and no spouse or partner present, and 26.1% were households with a female householder and no spouse or partner present. About 23.5% of all households were made up of individuals and 9.5% had someone living alone who was 65 years of age or older.

There were 1,863 housing units, of which 4.1% were vacant. The homeowner vacancy rate was 0.9% and the rental vacancy rate was 6.9%.

Racial composition as of the 2020 census
Race	Number	Percent
White	4,342	91.5%
Black or African American	51	1.1%
American Indian and Alaska Native	24	0.5%
Asian	18	0.4%
Native Hawaiian and Other Pacific Islander	2	0.0%
Some other race	35	0.7%
Two or more races	275	5.8%
Hispanic or Latino (of any race)	93	2.0%

=== 2010 census ===
As of the census of 2010, there were 3,707 people, 1,428 households, and 990 families living in the city. The population density was 773.9 inhabitants per square mile (298.8/km^{2}). There were 1,530 housing units at an average density of 319.4 per square mile (123.3/km^{2}). The racial makeup of the city was 96.7% White, 0.8% African American, 0.3% Native American, 0.5% Asian, 0.4% from other races, and 1.3% from two or more races. Hispanic or Latino of any race were 1.5% of the population.

There were 1,428 households, of which 42.4% had children under the age of 18 living with them, 51.4% were married couples living together, 13.8% had a female householder with no husband present, 4.1% had a male householder with no wife present, and 30.7% were non-families. 25.8% of all households were made up of individuals, and 10.1% had someone living alone who was 65 years of age or older. The average household size was 2.54 and the average family size was 3.07.

The median age in the city was 33.9 years. 29.4% of residents were under the age of 18; 6.1% were between the ages of 18 and 24; 31.4% were from 25 to 44; 22% were from 45 to 64; and 11.3% were 65 years of age or older. The gender makeup of the city was 47.0% male and 53.0% female.

=== 2000 census ===
At the 2000 census, there were 1,869 people, 748 households and 495 families living in the city. The population density was 2,106.7 inhabitants per square mile (813.4/km^{2}). There were 820 housing units at an average density of 924.3 per square mile (356.9/km^{2}). The racial makeup of the city was 97.27% White, 0.43% African American, 0.43% Native American, 0.43% Asian, 0.80% from other races, and 0.64% from two or more races. Hispanic or Latino of any race were 1.34% of the population.

There were 748 households, of which 37.4% had children under the age of 18 living with them, 46.4% were married couples living together, 17.4% had a female householder with no husband present, and 33.7% were non-families. 27.0% of all households were made up of individuals, and 10.2% had someone living alone who was 65 years of age or older. The average household size was 2.37 and the average family size was 2.87.

27.2% of the population were under the age of 18, 8.3% from 18 to 24, 32.7% from 25 to 44, 16.3% from 45 to 64, and 15.5% who were 65 years of age or older. The median age was 33 years. For every 100 females, there were 82.5 males. For every 100 females age 18 and over, there were 79.8 males.

The median household income was $34,750 and the median family income was $41,136. Males had a median income of $28,203 versus $24,180 for females. The per capita income for the city was $15,938. About 8.9% of families and 10.3% of the population were below the poverty line, including 14.9% of those under age 18 and 9.4% of those age 65 or over.

== Education ==
Ashland is served by the Southern Boone County R-1 Public School District. The district's schools include:

- Southern Boone High School (Grades 9 through 12)
- Southern Boone County Middle School (Grades 5 through 8)
- Southern Boone County Elementary School (Grades 3 & 4)
- Southern Boone County Primary School (Pre-School through Second Grade and Parents As Teachers)

Southern Boone County R-1 Public School District enrollment doubled between 1991 and 2017.

Ashland has a public library, a branch of the Daniel Boone Regional Library.

== Notable people ==
- Dylan Frazier, 2024 top ranked men's double player in the Professional Pickleball Association
- Eva Johnston, academic at the University of Missouri
