= Veritas Christian Academy (Missouri) =

Christian High School

Location
- 1145 Tom Ginnever; O'Fallon, Missouri, Missouri; United States; 38°49′21″N 90°40′24″W

Information
- Type: Private
- Denomination: Christianity
- Founded: 1980; 46 years ago
- Grades: Preschool-12
- Houses: Aerie, Tower, Soar, Jubilee
- Colors: Teal, black, and white
- Mascot: Eagle
- Accreditation: Cognia
- Publication: Eagle Eye
- Yearbook: The Mission
- Website: veritaschristianacademy.com

Veritas Christian Academy, formerly Christian High School and the Christian School District, is a private Christian school in O'Fallon, Missouri, with over 660 students in grades preschool through 12. Veritas Christian Academy is accredited through the Association of Christian Schools International. The school mascot is the Eagle and the school colors are teal, black, and white.

== History ==
Living Word Christian School was founded as an elementary school in Saint Peters, Missouri in St. Charles County. In 1999, homebuilder T.R. Hughes donated 20 acres (81,000 m^{2}) of real estate to Living Word Christian School. With the help of donations, work was soon completed on the 60,000-square-foot (5,600 m^{2}) building.

In the mid- to late-2010s, Veritas Christian Academy began consolidating its elementary and secondary schools, ultimately relocating them to its main campus on Tom Ginnever Avenue. In 2019, Living Word Christian School rebranded itself as Christian School District. A few years later, in 2024, Christian School District rebranded as Veritas Christian Academy, intended to reflect its consolidation over the past decade.

In 2024, Veritas Christian Academy reported an annual enrollment of 149 students in grades 9-12.

== Controversy ==
In March 2021, white faculty members of Veritas Christian Academy, costumed as Scrabble tiles, spelled a racial slur and posted the photo online. Despite claims at the time by Principal Jake Ibbetson, The Independent confirmed parental reports that the image was also posted to the school's website. The drew condemnation from civil rights groups, including the St. Charles County and St. Louis County branches of the NAACP. Parents stated that at least one other race-related incident occurred the preceding fall semester. It was unclear if faculty faced disciplinary action related to the racial slur incident, and several students condemned perceived patterns of racial discrimination, unaccountability, and "empower[ing] racists."

Veritas Christian Academy is accredited through the Association of Christian Schools International, an organization founded in the late twentieth century as a reactionary response to increasing educational desegregation within the United States.

== Athletics and Extracurriculars ==
The Veritas Christian Academy high school is a member of the Missouri State High School Activities Association. In 2024, the high school of Veritas Christian Academy reported activities in baseball, basketball, cross country, dance, football, golf, soccer, softball, swimming, track and field, volleyball, and wrestling. The school has won multiple state tournaments with the most recently being in boys soccer in 2025.

The school has an active music program for grades 6-12 in addition to limited offerings in visual art and theater.

== Notable alumni ==
- Tiffany Zaloudek, military officer
