= Harrisburg, Missouri =

- Village
- Village of Harrisburg
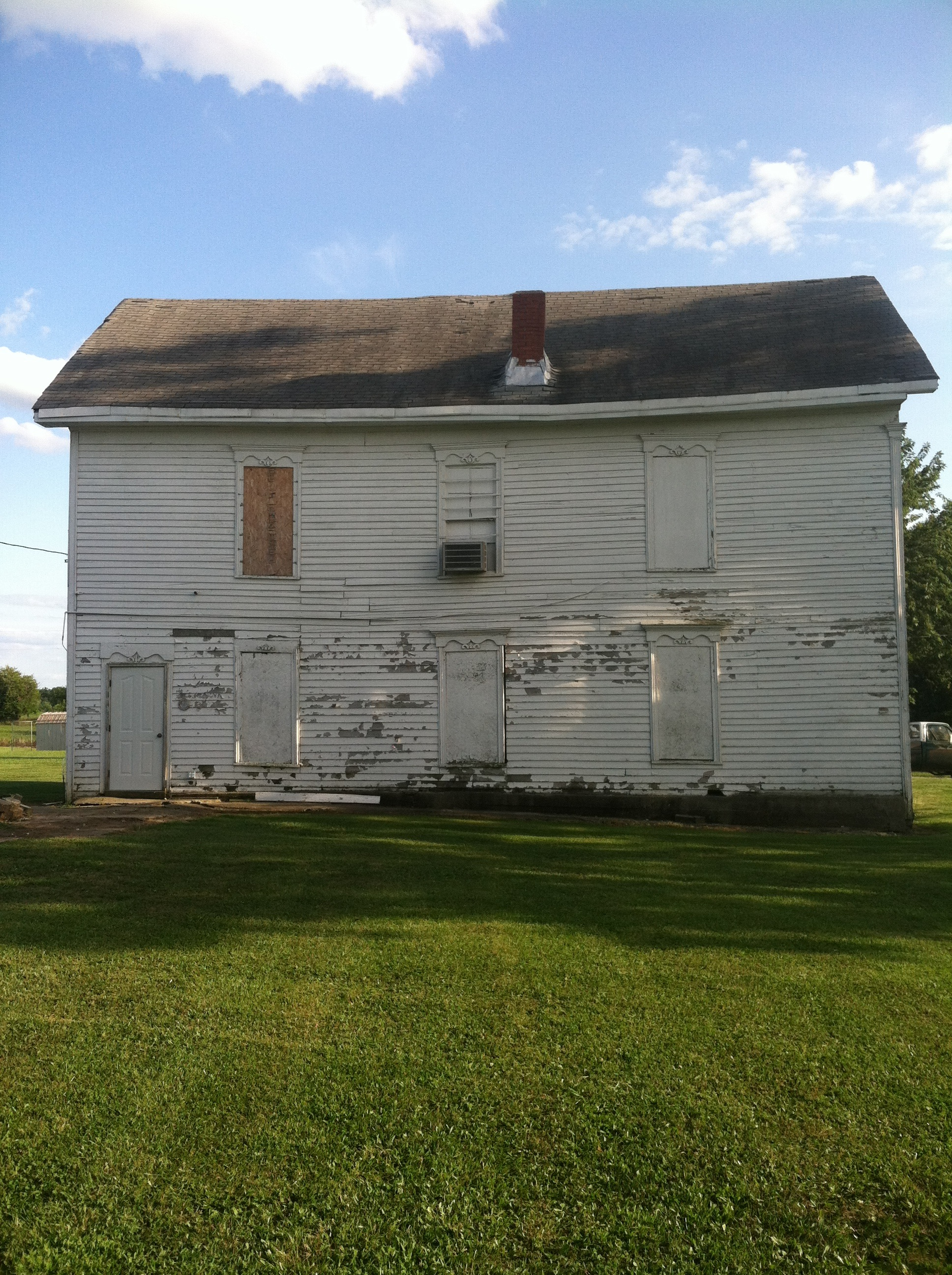
- North face of the Harrisburg school and masonic lodge

- Location of Harrisburg, Missouri
- Coordinates: 39°08′23″N 92°27′28″W
- Country: United States
- State: Missouri
- County: Boone

Area
  - Total: 0.80 sq mi (2.08 km^{2})
  - Land: 0.80 sq mi (2.06 km^{2})
  - Water: 0.0077 sq mi (0.02 km^{2})
- Elevation: 817 ft (249 m)

Population (2020)
  - Total: 271
  - Density: 340.3/sq mi (131.38/km^{2})
- Time zone: UTC-6 (Central (CST))
  - Summer (DST): UTC-5 (CDT)
- ZIP code: 65256
- Area code: 573
- FIPS code: 29-30484
- GNIS feature ID: 2396988

Harrisburg is a town in western Boone County, Missouri, United States. It is part of the Columbia, Missouri Metropolitan Statistical Area. The population was 266 at the 2010 census. It was founded to be an important railroad depot, but the railroad never came and the town remained small. Harrisburg is situated on a high point between Moniteau Creek and Perche Creek, at the headwaters of Callahan Creek. It is named in honor of John Woods Harris, an early county leader and owner of the nearby “Model Farm” on Thrall’s Prairie.

== History ==
Harrisburg was named for John W. Harris, who inherited the Model Farm on what was Thrall's Prairie, the first permanent settlement in the county. The town was laid out on the survey line of the prospective Louisiana and Missouri River Railroad which was later leased to Chicago and Alton Railroad. The line was graded and prepared, but was abandoned for a line farther north. The proposed line can be seen on the 1969 USGS topographic map of Harrisburg. According to Colonel W. F. Switzler, in 1882, there were a post office, three stores, a confectionary shop, a church, a mill, a blacksmith shop, and a public school building with the Masonic lodge above. That Harrisburg School building, constructed by the Freemasons, served as Harrisburg’s school and community center from 1878 to 1963. In 2013 it was placed on the National Register of Historic Places, but was shortly afterward demolished due to dilapidation. The small Prewitt Family Cemetery is located behind Harrisburg Elementary School. The much larger Harrisburg Cemetery is located at the East end of town. The earliest burial was in 1863, and burials continue today, with an estimated 750 interments as of 2024.The post office was located in the saddle shop. Reverend Green Carey preached at the Bethlehem Baptist church a few miles south of Harrisburg for fifty years and claimed to have joined more than five hundred couples in marriage.

The first church building in town belonged to the Harrisburg Christian congregation. It was built in 1872 of local stone and donated wood. In 1880, the official record counted sixty seven members. In 1980, the hundred-year-old building was demolished and a new building took its place. The Baptist church is a part of the Southern Baptist Convention. The old church building, built in 1887, is still in use. In 1961, the two congregations were regularly trading Sundays.

== Geography ==
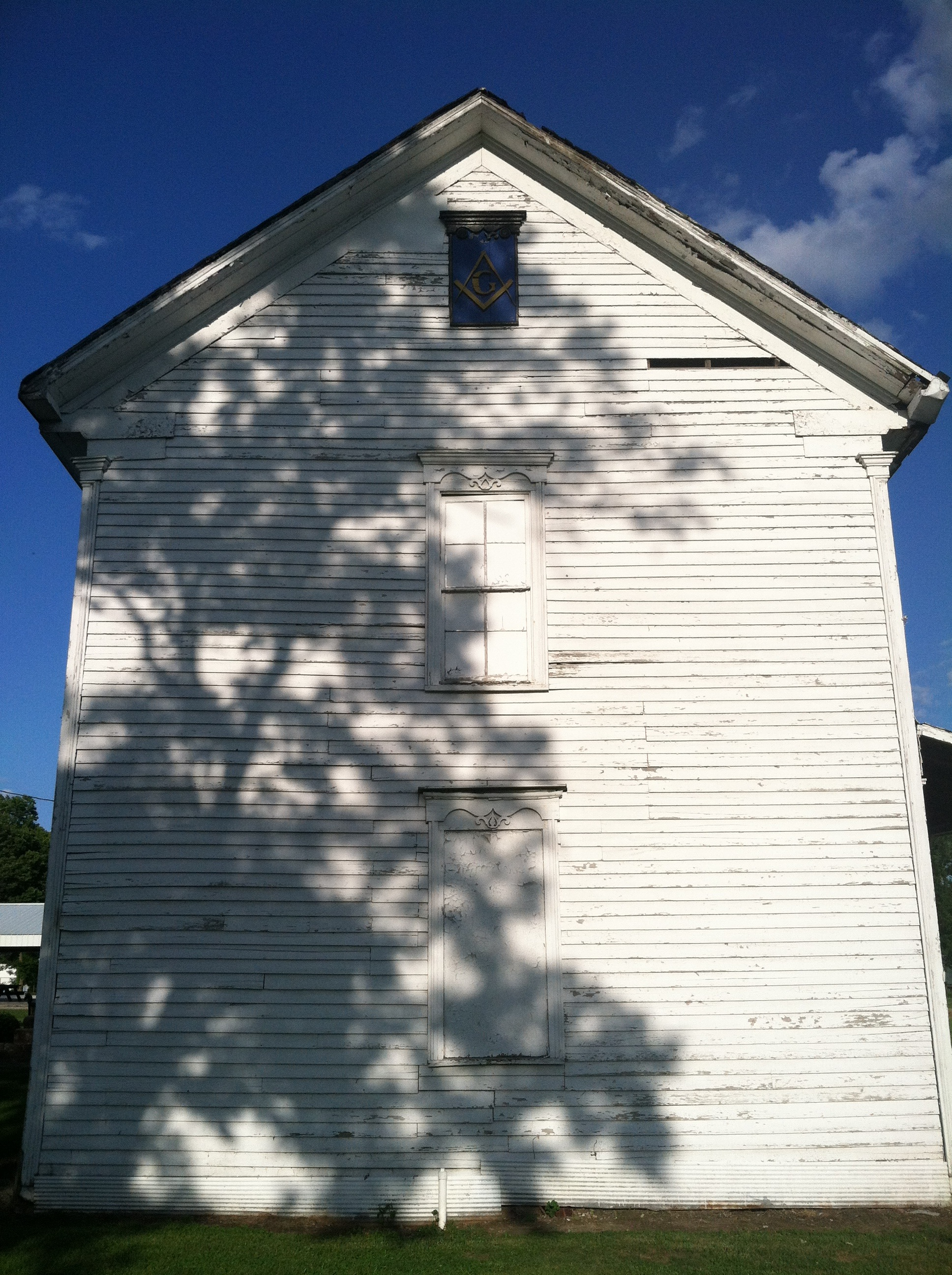
West face of the Harrisburg School and Ancient Landmark Masonic Lodge Number 356 A.F. & A.M.

Harrisburg is located on Missouri Route 124 about one mile from the Boone-Howard county line. Fayette is about eleven miles to the west and U.S. Route 63 is about seven miles to the east along route 124. Perche Creek flows past two miles east of the community.

According to the United States Census Bureau, the village has a total area of 0.76 square miles (1.97 km^{2}), of which 0.75 square miles (1.94 km^{2}) is land and 0.01 square miles (0.03 km^{2}) is water. The town is located between the Moniteau and Perche watersheds. The Prairie fork of the Moniteau heads towards Harrisburg, as does the Callaham fork of Perche Creek.

== Education ==
The Harrisburg R-VIII School District operates an elementary school, a middle school, and Harrisburg High School. Total enrollment in 2009 was 585. The high school in 2009 had a 93.3% graduation rate. In 2006 and 2008 the Harrisburg boys basketball team won the Missouri Class 2A state championship, then in 2010 and 2012 Harrisburg won the Missouri Class 2A girls basketball state championship.

== Demographics ==
Historical population
| Census | Pop. | Note | %± |
|---|---|---|---|
| 1880 | 88 | | — |
| 1890 | 135 | | 53.4% |
| 1910 | 146 | | — |
| 1920 | 168 | | 15.1% |
| 1930 | 116 | | −31.0% |
| 1940 | 108 | | −6.9% |
| 1950 | 117 | | 8.3% |
| 1960 | 124 | | 6.0% |
| 1970 | 150 | | 21.0% |
| 1980 | 283 | | 88.7% |
| 1990 | 169 | | −40.3% |
| 2000 | 184 | | 8.9% |
| 2010 | 266 | | 44.6% |
| 2020 | 271 | | 1.9% |

=== 2010 census ===
As of the census of 2010, there were 266 people, 101 households, and 74 families living in the village. The population density was 354.7 inhabitants per square mile (137.0/km^{2}). There were 121 housing units at an average density of 161.3 per square mile (62.3/km^{2}). The racial makeup of the village was 97.0% White, 0.4% African American, 0.4% Native American, and 2.3% from two or more races. Hispanic or Latino of any race were 0.4% of the population.

There were 101 households, of which 43.6% had children under the age of 18 living with them, 55.4% were married couples living together, 13.9% had a female householder with no husband present, 4.0% had a male householder with no wife present, and 26.7% were non-families. 25.7% of all households were made up of individuals, and 10.9% had someone living alone who was 65 years of age or older. The average household size was 2.63 and the average family size was 3.12.

The median age in the village was 29.8 years. 33.5% of residents were under the age of 18; 7.9% were between the ages of 18 and 24; 31.9% were from 25 to 44; 17.3% were from 45 to 64; and 9.4% were 65 years of age or older. The gender makeup of the village was 45.9% male and 54.1% female.

=== 2000 census ===
As of the census of 2000, there were 184 people, 77 households, and 50 families living in the town. The population density was 265.7 inhabitants per square mile (102.6/km^{2}). There were 86 housing units at an average density of 124.2 per square mile (48.0/km^{2}). The racial makeup of the town was 95.65% White, and 4.35% from two or more races.

There were 77 households, out of which 32.5% had children under the age of 18 living with them, 50.6% were married couples living together, 13.0% had a female householder with no husband present, and 33.8% were non-families. 31.2% of all households were made up of individuals, and 16.9% had someone living alone who was 65 years of age or older. The average household size was 2.39 and the average family size was 2.96.

In the town the population was spread out, with 25.5% under the age of 18, 10.3% from 18 to 24, 26.6% from 25 to 44, 22.8% from 45 to 64, and 14.7% who were 65 years of age or older. The median age was 36 years. For every 100 females, there were 95.7 males. For every 100 females age 18 and over, there were 80.3 males.

The median income for a household in the town was $40,714, and the median income for a family was $44,167. Males had a median income of $30,000 versus $24,375 for females. The per capita income for the town was $14,298. About 12.0% of families and 18.0% of the population were below the poverty line, including 28.8% of those under the age of eighteen and 25.0% of those 65 or over.

== Education ==
It is in the Harrisburg R-VIII School District.
