= Southern Boone High School =

Location
- Ashland, Missouri; United States; 38°46′43.71″N 92°15′40.97″W

Information
- Type: Public Secondary/High school
- School district: Southern Boone County R-1
- Director: Dale Van Deven
- Teaching staff: 38.08 (FTE)
- Grades: 9-12
- Enrollment: 544 (2023-2024)
- Student to teacher ratio: 14.29
- Colors: Red and black
- Team name: Eagles
- Website: www.sbschools.us/o/high

Southern Boone High School is a public secondary school in Ashland, Missouri. It is operated by the Southern Boone County R-1 School District and serves much of southern Boone County, Missouri. It borders the Columbia Public Schools District to the north.

In 2022, Southern Boone won the Missouri state class 4 high school baseball championship.
