= Harrisburg High School (Missouri) =

Location
- Harrisburg, Missouri; United States; 39°7′6.93″N 92°13′37.68″W

Information
- Type: Public Secondary/High school
- School district: Harrisburg R-VIII School District
- Director: Kyle Fisher
- Teaching staff: 16.70 (FTE)
- Grades: 9-12
- Enrollment: 179 (2023-2024)
- Student to teacher ratio: 10.72
- Colors: Red and white
- Nickname: Bulldogs
- Website: www.harrisburg.k12.mo.us/page/high-school

Harrisburg High School is a public secondary school in Harrisburg, Missouri. It is operated by the Harrisburg R-VIII School District and serves northwest Boone County, Missouri. It borders the Sturgeon and Columbia Public School Districts.
