= List of Missouri state high school football champions =

Missouri state high school football championships have been sanctioned by the Missouri State High School Activities Association since 1968.

There have been seven ties for state champion, all before 2002, when the organization changed its classification system and began to allow championship games to be decided in overtime. The number of overtimes in a game is indicated by asterisks.

== Championships ==
Year	Class	Champion (record)	Score	Runner-up	Site
1968	1A	Princeton (11–0–1)	32–0	Cass-Midway	Raytown High School, Raytown
1968	2A	Cabool (10–1)	6–0	Seneca	John F. Kennedy Stadium, Springfield
1968	3A	Perryville (11–1)	14–0	Marshall	University City High School, University City
1968	4A	McCluer (10–0–1)	17–13	Oak Park	Faurot Field, University of Missouri, Columbia
1969	1A	Cass-Midway (10–1)	24–0	Smithville	Raytown High School, Raytown
1969	2A	Aurora (11–1)	13–6	Malden	Poplar Bluff High School, Poplar Bluff
1969	3A	DeLaSalle (Kansas City) (10–2)	14–8	Mercy (St. Louis)	Missouri Valley College, Marshall
1969	4A	McCluer (10–1)	21–0	Rockhurst	Faurot Field
1970	1A	Cass-Midway (12–0)	20–0	Rock Port	Bearcat Stadium, Northwest Missouri State University, Maryville
1970	2A	South Shelby (12–0)	38–18	Harrisonville	University of Central Missouri, Warrensburg
1970	3A	Chillicothe (11–0)	32–6	Dexter	Chillicothe High School, Chillicothe
1970	4A	St. Louis Univ. High (11–1)	28–19	Center (Kansas City)	Faurot Field
1971	1A	Tarkio (10–0)	35–22	Greenwood South	Bearcat Stadium
1971	2A	Monett (12–0)	37–8	Shelby	Plaster Sports Complex, Springfield
1971	3A	Richmond (11–1)	29–25	Fulton	Fulton High School, Fulton
1971	4A	Rockhurst (11–0)	14–10	Beaumont	William Chrisman High School, Independence
1972	1A	University High (Warrensburg) (12–0)	17–0	Fairfax	University of Central Missouri, Warrensburg
1972	2A	St. Mary's (Independence) (11–0)	6–0	Country Day (MICDS)	Ladue Horton Watkins High, Ladue
1972	3A	Chillicothe (10–1)	14–9	Chaminade	Chillicothe High School, Chillicothe
1972	4A	Hazelwood (9–1–1) /Southwest (KC) (9–0–2)	6–6 (tie)	(co-champions)	Francis Olympic Field, Washington University in St. Louis
1973	1A	North Shelby (11–0)	28–20	Drexel	South Shelby High School, Shelbina
1973	2A	Priory (9–1)	60–26	West Platte	Arrowhead Stadium, Kansas City
1973	3A	Washington (11–0)	14–7	Helias	University of Missouri–Rolla, Rolla
1973	4A	Sumner (11–1)	12–7	Rockhurst	Arrowhead Stadium
1974	1A	Lockwood (10–2)	34–0	King City	Bearcat Stadium
1974	2A	Country Day (MICDS) (10–1)	34–7	Pleasant Hill	St. Louis Country Day School
1974	3A	Boonville (11–0)	34–14	Washington	St. Louis University of Missouri–Rolla, Rolla
1974	4A	Hickman (10–1)	54–6	Sumner	Faurot Field
1975	1A	Orrick (11–1)	18–0	Greenfield	Excelsior Springs High, Excelsior Springs
1975	2A	John Burroughs (12–0)	28–26	Seneca	John Burroughs School, St. Louis
1975	3A	Rock Bridge (12–0)	10–0	Nevada	Faurot Field
1975	4A	Parkwood (Joplin) (12–0–1)	16–8	De Smet	Hughes Stadium, MSSC, Joplin
1976	1A	Cass-Midway (13–0)	21-14	Princeton	Cass-Midway High School, Cleveland
1976	2A	Lexington (12–0)	19–7	John Burroughs	John Burroughs School, St. Louis
1976	3A	Memorial (Joplin) (12–1)	31–0	Sullivan	Hughes Stadium, MSSC, Joplin
1976	4A	Jefferson City (13–0)	33–6	Sumner	Moss Field, Webster Groves H.S. St. Louis
1977	1A	Greenfield (12–0)	20–6	King City	King City High School, King City
1977	2A	Monett (11–2)	21–19	Louisiana	Burl Fowler Stadium, Monett, Missouri
1977	3A	Rock Bridge (10–0–2)	7–6	Camdenton	Faurot Field
1977	4A	Jefferson City (13–0)	20–11	Hazelwood Central	Jefferson City High School, Jefferson City
1978	1A	Cass-Midway (12–1)	13–0	Princeton	Cass-Midway High School, Cleveland
1978	2A	Mount Vernon (13–0)	37–21	Country Day (MICDS)	St. Louis Country Day School, St. Louis
1978	3A	Chillicothe (12–0)	42–0	Washington	Chillicothe High School, Chillicothe
1978	4A	Jefferson City (11–1)	35–21	Hazelwood Central	Lindenwood University, St. Charles
1979	1A	Jasper (12–1)	23–0	Hardin-Central	Busch Memorial Stadium
1979	2A	Plattsburg (12–0)	12–7	Marceline	Busch Memorial Stadium
1979	3A	Country Day (MICDS) (11–1)	14–7	St. Pius X (Kansas City)	Busch Memorial Stadium
1979	4A	Webster Groves (11–1)	7–6	Jefferson City	Busch Memorial Stadium
1980	1A	Hardin-Central (11–0)	14–6	Greenwood	Busch Memorial Stadium
1980	2A	John Burroughs (11–2–1) /Lexington (12–0–1)	6–6 (tie)	(co-champions)	Busch Memorial Stadium
1980	3A	O'Hara (11–3)	30–0	Caruthersville	Busch Memorial Stadium
1980	4A	Parkwood (Joplin) (14–0)	20–13	Hazelwood Central	Busch Memorial Stadium
1981	1A	Greenwood (10–1)	14–0	Gallatin	Busch Memorial Stadium
1981	2A	Valle Catholic (12–0–1) /St. Pius X (Kansas City) (12–0–1)	0–0 (tie)	(co-champions)	Busch Memorial Stadium
1981	3A	Lutheran North (12–1)	14–6	Marshall	Busch Memorial Stadium
1981	4A	Rockhurst (12–1)	35–14	Hazelwood Central	Busch Memorial Stadium
1982	1A	Cass-Midway (12–0)	42–6	Gallatin	Arrowhead Stadium
1982	2A	Valle Catholic (14–0)	37–0	Mt. Vernon	Arrowhead Stadium
1982	3A	Maryville (12–1)	22–0	Duchesne	Arrowhead Stadium
1982	4A	St. Charles (13–1)	10–3	O'Hara	Arrowhead Stadium
1982	5A	Sumner (11–2)	32–22	Rockhurst	Arrowhead Stadium
1983	1A	Chaffee (11–2)	13–7	Norborne	Busch Memorial Stadium
1983	2A	Valle Catholic (13–1)	14–7	Seneca	Busch Memorial Stadium
1983	3A	Country Day (MICDS) (12–1)	14–0	Harrisonville	Busch Memorial Stadium
1983	4A	Parkwood (Joplin) (14–0)	35–7	Union	Busch Memorial Stadium
1983	5A	Rockhurst (12–2)	13–7	Hazelwood Central	Busch Memorial Stadium
1984	1A	Rock Port (12–0)	7–6	Appleton City	Arrowhead Stadium
1984	2A	Knob Noster (12–1)	8–7	Hayti	Arrowhead Stadium
1984	3A	Lexington (12–1)	28–0	Berkeley	Arrowhead Stadium
1984	4A	Helias (12–2)	23–13	Parkwood (Joplin)	Arrowhead Stadium
1984	5A	Jefferson City (12–2)	21–12	Sumner	Arrowhead Stadium
1985	1A	Rock Port (13–0)	13–12	Sweet Springs	Busch Memorial Stadium
1985	2A	John Burroughs (9–4)	35–8	Plattsburg	Busch Memorial Stadium
1985	3A	Country Day (MICDS) (12–1)	28–0	Pembroke Hill	Busch Memorial Stadium
1985	4A	Chillicothe (13–1)	20–14	Center (Kansas City)	Busch Memorial Stadium
1985	5A	Hazelwood Central (14–0)	22–15	Lee's Summit	Busch Memorial Stadium
1986	1A	Marceline (13–0)	20–0	Greenwood	Arrowhead Stadium
1986	2A	Louisiana (13–1)	23–14	Seneca	Arrowhead Stadium
1986	3A	Country Day (MICDS) (13–0)	31–7	Oak Grove	Arrowhead Stadium
1986	4A	Camdenton (12–0–1) /Marshall (12–0–1)	20–20 (tie)	(co-champions)	Arrowhead Stadium
1986	5A	Rockhurst (11–1)	13–10	Hazelwood Central	Arrowhead Stadium
1987	1A	Hardin-Central (12–0)	18–6	Adrian	William Jewell College, Liberty
1987	2A	Seneca (14–0)	20–13	Brentwood	Faurot Field
1987	3A	Berkeley (13–1)	35–8	Branson	Faurot Field
1987	4A	Camdenton (12–0)	23–14	Sumner	Faurot Field
1987	5A	Rockhurst (12–1)	7–0	Hazelwood Central	Faurot Field
1988	8-Man	South Holt (10–1)	46–0	Miami	Bearcat Stadium
1988	1A	Valle Catholic (12–1)	21–3	Rock Port	Faurot Field
1988	2A	Lexington (13–1)	17–14	John Burroughs	Plaster Sports Complex
1988	3A	Lutheran North (13–1)	36–0	Chillicothe	Faurot Field
1988	4A	Webster Groves (10–3)	26–6	Center (Kansas City)	Faurot Field
1988	5A	Jefferson City (11–0)	53–0	McCluer North	Faurot Field
1989	8-Man	North Nodaway (11–1)	46–0	DeKalb	Bearcat Stadium
1989	1A	Valle Catholic (12–1)	49–7	Marceline	Faurot Field
1989	2A	John Burroughs (10–3)	17–6	Putnam County	Faurot Field
1989	3A	Lutheran North (13–1)	28–26	Branson	Plaster Sports Complex
1989	4A	Webb City (14–0)	16–0	Sumner	Plaster Sports Complex
1989	5A	Hazelwood East (14–0)	28–14	Rockhurst	Faurot Field
1990	8-Man	Nodaway-Holt (11–0)	49–12	Southwest (Ludlow)	Bearcat Stadium
1990	1A	Valle Catholic (13–1)	49–21	Rock Port	Plaster Sports Complex
1990	2A	Warsaw (13–1)	42–7	South Shelby	Plaster Sports Complex
1990	3A	Lutheran North (13–1)	37–13	Oak Grove	Faurot Field
1990	4A	Sumner (13–1)	36–21	Webb City	Faurot Field
1990	5A	Jefferson City (14–0)	12–7	McCluer	Faurot Field
1991	8-Man	Nodaway-Holt (11–0)	27–14	South Nodaway	Bearcat Stadium
1991	1A	Valle Catholic (14–0)	28–24	Tarkio	Faurot Field
1991	2A	John Burroughs (11–2)	21–7	Pembroke Hill	Faurot Field
1991	3A	Chillicothe (12–2)	40–12	Herculaneum	Plaster Sports Complex
1991	4A	Sumner (11–1)	52–8	Benton (St. Joseph)	Plaster Sports Complex
1991	5A	Jefferson City (11–2)	10–7	St. Louis Univ. High	Faurot Field
1992	8-Man	South Holt (10–1–1)/South Nodaway (9–1–1)	20–20 (tie)	(co-champions)	Bearcat Stadium
1992	1A	Valle Catholic (14–0)	44–16	Hardin-Central	Plaster Sports Complex
1992	2A	John Burroughs (12–1)	21–7	Plattsburg	Plaster Sports Complex
1992	3A	Ste. Genevieve (13–1)	22–15	Bolivar	Faurot Field
1992	4A	Webb City (12–2)	24–21	Rock Bridge	Faurot Field
1992	5A	Blue Springs (13–1)	39–35	Parkway Central	Faurot Field
1993	8-Man	North Andrew (7–3–1)/ South Holt (10–1–1)	30–30 (tie)	(co-champions)	Bearcat Stadium
1993	1A	Milan (13–1)	19–12	Valle Catholic	Faurot Field
1993	2A	Warsaw (14–0)	13–12	Lutheran North	Faurot Field
1993	3A	St. Francis Borgia (14–0)	24–21	Chillicothe	Plaster Sports Complex
1993	4A	Webb City (14–0)	20–7	Rock Bridge	Plaster Sports Complex
1993	5A	Jefferson City (13–0)	35–0	McCluer North	Faurot Field
1994	8-Man	Fairfax (11–0)	40–14	North Andrew	Bearcat Stadium
1994	1A	Miller (12–1)	20–0	Tarkio	Plaster Sports Complex
1994	2A	Monroe City (14–0)	18–13	Warsaw	Plaster Sports Complex
1994	3A	Odessa (14–0)	28–0	Knob Noster	Faurot Field
1994	4A	Excelsior Springs (13–1)	12–6	Jackson	Faurot Field
1994	5A	Jefferson City (13–0)	14–7	Mehlville	Faurot Field
1995	8-Man	Worth County (12–0)	48–26	North Andrew	Bearcat Stadium
1995	1A	Valle Catholic (12–1)	63–13	Wellington-Napoleon	Hughes Stadium, MSSC, Joplin
1995	2A	John Burroughs (8–4–1) /Lexington (12–1–1)	14–14 (tie)	(co-champions)	Hughes Stadium, MSSC, Joplin
1995	3A	Seneca (14–0)	35–14	Herculaneum	Plaster Sports Complex
1995	4A	Camdenton (13–1)	20–19	Jackson	Plaster Sports Complex
1995	5A	Hazelwood East (14–0)	42–3	Blue Springs South	Plaster Sports Complex
1996	8-Man	North Andrew (11–0)	44–18	Fairfax	Kyle Field, Tarkio Academy, Tarkio
1996	1A	Cass-Midway (13–1)	42–13	Santa Fe	Trans World Dome, St. Louis
1996	2A	Monroe City (13–1)	21–0	Springfield Catholic	Trans World Dome
1996	3A	MICDS (13–0)	44–14	Maryville	Trans World Dome
1996	4A	Excelsior Springs (13–1)	36–15	Camdenton	Trans World Dome
1996	5A	Hazelwood Central (13–1)	21–20	Oak Park	Trans World Dome
1997	8-Man	North Andrew (11–1)	46–0	South Holt	Kyle Field, Tarkio Academy, Tarkio
1997	1A	Salisbury (14–0)	22–20	Marionville	Trans World Dome
1997	2A	Springfield Catholic (14–0)	28–0	Monroe City	Trans World Dome
1997	3A	California (14–0)	36–19	MICDS	Trans World Dome
1997	4A	Webb City (14–0)	44–14	North County (Bonne Terre)	Trans World Dome
1997	5A	Jefferson City (12–1)	23–19	Parkway Central	Trans World Dome
1998	8-Man	Worth County (12–0)	58–16	DeKalb	Spratt Stadium, Missouri Western, St. Joseph
1998	1A	North Platte (12–2)	30–7	St. Vincent	Trans World Dome
1998	2A	St. Pius X (Kansas City) (12–2)	14–0	Monroe City	Trans World Dome
1998	3A	Boonville (13–1)	33–22	California	Trans World Dome
1998	4A	Helias (12–2)	37–12	Ozark	Trans World Dome
1998	5A	Riverview Gardens (13–1)	41–34	Jefferson City	Trans World Dome
1999	8-man	Mound City (11–1)	62–60	North Andrew	Spratt Stadium
1999	1A	Rich Hill (14–0)	15–7	Santa Fe	Trans World Dome
1999	2A	Lutheran North (12–2)	28–21	St. Pius X (Kansas City)	Trans World Dome
1999	3A	Aurora (14–0)	7–0	California	Trans World Dome
1999	4A	Camdenton (14–0)	15–14	Helias	Trans World Dome
1999	5A	Mehlville (13–1)	15–7	Rockhurst	Trans World Dome
2000	8-man	Worth County (12–0)	44–14	Mound City	Spratt Stadium
2000	1A	Santa Fe (14–0)	12–0	St. Vincent	Trans World Dome
2000	2A	St. Pius X (Kansas City) (12–1)	34–21	Palmyra	Trans World Dome
2000	3A	Platte County (14–0)	32–9	Salem	Trans World Dome
2000	4A	Webb City (14–0)	41–0	McCluer North	Trans World Dome
2000	5A	Rockhurst (14–0)	23–7	Pattonville	Trans World Dome
2001	8-man	Worth County (12–0)	48–40	Miami	Dome at America's Center
2001	1A	West Platte (12–2)	20–13	Lockwood	Dome at America's Center
2001	2A	John Burroughs (13–0)	36–32	Warsaw	Dome at America's Center
2001	3A	Platte County (14–0)	21–14	Central (New Madrid County)	Dome at America's Center
2001	4A	Webb City (14–0)	45–0	Washington	Dome at America's Center
2001	5A	Blue Springs (14–0)	28–12	Hazelwood East	Dome at America's Center
2002	8-man	DeKalb (11–1)	30–26	King City	Spratt Stadium
2002	1	Adrian (13–1)	35–22	Hayti	Edward Jones Dome
2002	2	St. Pius X (Kansas City) (11–3)	28–6	Centralia	Edward Jones Dome
2002	3	Platte County (14–0)	34–13	Salem	Edward Jones Dome
2002	4	Kearney (13–1)	36–22	Eureka	Edward Jones Dome
2002	5	Webster Groves (10–3)	23–22	Raymore–Peculiar	Edward Jones Dome
2002	6	Rockhurst (13–0)	41–7	Lindbergh	Edward Jones Dome
2003	8-man	Mound City (11–0)	64–16	North Andrew	Spratt Stadium
2003	1	Marionville (14–0)	19–0	Princeton	Edward Jones Dome
2003	2	Centralia (14–0)	42–9	Lawson	Edward Jones Dome
2003	3	Harrisonville (14–0)	35–0	Ste. Genevieve	Edward Jones Dome
2003	4	Kearney (14–0)	43–0	Ladue Horton Watkins	Edward Jones Dome
2003	5	Park Hill (12–1)	34–20	Webster Groves	Edward Jones Dome
2003	6	Blue Springs (13–0)	53–0	Hazelwood Central	Edward Jones Dome
2004	8-man	South Holt (11–1)	66–48	St. Joseph Christian	Spratt Stadium
2004	1	St. Vincent (13–1)	21–0	East Buchanan	Edward Jones Dome
2004	2	Blair Oaks (14–0)	27–26	Cameron	Edward Jones Dome
2004	3	MICDS (14–0)	45–42**	Harrisonville	Edward Jones Dome
2004	4	Clayton (13–1)	27–26*	Webb City	Edward Jones Dome
2004	5	Raymore–Peculiar (13–0)	37–18	McCluer North	Edward Jones Dome
2004	6	Hickman (11–1)	34–7	Hazelwood East	Edward Jones Dome
2005	8-man	Mound City (11–1)	42–0	Worth County	Spratt Stadium
2005	1	West Platte (13–1)	35–28	Marionville	Edward Jones Dome
2005	2	Cameron (14–0)	64–18	Montgomery County	Edward Jones Dome
2005	3	Harrisonville (13–1)	42–0	MICDS	Edward Jones Dome
2005	4	Camdenton (14–0)	36–19	Affton	Edward Jones Dome
2005	5	Raymore–Peculiar (13–0)	43–21	McCluer North	Edward Jones Dome
2005	6	De Smet (11–2)	48–31	Hazelwood Central	Edward Jones Dome
2006	8-man	St. Joseph Christian (10–2)	62–26	Worth County	Spratt Stadium
2006	1	South Shelby (13–1)	34–27*	Marionville	Edward Jones Dome
2006	2	Blair Oaks (13–1)	32–24	Hogan Prep Charter	Edward Jones Dome
2006	3	Harrisonville (14–0)	56–21	Owensville	Edward Jones Dome
2006	4	Webb City (14–0)	26–0	Hannibal	Edward Jones Dome
2006	5	Raymore–Peculiar (10–3)	42–32	Kirkwood	Edward Jones Dome
2006	6	Blue Springs South (13–0)	41–7	Christian Brothers	Edward Jones Dome
2007	8-man	Worth County (12–0)	70–6	Hardin-Central	Spratt Stadium
2007	1	Orrick (14–0)	20–8	Thayer	Edward Jones Dome
2007	2	Lawson	38–17	Blair Oaks	Edward Jones Dome
2007	3	Harrisonville	49–14	MICDS	Edward Jones Dome
2007	4	Lee's Summit West	35–0	Parkway Central	Edward Jones Dome
2007	5	Waynesville	17–7	Belton	Edward Jones Dome
2007	6	Rockhurst	28–9	Mehlville	Edward Jones Dome
2008	8-man	Mound City (13–0)	48–16	St. Joseph Christian	Edward Jones Dome
2008	1	Orrick (15–0)	34–28**	Thayer	Edward Jones Dome
2008	2	Clark County	10–7	Maryville	Edward Jones Dome
2008	3	Cassville	31–6	Cardinal Ritter	Edward Jones Dome
2008	4	Webb City	41–34	Helias	Edward Jones Dome
2008	5	Hazelwood East	39–34	Raytown South	Edward Jones Dome
2008	6	Hazelwood Central	25–20	Blue Springs South	Edward Jones Dome
2009	8-man	Mound City (11–1)	50–8	St. Joseph Christian	Edward Jones Dome
2009	1	Penney (14–0)	21–17	Valle Catholic	Edward Jones Dome
2009	2	Maryville (14–1)	35–0	Brentwood	Edward Jones Dome
2009	3	Cassville (14–1)	24–7	Bowling Green	Edward Jones Dome
2009	4	Kearney (13–2)	27–15	Helias	Edward Jones Dome
2009	5	Webster Groves (13–0)	31–14	Fort Osage	Edward Jones Dome
2009	6	Hazelwood Central (13–1)	35–24	Blue Springs	Edward Jones Dome
2010	8-man	Mound City (12–1)	46–24	St. Joseph Christian	Edward Jones Dome
2010	1	Valle Catholic (15–0)	22–21*	Westran	Edward Jones Dome
2010	2	Penney (15–0)	34–13	Maplewood Richmond Heights	Edward Jones Dome
2010	3	Richmond (15–0)	21–20	John Burroughs	Edward Jones Dome
2010	4	Webb City (15–0)	56–7	Warrenton	Edward Jones Dome
2010	5	Lee's Summit West (14–1)	44–21	Webster Groves	Edward Jones Dome
2010	6	Rockhurst (14–0)	10–7	Hazelwood Central	Edward Jones Dome
2011	8-man	Worth County/Northeast Nodaway (13–0)	50–20	Mound City	Edward Jones Dome
2011	1	Valle Catholic (14–1)	49–7	South Shelby	Edward Jones Dome
2011	2	Lamar (14–1)	49–19	Lafayette County	Edward Jones Dome
2011	3	Logan-Rogersville (14–1)	21–14	John Burroughs	Edward Jones Dome
2011	4	Webb City (15–0)	56–42	MICDS	Edward Jones Dome
2011	5	Staley (14–0)	35–21	Kirkwood	Edward Jones Dome
2011	6	Blue Springs South (14–0)	40–37	Christian Brothers	Edward Jones Dome
2012	8-man	Stanberry (12–1)	56–38	North Andrew	Edward Jones Dome
2012	1	Penney (15–0)	60–34	Valle Catholic	Edward Jones Dome
2012	2	Lamar (13–2)	69–41	Blair Oaks	Edward Jones Dome
2012	3	Maryville(15–0)	35–22	John Burroughs	Edward Jones Dome
2012	4	Webb City (15–0)	49–14	Helias	Edward Jones Dome
2012	5	Kirkwood (13–0)	31–7	Fort Osage	Edward Jones Dome
2012	6	Blue Springs (13–1)	42–3	Francis Howell	Edward Jones Dome
2013	8-man	North Andrew (12–0)	16–13	Stanberry	Edward Jones Dome
2013	1	Valle Catholic (15–0)	41–0	Marceline	Edward Jones Dome
2013	2	Lamar (14–1)	42–0	Lawson	Edward Jones Dome
2013	3	Maryville (15–0)	50–28	Seneca	Edward Jones Dome
2013	4	Webb City (14–1)	28–14	Helias	Edward Jones Dome
2013	5	Lee's Summit West (13–1)	51–14	Parkway Central	Edward Jones Dome
2013	6	Blue Springs (14–0)	35–14	Columbia-Rock Bridge	Edward Jones Dome
2014	8-man	North Andrew (12–1)	48–36	Stanberry	Edward Jones Dome
2014	1	Valle Catholic (15–0)	49–25	Westran	Edward Jones Dome
2014	2	Lamar (14–1)	30–15	South Callaway	Edward Jones Dome
2014	3	Oak Grove (13–2)	49–27	John Burroughs	Edward Jones Dome
2014	4	Webb City (15–0)	48–21	Cape Girardeau Central	Edward Jones Dome
2014	5	Battle (11–4)	25–22	Nixa	Edward Jones Dome
2014	6	Christian Brothers (14–0)	31–24	Rockhurst	Edward Jones Dome
2015	8-man	Stanberry (13–0)	46–42	North Andrew	Edward Jones Dome
2015	1	Valle Catholic (15–0)	61–36	Penney	Edward Jones Dome
2015	2	Lamar (15–0)	37–0	Malden	Edward Jones Dome
2015	3	John Burroughs (14–1)	30–6	Odessa	Edward Jones Dome
2015	4	Kearney (14–1)	17–14	Webb City	Edward Jones Dome
2015	5	Fort Osage (14–1)	63–28	Chaminade	Edward Jones Dome
2015	6	Blue Springs South (15–0)	37–28	Christian Brothers College	Edward Jones Dome
2016	8-Man	North Andrew	50–22	Stanberry	Faurot Field
2016	1	Penney	47–14	Monroe City	Plaster Sports Complex
2016	2	Lamar	26–18	Trinity Catholic	Plaster Sports Complex
2016	3	Monett	27–18	Maryville	Plaster Sports Complex
2016	4	Harrisonville	21–14	Kearney	Plaster Sports Complex
2016	5	Vianney	49–14	Ft. Zumwalt North	Plaster Sports Complex
2016	6	Kirkwood	31–14	Blue Springs	Faurot Field
2017	8-Man	Worth County with Northeast Nodaway	64–21	Sacred Heart	Plaster Sports Complex
2017	1	Monroe City (15–0)	12–7	Valle Catholic	Faurot Field
2017	2	Lamar (14–0)	37–20	Lafayette County	Faurot Field
2017	3	Maryville (13–2)	47–9	Mt. Vernon	Faurot Field
2017	4	Webb City (15–0)	14–0	Ladue Horton Watkins	Faurot Field
2017	5	Staley (14–0)	36–35	Pattonville	Faurot Field
2017	6	Christian Brothers College (13–1)	31–14	Blue Springs	Plaster Sports Complex
2018	8-Man	Mound City with Craig	36–32	Worth County with Northeast Nodaway	Faurot Field
2018	1	Hayti	44–0	Lincoln	Faurot Field
2018	2	Blair Oaks	54–0	Lathrop	Faurot Field
2018	3	Trinity Catholic (13–2)	45–19	Cardinal Ritter (14–1)	Faurot Field
2018	4	Ladue Horton Watkins (15–0)	48–11	MICDS (13–2)	Faurot Field
2018	5	Vianney (11–3)	28–14	Fort Osage (9–5)	Faurot Field
2018	6	Christian Brothers College (12–1)	45–21	Rockhurst (11–3)	Faurot Field
2019	8-Man	Mound City with Craig	82–46	Southwest (Livingston County)	Faurot Field
2019	1	Valle Catholic (14–1)	30–27	Lincoln (14–1)	Faurot Field
2019	2	Lutheran North (15–0)	49–0	Ava (14–1)	Faurot Field
2019	3	Odessa (15–0)	49–28	Cassville (12–3)	Faurot Field
2019	4	Webb City (14–1)	48–0	Platte County (11–4)	Faurot Field
2019	5	Carthage (12–2)	27–21 (OT)	Jackson (13–1)	Faurot Field
2019	6	DeSmet Jesuit (14–0)	35–20	Joplin (13–1)	Faurot Field
2020	8-Man	Southwest (Livingston County) with Hale, Tina-Avalon	52–34	North Andrew	Chillicothe
2020	1	Windsor	43–20	Mid-Buchanan	Jefferson City
2020	2	Lamar	6–3	St. Pius X	Jefferson City
2020	3	Blair Oaks	62–40	Maryville	Jefferson City
2020	4	Helias Catholic	35–30	MICDS	Jefferson City
2020	5	Jackson	42–7	Platte County	Jefferson City
2020	6	Raymore-Peculiar	23–0	DeSmet	Jefferson City
2021	8-Man	Drexel with Miami (13–0)	48–42	Worth County with Northeast Nodaway (13–1)	Faurot Field
2021	1	East Buchanan (14–1)	21–4	Marceline (12–2)	Faurot Field
2021	2	Lutheran St. Charles (12–2)	33–27	Lamar (13–1)	Faurot Field
2021	3	St. Marys (12–1)	56–0	St. Pius X (12–2)	Faurot Field
2021	4	Smithville (13–0)	31–0	Hannibal (13–1)	Faurot Field
2021	5	Webb City (11–3)	26–21	Holt (13–1)	Faurot Field
2021	6	Christian Brothers College HS (13–1)	48–21	Liberty North (11–2)	Faurot Field
2022	8-Man	North Andrew (14–0)	54–24	Bishop LeBlond (10–4)	Faurot Field
2022	1	East Buchanan (14–1)	42–0	Adrian (12–3)	Faurot Field
2022	2	Blair Oaks (14–0)	32–27	Lamar (12–2)	Faurot Field
2022	3	Cardinal Ritter (14–0)	46–7	Reeds Spring (11–3)	Faurot Field
2022	4	St. Mary's (12–2)	42–0	St. Dominic (8–6)	Faurot Field
2022	5	Francis Howell (14–0)	49–21	Fort Osage (11–3)	Faurot Field
2023	8-Man	Archie (14–0)	40-26	Worth County with Northeast Nodaway (13–1)	Faurot Field
2023	1	Marionville (14–0)	29-0	North Platte (12–2)	Faurot Field
2023	2	Lamar (13–1)	35-28 (OT)	Valle Catholic (12–2)	Faurot Field
2023	3	Central Park Hills (11–3)	56–0	Seneca (13–1)	Faurot Field
2023	4	Kearney (13–2)	68–28	Hillsboro (12–2)	Faurot Field
2023	5	Cardinal Ritter (14–0)	38-25	Republic (12–3)	Faurot Field
2023	6	Liberty North (13–1)	38-7	Christian Brothers College HS (11–3)	Faurot Field
2024	8-Man	Archie (14–0)	48-20	North Shelby (10–4)	Spratt Stadium
2024	1	Adrian (13–1)	34–13	Penney (9–5)	Faurot Field
2024	2	Lamar (11–4)	28-25	Fair Grove (14–1)	Faurot Field
2024	3	Blair Oaks (14–0)	38-28	Seneca (13–1)	Faurot Field
2024	4	Lutheran North (13–1)	46–7	Festus (11–3)	Faurot Field
2024	5	Platte County (14–0)	49-14	Helias Catholic (12–2)	Faurot Field
2024	6	De Smet Jesuit (12–2)	35-20	Nixa (13–1)	Faurot Field
2025	8-Man	Worth County (13–1)	56–46	Rock Port (13–1)	Spratt Stadium
2025	1	Tipton (13–1)	39–14	Putnam County (13–1)	Spratt Stadium
2025	2	Blair Oaks (14–0)	59–0	St. Pius X (9–6)	Spratt Stadium
2025	3	Seneca (13–1)	33–26	Lift for Life Academy (10–5)	Spratt Stadium
2025	4	Kearney (14–0)	21–14	Hannibal (11–3)	Spratt Stadium
2025	5	Platte County (14–0)	34–28 (OT)	Carthage (12–2)	Spratt Stadium
2025	6	Lee's Summit (10–4)	41–37	Nixa (13–1)	Spratt Stadium

== See also ==
- List of Missouri state high school baseball champions
- List of Missouri state high school boys basketball championships
- List of Missouri state high school girls basketball championships
- List of Missouri state high school girls volleyball championships
- List of Missouri high schools by athletic conferences
