= List of high school athletic conferences in Missouri =

Following is a List of high school athletic conferences in Missouri:

- Archdiocesan Athletic Association
- ABC Conference (Missouri)
- Big 8 Conference (Missouri)
- Big Springs Conference
- Black River League
- Bootheel Conference
- Carroll-Livingston Activity Association
- Central Activities Conference
- Central Ozark Conference
- Clarence Cannon Conference
- Cooper County Activities Association
- Crossroads Conference
- Eastern Missouri Conference
- Four Rivers Conference
- Frisco League
- Gasconade Valley Conference
- Gateway Athletic Conference
- Golden Valley Vernon County Conference
- Grand River Conference
- Greater Ozarks Conference
- HDC Conference
- Highway 275 Conference
- I-70 Conference
- Interscholastic League of Kansas City
- Independent high schools (Missouri)
- Jefferson County Conference
- Kansas City Interscholastic Conference
- Kaysinger Conference
- Mark Twain Conference
- Lewis & Clark Conference
- Mississippi Area Football Conference
- Metro Catholic Conference
- Mid-Missouri Conference
- Midland Empire Conference
- Mid-Lakes Conference
- Missouri River Valley Conference
- North Central Missouri Conference
- Ozark Conference
- Ozark Foothills Conference
- Ozark Highlands Conference
- Ozark 7 Conference
- Public High League
- Platte Valley Conference
- Polk County League
- Scott-Mississippi Conference
- Show-Me Conference
- Southeast Missouri Conference
- South Central Conference (Missouri)
- SouthWest Central League
- Southwest Conference
- Spring River Valley Conference
- Stoddard County Activities Association
- Suburban Conference (Kansas City)
- Suburban Conference (St. Louis)
- Tri-County Conference (Central Missouri)
- Tri-County Conference (Northern Missouri)
- Tri-Rivers Conference
- West Central Conference (Missouri)
- Western Missouri Conference
- White River Conference
