= Burl Fowler Stadium =

Stadium in Monett, Missouri, US

Burl Fowler Stadium at Kenley Richardson Field
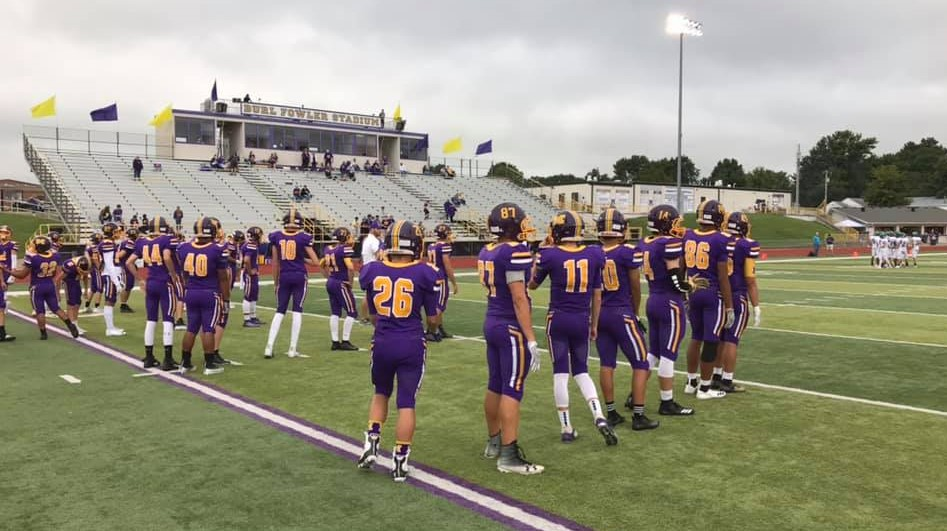
- Interactive map of Burl Fowler Stadium at Kenley Richardson Field
- Location: Monett, Missouri
- Coordinates: 36°55′39.5″N 93°54′52.5″W
- Operator: Monett High School
- Capacity: 2,200
- Surface: Grass: 1968–2014; Turf: 2014–present

Construction
- Opened: September 13, 1968
- Renovated: 1972, 2000, 2013, 2019, 2021, 2026
- Expanded: 1971, 1980, 2000, 2005, 2010, 2014
- Cost: $85,000 (1967)

Tenant
- Monett Cubs

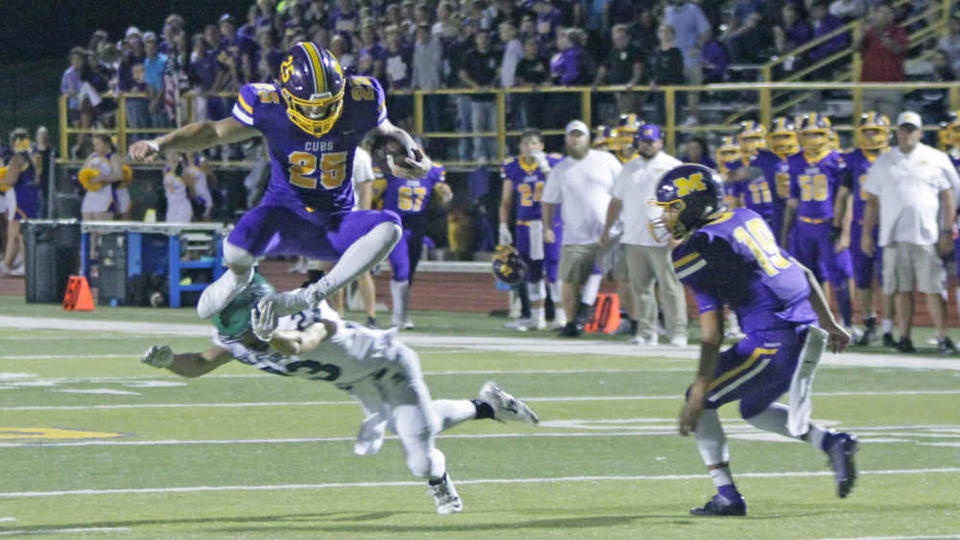
Monett football players

Burl Fowler Stadium is a stadium in Monett, Missouri. It is used for football, men's and women's soccer, men's and women's track & field, and is the home field of the Monett Cubs. Opening in 1968 and expanded since, the stadium holds approximately 2,200 people.

== History ==
The idea for a new stadium was initiated by Monett native and University of Missouri alumnus Jack Fox, who, after joining the Monett R-I School Board, convinced Board President Dr. Frank Kerr, Principal David Sippy, and Athletic Director Kenley Richardson to support the project.

The resulting stadium was later named for head coach Burl Fowler, who led the Monett Cubs to their first state championship win in 1971 with an undefeated 12–0 season. It was officially named in his honor in 1978. In 2019, the field was designated Kenley Richardson Field, recognizing Monett High School’s first Athletic Director and a pioneer of many of the school’s athletic programs.

The first game held here occurred on September 13, 1968. In front of 2,000 fans, the Cubs prevailed 18–12 against the Bolivar Liberators. Raymond Krueger scored the first touchdown in the new facility on a reverse handoff from Bob Meuser after a Liberators' punt.

In 1977, the stadium hosted its first state championship game in which the Cubs won their second state championship title under head coach Benny Lawson.

In 2012, the Cubs hosted John Burroughs and running back Ezekiel Elliott in the State Semifinals at Burl Fowler Stadium, losing 28-6.

In 2014, the Cubs once again hosted John Burroughs in the State Semifinals, falling short in the final drive to tie the game on a blocked extra point, 24-23.

== Athletics ==
Since 1968, the stadium has been a part of many Big 8 Conference, district, and state championships.

=== Big 8 Conference Championships ===
- Football - 1971, 1976, 1977, 1979, 1980, 1983, 1990, 1996, 1998, 2004, 2007, 2008

=== District Championships ===
- Football - 1985, 1990, 1996, 1997, 1998, 2004, 2007, 2008, 2012, 2014, 2016
- Men's Soccer - 2012, 2013, 2014, 2015, 2016, 2017, 2018, 2019

=== State Semifinalists ===
- Football - 2012, 2014
- Men's Soccer - 2016, 2018

=== State Championships ===
- Football - 1971, 1977, 2016

=== Rivalry Games ===
==== Barry County Brawl – Monett vs Cassville ====
Monett victories	Cassville victories	Tie games	Vacated wins

No.	Date	Location	Winning team		Losing team	
1	Oct. 4, 2013	Cassville, MO	Cassville	27	Monett	0
2	Sept. 19, 2014	Monett, MO	Monett	38	Cassville	0
3	Sept. 18, 2015	Cassville, MO	Monett	34	Cassville	6
4	Sept. 23, 2016	Monett, MO	Monett	21	Cassville	20
5	Sept. 22, 2017	Cassville, MO	Cassville	21	Monett	0
6	Sept. 7, 2018	Monett, MO	Cassville	49	Monett	12
7	Sept. 13, 2019	Cassville, MO	Cassville	21	Monett	14
8	Oct. 2, 2020	Monett, MO	Cassville	50	Monett	0

No.	Date	Location	Winning team		Losing team	
9	Oct. 1, 2021	Cassville, MO	Cassville	21	Monett	20
10	Oct. 21, 2022	Monett, MO	Monett	27	Cassville	10
11	Oct. 20, 2023	Cassville, MO	Cassville	42	Monett	7
12	Oct. 18, 2024	Cassville, MO	Cassville	41	Monett	24
13	Oct. 17, 2025	Monett, MO	Cassville	48	Monett	46
14	Aug. 28, 2026	Cassville, MO	Cassville	47	Monett	18
Series: Cassville leads 10–4

==== Cheese Bowl (presented by Schreiber Foods) – Monett vs Mt. Vernon ====
Monett victories	Mt. Vernon victories	Tie games	Vacated wins

No.	Date	Location	Winning team		Losing team	
1	Sept. 4, 2026	Monett, MO	Monett	32	Mt. Vernon	27
Series: Monett leads 1–0
