= Nevada High School =

Nevada High School may refer to:

- Nevada High School (Arkansas), based in Nevada County, Arkansas.
- Nevada High School (Iowa), based in Nevada, Iowa.
- Nevada High School (Missouri), based in Nevada, Missouri.
- Nevada State High School, based in Henderson, Nevada.
- Nevada Union High School, based in Grass Valley, California (near the Sierra Nevada foothills).
