= Big 8 Conference (Missouri) =

High school athletics conference in Missouri, United States

The Big 8 Conference
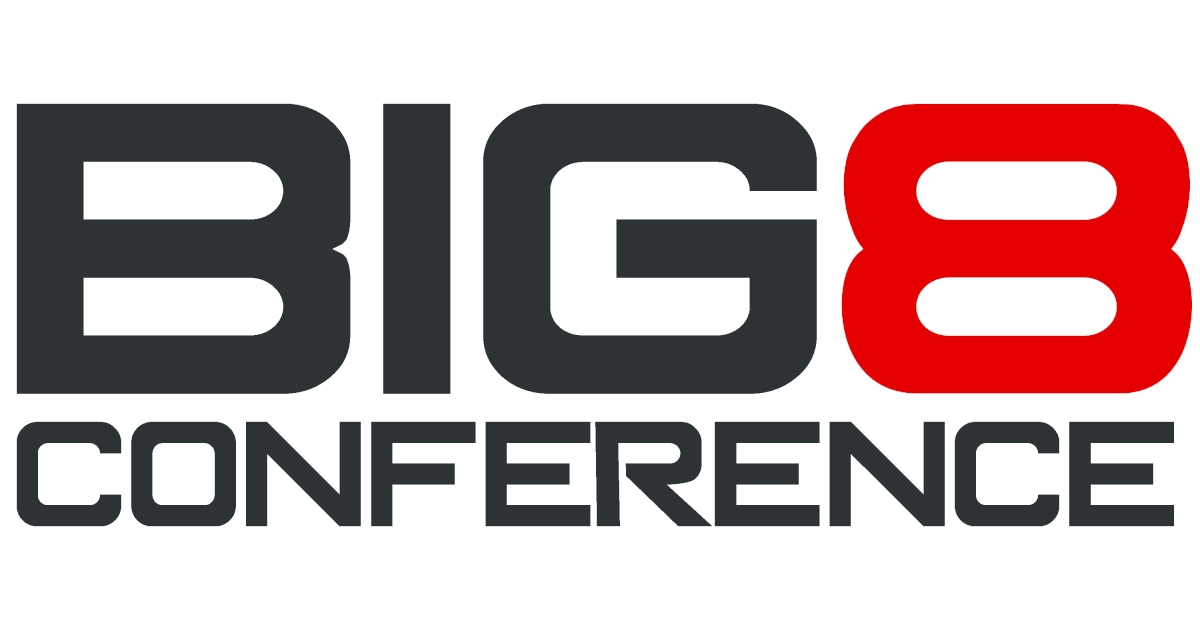
- Formerly: Big 10, Big 9, Big 13
- Association: MSHSAA
- Founded: 1928
- No. of teams: 9
- Region: Missouri Ozarks

The Big Eight Conference is an athletic conference within the Missouri High School Activities Association (MSHSAA) comprising medium-size high schools located in the Ozarks of southwest Missouri. The conference members are based around the Joplin and Springfield areas and are located in the counties of Barry, Barton, Lawrence, McDonald, Newton, and Vernon.

== Member schools ==
School	Nickname	Colors	City	County	School Enrollment (2024–25)	Primary MSHSAA class*
Aurora	Houn' Dawgs/ Lady Houns		Aurora	Lawrence	448	3
Cassville	Wildcats / LadyCats		Cassville	Barry	477	3
East Newton	Patriots		Granby	Newton	353	3
Lamar	Tigers		Lamar	Barton	293	2
McDonald County	Mustangs		Anderson	McDonald	830	4
Monett	(Lady) Cubs		Monett	Barry	569	4
Mt. Vernon	Mountaineers		Mt. Vernon	Lawrence	368	3
Nevada	(Lady) Tigers		Nevada	Vernon	561	4
Seneca	Indians		Seneca	Newton	373	3

== History ==
=== 1928 ===
The conference was established as the Southwest Activities Association but was known as the Big 10. Founding members were: Aurora, Carthage, Joplin, Lamar, Monett, Mt. Vernon, Neosho, Nevada, Springfield and Webb City.

=== 1953 ===
The Big 10 changed to the Big 9 when Springfield and Joplin left the conference and Cassville was added.

=== 1963 ===
The Big 10 was re-established when Carl Junction was added.

=== 1976 ===
The Big 10 added McDonald County, East Newton, and Seneca to form the Big 13 Conference.

=== 1979 ===
Webb City leaves the conference for two years thus causing the renaming to the Big 12 Conference.

=== 1981 ===
Webb City is reinstated into the conference. The conference is renamed the Big 13 Conference with schools divided into two divisions.

=== 1982 ===
Joplin (Memorial) lured Neosho, Webb City, Carthage, McDonald County, and Nevada to form the Big 6 Conference. The remaining schools formed the Big 8 Conference (Aurora, Carl Junction, Cassville, East Newton, Lamar, Monett, Mt. Vernon, and Seneca).

In 1985, Joplin Memorial merges with Joplin Parkwood to form Joplin High School and thus, the Big 6 Conference is renamed the Southwest Conference. Teams are: Joplin, Carthage, McDonald County, Neosho, Nevada, and Webb City.

=== 2013 ===
The Big 8 Conference voted to add McDonald County as its ninth member effective in July 2013.

=== 2015 ===
Carl Junction Leaves Big 8 Conference for the Central Ozarks Conference (Large).

=== 2017 ===
The Central Ozark Conference Small Division merged with the Big 8. Joining schools are: Logan-Rogersville, Springfield Catholic, Reeds Spring, Hollister, Marshfield and Nevada.

The Big 8 Conference was shaped into an East and West conference division.

The West Division includes: McDonald County, Monett, Nevada, Cassville, East Newton, Seneca, and Lamar

The East Division includes: Marshfield, Logan-Rogersville, Aurora, Reeds Spring, Springfield Catholic, Hollister, and Mt. Vernon.

=== 2024 ===
The Big 8 Conference members Logan-Rogersville, Springfield Catholic, Reeds Spring, Hollister, and Marshfield leave the conference to create the new Ozark Mountains Conference and/or join other conferences.

The conference is left with 9 teams with no plans to expand in the foreseeable future.

== State championships ==
=== Aurora Houn' Dawgs ===
- 1964 Boys Track & Field (B)
- 1969 Football (2A)
- 1999 Football (3A)
- 2017 Baseball (4)
- 2018 Baseball (4)

=== Cassville Wildcats ===
- 2008 Football (3)
- 2009 Football (3)

=== East Newton Patriots ===
- 1977 Boys Track & Field (2A)
- 1998 Volleyball (2A)

=== Lamar Tigers ===
- 2011 Football (2)
- 2012 Boys Cross Country (2)
- 2012 Football (2)
- 2013 Boys Track & Field (2)
- 2013 Football (2)
- 2014 Boys Track & Field (2)
- 2014 Football (2)
- 2015 Football (2)
- 2016 Boys Cross Country (2)
- 2016 Football (2)
- 2017 Boys Cross Country (2)
- 2017 Football (2)
- 2020 Football (2)
- 2023 Football (2)
- 2024 Boys Track & Field (3)
- 2024 Football (2)

=== McDonald County ===
- 1981 Girls Basketball (3A)
- 1983 Girls Basketball (3A)

=== Monett Cubs ===
- 1971 Football (2A)
- 1977 Football (2A)
- 2008 Wrestling (2)
- 2016 Football (3)
- 2017 Softball (3)
- 2019 Wrestling (2)
- 2020 Wrestling (2)

=== Mt. Vernon Mountaineers ===
- 1947 Boys Track (B)
- 1978 Football (2A)
- 2002 Girls Golf (1)
- 2004 Boys Golf (2)
- 2005 Boys Golf (2)
- 2010 Girls Basketball (3)
- 2012 Girls Basketball (3)
- 2016 Girls Softball (1)
- 2023 Girls Softball (2)

=== Nevada Tigers ===
- 1935 Boys Golf
- 1994 Girls Track & Field (3A)
- 2010 Softball (3)

=== Seneca Indians ===
- 1985 Wrestling (1A/2A)
- 1987 Football (2A)
- 1995 Football (3A)
- 2007 Cheerleading
- 2008 Cheerleading
- 2010 Wrestling (1)
- 2011 Cheerleading
- 2015 Cheerleading
- 2016 Cheerleading
- 2016 Wrestling (1)
- 2017 Cheerleading
- 2020 Cheerleading
- 2021 Cheerleading
- 2022 Cheerleading
- 2023 Cheerleading
- 2024 Cheerleading
- 2025 Cheerleading
- 2025 Football (3)

== Neighboring Conferences ==
- Ozark Conference
- Central Ozark Conference
- SouthWest Central League

== See also ==
- Missouri State High School Activities Association
- List of high school athletic conferences in Missouri
