= Caput, Missouri =

Extinct hamlet in Missouri, U.S.

Coordinates: 37.582°N 94.331°W

Caput is an extinct town in Barton County, in the U.S. state of Missouri. The town site is approximately five miles northwest of Lamar.

A post office called Caput was established in 1871, and remained in operation until 1895. Besides the post office, the community had a schoolhouse. The name Caput most likely is derived from Latin.
