= Tyler Nance =

American singer–songwriter (born 2003)

- Born: Charles Tyler Lee Nance; August 25, 2003 (age 22); Lamar, Missouri, U.S.
- Genres: Country rock; Bluegrass; Americana
- Occupations: Singer; songwriter
- Instruments: Vocals; guitar
- Years active: 2024–present
- Label: Santa Anna Records
- Website: www.tylernance.com//

Charles Tyler Lee Nance (born August 25, 2003) is an American country singer-songwriter originally from Lamar, Missouri. He gained prominence in 2025 with his viral single "Keeps Me Sane".

== Early life ==
Nance grew up in rural Lamar, Missouri, coming from a fourth-generation farming family where he raised cattle. Before pursuing music full-time, he graduated Lamar High School in 2022 and worked as a welder in Kentucky. Off the clock, he picked up a guitar he acquired and learned to play. He relocated to Nashville to develop his songwriting and recording career.

== Career ==
Nance released his first single "Bad News" in August 2024. His debut EP arrived in December, Wasted Chances, quickly amassing over 4 million streams. In July 2025, Nance released “Keeps Me Sane”, a song he co-wrote with Brent McCollough and Donnie Napier. The song went viral on TikTok and charted at No. 33 on Hot Country Songs. After the success of “Keeps Me Sane”, he was named Billboard’s Country Rookie of the Month for September 2025 and is working on a debut full-length album.

== Personal life ==
In August 2023, Nance was arrested in Hamilton County, Indiana, after being taken into custody by the Arcadia Police Department. He was charged with operating a vehicle while intoxicated, operating with a blood alcohol concentration of 0.15 or higher, illegal consumption of alcohol as a minor, and possession of false government identification; he was held without bond.

== Discography ==
=== Studio albums ===
Title	Details
Midwest Memoir	Released: March 20, 2026; Label: Santa Anna; Formats: Digital download, streaming

=== Extended plays ===
Title	Details
Wasted Chances	Released: December 18, 2024; Label: Santa Anna; Formats: Digital download, streaming
I'm Not Him	Released: May 2, 2025; Label: Santa Anna; Formats: Digital download, streaming

=== Singles ===
Title	Year	Peak chart positions				Certifications	Album
Title	Year	US Bubbling	US Country	US Country Airplay	CAN	Certifications	Album
"Keeps Me Sane"	2025	14	33	48	89	RIAA: Gold	Midwest Memoir

=== Promotional singles ===
Title	Year	Album
"Bad News"	2024	Wasted Chances
"Sorrows of a Sorry Soul"	2024	Wasted Chances
"Beer Tabs"	2024	Wasted Chances
"The Option"	2024	Wasted Chances
"One and Only Son"	2025	I'm Not Him
"Same Song and Dance"	2025	I'm Not Him
"Whiskey Me or the Pain"	2025	I'm Not Him
"Shovel"	2025	Midwest Memoir
"Hell If I Know"	2026	Midwest Memoir
"Midwest Memoir"	2026	Midwest Memoir
"Nothing's What It Seems" (feat. Jackson Dean)	2026	Midwest Memoir

== Tours ==
=== Opening ===
- The Eagle Flies Free (2026) (with Ian Munsick)
