= Henry Carroll Timmonds =

American politician (1853–1913)

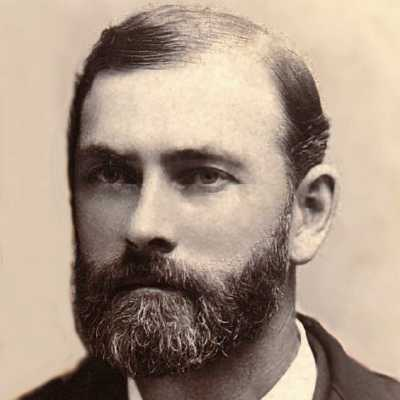
Henry Carroll Timmonds, in about 1892.

Henry Carroll Timmonds (May 12, 1853 – July 4, 1913) was an American judge and state legislator.

The oldest child of Dr. Landon Marion Timmonds and Jane Mandeville Tichenor, was born in Knoxville, Iowa, on May 12, 1853, less than a year after his parents moved there. Most of his life was spent in Missouri, growing up in Lamar and the general Barton County area where he was "Principal of Public Schools" for one term (at age 19 or 20), then marrying Katherine Faust in 1873 and moving to neighboring Cedar County, where he became editor (and printer) of the "Stockton Journal" from 1873 to 1878.

Even prior to his marriage and work as a journalist, H. C. Timmonds (called "Carroll" by his friends) had been interested in the law, and had read law under a local Lamar attorney. He continued to study the subject while producing the newspaper and while Superintendent of Stockton Schools for two years. Finally, after studying under Judge D. P. Stratton, he was admitted to the Stockton bar in 1880, becoming a lawyer. (His third child, the first after his being admitted to the bar, was Reba Stratton Timmonds, presumably so named as to honor Judge Stratton.) After passing the bar, Henry Carroll Timmonds moved back to Lamar, and set up legal offices with several other local attorneys, becoming Prosecuting Attorney for Barton County for two terms.

After a few years, he entered politics, running as a Democrat for the office of representative to the state legislature from Barton County, to which he was elected in 1887. He served in the thirty-fourth Missouri General Assembly, and was on the Judicial Committee.

Several years after his career as a legislator ended he was elected Judge of the Twenty-sixth Judicial Circuit Court, a position he held for about five years. After that time he was usually called Judge Timmonds. During his years as a judge, Henry Carroll Timmonds tried one case which involved much local and even some national interest, one of the so-called "boodle" trials. These cases involved several state senators who had solicited "boodle" (bribe money) in exchange for their votes. Oddly, this was not contrary to any Missouri statute at the time. Judge Timmonds, though, found Senator W. P. Sullivan guilty under the common law, and the senator was convicted and fined, thus setting a significant precedent.

Judge Timmonds moved to Kansas City, Missouri, in 1905, becoming a law partner of U.S. Senator William Warner. He was injured in a carriage accident that killed his wife, Katherine "Kate" Faust, in 1909, but remarried the next year, to Anastasia Murray. He died on July 4, 1913.

Wife and daughter of H. C. Timmonds, both from about 1905-1910.

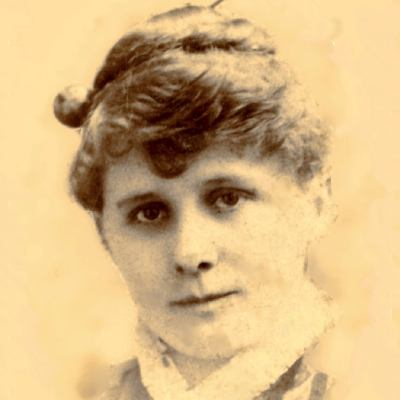

Katherine Faust Timmonds

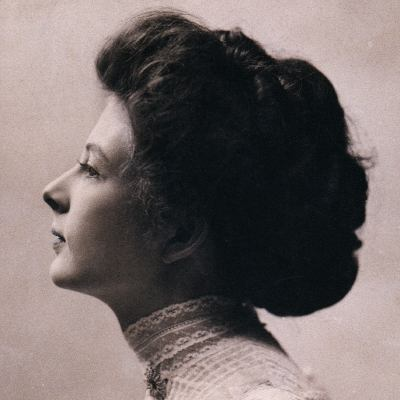

Reba Stratton Timmonds

== Sources ==
- Goodspeed Publishing (1889). History of Hickory, Polk, Cedar, Dade, and Barton Counties, Missouri: From the Earliest Time to the Present. Chicago: Goodspeed Pub. Co.
- "SOS, Missouri - State Archives: Missouri State Legislators 1820-2000".
- anonymous (July 10, 1913). "Henry Carroll Timmonds [obituary]". Lamar Democrat. Lamar, MO.
