= Lynching of Jay Lynch =

White man who was lynched in the U.S.

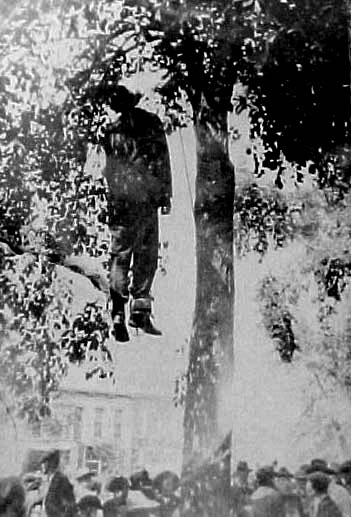
- The body of Jay Lynch after being lynched for murder of Sheriff Harlow and his son. Fifteen years earlier the tree had been planted by Sheriff Harlow.
- Date: May 28, 1919
- Time: Around 3:00 PM
- Location: Lamar, Missouri, US; 37.49497°N 94.27627°W
- Motive: Anger towards the murderer of Sheriff John Harlow and the sheriff's son
- Target: Jay Lynch
- Participants: Mob
- Outcome: Jay Lynch hanged
- Deaths: 1

The lynching of Jay Lynch, age 28, took place in Lamar, Missouri, on May 28, 1919. That year had 83 lynchings in the United States. This was one of four against white men. The lynching of Lynch, a career criminal who had just received a life sentence after pleading to the murder of a police officer and his son, was a major factor in Missouri reinstating the death penalty, mainly to deter future lynchings.

== Jay Lynch ==
Jay Lynch had a long arrest record. Crimes he was accused of included burglary and robbery. In Oklahoma City he allegedly stole a car, and in Kansas City he allegedly stole $300 ($5,600 in 2025) worth of women's silks. For almost a decade he was in and out of jail and escaped from prison several times. In 1918, he was hired on as a private detective of the Wabash Railroad in St. Louis. While working for the railway he was arrested for robbing a train. Lynch skipped bail on that charge and was later arrested near his sister's house near Lamar.

== Murder ==
On March 3, 1919, while being held in Lamar in connection with the Wabash Railroad boxcar robbery in St. Louis, Lynch asked to use the jailhouse telephone. When Sheriff John Marion Harlow Jr. of Barton County opened his cell, Lynch fatally shot the sheriff with a gun he had earlier smuggled into the county jail. Harlow's son, Dick Harlow, (Note: Some sources list the son's name as Walter Forrest Harlow) heard the commotion and ran to save his father, but was also mortally wounded by Lynch and died a few days later. After shooting the sheriff and his son, Lynch fled the state and drove across the country. He was denied entry to Mexico and was arrested again in La Junta, Colorado, on May 13, 1919, and sent back to Missouri.

Lynch pleaded guilty to murder and was sentenced to life in prison.

== Lynching ==
Fearing violence from the packed courthouse, presiding judge B. G. Thurman had the prisoner taken into his private office after the verdict to say goodbye to Lynch's family. In his office were the judge; Lynch's wife, baby, mother, and sister; and several deputies assigned to guard the prisoner. While Lynch was holding his child, 24 people burst into the office and overpowered the armed guards. The men put a noose around Lynch's neck and dragged him out of the courthouse. The noose's rope was thrown over a tree branch, but when he was strung up, it broke under the weight. Another, sturdier branch was chosen, and Lynch was hanged in front of a cheering crowd.

== Aftermath ==
The coroner's report listed the cause of Lynch's death as "at the hands of parties unknown". Prosecuting attorney H. W. Timmonds and sheriff W. A. Sewell of Barton County started an investigation into the lynching, but no charges were ever filed as no one was willing to identify the perpetrators.

The State of Missouri had abolished capital punishment in 1917. In large part due to the events surrounding Lynch's lynching, as well as the representative of Barton County, H. C. Chancellor, giving an impassioned speech calling for the death penalty; the punishment was quickly restored for seven crimes: treason, perjury, subornation of perjury, first degree murder, rape, kidnapping, and train robbery. It was signed into law by Governor Frederick D. Gardner.

== See also ==
- Lynching of Thurmond and Holmes

== Bibliography ==
=== References ===
- The Daily Ardmoreite (May 30, 1919). "Slayer of Sheriff and Son Hanged By Mob In Courtyard". The Daily Ardmoreite. Ardmore, Carter, Oklahoma: John F. Easley. pp. 1–12. ISSN 1065-7894. OCLC 12101538.
- Arizona Republican (2019). "Missourians Take White Man Out Of Court-Lynch Him". Arizona Republican. Phoenix, Maricopa, Arizona: Republican Pub. Co. pp. 1–16. ISSN 2157-135X. OCLC 2612512.
- Frazier, Harriet C. (2009). Lynchings in Missouri, 1803–1981. McFarland & Company. ISBN 9780786436682. - Total pages: 228
- Herald Democrat (May 29, 1919). "Mob Hangs Murderer". Herald Democrat. Leadville, Lake, Colorado: C.C. Davis & Co. pp. 1–6. OCLC 22412900.
- The New York Times (May 29, 1919). "Mob Enters Court and Hangs a Life Convict Sentenced Under Law Barring Death Penalty". The New York Times. New York, NY. ISSN 1553-8095. OCLC 1645522.
- Stebbins, Chad (1998). All the News is Fit to Print: Profile of a Country Editor. University of Missouri Press. p. 83. ISBN 9780826211637. - Total pages: 184
