= Keeps Me Sane =

2025 single by Tyler Nance

Single by Tyler Nance

from the album Midwest Memoir
- Released: July 11, 2025
- Recorded: 2025
- Genre: Country
- Length: 3:12
- Label: Santa Anna
- Songwriters: Tyler Nance; Brent McCollough; Donnie Napier
- Producer: McCollough

Music video
- "Keeps Me Sane" on YouTube

"Keeps Me Sane" is a song by American country music singer Tyler Nance, released on July 11, 2025. It was written by Nance himself, Brent McCollough and Donnie Napier and produced by McCollough. The song went viral on the video-sharing app TikTok and became Nance's breakout hit.

== Background ==
Tyler Nance wrote the song in the summer of 2025. As he recalled, he was sitting in his living room one night, when he grabbed his guitar, started mumbling out words and wrote the first verse. The next day, he showed the song to his co-writers at a writing session and they loved it. The song quickly achieved popularity on TikTok in the weeks before it was officially released, following which it garnered over 500,000 streams on Spotify and 300,000 views on YouTube in only four days. Within two weeks of release, the song gained over six million streams and reached Spotify's Viral 50 Global chart. Its success propelled Nance to the Billboard Emerging Artists chart at number 32.

== Composition and lyrics ==
The song contains fiddle, strong drumbeats, and acoustic guitar that is both strummed and picked. The lyrics feature nature and water-related imagery that captures the protagonist's personal struggles, vulnerability and angst as he ruminates on them. Tyler Nance begins by detailing the transition from summer heat to autumn maple leaves, to convey that unlike the seasonal cycle, his own problems do not resolve on their own. He describes being in the Nickajack and taking psilocybin, acknowledging they are merely distractions sugarcoating his struggles and suggesting he needs to find a social connection instead. Nance tries to work through them, but feels overpowered when he does. In the chorus, he admits he is to blame for his own mental pain, and although his habits are not supported by the people around him, they calm his overwhelmed mind. After a fiddle solo, Nance describes that even being in the peaceful, quiet environment of the mountain creeks does not provide him relief. He highlights the challenge of chasing his dream, which he symbolizes with the metaphor of rushing waters, as well as the paradox that even though his pursuit may drive him to insanity, it helps him move forward.

== Charts ==
Chart performance for "Keeps Me Sane"
Chart (2025–2026)	Peak position
Canada (Canadian Hot 100)	89
US Bubbling Under Hot 100 (Billboard)	14
US Country Airplay (Billboard)	48
US Hot Country Songs (Billboard)	33

== Certifications ==
Certifications for "Keeps Me Sane"
Region	Certification	Certified units/sales
United States (RIAA)	Gold	500,000^{‡}
^{‡} Sales+streaming figures based on certification alone.

== Release history ==
Release dates and formats for "Choosin' Texas"
Region	Date	Format(s)	Label(s)	Ref.
United States	October 20, 2025	Country radio	Triple Tigers; Akando	
