= Cassville Ranger Station Historic District =

Historic district in Missouri, United States

- U.S. National Register of Historic Places
- U.S. Historic district
- Location within Missouri Location within the United States
- Location: MO 248, near Cassville, Missouri
- Coordinates: 36°40′23″N 93°51′32″W
- Area: 5.1 acres (2.1 ha)
- Built: 1936
- Architect: Civilian Conservation Corps
- Architectural style: Colonial Revival
- MPS: Mark Twain National Forest MPS
- NRHP reference No.: 03000716
- Added to NRHP: August 4, 2003

Cassville Ranger Station Historic District is a national historic district near Cassville, Barry County, Missouri. It encompasses five frame and limestone buildings constructed by Civilian Conservation Corps in 1936:

- Colonial Revival style Ranger's Office
- Colonial Revival style Ranger's Dwelling
- Garage
- Warehouse
- Oil house

The site also has two stone carvings. It continues to be used as a ranger station for the Mark Twain National Forest. It was listed on the National Register of Historic Places in 2003.
