= Newton T. Enloe =

American doctor

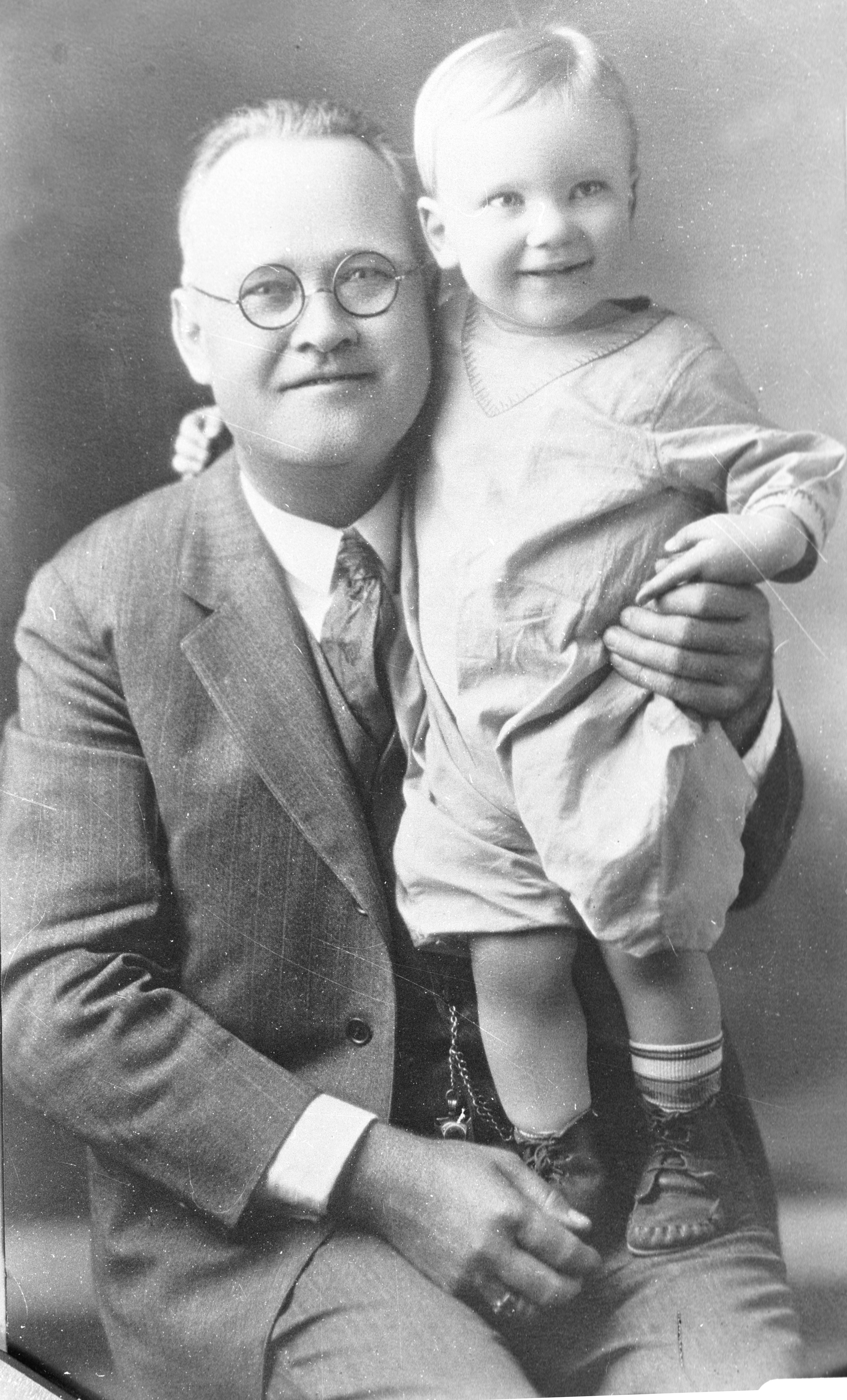
- Newton T. Enloe and an unidentified child, c. 1920s
- Born: Newton Thomas Enloe; February 23, 1872; Lamar, Missouri, U.S.
- Died: December 21, 1954 (aged 82); Chico, California, U.S.
- Education: Missouri Medical College of St. Louis
- Medical career
- Profession: Physician
- Institutions: Enloe Medical Center

Newton Thomas Enloe Sr. (February 23, 1872 – December 21, 1954) was an American doctor. Enloe was a native of Missouri and was raised in a family of medical professionals. He moved to California in 1901 to work as a mill surgeon for the Sierra Lumber Company, eventually establishing a practice in Butte County that grew into the Enloe Health system, one of the largest medical providers in Northern California.

== Life ==
Enloe was born February 23, 1872 in Lamar, Missouri (later the hometown of President Harry S. Truman). Several of his close family members were doctors in Western Missouri. Enloe completed his Doctor of Medicine degree at the Missouri Medical College in St. Louis, now the Washington University School of Medicine, in 1895. He then took postgraduate courses at the Chicago Graduate School and New York Polyclinic, before opening a private practice in Jefferson City. With his first wife, Winnie Herrick, Enloe had one son, Newton T. Enloe, Jr., who also later became a doctor. Herrick died in 1897, and for a time his younger sister Emma took on the duty of raising the young boy.

In 1901, Enloe relocated to California to work as the on-site physician at the Sierra Lumber Company's West Branch Mill, on the Butte-Tehama county line near Forest Ranch. After pawning a gold watch to buy materials, he constructed a small five-bed clinic and offered mill employees a one-dollar-a-month healthcare plan. He opened a private practice in nearby Chico in 1903-04, but continued working for the mill on a part-time basis treating minor illnesses and injuries; seriously injured workers were taken to facilities in Chico or San Francisco. Owing to the mill's isolation and the poor conditions of roads in the area, patients were often transported by log flume using purpose-built flume boat "ambulances".

While living in Chico, Enloe married his second wife, Isabelle Mansfield, in 1906. Mansfield died in 1921, and the following year Enloe married for a third time, to Dorothy Schram. They had a son and two daughters. During the First World War, the senior Enloe briefly left his Chico practice to serve with the U.S. Medical Reserve Corps, where he was commissioned as captain and treated war wounded at the Letterman Army Hospital in San Francisco. Enloe died in Chico in 1954, having outlived his son Newton Jr., who had been killed in an airplane crash on San Francisco Bay in 1946.

== Enloe Medical Center ==
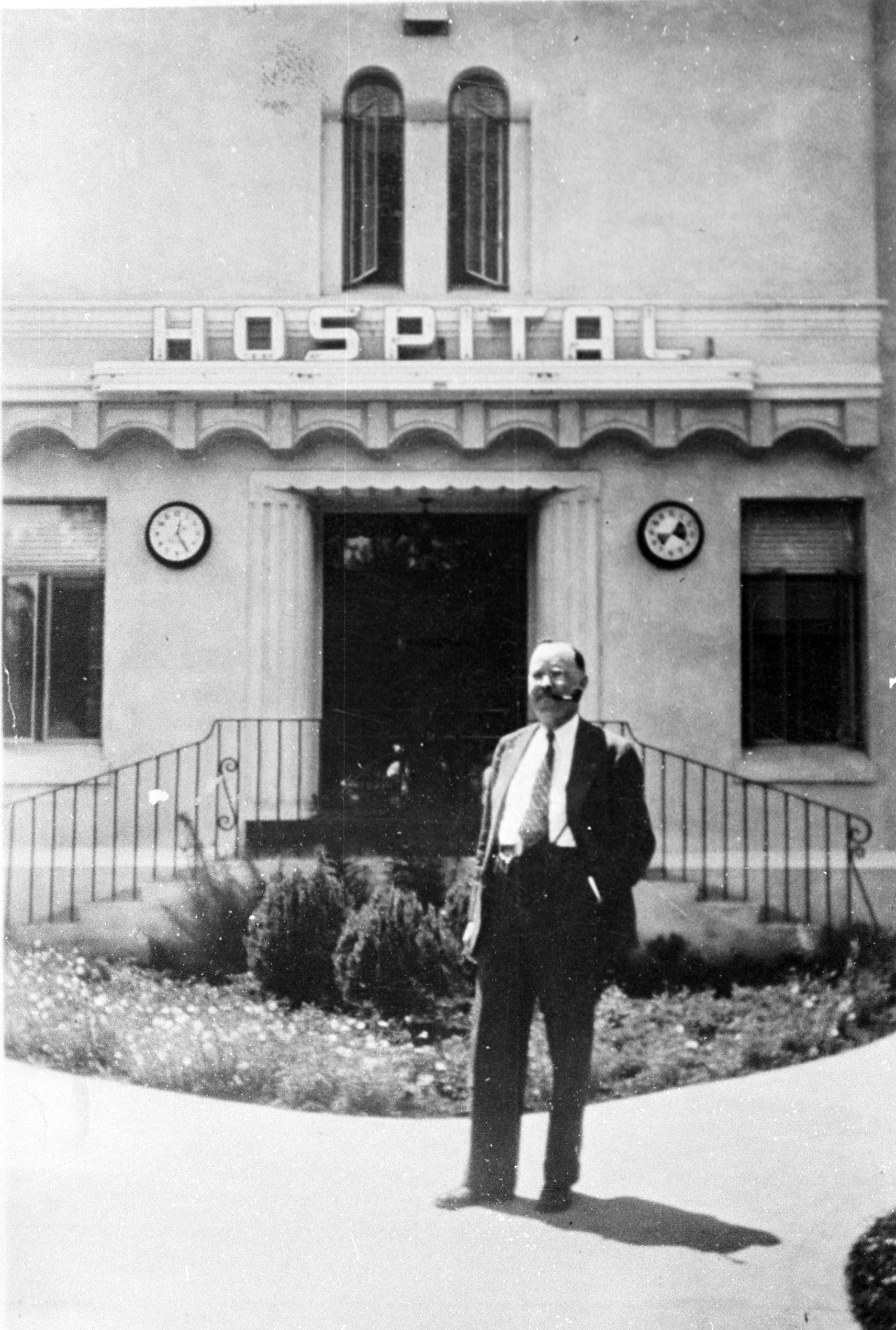
Dr. Enloe at the entrance to the relocated Enloe Hospital in Chico

Enloe is best known as the namesake of Enloe Medical Center in Chico, one of Northern California's largest hospitals. Dr. Enloe opened Chico's first hospital on Flume Street in September 1913. The hospital moved to its current location on the Esplanade in 1937, doubling its capacity. Shortly before Enloe's death, the hospital earned accreditation and added a maternity unit. After Enloe's death, his surviving son and daughters took over the management of the hospital. Numerous expansions over the years brought the hospital to its current 228-bed capacity. In 2023, the medical center rebranded as Enloe Health and currently operates over 20 facilities throughout the region, in addition to the main campus in Chico.

== See also ==
- Washington University School of Medicine
