= North Andrew High School =

Location
- 9120 Highway 48; Rosendale, Missouri 64483; United States
- Coordinates: 40°02′21″N 94°52′37″W

Information
- Type: Public
- Motto: Striving for Excellence
- Established: approx. 1994
- Teaching staff: 12.48 (FTE)
- Grades: 9-12
- Enrollment: 91 (2023-2024)
- Student to teacher ratio: 7.29
- Color
- Athletics conference: Grand River Conference
- Team name: Cardinals
- Website: northandrew.org

North Andrew High School is a public secondary school in Rosendale, Missouri.

== Currently ==
In 1996, North Andrew schools relocated to the junction of Highway 71 and Highway 48. Previously the district operated an elementary school in Bolcow, a middle school in Fillmore, and a high school in Rosendale. As of the 2021–2022 school year, the school has 116 students.

On November 29, 2013, North Andrew High School won the Missouri 8-man football state championship, defeating Stanberry 16 to 13. It was the lowest-scoring eight-man championship games in MSHSAA history. North Andrew also won the 2014 MSHSAA state championship game against Stanberry 56 to 38 making the Cardinals back-to-back state champions. North Andrew previously won eight-man state championships in 1993 (co-champions by tie), 1996 and 1997.
