= Grand River Conference =

High school athletic conference in northwest Missouri, United States

The Grand River Conference
- Current season, competition or edition: 2026-2027
- Formerly: Grand River Six
- Association: MSHSAA
- Founded: December 4, 1929; 96 years ago
- Organizing body: Superintendents Of Member Schools (GRC)
- No. of teams: 17
- Region: Northwest / Northeast Missouri
- Most recent champions: Softball: GRC - Marceline / GRC West - Princeton (2026) 11-Man Football: Putnam County (2026) 8-Man Football: Worth County (2026) Basketball (Boys): GRC - Gallatin / GRC West - Princeton (2026) Basketball (Girls): GRC - South Harrison / GRC West - Albany, Stanberry (2026) Baseball: GRC - Marceline / GRC West - King City (2026) Track & Field (Boys): GRC - Putnam County / GRC West - Worth County (2026) Track & Field (Girls): GRC - South Harrison / GRC West - St. Joseph Christian (2026) Golf (Boys): GRC - Maysville / GRC West - King City (2026) Golf (Girls): GRC - South Harrison / GRC West - Stanberry (2026) Wrestling (Boys): GRC - Marceline / GRC West - Stanberry (2026) Wrestling (Girls): GRC - Brookfield / GRC West - Rock Port (2026) Volleyball: South Harrison Scholar Bowl: GRC - Marceline / GRC West - King City (2026)
- Most titles: Softball: South Harrison (10) 8-Man Football: Worth County (5) 11-Man Football: South Harrison/Princeton (18) Baseball: Putnam County/St. Joseph Christan (4) Basketball (Boys): South Harrison (18) Basketball (Girls): South Harrison (18) Track & Field (Boys): Hamilton/Worth County (15) Track & Field (Girls): Hamilton (16) Wrestling (Girls): Polo (3) Volleyball: South Harrison (5) Scholar Bowl: Princeton (5)
- Website: grandriverconference.com

The Grand River Conference, is a high school athletic conference comprising small-size high schools located in northwest and north central Missouri. The conference members are located in Andrew, Buchanan, Daviess, DeKalb, Gentry, Grundy, Harrison, Linn, Mercer, Putnam, Sullivan, and Worth counties.

== History ==
Founded in December 1929, the conference was formed with six schools: King City, Stanberry, Maysville, Bethany, Albany and Grant City as the Grand River Six. By 1936, the conference had grown to eight teams. Various schools joined and dropped over the years, with several schools switching to 8-player football a contributing factor. By 2011, the conference had ten members, and by 2016, the conference was at 16 teams. On March 3, 2023, the superintendents of the conference voted to split into 2 separate conferences, Grand River Conference (GRC) and Grand River Conference West (GRC West), based on the previous divisional lines with Princeton joining the GRC West and giving the GRC the Brookfield Bulldogs (formerly of the Clarence Cannon Conference) and the Marceline Tigers (formerly of the Lewis & Clark Conference), who began GRC play in the 2024-2025 school year. On September 19, 2025, the GRC voted 8-1 to remove Polo from the conference at the end of the 2025-26 school year. Polo was the third school in conference history to be dropped from the conference by the membership.

== Member schools ==
As of 2026, the Grand River Conference consists of seventeen high schools split into two separate conferences.

=== Grand River Conference ===
School	Nickname	Colors	City
Brookfield	Bulldogs		Brookfield
Gallatin	Bulldogs		Gallatin
Marceline	Tigers		Marceline
Maysville	Wolverines		Maysville
Milan	Wildcats		Milan
Putnam County	Midgets		Unionville
South Harrison	Bulldogs		Bethany
Trenton	Bulldogs		Trenton

=== Grand River Conference West ===
School	Nickname	Colors	City
Albany	Warriors		Albany
King City	Wildkats		King City
North Andrew	Cardinals		Rosendale
North Harrison	Shamrocks		Eagleville
Pattonsburg	Panthers		Pattonsburg
Princeton	Tigers		Princeton
St. Joseph Christian	Lions		St. Joseph
Stanberry	Bulldogs		Stanberry
Worth County	Tigers		Grant City

=== Affiliate Members of The Grand River Conference West (Wrestling) ===
School	Nickname	Colors	City
Rock Port	Blue Jays		Rockport
East Atchison	Indians		Tarkio
