= Metro Catholic Conference =

High school athletic conference in Missouri, United States

- Association: MSHSAA
- No. of teams: 5
- Region: Greater St. Louis

The Metro Catholic Conference (MCC) is a high school athletic conference in Greater St. Louis.

== History ==
Until the founding of the MCC in 1991, the "Big Five" all-male high schools in the St. Louis area had never been in one conference at the same time, despite all having enjoyed long athletic traditions. While the schools had competed in several previous leagues—namely the Prep League, Bi-State Athletic Conference, and Catholic Athletic Conference—those conferences had all dissolved, due to declining numbers of member schools, logistical hurdles in having conferences with both Missouri and Illinois schools, and differences of opinion between Archdiocese-run schools and those run by religious orders. Since the MCC's formation, levels of competition have increased, schools have expanded their facilities, and in general the league has positioned itself as one of the state's most competitive high school competitions. Soccer has long been the dominant sport among MCC schools; while several schools have had competitive football teams (including state championships won by De Smet in 2005 and 2019, and CBC in 2014, 2017, and 2018, and Vianney in 2016 and 2018), it has been "the beautiful game" where the MCC has excelled. It is not uncommon for even the league's two smallest schools, Chaminade and Vianney, to field four teams, such is the popularity of soccer among their students. In fact, there has been only one season—2000—where the Missouri "Show-Me Cup" final did not feature at least one MCC team. In addition, ice hockey has become another popular sport among the schools, spearheaded by CBC's record winning streak from 2002 to 2006, where they won more than 130 consecutive games.

Sports offered by all MCC schools include: (fall) football, soccer, cross-country, swimming; (winter) hockey, basketball, wrestling, racquetball; (spring) golf, tennis, track and field, lacrosse, water polo, volleyball, rugby union, and baseball.

== Member schools ==
School	Nickname	Colors	Location	Affiliation	Enrollment (2023–24)
Chaminade	Red Devils		Creve Coeur	Private	826
CBC High School	Cadets		Town and Country	Private	1,318
De Smet	Spartans		Creve Coeur	Private	860
SLUH	Jr. Billikens		St. Louis	Private	1,506
Vianney	Golden Griffins		Kirkwood	Private	874

== Rivalries ==
Traditionally, a big rivalry in the MCC was between SLUH and CBC, which until CBC's move in 2003 saw the schools located three and a half miles apart from each other (SLUH on Oakland Avenue in the Kings Oak neighborhood of St. Louis City, CBC on Clayton Road in the neighboring suburb of Clayton). When the two teams played at SLUH its was called the Onslaught on Oakland, and when they played at CBC it was called the Clash on Clayton. Until the stadium's remodeling into a baseball-only park, the schools would play their annual football contest at Busch Memorial Stadium, joined in latter years by another rivalry: Chaminade–Vianney, the two Marianist schools in the league. Similarly, SLUH maintained a rivalry with its fellow Jesuit institution, De Smet.

== See also ==
List of high school athletic conferences in Missouri
