= Flat Creek Township, Barry County, Missouri =

Flat Creek Township
- Township
- Location in Barry County, Missouri
- Coordinates: 36°40′42″N 093°51′43″W
- Country: United States
- State: Missouri
- County: Barry

Area
  - Total: 53.31 sq mi (138.07 km^{2})
  - Land: 53.30 sq mi (138.05 km^{2})
  - Water: 0.0077 sq mi (0.02 km^{2}) 0.01%
- Elevation: 1,355 ft (413 m)

Population (2000)
  - Total: 5,462
  - Density: 103/sq mi (39.6/km^{2})
- FIPS code: 29-24436
- GNIS feature ID: 0766255

Flat Creek Township is one of twenty-five townships in Barry County, Missouri, United States. As of the 2000 census, its population was 5,462.

Flat Creek was organized in 1844, taking its name from Flat Creek.

== Geography ==
Flat Creek Township covers an area of 53.31 square miles (138.1 km^{2}) and contains one incorporated settlement, Cassville (the county seat). It contains six cemeteries: Corinth, Horner, Oak Hill, Pilant, Quaker and Russell.

== Transportation ==
Flat Creek Township contains one airport or landing strip, Cassville Municipal Airport.

== Notable people ==
- Don Johnson – actor, producer, director, singer and songwriter.
- Curtis F. Marbut – director of the Soil Survey Division of the U.S. Department of Agriculture
