= Monett High School =

High school in Southwest Missouri, US

Location
- 1 David Sippy Drive; Monett, Missouri 65708; United States; 36.9294°N 93.9078°W

Information
- Type: Public high school
- School district: Monett R-I School District
- Principal: Jessica McNichols
- Teaching staff: 48.24 (FTE)
- Grades: 9–12
- Enrollment: 739 (2023–24)
- Student to teacher ratio: 15.32
- Colors: Purple and gold
- Athletics conference: Big 8 Conference
- Mascot: Burl the Cub
- Nickname: (Lady) Cubs
- Rivals: Aurora, Cassville, Lamar, Mt. Vernon
- Website: monettschools.org/o/mhs

Monett High School is a public high school, located in Monett, Missouri which is located in the counties of Lawrence and Barry. It is part of the Monett R-1 School District and holds grades 9–12. As of the 2023–24 school year, it enrolls 739 students with a student-to-teacher ratio of 15:1.

== Academics ==
Monett provides student-issued Chromebooks as a way to broaden their horizons. Monett offers a "GOCAPS" program - which provides students a chance to learn outside of the traditional school setting, while earning credit, and allows them to work with local business partners on real world, hands on projects. Monett also participates in a program known as A+, in which students must maintain a 2.5 GPA and complete a certain number of service hours, most of which are completed through peer tutoring. Students who successfully complete the A+ program automatically get a free two-year scholarship to a two-year college in the state.

Students can register for dual credit courses through Missouri State University, Drury University, and Crowder College. Monett also participates in the Advanced Placement (AP) program.

Additionally, Monett hosts the Scott Regional Technology Center that allows students to explore career opportunities in various career paths like nursing, welding, child care, culinary arts, and more.

== Extracurricular activities ==
Monett students can participate in a number of extracurricular activities, including: Speech and Debate, Theater, Academic Team/Quiz Bowl, Science Olympiad, Future Business Leaders of America, Robotics Competition, Chorale music, Marching Band, Jazz Band, Art competition, Student Council, and National Honor Society.

== Athletics ==
Monett High School's official team nickname is the "Cubs" or the "Lady Cubs", and their mascot is Burl the Cub. They are a member of the Big 8 Conference and compete in sports and activities sponsored by the Missouri State High School Activities Association. Football, soccer, and track & field events are all held at Burl Fowler Stadium in Monett.

- Baseball - Men
- Basketball – Men & Women
- Cheerleading - Co-ed
- Cross Country – Men & Women
- Football - Men
- Golf – Men & Women
- Soccer - Men & Women
- Softball - Women
- Speech and Debate - Co-ed
- Swimming - Men & Women
- Track and field – Men & Women
- Volleyball – Women
- Wrestling - Men & Women

=== State championships ===
State Championships
Year(s)	Sport	Class
1971	Football	2A
1977	Football	2A
2008	Wrestling	2
2016	Football	3
2017	Softball	3
2019	Wrestling	2
2020	Wrestling	2

== Notable alumni ==
- Amber Cox, chief operation officer & general manager of the Indiana Fever
- Sally Shelton-Colby, U.S. Ambassador to Barbados, Grenada, and Dominica
