= Show-Me Conference =

High school athletic league in central Missouri, United States

- Association: MSHSAA
- No. of teams: 8
- Region: Central Missouri

The Show-Me Conference is a high school athletic conference composed of schools in central Missouri. The conference comprises smaller to mid-size schools in Class 1, 2, and 3 (in boys' basketball).

For the 2024–25 season, five schools (Eugene, Linn, New Bloomfield, Russellville, and South Callaway) will leave this conference along with Fayette and Harrisburg from the Lewis and Clark Conference and Tipton from the Kaysinger Conference to form a new Central Missouri conference. The new conference will be called the Central State 8 Conference.

== Member schools ==
School	Nickname	Colors	City	County	Type
Bunceton	Dragons		Bunceton	Cooper	Public
Calvary Luthern	Lions		Jefferson City	Cole	Private
Chamois	Pirates		Chamois	Osage	Public
Jamestown	Eagles		Jamestown	Moniteau	Public
Prairie Home	Panthers		Prairie Home	Cooper	Public
St. Elizabeth	Hornets		St. Elizabeth	Miller	Public
Tuscumbia	Lions		Tuscumbia	Miller	Public
Vienna	Eagles		Vienna	Maries	Public

== See also ==
- List of high school athletic conferences in Missouri
