= City Township, Barton County, Missouri =

Township in Missouri, US

City Township
- Township
- Location in Barton County
- Coordinates: 37°29′47″N 094°16′27″W
- Country: United States
- State: Missouri
- County: Barton

Area
  - Total: 4.14 sq mi (10.71 km^{2})
  - Land: 3.83 sq mi (9.93 km^{2})
  - Water: 0.31 sq mi (0.79 km^{2}) 7.38%
- Elevation: 968 ft (295 m)

Population (2000)
  - Total: 4,425
  - Density: 1,154/sq mi (445.6/km^{2})
- GNIS feature ID: 0766276

City Township is the smallest of the fifteen townships that make up Barton County, Missouri, US. As of the 2000 census, its population was 4,425. Despite being the smallest township by area, it is the most populous township. The township government is consolidated with the government of the city of Lamar.

== Geography ==
City Township covers an area of 4.14 square miles (10.7 km^{2}) and contains one incorporated settlement, Lamar (the county seat). According to the USGS, it contains one cemetery, East Side. City Township is completely surrounded by Lamar Township.
