= Big Springs Conference =

High school athletic conference in southeast Missouri, United States

- Association: MSHSAA
- No. of teams: 10
- Region: Southeast Missouri

The Big Spring Conference is a high school athletic conference comprising small-size high schools located in southeast Missouri. The conference members are located in the counties of Carter, Oregon, Ozark, Reynolds, Shannon, and Texas. It is named after the Big Spring in the Current River that flows through much of the area and many of the counties in the conference.

== Members ==
The Big Spring Conference consists of ten high schools. The conference comprises both Class 1 and Class 2 schools (in boys' basketball), the two smallest classes in Missouri. In 2024, Bakersfield, Dora, and Koshkonong joined the conference.

School	Nickname	Colors	City	County	Type	Year Joined
Alton	Comets		Alton	Oregon	Public	
Bakersfield	Lions		Bakersfield	Ozark	Public	2024
Couch	Indians		Myrtle	Oregon	Public	
Dora	Falcons		Dora	Ozark	Public	2024
Eminence	Redwings		Eminence	Shannon	Public	
Ellington	Whippets		Ellington	Reynolds	Public	
Koshkonong	Blue Jays		Koshkonong	Oregon	Public	2024
Summersville	Wildcats		Summersville	Texas	Public	
Van Buren	Bulldogs		Van Buren	Carter	Public	
Winona	Wildcats		Winona	Shannon	Public	

Bunker left the Big Springs Conference following the 2023–24 season, joining the Black River League.
