= Western Missouri Conference =

High school athletic conference in western Missouri, United States

- Association: MSHSAA
- No. of teams: 9
- Region: West - Central Missouri

The Western Missouri Conference, or WEMO, is a high school athletic conference comprising small-size high schools located in central western Missouri. The conference members are located in Barton, Bates, Cass, Jasper, and St. Clair counties.

== Member schools ==
The conference consists of Class 1 schools (some are class 2 in boys' basketball), the smallest class in Missouri. All schools play 8-man football.

School	Nickname	Colors	City	County	9–12 Enrollment (2024)	Primary MSHSAA Classification	Type
Appleton City	Bulldogs		Appleton City	St. Clair	86	Class 1	Public
Archie	Whirlwinds		Archie	Cass	127	Class 1	Public
Drexel	Bobcats		Drexel	Cass	65	Class 1	Public
Jasper	Eagles		Jasper	Jasper	111	Class 1	Public
Lakeland	Vikings		Deepwater	St. Clair	93	Class 1	Public
Liberal	Bulldogs		Liberal	Barton	80	Class 1	Public
Cass Midway	Vikings		Cleveland	Cass	91	Class 1	Public
Osceola	Indians		Osceola	St. Clair	138	Class 1	Public
Rich Hill	Tigers		Rich Hill	Bates	85	Class 1	Public

With Jasper and Liberal, the Western Missouri Conference stretches from the KC metro area to the Joplin metro area.
