= Sara Lampe =

American politician (born 1949)

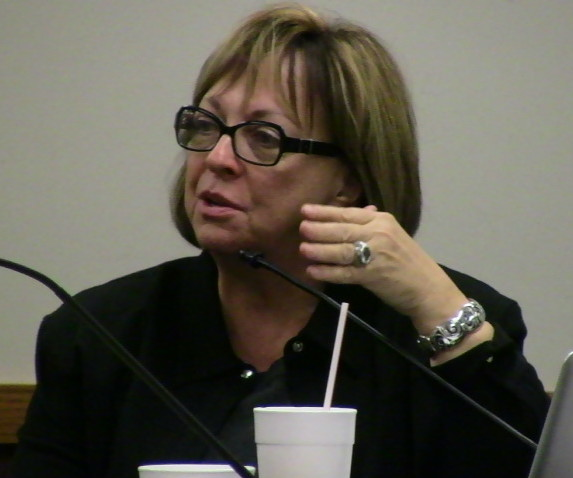

Member of the Missouri House of Representatives from the 138th district
- In office 2004 – present

Personal details
- Born: January 5, 1949 Cassville, Missouri
- Party: Democratic Party
- Education: Southwest Missouri State University
- Occupation: Educator

Sara N. Lampe (born January 5, 1949) is a Democratic Party member of the Missouri House of Representatives, representing District 138 (central Springfield) since 2004. She currently serves as Minority Caucus Secretary. Lampe is term limited by Missouri law from running for a House seat in 2012, and previously considered candidacy for Missouri Lieutenant Governor. In August 2018, she became the Democratic nominee for Greene County Presiding Commissioner.

== Personal life and education ==
Representative Lampe was born and raised in Cassville, Missouri, where her mother was a long-time educator. Following graduation from Cassville School in 1967, Lampe attended Southwest Missouri State University in Springfield, earning a bachelor's degree in Elementary Education in 1971, and a master's degree in Elementary Administration in 1976. Lampe has taught in Missouri Public Schools since 1971. She began as a teacher, then spent 19 years as the principal of Phelps Center for the Gifted.

== Honors and recognition ==
- 2010 Evelyn Wasserstrom Award
- 2008 Committed Statesperson Award from the National Multiple Sclerosis Society
- The Missouri NEA-Horace Mann Award by Missouri National Education Association
- Southwest MASA District Friend of Education Award 2007

== Legislative Work ==
Lampe began the 2010 Legislative Session with legislation honoring famed Jewish civil rights leader Simon Wiesenthal. She is also sponsoring anti-bullying legislation and legislation aimed at preventing traffic accidents due to text messaging drivers. Representative Lampe serves on the following committees:

- Budget,
- Appropriations – Education,
- Elementary and Secondary Education
- Utilities
