= St. Joseph Christian School =

Private school in Missouri, United States

Coordinates: 39°47′34″N 94°46′11″W

St. Joseph Christian School is a private Christian school at 5401 Gene Field Road in St. Joseph, Missouri. It is a non-denominational school serving students from the Northwest Missouri and Northeast Kansas area. Local businessman Joe Gregory founded the school in 1988, after receiving a vision, while in a Texas hotel, to build a Christian school in St. Joseph. He made a successful $30,000 sealed bid to buy the former Everett School at 14th and Olive in downtown St. Joseph, which had closed in 1985. In 2002, a new school was constructed on the city's northeast side. It is at the corner of Riverside Road and Gene Field Rd catty-cornered from the St. Joseph Youth Soccer Association in the 102 River bottoms. As of 2023, The school currently has 530 students in grades PreK-12. The school is divided into two sections: elementary (prekindergarten through 6th grade) and secondary (7th grade through 12th grade). The school's parent organization is the Area Ministers for Christ Corporation.

The St. Joseph Christian School football team won the state championship in 8-man football in 2006. It was runner up in 2004, 2008, 2009 and 2010. In 2019, the school partnered with Northland Christian School to expand its football team to 11-man. They have since separated to be 8-man again and in 2023 played in a District Championship game. “I implore there to be as many unique persons as possible, not following after their friends, parent, neighbors and siblings. But to follow into the spirit that makes them intrinsically unique”- Ezra peña
