= Cassville High School (Missouri) =

Location
- 1825 State HWY Y Cassville, Missouri 65625; United States
- 36.69035°N 93.86273°W

Information
- Type: Public
- School district: Cassville R-IV School District
- Principal: Tyler Willis
- Teaching staff: 39.92 (FTE)
- Grades: 9 to 12
- Enrollment: 626 (2023-2024)
- Student to teacher ratio: 15.68
- Colors: Black & Gold
- Athletics conference: Big 8 Conference
- Team name: Wildcats/ Lady Cats
- Rivals: Monett
- Website: https://www.csr4.org/high-school-home

Cassville High School is a public high school, located in Cassville, Missouri which is located in Barry County. It is part of the Cassville R-IV School District and holds grades 9-12. As of the 2023-2024 school year, it enrolls 626 students with a student-to-teacher ratio of 16:1.

== Academics ==
Cassville participates in the A+ program, which requires students to maintain a 2.5 GPA and complete a certain number of service hours, most of which are completed through peer tutoring. Students who successfully complete the A+ program automatically get a free two-year scholarship to a two-year college in the state.

Additionally, students may attend classes at the Scott Regional Technology Center in Monett, which allows students to explore career opportunities in various career paths like Nursing, Welding, Child Care, Culinary Arts, and more.

== Extracurricular activities ==
Cassville students can participate in several extracurricular activities, including: Speech and Debate, Theater, Future Farmers of America (FFA), Future Business Leaders of America (FBLA), Marching Band, Art competition, Student Council, and National Honor Society.

== Athletics ==
Cassville High School's official mascot is the Wildcats. They are part of the Big 8 Conference. Football, Soccer, and Track & Field events are all held at Wildcat Stadium in Cassville.

- Baseball - Men
- Basketball – Men & Women
- Cheerleading - Co-ed
- Cross Country – Men & Women
- Football - Men
- Golf – Men & Women
- Soccer - Men & Women
- Softball - Women
- Speech and Debate - Co-ed
- Swimming - Men & Women
- Track and field – Men & Women
- Volleyball – Women
- Wrestling - Men & Women

=== State championships ===
State Championships
| Year(s) | Sport | Class |
|---|---|---|
| 2008 | Football | 3 |
| 2009 | Football | 3 |

== Notable alumni ==
- Mary Easley - Oklahoma Senator (2004-2010), Oklahoma Representative (1997-2004), teacher
- Scott Fitzpatrick - Missouri State Auditor, Missouri State Treasurer, Missouri State Representative
- Sara Lampe - Missouri House Representative
- Melissa McFerrin - Head Coach of the Memphis Tigers women's basketball team, Missouri Tigers Women's Basketball player
