= Joe Ihm =

American politician

Joe Ihm (September 3, 1889 – March 13, 1951) was a member of the Missouri House of Representatives.

== Biography ==
Ihm was born to Charles Frank and Mary Helen (Weber) Ihm on September 3, 1889 in Sinsinawa, Wisconsin. He attended school in Lamar, Missouri and Salisbury, Missouri. He became a farmer and later a service station operator. During World War II, he enlisted in the Reserve Military Forces. A Roman Catholic, Ihm was a member of the Knights of Columbus and the Society of the Holy Name.

On July 4, 1921, Ihm married Doris Browne. They had a son, Eldon, before her death on July 23, 1949. On August 1, 1950, Ihm married Agnes Weller. They also had a son, John, born after his father's death. Ihm died in a motor accident in Humansville, Missouri on March 13, 1951 and was buried in Lamar Heights, Missouri.

== Political career ==
Ihm was a member of the House of Representatives in 1951, remaining a member until his death. Previously, he had been Treasurer of Barton County, Missouri from 1949 to 1950. He was a Republican.
