= Gasconade Valley Conference =

Missouri High School Athletic Conference

- Association: MSHSAA
- No. of teams: 5
- Region: Eastern Central Missouri

The Gasconade Valley Conference is a high school athletic conference comprising small-size high schools located in eastern central Missouri. The conference members are located in Crawford, Iron, and Maries counties.

== Member schools ==
| School | Nickname | Colors | City | County | Type |
|---|---|---|---|---|---|
| Belle | Tigers | | Belle | Maries | Public |
| Bourbon | Warhawks | | Bourbon | Crawford | Public |
| Cuba | Wildcats | | Cuba | Crawford | Public |
| Steelville | Cardinals | | Steelville | Crawford | Public |
| Viburnum | Blue Jays | | Viburnum | Iron | Public |

== Former Members ==
| School name | Mascot | City | County | School Type | Year Left | Current Conference |
|---|---|---|---|---|---|---|
| Vienna | Eagles | Vienna | Maries | Public | 2024 | Show-Me Central Conference |

== State championships ==
=== Cuba Wildcats ===
- 1992 Boys Cross Country (1A-2A)
- 1996 Scholar Bowl (3A)
- 1997 Scholar Bowl (3A)
- 1998 Scholar Bowl (3A)

=== Steelville Cardinals ===
- 1987 Girls Cross Country (1A-2A)
- 1988 Girls Cross Country (1A-2A)

=== Viburnum Blue Jays ===
- 1986 Boys Cross Country (1A-2A)
- 2000 Boys Track and Field (1A)

=== Vienna Eagles ===
- 1983 Softball (1A-2A)
- 1984 Softball (1A-2A)
- 2020 Softball (1)
