= Nevada High School (Missouri) =

Location
- 800 W. Hickory St; Nevada, Missouri 64772; United States; 37.844850°N 94.366427°W

Information
- Type: Public secondary school
- School district: Nevada R-V School District
- Principal: Robert Miner
- Teaching staff: 45.50 (on an FTE basis)
- Grades: 9-12
- Enrollment: 768 (2023-2024)
- Student to teacher ratio: 16.88
- Colors: Crimson and grey
- Athletics conference: Big 8 Conference
- Nickname: Tigers
- Affiliation: North Central Association of Colleges and Schools
- Website: sites.google.com/nevada.k12.mo.us/nhs2/our-school

Nevada High School is a public high school situated in Nevada, Missouri. It serves students in grades 9 through 12 and is the sole high school within the Nevada R-V School District.

== History ==
The school's first graduation ceremony took place in 1881.

== Academics ==
Nevada High School offers Advanced Placement (AP) classes, with approximately one-tenth of the student body enrolled in at least one AP course.

== Athletics ==
Nevada's athletic teams are nicknamed the Tigers and compete in the Big 8 Conference.

State Championships
Sport	Year(s)
Golf (boys)	1935
Softball	2010
Track and field (girls)	1994

== Performing arts ==
NHS fields two competitive show choirs, the mixed-gender "Soundsational Singers" as well as the all-female "Treble Effects". Since 1990, the program has also hosted an annual competition.

== Notable alumni ==
- Ed Emery, politician
- Brett Merriman, professional baseball player
- Bill Phelps, politician
