= Seneca High School (Missouri) =

High school in Missouri, United States

Coordinates: 36°50′16″N 94°36′23″W

Location
- 1110 Neosho Street; Seneca, (Newton County), Missouri 64865; United States

Information
- Type: Public high school
- Principal: Dan Hueller
- Teaching staff: 34.83 (FTE)
- Enrollment: 455 (2023-2024)
- Student to teacher ratio: 13.06
- Colors: Red, white and royal blue
- Nickname: Indians
- Website: www.senecar7.com/hs

Seneca High School is a high school located in Seneca, Missouri at 1110 Neosho Street.

Its enrollment in 2016-17 was approximately 420, and the district student-to-teacher ratio is a relatively low 18:1. Due to its proximity to Oklahoma (approximately 1/2 mile away), the school has a large number of American Indian students, approximately 69 across its four grades. The school is part of the Seneca R-VII school system, in Newton County, Missouri.

The school colors are Red (primary), White (secondary), and Blue (tertiary), their mascot is the Indian, and they play in the Big 8 Conference.

The district is bounded by the Joplin, Missouri school district to the north, the Neosho, Missouri district to the east, the McDonald County district to the south, and the Missouri state border to the west.

== State championships ==
- 1985 Wrestling (1A/2A)
- 1987 Football (2A)
- 1995 Football (3A)
- 2007 Cheerleading (3A)
- 2008 Cheerleading (3A)
- 2010 Wrestling (Class 1)
- 2011 Cheerleading (3A)
- 2015 Cheerleading (3A)
- 2016 Cheerleading (2A large)
- 2016 Wrestling (Class 1)

2025 Football (Class 3)

== Notable alumnus ==
- Scott Elbert, Major League Baseball player for the Los Angeles Dodgers
