= Valle Catholic High School =

High school in Ste. Genevieve, Missouri, US

Location
- 40 North Fourth Street; Ste. Genevieve, Missouri 63670; United States; 37°58′48″N 90°2′52″W

Information
- Type: Private high school
- Religious affiliation: Roman Catholic
- Established: 1925; 101 years ago
- Grades: 9–12
- Gender: Coeducational
- Student to teacher ratio: 20:1
- Colors: Royal blue and white
- Slogan: A community of faith, tradition, and excellence
- Athletics conference: Mineral Area Activities Association
- Mascot: Chief Touchdown
- Nickname: (Lady) Warriors
- Rival: Cross-Town: Ste. Genevieve High School; St. Vincents (Perryville)
- Accreditation: NCA
- Yearbook: The Valiant
- Tuition: $5,800 (2026–27)
- Website: valleschools.org

Valle Catholic High School is a private, Catholic high school in Ste. Genevieve, Missouri. It is located in the Archdiocese of Saint Louis.

== History ==
Valle Catholic was established in 1925 by the Sisters of St. Joseph. It serves residents in Sainte Genevieve County. In 1925, Reverend C. L. Tourenhout asked the Sisters of St. Joseph to organize a high school. They granted the request and opened the school in the stone structure south of the church at DuBourg and Market Streets. It was named Valle High School after Felix and Odile Valle, benefactors to the parish. A standard four-year course of studies was adopted, and Valle was granted accreditation by the state of Missouri.

== Academics ==
ACT scores are consistently well above of the national average. Each year, year the graduating class honors those with the highest GPA's; this includes the Top 10 and the selection of a class salutatorian and valedictorian.

Subjects include, but not limited to:

- Mathematics: Algebra, Geometry, Pre-Calculus, Trigonometry, Calculus
- Science: Biology, Chemistry, Environmental Science, Anatomy and Physiology, Physics, Psychology, Sociology
- History: Civics, Geography, World History, U.S. History, Western Civilization
- Language Arts: English, World Literature, American Literature, Modern Novels, Mass Media, Writing for Print, Spanish, French, German
- Fine and Practical Arts: Band (Marching and Concert), Art, Drama, Mechanical Drawing, Architectural Drawing, Web Design, Consumer Issues, Business Basics, Accounting, Economics
- Religion: Introduction to Catholicism, Understanding the Scriptures, Social Justice, Vocations

== Athletics ==
Valle Catholic has won 28 MSHSAA team state championships across six different sports. It has the second most state championships in football of any high school in Missouri with 15.

Sport	Classification	Years
Baseball (5)	Class 2	2009, 2014, 2015, 2016, 2018
Football (15)	Class 2A	1981, 1982, 1983
Football (15)	Class 1A	1988, 1989, 1990, 1991, 1992, 1995
Football (15)	Class 1	2010, 2011, 2013, 2014, 2015, 2019
Softball (1)	Class 1	2023
Boys' track and field (2)	Class 1	2011, 2012
Girls' track and field (2)	Class 1A	1997
Girls' track and field (2)	Class 1	2012
Girls' volleyball (3)	Class 1A–2A	1980
Girls' volleyball (3)	Class 1A	1989
Girls' volleyball (3)	Class 1	2010
