= Lamar, Missouri =

City in Missouri, U.S.

- City
- Seal

- Location of Lamar, Missouri

- Location within Missouri Lamar (the United States)
- Coordinates: 37°29′52″N 94°16′45″W
- Country: United States
- State: Missouri
- County: Barton

Area
  - Total: 5.53 sq mi (14.32 km^{2})
  - Land: 5.22 sq mi (13.51 km^{2})
  - Water: 0.31 sq mi (0.81 km^{2})
- Elevation: 951 ft (290 m)

Population (2020)
  - Total: 4,266
  - Density: 818.1/sq mi (315.88/km^{2})
- Time zone: UTC-6 (Central (CST))
  - Summer (DST): UTC-5 (CDT)
- ZIP code: 64759
- Area code: 417
- FIPS code: 29-40376
- GNIS feature ID: 2395617
- Website: cityoflamar.org

Lamar is a city in and the county seat of Barton County, Missouri, United States. As of the 2020 census, the city population was 4,266. It is known as the birthplace of Harry S. Truman, the 33rd president of the United States.

The Lamar city government is consolidated with Barton County's City Township. Because the city governance and township governance have different roles, circa 2002 the U.S. Census Bureau counted them as separate governments for census purposes. In addition, the city of Lamar is surrounded by, but is not part of Barton County's Lamar Township.

== History ==
Lamar was laid out in 1856. It was named for Mirabeau B. Lamar, second president of the Republic of Texas. The city suffered multiple attacks by rebels during the Civil War.

On May 28, 1919, a 28-year-old white man, Jay Lynch, was lynched in Lamar for the murders of Barton County Sheriff John Marion Harlow Jr., and his son, Dick.

Lamar was considered to be a sundown town prior to the Civil Rights era.

== Demographics ==
Historical population
Census	Pop.	Note	%±
1880	907		—
1890	2,860		215.3%
1900	2,737		−4.3%
1910	2,316		−15.4%
1920	2,255		−2.6%
1930	2,381		5.6%
1940	2,992		25.7%
1950	3,233		8.1%
1960	3,608		11.6%
1970	3,760		4.2%
1980	4,053		7.8%
1990	4,168		2.8%
2000	4,425		6.2%
2010	4,532		2.4%
2020	4,266		−5.9%
U.S. Decennial Census

=== 2020 census ===
As of the 2020 census, Lamar had a population of 4,266. The median age was 39.0 years. 24.9% of residents were under the age of 18 and 19.9% of residents were 65 years of age or older. For every 100 females there were 90.8 males, and for every 100 females age 18 and over there were 86.2 males age 18 and over.

0.0% of residents lived in urban areas, while 100.0% lived in rural areas.

There were 1,819 households in Lamar, of which 27.4% had children under the age of 18 living in them. Of all households, 43.3% were married-couple households, 17.2% were households with a male householder and no spouse or partner present, and 32.6% were households with a female householder and no spouse or partner present. About 34.1% of all households were made up of individuals and 17.8% had someone living alone who was 65 years of age or older.

There were 2,016 housing units, of which 9.8% were vacant. The homeowner vacancy rate was 3.0% and the rental vacancy rate was 3.5%.

Racial composition as of the 2020 census
Race	Number	Percent
White	3,821	89.6%
Black or African American	19	0.4%
American Indian and Alaska Native	46	1.1%
Asian	21	0.5%
Native Hawaiian and Other Pacific Islander	0	0.0%
Some other race	66	1.5%
Two or more races	293	6.9%
Hispanic or Latino (of any race)	144	3.4%

=== 2010 census ===
At the 2010 census there were 4,532 people, 1,866 households, and 1,202 families living in the city. The population density was 885.2 inhabitants per square mile (341.8/km^{2}). There were 2,099 housing units at an average density of 410.0 per square mile (158.3/km^{2}). The racial makeup of the city was 94.5% White, 0.7% African American, 0.6% Native American, 0.3% Asian, 0.7% from other races, and 3.2% from two or more races. Hispanic or Latino of any race were 1.9%.

Of the 1,866 households 32.5% had children under the age of 18 living with them, 45.9% were married couples living together, 13.9% had a female householder with no husband present, 4.7% had a male householder with no wife present, and 35.6% were non-families. 31.2% of households were one person and 17.7% were one person aged 65 or older. The average household size was 2.38 and the average family size was 2.96.

The median age was 39.6 years. 25.8% of residents were under the age of 18; 8.2% were between the ages of 18 and 24; 22.3% were from 25 to 44; 24.2% were from 45 to 64; and 19.5% were 65 or older. The gender makeup of the city was 46.6% male and 53.4% female.

=== 2000 census ===
At the 2000 census there were 4,425 people, 1,835 households, and 1,154 families living in the city. The population density was 1,154.5 inhabitants per square mile (445.8/km^{2}). There were 1,995 housing units at an average density of 520.5 per square mile (201.0/km^{2}). The racial makeup of the city was 96.61% White, 0.18% African American, 0.61% Native American, 0.34% Asian, 0.14% Pacific Islander, 0.34% from other races, and 1.79% from two or more races. Hispanic or Latino of any race were 1.40%.

Of the 1,835 households 32.0% had children under the age of 18 living with them, 48.2% were married couples living together, 11.4% had a female householder with no husband present, and 37.1% were non-families. 33.3% of households were one person and 18.1% were one person aged 65 or older. The average household size was 2.35 and the average family size was 2.98.

The age distribution was 26.6% under the age of 18, 8.5% from 18 to 24, 24.9% from 25 to 44, 19.5% from 45 to 64, and 20.5% 65 or older. The median age was 37 years. For every 100 females, there were 87.2 males. For every 100 females age 18 and over, there were 80.8 males.

The median household income was $29,296 and the median family income was $38,007. Males had a median income of $26,375 versus $20,688 for females. The per capita income for the city was $15,684. About 9.7% of families and 12.1% of the population were below the poverty line, including 11.0% of those under age 18 and 17.2% of those age 65 or over.

== Geography ==
Lamar is located in central Barton County adjacent to a bend in the North Fork Spring River and lies on US Route 160 just east of US Route 71.

According to the United States Census Bureau, the city has a total area of 5.43 square miles (14.06 km^{2}), of which 5.12 square miles (13.26 km^{2}) is land and 0.31 square miles (0.80 km^{2}) is water.

=== Climate ===
Climate data for Lamar 7N, Missouri (1991–2020 normals, extremes 1890–present)
Month	Jan	Feb	Mar	Apr	May	Jun	Jul	Aug	Sep	Oct	Nov	Dec	Year
Record high °F (°C)	77 (25)	81 (27)	93 (34)	95 (35)	98 (37)	107 (42)	118 (48)	113 (45)	105 (41)	96 (36)	87 (31)	77 (25)	118 (48)
Mean maximum °F (°C)	66.6 (19.2)	70.6 (21.4)	78.8 (26.0)	83.6 (28.7)	87.7 (30.9)	92.6 (33.7)	97.2 (36.2)	98.6 (37.0)	93.5 (34.2)	85.7 (29.8)	75.7 (24.3)	68.1 (20.1)	99.5 (37.5)
Mean daily maximum °F (°C)	42.5 (5.8)	47.5 (8.6)	57.2 (14.0)	66.9 (19.4)	74.8 (23.8)	83.6 (28.7)	88.4 (31.3)	87.9 (31.1)	80.4 (26.9)	69.5 (20.8)	56.5 (13.6)	45.6 (7.6)	66.7 (19.3)
Daily mean °F (°C)	32.4 (0.2)	36.7 (2.6)	45.7 (7.6)	55.3 (12.9)	64.5 (18.1)	73.5 (23.1)	77.9 (25.5)	76.8 (24.9)	68.9 (20.5)	57.6 (14.2)	45.8 (7.7)	36.0 (2.2)	55.9 (13.3)
Mean daily minimum °F (°C)	22.4 (−5.3)	26.0 (−3.3)	34.2 (1.2)	43.7 (6.5)	54.1 (12.3)	63.3 (17.4)	67.4 (19.7)	65.7 (18.7)	57.3 (14.1)	45.6 (7.6)	35.0 (1.7)	26.4 (−3.1)	45.1 (7.3)
Mean minimum °F (°C)	4.9 (−15.1)	9.5 (−12.5)	17.3 (−8.2)	29.8 (−1.2)	40.6 (4.8)	53.3 (11.8)	59.3 (15.2)	56.9 (13.8)	43.3 (6.3)	30.3 (−0.9)	19.6 (−6.9)	8.6 (−13.0)	0.9 (−17.3)
Record low °F (°C)	−22 (−30)	−28 (−33)	−12 (−24)	15 (−9)	29 (−2)	41 (5)	48 (9)	43 (6)	25 (−4)	16 (−9)	2 (−17)	−18 (−28)	−28 (−33)
Average precipitation inches (mm)	1.96 (50)	2.25 (57)	3.31 (84)	5.10 (130)	7.10 (180)	6.25 (159)	4.62 (117)	3.78 (96)	4.78 (121)	3.75 (95)	3.53 (90)	2.43 (62)	48.86 (1,241)
Average snowfall inches (cm)	3.2 (8.1)	1.8 (4.6)	1.4 (3.6)	0.0 (0.0)	0.0 (0.0)	0.0 (0.0)	0.0 (0.0)	0.0 (0.0)	0.0 (0.0)	0.0 (0.0)	0.2 (0.51)	0.7 (1.8)	7.3 (19)
Average precipitation days (≥ 0.01 in)	6.3	5.9	8.4	9.4	10.9	10.3	8.1	7.2	7.1	8.1	6.8	5.6	94.1
Average snowy days (≥ 0.1 in)	1.7	1.1	0.3	0.0	0.0	0.0	0.0	0.0	0.0	0.0	0.2	1.0	4.3
Source: NOAA

== Transportation ==
Lamar Municipal Airport (LLU) serves the city and surrounding communities. The airport has a 4,000-ft concrete primary runway with approved GPS approaches (runway 17-35) and a 2,900-ft asphalt crosswind runway with one approved GPS approach (runway 3-21).

== Education ==
Public education in Lamar is administered by Lamar R-I School District, which operates Lamar High School.

Lamar has a public library, a branch of the Barton County Library.

== Notable people ==
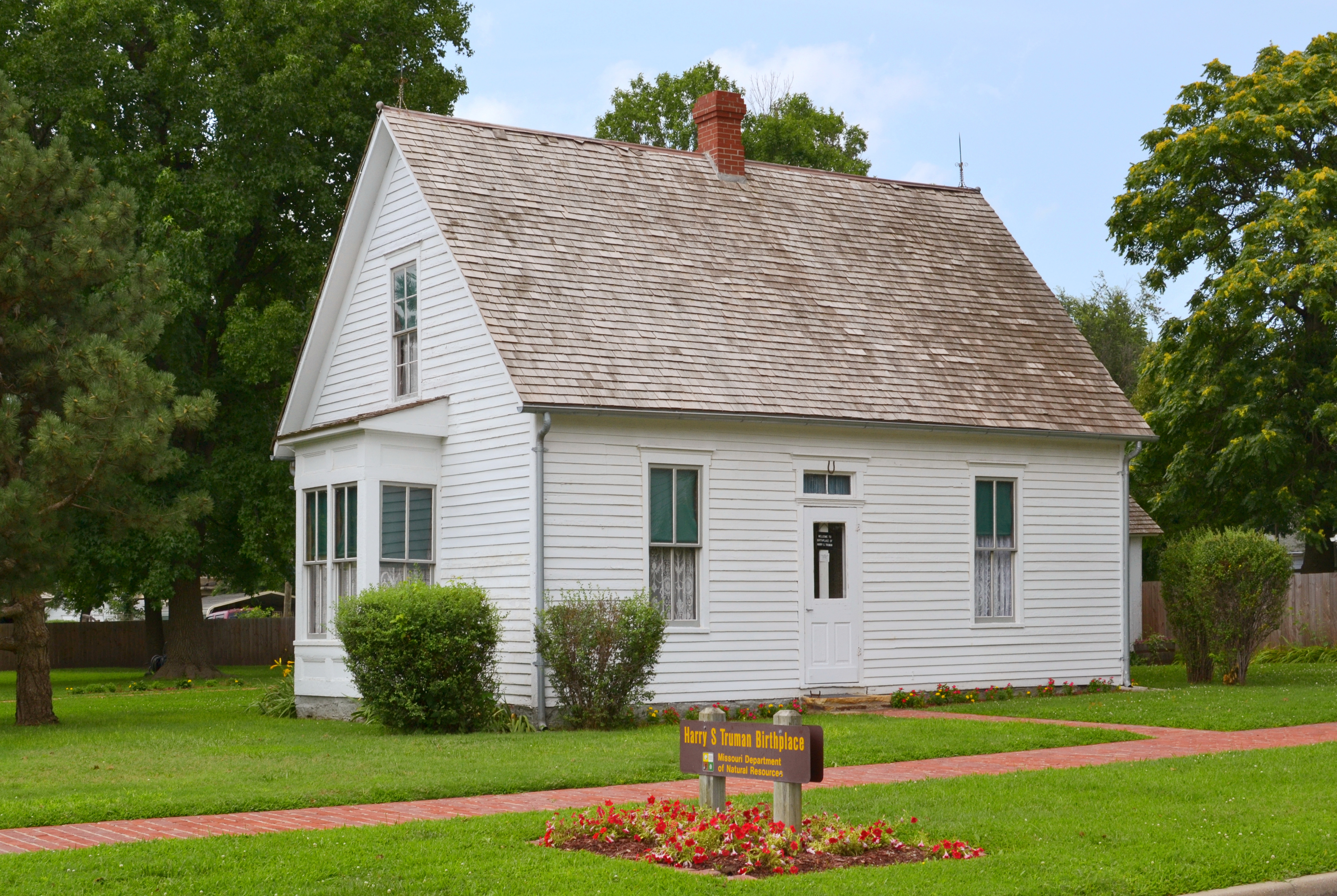
Birthplace of Harry S. Truman in Lamar

- Blaine Durbin, Major League Baseball player with Chicago Cubs, Cincinnati Reds and Pittsburgh Pirates in early 20th century
- Wyatt Earp and family, famous frontier lawman
- Ed Emery, Missouri state senator
- Newton T. Enloe, physician, founder of California's Enloe Health system
- Joe Ihm, Missouri state representative
- Charles Henry Morgan, U.S. representative from Missouri as both a Democrat (1875–79, 1883–85) and a Republican (1909–11)
- Tyler Nance, country singer-songwriter
- Guy Oliver, actor
- Henry Carroll Timmonds, Missouri state representative and judge
- Harry S. Truman, 33rd president of the United States

== See also ==
- List of cities in Missouri
- List of sundown towns in the United States
