= Cassville, Missouri =

City in Missouri, U.S.

- City
- Logo

- Location of Cassville, Missouri
- Coordinates: 36°40′42″N 93°52′10″W
- Country: United States
- State: Missouri
- County: Barry
- Township: Flat Creek

Area
  - Total: 3.42 sq mi (8.87 km^{2})
  - Land: 3.42 sq mi (8.86 km^{2})
  - Water: 0 sq mi (0.00 km^{2})
- Elevation: 1,319 ft (402 m)

Population (2020)
  - Total: 3,190
  - Estimate (2024): 3,247
  - Density: 932.0/sq mi (359.86/km^{2})
- Time zone: UTC-6 (Central (CST))
  - Summer (DST): UTC-5 (CDT)
- ZIP codes: 65623, 65625
- Area code: 417
- FIPS code: 29-11890
- GNIS feature ID: 2393769
- Website: cityofcassville.com

Cassville is a city in Flat Creek Township, Barry County, Missouri, United States, that is the county seat of Barry County. According to the 2020 census, the population of Cassville was 3,186. Cassville is one of the primary markets and job centers for an estimated 14,000 people living in the surrounding area.

== History ==
The land which would be called Cassville was platted in 1845. A post office was set up the same year. The community was named after Lewis Cass, a former United States Senator and Secretary of War. Cassville was incorporated on March 3, 1847.

During the forced removal of the Cherokee people along the Trail of Tears, a group traveling the northern route made a stop in Cassville, Missouri. According to the journal of Reverend Daniel S. Butrick, who accompanied the Cherokee on their journey.

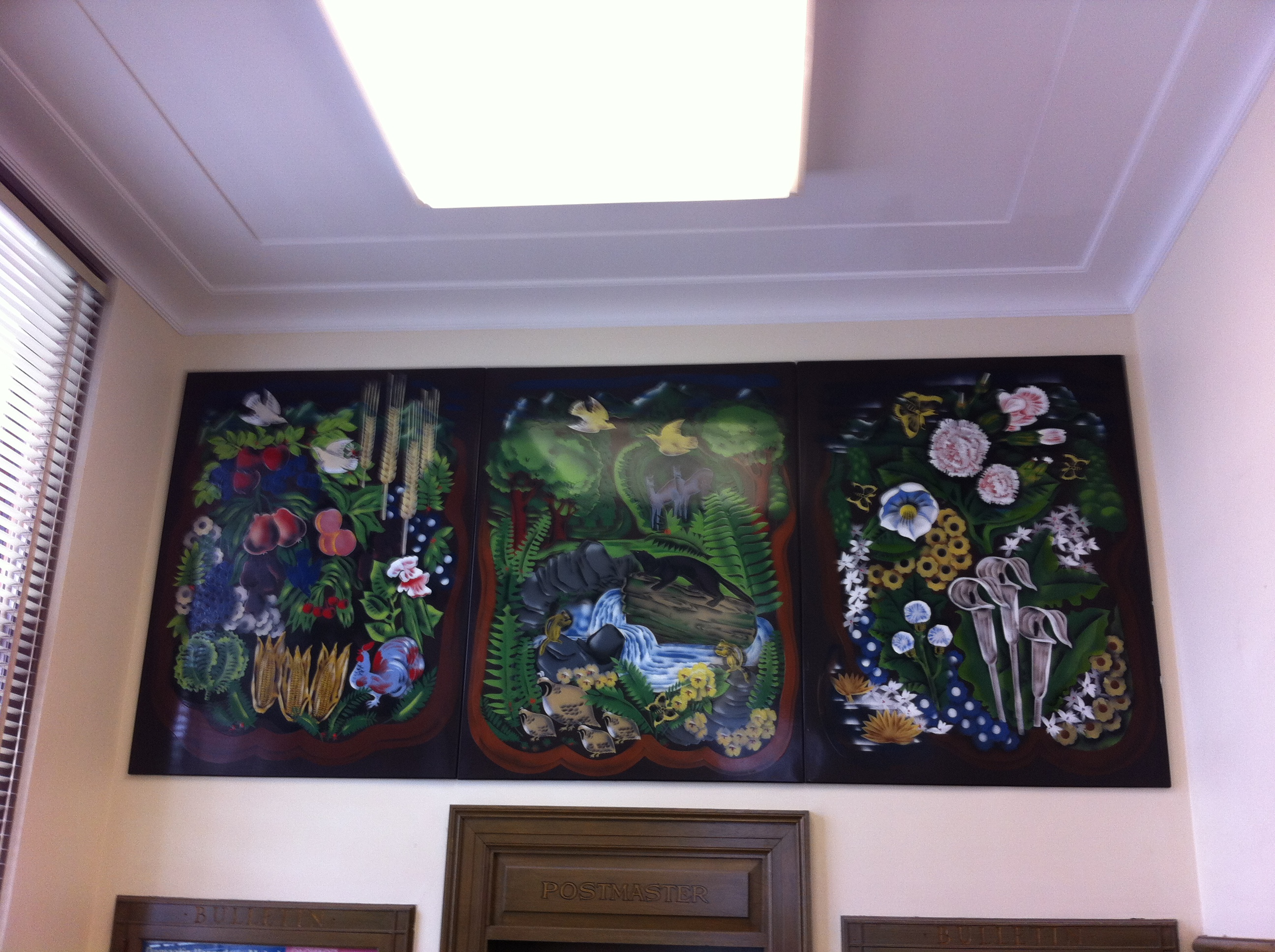
WPA mural, Flora and Fauna of the Region by Edward Winter, in Cassville post office

This event is one of many documented instances of violence against Cherokee people during their forced relocation under the Indian Removal Act of 1830. The Trail of Tears resulted in the deaths of thousands of Cherokee due to exposure, disease, and mistreatment by both U.S. government agents and civilians.

Cassville served as the Confederate capital of Missouri for one week from October 31 to November 7, 1861. This ended abruptly when the duly elected governor of the State, Claiborne F. Jackson, and his political and military allies were pushed further south by the invading Union army. The Battle of Pea Ridge later secured Missouri for the Union.

The city was connected by rail via the Cassville & Exeter Railroad from July 4, 1896, to September 11, 1956.

The Cassville Ranger Station Historic District, Natural Bridge Archaeological Site, and six sites in Roaring River State Park are listed on the National Register of Historic Places.

== Geography ==
According to the United States Census Bureau, the city has a total area of 3.22 square miles (8.34 km^{2}), all land. Located in the Ozarks, Cassville and its surrounding area have a densely forested hilly terrain. The city, itself, sits on Flat Creek. Located south of Cassville, Roaring River State Park is a popular recreation spot for hiking, fishing, and camping.

=== Climate ===
Climate in this area is characterized by relatively high temperatures and evenly distributed precipitation throughout the year. The Köppen Climate Classification subtype for this climate is "Cfa" (Humid Subtropical Climate).

Climate data for Cassville, Missouri (1991–2020 normals, extremes 1911–present)
Month	Jan	Feb	Mar	Apr	May	Jun	Jul	Aug	Sep	Oct	Nov	Dec	Year
Record high °F (°C)	77 (25)	86 (30)	86 (30)	92 (33)	92 (33)	101 (38)	106 (41)	108 (42)	102 (39)	96 (36)	85 (29)	80 (27)	108 (42)
Mean daily maximum °F (°C)	43.6 (6.4)	48.9 (9.4)	58.0 (14.4)	67.3 (19.6)	74.6 (23.7)	82.7 (28.2)	87.0 (30.6)	86.8 (30.4)	79.6 (26.4)	69.6 (20.9)	57.2 (14.0)	46.9 (8.3)	66.9 (19.4)
Daily mean °F (°C)	33.4 (0.8)	37.6 (3.1)	46.5 (8.1)	55.4 (13.0)	64.2 (17.9)	72.4 (22.4)	76.6 (24.8)	75.7 (24.3)	67.8 (19.9)	57.7 (14.3)	46.1 (7.8)	36.7 (2.6)	55.8 (13.2)
Mean daily minimum °F (°C)	23.2 (−4.9)	26.3 (−3.2)	35.0 (1.7)	43.5 (6.4)	53.8 (12.1)	62.1 (16.7)	66.2 (19.0)	64.6 (18.1)	56.0 (13.3)	45.8 (7.7)	35.0 (1.7)	26.5 (−3.1)	44.8 (7.1)
Record low °F (°C)	−19 (−28)	−24 (−31)	−2 (−19)	17 (−8)	26 (−3)	36 (2)	41 (5)	39 (4)	29 (−2)	15 (−9)	2 (−17)	−15 (−26)	−24 (−31)
Average precipitation inches (mm)	2.50 (64)	2.32 (59)	3.88 (99)	5.00 (127)	6.18 (157)	4.77 (121)	4.20 (107)	3.27 (83)	4.56 (116)	3.77 (96)	3.87 (98)	3.09 (78)	47.41 (1,204)
Average snowfall inches (cm)	1.0 (2.5)	1.1 (2.8)	1.0 (2.5)	0.0 (0.0)	0.0 (0.0)	0.0 (0.0)	0.0 (0.0)	0.0 (0.0)	0.0 (0.0)	0.0 (0.0)	0.0 (0.0)	0.8 (2.0)	3.9 (9.8)
Average precipitation days (≥ 0.01 in)	5.4	5.8	8.0	8.9	10.4	7.6	6.3	6.9	6.5	6.6	5.7	4.8	82.9
Average snowy days (≥ 0.1 in)	0.6	0.5	0.3	0.0	0.0	0.0	0.0	0.0	0.0	0.0	0.0	0.2	1.6
Source: NOAA

== Demographics ==
Historical population
Census	Pop.	Note	%±
1870	287		—
1890	626		—
1900	702		12.1%
1910	781		11.3%
1920	1,002		28.3%
1930	1,016		1.4%
1940	1,214		19.5%
1950	1,441		18.7%
1960	1,451		0.7%
1970	1,910		31.6%
1980	2,091		9.5%
1990	2,371		13.4%
2000	2,890		21.9%
2010	3,266		13.0%
2020	3,190		−2.3%
U.S. Decennial Census

=== 2020 census ===
As of the 2020 census, Cassville had a population of 3,190. The median age was 36.2 years. 27.1% of residents were under the age of 18 and 18.2% of residents were 65 years of age or older. For every 100 females there were 97.9 males, and for every 100 females age 18 and over there were 94.3 males age 18 and over.

0.0% of residents lived in urban areas, while 100.0% lived in rural areas.

There were 1,256 households in Cassville, of which 32.2% had children under the age of 18 living in them. Of all households, 44.3% were married-couple households, 17.9% were households with a male householder and no spouse or partner present, and 31.0% were households with a female householder and no spouse or partner present. About 30.3% of all households were made up of individuals and 14.4% had someone living alone who was 65 years of age or older.

There were 1,389 housing units, of which 9.6% were vacant. The homeowner vacancy rate was 2.7% and the rental vacancy rate was 8.9%.

Racial composition as of the 2020 census
Race	Number	Percent
White	2,709	84.9%
Black or African American	14	0.4%
American Indian and Alaska Native	48	1.5%
Asian	26	0.8%
Native Hawaiian and Other Pacific Islander	12	0.4%
Some other race	69	2.2%
Two or more races	312	9.8%
Hispanic or Latino (of any race)	209	6.6%

=== 2010 census ===
As of the census of 2010, there were 3,266 people, 1,275 households, and 848 families living in the city. The population density was 1,014.3 inhabitants per square mile (391.6/km^{2}). There were 1,402 housing units at an average density of 435.4 per square mile (168.1/km^{2}). The racial makeup of the city was 93.8% White, 0.4% African American, 1.7% Native American, 0.3% Asian, 2.1% from other races, and 1.8% from two or more races. Hispanic or Latino of any race were 4.6% of the population.

There were 1,275 households, of which 34.2% had children under the age of 18 living with them, 48.9% were married couples living together, 13.1% had a female householder with no husband present, 4.5% had a male householder with no wife present, and 33.5% were non-families. 30.0% of all households were made up of individuals, and 16% had someone living alone who was 65 years of age or older. The average household size was 2.43 and the average family size was 2.99.

The median age in the city was 40.5 years. 23.8% of residents were under the age of 18; 8.4% were between the ages of 18 and 24; 23% were from 25 to 44; 25.3% were from 45 to 64; and 19.3% were 65 years of age or older. The gender makeup of the city was 46.8% male and 53.2% female.

=== 2000 census ===
As of the census of 2000, there were 2,890 people, 1,194 households, and 770 families living in the city. The population density was 1,046.0 inhabitants per square mile (403.9/km^{2}). There were 1,307 housing units at an average density of 473.0 per square mile (182.6/km^{2}). The racial makeup of the city was 96.30% White, 0.03% African American, 0.73% Native American, 0.69% Asian, 1.11% from other races, and 1.14% from two or more races. Hispanic or Latino of any race were 2.63% of the population.

There were 1,194 households, out of which 30.2% had children under the age of 18 living with them, 50.1% were married couples living together, 10.9% had a female householder with no husband present, and 35.5% were non-families. 31.7% of all households were made up of individuals, and 15.7% had someone living alone who was 65 years of age or older. The average household size was 2.35 and the average family size was 2.95.

In the city, the population was spread out, with 25.5% under the age of 18, 8.2% from 18 to 24, 26.4% from 25 to 44, 21.7% from 45 to 64, and 18.2% who were 65 years of age or older. The median age was 38 years. For every 100 females, there were 90.3 males. For every 100 females age 18 and over, there were 85.8 males.

The median income for a household in the city was $27,351, and the median income for a family was $34,074. Males had a median income of $22,952 versus $19,120 for females. The per capita income for the city was $16,660. About 12.3% of families and 15.4% of the population were below the poverty line, including 21.4% of those under age 18 and 12.4% of those age 65 or over.

== Government ==
The City of Cassville is managed by four-member Board of Aldermen (City Council) with Jon Horner serving as the Mayor. Richard Asbill serves as City Administrator.

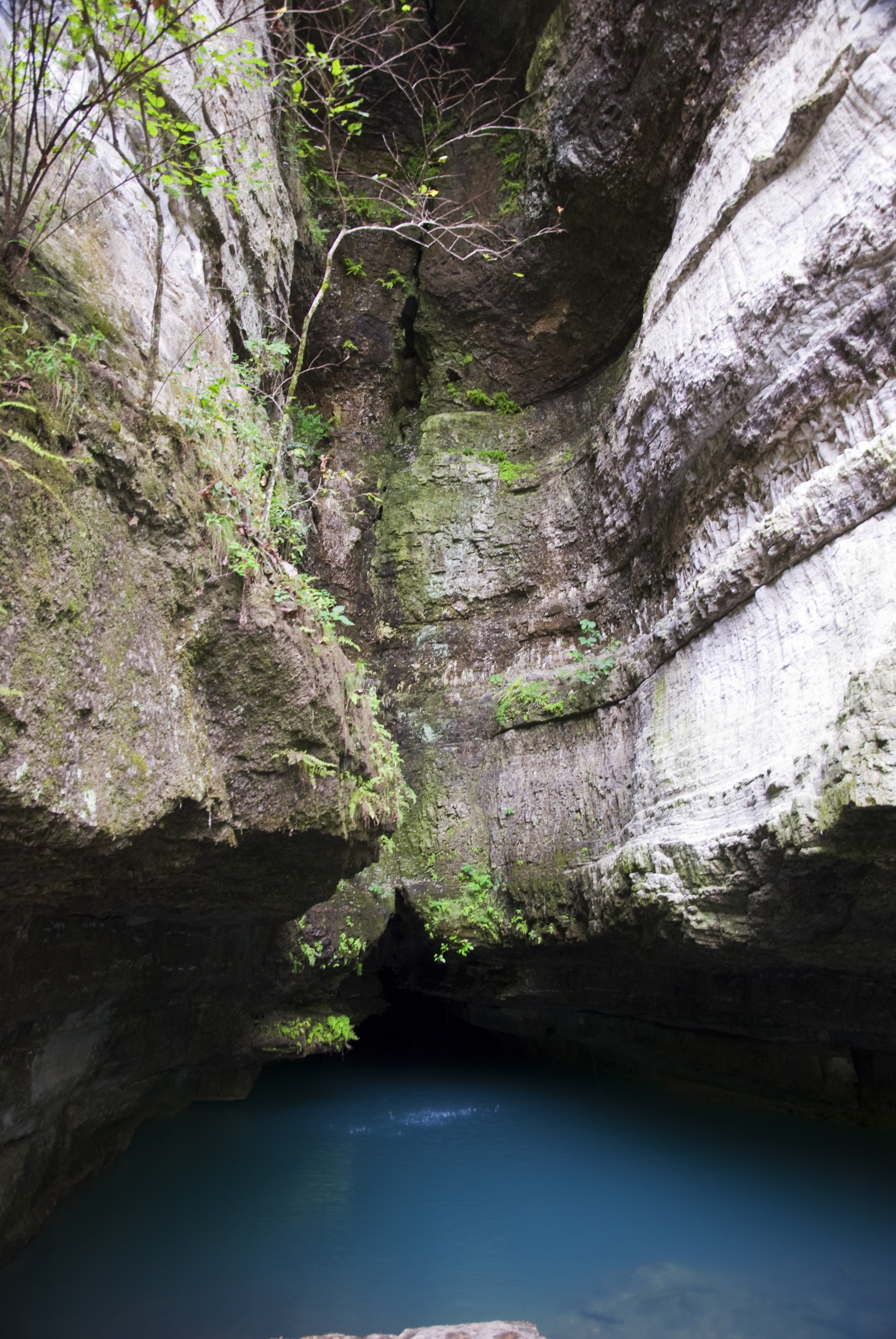
Roaring River Spring is the source of Roaring River. The average daily flow is 20.4 million gallons of water. The cave runs over 220 feet deep.

== Education ==
Cassville R-IV School District operates one elementary school, one middle school, one intermediate school, and Cassville High School.

Cassville has a public library, a branch of the Barry-Lawrence Regional Library.

Crowder College offers two-year degree programs in Cassville.

Since August 2022 the Cassville school uses corporal punishment again.

== Transportation ==
The city owns a small general aviation airport two miles northwest of Cassville, named the Cassville Municipal Airport.

== Notable people ==
- Clete Boyer - Major League Baseball player
- Gene Brown - Professor Emeritus of Biochemistry at the Massachusetts Institute of Technology (MIT)
- Mary Easley - Oklahoma Senator (2004–2010), Oklahoma Representative (1997–2004), teacher
- Scott Fitzpatrick - Missouri State Auditor, Missouri State Treasurer, Missouri State Representative
- Durward G. Hall - U.S. House Representative from Missouri's 7th District
- Sara Lampe - Missouri House Representative
- Melissa McFerrin - Head Coach of the Memphis Tigers women's basketball team, Missouri Tigers Women's Basketball player
- Curtis F. Marbut - Director of the Soil Survey Division of the U.S. Department of Agriculture
- Emory Melton - Missouri State Senator 29th district
- David Sater - Missouri State Senator, Missouri House Representative

== See also ==
- List of cities in Missouri
