= Lamar High School (Missouri) =

Location
- 503 Maple; Lamar, Missouri 64759; United States; 37°30′05″N 94°16′56″W

Information
- Type: Public
- Established: 1858
- School district: Lamar R-I School District
- Principal: Jim Weber
- Teaching staff: 25.82 (FTE)
- Grades: 9–12
- Enrollment: 369 (2024-2025)
- Student to teacher ratio: 14.29
- Colors: Red and black
- Fight song: On Wisconsin
- Athletics conference: Big 8 Conference
- Mascot: Tigers
- Website: sites.google.com/lamar.k12.mo.us/lamarhighschool

Lamar High School is the public high school in Lamar, Missouri, United States. It is part of the Lamar R-I School District which has 4 buildings the East Primary School (Pre-k - 2nd), West Elementary School (3rd - 5th), Lamar Middle School (6th-8th), and Lamar High School (9th - 12th).

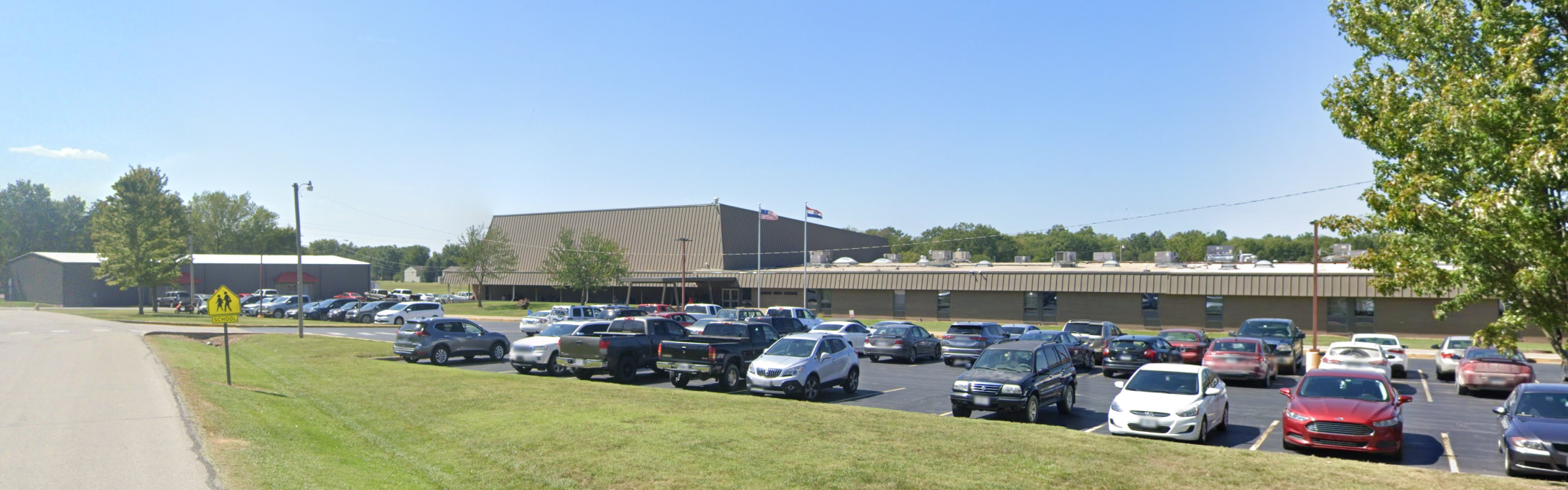
Lamar High School

== Academics ==
Lamar High School Partners with Missouri Southern State University for all AP and Dual Credit courses in the school. Along with being connected to the Lamar Vocational and Technical School which teaches Carpentry, Auto mechanic, Nursing, Wood work and drafting, and Digital Design.

== Athletics ==
The Lamar High School Athletic Department was founded in 1905 and plays in the Big 8 Conference. The teams' nickname is the Tigers for both male and female sports. Lamar competes in the MSHSAA Class 1 for tennis, Class 2 for football and cross country, and Class 3 in baseball, basketball, and track and field. Since 1933, In Football, the Lamar Tigers would face the Nevada Tigers for the Battle of the Silver Tiger, a silver coated statue of a tiger that would go to the winning school for the year. The Tigers hold the MSHSAA record for most consecutive state Championships won at 7 between 2011 and 2017, and ties the 3rd most state championships won at 10. The Lamar Tigers football program is also a part of the Missouri Sports Hall of Fame, being inducted in 2018.

The school's football and track stadium is named Scott Bailey Field at Thomas M. O'Sullivan Stadium and the baseball field is named Shoff Field. Lamar has a total of 16 Team State Championships, 7 Second Place, 3 Third Place, and 6 Fourth Place.

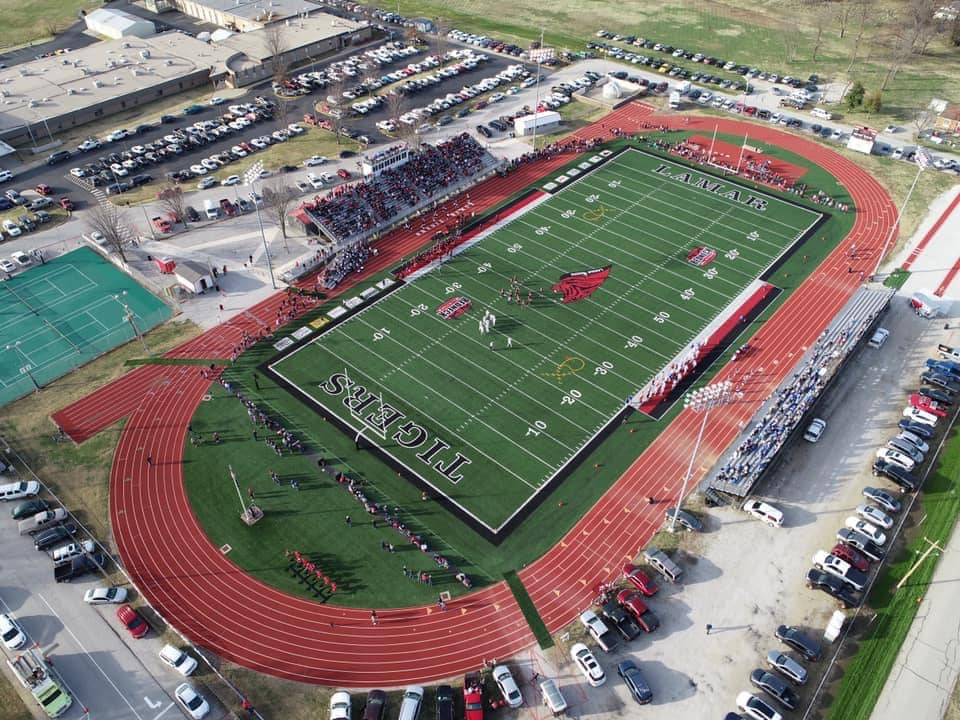
Scott Bailey Field at Thomas M. O'Sullivan Stadium

STATE CHAMPIONSHIPS (CLASS)

=== Football ===
- 2011 (2)
- 2012 (2)
- 2013 (2)
- 2014 (2)
- 2015 (2)
- 2016 (2)
- 2017 (2)
- 2020 (2)
- 2021 (2) (Runner up)
- 2022 (2) (Runner up)
- 2023 (2)
- 2024 (2)

=== Girls Volleyball ===
- 1992 (2) (Fourth)
- 1994 (3) (Fourth)

=== Boys Cross Country ===
- 2012 (2)
- 2016 (2)
- 2017 (2)

=== Boys Track and Field ===
- 1930 (Class B)(Runner up)
- 1978 (2) (Fourth)
- 1983 (2) (Fourth)
- 2012 (2) (Runner up)
- 2013 (2)
- 2014 (2)
- 2015 (3) (Third)
- 2016 (3) (Runner up)
- 2018 (3) (Fourth)
- 2024 (3)

=== Girls Track and Field ===
- 1987 (2) (Third)

=== Boys Golf ===
- 1988 (2) (Runner Up)
- 2013 (2) (Runner Up)
- 2014 (2) (Third)
- 2027 (2)

== Activities ==
Lamar High School also has several activities such as 4H, Scholar Bowl, Speech and Debate, Chess, Bass Fishing, Archery, Marching Band, Concert Band, Show Choir, and Theater.

== Notable alumni ==
- Joe Ihm, Missouri House Representative
- Mike Kelley, Missouri House Representative, 127th District
- Charles A. Lockwood, U.S. Navy Vice Admiral
