= SouthWest Central League =

High school activities conference in southwest Missouri

Southwest Central League
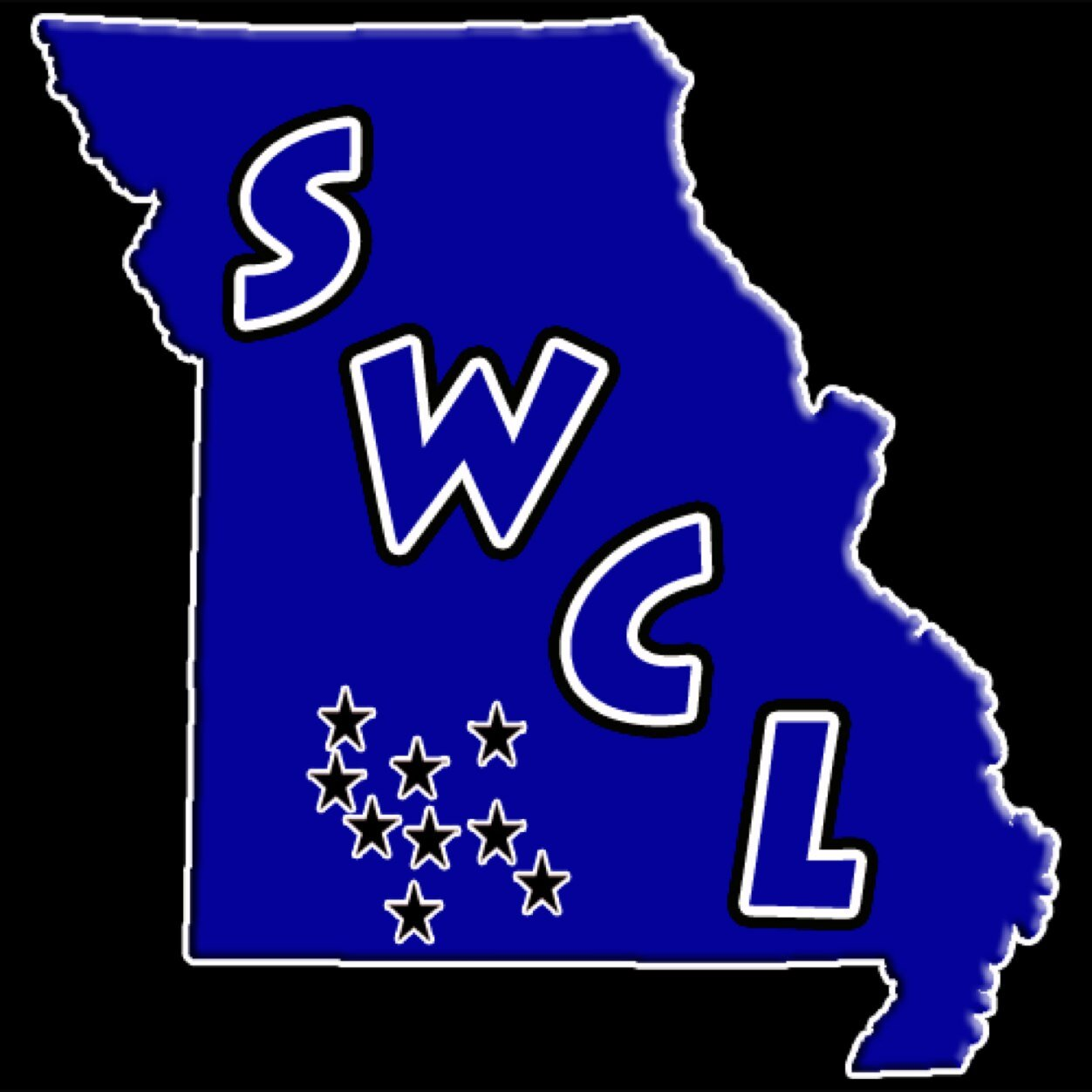
- Association: MSHSAA
- Sports fielded: 9
- No. of teams: 5
- Region: Missouri Ozarks

The Southwest Central League (SWCL) is a high school athletic conference in southwest Missouri. The league is made of five members located in Barry, Stone, and Taney Counties. The SWCL offers men's championships in baseball, basketball, cross country, and golf. Women's championships sponsored are basketball, cross country, softball and volleyball. Member schools also sponsor sideline cheerleading, music competition, and scholar bowl. Junior high level offerings include boys' and girls' basketball, baseball, and volleyball. All member schools are members of Missouri State High School Activities Association.

== Member schools ==
School	Nickname	Colors	City	County	Class	Former Conference	Joined SWCL
Blue Eye High School	Bulldogs		Blue Eye	Stone	2		
Galena High School	Bears		Galena	Stone	2	-	^
Purdy High School	Eagles		Purdy	Barry	2	Ozark 7 Conference	2018-2019
Southwest High School	Trojans		Washburn	Barry	3	Ozark 7 Conference	2018-2019
Kirbyville Middle School	Braves		Kirbyille	Taney	N/A	-	

^Unknown, but records show Galena was a member by 1963.

== Membership changes ==
In December 2017 it was announced that Purdy High School would be leaving the Ozark 7 Conference to accept a "long-standing" invitation to join the Southwest Central League. It was also reported that Southwest R-V Schools would also be leaving the Ozark 7 to join the SWCL. This move was made official in January 2018. Both Purdy and Southwest became full members beginning in the 2018-2019 academic year. The move expanded the Southwest Central League's footprint to include Barry County.

In January 2022, the school board of the Sparta School District voted to accept an invitation to the Summit Conference beginning in the 2023-2024 school year ending a 36 year membership in the SWCL.

In November 2023, seven schools of different conferences came together to form the Greater Ozarks Conference, which would begin in the 2024-2025 school year, three of the seven were members of the SWCL: Billings, Crane, and Spokane.

== Former members ==
School	Nickname	Colors	Class	Conference Joined	Current Conference
Billings High School	Wildcats		2	Greater Ozarks Conference	Greater Ozarks Conference
Clever High School	Blue Jays		3	Mid-Lakes Conference	Mid-Lakes Conference
Crane High School	Pirates		2	Greater Ozarks Conference	Greater Ozarks Conference
Forsyth High School	Panthers		3	Mid-Lakes Conference	Mid-Lakes Conference
Hollister High School	Tigers		3	Central Ozark Conference	Big 8 Conference
Hurley High School	Tigers		1	Unknown	Mark Twain Conference
Reeds Spring High School	Wolves		3	Central Ozark Conference	Big 8 Conference
Sparta High School	Trojans		3	Summit Conference	Summit Conference
Spokane High School	Owls		3	Greater Ozarks Conference	Greater Ozarks Conference
Verona High School	Wildcats		1	Unknown	Ozark 7 Conference

== State championships ==
Year	School	Sport	Place	Class
1990	Billings High School	Baseball	1st	1A
2010	Billings High School	Boys Basketball	1st	2
2011	Crane High School	Boys Basketball	1st	2
2013	Crane High School	Girls Basketball	1st	2
2014	Crane High School	Girls Basketball	1st	2
2015	Crane High School	Girls Basketball	1st	2
2016	Crane High School	Girls Basketball	1st	2
1985	Galena High School	Baseball	1st	1A
2022	Galena High School	Scholar Bowl	3rd	2
1969	Galena High School	Indoor Track & Field	2nd	S
1969	Galena High School	Outdoor Track & Field	2nd	S
2003	Galena High School	Scholar Bowl	3rd	1
2023	Galena High School	Girls Volleyball	4th	1
2019	Blue Eye High School	Girls Cross Country	1st	1
2018	Blue Eye High School	Girls Cross Country	2nd	2
2021	Blue Eye High School	Girls Track & Field	4th	2
2019	Blue Eye High School	Girls Track & Field	1st	1
2021	Blue Eye High School	Boys Cross Country	4th	2
2020	Blue Eye High School	Boys Cross Country	2nd	1
2019	Blue Eye High School	Boys Cross Country	2nd	1
2022	Blue Eye High School	Girls Basketball	3rd	2
2021	Blue Eye High School	Girls Basketball	3rd	2
2020	Blue Eye High School	Girls Basketball	3rd	2
2009	Blue Eye High School	Boys Basketball	4th	3
2018	Purdy High School	Boys Basketball	4th	2
2011	Purdy High School	Girls Basketball	1st	2
1982	Purdy High School	Girls Basketball	2nd	1A
1981	Purdy High School	Girls Basketball	1st	1A
1980	Purdy High School	Girls Basketball	4th	2A
2009	Purdy High School	Scholar Bowl	4th	2
2008	Purdy High School	Scholar Bowl	4th	2
2002	Purdy High School	Scholar Bowl	2nd	2A
2001	Purdy High School	Scholar Bowl	4th	2A
2021	Purdy High School	Softball (Spring)	1st	1
2017	Purdy High School	Softball (Spring)	2nd	1
2004	Purdy High School	Softball (Fall)	4th	2
2003	Purdy High School	Softball (Fall)	2nd	1
1995	Purdy High School	Girls Volleyball	2nd	1A
1994	Purdy High School	Girls Volleyball	2nd	1A
1993	Purdy High School	Girls Volleyball	2nd	1A
1992	Purdy High School	Girls Volleyball	3rd	1A
1989	Purdy High School	Girls Volleyball	3rd	1A
1988	Purdy High School	Girls Volleyball	3rd	1A
1975	Southwest (Washburn) High School	Girls Basketball	4th	A
2002	Southwest (Washburn) High School	Boys Cross Country	3rd	1
2001	Southwest (Washburn) High School	Boys Cross Country	2nd	1A
2000	Southwest (Washburn) High School	Boys Cross Country	1st	1A
1999	Southwest (Washburn) High School	Boys Cross Country	3rd	1A
1994	Southwest (Washburn) High School	Boys Cross Country	4th	1A-2A
1993	Southwest (Washburn) High School	Boys Cross Country	3rd	1A-2A
1992	Southwest (Washburn) High School	Boys Cross Country	4th	1A-2A
1991	Southwest (Washburn) High School	Boys Cross Country	2nd	1A-2A
1989	Southwest (Washburn) High School	Boys Cross Country	4th	1A-2A
1993	Southwest (Washburn) High School	Girls Cross Country	4th	1A-2A

== Individual state champions ==
Year	School	Sport	Athlete	Event	Class
2021	Blue Eye High School	Girls Cross Country	Riley Arnold		2
2020	Blue Eye High School	Girls Cross Country	Riley Arnold		1
2019	Blue Eye High School	Girls Cross Country	Riley Arnold		1
2018	Blue Eye High School	Girls Cross Country	Riley Arnold		1
2019	Blue Eye High School	Girls Cross Country		4x100 M Relay	1
2019	Blue Eye High School	Girls Cross Country		4x200 M Relay	1
2019	Blue Eye High School	Girls Cross Country		4x800 M Relay	1
2007	Galena High School	Boys Golf	Jared Essary		1
2005	Galena High School	Boys Golf	Jared Essary		1
1982	Southwest (Washburn) High School	Speech, Debate & Theatre	Jerry Varner	Humorous Interpretation	
