= Greater Ozarks Conference =

High school athletic and academic conference in southwest Missouri, United States

- Association: MSHSAA
- Founded: 2024
- Region: Southwest Missouri

The Greater Ozarks Conference is a high school activities conference represented by seven private and public schools in the southwest portion of Missouri.

== History ==
The Greater Ozarks Conference was created in 2023 and established in 2024 by the founding schools of: Billings, Crane, Greenwood Laboratory, School, Marion C. Early, New Covenant Academy, Pleasant Hope, and Spokane to begin in the 2024–2025 school year.

Prior to the establishment, four of the founding schools belonged to other conferences.

| School name | Former Conference |
|---|---|
| Billings | SouthWest Central League |
| Crane | SouthWest Central League |
| Spokane | SouthWest Central League |
| New Covenant | Mark Twain Conference |

== Member schools ==
| School name | Mascot | Colors | City | County | School type |
|---|---|---|---|---|---|
| Billings | Wildcats | | Billings | Christian | Public |
| Crane | Pirates | | Crane | Stone | Public |
| Greenwood | Blue Jays | | Springfield | Greene | Laboratory |
| Marion C. Early | Panthers | | Morrisville | Polk | Public |
| New Covenant Academy | Warriors | | Springfield | Greene | Private |
| Pleasant Hope | Pirates | | Pleasant Hope | Polk | Public |
| Spokane | Owls | | Spokane | Christian | Public |

== See also ==
- List of high school athletic conferences in Missouri
- Announcement of the establishment of the Greater Ozarks Conference
