= Northview Township, Webster County, Missouri =

Township in the American state of Missouri

Coordinates: 37.2703°N 92.9803°W

Northview Township (formerly West Ozark Township) is a township in Webster County, in the U.S. state of Missouri.

West Ozark Township took its name from the Ozark Mountains, while Northview Township takes its name from the unincorporated community of Northview.

The James River and various creeks, including North Carolina Creek and Turnbo Creek, flow through the township.
