= Bengal, Missouri =

Unincorporated community in Missouri, U.S.

Coordinates: 36°54′02″N 93°18′36″W

Bengal was an unincorporated community in Christian County, in the U.S. state of Missouri. It was located along Tory Creek about one mile upstream (south) of Montague along the road to Ponce de Leon which is approximately three miles to the southwest. Spokane was about 2.5 miles to the south-southeast. The location is within South Galloway Township. The elevation of Bengal is 1,243 feet.

== History ==
A post office called Bengal was established in 1897, and remained in operation until 1918. The origin of the name Bengal is obscure.
