= Goff Creek =

Goff Creek may refer to:

- Goff Creek (Missouri), a stream in Missouri
- Goff Creek Lodge, a dude ranch in Yellowstone National Park
