= Railey Creek =

Location
- Country: United States
- State: Missouri
- Region: Ozarks

Physical characteristics
- Source
  - coordinates: 36°44′57″N 93°22′41″W
- Mouth
  - location: James River
  - coordinates: 36°47′44″N 93°27′49″W
  - elevation: 925 ft (282 m)

Railey Creek is a stream in Stone County, Missouri. It is a tributary of the James River which it joins just south of Galena.

The stream source is just northwest of Reeds Spring and the confluence with the James River is just south of Galena. The roughly parallel stream Wilson Run enters the James about one mile to the south. The Missouri Pacific Railroad line follows the course of the stream between Reeds Spring and Galena.

Railey Creek has the name of Ben Railey, a pioneer citizen.

== See also ==
- List of rivers of Missouri
