= Pine Run =

Pine Run may refer to:

- Pine Run Elementary School, Bucks County, Pennsylvania, a school in the Central Bucks School District
- Pine Run, Michigan
- Pine Run, Pennsylvania
- Pine Run (James River), a stream in Stone County, Missouri
- Pine Run (Mill Creek, Neshaminy Creek, Delaware River), a small stream in Northampton Township, Bucks County, Pennsylvania
- Pine Run (North Branch Neshaminy Creek) a stream in Bucks County, Pennsylvania
- Pine Run (South Branch French Creek tributary), a stream in Erie County, Pennsylvania
- Pine Run (Neshannock Creek tributary), a stream in Mercer County, Pennsylvania

== See also ==
- Pine Creek (disambiguation)
