= Sugar Camp Hollow =

Valley in the American state of Missouri

Sugar Camp Hollow is a valley in Stone County in the Ozarks of southwest Missouri.

The headwater of the valley is at 36°54′13″N 93°26′08″W and the confluence with the James River is at 36°53′42″N 93°25′14″W.

Sugar Camp Hollow was so named on account of the sugar processing outpost the valley once contained.
