= Wilson Run (Missouri) =

Stream in the American state of Missouri

Wilson Run Wilson Creek

Location
- Country: United States
- State: Missouri

Physical characteristics
- Source
  - coordinates: 36°44′09″N 93°25′02″W
- Mouth: James River
  - coordinates: 36°47′02″N 93°28′47″W
  - elevation: 919 ft (280 m)

Wilson Run or Wilson Creek is a stream in southern Stone County in the Ozarks of southwest Missouri. It is a tributary of the James River.

The source area for the stream lies just north of Missouri Route 76 and about 1.5 miles southwest of Reeds Spring. Aunts Creek, which flows south into Table Rock Lake is south of Route 76. The stream flows northwest roughly parallel to the concurrent Routes 248, 265 and 413. The stream flows into the James River arm of Table Rock Lake about 1.5 miles south of Galena. The parallel flowing Railey Creek lies to the north of the highway and joins the James about one mile upstream.

The stream was named for one James Wilson, an early trapper/hunter in the area. A nearby school was named Wilson Run School.
