= Carico, Missouri =

Unincorporated community in Stone County, Missouri

Coordinates: 36°47′40″N 93°24′41″W

Carico is an unincorporated community in Stone County, in the U.S. state of Missouri. Carico is located at the junction of Railey Creek and Carico Hollow, approximately 3.5 miles east-southeast of Galena and 6.5 miles northwest of Reeds Spring along the Missouri Pacific Railroad.

== History ==
Circa 1912, a store was built along the railroad tracks in the valley and named Little Chicago. The community produced tomatoes and a canning factory was built adjacent to the railroad. A post office called Carico was established in 1921, and remained in operation until 1928. The community once had a schoolhouse and a grist mill. The origin of the name Carico is obscure.
