= Stan Hitchcock =

American country music singer and TV host (1936–2023)

- Born: Stanley Edward Hitchcock; March 22, 1936; Pleasant Hope, Missouri, U.S.
- Died: January 4, 2023 (aged 86) Gallatin, Tennessee, U.S.
- Genre: Country
- Occupations: Singer; television host; radio host; author

Stanley Edward Hitchcock (March 22, 1936 – January 4, 2023) was an American country music singer, television and radio host, and author.

== Early life and education ==
Hitchcock was born on March 22, 1936, in Pleasant Hope, Missouri. In 1940, the family moved to a farm in Springfield. In his youth, he learned to play the guitar. As a teenager, he appeared regularly on local radio stations, first appearing there at the age of 12. He graduated from Pleasant Hope High School in 1954.

After he finished school, Hitchcock joined the United States Navy in 1954 and was stationed on the USS Bryce Canyon (AD-36) in Long Beach, California, from 1955 to 1957. While on the USS Bryce Canyon, he was the leader of the ship's band, "The Bryce Canyon Troubadours", which played country music. He completed four years of service in the navy, leaving in 1958.

== Career ==
=== Music ===
After the Navy, Hitchcock was discovered by Red Foley and invited to his show. He then began his musical career and signed a contract with Columbia Records.

Hitchcock released his first recordings in 1961, but missed the chart positions. Six years later, he switched labels and became Epic Records' first country music artist. He landed his biggest hit there in 1969 with Honey I'm Home, which reached number 17 on the country charts. After moving to GRT Records, however, he only had minor hits in the early 1970s. After another move to MMI Records in 1978, he reached the charts a few more times, most recently with the single She Sings Amazing Grace, which appeared in 1981.

=== Television and radio ===
Hitchcock is better known for his music publications through his work on radio and television. At a young age he worked as a DJ for various radio stations. In the 1960s he was, among other things, the host of a morning show in Nashville, from 1964 to 1970 he had his own program with the Stan Hitchcock Show. In 1982, Hitchcock was one of the founders of the music television network Country Music Television (CMT).

Hitchcock stayed in Nashville until 1991 and worked for the station from there, including hosting the interview program Heart to Heart. Then, when CMT was bought by Gaylord Entertainment, he returned to Missouri and settled in the small town of Branson near Springfield. There he founded the cable station Americana Television Network, also a music station that specialized primarily in American folk and country music.

In 2009, he published the book Corner of Music Row & Memory Lane, in which he looked back on his 50-year career. He worked for the small television station BlueHighways TV, where he had a show and wrote a daily column for their website. Hitchcock was one of the founders of the station.

== Personal life and death ==
Hitchcock had seven children and lived with his wife Denise on a farm north of Gallatin, Tennessee. Hitchcock died from cancer on January 4, 2023, at the age of 86.

== Discography ==
- Just Call Me Lonesome (1965)
- I'm Easy to Love Epic (1968)
- Softly and Tenderly (1969)
- Honey I,m Home (1970)
- Dixie Belle (1970)
- Country (1973)
- Stan Hitchcock (1982)
