= Jackson Hollow =

Valley in the American state of Missouri

Coordinates: 36.6767291°N 93.4896334°W

Jackson Hollow is a valley in Stone County in the U.S. state of Missouri.

Jackson Hollow has the name of the local Jackson family.
