= Oto, Missouri =

Unincorporated community in Missouri, U.S.

Coordinates: 36°51′31″N 93°27′18″W

Oto is an unincorporated community in Stone County, in the U.S. state of Missouri. The community is located on Crane Creek, approximately four miles north of Galena. Missouri Route AA passes through the community along Oto Ridge to the north of the Crane Creek crossing.

== History ==
A post office called Oto was established in 1877, and remained in operation until 1913. According to tradition, the name "Oto" was chosen on account of its brevity.
