= Browns Spring, Missouri =

Unincorporated community in Missouri, U.S.

Coordinates: 36°58′26″N 93°30′39″W

Browns Spring is an unincorporated community in Stone County, in the U.S. state of Missouri. It is about 7 miles south of Clever and is about 3 miles west of Union City.

== History ==
A post office called Browns Spring was established in 1912, and remained in operation until 1939. The community has the name of a spring near the original town site, which in turn was named after Burton Brown, a pioneer citizen. A variant name is "Brown Springs".
