= Wheeler Branch =

Stream in southwest Missouri, U.S.

Wheeler Branch is a stream in Stone County in the Ozarks of southwest Missouri. It is a tributary of the James River.

The stream headwaters are at 36°51′53″N 93°31′37″W and the confluence with the James River is at 36°50′53″N 93°27′53″W. The source area for the stream lie just east of Elsey and the stream flows east-southeast passing under Missouri Route AA prior to its confluence with the James.

Wheeler Branch has the name of the local Wheeler family.

== See also ==
- List of rivers of Missouri
