= Horse Creek (James River tributary) =

Stream in the American state of Missouri

Horse Creek is a stream in Stone County in the Ozarks of southwest Missouri. It is a tributary of the James River.

The stream headwaters are located at 36°49′35″N 93°23′25″W and the confluence with the James is at 36°49′57″N 93°26′46″W.

Horse Creek was so named on account of the wild horses in the area.

== See also ==
- List of rivers of Missouri
