= Galena High School (Missouri) =

Coordinates: 36.8120°N 93.4723°W

Galena Junior/Senior High School

Location
- 30925 State Highway 413; Galena, Missouri 65656; United States

Information
- Type: Public
- School district: Galena R-II
- Superintendent: Daniel Humble
- Principal: Bob Baker
- Staff: 18.76 (FTE)
- Grades: 7–12
- Enrollment: 222 (2022–2023)
- Student to teacher ratio: 11.83
- Colors: Royal blue and white
- Athletics conference: SouthWest Central League
- Nickname: Bears
- Website: hs.galena.k12.mo.us

Galena High School, home of the Bears, is a public high school located on Missouri Route 413 in Galena, Missouri, the county seat of Stone County, Missouri. Galena High School is a member of the SouthWest Central League and the Missouri State High School Activities Association(MSHSAA), which is the governing body for high school athletics and activities throughout the state.

== Academics ==
Galena High School contains students grade 7–12. Along with the typical core courses students can select from a wide range of studies including: Agriculture, Business, Family and Consumer Sciences, Foreign Language, and Mass Media.

== Organizations ==
Galena High School is host to a wide range of organizations and activities for students. GHS is home to local chapters of the National FFA Organization, Future Business Leaders of America, the National Beta Club, Future Teachers of America. Galena also offers both Student council and class leadership positions, including class officers and Prom Committee.

== Athletics and activities ==
Galena High School offers a variety of athletic opportunities for students. Men's sports include: Fall and Spring Season Baseball, Basketball, Golf, and Cross Country. Women's sports include Basketball, Softball, Cross Country, and Volleyball. Other Activities include Cheerleading, Archery, Scholar Bowl, and Fishing. Galena High School is a member of the SouthWest Central League and the Missouri State High School Activities Association.

=== Hancock Gymnasium ===
In 2013 Galena High School Alumnus, Leland Hancock, returned to his hometown and donated $1 million to help the school remodel and expand the gymnasium. During the expansion the seating capacity nearly doubled, new chair-back seats and updated bleacher seating replaced the old wooden bleachers, the roof was raised for a higher minimum clearance, and the a new floor and backboards were installed. In 2016 Galena also opened a newly constructed locker room and weight room complex attached to Hancock Gymnasium. This part of the facility also doubles as a storm shelter for the students and staff. The facility was dedicated at Homecoming 2013 as the Hancock Gymnasium.
