= McCord Bend, Missouri =

- Village
- Location of McCord Bend, Missouri
- Coordinates: 36°47′15″N 93°30′12″W
- Country: United States
- State: Missouri
- County: Stone

Area
  - Total: 0.32 sq mi (0.84 km^{2})
  - Land: 0.29 sq mi (0.76 km^{2})
  - Water: 0.031 sq mi (0.08 km^{2})
- Elevation: 997 ft (304 m)

Population (2020)
  - Total: 212
  - Density: 723.2/sq mi (279.23/km^{2})
- Time zone: UTC-6 (Central (CST))
  - Summer (DST): UTC-5 (CDT)
- ZIP code: 65656
- Area code: 417
- FIPS code: 29-44829
- GNIS feature ID: 2399291

McCord Bend is a village in Stone County, Missouri, United States. The population was 212 at the 2020 census. It is part of the Branson, Missouri Micropolitan Statistical Area.

== Geography ==
McCord Bend is located on a sharp bend on the James River approximately 2.5 miles southwest of Galena.

According to the United States Census Bureau, the village has a total area of 0.32 square miles (0.83 km^{2}), of which 0.29 square miles (0.75 km^{2}) is land and 0.03 square miles (0.08 km^{2}) is water.

== Demographics ==
Historical population
Census	Pop.	Note	%±
2000	292		—
2010	297		1.7%
2020	212		−28.6%
U.S. Decennial Census

=== 2010 census ===
As of the census of 2010, there were 297 people, 114 households, and 78 families living in the village. The population density was 1,024.1 inhabitants per square mile (395.4/km^{2}). There were 155 housing units at an average density of 534.5 per square mile (206.4/km^{2}). The racial makeup of the village was 96.0% White, 0.3% African American, 0.7% Native American, 0.3% Asian, and 2.7% from two or more races. Hispanic or Latino of any race were 2.7% of the population.

There were 114 households, of which 31.6% had children under the age of 18 living with them, 53.5% were married couples living together, 11.4% had a female householder with no husband present, 3.5% had a male householder with no wife present, and 31.6% were non-families. 27.2% of all households were made up of individuals, and 9.7% had someone living alone who was 65 years of age or older. The average household size was 2.61 and the average family size was 3.19.

The median age in the village was 41.3 years. 24.2% of residents were under the age of 18; 8.9% were between the ages of 18 and 24; 21.7% were from 25 to 44; 28.9% were from 45 to 64; and 16.5% were 65 years of age or older. The gender makeup of the village was 48.8% male and 51.2% female.

=== 2000 census ===
As of the census of 2000, there were 292 people, 115 households, and 84 families living in the village. The population density was 1,033.0 inhabitants per square mile (398.8/km^{2}). There were 155 housing units at an average density of 548.3 per square mile (211.7/km^{2}). The racial makeup of the village was 96.92% White, 1.03% Native American, 0.34% Asian, and 1.71% from two or more races. Hispanic or Latino of any race were 1.03% of the population.

There were 115 households, out of which 27.0% had children under the age of 18 living with them, 57.4% were married couples living together, 13.9% had a female householder with no husband present, and 26.1% were non-families. 21.7% of all households were made up of individuals, and 11.3% had someone living alone who was 65 years of age or older. The average household size was 2.54 and the average family size was 2.94.

In the village, the population was spread out, with 24.7% under the age of 18, 7.2% from 18 to 24, 24.3% from 25 to 44, 26.4% from 45 to 64, and 17.5% who were 65 years of age or older. The median age was 40 years. For every 100 females, there were 102.8 males. For every 100 females age 18 and over, there were 93.0 males.

The median income for a household in the village was $27,143, and the median income for a family was $28,750. Males had a median income of $25,625 versus $17,500 for females. The per capita income for the village was $11,703. About 24.7% of families and 25.5% of the population were below the poverty line, including 46.8% of those under the age of eighteen and 8.9% of those 65 or over.

== Education ==
It is in the Galena R-II School District..
