= Crane Creek (James River tributary) =

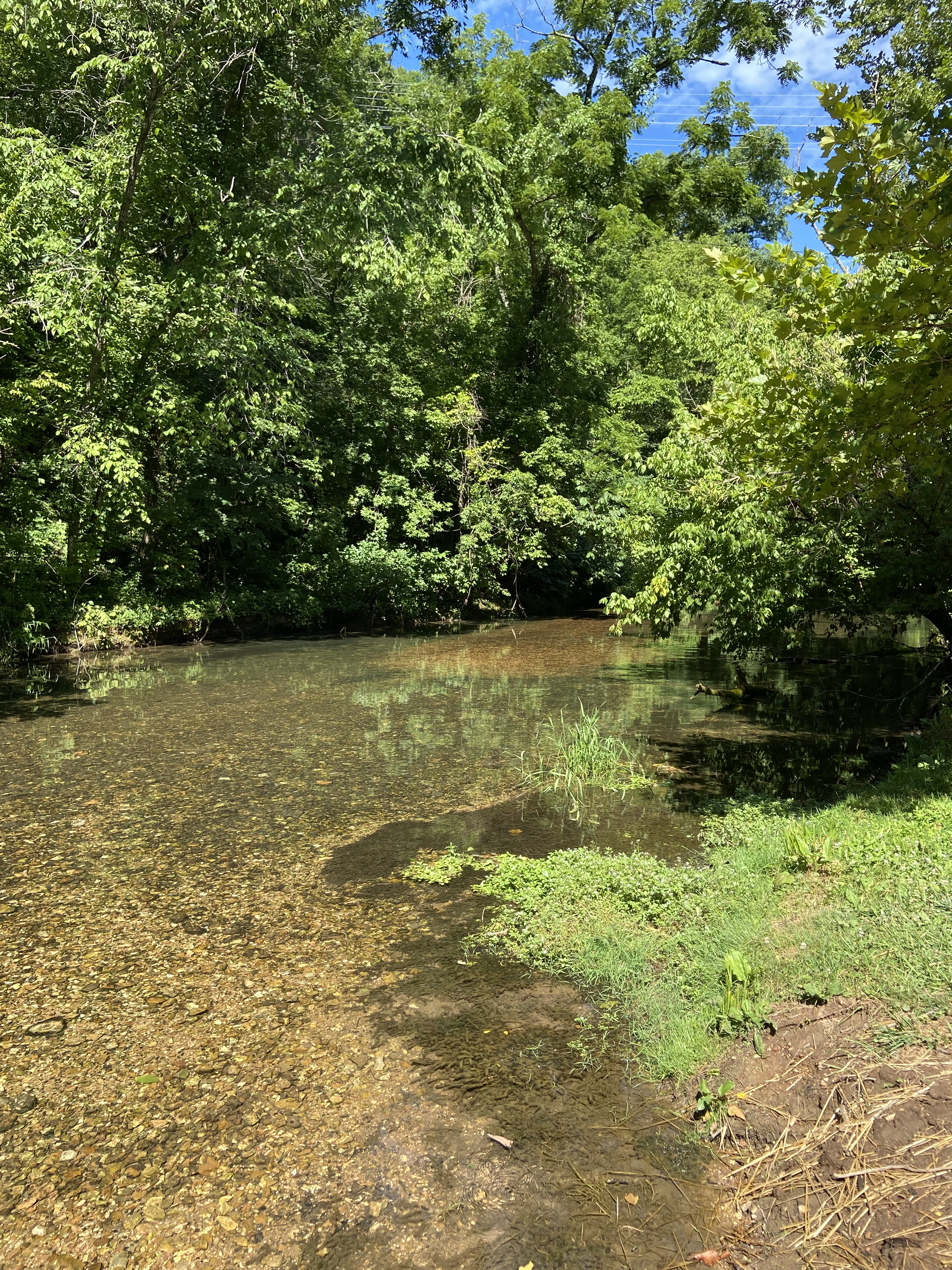
- Image of Crane Creek

Location
- Country: United States
- State: Missouri
- Region: Lawrence and Stone counties

Physical characteristics
- Source
  - location: Lawrence County
  - coordinates: 36°58′25″N 93°38′09″W
  - elevation: 1,410 ft (430 m)
- Mouth
  - location: Stone County
  - coordinates: 36°50′46″N 93°26′55″W
  - elevation: 958 ft (292 m)

Basin features
- Tributaries
  - left: McCord Branch, Dry Crane Creek

Crane Creek is a 23.2-mile-long (37.3 km) stream that flows through the town of Crane. The creek, a tributary of the James River and part of the White River drainage basin, is a part of the Missouri Department of Conservation's trout management program and is classified as a Blue Ribbon Trout Area.

The stream headwaters are about one mile south of Marionville and four miles east of Aurora. The stream flows south and turns east to southeast near the community of Bonham where it gains the tributary of Hemphill Branch. The stream enters Stone County and flows past the southwest side of Crane and passes under Missouri Route 13. The stream turns east and flows past the community of Quail and south of Hurley where it turns to the southeast and undergoes several sharp meanders before entering the James about 2.5 miles north of Galena.

Crane Creek was so named on account of blue cranes in the area.

== See also ==
- List of rivers of Missouri
