= Dry Crane Creek =

Stream in the American state of Missouri

Dry Crane Creek is a stream in Christian and Stone counties in the Ozarks of southwest Missouri. Dry Crane Creek is a tributary of Crane Creek.

The headwaters are located at 37°01′13″N 93°28′30″W and the confluence with Crane Creek is at 36°52′33″N 93°27′28″W.

The stream was so named because it often runs dry.

== See also ==
- List of rivers of Missouri
