= Woolly Creek =

Stream in southwest Missouri, U.S.

Woolly Creek is a stream in Barry and Stone counties in the Ozarks of southwest Missouri.

The stream headwaters are at 36°42′36″N 93°36′43″W and the confluence with the James River arm of Table Rock Lake is at 36°42′20″N 93°32′20″W.

A variant name was "Wooley Creek". The creek has the name of Anderson Wooley, a pioneer settler.

== See also ==
- List of rivers of Missouri
