= Goff Creek (Missouri) =

Stream in the American state of Missouri

Goff Creek is a stream in Stone County in the Ozarks of southwest Missouri. It is a tributary of the James River.

The headwaters are the junction of the East Prong Goff Creek and West Prong Goff Creek at 36°52′30″N 93°23′40″W and the confluence with the James is at 36°53′12″N 93°24′24″W. The East Prong flows past Ponce de Leon and the West Prong flows north from Abesville on Missouri Route 176. The two converge and flow northwest under Missouri Route V and past White City on to join the James just south of the McCall Bridge.

Goff Creek has the name of John Goff, a pioneer settler.

== See also ==
- List of rivers of Missouri
