= Aunts Creek =

Location
- Country: United States
- State: Missouri

Physical characteristics
- Source
  - coordinates: 36°42′53″N 93°22′29″W
- Mouth
  - location: Table Rock Lake
  - coordinates: 36°41′52″N 93°26′33″W
  - elevation: 935 ft (285 m)

Aunts Creek is a stream in Stone County in the Ozarks of southwest Missouri. Alternate names include Ance Creek and Ants Creek.

The source area for the stream lies just west of Missouri Route 76 north of Lakeview. The stream flows west-southwest and then southwest to enter the Aunts Creek arm of Table Rock Lake at Aunts Creek Park on Missouri Route DD northwest of Kimberling City. The headwaters of Wilson Run lie just north of Route 76 and Aunts Creek.

Aunts Creek has the name of "Aunt" China Bowman, a pioneer citizen.

== See also ==
- List of rivers of Missouri
