= Bland Hollow =

Valley in the American state of Missouri

Coordinates: 36.9153354°N 93.4968596°W

Bland Hollow is a valley in Stone County in the U.S. state of Missouri.

Bland Hollow has the name of Hiram Bland, a pioneer settler.
