= Stillhouse Hollow =

Valley in the American state of Missouri

Coordinates: 36.601175°N 93.431575°W

Stillhouse Hollow is a valley in Stone County in the U.S. state of Missouri.

Stillhouse Hollow was so named on account of a stillhouse the valley once contained.
