= John Hollow =

Valley in Missouri, United States

- Location within Missouri
- Floor elevation: 297 m (974 ft)

Geography
- Location: Missouri, United States
- Coordinates: 36°49′25″N 93°23′10″W
- Interactive map of John Hollow

John Hollow is a valley in Stone County in the U.S. state of Missouri.

John Hollow has the name of John Davis, a pioneer citizen.
