= White City, Missouri =

Human settlement in Missouri, United States

Coordinates: 36°52′49″N 93°23′53″W

White City is an unincorporated community in east central Stone County, Missouri, United States. White City is located on Missouri Route V, approximately 2.5 miles west of Ponce de Leon. The community is located on Goff Creek, about one half mile southeast of that stream's confluence with the James River.
