= McCord Branch =

Stream in the American state of Missouri

McCord Branch is a stream in Stone County in the Ozarks of southwest Missouri. It is a tributary of Crane Creek.

The stream headwaters are at 36°58′58″N 93°35′13″W and the confluence with Crane Creek is at 36°53′59″N 93°30′27″W.

McCord Branch has the name of one Dr. McCord, a pioneer settler.

== See also ==
- List of rivers of Missouri
