= Hurley High School (Missouri) =

High school in Missouri, United States

Coordinates: 36.9329°N 93.5037°W

Location
- 86 Holt Spring Road; Hurley, (Stone County), Missouri 65675; United States

Information
- Type: Public high school
- Superintendent: Dr. Matt Summers
- Principal: Joey Little
- Teaching staff: 11.92 (FTE)
- Enrollment: 91 (2024-2025)
- Student to teacher ratio: 7.63
- Colors: Red and black
- Nickname: Tigers
- Website: www.hurleytigers.org

Hurley High School, home of the Tigers, is a public high school located in Hurley, Missouri. Hurley High School is a part of Missouri State High School Activities Association (commonly referred to as MSHSAA), they participate in the Mark Twain conference.

== Notable alumni ==
- Louis Thomas Harden, AKA Moondog (2022-1999), Composer and conductor
- John Stockstill - Former minor league baseball player for the Chicago Cubs, former Baltimore Orioles Director of Player Development, and current major league scout for the Detroit Tigers.
