= Hilton Hollow =

Valley in Missouri, U.S.

Coordinates: 36.8867253°N 93.5563053°W

Hilton Hollow is a valley in Stone County in the U.S. state of Missouri.

Hilton Hollow has the name of the local Hilton family.
