= Gans Creek Recreation Area =

Park in Columbia, Missouri, United States

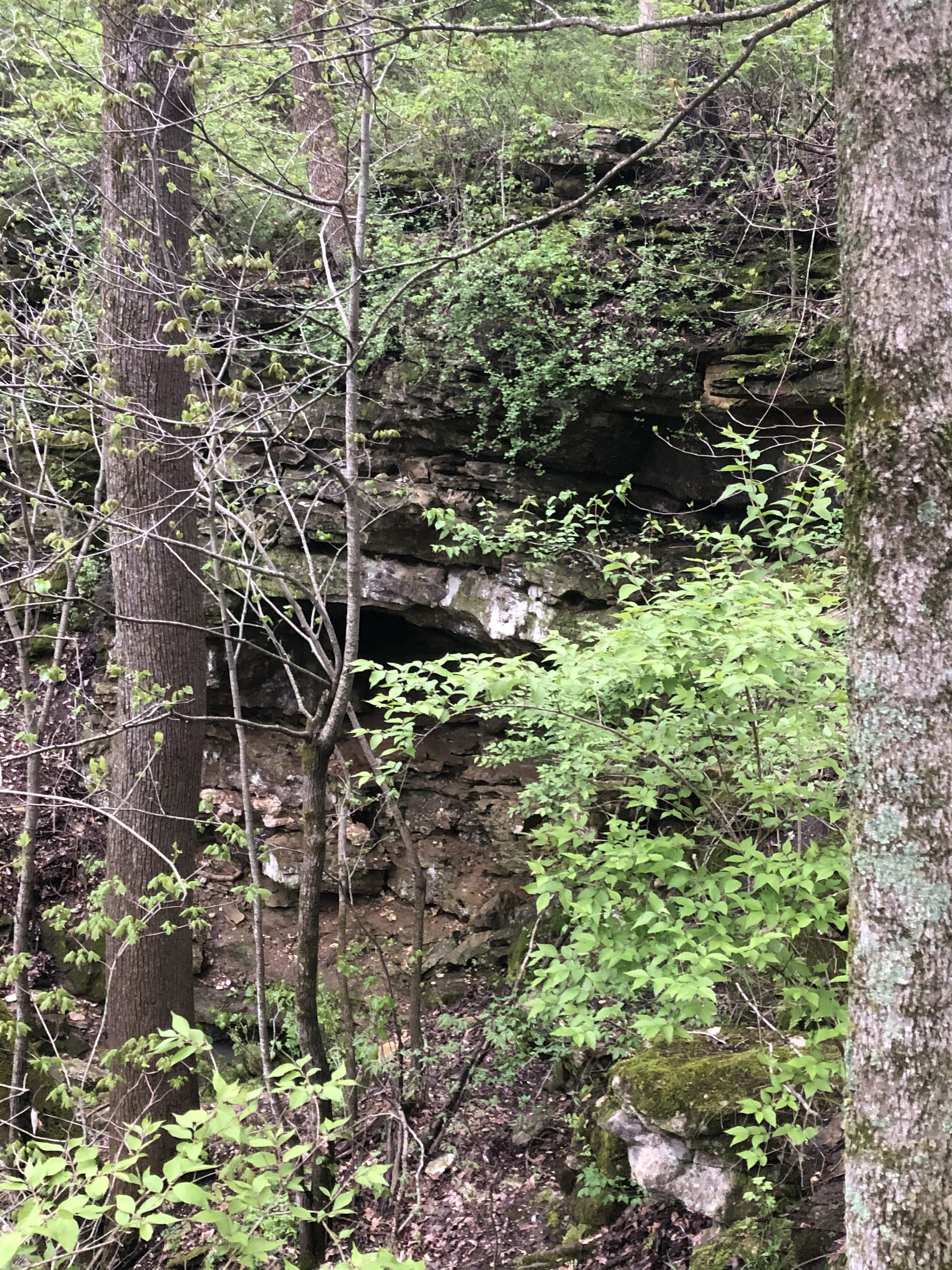
- Elbow Cave

- Location within Missouri Location within the United States
- Nearest city: Columbia, Missouri
- Coordinates: 38°53′27″N 92°17′13″W
- Area: 320 acres (130 ha)
- Operator: Columbia Parks and Recreation

The Gans Creek Recreation Area is a 320-acre public park in Columbia, Missouri, United States. Its name derives from Gans Creek, which flows through the property. It borders the Rock Bridge Memorial State Park on its western edge. The park is owned by the City of Columbia and operated by the Columbia Department of Parks and Recreation.

== History ==
The Gans Creek Recreation Area was acquired by the City of Columbia on September 14, 2007 for $8 million. It was named on July 21, 2008. The area purchased was forest and former pasture land, including a home. The limestone bedrock has formed karst topography, most notably Elbow Cave.

On October 7, 2013, the city council of Columbia approved the development of 50-acres to build a park on the property. On May 3, 2010 the city council approved a plan to build seven multipurpose fields, athletic fields for baseball and softball, a dog park, and a playground, along with other amenities. By 2016, only five multipurpose fields had been constructed. Talks of building a cross country complex within Columbia occurred in the 2000s and the Gans Creek Recreation Area was selected as the site. Construction of the complex began in 2018.

== Activities ==
=== Cross country ===
The Gans Creek Recreation Area holds the Gans Creek Cross Country Course. It features a 500-meter straightaway at the start and two different sized loops, one 2 km and the other 3 km. The University of Missouri uses the track as its home cross country course.

==== Championships ====
The Missouri State High School Activities Association (MSHSAA), chose to move its cross country state championship meet to Gans Creek beginning in 2019. The high school state course had previously been located at Oak Hills Golf Center, in Jefferson City, since 1982.

The course hosted the 2025 NCAA Division I Cross Country Championships.

=== Other ===
Gans Creek Recreation Area has five multipurpose fields that can be used for soccer, lacrosse, or ultimate frisbee.
