= Indian Point, Missouri =

- Village
- Location of Indian Point, Missouri
- Coordinates: 36°38′12″N 93°20′40″W
- Country: United States
- State: Missouri
- County: Stone

Area
  - Total: 3.90 sq mi (10.11 km^{2})
  - Land: 2.80 sq mi (7.25 km^{2})
  - Water: 1.10 sq mi (2.86 km^{2})
- Elevation: 1,083 ft (330 m)

Population (2020)
  - Total: 550
  - Density: 196.6/sq mi (75.89/km^{2})
- Time zone: UTC-6 (Central (CST))
  - Summer (DST): UTC-5 (CDT)
- FIPS code: 29-35186
- GNIS feature ID: 2398572
- Website: indianpoint-mo.gov

Indian Point is a village in Stone County, Missouri, United States. The population was 550 at the 2020 census. It is part of the Branson, Missouri Micropolitan Statistical Area.

== Geography ==
According to the United States Census Bureau, the village has a total area of 3.91 square miles (10.13 km^{2}), of which 2.81 square miles (7.28 km^{2}) is land and 1.10 square miles (2.85 km^{2}) is water.

Indian Point is home to a popular theme park, "Silver Dollar City", and numerous resorts serving the Branson area.

== Demographics ==
Historical population
Census	Pop.	Note	%±
1990	435		—
2000	588		35.2%
2010	528		−10.2%
2020	550		4.2%
U.S. Decennial Census

=== 2010 census ===
As of the census of 2010, there were 528 people, 243 households, and 159 families residing in the village. The population density was 187.9 inhabitants per square mile (72.5/km^{2}). There were 716 housing units at an average density of 254.8 per square mile (98.4/km^{2}). The racial makeup of the village was 96.4% White, 1.3% Native American, 0.2% Asian, 0.6% from other races, and 1.5% from two or more races. Hispanic or Latino of any race were 2.1% of the population.

There were 243 households, of which 16.9% had children under the age of 18 living with them, 56.8% were married couples living together, 5.3% had a female householder with no husband present, 3.3% had a male householder with no wife present, and 34.6% were non-families. 25.9% of all households were made up of individuals, and 11.6% had someone living alone who was 65 years of age or older. The average household size was 2.17 and the average family size was 2.60.

The median age in the village was 56 years. 12.9% of residents were under the age of 18; 4.7% were between the ages of 18 and 24; 15.3% were from 25 to 44; 37.5% were from 45 to 64; and 29.5% were 65 years of age or older. The gender makeup of the village was 52.3% male and 47.7% female.

=== 2000 census ===
As of the census of 2000, there were 588 people, 253 households, and 193 families residing in the village. The population density was 210.5 inhabitants per square mile (81.3/km^{2}). There were 463 housing units at an average density of 165.7 per square mile (64.0/km^{2}). The racial makeup of the village was 99.32% White, 0.17% Native American, 0.17% Asian, and 0.34% from two or more races. Hispanic or Latino persons of any race were 2.38% of the population.

There were 253 households, out of which 20.9% had children under the age of 18 living with them, 64.8% were married couples living together, 9.1% had a female householder with no husband present, and 23.7% were non-families. 18.6% of all households were made up of individuals, and 7.5% had someone living alone who was 65 years of age or older. The average household size was 2.32 and the average family size was 2.61.

In the village, the population was spread out, with 17.2% under the age of 18, 8.8% from 18 to 24, 23.6% from 25 to 44, 32.7% from 45 to 64, and 17.7% who were 65 years of age or older. The median age was 45 years. For every 100 females, there were 90.9 males. For every 100 females age 18 and over, there were 86.6 males.

The median income for a household in the village was $37,727, and the median income for a family was $42,250. Males had a median income of $31,429 versus $20,156 for females. The per capita income for the village was $18,987. About 2.2% of families and 5.9% of the population were below the poverty line, including none of those under age 18 and 2.1% of those age 65 or over.

== Campground ==
Indian Point is a campground on the White River Arm of Table Rock Lake in the mountainous Missouri countryside.

Table Rock Lake is a body of water surrounded by a forest of oak and hickory trees. Its waters wind down through the valleys and hollows of the Ozark Mountains, from Branson, Missouri to Eureka Springs, Arkansas.

Originally built for flood control, the Table Rock Dam has created a lake that has 779 miles of shoreline.

Recreational activities at the park include swimming, scuba diving, boating, fishing, hunting, hiking and wildlife viewing.

=== Nearby attractions ===
Indian Point Campground is about 8 miles (13 km) from Branson, Missouri.

== Education ==
It is in the Reeds Spring R-IV School District..
