= Teague Creek =

Stream in the American state of Missouri

Coordinates: 37°13′53″N 92°51′20″W

Teague Creek is a stream in Webster County in the Ozarks of southern Missouri. It is a tributary of the James River. The stream headwaters are at and its confluence with the James is at .

Teague Creek has the name of the local Teague family who settled in the area around 1845.

== See also ==
- List of rivers of Missouri
