= Hurley, Missouri =

- City
- Location of Hurley, Missouri
- Coordinates: 36°55′53″N 93°29′57″W
- Country: United States
- State: Missouri
- County: Stone

Area
  - Total: 0.43 sq mi (1.11 km^{2})
  - Land: 0.43 sq mi (1.11 km^{2})
  - Water: 0 sq mi (0.00 km^{2})
- Elevation: 1,086 ft (331 m)

Population (2020)
  - Total: 176
  - Density: 411.8/sq mi (158.99/km^{2})
- Time zone: UTC-6 (Central (CST))
  - Summer (DST): UTC-5 (CDT)
- ZIP code: 65675
- Area code: 417
- FIPS code: 29-33922

Hurley (formerly, Spring Creek Mill) is a city in Stone County, Missouri, United States. The population was 176 at the 2020 census. It is part of the Branson, Missouri Micropolitan Statistical Area.

== History ==
A post office called Hurley has been in operation since 1898. The name "Hurley" was assigned by postal officials.

== Geography ==
The community is in northern Stone County at the intersection of routes A and CC. Crane lies four miles to the southwest.

According to the United States Census Bureau, the city has a total area of 0.45 square miles (1.17 km^{2}), all land.

== Demographics ==
Historical population
Census	Pop.	Note	%±
1960	117		—
1970	148		26.5%
1980	125		−15.5%
1990	87		−30.4%
2000	157		80.5%
2010	178		13.4%
2020	176		−1.1%
U.S. Decennial Census

=== 2010 census ===
As of the census of 2010, there were 178 people, 67 households, and 47 families living in the city. The population density was 395.6 inhabitants per square mile (152.7/km^{2}). There were 79 housing units at an average density of 175.6 per square mile (67.8/km^{2}). The racial makeup of the city was 98.9% White, 0.6% Native American, and 0.6% from two or more races.

There were 67 households, of which 38.8% had children under the age of 18 living with them, 56.7% were married couples living together, 6.0% had a female householder with no husband present, 7.5% had a male householder with no wife present, and 29.9% were non-families. 23.9% of all households were made up of individuals, and 6% had someone living alone who was 65 years of age or older. The average household size was 2.66 and the average family size was 3.19.

The median age in the city was 36.5 years. 27.5% of residents were under the age of 18; 11.4% were between the ages of 18 and 24; 21.8% were from 25 to 44; 29.8% were from 45 to 64; and 9.6% were 65 years of age or older. The gender makeup of the city was 55.6% male and 44.4% female.

=== 2000 census ===
As of the census of 2000, there were 157 people, 59 households, and 44 families living in the city. The population density was 472.1 inhabitants per square mile (182.3/km^{2}). There were 63 housing units at an average density of 189.4 per square mile (73.1/km^{2}). The racial makeup of the city was 98.09% White, 0.64% Native American, and 1.27% from two or more races.

There were 59 households, out of which 45.8% had children under the age of 18 living with them, 55.9% were married couples living together, 13.6% had a female householder with no husband present, and 25.4% were non-families. 25.4% of all households were made up of individuals, and 18.6% had someone living alone who was 65 years of age or older. The average household size was 2.66 and the average family size was 3.16.

In the city the population was spread out, with 34.4% under the age of 18, 9.6% from 18 to 24, 24.8% from 25 to 44, 15.9% from 45 to 64, and 15.3% who were 65 years of age or older. The median age was 29 years. For every 100 females, there were 84.7 males. For every 100 females age 18 and over, there were 94.3 males.

The median income for a household in the city was $30,833, and the median income for a family was $32,857. Males had a median income of $24,250 versus $13,750 for females. The per capita income for the city was $13,644. About 15.9% of families and 21.9% of the population were below the poverty line, including 23.4% of those under the age of eighteen and 44.4% of those 65 or over.

== Schools ==
Hurley High School
