= Lake Springfield (Missouri) =

Reservoir in Springfield, Missouri, United States

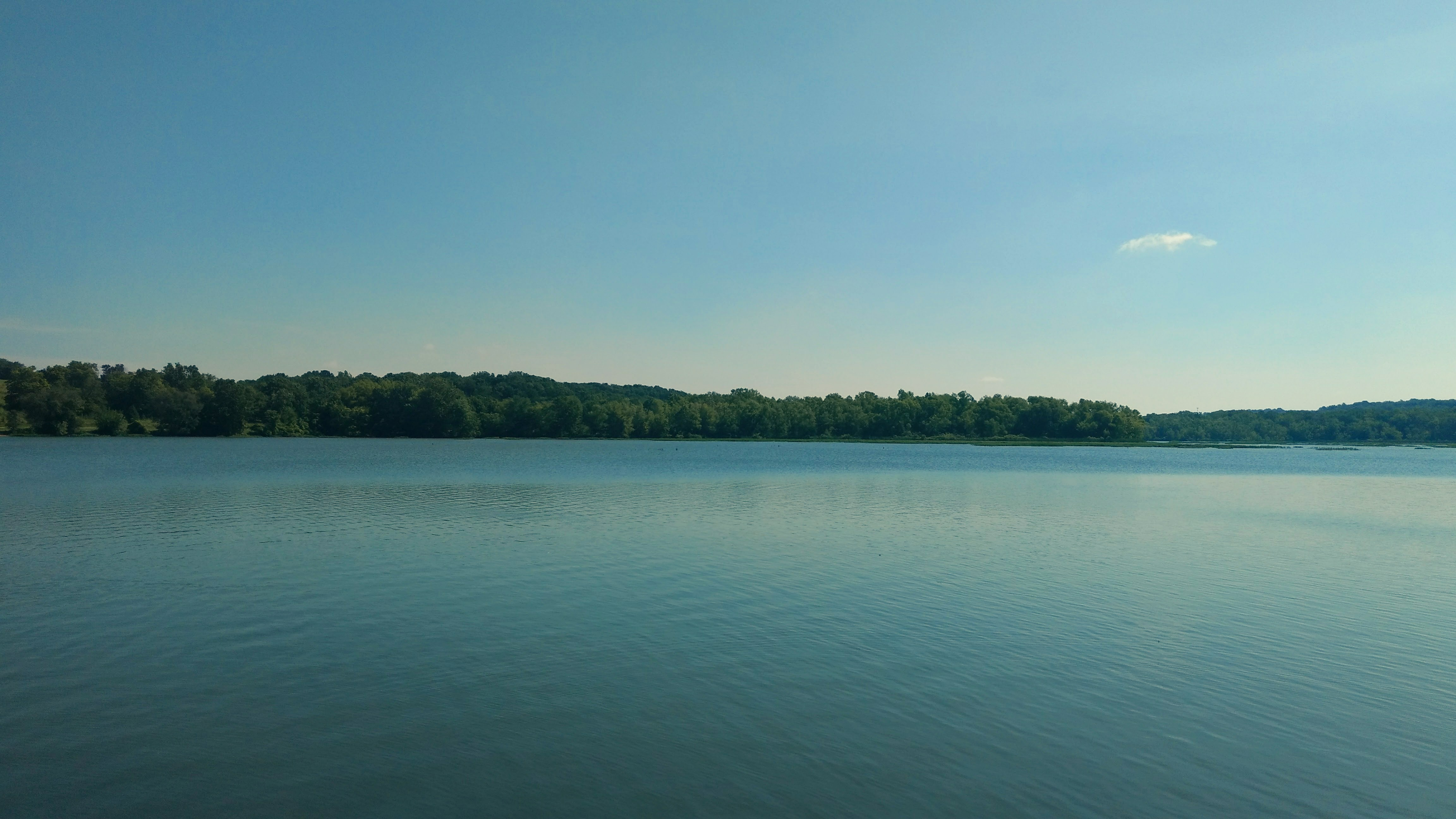

- Location within Missouri Location within the United States
- Location: Springfield, Missouri
- Coordinates: 37°06′42″N 93°15′49″W
- Type: Reservoir
- Primary inflows: James River
- Primary outflows: James River
- Basin countries: United States
- Managing agency: City Utilities of Springfield
- Surface area: 318 acres (129 ha)
- Surface elevation: 1,142 feet (348 m)

Lake Springfield is a 318-acre (129 ha) artificial cooling lake in Springfield, Missouri, United States, that was created for the James River Power Plant. It was built by placing a dam on the James River. It now serves as a popular fishing and recreation area. It is one of two sizeable fishing lakes near the city of Springfield, the other is Fellows Lake.

== History ==
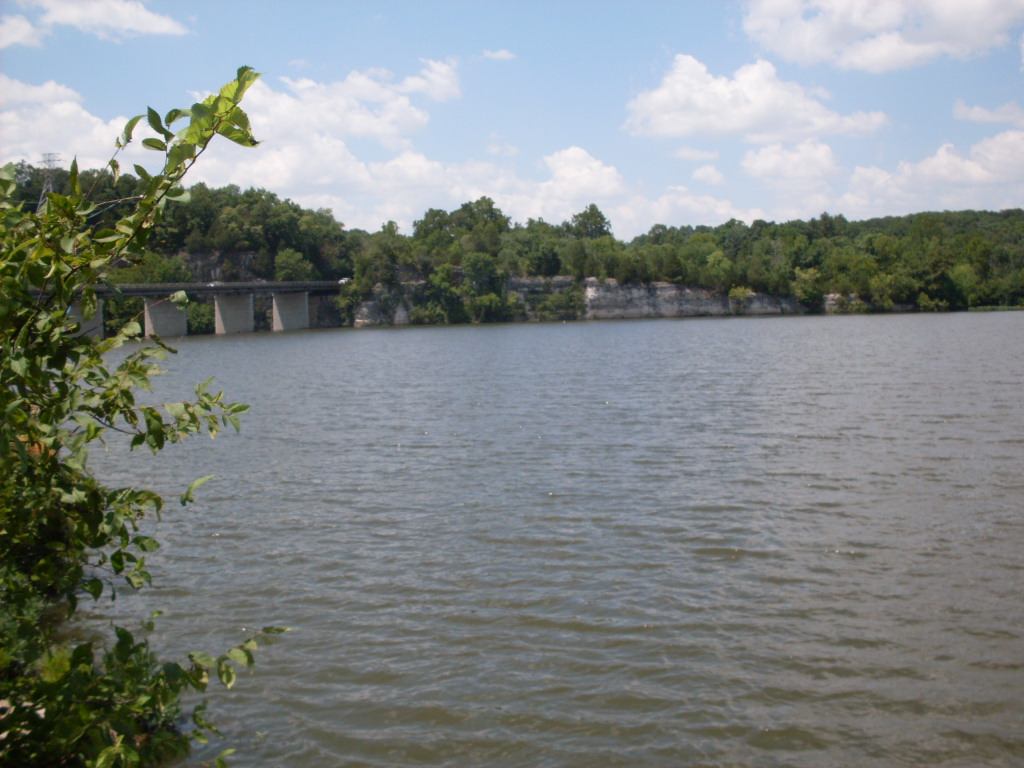
The bluff and roadway above the dam of Lake Springfield taken from the public access and fishing area.

Lake Springfield was created in 1957 with the construction of a dam on the James River. The city of Springfield purchased the land before it was submerged. It cost $11.1 million to buy the land and build the dam to create the lake and first two units of the power station. The lake was to be a cooling reservoir for the James River Power plant. Construction on the first two units of the power plant was started in 1957. Three more units were added to the power plant by 1970.

Water from the lake was used to cool the steam generators. The city used the creation of the lake to create a large recreational area because the area was in close proximity to the city and the area had previously been used by the public for 75 years.

The generators were originally constructed to burn natural gas but the federal Fuel Use Act of 1978 forced it to switch to coal.

In the 1990s, the Missouri Department of Conservation partnered with City Utilities of Springfield to create a boat ramp, fishing dock, and several fishing platforms and lake accesses.

The generator units had a life expectancy of 30 years. In 2015, the power plant was slated to be shut down. The original three generators had already been removed from service to reduce costs. The remaining generator burned natural gas until its closure. The remaining units were demolished in 2022.

== Recreation ==
The lake contains largemouth bass, white crappie, bluegill, redear sunfish, and channel catfish. It is a popular fishing destination for residents of Springfield. Springfield City Utilities limits the size of motor boats to 6-HP because the lake is shallow and large boats would stir up silt. There is a waterfront park with kayaks for rent, fishing docks and fishing jetties.

== See also ==
- List of dams and reservoirs in Missouri
