= Pierson Creek (James River tributary) =

Stream in southwest Missouri, U.S.

Pierson Creek or Pearson Creek is a stream in southeastern Greene County in the Ozarks of southwest Missouri. The stream is a tributary of the James River.

The source area for the stream is about two miles west of Strafford and the stream flows south passing under I-44 then turns to the southwest. The stream enters the eastern portion of Springfield and turns south again as it crosses under Cherry Street. It flows under Missouri Route D and joins the James River about three miles northeast of the U.S. Route 60/U.S. Route 65 interchange of south Springfield.

The stream headwaters are at 37°16′29″N 93°09′25″W and the confluence with the James River is at 37°09′50″N 93°11′48″W. The confluence is at an elevation of 1,155 feet (352 m) and the elevation of the source is approximately 1,438 feet (438 m).

The stream is the location of the type section for the Pierson Limestone as exposed near the Route D crossing.

The stream was named for a mill on the stream which was built by Jerry Pearson in 1828–31. Pearson had acquired rights to the property from the Delaware Indians.
