= Pleasant Hope High School =

Location
- 100 West Cowden Street; Pleasant Hope, (Polk County), Missouri 65725; United States
- Coordinates: 37.46442°N 93.27359°W

Information
- Type: Public high school
- Superintendent: Shaundra Ingram
- Principal: Jered Brown
- Teaching staff: 17.79 (FTE)
- Enrollment: 241 (2023-2024)
- Student to teacher ratio: 13.55
- Colors: Black and gold
- Athletics conference: Greater Ozarks Conference
- Mascot: Pirates
- Accreditation: Missouri Department of Elementary and Secondary Education
- Website: Pleasant Hope R-VI

Pleasant Hope High School is a public high school located in Pleasant Hope, Missouri, USA, a small town about 23 miles north of Springfield, Missouri. The school has roughly 250 students, and is the only high school in the Pleasant Hope R-6 School District, which also provides on-site high school educational services to Good Samaritan Boys Ranch, a residential treatment center in nearby Brighton.
