= Tory Creek (James River tributary) =

Stream in the American state of Missouri

Tory Creek is a stream in Christian and Stone counties of southwest Missouri. It is a tributary of the James River.

The stream headwaters arise just west of U.S. Route 160 1.5 miles north of Spokane. It flows northwest passing the community of Montague and on into Stone County and its confluence with the James River about one mile south of Jamesville and 1.5 miles south of the Finley Creek confluence with the James.

Coordinates of the source in Christian County are 36°53′11″N 93°18′03″W and the confluence with the James River in Stone County is at 36°56′39″N 93°21′31″W. The elevation of the headwaters is about 1340 feet and the confluence is at 1014 feet.

Tory Creek has the name of J. L,. Tory, a pioneer settler.

== See also ==
- List of rivers of Missouri
