= Union City, Missouri =

Unincorporated hamlet in Missouri, U.S.

Coordinates: 36°58′44″N 93°27′57″W

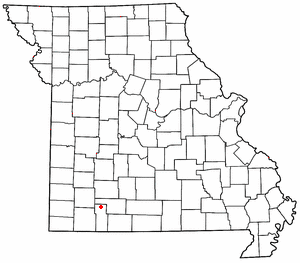

Union City is an unincorporated community in northern Stone County, Missouri, United States. It is located approximately 3.5 miles south of Clever at the intersection of routes M and K. Possum Trot is about two miles to the east on route M.

Union City was a Union Army camp during the Civil War. A small train station was built there (it still stands, but the old railroad itself was removed and converted to a road, Route K, during the Get Missouri Out Of The Mud movement of the 1950s.

The adjacent area to the east of Union City and south of Possum Trot is known as Union Ridge, and a church was built there in 1896. On the day of the church building dedication, several drunk, rowdy young men arrived at the outdoor dinner gathering. For reasons believed to involve a young lady, a knife fight broke out and a number of people were severely injured. As a result, area residents referred to the church as "the Bloody Ridge Baptist Church", a name that stuck for several generations.

South of Union Ridge and east of Union City is Silver Lake, an impoundment that was dammed in 1865 by Davis Kimberling for the purpose of powering a feed and flour mill. It is now a recreational area.
