= Billings High School (Missouri) =

Public high school in Billings, Missouri

Location
- Billings, Missouri; United States
- Coordinates: 37.06008°N 93.55651°W

Information
- Other name: BHS
- Type: Public high school
- Superintendent: Cynthia Brandt
- Principal: Will Darter
- Staff: 16.25 (FTE)
- Grades: 7-12
- Enrollment: 149 (2023-2024)
- Student to teacher ratio: 9.17
- Color(s): Blue and Gold
- Mascot: Wildcats
- Conference: Greater Ozarks Conference
- Association: MSHSAA
- Website: www.billings.k12.mo.us

Billings High School, home of the Wildcats, is a public high school located in Billings, Missouri. Billings High School is a part of MSHSAA which acts as the governing body for high school activities throughout the state of Missouri. They are a founding member of the activities conference, Greater Ozarks Conference.

== Athletics ==
=== Baseball ===
- State Champion—1990

=== Volleyball ===
- 3rd Place (State)—2019
- 4th Place (State)—2018
