= Pine Run (James River tributary) =

Stream in the American state of Missouri

Pine Run (sometimes called Pine Run Creek) is a stream in Stone County, Missouri. It is a tributary of the James River which it joins on the northeast side of Galena. The headwaters are located west of Elsey. Missouri routes 13, 265 and the Missouri Pacific Railroad line follow the Pine Run valley between Elsey and Galena.

The source is located at 36°51′27″N 93°33′08″W and the confluence with the James River is at 36°48′44″N 93°27′59″W.

Pine Run was so named on account of pine timber near its course.

== See also ==
- List of rivers of Missouri
