= Coney Island, Missouri =

- Village
- Location of Coney Island, Missouri
- Coordinates: 36°35′35″N 93°23′48″W
- Country: United States
- State: Missouri
- County: Stone

Area
  - Total: 0.066 sq mi (0.17 km^{2})
  - Land: 0.066 sq mi (0.17 km^{2})
  - Water: 0 sq mi (0.00 km^{2})
- Elevation: 978 ft (298 m)

Population (2020)
  - Total: 47
  - Density: 734.1/sq mi (283.43/km^{2})
- Time zone: UTC-6 (Central (CST))
  - Summer (DST): UTC-5 (CDT)
- FIPS code: 29-16115
- GNIS feature ID: 1669614
- Website: www.villageofconeyislandmo.org

Coney Island is a village in Stone County, Missouri, United States. The population was 47 at the 2020 census. It is part of the Branson, Missouri Micropolitan Statistical Area.

== Geography ==
Coney Island is located at 36°35′35″N 93°23′48″W. According to the United States Census Bureau, the village has a total area of 0.06 square miles (0.16 km^{2}), all land. It is situated on a small peninsula, and is bordered by Table Rock Lake to the north, west and south.

== Demographics ==
Historical population
Census	Pop.	Note	%±
2000	94		—
2010	75		−20.2%
2020	47		−37.3%
U.S. Decennial Census

=== 2010 census ===
As of the census of 2010, there were 75 people, 40 households, and 28 families living in the village. The population density was 1,250.0 inhabitants per square mile (482.6/km^{2}). There were 96 housing units at an average density of 1,600.0 per square mile (617.8/km^{2}). The racial makeup of the village was 97.3% White, 1.3% African American, and 1.3% Native American.

There were 40 households, of which 5.0% had children under the age of 18 living with them, 55.0% were married couples living together, 7.5% had a female householder with no husband present, 7.5% had a male householder with no wife present, and 30.0% were non-families. 27.5% of all households were made up of individuals, and 17.5% had someone living alone who was 65 years of age or older. The average household size was 1.88 and the average family size was 2.14.

The median age in the village was 63.4 years. 4% of residents were under the age of 18; 5.2% were between the ages of 18 and 24; 10.6% were from 25 to 44; 38.7% were from 45 to 64; and 41.3% were 65 years of age or older. The gender makeup of the village was 49.3% male and 50.7% female.

=== 2000 census ===
As of the census of 2000, there were 94 people, 46 households, and 29 families living in the village. The population density was 1,555.7 inhabitants per square mile (600.7/km^{2}). There were 105 housing units at an average density of 1,737.7 per square mile (670.9/km^{2}). The racial makeup of the village was 98.94% White and 1.06% Native American.

There were 46 households, out of which 13.0% had children under the age of 18 living with them, 63.0% were married couples living together, 2.2% had a female householder with no husband present, and 34.8% were non-families. 34.8% of all households were made up of individuals, and 21.7% had someone living alone who was 65 years of age or older. The average household size was 2.04 and the average family size was 2.50.

In the village, the population was spread out, with 12.8% under the age of 18, 3.2% from 18 to 24, 13.8% from 25 to 44, 35.1% from 45 to 64, and 35.1% who were 65 years of age or older. The median age was 56 years. For every 100 females, there were 104.3 males. For every 100 females age 18 and over, there were 95.2 males.

The median income for a household in the village was $27,500, and the median income for a family was $30,000. Males had a median income of $20,625 versus $11,563 for females. The per capita income for the village was $12,204. There were 11.5% of families and 15.5% of the population living below the poverty line, including 28.6% of under eighteens and 7.1% of those over 64.
