= 2025 NCAA Division I Cross Country Championships =

- Edition: 87th–Men; 45th–Women
- Date: November 22, 2025
- Host city: Columbia, Missouri
- Venue: Gans Creek Cross Country Course
- Distances: 10 km–Men; 6 km–Women

The 2025 NCAA Division I Cross Country Championships were the 87th annual NCAA Men's Division I Cross Country Championship and the 45th annual NCAA Women's Division I Cross Country Championship to determine the team and individual national champions of NCAA Division I men's and women's collegiate cross country running in the United States.

These championships were hosted by the University of Missouri at the Gans Creek Cross Country Course in Columbia, Missouri. Missouri was granted the bid in 2021.

In all, four different titles were contested: men's and women's individual and team championships.

== Results ==
=== Women's team ===
| PL | Team | Total Time | Average Time | Score | 1 | 2 | 3 | 4 | 5 | (6) | (7) |
|---|---|---|---|---|---|---|---|---|---|---|---|
| 1st place, gold medalist(s) | NC State | 1:35:53.8 | 19:10.8 | 114 | 5 | 6 | 24 | 35 | 44 | (96) | (122) |
| 2nd place, silver medalist(s) | BYU | 1:35:53.8 | 19:10.8 | 130 | 2 | 4 | 36 | 41 | 47 | (63) | (68) |
| 3rd place, bronze medalist(s) | Oregon | 1:36:34.4 | 19:18.9 | 153 | 9 | 26 | 31 | 34 | 53 | (56) | (146) |
| 4 | New Mexico | 1:37:28.3 | 19:29.7 | 216 | 16 | 38 | 42 | 59 | 61 | (62) | (100) |
| 5 | Florida | 1:37:00.3 | 19:24.1 | 225 | 3 | 15 | 19 | 72 | 116 | (119) | (149) |
| 6 | Stanford | 1:37:56.4 | 19:35.3 | 268 | 25 | 29 | 39 | 85 | 90 | (145) | (204) |
| 7 | Notre Dame | 1:37:53.4 | 19:34.7 | 278 | 10 | 21 | 45 | 94 | 108 | (125) | (159) |
| 8 | Northern Arizona | 1:37:54.1 | 19:34.9 | 279 | 27 | 32 | 33 | 49 | 138 | (162) | (165) |
| 9 | West Virginia | 1:38:05.5 | 19:37.1 | 280 | 12 | 40 | 48 | 79 | 101 | (111) | (195) |
| 10 | Penn State | 1:39:17.6 | 19:51.6 | 406 | 13 | 78 | 95 | 97 | 123 | (143) | (184) |

=== Women's individual ===
| Position | Name | Team | Time |
|---|---|---|---|
| 1st place, gold medalist(s) | (Kenya) Doris Lemngole | Alabama | 18:25.4 |
| 2nd place, silver medalist(s) | (United States) Jane Hedengren | BYU | 18:38.9 |
| 3rd place, bronze medalist(s) | (Kenya) Hilda Olemomoi | Florida | 18:46.4 |
| 4 | (United States) Riley Chamberlain | BYU | 18:47.0 |
| 5 | (New Zealand) Hannah Gapes | NC State | 18:51.3 |
| 6 | (United States) Grace Hartman | NC State | 18:52.6 |
| 7 | (Kenya) Isca Chelangat | Oklahoma State | 18:56.1 |
| 8 | (Sweden) Vera Sjöberg | North Carolina | 18:56.5 |
| 9 | (Turkey) Şilan Ayyıldız | Oregon | 18:57.9 |
| 10 | (United States) Mary Bonner Dalton | Notre Dame | 18:58.0 |

=== Men's team ===
| PL | Team | Total Time | Average Time | Score | 1 | 2 | 3 | 4 | 5 | (6) | (7) |
|---|---|---|---|---|---|---|---|---|---|---|---|
| 1st place, gold medalist(s) | Oklahoma State | 2:23:59.5 | 28:47.9 | 57 | 4 | 5 | 6 | 12 | 30 | (86) | (149) |
| 2nd place, silver medalist(s) | New Mexico | 2:24:16.7 | 28:51.4 | 82 | 1 | 8 | 13 | 18 | 42 | (52) | (104) |
| 3rd place, bronze medalist(s) | Iowa State | 2:25:16.1 | 29:03.3 | 158 | 14 | 20 | 21 | 31 | 72 | (88) | (153) |
| 4 | Syracuse | 2:26:04.1 | 29:12.9 | 212 | 27 | 32 | 39 | 54 | 60 | (83) | (131) |
| 5 | Oregon | 2:26:04.4 | 29:12.9 | 239 | 9 | 22 | 29 | 55 | 124 | (144) | (181) |
| 6 | Alabama | 2:26:19.5 | 29:15.9 | 253 | 11 | 23 | 45 | 76 | 98 | (138) | (160) |
| 7 | Virginia | 2:26:55.2 | 29:23.1 | 303 | 7 | 51 | 67 | 87 | 91 | (103) | (111) |
| 8 | Northern Arizona | 2:26:53.6 | 29:22.8 | 303 | 15 | 53 | 71 | 79 | 85 | (94) | (101) |
| 9 | Eastern Kentucky | 2:26:59.6 | 29:24.0 | 316 | 19 | 26 | 65 | 74 | 132 | (152) | (187) |
| 10 | Colorado | 2:27:12.8 | 29:26.6 | 318 | 49 | 58 | 61 | 73 | 77 | (120) | (151) |

=== Men's individual ===
| Position | Name | Team | Time |
|---|---|---|---|
| 1st place, gold medalist(s) | (Eritrea) Habtom Samuel | New Mexico | 28:33.9 |
| 2nd place, silver medalist(s) | (United States) Rocky Hansen | Wake Forest | 28:38.0 |
| 3rd place, bronze medalist(s) | (Kenya) Solomon Kipchoge | Washington State | 28:40.1 |
| 4 | (Kenya) Brian Musau | Oklahoma State | 28:41.2 |
| 5 | (Morocco) Fouad Messaoudi | Oklahoma State | 28:42.8 |
| 6 | (Kenya) Denis Kipngetich | Oklahoma State | 28:44.3 |
| 7 | (United States) Gary Martin | Virginia | 28:44.3 |
| 8 | (Kenya) Collins Kiprotich | New Mexico | 28:45.7 |
| 9 | (Republic of Ireland) Abdel Laadjel | Oregon | 28:46.2 |
| 10 | (United Kingdom) George Couttie | Virginia Tech | 28:47.4 |

== See also ==
- NCAA Men's Division II Cross Country Championship
- NCAA Women's Division II Cross Country Championship
- NCAA Men's Division III Cross Country Championship
- NCAA Women's Division III Cross Country Championship

== Results ==
- 2025 NCAA Division I Cross Country Championships live results
- 2025 NCAA Division I Cross Country Championships TFRRS results

== ESPN Full Race Broadcast ==
- 2025 NCAA DI women's cross country championship - FULL RACE NCAA.org
- 2025 NCAA DI men's cross country championship - FULL RACE NCAA.org
