= North Carolina Creek =

Stream in the American state of Missouri

North Carolina Creek is a stream in Webster County in the Ozarks of southern Missouri. It is a tributary of the James River.

The stream headwaters are at 37°13′05″N 92°57′17″W and its confluence with the James is at 37°15′01″N 93°01′17″W.

North Carolina Creek, historically called "North Carolina Branch", was named after the state of North Carolina, the native home of a large share of the first settlers.

== See also ==
- List of rivers of Missouri
