= Crane High School (Missouri) =

Public high school in Crane, Missouri

Location
- 209 Pirate Lane; Crane, Missouri; United States; 36.89435°N 93.56985°W

Information
- Type: Public high school
- Established: 1880
- Superintendent: Dr. Kelli Rogers
- NCES School ID: 291029000333
- Principal: Mrs. Tara Mease
- Teaching staff: 21.90 (FTE)
- Grades: 7-12
- Enrollment: 237 (2024–2025)
- Student to teacher ratio: 10.82
- Language: English
- Colors: Royal blue and old gold
- Mascot: Pirates
- Accreditation: Missouri Department of Elementary and Secondary Education
- Communities served: Crane, Elsey, Jenkins
- Conference: Greater Ozarks Conference
- Website: www.crane.k12.mo.us

Crane High School, home of the Pirates, is a public high school located on Missouri Route 413 in Crane, Missouri. Crane High School is a part of MSHSAA which acts as the governing body for high school activities throughout the state of Missouri. They are one of the founding members of the activities conference, Greater Ozarks Conference.

== History ==
Crane's school building was one of the first founding buildings in Crane in the early 1800s. The school district was organized in 1880.

== Extracurricular activities ==
=== Athletics ===
Crane's athletic teams are known as the Pirates and Lady Pirates, and the school colors are blue, gold, and white. As of 2023, Crane fields 11 varsity teams, some of which also compete at the junior varsity level. All sporting events are held on the school's campus, with exception of cross country, track and field, and baseball - the latter being held at the baseball field belonging to the city of Crane. The cross country and track and field teams currently only participate in meets that require them to travel, as Crane does not currently have the facilities to host events for these sports. In 2022, residents residing within the Crane school district voted on a school bond that would allow the school to borrow $1 million for the purpose of building an athletic complex that would include a track. The bond measure successfully passed.

The school is a member of the Missouri State High School Activities Association (MSHSAA).

==== Championships ====
Crane has had several teams enjoy state success. Most notably, the girls basketball team from 2013-2016 won the state championship every year. Two years prior to that however, in 2011, the boys basketball team brought home Crane's first ever state championship.

Crane's baseball team saw success in 1988, 1992-1993 with three state appearances, finishing third, second, and second, respectively.

State championships		State runners-up
Sport	Year(s)	Sport	Year(s)
Boys basketball	2011	Baseball	1992, 1993
Girls basketball	2013, 2014, 2015, 2016
