= Possum Trot, Missouri =

Former town in Missouri, U.S.

Coordinates: 36°58′43″N 93°25′45″W

Possum Trot is a former town in northeastern Stone County, Missouri, United States. It is located approximately 5.5 miles (8.85 km) southwest of Nixa on Missouri Route M. Only the remains of a school named Fairview and a house are left. Fairview was a one-room school which had grades 1 through 8 and was locally called Possum Trot School.

The general store at Possum Trot was operated by the descendants of Jackson B. and Emma Stewart Wilson, William Jasper Wilson, and his brother John Washington Wilson during the early part of the 20th century. Part of the community was once known as Self.

== See also ==
- List of ghost towns in Missouri
