= Goff Creek Lodge =

- U.S. National Register of Historic Places
- U.S. Historic district
- Location within Wyoming Location within the United States
- Location: Park County, Wyoming, USA
- Nearest city: Cody, Wyoming
- Coordinates: 44°27′19″N 109°50′12″W
- Built: 1929
- Architect: Tex Kennedy
- MPS: Dude Ranches along the Yellowstone Highway in the Shoshone National Forest
- NRHP reference No.: 03001108
- Added to NRHP: October 30, 2003

The Goff Creek Lodge is a dude ranch in Shoshone National Forest on the east entrance road to Yellowstone National Park. The ranch was probably established c. 1910 by Tex Kennedy. Built in typical dude ranch style with a rustic log lodge surrounded by cabins, its period of significance extends from 1929 to 1950.
