= Montague, Missouri =

Unincorporated community in Missouri, U.S.

Coordinates: 36°55′41″N 93°19′41″W

Montague is an unincorporated community in western Christian County, in the U.S. state of Missouri. The community is on Tory Creek, west of Highlandville.

== History ==
A post office called Montague was established in 1905, and remained in operation until 1908. The origin of the name Montague is obscure.
