= Pine Run, Pennsylvania =

Unincorporated community in Pennsylvania, US

Pine Run
- Census-designated place
- Location within Pennsylvania Location within the United States
- Coordinates: 40°41′11″N 80°14′22″W
- Country: United States
- State: Pennsylvania
- County: Beaver
- Township: New Sewickley

Area
  - Total: 0.859 sq mi (2.22 km^{2})
- Elevation: 955 ft (291 m)
- Time zone: UTC-4 (EST)
  - Summer (DST): UTC-5 (EDT)
- Area codes: 724, 878
- GNIS feature ID: 2830877

Pine Run is an unincorporated community and census-designated place in the southwest corner of New Sewickley Township, Beaver County, Pennsylvania, located immediately east of Freedom Borough. The community is served by a volunteer fire department.

== Demographics ==
Historical population
Census	Pop.	Note	%±

The United States Census Bureau defined Pine Run as a census designated place (CDP) in 2023.
