= Turnbo Creek =

Stream in the American state of Missouri

Turnbo Creek is a stream in Webster County in the Ozarks of southern Missouri. It is a tributary of the James River. The stream headwaters are at 37°19′52″N 92°53′34″W and its confluence with the James is at 37°16′10″N 92°59′25″W.

Turnbo Creek has the name of the local Turnbo family. A variant name was "Turnbow Creek".

== See also ==
- List of rivers of Missouri
