= Crane, Missouri =

- Town
- Motto: Neatest Little Town in Missouri
- Location of Crane, Missouri
- Coordinates: 36°54′19″N 93°34′18″W
- Country: United States
- State: Missouri
- County: Stone

Government
  - Type: Mayor/Council
  - Mayor: Collin Brannan

Area
  - Total: 1.53 sq mi (3.95 km^{2})
  - Land: 1.52 sq mi (3.94 km^{2})
  - Water: 0.0039 sq mi (0.01 km^{2})
- Elevation: 1,145 ft (349 m)

Population (2020)
  - Total: 1,495
  - Density: 983.3/sq mi (379.64/km^{2})
- Time zone: UTC-6 (Central (CST))
  - Summer (DST): UTC-5 (CDT)
- ZIP code: 65633
- Area code: 417
- FIPS code: 29-17074
- Website: www.crane-mo.com

Crane (formerly Hickory Grove) is a town in Stone County, Missouri, United States. The population was 1,495 at the 2020 census. It is part of the Branson, Missouri Micropolitan Statistical Area.

== History ==
Crane was platted in 1895, taking its name from nearby Crane Creek. A post office called Crane has been in operation since 1887.

== Geography ==
The town is in northwest Stone County, approximately four miles northwest of Elsey along Missouri Route 413, and eleven miles south of Billings, in Christian County. Crane Creek flows through the town.

According to the United States Census Bureau, the city has a total area of 1.52 square miles (3.94 km^{2}), all land.

== Demographics ==
Historical population
Census	Pop.	Note	%±
1910	1,002		—
1920	1,151		14.9%
1930	1,030		−10.5%
1940	1,013		−1.7%
1950	939		−7.3%
1960	954		1.6%
1970	1,003		5.1%
1980	1,185		18.1%
1990	1,218		2.8%
2000	1,390		14.1%
2010	1,462		5.2%
2020	1,495		2.3%
U.S. Decennial Census

=== 2010 census ===
As of the census of 2010, there were 1,462 people, 558 households, and 347 families living in the city. The population density was 961.8 inhabitants per square mile (371.4/km^{2}). There were 663 housing units at an average density of 436.2 per square mile (168.4/km^{2}). The racial makeup of the city was 97.2% White, 0.1% African American, 0.7% Native American, 0.2% Asian, 0.4% from other races, and 1.4% from two or more races. Hispanic or Latino of any race were 1.2% of the population.

There were 558 households, of which 35.1% had children under the age of 18 living with them, 44.6% were married couples living together, 13.3% had a female householder with no husband present, 4.3% had a male householder with no wife present, and 37.8% were non-families. 33.7% of all households were made up of individuals, and 21.5% had someone living alone who was 65 years of age or older. The average household size was 2.43 and the average family size was 3.12.

The median age in the city was 39.9 years. 25.1% of residents were under the age of 18; 7.1% were between the ages of 18 and 24; 24.2% were from 25 to 44; 22.1% were from 45 to 64; and 21.5% were 65 years of age or older. The gender makeup of the city was 46.6% male and 53.4% female.

=== 2000 census ===
As of the census of 2000, there were 1,390 people, 541 households, and 333 families living in the city. The population density was 944.9 inhabitants per square mile (364.8/km^{2}). There were 630 housing units at an average density of 428.3 per square mile (165.4/km^{2}). The racial makeup of the city was 96.62% White, 0.07% African American, 0.36% Native American, 0.07% Asian, 0.07% from other races, and 2.81% from two or more races. Hispanic or Latino of any race were 0.86% of the population.

There were 541 households, out of which 32.2% had children under the age of 18 living with them, 47.0% were married couples living together, 10.7% had a female householder with no husband present, and 38.4% were non-families. 35.7% of all households were made up of individuals, and 23.7% had someone living alone who was 65 years of age or older. The average household size was 2.41 and the average family size was 3.15.

In the city the population was spread out, with 26.7% under the age of 18, 9.1% from 18 to 24, 24.3% from 25 to 44, 18.6% from 45 to 64, and 21.4% who were 65 years of age or older. The median age was 37 years. For every 100 females, there were 87.1 males. For every 100 females age 18 and over, there were 81.3 males.

The median income for a household in the city was $20,848, and the median income for a family was $31,806. Males had a median income of $26,583 versus $18,750 for females. The per capita income for the city was $12,120. About 15.2% of families and 20.8% of the population were below the poverty line, including 21.3% of those under age 18 and 28.0% of those age 65 or over.

== Education ==
Crane R-III School District operates one elementary school and one high school. Crane High School has a variety of activities for students, including archery, baseball, cheerleading, basketball, softball, trap, cross country, track and field, volleyball, as well as scholar bowl and music activities such as band and marching band.

Crane has a public library, a branch of the Stone County Library.
