= James River (Missouri) =

River in Missouri, United States

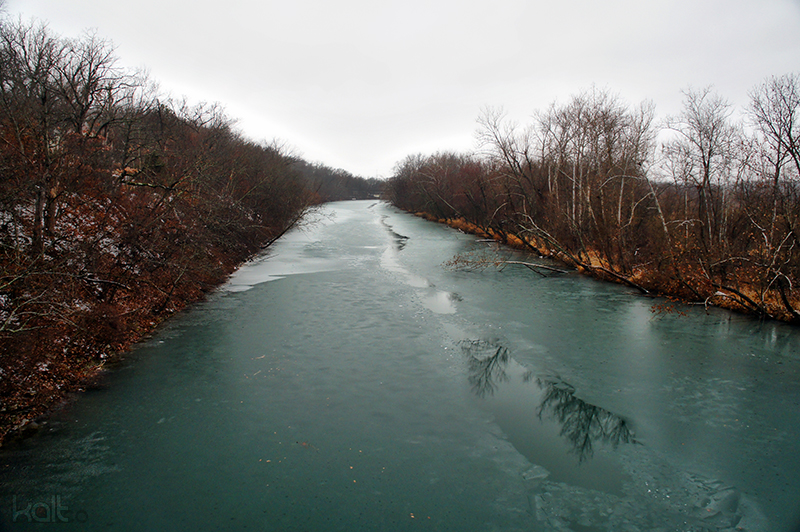
- James River near Springfield

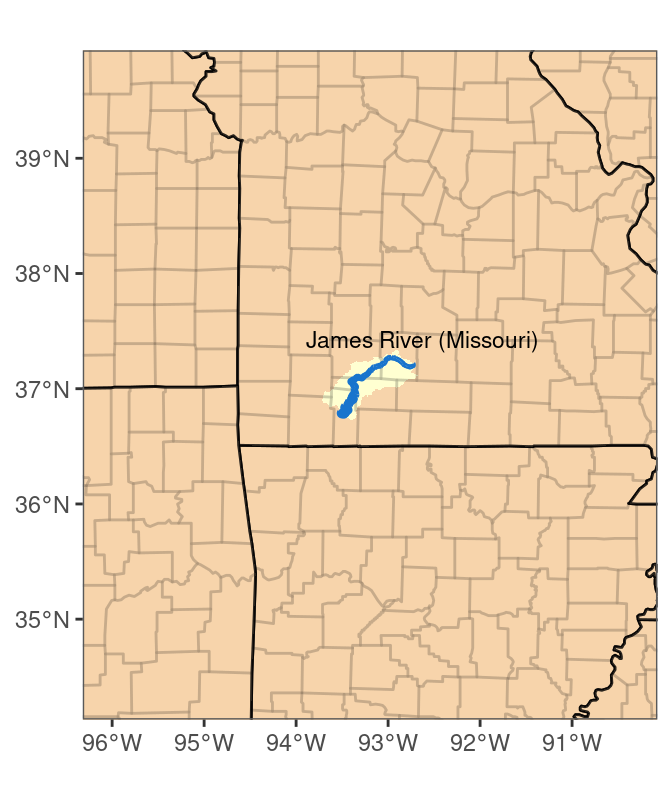
- Map of the James River watershed

Location
- Country: United States
- State: Missouri
- Region: Webster, Christian, Greene, and Stone counties
- Municipality: Springfield, Missouri

Physical characteristics
- Source
  - location: Eastern Webster County
  - coordinates: 37°13′11″N 92°43′44″W
  - elevation: 1,650 ft (500 m)
- Mouth
  - location: Table Rock Lake, Stone County
  - coordinates: 36°47′11″N 93°29′56″W
  - elevation: 1,125 ft (343 m)
- Length: 130 mi (210 km)
- Discharge
  - location: Galena (includes Flat Creek)
  - average: 1,295 cu/ft. per sec.

Basin features
- Tributaries
  - left: North Carolina Creek, Panther Creek (James River tributary), Finley Creek, Tory Creek, Goff Creek, Horse Creek, Wilson Run
  - right: Teague Creek, Turnbo Creek, Pierson Creek, Wheeler Branch, Pine Run

The James River is a 130-mile-long (210 km) river in southern Missouri. It flows from northeast Webster County until it is impounded into Table Rock Lake. It is part of the White River watershed. The river forms Lake Springfield and supplies drinking water for the city of Springfield.

== Name ==
The name most likely is a transfer from the James River located in Virginia. James River Freeway on the Springfield's south side is named after the river.

== Course ==
Its source is northeast of the town of Seymour in Webster County. Its headwaters initially flow south then turns west to northwesterly north of Seymour and turns southwest near Northview and passes down the east side of Springfield where it is impounded to form Lake Springfield. From Springfield, it flows west, southwest of Nixa and then south past Galena where it enters Table Rock Lake, a reservoir on the White River.

Major tributaries into the James River include: Pierson Creek, Teague Creek, Woolly Creek, Wilson Creek, Finley Creek, Crane Creek, and Flat Creek.

== Recreation ==
Large sections of the James River are floatable by canoe or kayak. A solid 3-day float from the public access on the downstream side of the (Lake Springfield) dam to Galena is possible when the levels are high enough. There are several public access points along the river including: Delaware Town, Shelvin Rock, Hootentown, and HL Kerr access.

The James River is a source of drinking water for the city of Springfield. Lake Springfield is the primary source of water for the cooling system at the James River Power Plant which sits by the dam. The lake is a popular fishing and kayaking destination with docks and access points made by the Missouri Conservation Department. The river contains bass, catfish, crappie and bluegill. Four of the five world record Ozark bass were caught on the James River.

== Dams ==
The dam on the James River creates Lake Springfield, which used to serve as the cooling reservoir for the James River Power Plant prior to its closure in 2022.

The river creates the James River Arm of Table Rock Lake, and flows into the impounded White River upstream from the hydroelectric Table Rock Dam, operated by the United States Army Corps of Engineers.

== See also ==
- List of rivers in Missouri
