= Reeds Spring, Missouri =

- City
- Location of Reeds Spring, Missouri
- Coordinates: 36°44′44″N 93°22′58″W
- Country: United States
- State: Missouri
- County: Stone

Area
  - Total: 1.48 sq mi (3.83 km^{2})
  - Land: 1.48 sq mi (3.83 km^{2})
  - Water: 0 sq mi (0.00 km^{2})
- Elevation: 1,180 ft (360 m)

Population (2020)
  - Total: 1,136
  - Density: 757.8/sq mi (292.58/km^{2})
- Time zone: UTC-6 (Central (CST))
  - Summer (DST): UTC-5 (CDT)
- ZIP code: 65737
- Area code: 417
- FIPS code: 29-61112
- GNIS Feature ID: 751846
- Website: www.reedsspringmo.gov

Reeds Spring is a city in Stone County, Missouri, United States. The population was 1,136 at the 2020 census.

== History ==
The community has the name of Fitzhugh Reed, who settled at a spring near the original town site. Reed operated a farm there called Reed's Springs before the town was officially organized in 1906.

== Geography ==
Reeds Spring is located at 36°44′44″N 93°22′58″W (36.745692, -93.382727).

According to the United States Census Bureau, the city has a total area of 1.48 square miles (3.83 km^{2}), all land.

== Demographics ==
Historical population
Census	Pop.	Note	%±
1930	313		—
1940	353		12.8%
1950	313		−11.3%
1960	327		4.5%
1970	286		−12.5%
1980	461		61.2%
1990	411		−10.8%
2000	465		13.1%
2010	913		96.3%
2020	1,136		24.4%
U.S. Decennial Census

=== 2010 census ===
As of the census of 2010, there were 913 people, 374 households, and 259 families living in the city. The population density was 616.9 inhabitants per square mile (238.2/km^{2}). There were 453 housing units at an average density of 306.1 per square mile (118.2/km^{2}). The racial makeup of the city was 95.3% White, 0.1% African American, 1.6% Native American, 0.8% Asian, 0.3% from other races, and 1.9% from two or more races. Hispanic or Latino of any race were 2.3% of the population.

There were 374 households, of which 31.6% had children under the age of 18 living with them, 52.1% were married couples living together, 13.4% had a female householder with no husband present, 3.7% had a male householder with no wife present, and 30.7% were non-families. 24.1% of all households were made up of individuals, and 11.8% had someone living alone who was 65 years of age or older. The average household size was 2.44 and the average family size was 2.90.

The median age in the city was 35.5 years. 26.1% of residents were under the age of 18; 8.3% were between the ages of 18 and 24; 26.3% were from 25 to 44; 24.5% were from 45 to 64; and 14.8% were 65 years of age or older. The gender makeup of the city was 47.1% male and 52.9% female. 61.3% of women 12 and older had 1 or more children.

=== 2000 census ===
As of the census of 2000, there were 465 people, 197 households, and 123 families living in the city. The population density was 735.9 inhabitants per square mile (284.1/km^{2}). There were 237 housing units at an average density of 375.1 per square mile (144.8/km^{2}). The racial makeup of the city was 96.34% White, 1.08% Native American, 0.22% Asian, 0.86% from other races, and 1.51% from two or more races. Hispanic or Latino of any race were 1.51% of the population.

There were 197 households, out of which 28.9% had children under the age of 18 living with them, 50.8% were married couples living together, 8.1% had a female householder with no husband present, and 37.1% were non-families. 31.0% of all households were made up of individuals, and 16.2% had someone living alone who was 65 years of age or older. The average household size was 2.36 and the average family size was 2.93.

In the city the population was spread out, with 26.2% under the age of 18, 7.3% from 18 to 24, 29.5% from 25 to 44, 22.4% from 45 to 64, and 14.6% who were 65 years of age or older. The median age was 36 years. For every 100 females, there were 92.1 males. For every 100 females age 18 and over, there were 88.5 males.

The median income for a household in the city was $25,982, and the median income for a family was $29,896. Males had a median income of $25,000 versus $18,125 for females. The per capita income for the city was $13,103. About 9.9% of families and 18.4% of the population were below the poverty line, including 21.6% of those under age 18 and 13.5% of those age 65 or over.

== Education ==
It is in the Reeds Spring R-IV School District..

Reeds Spring School District serves the communities of Reeds Spring, Branson West, Kimberling City, Cape Fair, and Indian Point. The district operates six schools:

- Reeds Spring Primary School (pre-K-1st Grade)
- Reeds Spring Elementary School (2nd-4th Grades)
- Reeds Spring Intermediate School (5th & 6th Grades)
- Reeds Spring Middle School (7th & 8th Grades)
- Reeds Spring High School (9th-12th Grades)
- Gibson Technical Center (11th & 12th Grades)
