= Pleasant Hope, Missouri =

- City
- Location of Pleasant Hope, Missouri
- Coordinates: 37°27′54″N 93°16′27″W
- Country: United States
- State: Missouri
- County: Polk
- Incorporated: 1980

Area
  - Total: 1.57 sq mi (4.06 km^{2})
  - Land: 1.54 sq mi (4.00 km^{2})
  - Water: 0.023 sq mi (0.06 km^{2})
- Elevation: 1,119 ft (341 m)

Population (2020)
  - Total: 657
  - Density: 425/sq mi (164.2/km^{2})
- Time zone: UTC-6 (Central (CST))
  - Summer (DST): UTC-5 (CDT)
- ZIP code: 65725
- Area code: 417
- FIPS code: 29-58448
- GNIS feature ID: 2396232
- Website: cityofpleasanthope.com

Pleasant Hope is a city in Polk County, Missouri, United States. As of the 2020 census, Pleasant Hope had a population of 657. It is part of the Springfield, Missouri Metropolitan Statistical Area.

== History ==
A post office called Pleasant Hope has been in operation since 1851. The name is indicative of the early settlers' optimism concerning the future.

== Geography ==
According to the United States Census Bureau, the city has a total area of 1.57 square miles (4.07 km^{2}), of which 1.55 square miles (4.01 km^{2}) is land and 0.02 square miles (0.05 km^{2}) is water.

== Demographics ==
Historical population
| Census | Pop. | Note | %± |
|---|---|---|---|
| 1880 | 80 | | — |
| 1950 | 174 | | — |
| 1960 | 216 | | 24.1% |
| 1970 | 265 | | 22.7% |
| 1980 | 354 | | 33.6% |
| 1990 | 360 | | 1.7% |
| 2000 | 548 | | 52.2% |
| 2010 | 614 | | 12.0% |
| 2020 | 657 | | 7.0% |
U.S. Decennial Census

=== 2010 census ===
As of the census of 2010, there were 614 people, 243 households, and 162 families living in the city. The population density was 396.1 inhabitants per square mile (152.9/km^{2}). There were 275 housing units at an average density of 177.4 per square mile (68.5/km^{2}). The racial makeup of the city was 95.4% White, 0.8% Native American, 0.3% Asian, 1.3% from other races, and 2.1% from two or more races. Hispanic or Latino of any race were 3.4% of the population.

There were 243 households, of which 39.1% had children under the age of 18 living with them, 50.6% were married couples living together, 12.3% had a female householder with no husband present, 3.7% had a male householder with no wife present, and 33.3% were non-families. 26.3% of all households were made up of individuals, and 10.7% had someone living alone who was 65 years of age or older. The average household size was 2.53 and the average family size was 3.04.

The median age in the city was 33.5 years. 27% of residents were under the age of 18; 8.7% were between the ages of 18 and 24; 30.6% were from 25 to 44; 24.1% were from 45 to 64; and 9.6% were 65 years of age or older. The gender makeup of the city was 48.7% male and 51.3% female.

=== 2000 census ===
As of the census of 2000, there were 548 people, 209 households, and 142 families living in the city. The population density was 653.0 inhabitants per square mile (252.1/km^{2}). There were 229 housing units at an average density of 272.9 per square mile (105.4/km^{2}). The racial makeup of the city was 97.26% White, 0.55% African American, 0.73% Native American, and 1.46% from two or more races. Hispanic or Latino of any race were 0.55% of the population.

There were 209 households, out of which 41.6% had children under the age of 18 living with them, 51.7% were married couples living together, 14.4% had a female householder with no husband present, and 31.6% were nonfamilies. 28.2% of all households were made up of individuals, and 16.7% had someone living alone who was 65 years of age or older. The average household size was 2.62 and the average family size was 3.23.

In the city the population was spread out, with 30.8% under the age of 18, 11.1% from 18 to 24, 29.7% from 25 to 44, 17.7% from 45 to 64, and 10.6% who were 65 years of age or older. The median age was 30 years. For every 100 females, there were 84.5 males. For every 100 females age 18 and over, there were 80.5 males.

The median income for a household in the city was $31,250, and the median income for a family was $35,625. Males had a median income of $27,500 versus $16,842 for females. The per capita income for the city was $12,657. About 14.4% of families and 16.7% of the population were below the poverty line, including 25.0% of those under age 18 and 23.3% of those age 65 or over.
