= Ponce de Leon, Missouri =

Ponce de Leon
- unincorporated community
- Location within Missouri
- Coordinates: 36°52′34″N 93°21′4″W
- Country: United States
- State: Missouri
- County: Stone County
- Founded: about 1875

Ponce de Leon is an unincorporated community in northeastern Stone County, Missouri, United States, approximately 30 miles (50 km) south of Springfield. It is part of the Branson, Missouri Micropolitan Statistical Area.

The community is located on the East Prong Goff Creek, which is a tributary of the James River about three miles to the west. Missouri Supplemental Route V passes through the village, which lies at an elevation of 1100 feet. Spokane, in Christian County, lies about three miles to the east on US Route 160. Branson lies about 25 miles to the south.

== History ==
The community was founded circa 1875 as a health resort to exploit the mineral spring at the location. The resort was named for the explorer Juan Ponce de León.

The resort and town prospered, and with a population of around 1000, it was the largest town in the county. Businesses included a sawmill, a gristmill, a bank and tomato cannery. However, the boom did not last and by 1885, damage by flash floods and other economic problems led to decay and loss of population.

Area residents refer to the community as "Poncie"; for years, use of the full name has virtually been abandoned.
