= Missouri State High School Activities Association =

High school sports association

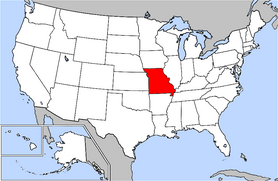
- Abbreviation: MSHSAA
- Formation: 1926
- Type: Volunteer; NPO
- Legal status: Association
- Purpose: Athletic/Educational
- Headquarters: 1 North Keene St. Columbia, MO 65205
- Region served: Missouri
- Members: 730 full member schools
- Executive Director: Dr. Jennifer Rukstad
- Affiliations: National Federation of State High School Associations
- Staff: 26
- Website: mshsaa.org
- Remarks: (573) 875-4880

The Missouri State High School Activities Association (MSHSAA) is the governing body for high school activities throughout the U.S. state of Missouri. Approximately 720 high schools are members of MSHSAA. There are close to 250 additional affiliate members and around 25 home school associations.

The MSHSAA conducts championship-level activities in 23 activities. At least 50 member high schools must sponsor a sport for an official championship series to be conducted. Sports such as boys volleyball, field hockey, girls lacrosse, boys softball, and water polo are considered "emerging sports" by MSHSAA, but an official postseason series does not exist with less than 50 schools involved in those activities. MSHSAA also administers sideline cheerleading and dance team activities.

== History ==
In 1925, while 46 of the states in the US already had governing bodies to regulate interscholastic activities, Missouri did not. Basketball and track already had statewide tournaments organized by the University of Missouri but rules on eligibility, playoff qualification, and other matters were handled by local leagues. The first meeting was held on November 13, 1925, at the Statler Hotel in St. Louis where a subsequent constitutional convention was scheduled for December 12, 1925. Carl Burris was the first secretary of MSHSAA, and the following men drafted the original constitution:

- W. T. Doherty, Cape Girardeau
- C. C. Conrad, Charleston
- Dr. H. S. Curtis, Jefferson City
- T. C. Reid, Warrensburg
- C. O. Williams, Jefferson City
- D. W. Hopkins, St. Joseph
- Uel W. Lampkin, Maryville
- J. D. Deaton, Butler
- H. N. McCall, Carterville
- Carl Burris, Clayton
- H. R. Shepherd, Kansas City
- Coach G. Henry, Columbia
- W. F. Byers, Carthage
- O. G. Sanford, Trenton

The organization was formed in 1926 when the constitution was approved and adopted, and MSHSAA set its residence in Columbia. "By the close of the 1926-27 school year...472 schools [had] joined the association." MSHSAA's first focus was to ensure uniform eligibility requirements and "control abuses that were creeping into" Missouri athletics. In 1949, MSHSAA expanded its focus from solely athletics to include other activities such as band, drama, and speech/debate; the acronym stayed the same, but the name was officially changed. The organization continued to evolve, and in 1956, the board adopted a program that would aim to use high school activities to educate students in a more holistic way.

The first state final under MSHSAA auspices was in boys' basketball, held in 1926 at Rothwell Gymnasium on the Mizzou campus; track and tennis finals would follow later that year. MSHSAA removed the color barrier in 1952, allowing schools from the MNIAA (Missouri Negro Interscholastic Athletic Association) to join; many of these schools would later consolidate with formerly whites-only schools. In 1968, the group unified football tournaments (previously only held locally) to form the Show-Me Bowl that exists today. Girls' sports were first sanctioned by MSHSAA in 1972, when eight regional playoffs for basketball were held; a full state championship was added the following year.

== Classifications ==
MSHSAA's member schools are organized into groups based on enrollment, with Class 1 being the smallest. In 11-man football the largest is Class 6, comprising the largest 32 schools based on enrollment. Schools wishing to play 8-man football must have an enrollment smaller than 200 total students. Boys' and girls' basketball were expanded to six classes in 2020, and baseball was moved to six classes in 2022. Class 6 schools are those with 1,059 students and above; while Class 1 schools are those with 119 students and below. Prior to 2003, the classes were divided into four classes from "A" to "AAAA" (popularly referred to as "1A" to "4A").

However, the number of classes varies by the number of schools that participate in a sport: for example, speech, debate, and theater only have one class, swimming and diving has two classes, while girls' softball and girls' volleyball use four classes.

Schools in Missouri are able to form their own conferences and play whichever teams they wish in regular season competition. For example, the Ozark Conference, in the southwest portion of the state, has teams from two classes competing against one another.

Schools are assigned into districts for playoff competition only; districts vary depending on sport, size and geographic location. Also unlike other states, there is no "regional" championship designation; during playoff competition schools are generally organized into brackets that are close in geographic proximity.

Wrestling and track districts, for instance, usually have 10 or more teams due to the nature of competition, while football districts have anywhere from four to five. Beginning with the 2012 football season, districts comprised eight schools. In other sports, district competition is set up like a more traditional tournament bracket at the end of the regular season. The winner of the district tournament advances in the championship series.

Redistricting and regrouping now occurs every year.

Class 6 and Class 5 schools generally come from the state's major metro areas: St. Louis, Kansas City, Springfield, Joplin and Columbia/ Jefferson City, although there are exceptions. Class 3, 2 and 1 schools are generally rural, although some small private city schools are grouped here as well.

== Organization ==
MSHSAA is headquartered in Columbia. 723 schools, both public and private, were members in the 2025-2026 school year. Its current executive director is Dr. Jennifer Rukstad.

MSHSAA is governed by a 10-member board of directors whose members are elected to four-year terms by school representatives in eight geographic regions of the state. Two at-large positions to the Board of Directors were added in 2005 to ensure racial and gender diversity.

Potential changes to MSHSAA's by-laws, such as eligibility standards and activity regulations, are voted on each April, or in special elections, by the association's 723 member schools. A process that includes input from more than 30 standing advisory committees, area meetings conducted throughout the state, and an annual questionnaire to the membership help identify issues to be voted on in the annual ballot process and identify issues for further study or modification. Member schools may also request specific changes to the association's by-laws and constitution through a petition process that places the item directly on the annual ballot.

The association's by-laws fall into the following general categories: Bona Fide Student, Citizenship, Academics, Residence Requirements, Transferring Schools, Participation Limits, Entering School, Amateur & Awards Standards, Age Limits, Playing Under a False Name, Graduated Students, Nonschool Competition, College Auditions & Tryouts, All-Star Games, Recruiting of Athletes, Transfer for Athletic Reasons, Sports Camps & Clinics, Sportsmanship, and Foreign Student Eligibility. A three-level appeals process is in place for students not meeting the essential eligibility standards due to unusual, unforeseen or unexpected circumstances.

Each of the state's eight geographic regions not only elects members to the Board of Directors and Appeals Committee, but also nominates representatives to the aforementioned advisory committees and elects three members to serve on each region's investigative committee. The investigative committees were formed to investigate formal complaints filed regarding suspected by-law violations committed by member schools.

The association publishes a quarterly magazine, MSHSAA Journal, and sponsors one of the nation's largest annual sportsmanship and student leadership events each August. In addition, MSHSAA has a number of recognition programs, including the Distinguished Service Awards program, Officials Recognition program, Scholastic Achievement Awards program, Student Advisory Committee, MSHSAA Leadership School program, Sportsmanship/Integrity/Leadership program, the 5-Star School program and Traditions reunion program.

The MSHSAA trains and registers more than 5,000 sports officials and adjudicators each year to arbitrate various athletic events and evaluative music festivals.

== State Finals sites ==
These are the venues for the state championships during the 2025-26 school year.

- Football: Spratt Stadium, St. Joseph
- Soccer: World Wide Technology Soccer Park, Fenton
- Girls' Volleyball: St. Joseph Civic Arena, St. Joseph
- Boys' Volleyball: Show Me Center, Cape Girardeau
- Basketball: Mizzou Arena, Columbia
- Swimming and Diving: St. Peters Rec-Plex, St. Peters
- Baseball: Ozark Mountain Sports Complex, Ozark
- Softball (fall and spring): Killian Softball Complex, Springfield
- Cross-Country: Gans Creek XC Course, Columbia
- Track and Field: Pete Adkins Stadium, Jefferson City
- Tennis: Cooper Tennis Complex, Springfield
- Golf: Multiple locations, varying by class
- Wrestling: Mizzou Arena, Columbia
- Speech and Debate: Missouri State University, Springfield
- Music: University of Missouri, Columbia
- Scholar Bowl: University of Missouri, Columbia

== Criticism ==
Some schools, notably in Kansas City where Rockhurst High School is powerful in local athletics, have proposed separate playoffs for public and private schools in some sports (mostly soccer). This, however, has met resistance from most of the other parts of the state, especially St. Louis where the gulf between public and private schools is less noticeable than in KC. Instead of separate championships, MSHSAA used a 1.35 multiplier for school enrollments in determining classes for private schools. In addition, like in most other states, the enrollments of single-sex schools doubled to better reflect how they would compete against co-ed public school's. Beginning in 2020, however, MSHSAA voted to drop the private school multiplier and instead elected to determine class placement for private schools on a sport-by-sport basis using a "competitive coefficient". Under this system, private and charter schools will be placed at a "floor" class based on their raw/doubled enrollment, and can be moved up to two classes higher based on performance in certain sports over a six-year window.

=== Gender equity ===
Concerns regarding gender bias on both sides have been raised regarding MSHSAA policies. For instance, in legal counsel Mallory Mayse’s National Case Summaries 1934-2017, “The ‘gender’ category of cases [connected to NFHS] is second only to ‘transfers’ in total number.”

Original questions center around inequity in education, which resulted in Title IX of the Educational Amendments of 1972, stating “No person in the United States shall, on the basis of sex, be excluded from participation, be denied the benefits of, or be subjected to discrimination under any education programs or activity receiving federal financial assistance.” Additionally, The Equal Protection Clause, connected to the Fourteenth Amendment to the US Constitution, took effect in 1868 and states that “no state shall deny to any person within its jurisdiction “the equal protection of the laws.” The US Supreme Court designates state athletic/activity associations as State Actors; therefore, MSHSAA has legal responsibilities to provide equitable opportunities. This includes the following considerations:

- Sport and activity options that reflect interests and abilities
- Available scholarships at the collegiate level
- Equipment and supplies
- Game and practice times
- Travel, dining, and housing reimbursement/quality
- Educational and coaching support
- Facilities
- Medical care and training services
- Publicity
- Other support services
- Collegiate recruitment

In the 1971-1972 school year, prior to Title IX implementation, “294,015 girls and 3,666,917 boys participated in high school sports; girls = 7.4% of participants.” In the 2016-2017 school year, as Missouri high schools have worked to create equal opportunities, “3,400,297 girls and 4,563,238 boys participated in high school sports; girls = 42.7% of participants.” Girls’ participation more than doubled while boys’ participation also grew.

To keep the athletics portion equitable, MSHSAA currently hosts state championships for 10 boys’ sports and 10 girls’ sports. Furthermore, there are 4 emerging co-ed sports, 2 emerging boys’ sports, and 2 emerging girls’ sports, none of which have MSHSAA-hosted championship series.

People opposed to Title IX’s implications argue that now, boys’ sports have a bias against them, protesting, for example, that girls’ lacrosse is an emerging sport while boys’ lacrosse is not and that girls’ field hockey is also an emerging sport while boys’ ice hockey is not. According to MaxPreps, hosted by CBS Sports, there are 66 girls’ lacrosse teams in Missouri and 69 boys’ lacrosse teams; however, Inside Lacrosse records 42 high school girls’ teams and 32 boys’ high school teams. MaxPreps also lists over 200 girls’ field hockey teams and only 11 boys’ ice hockey teams. All schools listed are not necessarily member schools.

Another contentious area addresses transgender athlete rights. MSHSAA’s board policy 34, listed in MSHSAA’s Handbook, describes rules related to transgender athletes. A student not receiving medical hormone treatment may participate in birth-assigned gender activities. “A trans male (female to male)...may participate in co-ed sports and may apply to participate in boys sports,” but he must remain in the sport throughout high school. “A trans female (male to female)...may not compete on a girls’ team, but may participate in co-ed and boys sports. (See also By-Law 3.20.)” Student athletes who are receiving medical hormonal treatment have different rules. Trans males “who [have] commenced medical/hormone treatment with prescribed drugs for diagnosed gender dysphoria and/or transsexualism, may compete on a boys’ team, but is no longer eligible to compete on a girls’ team without changing that team status to a co-ed team,” and Trans females “being treated with hormone suppression medication...may continue to compete on a boys’ team but may not compete on a girls’ team, without changing it to a co-ed team, until one calendar year of documented medical/hormone treatment and/or suppression is completed.” Additionally, trans females must maintain treatment and provide ongoing documentation. The policy was borrowed (with permission) from the NCAA Transgender Participation Policy, commissioned in 2012 and published in Champions of Respect.

Nicky Taghert, a student athlete from Clayton High School, became the first Missouri transgender high school athlete to apply for eligibility through MSHSAA in November of 2017. To receive eligibility, Taghert had to sit out one year while she received hormone therapy treatment toward transition. Ultimately, Taghert was granted permission and played on the girls’ soccer team her senior year in 2019.

In March 2021, Missouri House Bill 1045, sponsored by Representative Chuck Bayse of Boone County, was debated in a House committee meeting. The bill requests a statewide ballot that would change the constitution. Bayse’s motivation was fueled by concerns of transgender athletes dominating girls’ sports. The bill would allow cisgender females to play either girls’ or boys’ sports but would only allow cisgender males to play boys’ sports even if they were receiving hormone therapy. If the Republican-led Congress approves the bill, the proposed amendment vote would appear on the 2022 ballots. A similar resolution, Senate Resolution 50, was previously sponsored by Senator Cindy O’Laughlin. She argued that MSHSAA “made the decision to insert themselves into the current ideological culture war” by asking which gender students identified as on a physical evaluation form. Likewise, House Joint Resolution 82, presented by Representative Robert Ross would require student athletes to compete in birth-assigned roles. In the end, none of the measures banning trans participation in high school sports were enacted.

Competitive cheerleading was removed from the list of sponsored sports in 2006 after the dramatic fall and injury of a Southern Illinois University-Carbondale cheerleader, and MSHSAA now recognizes cheerleading as only a "sideline activity."

== Broadcasting ==
MSHSAA did not reach an agreement with Fox Sports Midwest to televise the 2015 state football championships. MSHSAA stated that Fox wanted money which they could not afford. However, Fox stated that the association went in a "different direction" with its media rights. The 2015 state championship games were available via a paid streaming service sponsored by the National Federation of State High School Associations.

== Activities ==
=== Sports ===
- American football (11-man and 8-man)
- Baseball
- Basketball (girls and boys)
- Cross-country (girls and boys)
- Golf (girls and boys)
- Soccer (girls and boys)
- Softball (girls)
- Swimming and diving (girls and boys)
- Tennis (girls and boys)
- Track and field (girls and boys)
- Volleyball (girls and boys)
- Wrestling (girls and boys)

=== Activities ===
- Music
- Scholar bowl
- Speech, debate and theatre
- Spirit Activities (cheer and dance)

=== Emerging sports and activities ===
Emerging sports and activities are in their first year of inclusion or do not have 50 schools registered. Additionally, they have fewer restrictions and more flexibility; however, they also receive limited services through MSHSAA since they are not fully adopted. Per the 2024-25 MSHSAA Handbook, the following sports and activities are considered emerging:

- Girls field hockey: 33 schools (sport)
- Girls lacrosse: 41 schools (sport)
- Boys water polo: 22 schools (sport)
- Girls water polo: 15 schools (sport)
- Bass fishing: 20 schools (activity)
- Bowling: 11 schools (activity)
- Chess: 21 schools (activity)
- Target shooting: 36 schools (activity)
- Girls stunt: 13 schools (sport)
- Girls flag football (sport)
- Unified track and field (sport)

Current Provisionally Interscholastic Sports/Activities:

- Esports: 129 schools (activity)

== See also ==
- List of Missouri high schools by athletic conferences
- List of Missouri state high school boys basketball championships
- List of Missouri state high school football champions
- List of Missouri state high school girls basketball championships
- List of Missouri state high school girls volleyball championships
