= Stone County, Missouri =

County in Missouri, United States

- County
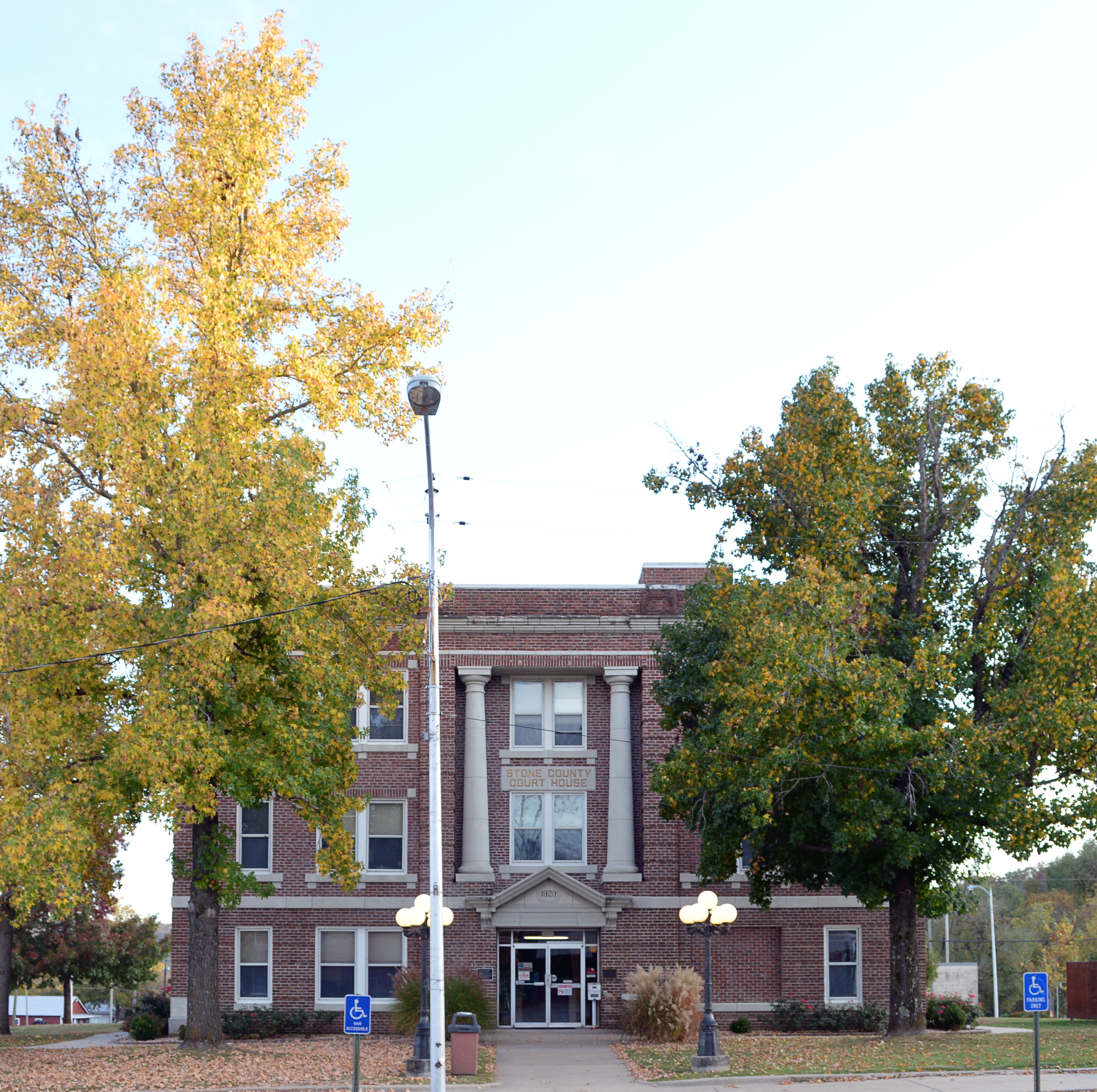
- The Stone County Courthouse in Galena

- Location within the U.S. state of Missouri
- Coordinates: 36°44′N 93°28′W
- Country: United States
- State: Missouri
- Founded: February 10, 1851
- Named for: William Stone, English pioneer and an early settler in Maryland
- Seat: Galena
- Largest city: Kimberling City

Area
  - Total: 511 sq mi (1,320 km^{2})
  - Land: 464 sq mi (1,200 km^{2})
  - Water: 47 sq mi (120 km^{2}) 9.2%

Population (2020)
  - Total: 31,076
  - Estimate (2025): 32,503 ▲
  - Density: 67.0/sq mi (25.9/km^{2})
- Time zone: UTC−6 (Central)
  - Summer (DST): UTC−5 (CDT)
- Congressional district: 7th
- Website: www.stoneco-mo.us

Stone County is located in the southwestern portion of the U.S. state of Missouri. As of the 2020 census, the population was 31,076. Its county seat is Galena.

Stone County was part of the Branson micropolitan area until 2023.

== History ==
The county was officially organized on February 10, 1851, and is named after William Stone, an English pioneer and an early settler in Maryland who also served as Taney County Judge.

In 1904, the White River Railway was extended through the rugged terrain of Stone and Taney counties. By then, both counties had had a sundown town policy for years, forbidding African Americans from living there.

== Geography ==
According to the U.S. Census Bureau, the county has a total area of 511 square miles (1,320 km^{2}), of which 464 square miles (1,200 km^{2}) is land and 47 square miles (120 km^{2}) (9.2%) is water.

=== Adjacent counties ===
- Christian County (north)
- Taney County (east)
- Carroll County, Arkansas (south)
- Barry County (west)
- Lawrence County (northwest)

=== National protected area ===
- Mark Twain National Forest (part)

== Demographics ==
Historical population
Census	Pop.	Note	%±
1860	2,400		—
1870	3,253		35.5%
1880	4,404		35.4%
1890	7,090		61.0%
1900	9,892		39.5%
1910	11,559		16.9%
1920	11,941		3.3%
1930	11,614		−2.7%
1940	11,298		−2.7%
1950	9,748		−13.7%
1960	8,176		−16.1%
1970	9,921		21.3%
1980	15,587		57.1%
1990	19,078		22.4%
2000	28,658		50.2%
2010	32,202		12.4%
2020	31,076		−3.5%
2025 (est.)	32,503	▲	4.6%
U.S. Decennial Census; 1790-1960 1900-1990; 1990-2000 2010-2015

=== Racial and ethnic composition ===
Stone County, Missouri – Racial and ethnic composition Note: the US Census treats Hispanic/Latino as an ethnic category. This table excludes Latinos from the racial categories and assigns them to a separate category. Hispanics/Latinos may be of any race.
Race / Ethnicity (NH = Non-Hispanic)	Pop 1980	Pop 1990	Pop 2000	Pop 2010	Pop 2020	% 1980	% 1990	% 2000	% 2010	% 2020
White alone (NH)	15,402	18,790	27,797	30,938	28,296	98.81%	98.49%	97.00%	96.07%	91.05%
Black or African American alone (NH)	0	6	17	46	79	0.00%	0.03%	0.06%	0.14%	0.25%
Native American or Alaska Native alone (NH)	108	131	164	172	215	0.69%	0.69%	0.57%	0.53%	0.69%
Asian alone (NH)	20	37	52	95	115	0.13%	0.19%	0.18%	0.30%	0.37%
Native Hawaiian or Pacific Islander alone (NH)	x	x	9	8	20	x	x	0.03%	0.02%	0.06%
Other race alone (NH)	8	0	6	18	84	0.05%	0.00%	0.02%	0.06%	0.27%
Mixed race or Multiracial (NH)	x	x	315	372	1,485	x	x	1.10%	1.16%	4.78%
Hispanic or Latino (any race)	49	114	298	553	782	0.31%	0.60%	1.04%	1.72%	2.52%
Total	15,587	19,078	28,658	32,202	31,076	100.00%	100.00%	100.00%	100.00%	100.00%

=== 2020 census ===
As of the 2020 census, the county had a population of 31,076, a median age of 54.0 years, 17.0% of residents under the age of 18, and 30.8% of residents 65 years of age or older. For every 100 females there were 98.8 males, and for every 100 females age 18 and over there were 96.3 males age 18 and over.

17.1% of residents lived in urban areas, while 82.9% lived in rural areas.

There were 13,296 households, of which 20.8% had children under the age of 18 living with them and 20.1% had a female householder with no spouse or partner present. About 24.7% of all households were made up of individuals and 13.8% had someone living alone who was 65 years of age or older.

There were 19,935 housing units, of which 33.3% were vacant. Among occupied housing units, 81.3% were owner-occupied and 18.7% were renter-occupied. The homeowner vacancy rate was 2.8% and the rental vacancy rate was 21.9%.

The racial makeup (assigning Hispanics to the various racial categories) of the county was 91.0% White, 0.3% Black or African American, 0.7% American Indian and Alaska Native, 0.4% Asian, 0.1% Pacific Islander, 0.8% from some other race, and 5.1% from two or more races. Hispanic or Latino residents of any race comprised 2.5% of the population, and detailed totals are listed below.

Stone County Racial Composition
Race	Num.	Perc.
White (NH)	28,296	91.05%
Black or African American (NH)	79	0.25%
Native American (NH)	215	0.7%
Asian (NH)	115	0.37%
Pacific Islander (NH)	20	0.06%
Other/Mixed (NH)	1,569	5.05%
Hispanic or Latino	782	2.52%

=== 2000 census ===
As of the census of 2000, there were 28,658 people, 11,822 households, and 8,842 families residing in the county. The population density was 62 inhabitants per square mile (24 inhabitants/km^{2}). There were 16,241 housing units at an average density of 35 units per square mile (14/km^{2}). The racial makeup of the county was 97.64% White, 0.07% Black or African American, 0.61% Native American, 0.18% Asian, 0.03% Pacific Islander, 0.25% from other races, and 1.20% from two or more races. Approximately 1.04% of the population were Hispanic or Latino of any race. Among the major first ancestries reported in Stone County were 24.3% American, 20.4% German, 11.3% English, and 10.8% Irish ancestry.

There were 11,822 households, out of which 25.60% had children under the age of 18 living with them, 64.70% were married couples living together, 7.20% had a female householder with no husband present, and 25.20% were non-families. 21.40% of all households were made up of individuals, and 10.30% had someone living alone who was 65 years of age or older. The average household size was 2.40 and the average family size was 2.76.

In the county, the population was spread out, with 21.40% under the age of 18, 6.20% from 18 to 24, 23.80% from 25 to 44, 29.70% from 45 to 64, and 18.90% who were 65 years of age or older. The median age was 44 years. For every 100 females, there were 96.20 males. For every 100 females age 18 and over, there were 93.10 males.

The median income for a household in the county was $40,487, and the median income for a family was $46,675. Males had a median income of $26,224 versus $19,190 for females. The per capita income for the county was $21,813. About 8.50% of families and 12.80% of the population were below the poverty line, including 19.00% of those under age 18 and 8.10% of those age 65 or over.

== Education ==
Of adults 25 years of age and older in Stone County, 80.4% possesses a high school diploma or higher while 14.2% holds a bachelor's degree or higher as their highest educational attainment.

K-12 school districts in the county, including those based in other counties that have portions of this county, include:

- Billings R-IV School District
- Blue Eye R-V School District
- Clever R-V School District
- Crane R-III School District
- Galena R-II School District
- Hollister R-V School District
- Hurley R-I School District
- Marionville R-IX School District
- Nixa School District
- Reeds Spring R-IV School District
- Spokane R-VII School District

The county also has one elementary school district, Shell Knob 78 School District.

=== Public schools ===
- Blue Eye R-V School District - Blue Eye
  - Blue Eye Elementary School (PK-04)
  - Blue Eye Middle School (05-08)
  - Blue Eye High School (09-12)
- Crane R-III School District - Crane
  - Crane Elementary School (K-06)
  - Crane High School (07-12)
- Galena R-II School District - Galena
  - Galena-Abesville Elementary School (PK-06)
  - Galena High School (07-12)
- Hurley R-I School District - Hurley
  - Hurley Elementary School (K-05)
  - Hurley High School (06-12)
- Reeds Spring R-IV School District - Reeds Spring
  - Reeds Spring Primary School (PK-01)
  - Reeds Spring Elementary School (02-04)
  - Reeds Spring Intermediate School (05-06)
  - Reeds Spring Middle School (07-08)
  - Reeds Spring High School (09-12)

=== Private schools ===
- Apostolic Christian School - Reeds Spring - (05-12) - Non-denominational Christian

=== Alternative and vocational schools ===
- Tri-Lakes Special Education Cooperative - Blue Eye - (K-12) - Special Education
- Gibson Technical Center - Reeds Spring - (09-12) - Vocational/Technical
- New Horizons Alternative School - Reeds Spring - (06-12) - Alternative/Other

=== Public libraries ===
- Blue Eye Public Library
- Crane Public Library
- Galena Public Library
- Kimberling Area Library

== Politics and government ==
=== Government ===
Stone County is a third-class county located in Southwest Missouri. The county's government includes a 3-person County Commission (Presiding Commissioner, Northern District Commissioner, Southern District Commissioner), several elected officials, and a Road Commission consisting of the 3 County Commissioners as well as a Northern Road Commissioner and a Southern Road Commissioner. The County Commission also oversees the Planning and Zoning Department, Senior Citizens' Services Board, a Law Enforcement Restitution Board, and neighborhood improvement districts. All elected Officials in Stone County serve 4 year terms. The county employed 157 full-time employees (including elected officials) and 12 part-time employees as of December 31, 2019.

The Government primarily operates out of the County Seat of Galena, Missouri. The offices of the County Commission, County Clerk, Collector of Revenue, Recorder of Deeds, Treasurer as well as the University of Missouri Extension Office all operate out of the Historic Courthouse in the center of the square. The Stone County Sheriff's office, Judiciary, Circuit Clerk, and Jail are all in the Stone County Judicial Center on the east side of the square. The Assessor and Planning and Zoning offices are located in buildings on the south side of the square.

The Republican Party completely controls politics at the local level in Stone County. All current office holders are members of the Republican Party. Elected Officials in Stone County on average have a long tenure once elected to office.

Stone County, Missouri

Elected countywide officials
Assessor	Matt Daugherty	Republican
Circuit Clerk	Michelee Lebow	Republican
County Clerk	Denise Dickens	Republican
Collector	Anna Burk	Republican
Commissioner (presiding)	Mark W. Maples	Republican
Commissioner (northern district)	Wayne Blades	Republican
Commissioner (southern district)	Hank Smythe	Republican
Coroner	John Cunnyngham	Republican
Prosecuting Attorney	Matt Selby	Republican
Public Administrator	Glenda (Wendy) Metcalf	Republican
Recorder	Amy Jo Larson	Republican
Sheriff	Doug Rader	Republican
Surveyor	Rick Kemp	Republican
Treasurer	Kristi Stephens	Republican

=== State ===
Past Gubernatorial Elections Results
Year	Republican	Democratic	Third Parties
2024	78.98% 14,911	19.32% 3,647	1.71% 322
2020	79.84% 14,704	18.46% 3,399	1.7% 314
2016	72.28% 11,920	25.07% 4,135	2.64% 436
2012	59.29% 9,434	37.86% 6,025	2.85% 453
2008	49.53% 8,043	47.46% 7,708	3.01% 489
2004	67.23% 10,176	31.66% 4,791	1.11% 168
2000	60.91% 7,338	37.22% 4,484	1.87% 225
1996	58.55% 5,886	38.11% 3,831	3.34% 336

Stone County is divided into two legislative districts in the Missouri House of Representatives, both of which are held by Republicans.

- District 138 — Brad Hudson (R-Cape Fair). Consists of almost all of the county.

Missouri House of Representatives — District 138 — General Election (2020)
Party	Candidate	Votes	%	±%
Republican	Brad Hudson	18,652	100.0%	

Missouri House of Representatives — District 138 — General Election (2018)
Party	Candidate	Votes	%	±%
Republican	Brad Hudson	14,734	100.0%	

Missouri House of Representatives — District 138 — Republican Primary (2018)
Party	Candidate	Votes	%	±%
Republican	Brad Hudson	4,691	78.972%	
Republican	Marshall Works	949	15.976	
Republican	Isaac Howard Paul Boyd	300	5.051	

Missouri House of Representatives — District 138 — Stone County (2016)
Party	Candidate	Votes	%	±%
Republican	Don Phillips	14,254	100.00%	

Missouri House of Representatives — District 138 — Stone County (2014)
Party	Candidate	Votes	%	±%
Republican	Don Phillips	7,514	100.00%	

Missouri House of Representatives — District 138 — Stone County (2012)
Party	Candidate	Votes	%	±%
Republican	Don Phillips	13,531	100.00%	

- District 158 — Scott Cupps (R-Shell Knob). Consists of a small, unincorporated region in the northwest part of the county, located just south of Crane.

Missouri House of Representatives — District 158 — Stone County (2016)
Party	Candidate	Votes	%	±%
Republican	Scott Fitzpatrick	105	100.00%	

Missouri House of Representatives — District 158 — Stone County (2014)
Party	Candidate	Votes	%	±%
Republican	Scott Fitzpatrick	47	100.00%	+11.54

Missouri House of Representatives — District 158 — Stone County (2014)
Party	Candidate	Votes	%	±%
Republican	Scott Fitzpatrick	92	88.46%	
Constitution	Sue Beck	12	11.54%	

All of Stone County is a part of Missouri's 29th District in the Missouri Senate and is currently represented by Mike Moon (R-Ash Grove)

Missouri Senate — District 29 — Stone County (2016)
Party	Candidate	Votes	%	±%
Republican	David Sater	14,004	100.00%	

Missouri Senate — District 29 — Stone County (2012)
Party	Candidate	Votes	%	±%
Republican	David Sater	13,503	100.00%	

=== Federal ===
U.S. Senate — Missouri — Stone County (2016)
Party	Candidate	Votes	%	±%
Republican	Roy Blunt	11,620	70.33%	+14.65
Democratic	Jason Kander	4,162	25.19%	−11.00
Libertarian	Jonathan Dine	448	2.71%	−5.42
Green	Johnathan McFarland	137	0.83%	+0.83
Constitution	Fred Ryman	155	0.94%	+0.94

U.S. Senate — Missouri — Stone County (2012)
Party	Candidate	Votes	%	±%
Republican	Todd Akin	8,769	55.68%	
Democratic	Claire McCaskill	5,699	36.19%	
Libertarian	Jonathan Dine	1,281	8.13%	

All of Stone County is included in Missouri's 7th Congressional District and is currently represented by Eric Burlison (R-Springfield) in the U.S. House of Representatives.

U.S. House of Representatives — Missouri's 7th Congressional District — Stone County (2016)
Party	Candidate	Votes	%	±%
Republican	Billy Long	12,384	76.00%	+4.55
Democratic	Genevieve Williams	3,270	20.07%	−1.69
Libertarian	Benjamin T. Brixey	640	3.93%	−2.86

U.S. House of Representatives — Missouri's 7th Congressional District — Stone County (2014)
Party	Candidate	Votes	%	±%
Republican	Billy Long	6,087	71.45%	+1.44
Democratic	Jim Evans	1,854	21.76%	−3.11
Libertarian	Kevin Craig	578	6.79%	+1.67

U.S. House of Representatives — Missouri’s 7th Congressional District — Stone County (2012)
Party	Candidate	Votes	%	±%
Republican	Billy Long	10,967	70.01%	
Democratic	Jim Evans	3,896	24.87%	
Libertarian	Kevin Craig	802	5.12%	

==== Political culture ====
United States presidential election results for Stone County, Missouri
Year	Republican		Democratic		Third party(ies)	
Year	No.	%	No.	%	No.	%
1888	854	67.67%	303	24.01%	105	8.32%
1892	805	61.59%	279	21.35%	223	17.06%
1896	1,094	56.74%	827	42.89%	7	0.36%
1900	1,182	65.12%	573	31.57%	60	3.31%
1904	1,219	73.52%	337	20.33%	102	6.15%
1908	1,376	69.11%	477	23.96%	138	6.93%
1912	946	41.47%	506	22.18%	829	36.34%
1916	1,525	67.24%	621	27.38%	122	5.38%
1920	2,749	78.54%	672	19.20%	79	2.26%
1924	1,871	65.42%	626	21.89%	363	12.69%
1928	2,972	83.88%	559	15.78%	12	0.34%
1932	1,748	47.40%	1,911	51.82%	29	0.79%
1936	3,366	70.94%	1,366	28.79%	13	0.27%
1940	3,598	77.43%	1,041	22.40%	8	0.17%
1944	3,080	80.67%	737	19.30%	1	0.03%
1948	2,222	71.20%	892	28.58%	7	0.22%
1952	3,172	80.69%	748	19.03%	11	0.28%
1956	2,939	73.70%	1,049	26.30%	0	0.00%
1960	3,201	78.24%	890	21.76%	0	0.00%
1964	2,377	56.43%	1,835	43.57%	0	0.00%
1968	3,006	67.32%	1,004	22.49%	455	10.19%
1972	4,180	79.26%	1,094	20.74%	0	0.00%
1976	3,457	59.17%	2,358	40.36%	27	0.46%
1980	4,780	66.31%	2,210	30.66%	219	3.04%
1984	5,706	72.92%	2,119	27.08%	0	0.00%
1988	5,080	63.49%	2,889	36.11%	32	0.40%
1992	4,035	43.88%	3,256	35.41%	1,905	20.72%
1996	5,223	51.40%	3,497	34.42%	1,441	14.18%
2000	7,793	64.13%	4,055	33.37%	303	2.49%
2004	10,534	69.35%	4,578	30.14%	77	0.51%
2008	11,147	67.78%	5,029	30.58%	269	1.64%
2012	11,787	73.45%	3,923	24.45%	337	2.10%
2016	13,158	79.05%	2,887	17.34%	600	3.60%
2020	14,800	80.07%	3,506	18.97%	177	0.96%
2024	15,357	80.31%	3,620	18.93%	146	0.76%

Like most counties situated in Southwest Missouri, Stone County is a Republican stronghold in presidential elections. George W. Bush carried Stone County in 2000 and 2004 by more than two-to-one margins, and like many other rural counties throughout Missouri, Stone County strongly favored John McCain over Barack Obama in 2008. The solitary Democratic presidential candidate to win Stone County since the Civil War has been Franklin Delano Roosevelt in 1932, and even Roosevelt won by only 163 votes out of 3,688.

Like most rural areas throughout the Bible Belt in Southwest Missouri, voters in Stone County traditionally adhere to socially and culturally conservative principles which tend to strongly influence their Republican leanings. In 2004, Missourians voted on a constitutional amendment to define marriage as the union between a man and a woman—it overwhelmingly passed Stone County with 79.87 percent of the vote. The initiative passed the state with 71 percent of support from voters as Missouri became the first state to ban same-sex marriage. In 2006, Missourians voted on a constitutional amendment to fund and legalize embryonic stem cell research in the state—it narrowly failed in Stone County with 52.80 percent voting against the measure. The initiative narrowly passed the state with 51 percent of support from voters as Missouri became one of the first states in the nation to approve embryonic stem cell research. Despite Stone County's longstanding tradition of supporting socially conservative platforms, voters in the county have a penchant for advancing populist causes like increasing the minimum wage. In 2006, Missourians voted on a proposition (Proposition B) to increase the minimum wage in the state to $6.50 an hour—it passed Stone County with 76.72 percent of the vote. The proposition strongly passed every single county in Missouri with 78.99 percent voting in favor as the minimum wage was increased to $6.50 an hour in the state. During the same election, voters in five other states also strongly approved increases in the minimum wage.

==== 2008 Missouri presidential primary ====
Democratic

Former U.S. Senator and Secretary of State Hillary Rodham Clinton (D-New York) won Stone County over President Barack Obama (D-Illinois) by an almost two-to-one margin with 61.76 percent of the vote while Obama received 35.17 percent of the vote. Although he withdrew from the race, former U.S. Senator John Edwards (D-North Carolina) still received 2.16 percent of the vote in Stone County.

Republican

Former Governor Mike Huckabee (R-Arkansas) won Stone County with 45.01 percent of the vote. U.S. Senator John McCain (R-Arizona) finished in second place in Stone County with 31.82 percent. Former Governor Mitt Romney (R-Massachusetts) came in third place, receiving 18.80 percent of the vote while libertarian-leaning U.S. Representative Ron Paul (R-Texas) finished fourth with 2.74 percent in Stone County.

Mike Huckabee received more votes, a total of 2,528, than any candidate from either party in Stone County during the 2008 Missouri presidential primaries.

== Transportation ==
=== Major highways ===
- Route 13
- Route 76
- Route 86
- Route 173
- Route 176
- Route 248
- Route 265
- Route 413

=== Airports ===
Branson West Airport, also known as Branson West Municipal Airport, is a public-use general aviation airport in Stone County. It is located two nautical miles (3.7 km) west of the central business district of the Branson West, which owns the airport.

== Communities ==
=== Cities ===
- Branson (mostly in Taney County)
- Branson West
- Crane
- Galena (county seat)
- Hurley
- Kimberling City (largest city)
- Reeds Spring

=== Villages ===
- Blue Eye
- Coney Island
- Indian Point
- McCord Bend

=== Census-designated place ===
- Shell Knob (partly in Barry County)

=== Unincorporated communities ===
- Abesville
- Browns Spring
- Cape Fair
- Carico
- Carr Lane
- Cross Roads
- Elsey
- Jamesville
- Lampe
- Notch
- Oto
- Ponce de Leon
- Possum Trot
- Reeds Spring Junction
- Union City
- Viola
- White City

== See also ==
- List of sundown towns in the United States
- National Register of Historic Places listings in Stone County, Missouri
