= Logan-Rogersville High School =

Location
- 4700 S. State Hwy 125; Rogersville, Missouri 65742; 37°07′26″N 93°07′04″W

Information
- Type: Public
- Motto: We strive to be Lifelong Learners; Respectful, Responsible, & Focused; High Achievers, and Successful
- School district: Logan-Rogersville R-VIII School District
- Principal: Kathyrn Taylor
- Staff: 49.35 (FTE)
- Grades: 9–12
- Enrollment: 733 (2024–2025)
- Student to teacher ratio: 14.85
- Colors: Maroon and White
- Mascot: Wildcat
- Website: Logan-Rogersville High School

Logan-Rogersville High School (LRHS) is a public high school for grades 9–12 located in Rogersville, Missouri as part of the Logan-Rogersville R-VIII School District. The National Center for Education Statistics classifies LRHS as a "rural fringe" locale, which is defined as a rural area that is less than or equal to 5 miles from an urban area. The mascot of LRHS is the wildcat with the colors of maroon and white.

LRHS was the site for the Guinness World Records largest game of duck, duck, goose with 2,135 participants on October 7, 2011. On May 20, 2020, three high schools in Terre Haute, Indiana (Terre Haute North Vigo High School, Terre Haute South Vigo High School, and West Vigo High School) attempted to break the 2011 record held by Logan-Rogersville School District. However, the attempt was unsuccessful, and Guinness World Records still lists the Logan-Rogersville School District as the holder of the record.

== School statistics ==
The school statistics that follow are comprehensive with available information through 2023. In the most recent year with available data, total enrollment was 740 students with a dropout rate of approximately 2%. The school is predominately white, but the racial diversity has slowly increased over the last fifteen years. The number of economically disadvantaged students (defined as the number of students with a free or reduced lunch) is 24.9%. The student-to-teacher ratio is 15:1, which has remained relatively constant over the years. Teachers are paid an average total salary of $59,527, administrators are paid an average total salary of $102,134, and the average amount of experience for teachers is 13.8 years.

The Logan-Rogersville High School statistics shown in the tables below are from the Missouri Department of Elementary and Secondary Education.

LRHS Enrollment History
Year	9th Grade	10th Grade	11th Grade	12th Grade	Total
1991	110	117	90	105	422
1992	119	111	114	90	434
1993	120	116	120	113	469
1994	133	117	118	108	476
1995	132	136	108	111	487
1996	145	146	130	104	525
1997	116	146	133	135	530
1998	128	122	145	117	512
1999	168	131	126	133	558
2000	141	168	123	132	564
2001	170	135	161	125	591
2002	158	163	127	139	587
2003	150	156	157	130	593
2004	141	150	152	157	600
2005	166	142	137	157	602
2006	154	164	141	130	589
2007	197	147	167	146	657
2008	171	188	138	162	659
2009	179	172	188	132	671
2010	170	172	168	182	692
2011	184	177	170	166	697
2012	181	185	155	156	677
2013	187	173	176	152	688
2014	185	183	173	156	697
2015	168	180	177	156	681
2016	200	162	172	166	700
2017	196	195	176	158	725
2018	168	195	192	151	706
2019	193	168	173	180	714
2020	201	199	162	169	731
2021	170	199	183	157	709
2022	201	168	210	173	752
2023	190	196	175	179	740

LRHS Demographic History
Year	Free or Reduced Lunch	Asian (Note: Entries listed as N/A are due to the Missouri Department of Elementary and Secondary Education not releasing specific demographic information if below approximately 0.60%.)	Asian Pacific Islander	Black	Hispanic	Indian	Multiracial	Pacific Islander	White
1991	N/A	N/A	N/A	N/A	N/A	N/A	N/A	N/A	99.53%
1992	N/A	N/A	N/A	N/A	N/A	N/A	N/A	N/A	99.54%
1993	N/A	N/A	N/A	N/A	N/A	N/A	N/A	N/A	99.36%
1994	N/A	N/A	N/A	13.03%	N/A	N/A	N/A	N/A	86.76%
1995	N/A	N/A	N/A	N/A	N/A	N/A	N/A	N/A	99.79%
1996	15.2%	N/A	N/A	N/A	N/A	N/A	N/A	N/A	99.81%
1997	8.1%	N/A	N/A	N/A	N/A	N/A	N/A	N/A	98.68%
1998	8.5%	N/A	N/A	N/A	N/A	N/A	N/A	N/A	99.02%
1999	7.5%	N/A	N/A	N/A	N/A	N/A	N/A	N/A	98.75%
2000	6.3%	N/A	N/A	N/A	N/A	N/A	N/A	N/A	98.94%
2001	6.8%	N/A	N/A	N/A	N/A	N/A	N/A	N/A	98.98%
2002	7.8%	N/A	N/A	N/A	N/A	N/A	N/A	N/A	99.32%
2003	7.8%	N/A	N/A	N/A	0.84%	N/A	N/A	N/A	98.48%
2004	7.4%	N/A	N/A	N/A	1.33%	N/A	N/A	N/A	98.00%
2005	12.6%	N/A	N/A	N/A	1.66%	N/A	N/A	N/A	97.84%
2006	16.2%	N/A	N/A	N/A	1.53%	N/A	N/A	N/A	97.62%
2007	16.0%	N/A	N/A	N/A	0.76%	N/A	N/A	N/A	98.33%
2008	18.5%	N/A	N/A	1.06%	1.06%	0.76%	N/A	N/A	97.12%
2009	21.0%	N/A	N/A	1.34%	2.09%	0.89%	N/A	N/A	95.68%
2010	25.3%	N/A	N/A	1.30%	1.88%	0.72%	N/A	N/A	95.95%
2011	28.7%	N/A	N/A	1.29%	2.15%	N/A	N/A	N/A	95.55%
2012	27.9%	N/A	N/A	1.18%	2.66%	N/A	N/A	N/A	94.68%
2013	29.4%	N/A	N/A	0.73%	2.91%	N/A	0.73%	N/A	94.91%
2014	30.3%	N/A	N/A	0.72%	2.73%	N/A	0.72%	N/A	95.12%
2015	31.3%	N/A	N/A	0.73%	3.08%	N/A	1.03%	N/A	94.57%
2016	32.1%	0.71%	N/A	0.71%	2.86%	N/A	1.57%	N/A	94.14%
2017	28.6%	N/A	N/A	N/A	2.48%	N/A	2.21%	N/A	94.62%
2018	26.9%	N/A	N/A	N/A	2.12%	N/A	2.55%	N/A	94.90%
2019	25.6%	0.70%	N/A	N/A	1.26%	N/A	3.22%	N/A	94.54%
2020	27.0%	0.68%	N/A	N/A	1.37%	N/A	4.10%	N/A	93.43%
2021	23.1%	0.71%	N/A	N/A	1.27%	N/A	4.09%	N/A	93.51%
2022	17.9%	0.66%	N/A	0.66%	2.39%	N/A	3.32%	N/A	92.82%
2023	24.9%	N/A	N/A	0.68%	2.30%	N/A	2.84%	N/A	93.78%

LRHS Staff Salary and Experience History
Year	Average Teacher Salary (Regular Term)	Average Teacher Salary (Total) (Note: Total teacher salary includes extended contract salary, career ladder supplement, and extra duty pay.)	Average Administrator Salary	Average Years of Experience	Teachers with a master's degree or Higher
2008	$36,770	$40,176	$67,175	11.8	44.5%
2009	$37,618	$42,640	$67,361	12.3	47.8%
2010	$37,392	$42,174	$67,361	12.9	47.6%
2011	$37,532	$42,288	$74,000	13.3	50.3%
2012	$38,005	$42,603	$75,184	14.1	59.1%
2013	$38,647	$43,166	$77,380	14.1	66.8%
2014	$39,046	$43,623	$75,644	13.7	67.7%
2015	$40,014	$45,138	$77,730	13.8	64.4%
2016	$40,706	$45,851	$79,930	13.9	63.4%
2017	$41,185	$45,945	$77,799	14.1	59.7%
2018	$42,756	$47,541	$80,444	14.9	67.0%
2019	$42,146	$47,600	$82,118	14.1	63.8%
2020	$48,690	$53,056	$84,745	14.2	64.6%
2021	$48,153	$53,679	$90,877	14.6	70.1%
2022	$49,755	$55,954	$96,993	14.5	64.7%
2023	$50,036	$59,527	$102,134	13.8	56.9%

== Academics ==
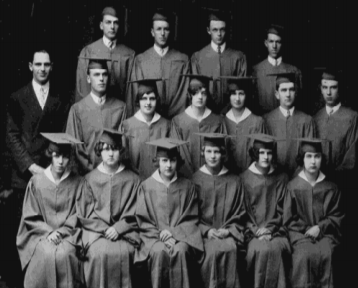
Rogersville Class of 1927

Under LRHS principal Emmett Sawyer, a learning structure study was conducted for the school between 1988 and 1990. The results of the 3-year study concluded that 22% of students preferred very little structure while 20% preferred substantial structure, among other findings. Various learning-style strategies were implemented based on the analysis, which resulted in increased academic performance with students.

In 2000, a Missouri State University academic study was conducted on top LRHS graduates from 1992 to 1999 on analyzing science achievements and attitudes between males and females on pursuing a career in science, technology, engineering, and mathematics. The study found that "there were no significant differences between females and males for ACT and GPA scores" but that "most of the females stated they did not like math and science" while "more males in this study pursued a math and science-related career".

LRHS is one of the first schools in Missouri to have adopted the Missouri Seal of Biliteracy (SoBL), which is awarded to "graduating high school students in districts with a DESE-approved program, who have demonstrated achievement in English, a Language Other Than English (LOTE), and sociocultural competence".

LRHS began CPR training for students during the 2017–2018 academic year, which was required from Missouri Senate Bill No. 711 from the 98th Missouri General Assembly in 2016.

As of spring 2020, the graduation requirements for LRHS require a total of 26 course credits. Specific subject credit requirements are listed below.

- Language Arts (4.0 Credits)
- Social Studies (3.0 Credits)
- Mathematics (3.0 Credits)
- Science (3.0 Credits)
- Practical Arts (2.0 Credits)
- Physical Education (1.5 Credits)
- Fine Arts (1.0 Credit)
- Health (0.5 Credit)
- Electives (8.0 Credits)

== History ==
Logan grade school was established long before 1955. It was a one room school house south of the 4 corner intersection of FR 164 and FR 219, housing grades 1-8. A family member born in 1913 and one born in 1916 attended the school from 1-8th grade. They walked to school from the Logan family farm on what is now J highway. It was land donated by the Logan family.

=== Building and projects ===
The history of the Logan-Rogersville School District has been documented by the Citizen's Bank of Rogersville:

There is no city, village or hamlet named 'Logan'. The Logan family donated the land on Farm Road 164, for the Logan Elementary School, built in 1955. In 1965, the K-8 Logan School District in southeast Greene County consolidated with the Rogersville School District in Webster County, and the combined entity became known as the Logan-Rogersville School District.

On January 27, 2005, a ribbon-cutting ceremony was held for the new 180,000 square foot (17,000 m^{2}) LRHS building. The new LRHS building was funded from a $14.9 million bond issue that passed on April 2, 2002.

The Class of 2010 started the "Preserving the Past for Future LR Generations" senior class photo composite project, which consists of swinging photo panels in the high school commons area. The system contains over 75 years of composites and photos, the oldest being the Class of 1927.

LRHS was awarded a grant for a tornado safe room on December 9, 2013. The grant was part of the Hazard Mitigation Grant Program (HMGP), which was authorized by the Stafford Disaster Relief and Emergency Assistance Act and provides 75 percent of the activity costs from the federal government with the remaining 25 percent being provided by non-federal sources.

The following is a summary of LRHS projects that have received grant funding from the Logan-Rogersville Educational Foundation (LREF).

- Journalism iMac Computer (June 2011)
- Math SMART Response System (June 2011)
- Chromebooks (February 2014)
- Smart TV (February 2016)
- Speech-Language Pathology Forebrain Devices (February 2016)
- PE Gym Timer (February 2017)
- Special Education Smart TV (February 2018)
- Science Vernier LabQuests, Microscopes, and Mini Torsos (February 2019)
- Choir iPads (February 2019)
- School Counselor Instax Cameras (February 2020)
- School Counselor Culture Creators Project (February 2020)
- Library 3D Printer (February 2020)
- Special Education Dell Tablets and iPads (February 2020)
- Visual Arts HP Laptop, Scanner, and Printer (February 2020)
- Esports Computers and Equipment (March 2022)

=== Controversies ===
In February 2014, a vulgar flier was circulated among LRHS students that described a points contest for the winter homecoming dance for accomplishing various sexual acts including rape. School officials were made aware of the flier prior to the homecoming dance, and three students were placed under investigation.

In October 2017, LRHS was the center of controversy due to the "Rogersville Horror Story" fundraiser for the school's Project Graduation, which was a haunted house event in a local funeral home. Critics argued that the event was "distasteful" and that it was "insensitive to use a place of grief and mourning to make a mockery of death" while supporters argued that the "facility has been closed for a while and is slated for demolition" and that the event was worthwhile with "proceeds going toward a safe celebration for seniors on graduation night".

On February 28, 2018, it was reported that a student was planning on bringing a gun to LRHS. After the student was detained and questioned, the threat was deemed as not credible, but additional security was provided from the Rogersville Police Department at LRHS following the threat.

On May 13, 2019, An LRHS student reportedly warned other students not to come to school the following day on May 14. The threat was reported to law enforcement, and after an investigation throughout the prior night, the student was arrested shortly after midnight. LRHS proceeded with caution in providing an additional police presence on May 14.

In June 2021, a former LRHS student filed a lawsuit against the school district and former track coach for a knee injury suffered during high school track practice on May 29, 2018. The lawsuit claimed that the injury was the result of a "dangerous condition" with a "foreseeable risk of harm" with students performing "toe touches both on and off unsecured metal folding chairs on the concrete gym floor".

== Extracurricular activities ==
=== Baseball ===
The LRHS baseball team has placed a total of four times in the MSHSAA State Championship Tournament. The state championship history is summarized in the table below.

LRHS Baseball State Championship History
Year	Class	State Placing	Notes	References
2006	3	–	LRHS was eliminated in the quarterfinals after losing 7–0 to Webb City High School at the Taylor Stadium at the University of Missouri.	
2008	3	–	LRHS was eliminated in the quarterfinals after losing in extra innings 14–14 to Webb City High School.	
2010	3	4th	LRHS placed 4th after losing 13–7 to Pembroke Hill High School.	
2012	3	–	LRHS was eliminated in the quarterfinals after losing 5–4 to Marshall High School.	
2013	4	3rd	LRHS placed 3rd after winning 8–7 against Boonville High School.	
2014	4	3rd	LRHS tied for 3rd place with St. Louis St. Mary's High School after the game was cancelled.	
2015	4	–	LRHS was eliminated in sectionals after losing 14–2 to Carl Junction High School.	
2022	4	2nd	LRHS placed 2nd after losing 8–3 to Southern Boone High School.	
2024	4	–	LRHS was eliminated in sectionals after losing 7–0 to Blair Oaks High School.	

=== Basketball ===
The LRHS boys' basketball team has placed a total of six times in the MSHSAA State Championship Tournament. The LRHS girls' basketball team has placed once in the MSHSAA State Championship Tournament. The state championship history is summarized in the tables below.

LRHS Boys' Basketball State Championship History
Year	Class	State Placing	Notes	References
1941	B	2nd	Rogersville High School lost against Camdenton High School in the championship round scoring 43–34 at the McDonald Arena at Missouri State University. (Note: Rogersville High School existed before LRHS was formed from the consolidation of the Rogersville and Logan School Districts in 1965.)	
1975	2A	2nd	LRHS lost against Lilbourn High School in the championship round scoring 84–66 at the Hearnes Center at the University of Missouri.	
1982	3A	1st	LRHS won against Chillicothe High School in the championship round scoring 61–57 at the Hearnes Center at the University of Missouri.	
1983	3A	3rd	LRHS won against Centralia High School in the third place round scoring 61–47 at the Hearnes Center at the University of Missouri.	
1986	3A	2nd	LRHS lost against Charleston High School in the championship round scoring 44–43 at the Hearnes Center at the University of Missouri.	
2003	4	–	LRHS was eliminated in the quarterfinals after losing 66–48 to Ozark High School at the Hearnes Center at the University of Missouri.	
2006	4	–	LRHS was eliminated in the quarterfinals after losing 46–32 to Ozark High School at the Mizzou Arena at the University of Missouri.	
2009	4	–	LRHS was eliminated in sectionals after losing 66–45 to Helias Catholic High School.	
2018	4	–	LRHS was eliminated in the quarterfinals after losing 81–46 to Grandview High School.	
2019	4	4th	LRHS lost against Ladue Horton Watkins High School in the third place round scoring 52–47.	
2020	4	–	LRHS was eliminated in sectionals after losing 58–57 to Webb City High School.	
2023	4	–	LRHS was eliminated in the quarterfinals after losing 52–35 to Tolton High School.	
2024	4	3rd	LRHS won against Central High School in the third place round scoring 72–44.	

LRHS Girls' Basketball State Championship History
Year	Class	State Placing	Notes	References
2009	4	–	LRHS was eliminated in sectionals after losing 62–45 to St. James High School.	
2018	4	–	LRHS was eliminated in sectionals after losing 27–24 to Carl Junction High School.	
2019	4	3rd	LRHS won against Clyde C. Miller Career Academy in the third place round scoring 54–33.	
2024	4	–	LRHS was eliminated in sectionals after losing 54–40 to Aurora High School.	

=== Choir ===
The LRHS varsity choir performed at Carnegie Hall in 2004, and the choir returned five years later to perform on Memorial Day in 2009 as one of the choruses for Fauré's Requiem in D minor. The LRHS varsity choir performed as the featured choir at Carnegie Hall on March 18, 2018.

=== Clubs and miscellaneous ===
As of 2021, there are 22 active student clubs at LRHS that are listed below.

- Academic bowl
- Archery
- Art Club
- Bass Fishing
- Bowling
- Game Club
- DECA
- FCA
- FCCLA
- FBLA
- FFA
- Future Teachers of America
- GSA
- Key Club
- Lit Club
- Math Club
- National Art Honor Society
- National Honor Society
- Pep Club
- Trap & Skeet
- Student Council
- World Language Club

In 2013, the Supreme Court of Missouri's civic education committee hosted the first statewide Constitution Project, which included competitions in journalism, crime scene investigation, and trial advocacy. LRHS won the Grand Champion Award and the traveling Freedom Cup trophy for the highest overall score. In 2015, LRHS returned to win the Grand Champion Award and Freedom Cup.

=== Cross country ===
The LRHS boys' cross country team has had a total of three runners become individual champions in the MSHSAA State Championship Race, but the team has never placed in the state race. The LRHS girls' cross country team has placed a total of six times in the MSHSAA State Championship Race. The state championship history is summarized in the tables below.

LRHS Boys' Cross Country State Championship History
Year	Class	State Placing	Notes	References
2002	2	–	LRHS finished 5th after finishing the race at the Oak Hills Golf Center in Jefferson City with a total score of 183. Licking High School won the race with a total score of 90.	
2003	2	–	LRHS finished 9th after finishing the race at the Oak Hills Golf Center in Jefferson City with a total score of 183. Herculaneum High School won the race with a total score of 89.	
2004	2	–	LRHS finished 9th after finishing the race at the Oak Hills Golf Center in Jefferson City with a total score of 214. Saint Louis Priory School won the race with a total score of 116.	
2005	2	–	LRHS finished 11th after finishing the race at the Oak Hills Golf Center in Jefferson City with a total score of 287. Cape Girardeau Notre Dame High School won the race with a total score of 66.	
2011	3	–	LRHS finished 11th after finishing the race at the Oak Hills Golf Center in Jefferson City with a total score of 271. Warrensburg High School won the race with a total score of 72.	
2013	3	–	LRHS finished 6th after finishing the race at the Oak Hills Golf Center in Jefferson City with a total score of 194. Potosi High School won the race with a total score of 71.	
2014	3	–	LRHS finished 10th after finishing the race at the Oak Hills Golf Center in Jefferson City with a total score of 236. Festus High School won the race with a total score of 24.	
2015	3	–	LRHS finished 12th after finishing the race at the Oak Hills Golf Center in Jefferson City with a total score of 287. Festus High School won the race with a total score of 47.	
2017	3	–	LRHS finished 14th after finishing the race at the Oak Hills Golf Center in Jefferson City with a total score of 288. Festus High School won the race with a total score of 55.	

LRHS Girls' Cross Country State Championship History
Year	Class	State Placing	Notes	References
1997	3A	3rd	LRHS placed 3rd after finishing the race at the Oak Hills Golf Center in Jefferson City with a total score of 90, losing from tie-breaking procedure with the Duchesne High School team that also finished with a total score of 90. Moberly High School won the race with a total score of 83.	
1998	2A	1st	LRHS placed 1st after finishing the race at the Oak Hills Golf Center in Jefferson City with a total score of 65. Notre Dame de Sion School placed 2nd with a total score of 102.	
1999	2A	1st	LRHS placed 1st after finishing the race at the Oak Hills Golf Center in Jefferson City with a total score of 97. Notre Dame de Sion School placed 2nd with a total score of 107.	
2000	2A	1st	LRHS placed 1st after finishing the race at the Oak Hills Golf Center in Jefferson City with a total score of 80. Visitation Academy of St. Louis placed 2nd with a total score of 89.	
2001	2A	4th	LRHS placed 4th after finishing the race at the Oak Hills Golf Center in Jefferson City with a total score of 132. Herculaneum High School won the race with a total score of 115.	
2002	2	–	LRHS finished 5th after finishing the race at the Oak Hills Golf Center in Jefferson City with a total score of 155. Smithville High School won the race with a total score of 118.	
2003	2	3rd	LRHS placed 3rd after finishing the race at the Oak Hills Golf Center in Jefferson City with a total score of 144. Independence St. Mary's High School won the race with a total score of 105.	
2004	2	–	LRHS finished 6th after finishing the race at the Oak Hills Golf Center in Jefferson City with a total score of 165. Ste. Genevieve High School won the race with a total score of 43.	
2005	2	–	LRHS finished 8th after finishing the race at the Oak Hills Golf Center in Jefferson City with a total score of 220. Ste. Genevieve High School won the race with a total score of 27.	
2007	2	–	LRHS finished 5th after finishing the race at the Oak Hills Golf Center in Jefferson City with a total score of 182. Herculaneum High School won the race with a total score of 69.	
2017	3	–	LRHS finished 14th after finishing the race at the Oak Hills Golf Center in Jefferson City with a total score of 334. Festus High School won the race with a total score of 108.	

=== Football ===
The LRHS football team won the 2011–2012 MSHSAA Class 3 State Championship, defeating John Burroughs School of St. Louis 21–14.

Head football coach Doug Smith announced his retirement after the 2017–2018 football season. Smith was a coach for 32 years, 11 of which were at LRHS. LRHS announced in March 2018 that Mark Talbert was selected as the new head football coach, who was previously defensive coordinator for Fair Grove High School.

The state championship history is summarized in the table below.

LRHS Football State Championship History
Year	Class	State Placing	Notes	References
2008	3	–	LRHS lost in the district championship after losing 26–14 against Cassville High School.	
2009	3	–	LRHS lost in the district championship after losing 21–20 against Cassville High School.	
2010	3	–	LRHS lost in the district championship after losing 20–6 against Cassville High School.	
2011	3	1st	LRHS won the state championship after winning 21–14 against John Burroughs School.	

=== Golf ===
The LRHS boys' golf team has placed a total of four times in the MSHSAA State Championship Tournament while the LRHS girls' golf team has placed three times. The state championship history is summarized in the tables below.

LRHS Boys' Golf State Championship History
Year	Class	State Placing	Notes	References
2011	3	4th	LRHS placed 4th with a total two-day team score of 652 strokes at Silo Ridge Golf Course in Bolivar, Missouri. Pembroke Hill High School won with a total two-day team score of 629 strokes.	
2012	3	4th	LRHS placed 4th with a total two-day team score of 624 strokes at Rivercut Golf Course in Springfield, Missouri. St. Francis Borgia Regional High School won with a total two-day team score of 609 strokes.	
2014	3	2nd	LRHS tied for 2nd with MICDS High School with a total two-day team score of 640 strokes at Fremont Hills Country Club. Pembroke Hill High School won with a total two-day team score of 637 strokes.	
2016	3	–	LRHS finished 7th with a total one-day team score of 344 strokes at Rivercut Golf Course in Springfield, Missouri. MICDS High School won with a total one-day team score of 309 strokes.	
2017	3	1st	LRHS placed 1st with a total two-day team score of 614 strokes at Sedalia Country Club. Saint Louis Priory School finished second with a total two-day team score of 622 strokes. The boys on the golf team were recognized and presented with state champion rings in a ceremony on December 18, 2017.	
2022	3	–	LRHS placed 6th with a total two-day team score of 686 strokes at Sedalia Country Club. Tolton High School won with a total two-day team score of 587 strokes.	
2023	3	2nd	LRHS placed 2nd with a total two-day team score of 632 strokes at Meadow Lake Acres Country Club. Bishop LeBlond High School won with a total two-day team score of 622 strokes.	
2024	3	4th	LRHS placed 4th with a total two-day team score of 618 strokes at Rivercut Golf Course. Summit Christian Academy High School won with a total two-day team score of 590 strokes.	

LRHS Girls' Golf State Championship History
Year	Class	State Placing	Notes	References
2015	1	–	LRHS finished 8th with a total two-day team score of 765 strokes at Twin Hills Country Club in Joplin, Missouri. MICDS High School won with a total two-day team score of 669 strokes.	
2017	1	–	LRHS finished 6th with a total one-day team score of 421 strokes at Columbia Country Club. Cape Girardeau Notre Dame High School won with a total one-day team score of 319 strokes.	
2018	1	4th	LRHS placed 4th with a total two-day team score of 800 strokes at Mozingo Lake Golf Course. John Burroughs School won with a total two-day team score of 701 strokes.	
2019	1	4th	LRHS placed 4th with a total two-day team score of 827 strokes at Fremont Hills Golf Course. Springfield Catholic High School won with a total two-day team score of 628 strokes.	
2020	2	4th	LRHS placed 4th with a total two-day team score of 772 strokes at Meadow Lake Acres Country Club. Springfield Catholic High School won with a total two-day team score of 640 strokes.	
2022	2	–	LRHS finished 8th with a total two-day team score of 835 strokes at Silo Ridge Golf and Country Club. Osage High School won with a total two-day team score of 726 strokes.	

=== Scholar Bowl ===
The LRHS scholar bowl team has never placed in the MSHSAA State Championship Tournament. The state championship history is summarized in the table below.

LRHS Scholar Bowl State Championship History
Year	Class	State Placing	Notes	References
2011	3	–	LRHS advanced to the round-robin stage but did not advance to the final four.	
2012	3	–	LRHS advanced to the round-robin stage but went 1–2 after winning against Diamond High School and losing to Smithville High School and Cape Girardeau Notre Dame High School.	
2013	3	–	LRHS advanced to the round-robin stage but went 0–3 after losing to Saint Louis Priory School, Kirksville High School, and Hallsville High School.	
2014	3	–	LRHS was eliminated in sectionals after losing to El Dorado Springs High School.	

=== Soccer ===
Both the LRHS boys' and girls' soccer teams have never placed in the MSHSAA State Championship Tournament. The state championship history is summarized in the table below.

LRHS Boys' Soccer State Championship History
Year	Class	State Placing	Notes	References
2021	2	–	LRHS was eliminated in the quarterfinals after losing 3–2 to Excelsior High School.	
2023	2	2nd	LRHS placed 2nd after losing 1–0 to Westminster Christian Academy.	

LRHS Girls' Soccer State Championship History
Year	Class	State Placing	Notes	References
2011	2	–	LRHS was eliminated in sectionals after losing 3–0 to Harrisonville High School.	
2019	2	–	LRHS was eliminated in sectionals after losing 4–1 to St. Clair High School.	
2022	2	–	LRHS was eliminated in the quarterfinals after losing 2–0 to MICDS High School.	
2023	2	–	LRHS was eliminated in the quarterfinals after losing 4–2 to Pleasant Hill High School.	
2024	2	4th	LRHS lost against Whitfield High School in the third place round scoring 2–0.	

=== Softball ===
The LRHS softball team has never placed in the MSHSAA State Championship Tournament. The state championship history is summarized in the table below.

LRHS Softball State Championship History
Year	Class	State Placing	Notes	References
2015	3	–	LRHS was eliminated in the quarterfinals after losing 18–7 to Helias Catholic High School.	
2017	3	–	LRHS was eliminated in sectionals after losing 7–3 to Monett High School.	
2019	3	–	LRHS was eliminated in the quarterfinals after losing 13–0 to Helias Catholic High School.	
2020	3	–	LRHS was eliminated in the quarterfinals after losing 4–0 to Sullivan High School.	
2021	3	–	LRHS was eliminated in the quarterfinals after losing 7–0 to Sullivan High School.	

=== Speech and debate ===
LRHS has had two policy debate teams win the MSHSAA State Championship Tournament. Numerous teams and individuals have also placed in the National Speech and Debate Association district tournament in various events and have advanced to the National Speech and Debate Tournament. LRHS state championship and national qualification history is summarized in the tables below.

LRHS Speech and Debate State Championship History
Year	Event	State Placing	Notes	References
2010	Policy debate	1st	Jeff Bess and Samuel Brady representing LRHS won the state championship in policy debate, defeating Thomas Andrews and Benjamin Campbell representing Park Hill High School in the final round on a 2–1 decision.	
2010	Prose interpretation	–	Dustin Howard representing LRHS advanced to the final round and finished 8th in prose interpretation. Katie Smith representing Pembroke Hill High School won the state championship in prose interpretation.	
2013	Policy debate	1st	Joshua Nixon and Christopher Dade representing LRHS won the state championship in policy debate, defeating Spencer Culver and Grant Ferland representing Parkview High School in the final round on a 2–1 decision.	

LRHS Speech and Debate National Qualification History
Year	Event	National Placing	Notes	References
2012	United States Extemporaneous Speaking	–	Joshua Nixon representing LRHS placed in the National Speech and Debate Association district tournament in U.S. extemporaneous speaking and advanced to the national tournament in Indianapolis, Indiana.	
2013	Policy debate	–	Joshua Nixon and Christopher Dade representing LRHS placed in the National Speech and Debate Association district tournament in policy debate and advanced to the national tournament in Birmingham, Alabama.	
2014	United States Extemporaneous Speaking	–	Christopher Dade representing LRHS placed in the National Speech and Debate Association district tournament in U.S. extemporaneous speaking and advanced to the national tournament in Overland Park, Kansas.	
2015	Lincoln–Douglas debate	–	Macy Hankel representing LRHS placed in the National Speech and Debate Association district tournament in Lincoln-Douglas debate and advanced to the national tournament in Dallas, Texas.	

=== Tennis ===
Both the LRHS boys' tennis team and the LRHS girls' tennis team have placed a total of three times in the MSHSAA State Championship Tournament. The state championship history is summarized in the tables below.

LRHS Boys' Tennis State Championship History
Year	Class	State Placing	Notes	References
1999	1A–3A	4th	LRHS placed 4th after losing 5–0 to Pembroke Hill High School at Cooper Tennis Complex in Springfield.	
2000	1A–3A	4th	LRHS placed 4th after losing 5–1 to John Burroughs School at Cooper Tennis Complex in Springfield.	
2003	1	–	LRHS was eliminated in the quarterfinals after losing 5–1 to Springfield Catholic High School at Cooper Tennis Complex in Springfield.	
2004	1	–	LRHS was eliminated in the quarterfinals after losing 5–1 to Thomas Jefferson School at Cooper Tennis Complex in Springfield.	
2008	1	–	LRHS was eliminated in sectionals after losing 6–1 to West Plains High School at Cooper Tennis Complex in Springfield.	
2013	1	4th	LRHS placed 4th after losing 5–0 to Pembroke Hill High School at Cooper Tennis Complex in Springfield.	
2014	1	–	LRHS was eliminated in the quarterfinals after losing 5–1 to Warrensburg High School at Cooper Tennis Complex in Springfield.	
2022	1	–	LRHS was eliminated in the quarterfinals after losing 5–0 to Bolivar High School at Cooper Tennis Complex in Springfield.	
2023	1	–	LRHS was eliminated in sectionals after losing 5–1 to Bolivar High School.	
2024	1	–	LRHS was eliminated in sectionals after losing 5–1 to Forsyth High School.	

LRHS Girls' Tennis State Championship History
Year	Class	State Placing	Notes	References
2002	1	–	LRHS was eliminated in sectionals after losing 5–1 to Bolivar High School at Cooper Tennis Complex in Springfield.	
2008	1	–	LRHS was eliminated in sectionals after losing 5–2 to Springfield Catholic High School at Cooper Tennis Complex in Springfield.	
2009	1	–	LRHS was eliminated in sectionals after losing 5–0 to Notre Dame di Sion School at Cooper Tennis Complex in Springfield.	
2012	1	3rd	LRHS placed 3rd after winning 5–0 against Kennett High School at Cooper Tennis Complex in Springfield.	
2013	1	3rd	LRHS placed 3rd after winning 5–3 against Kennett High School at Cooper Tennis Complex in Springfield.	
2014	1	4th	LRHS placed 4th after losing 5–1 to Villa Duchesne High School at Cooper Tennis Complex in Springfield. Seniors Hannah Nixon and Madison Watts also placed 6th in the MSHSAA Class 1 Doubles State Championship Tournament.	
2015	1	–	LRHS was eliminated in the quarterfinals after losing 5–0 to Bolivar High School at Cooper Tennis Complex in Springfield.	
2016	1	–	LRHS was eliminated in sectionals after losing 5–1 to Springfield Catholic High School at Cooper Tennis Complex in Springfield.	
2017	1	–	LRHS was eliminated in the quarterfinals after losing 5–0 to Springfield Catholic High School at Cooper Tennis Complex in Springfield.	
2018	1	–	LRHS was eliminated in sectionals after losing 5–0 to Springfield Catholic High School at Cooper Tennis Complex in Springfield.	
2020	1	–	LRHS was eliminated in sectionals after losing 5–3 to Bolivar High School at Cooper Tennis Complex in Springfield.	
2022	1	–	LRHS was eliminated in sectionals after losing 5–1 to Notre Dame de Sion School at Cooper Tennis Complex in Springfield.	
2023	1	–	LRHS was eliminated in the quarterfinals after losing 5–0 to St. Michael the Archangel Catholic High School.	

=== Track and field ===
The LRHS boys' outdoor track and field team has had a total of three athletes and two relay teams become champions in the MSHSAA State Championship Tournament. The LRHS boys' outdoor track and field team has placed a total of four times in the MSHSAA State Championship Tournament. The state championship history is summarized in the table below.

LRHS Boys' Track and Field State Championship History
Year	Class	State Placing	Notes	References
1959	C	2nd	Rogersville High School placed 2nd with 15 points at the track and field at the Rollins Field at the University of Missouri. Washington High School in Caruthersville won the competition with 20.5 points.	
1960	C	3rd	Rogersville High School placed 3rd with 14 points at the track and field at the Rollins Field at the University of Missouri. Greenwood High School won the competition with 29.38 points.	
1981	3A	4th	LRHS placed 4th with 30.3 points at the track and field at Reed Stadium at Lincoln University. Fulton High School won the competition with 75 points.	
1999	3A	4th	LRHS placed 4th with 37 points at the track and field at Reed Stadium at Lincoln University. Excelsior Springs High School won the competition with 71 points.	

=== Volleyball ===
The LRHS volleyball team has placed a total of nine times in the MSHSAA State Championship Tournament. The state championship history is summarized in the table below.

LRHS Volleyball State Championship History
Year	Class	State Placing	Notes	References
2000	3A	2nd	LRHS placed 2nd after losing two sets 15–4 and 15–9 at the University of Central Missouri against St. Francis Borgia Regional High School.	
2001	3A	3rd	LRHS placed 3rd after winning two sets 15–10 and 15–9 at the University of Central Missouri against Rosati-Kain High School.	
2006	3	–	LRHS was eliminated in sectionals after losing two sets at the University of Central Missouri against Reeds Spring High School.	
2007	3	–	LRHS was eliminated in the quarterfinals after losing two sets against Reeds Spring High School.	
2008	3	2nd	LRHS placed 2nd after losing two sets against Archbishop O'Hara High School.	
2009	3	3rd	LRHS placed 3rd after winning two sets against Cape Girardeau Notre Dame High School.	
2010	3	3rd	LRHS placed 3rd after winning two sets and losing one set against Cape Girardeau Notre Dame High School.	
2012	3	–	LRHS was eliminated in the quarterfinals after winning one set and losing two sets against Pleasant Hill High School.	
2013	3	–	LRHS was eliminated in the quarterfinals after losing two sets against Carl Junction High School.	
2014	3	–	LRHS was eliminated in the quarterfinals after losing two sets against Helias Catholic High School.	
2015	3	–	LRHS was eliminated in the quarterfinals after losing two sets against Pleasant Hill High School.	
2016	3	4th	LRHS placed 4th after winning one set and losing two sets at the Show Me Center at Southeast Missouri State University against St. Francis Borgia Regional High School.	
2017	3	–	LRHS was eliminated in the quarterfinals after winning one set and losing two sets at the Show Me Center at Southeast Missouri State University against Helias Catholic High School.	
2018	3	1st	LRHS won the state championship against Lutheran High School South after winning both sets.	
2019	3	2nd	LRHS placed 2nd against St. Francis Borgia Regional High School after going 2–1 in sets.	
2021	4	2nd	LRHS placed 2nd against Westminster Christian Academy after going 3–0 in sets.	

=== Wrestling ===
The LRHS wrestling team has placed once in the MSHSAA State Championship Tournament. However, numerous individuals representing LRHS have won championships in the state tournament. The state championship history is summarized in the table below.

LRHS Wrestling State Championship History
Year	Class	State Placing	Notes	References
2009	2	–	LRHS finished 17th after finishing with a total score of 35.5 points. Kirksville High School won with a total score of 146 points. In the 125 weight class, Sam Zimmer representing LRHS placed 1st after winning by major decision over Mike Rodgers representing St. Clair High School.	
2010	2	–	LRHS tied for 14th with Mexico Senior High School after finishing with a total score of 45 points. Platte County High School won with a total score of 149.5 points. In the 130 weight class, Sam Zimmer representing LRHS placed 1st after winning by decision over Joshua Hastings representing Pleasant Hill High School.	
2011	2	–	LRHS finished 23rd after finishing with a total score of 29 points. Oak Grove High School won with a total score of 138 points. In the 189 weight class, Joe Zimmer representing LRHS placed 1st after winning by pin over Cody Philpot representing Sullivan High School.	
2012	2	–	LRHS finished 22nd after finishing with a total score of 33.5 points. Kirksville High School won with a total score of 152.5 points. In the 195 weight class, Joe Zimmer representing LRHS placed 1st after winning by pin over Wesley Freeman representing Grain Valley High School.	
2013	2	–	LRHS finished 19th after finishing with a total score of 32 points. Oak Grove High School won with a total score of 172 points.	
2014	2	–	LRHS finished 18th after finishing with a total score of 38.5 points. Oak Grove High School won with a total score of 163 points. In the 132 weight class, Clay Stine representing LRHS placed 1st after winning by major decision over Brendan Hachtel representing St. Charles West High School.	
2015	2	–	LRHS finished 22nd after finishing with a total score of 19 points. Oak Grove High School won with a total score of 158 points.	
2017	2	–	LRHS finished 15th after finishing with a total score of 39.5 points. Oak Grove High School won with a total score of 142 points.	
2018	2	3rd	LRHS placed 3rd after finishing with a total score of 100.5 points. Mexico Senior High School won with a total score of 122 points. In the 132 weight class, Jay Strausbaugh representing LRHS placed 1st after winning by decision over Jason Landing representing St. Clair High School. In the 145 weight class, Lucas Campbell representing LRHS placed 1st after winning by decision over Brant Whitaker representing Boonville High School.	
2019	2	–	LRHS finished 5th after finishing with a total score of 90 points. Monett High School won with a total score of 145 points. In the 132 weight class, Jay Strausbaugh representing LRHS placed 1st after winning by decision over Joseph Semerad representing Monett High School.	
2020	2	–	LRHS finished 19th after finishing with a total score of 34 points. Monett High School won with a total score of 149.5 points. In the 132 weight class, Jay Strausbaugh representing LRHS placed 1st after winning by sudden victory over Sam Hrabovsky representing Fulton High School.	
2021	2	–	LRHS finished 40th after finishing with a total score of 6 points. Pleasant Hill High School won with a total score of 137 points.	
2022	2	–	LRHS finished 28th after finishing with a total score of 20 points. Pleasant Hill High School won with a total score of 178.5 points.	
2023	2	–	LRHS finished 36th after finishing with a total score of 7 points. Pleasant Hill High School won with a total score of 145.5 points.	
2024	2	–	LRHS finished 21st after finishing with a total score of 31 points. Odessa High School won with a total score of 163.5 points.	

== Notable alumni ==
Name	Class year	Notability	References
Buddy Baumann	2006	MLB pitcher for the San Diego Padres (2016–2018) and New York Mets (2018)	
Dylan Cole	2012	NFL linebacker for the Houston Texans (2017–2020), Tennessee Titans (2021–2022), and Chicago Bears (2023)	
Seth Conner	2010	MLB assistant hitting coach for the Texas Rangers (2022–present)	
Lucas Grabeel (Note: Lucas Grabeel attended LRHS, but he transferred to and graduated from Kickapoo High School.)	2003	Actor best known for playing Ryan Evans in the High School Musical film series	
Crystal Quade	2003	Member (2017–2025) and minority leader (2019–2025) of the Missouri House of Representatives	

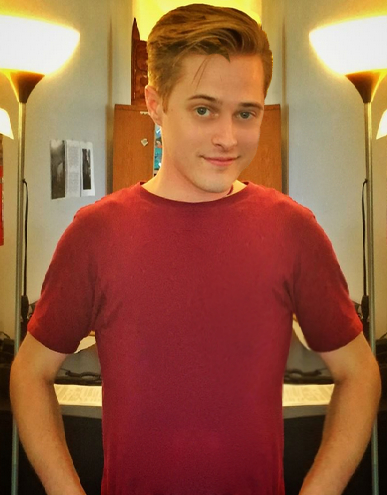
Lucas Grabeel
