= Chris Sander (Missouri politician) =

American politician from Missouri

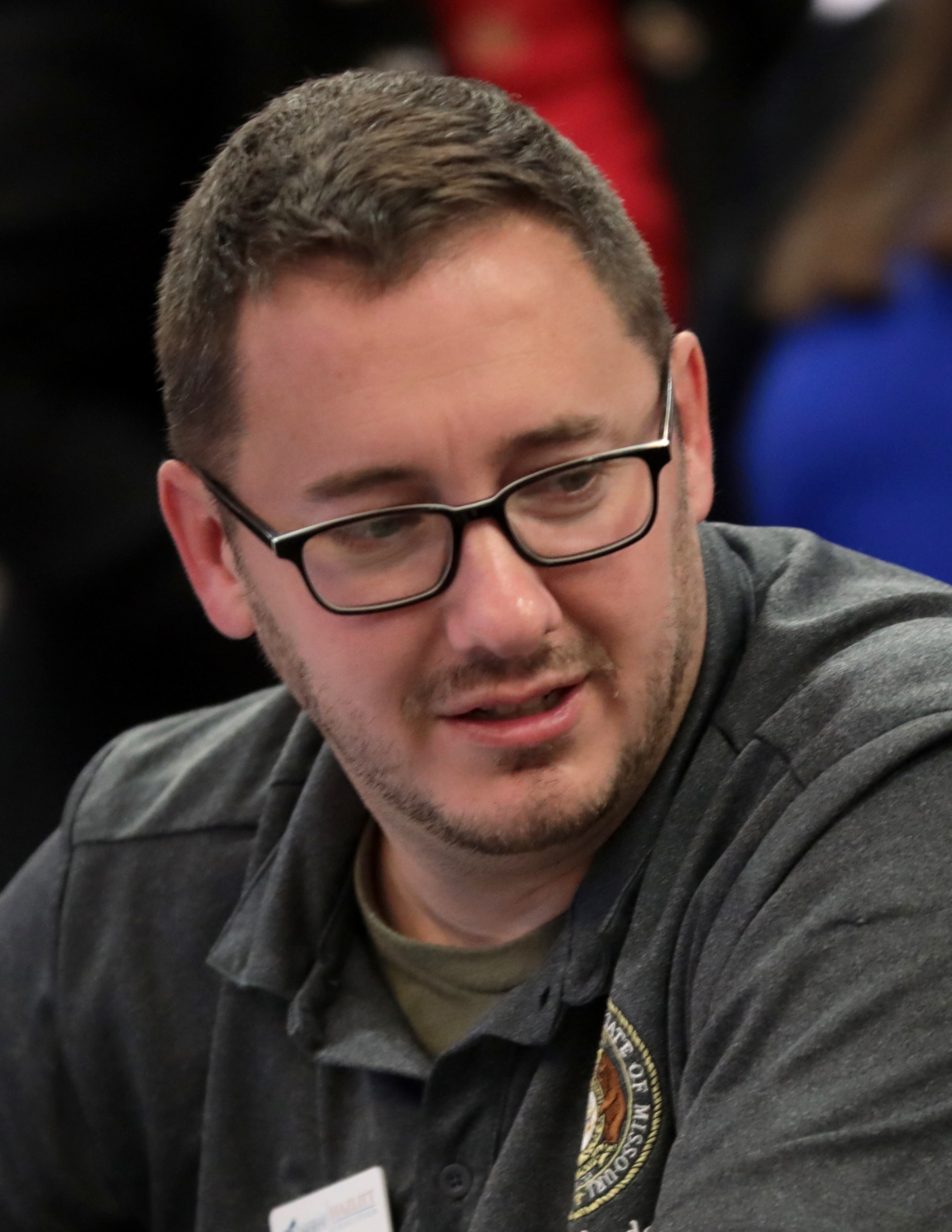
- Sander at the 2022 Hazlitt Summit hosted by Young Americans for Liberty Foundation

Member of the Missouri House of Representatives from the 33rd district
- In office January 6, 2021 – January 8, 2025
- Preceded by: Donna Pfautsch
- Succeeded by: Carolyn Caton

Personal details
- Party: Republican

Chris Sander is an American politician and member of the Missouri House of Representatives from the 33rd district. He was first elected in 2020 and re-elected in 2022, though lost the Republican primary to Carolyn Caton in 2024 after he voted against anti-transgender legislation.

== Missouri House of Representatives ==
Sander is one of two openly LGBT Republicans in the Missouri House of Representatives.

=== Committee assignments ===
- Budget
- Corrections & Public Institutions
- Financial Institutions
- Government Accountability
- Appropriations Office Of Administration

== Electoral history ==
Missouri House of Representatives Primary Election, August 4, 2020, District 33
Party	Candidate	Votes	%	±%
Republican	Chris Sander	3,602	75.98%	
Republican	Alex Holt	1,139	24.02%	
Total votes		4,741	100.00%	

2020 Missouri House of Representatives District 33 General Election
Party	Candidate	Votes	%	±%
Republican	Chris Sander	16,348	100.00%	
Total votes		16,348	100.00%	

Missouri House of Representatives Election, November 8, 2022, District 33
Party	Candidate	Votes	%	±%
Republican	Chris Sander	10,449	100.00%	
Total votes		10,449	100.00%	

Missouri House of Representatives Primary Election, August 6, 2024, District 33
Party	Candidate	Votes	%	±%
Republican	Carolyn S. Calton	2,188	55.8%	
Republican	Chris Sander	1,730	44.2%	
Total votes		3,918	100.0%	
