= Dylan Cole (American football) =

American football player (born 1994)

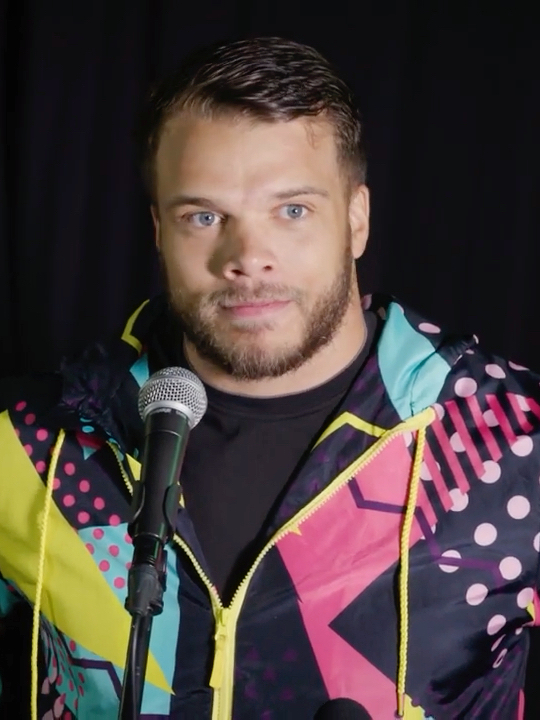
- Cole in 2021

Profile
- Position: Linebacker

Personal information
- Born: May 19, 1994 (age 32); Springfield, Missouri, U.S.
- Listed height: 6 ft 0 in (1.83 m)
- Listed weight: 237 lb (108 kg)

Career information
- High school: Rogersville (Rogersville, Missouri)
- College: Missouri State (2012–2016)
- NFL draft: 2017: undrafted

Career history
- Houston Texans (2017–2020); Tennessee Titans (2021–2022); Chicago Bears (2023)

Career NFL statistics as of 2023
- Total tackles: 151
- Sacks: 2.0
- Forced fumbles: 1
- Fumble recoveries: 1
- Interceptions: 2
- Defensive touchdowns: 1
- Stats at Pro Football Reference

Dylan McKalob Cole (born May 19, 1994) is an American former professional football player who was a linebacker in the National Football League (NFL). He played college football for the Missouri State Bears, and went undrafted in the 2017 NFL draft.

== Professional career ==
Pre-draft measurables
Height	Weight	Arm length	Hand span	40-yard dash	10-yard split	20-yard split	20-yard shuttle	Three-cone drill	Vertical jump	Broad jump	Bench press
6 ft 0 1/2 in (1.84 m)	239 lb (108 kg)	31 7/8 in (0.81 m)	9 3/8 in (0.24 m)	4.54 s	1.52 s	2.58 s	4.19 s	6.82 s	39.0 in (0.99 m)	10 ft 5 in (3.18 m)	32 reps
All values from Pro Day

=== Houston Texans ===
Cole signed with the Houston Texans as an undrafted free agent on May 12, 2017. On October 1, 2017, Cole recorded his first NFL interception and returned it for a touchdown in a 57–14 home win over the Tennessee Titans. He recorded his first career sack as well. On October 15, 2017, Cole made his second career interception in the game against the Cleveland Browns. However, he injured his hamstring in the process of making the interception and had to be carried off the field.

On September 25, 2018, Cole was placed on injured reserve after playing through a dislocated wrist in Week 3 against the New York Giants. He was activated off injured reserve on November 27, 2018.

On November 23, 2019, Cole was placed on injured reserve after suffering a torn ACL in Week 12.

On April 6, 2020, Cole was re-signed to a one-year, $2.133 million contract. He was placed on the active/physically unable to perform list at the start of training camp on July 31, 2020. He was moved back to the active roster on August 16. He was placed on the reserve/COVID-19 list by the team on November 5, and activated five days later. He was placed on injured reserve on November 14, 2020, with a back injury.

=== Tennessee Titans ===
On October 13, 2021, Cole was signed to the practice squad of the Titans. He was released on October 26, then re-signed on November 6. Cole was elevated to the active roster for the Titans Week 10 matchup with the New Orleans Saints. On the kickoff to open the second half, Cole caused a fumble which resulted in a recovery for the Titans. He was signed to the active roster on November 16.

On March 23, 2022, Cole re-signed with the Titans.

=== Chicago Bears ===
On March 23, 2023, Cole signed a one-year contract with the Chicago Bears. He played in 16 games with almost all of his snaps being on special teams.
