= Warrensburg High School =

Location
- 1411 South Ridgeview Drive; Warrensburg, Missouri 64093; United States; 38°44′26.67″N 93°42′40.53″W

Information
- Type: Public
- Motto: Believe, Achieve, Succeed
- Established: 1896
- School district: Warrensburg R-VI School District
- Principal: Bret Pummill
- Faculty: 64.92 (FTE)
- Grades: 9–12
- Enrollment: 1,029 (2023-2024)
- Student to teacher ratio: 15.85
- Colors: Cardinal red and white
- Fight song: Minnesota Rouser
- Athletics conference: Missouri State High School Activities Association (MSHSAA)
- Mascot: Tiger Bob
- Nickname: Tigers
- Rival: Smith-Cotton High School; Harrisonville High School; Clinton High School
- Accreditation: Missouri Department of Elementary and Secondary Education
- Newspaper: N/a
- Yearbook: Arrow
- Website: whs.warrensburgr6.org
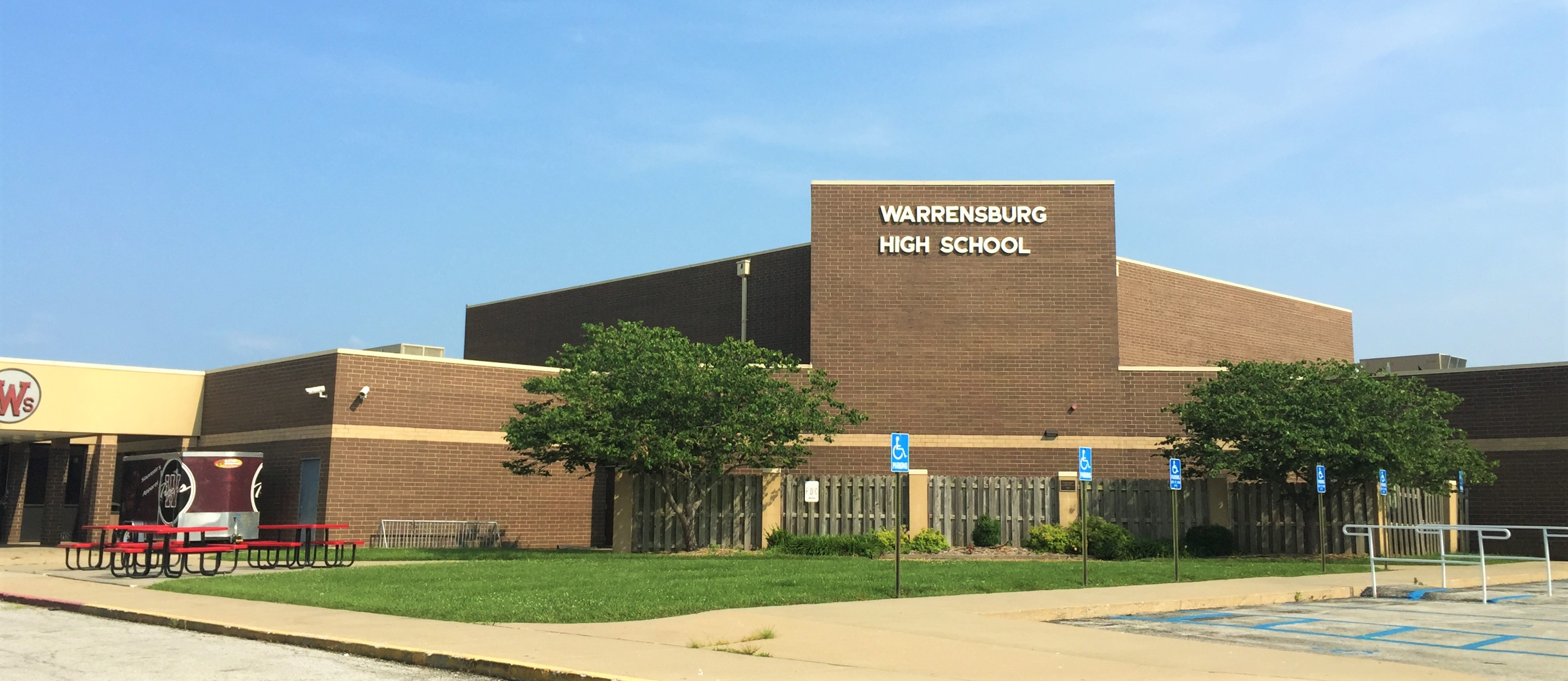
- Exterior view

Warrensburg High School (WHS) is a public high school in Warrensburg, Missouri, United States. The school was established in 1896 and the current facility opened in 1987 as a successor to the building that now houses Sterling Elementary School. It is part of the Warrensburg R-VI School District. As of the 2023–24 school year, the enrollment was 1,029 students.

== History ==
Warrensburg High School opened in 1896 at the corner of Maguire and Grover streets. It was replaced in the 1920s by a new brick junior-senior high school now known as Martin Warren Elementary built in the same location. In the 1960s the senior high was moved to a new location. This building became the Warrensburg Middle school when the high school moved to its current location in 1987 and later became Sterling Elementary after the completion of a new middle school in the mid-1990s. The traditional valedictorian and salutatorian awards were officially discontinued after the graduating class of 2008. The awards were replaced with Latin honors such as summa cum laude, magna cum laude, and cum laude starting with the class of 2009.

== Structure ==
Warrensburg High School runs on a block scheduling format during the hours of 7:30 am to 2:35 pm. This format is structured so that students have four 85-minute-long classes each day with a home room block called Academy in the middle of the day. Prior to the 2025-2026 school year, there were occasional "Collaboration" days, or Collab days for short. They were usually on Wednesdays, where the students were released a couple hours earlier than usual, while the teachers held a meeting inside. This was phased out for the 2025-2026 school year and beyond.

== Athletics ==
Warrensburg High School is classified as a class-4 school by the Missouri State High School Activities Association. The sports at the high school include baseball, basketball, cross-country, football, golf, soccer, softball, swimming, tennis, track and field, volleyball, and wrestling. Most of these sports have both varsity and junior varsity teams, and some of the most popular sports also field freshman teams. The official mascot of the school is the tiger and the official colors are cardinal red and white, though maroon and black have also been used. The Tigers have won five state championships, 32 district championships, and over 50 conference championships.

== Notable alumni ==
- Grant Curtis, producer of the Spider-Man film series
- Shawn Pelton, drummer for Saturday Night Live
- Kimberly Wyatt, former member of the pussycat dolls
