= Josh Smith (left-handed pitcher) =

American baseball player (born 1989)

Free agent
- Pitcher
- Born: October 11, 1989 (age 36); Pleasant Hill, Missouri, U.S.
- Bats: Left Throws: Left

MLB debut
- May 25, 2019, for the Cleveland Indians

MLB statistics (through 2020 season)
- Win–loss record: 0–0
- Earned run average: 6.91
- Strikeouts: 18
- Stats at Baseball Reference

Teams
- Cleveland Indians (2019); Miami Marlins (2019–2020)

Joshua Dwayne Smith (born October 11, 1989) is an American professional baseball pitcher who is a free agent. He has previously played in Major League Baseball (MLB) for the Cleveland Indians and Miami Marlins. Listed at 6 feet 3 inches (1.91 m) and 200 pounds (91 kg), he bats and throws left-handed.

== Amateur career ==
Smith attended Pleasant Hill High School, in Pleasant Hill, Missouri. Smith played college baseball for the Wichita State Shockers baseball team during 2009–2012.

== Professional career ==
=== Pittsburgh Pirates ===
The Pittsburgh Pirates selected Smith in the 25th round of the 2012 MLB draft. During his time in the Pirates organization from 2012 through 2016, he played for the rookie-level Gulf Coast League Pirates, Low-A State College Spikes, Single-A West Virginia Power, High-A Bradenton Marauders, Double-A Altoona Curve, and Triple-A Indianapolis Indians.

=== Boston Red Sox ===
On December 8, 2016, Boston Red Sox selected Smith from the Pirates in the minor league phase of the 2016 Rule 5 draft. In 2017, he played for the Double–A Portland Sea Dogs and the Triple–A Pawtucket Red Sox.

Smith spent the 2018 season split between Portland and Pawtucket, making 30 appearances and accumulating a 9–4 record and 3.14 ERA with 103 strikeouts across 103 1/3 innings pitched. He elected free agency following the season on November 2, 2018.

=== Cleveland Indians ===
Smith signed a minor league contract with the Cleveland Indians on December 1, 2018.

In 2019, Smith began the season with the Columbus Clippers, the Indians' Triple-A affiliate. The Indians selected Smith's contract on May 25, 2019. He made his major league debut that evening against the Tampa Bay Rays, allowing no earned runs and striking out three batters in 1 2/3 innings. Smith was designated for assignment on September 13, 2019, after he appeared in eight games, striking out 12 in 8 1/3 innings with a 5.40 ERA.

=== Miami Marlins ===
On September 14, 2019, the Miami Marlins claimed Smith off waivers. Smith made six appearances with the Marlins, recording an 8.31 ERA and striking out two batters in 4 1/3 innings.

=== Cincinnati Reds ===
On October 16, 2019, Smith was claimed off waivers by the Cincinnati Reds. On July 24, 2020, Smith was designated for assignment by the Reds organization.

=== Miami Marlins (second stint) ===
On July 27, 2020, Smith was claimed off waivers by the Miami Marlins. On August 29, the Marlins designated Smith for assignment.

=== Leones de Yucatán ===
On May 3, 2022, Smith signed with the Leones de Yucatán of the Mexican League. He appeared in 23 games, throwing 23 1/3 innings with an 8.87 ERA and 20 strikeouts. Smith won the Mexican League Championship with the Leones in 2022.

On February 20, 2023, Smith retired from professional baseball.

=== Caliente de Durango ===
On October 1, 2024, Smith came out of retirement and signed with the El Águila de Veracruz of the Mexican League. However, he was subsequently released prior to the season on January 6, 2025, without making an appearance for the team.

== Personal ==
Smith is often referred to online and in print as Josh D. Smith, to differentiate him from Josh A. Smith, especially since the two players were teammates for the Pawtucket Red Sox in 2018. The two were also teammates for the Miami Marlins in 2020.

== See also ==
- Rule 5 draft results
