= Pleasant Hill High School (Missouri) =

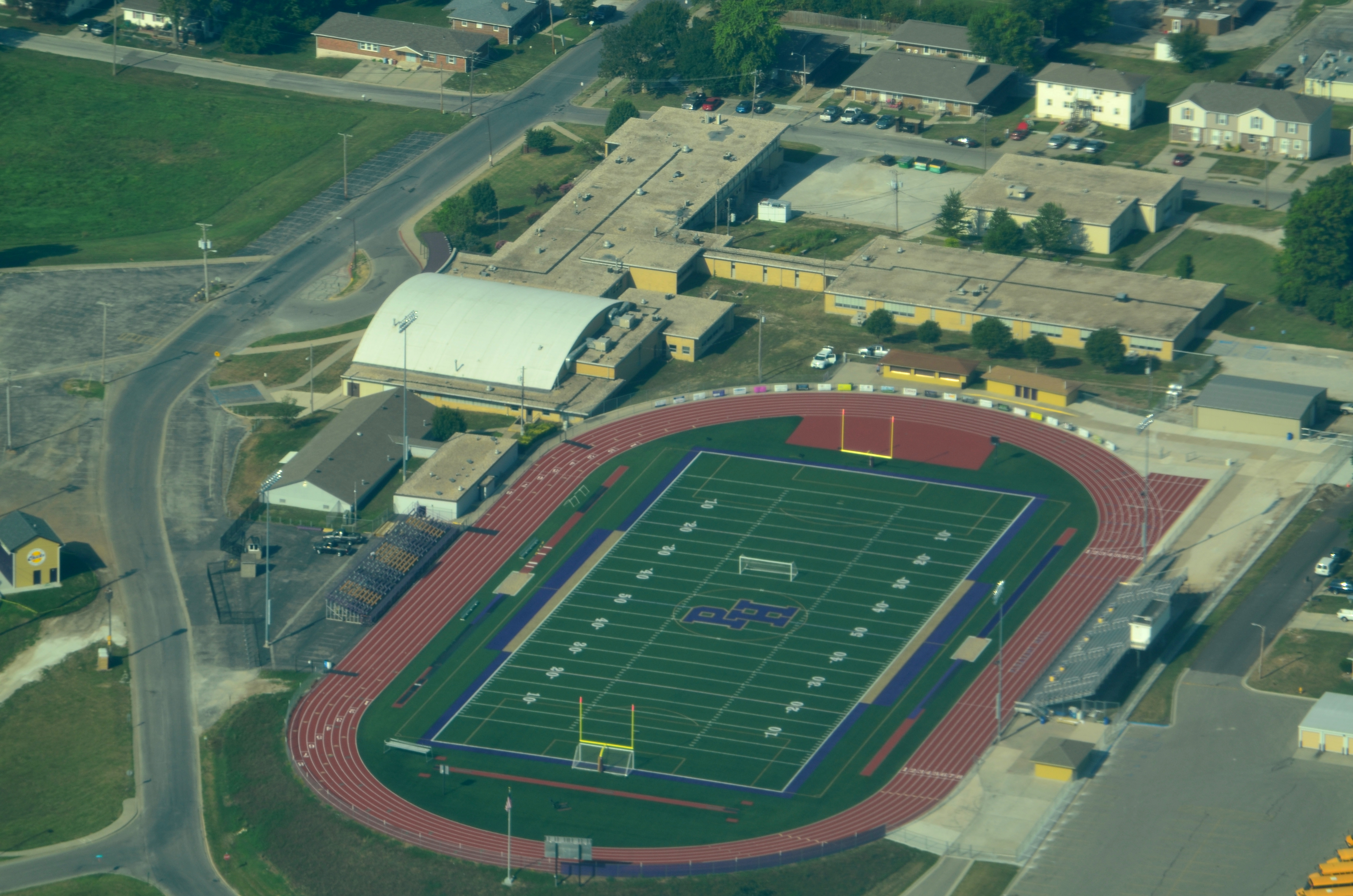
- The football field at Pleasant Hill Middle School

Location
- 1 Rooster Way; Pleasant Hill, Missouri 64080; United States; 38.7866°N 94.2535°W

Information
- Type: Public secondary
- School district: Pleasant Hill R-III School District
- Principal: Dr. Brian Rudolph
- Teaching staff: 45.68 (FTE)
- Grades: 9–12
- Enrollment: 720 (2023-2024)
- Student to teacher ratio: 15.76
- Colors: Purple and Gold
- Athletics conference: Missouri River Valley Conference
- Nickname: Roosters and Chicks
- Website: www.phr3.org/vnews/display.v/SEC/High%20School%20Grades%209-12%7COur%20School

Pleasant Hill High School is a public high school located in Pleasant Hill, Missouri, United States. PHHS serves students in grades 9 through 12 and is the only high school in the Pleasant Hill R-III School District.

== History ==
Pleasant Hill High School was established in 1923. Voters passed a $90,000 bond in spring to authorize the building of a 300-student high school, which was completed that fall.

== Athletics ==
Rooster and Chick athletic teams compete in the Missouri River Valley Conference.

State Championships
Sport	Year(s)
Softball	2000, 2001
Wrestling (boys)	1989, 1996, 2021, 2022, 2023

== Performing arts ==
PHHS has four competitive show choirs: the mixed-gender "Hillside Singers" and "Hillsound", the all-female "Hilltop Harmony" and the all-male "Powerhouse". Hillside Singers' 2020 season included four grand championships. The program also hosts an annual competition, the Battle of the Best.

== Notable alumni ==
- Donna Pfautsch, legislator
- Steve Shifflett, baseball player
- Josh Smith, baseball player
