= Jamaal Tatum =

American basketball player (born 1984)

Personal information
- Born: September 13, 1984 (age 42) Jefferson City, Missouri, U.S.
- Listed height: 6 ft 2 in (1.88 m)
- Listed weight: 175 lb (79 kg)

Career information
- High school: Helias Catholic (Jefferson City, Missouri)
- College: Southern Illinois (2003–2007)
- NBA draft: 2007: undrafted
- Playing career: 2008–2011
- Position: Guard

Career history
- 2008–2009: Idaho Stampede
- 2009–2010: Cholet Basket
- 2010: BK Ventspils
- 2010–2011: Gloria Giants Düsseldorf

Career highlights
- MVC Player of the Year (2007)

Jamaal Tatum a.k.a. Jamaal Tatoum (born September 13, 1984) is an American professional basketball guard. He is 6'2" and 175 pounds (1.88 m, 80 kg).

== High school career ==
As a high schooler, Tatum was a finalist as the Missouri Mr. Basketball. He was the leading scorer at Helias Catholic High School in Jefferson City, where he set the school record for points in a game (46). Tatum also lettered in football as a sophomore and soccer as a freshman.

Tatum's father is a professor of art at Lincoln University and his mother is the supervisor of Jefferson City Public Schools.

== College career ==
A star basketball player at Southern Illinois, Tatum was known for his quickness and long-range shooting. In his freshman season, he was second in the Missouri Valley Conference in three-point shooting (45.6%).

As a junior, he led the team in scoring (15 ppg) and received various Missouri Valley Conference awards. He led the Salukis back to prominence and took them to the 2006 NCAA Tournament. An #11 seed, they lost to West Virginia in the first round. Tatum was named his team's CBS Player of the Game.

In his final season as a Saluki, Tatum was named Missouri Valley Conference Player of the Year. Along with fellow senior Tony Young and star junior Randal Falker, Tatum brought the team high into the AP and coaches' poll, with a 27–6 record (including the MVC Tournament) and an RPI of #7 in the country, ahead of such powerhouses as Memphis (#8) and Kansas (#11). The Salukis received a #4 seed in the 2007 NCAA Tournament and easily beat Holy Cross in the first round. In the second round, they beat #5 seed Virginia Tech, 63–48, reaching 29 wins on the season. Tatum had 21 points and was 7-for-15 from field-goal range. In the third round, they lost to top-seeded Kansas, 61–58. Tatum shot well late and finished with 19 points.

== Professional career ==
In 2007, Tatum signed a non-guaranteed contract with the Atlanta Hawks. he played with them during training camp, but did not earn a spot on the final roster. He was drafted 4th overall in the D-League draft by the Idaho Stampede but was waived before he played in a game due to injury. On August 27, 2008, he signed a non-guaranteed contract with the Portland Trail Blazers, who waived him on October 17. Tatum rejoined the Idaho Stampede for the 2008–2009 season, playing 49 games and starting 5. He finished the season third on the team in total points and seventh in scoring average, posting 11.8 points and 4.0 assists per game in 26.5 minutes. Tatum led the team with 8 assists in their first-round playoff loss to the Austin Toros.

=== The Basketball Tournament (TBT) (2017–present) ===
In the summer of 2017, Tatum played in The Basketball Tournament on ESPN for Team Fredette. He competed for the $2 million prize, and for Team Fredette, he scored five points in their first-round game, which they lost to Team Utah (Utah Alumni) 100–97.

== Coaching career ==
Tatum continues to coach in the greater Tucson area with the private coaching service, CoachUp.
