= Brendan Vintedge =

American singer

- Genres: R&B, dance, chill-out
- Occupation: Singer-song writer
- Instrument: Singing
- Years active: 2008–present

Brendan Vintedge is an American singer-songwriter and entrepreneur, who made it to the top 30 on the sixth season of American Idol. His musical genres are electronic dance music, popular music, rhythm and blues, chill-out music, trap music, electro house, and dubstep. In 2013, he licensed his works "2nd Chance" and "Kissin Away" to TV show R&B Divas starring Faith Evans and Syleena Johnson. The same year, he signed with Spectrum Talent Agency alongside notable artists such as Kelly Rowland, Blu Cantrell, Deborah Cox, SWV, Doug E. Fresh and more.

Brendan has several electro house releases under such labels as System Recordings, Kolour Recordings (Bernard Jones III), Muzique Boutique, Lost My Dog, Loud East Records, and a remix of his 2009 release Beautiful Connection by Om Records Artist/DJ Fred Everything which charted on the Dance/Electronic Albums in 2010.

== Early life ==
Brendan was born in Warrensburg, Missouri, and moved with his mother, Lelia Williams, to Oakland, California at the age of 1. He began singing, playing drums, percussion and piano as a young child. At the age of 7 he relocated back to the Midwest (Columbia, Missouri) where he was able to establish a strong musical foundation by singing in the local choir, which his mother directed. At the age of 12 he began playing drums for a traveling gospel group "Soul Winners". He acquired a love for the arts and began drawing and painting while in high school. In 2006, he auditioned for the sixth season of American Idol in Memphis, Tennessee at the FedEx Forum with 18,000 other hopefuls. Out of Memphis he and 15 others emerged with a chance to continue on to the Hollywood rounds. In 2007 he took the next step in his career by moving to New York City to pursue his musical career.

== Background ==
In 2008, Brendan was scouted by production company Moonlight Entertainment/Green Ocean Media, and signed as one of the first artists for the anticipated record label of Tommy Hilfiger in New York City. The label never became a success, so Brendan was forced to create other opportunities for himself. In 2009 he released his highly anticipated album "Private Symphony" with Australian digital label Blue Pie Records in hopes to establish a more global fan base.. Brendan is currently living in Manhattan while working with Spectrum Talent Agency to establish more exposure.
