= Seth Conner =

American baseball coach (born 1992)

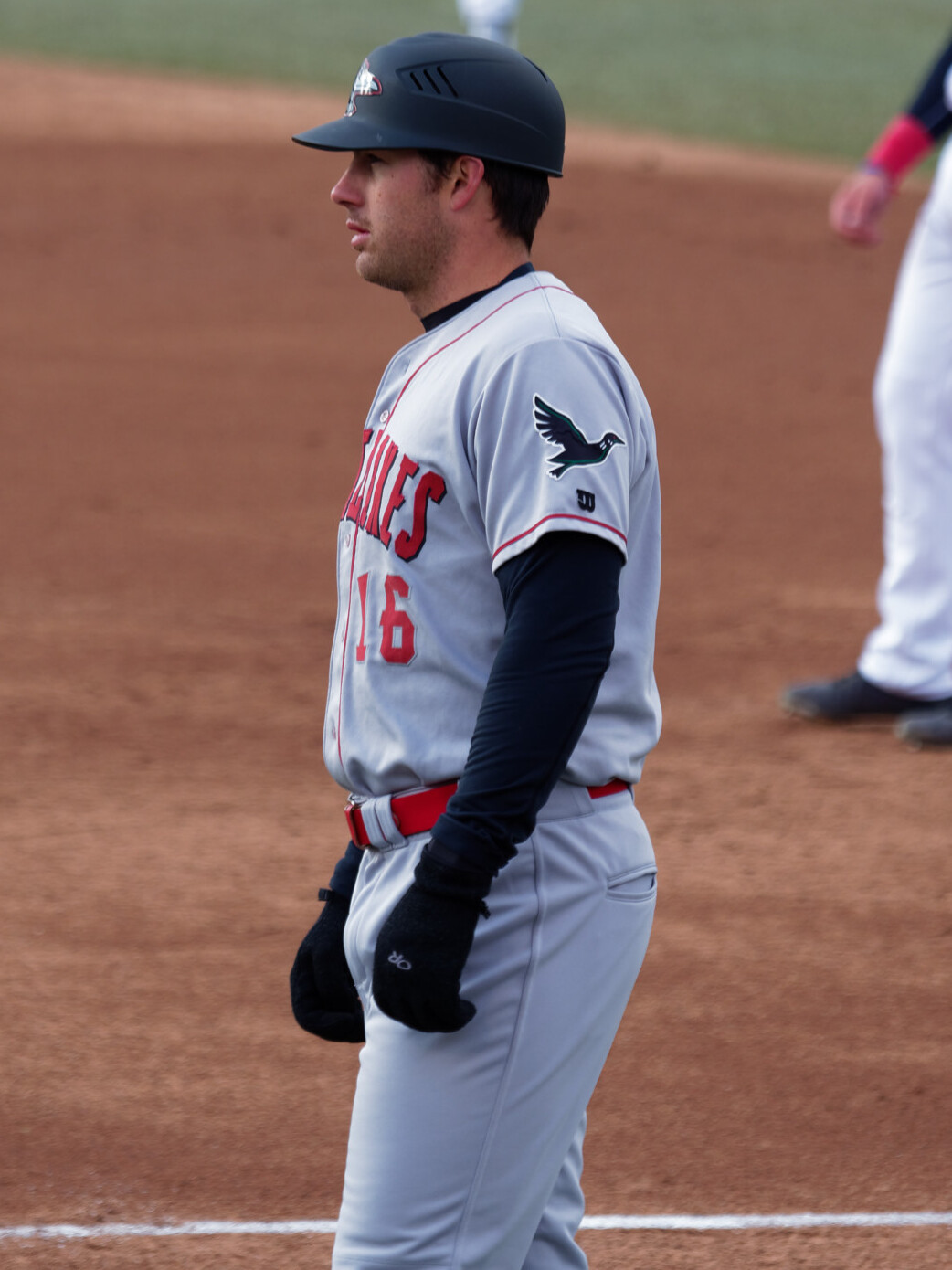
- Conner coaching for the Great Lakes Loons in 2018
- Hitting coach
- Born: January 29, 1992 (age 34); Rogersville, Missouri, U.S.
- Bats: Right Throws: Right
- Stats at Baseball Reference

Teams
- Texas Rangers (2022–2025)

Career highlights and awards
- World Series champion (2023)

Seth Conner (born January 29, 1992) is an American professional baseball coach. He has previously coached in Major League Baseball (MLB) for the Texas Rangers.

== Playing career ==
Conner attended Logan-Rogersville High School in Rogersville, Missouri. He was drafted by the Toronto Blue Jays in the 41st round of the 2010 MLB draft and signed with them. Conner spent the 2010 through 2016 season in the Toronto system, playing for the GCL Blue Jays, Bluefield Blue Jays, Vancouver Canadians, Lansing Lugnuts, and the New Hampshire Fisher Cats.

== Coaching career ==
Conner began his coaching career in the Los Angeles Dodgers organization in 2017. He was an assistant coach for the Great Lakes Loons in 2018. He served as the hitting coach for the Ogden Raptors in 2019. He was set to be the hitting coach for Great Lakes in 2020 before the cancellation of the Minor League Baseball season due to the COVID-19 pandemic. He joined the Minnesota Twins organization and served as the hitting coach for the Florida Complex League Twins in 2021.

On January 6, 2022, Conner was named the assistant hitting coach of the Texas Rangers. Conner left the Rangers organization following the 2025 season.
