= Carolyn Caton =

American politician

Member of the Missouri House of Representatives from the 33rd district
- Incumbent
- Assumed office January 8, 2025
- Preceded by: Chris Sander

Personal details
- Born: Kansas City, Missouri, U.S.
- Party: Republican
- Website: carolynformo.co

Carolyn Caton is an American politician who was elected member of the Missouri House of Representatives for the 33rd district in 2024.

She was born in Kansas City, Missouri. Caton was secretary for the Jackson County Republican Party.

She defeated Chris Sander in the Republican primary in 2024.
