= Ozark High School (Missouri) =

Location
- 1350 W. Bluff Drive; Ozark, Missouri 65721; United States; 37°02′00″N 93°12′29″W

Information
- Type: Public high school
- Motto: "Student Dedicated Everyday, Student-Driven in Every Way"
- Established: March 14, 1922; 104 years ago
- Superintendent: Lori Wilson
- Teaching staff: 119.82 (on an FTE basis)
- Grades: 9-12
- Gender: Co-educational
- Enrollment: 1,789 (2024–2025)
- Student to teacher ratio: 14.93
- Campus size: 39.27 acres (15.89 ha)
- Campus type: Suburban
- Colors: Red, white and black
- Mascot: Ozzie The Tiger
- Nickname: Tigers
- Rival: Nixa Highschool
- Newspaper: Tiger Talk
- Yearbook: Ozarkamo
- Website: ohs.ozarktigers.org

Ozark High School is a High School in Ozark, Missouri.

== Athletics ==
=== Football ===
State Championships
Class 4A State Championship 1998	Helias Crusaders	37	Ozark Tigers	12
