= St. Mary's High School (Independence, Missouri) =

Location
- 622 North Main Street; Independence, (Jackson County), Missouri 64050; United States; 39°5′49″N 94°24′58″W

Information
- Type: Private, Coeducational
- Religious affiliation: Roman Catholic
- Established: 1853
- Closed: 2013
- Superintendent: Marlon de la Torre
- Principal: Jeff Lynch
- Chaplain: Fr. Ron Verhaeghe
- Grades: 9–12
- Colors: Royal Blue and White
- Mascot: Trojan
- Team name: Trojans
- Rival: Van Horn High School
- Accreditation: North Central Association of Colleges and Schools

St. Mary's Bundschu Memorial High School was a private, Roman Catholic high school in Independence, Missouri. It was located in the Roman Catholic Diocese of Kansas City-Saint Joseph. Due to declining enrollment, the diocese announced the school would close at the end of the 2012–13 school year.

The team mascot of the school was the Trojan and the school colors were white and royal blue.

== History ==
St. Mary's Bundschu Memorial High School was established in 1853, making it one of earliest-established high schools west of the Mississippi River.

Before closing, St. Mary's had shifting sports rivalries. For at least 20 years, St. Mary's main sports rival was St. Pius X High School; that rivalry ended when St. Mary's expanded its enrollment. Another rival was Grain Valley High School; it ended when St. Mary's enrollment fell to 200 students. In 2010, Van Horn High School, joined the Independence School District and became a member of the Crossroads Conference. The two schools first met on the football field in September 2010 for the St. Mary's homecoming football game.

Early in 2012, the diocese announced the acquisition of an 80-acre (32 ha) tract of land in western Lee's Summit for the site of a new $30 million Catholic high school. The acquisition was part of plan to replace both St. Mary's and Archbishop O'Hara High School. The new school, St. Michael the Archangel High School, opened in 2017.

== Student life ==
In 2013, there were about one hundred students attending Saint Mary's. Students participate in Food For Thought (food drive) in the fall and the spring. Students also celebrated Homecoming and Courtwarming weeks with dress-up and spirit days.

Students participated in extracurricular activities such as Art Club, Pro-Life Club, National Honor Society, Spanish Club, Academic Team, Student Council, Science Club, Spirit Club and others.

Electives included art classes such as pottery, mixed media, Art 2, and drawing; music and Cantori (choir); creative writing, newspaper, yearbook, office development, introduction to business, and others.

Saint Mary's was in the Crossroads Conference. Students participated in football, volleyball, basketball (boys and girls), baseball, wrestling, soccer, cross country, and track and field.

== Uniforms ==
Students were required to wear uniforms. Girls could wear navy, white, or maroon polos with a khaki, navy, gray plaid, or red and blue plaid skirt. Boys could wear navy, white, or maroon polos with khaki or navy pants or shorts. Girls were also allowed to wear pants and shorts.
