= Warrensburg, Missouri =

City in Missouri, U.S.

- City
- City of Warrensburg
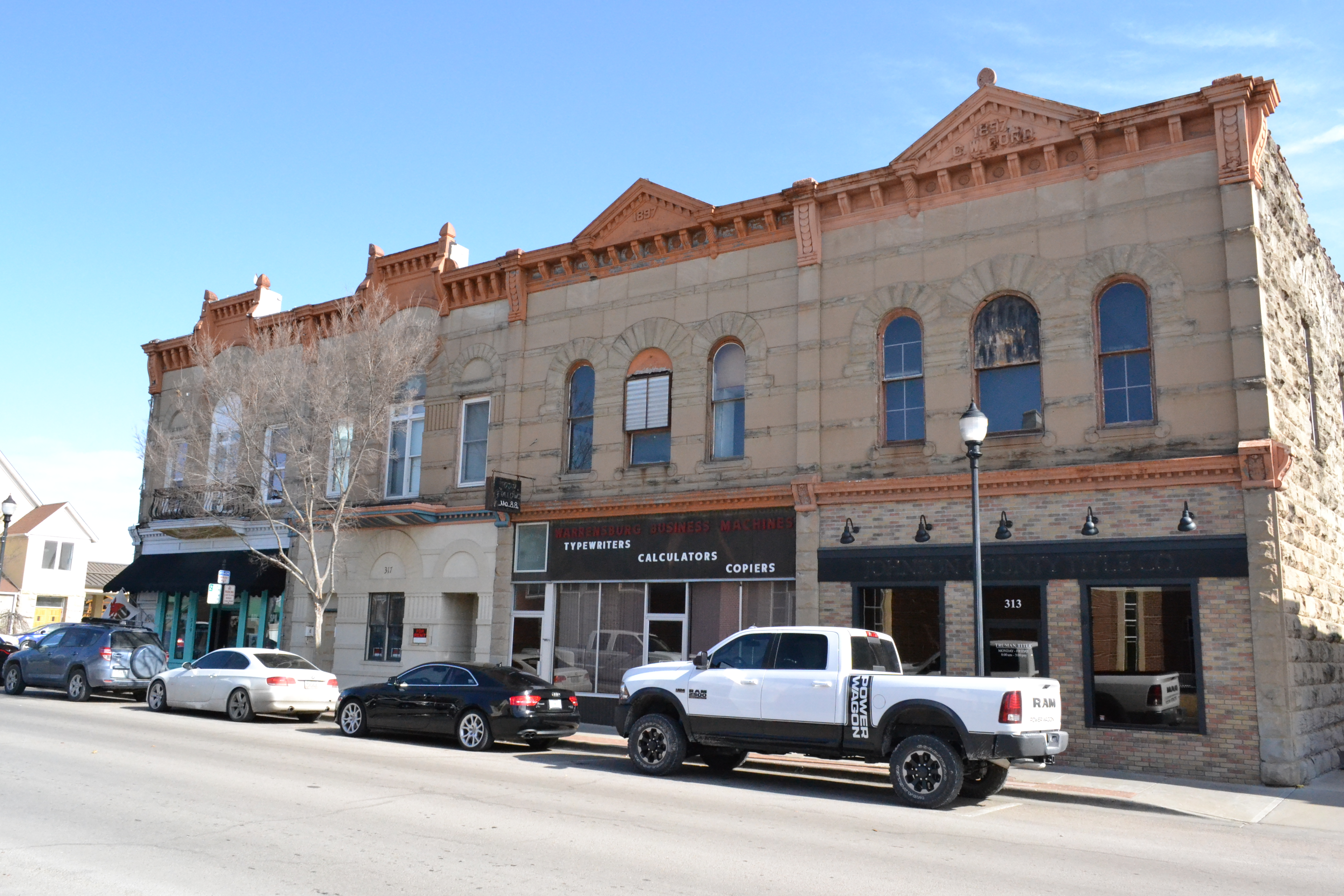
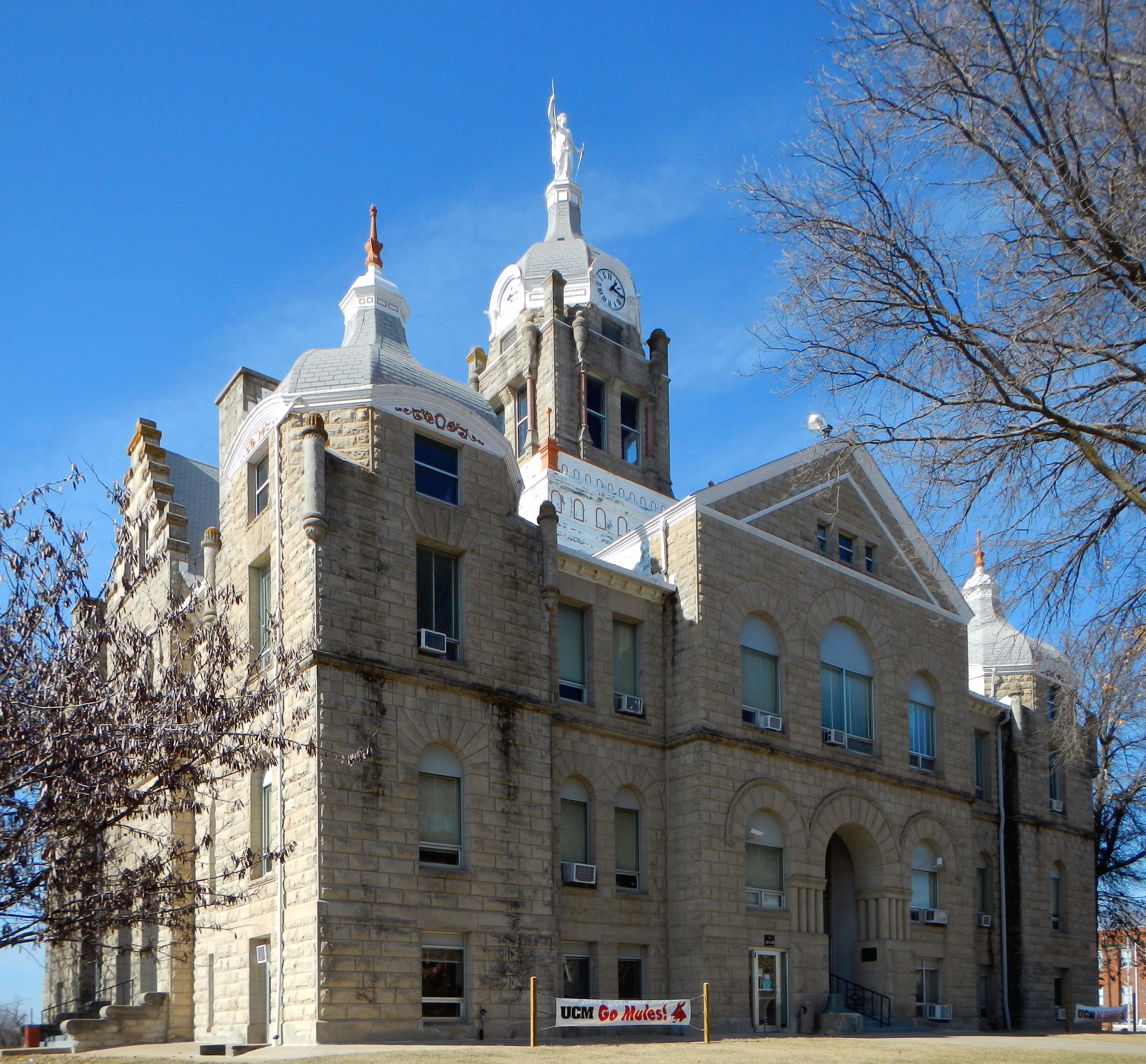
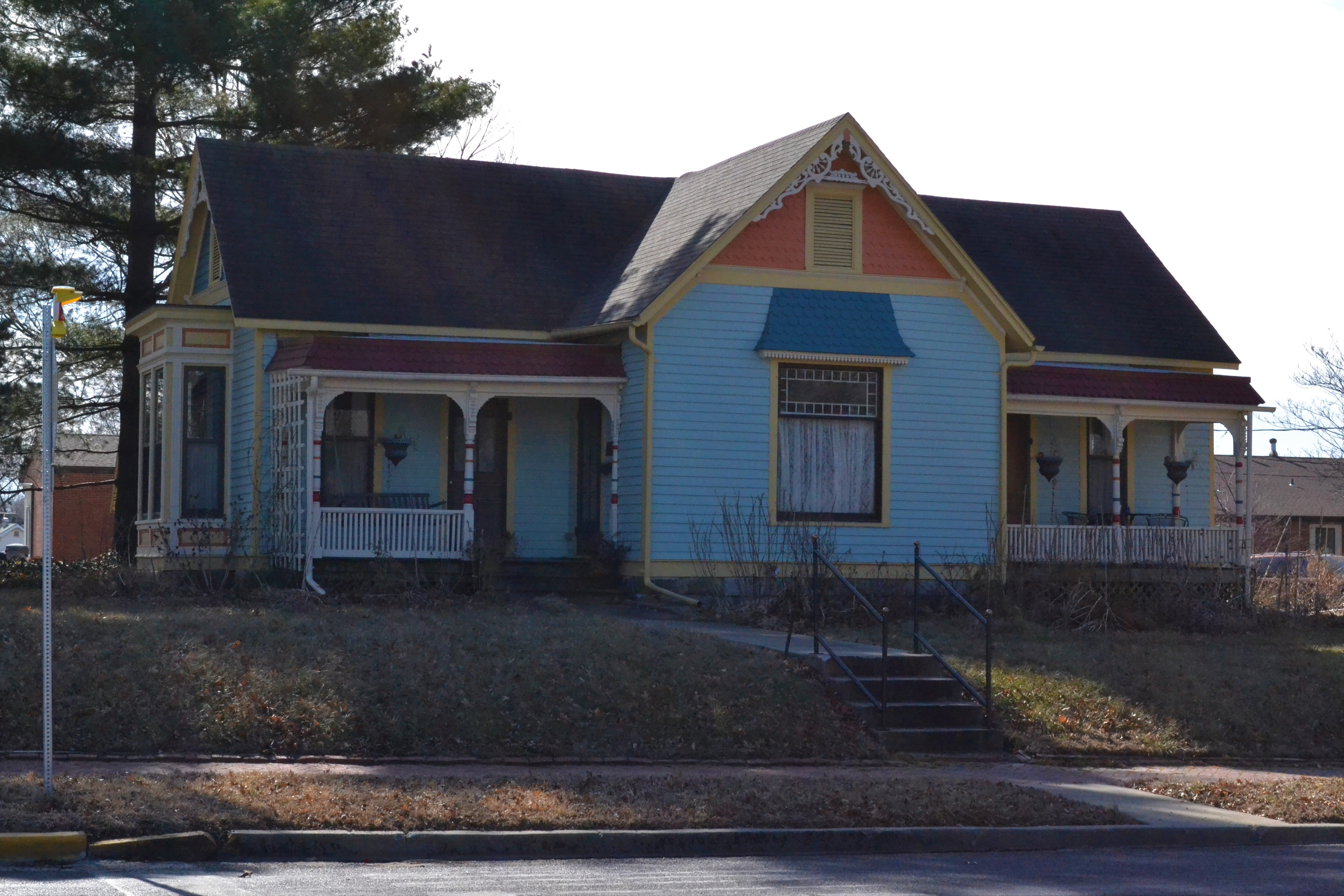
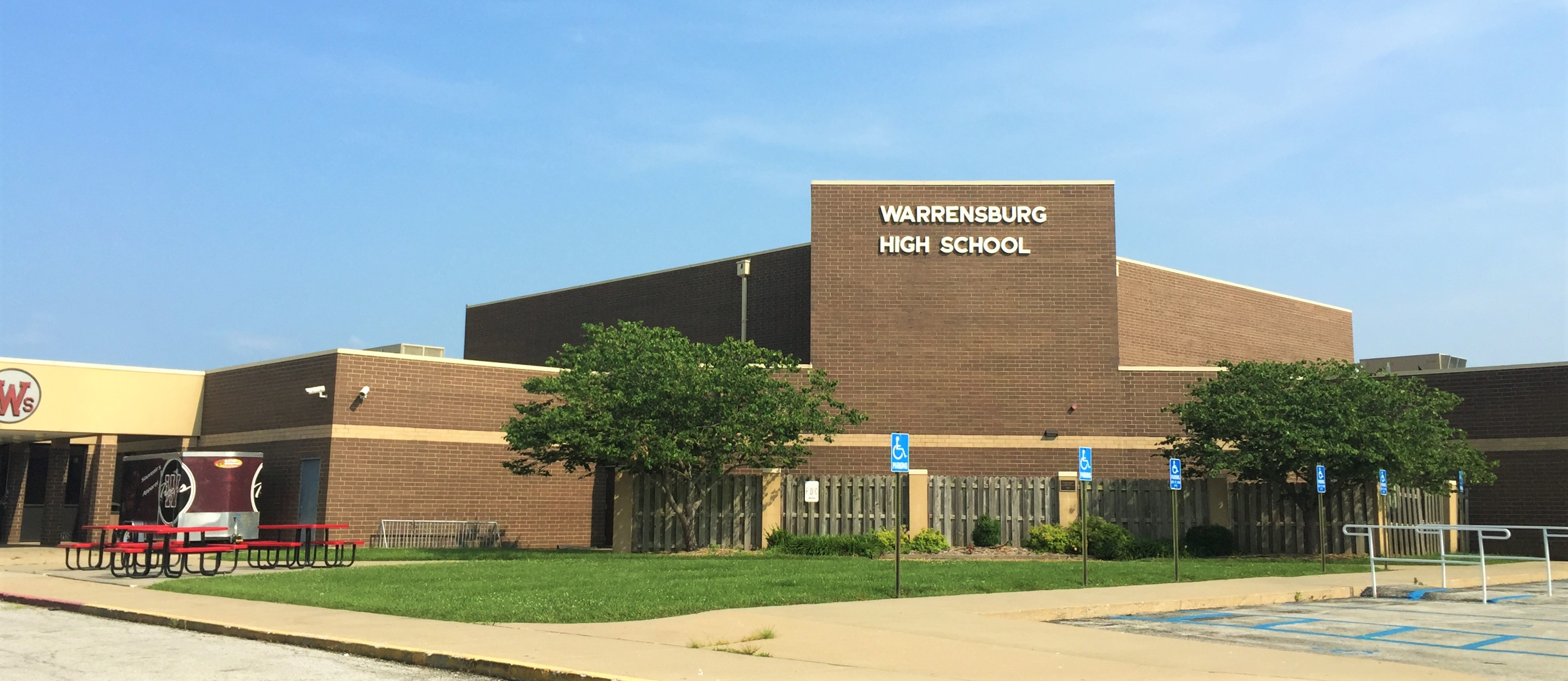
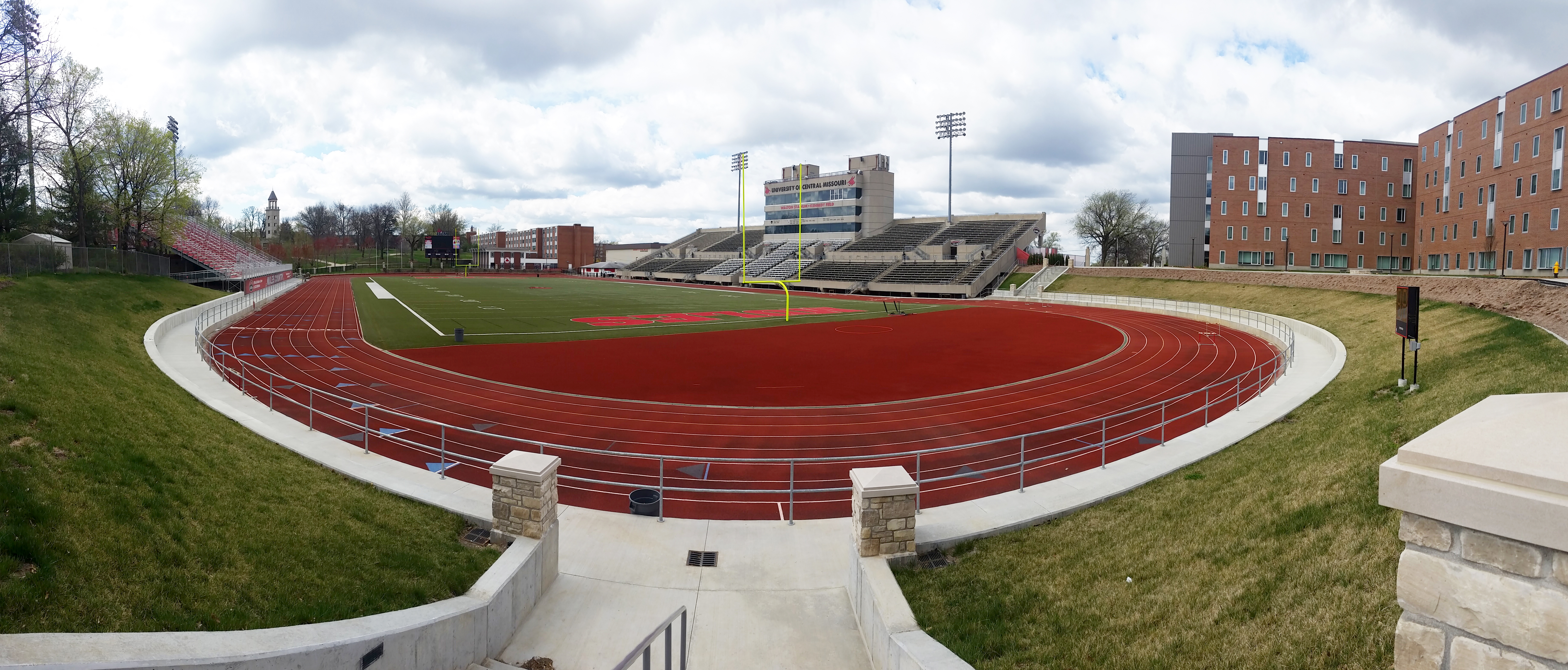
- Downtown Warrensburg Johnson County Courthouse Griebel House Warrensburg High School Audrey J. Walton Stadium

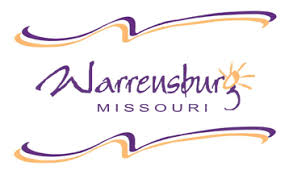
- Flag
- Nickname: The Burg
- Location of Warrensburg, Missouri
- Coordinates: 38°45′46″N 93°44′10″W
- Country: United States
- State: Missouri
- County: Johnson
- Founded: 1835
- Incorporated: 1837

Area
  - Total: 9.47 sq mi (24.53 km^{2})
  - Land: 9.41 sq mi (24.36 km^{2})
  - Water: 0.066 sq mi (0.17 km^{2})
- Elevation: 820 ft (250 m)

Population (2020)
  - Total: 19,337
  - Density: 2,055.6/sq mi (793.69/km^{2})
- Time zone: UTC-6 (CST)
  - Summer (DST): UTC-5 (CDT)
- ZIP code: 64093
- Area code: 660
- FIPS code: 29-77092
- GNIS feature ID: 2397195
- Website: www.warrensburg-mo.com

Warrensburg is a city in and the county seat of Johnson County, Missouri, United States. Its population was 20,313 at the 2020 census. It is located 10.35 miles (16.66 km) near Whiteman Air Force Base. The Warrensburg micropolitan statistical area consists of Johnson County. The city is a college town; it is home to the University of Central Missouri.

== History ==
Warrensburg was founded in 1835 by European-American settlers John and Martin D. Warren, who gave the town their last name. A post office called Warrensburg has been in operation since 1837.

One folk etymology of the phrase "Man's best friend" places the origin of the phrase in a famous trial over the killing of Old Drum, a dog that was shot in Warrensburg. In 1958, a statue of Old Drum was erected on the Johnson County Courthouse lawn containing a summation of US Senator George G. Vest's closing speech, “A man’s best friend is his dog.”

== Demographics ==
Historical population
Census	Pop.	Note	%±
1850	241		—
1860	982		307.5%
1870	2,945		199.9%
1880	4,049		37.5%
1890	4,706		16.2%
1900	4,724		0.4%
1910	4,689		−0.7%
1920	4,811		2.6%
1930	5,146		7.0%
1940	5,868		14.0%
1950	6,857		16.9%
1960	9,689		41.3%
1970	13,125		35.5%
1980	13,807		5.2%
1990	15,244		10.4%
2000	16,340		7.2%
2010	18,838		15.3%
2020	19,337		2.6%
U.S. Decennial Census

The current mayor is Jim Kushner.

=== Racial and ethnic composition ===
Race and ethnicity
Racial Composition	2017	2010	2000
Non-Hispanic White	81.0%	85.3%	86.9%
Black or African American	8.0%	7.5%	6.46%
Hispanic or Latino	3.4%	3.1%	2.44%
Asian	2.9%	2.8%	2.79%
American Indian	1.1%	0.5%	0.64%
Pacific Islander	0.1%	0.2%	0.14%
Other	0.2%	0.7%	0.78%

=== 2020 census ===
As of the 2020 census, Warrensburg had a population of 19,337. The median age was 25.5 years; 19.1% of residents were under 18, 33.6% were between 18 and 24, 24.5% were from 25 to 44, 16.0% were from 45 to 64, and 11.2% were 65 or older. For every 100 females there were 100.5 males, and for every 100 females age 18 and over there were 98.3 males age 18 and over.

99.2% of residents lived in urban areas, while 0.8% lived in rural areas.

There were 7,116 households and 3,418 families in the city; 27.4% of households had children under 18 living in them. Of all households, 36.2% were married-couple households, 25.8% were households with a male householder and no spouse or partner present, and 29.2% were households with a female householder and no spouse or partner present. About 35.7% of households were made up of individuals, and 9.2% had someone living alone who was 65 years of age or older. The average household size was 2.4 and the average family size was 3.1.

There were 8,206 housing units, of which 13.3% were vacant. The homeowner vacancy rate was 2.0% and the rental vacancy rate was 12.5%. The population density was 2,054.9 inhabitants per square mile (793.4/km^{2}).

Racial composition as of the 2020 census
Race	Number	Percent
White	15,290	79.1%
Black or African American	1,504	7.8%
American Indian and Alaska Native	106	0.5%
Asian	522	2.7%
Native Hawaiian and Other Pacific Islander	112	0.6%
Some other race	272	1.4%
Two or more races	1,531	7.9%
Hispanic or Latino (of any race)	1,066	5.5%

=== 2016–2020 American Community Survey ===
The 2016–2020 five-year American Community Survey estimates show that the median household income was $48,306 (with a margin of error of +/- $5,061) and the median family income was $73,995 (+/- $4,609). Males had a median income of $23,972 (+/- $2,489) versus $14,801 (+/- $2,763) for females. The median income for those above 16 years old was $18,108 (+/- $3,142). About 7.7% of families and 22.9% of the population were below the poverty line, including 9.2% of those under 18 and 12.8% of those 65 or over.

=== 2010 census ===
As of the 2010 census, 18,838 people, 6,803 households, and 3,400 families were living in the city. The population density was 2,128.6 inhabitants per square mile (821.9/km^{2}). The 7,450 housing units had an average density of 841.8 per square mile (325.0/km^{2}). The racial makeup of the city was 85.3% White, 7.5% African American, 0.5% Native American, 2.8% Asian, 0.2% Pacific Islander, 0.7% from other races, and 3.1% from two or more races. Hispanics or Latinos of any race were 3.1% of the population.

Of the 6,803 households, 26.5% had children under 18 living with them, 36.1% were married couples living together, 10.4% had a female householder with no husband present, 3.5% had a male householder with no wife present, and 50.0% were not families. About 31.2% of all households were made up of individuals, and 8.1% had someone living alone who was 65 or older. The average household size was 2.32 and the average family size was 2.96.

The median age in the city was 23.7 years. The age distribution was 17.6% under 18, 36.2% from 18 to 24, 21.8% from 25 to 44; 15.0% from 45 to 64, and 9.5% were 65 or older. The gender makeup of the city was 49.5% male and 50.5% female.

=== 2000 census ===
As of the 2000 census, 16,340 people, 5,951 households, and 3,035 families were living in the city. The population density was 1,938.5 inhabitants per square mile (748.5/km^{2}). There were 6,380 housing units at an average density of 756.9 per square mile (292.2/km^{2}). The racial makeup of the city was 90.09% White, 6.46% African American, 0.64% Native American, 2.79% Asian, 0.14% Pacific Islander, 0.78% from other races, and 2.28% from two or more races. Hispanic or Latino people of any race were 2.44% of the population.

Of the 5,951 households, 26.6% had children under 18 living with them, 38.5% were married couples living together, 9.9% had a female householder with no husband present, and 49.0% were not families. About 30.8% of all households were made up of individuals, and 8.5% had someone living alone who was 65 or older. The average household size was 2.29 and the average family size was 2.93.

In the city, the age distribution was 18.0% under 18, 36.5% from 18 to 24, 22.8% from 25 to 44, 12.9% from 45 to 64, and 9.7% who were 65 or older. The median age was 23 years. For every 100 females, there were 95.8 males. For every 100 females 18 and over, there were 95.4 males.

The median income for a household in the city was $29,332, and for a family was $45,845. Males had a median income of $30,354 versus $22,154 for females. The per capita income for the city was $14,714. About 13.6% of families and 24.3% of the population were below the poverty line, including 17.1% of those under age 18 and 11.4% of those age 65 or over.

== Geography ==
According to the United States Census Bureau, the city has a total area of 8.92 square miles (23.10 km^{2}), of which 0.07 sq mi (0.18 km^{2}) (or about 45 acres) is covered by water.

=== Climate ===
Climate data for Warrensburg, Missouri, 1991–2020 normals, extremes 1893–present
Month	Jan	Feb	Mar	Apr	May	Jun	Jul	Aug	Sep	Oct	Nov	Dec	Year
Record high °F (°C)	75 (24)	82 (28)	92 (33)	94 (34)	103 (39)	108 (42)	116 (47)	111 (44)	107 (42)	96 (36)	86 (30)	75 (24)	116 (47)
Mean maximum °F (°C)	63.3 (17.4)	68.8 (20.4)	77.3 (25.2)	84.0 (28.9)	87.6 (30.9)	93.6 (34.2)	98.0 (36.7)	98.0 (36.7)	92.5 (33.6)	85.6 (29.8)	73.3 (22.9)	66.2 (19.0)	99.6 (37.6)
Mean daily maximum °F (°C)	40.4 (4.7)	45.1 (7.3)	56.7 (13.7)	67.2 (19.6)	76.4 (24.7)	85.0 (29.4)	89.8 (32.1)	88.8 (31.6)	81.3 (27.4)	69.4 (20.8)	55.9 (13.3)	44.7 (7.1)	66.7 (19.3)
Daily mean °F (°C)	29.4 (−1.4)	33.6 (0.9)	44.4 (6.9)	54.8 (12.7)	64.9 (18.3)	73.9 (23.3)	78.3 (25.7)	76.8 (24.9)	68.4 (20.2)	56.4 (13.6)	44.3 (6.8)	33.9 (1.1)	54.9 (12.8)
Mean daily minimum °F (°C)	18.4 (−7.6)	22.2 (−5.4)	32.0 (0.0)	42.3 (5.7)	53.4 (11.9)	62.8 (17.1)	66.8 (19.3)	64.7 (18.2)	55.4 (13.0)	43.4 (6.3)	32.6 (0.3)	23.1 (−4.9)	43.1 (6.2)
Mean minimum °F (°C)	−1.9 (−18.8)	4.1 (−15.5)	14.6 (−9.7)	27.3 (−2.6)	38.2 (3.4)	51.4 (10.8)	58.0 (14.4)	54.8 (12.7)	41.3 (5.2)	28.0 (−2.2)	16.7 (−8.5)	6.3 (−14.3)	−4.4 (−20.2)
Record low °F (°C)	−20 (−29)	−26 (−32)	−9 (−23)	16 (−9)	23 (−5)	39 (4)	49 (9)	43 (6)	29 (−2)	18 (−8)	−3 (−19)	−17 (−27)	−26 (−32)
Average precipitation inches (mm)	1.18 (30)	1.80 (46)	3.01 (76)	4.32 (110)	5.52 (140)	5.36 (136)	4.91 (125)	4.08 (104)	4.12 (105)	3.31 (84)	2.55 (65)	1.95 (50)	42.11 (1,071)
Average snowfall inches (cm)	0.9 (2.3)	1.8 (4.6)	0.9 (2.3)	0.0 (0.0)	0.2 (0.51)	0.0 (0.0)	0.0 (0.0)	0.0 (0.0)	0.0 (0.0)	0.0 (0.0)	0.2 (0.51)	1.0 (2.5)	5.0 (13)
Average extreme snow depth inches (cm)	1.9 (4.8)	1.9 (4.8)	1.1 (2.8)	0.0 (0.0)	0.1 (0.25)	0.0 (0.0)	0.0 (0.0)	0.0 (0.0)	0.0 (0.0)	0.0 (0.0)	0.3 (0.76)	1.6 (4.1)	3.4 (8.6)
Average precipitation days (≥ 0.01 in)	3.8	4.7	7.9	10.0	10.6	10.2	7.8	7.8	7.0	7.7	6.5	4.0	88.0
Average snowy days (≥ 0.1 in)	1.4	1.3	0.6	0.0	0.0	0.0	0.0	0.0	0.0	0.0	0.2	0.3	3.8
Source: NOAA

== Education ==
Public elementary and secondary schools in Warrensburg are part of the Warrensburg R-VI School District. The district includes four elementary schools for grades preschool through fifth grade. Maple Grove and Ridgeview Elementary schools are for grades preschool through second grade while Martin Warren and Sterling elementary schools house students in grades three through five. Warrensburg Middle School serves students in grades six through eight and Warrensburg High School is for grades nine through 12. The district also operates the Reese Education Center, which houses the Gateway Alternative School and the district's special needs and gifted education programs. The Warrensburg Area Career Center specializes in vocational education for high school-aged students in Warrensburg and Johnson County.

The city is also home of the University of Central Missouri (UCM), known as Central Missouri State University until 2006. The university offers programs in 150 areas of study and serves around 12,500 students as of 2014.

Warrensburg has two public libraries, one of them a branch of the Trails Regional Library, and the other, the James C. Kirkpatrick Library, in the University of Central Missouri.

== Transportation ==
=== Major roads ===
- US 50 - Links to Lee's Summit and further to Kansas City to the west and Sedalia to the east.
- Route 13 - or Maguire Street, essentially divides the town in half though Old Highway 13 or Holden Street forms the division between east and west. This is a highway linking Warrensburg to Interstate 70 to the north, and Truman Lake to the south.

=== Air ===
- Skyhaven Airport

=== Other ===
- The Warrensburg Amtrak station provides Amtrak service between Kansas City and St. Louis via the Missouri River Runner.
- Jefferson Lines bus service to/from Kansas City and Springfield, Missouri
- "Emergency Taxi Service" – taxi service serving the Johnson County area.

== Media ==
=== Newspapers ===
- Warrensburg Star-Journal – Tuesday and Friday

=== Television ===
- KMOS-TV (PBS), PBS 6.1, CREATE CHANNEL 6.2 and PBS WORLD 6.3. The city of license is Sedalia, MO. The offices and studios are located on the campus of UCM in Warrensburg.

=== Radio ===
- KWKJ-FM, 98.5FM Operated in Windsor, but headquartered in Warrensburg with a Country format
- KOKO (AM), 1450 AM Oldies radio along with 98.5 make up WarrensburgRadio.com

== Notable people ==
- John William 'Blind' Boone (1864–1927), concert pianist, composer and principal for the Blind Boone Concert Company
- Francis M. Cockrell, Confederate military commander and politician
- Curtis Niles Cooper, mathematician and professor at the University of Central Missouri
- Errett Lobban Cord, automobile manufacturer and advocate of front-wheel-drive vehicles
- Cena Christopher Draper, children's book author and playwright
- Ada and Minna Everleigh, proprietors of the Everleigh Club brothel in Chicago
- Mary Fallin, Governor of Oklahoma and former lieutenant governor of Oklahoma
- Douglas Eads Foster, member of the Los Angeles City Council
- Robert P. Foster, president of Northwest Missouri State University 1964–1977
- Archie Scott Gobber, visual artist
- Dan Houx, member of the Missouri House of Representatives
- Dean Hughes (born 1943), children's author and academic
- Henry Warren Ogden (1842–1905), member of the United States House of Representatives
- Shawn Pelton (born 1963), musician
- Butch Reed, professional wrestler
- Aaron Rehkop, state senator
- U.S. Grant Tayes (1885–1972), African American painter, educator, musician, and newspaper columnist
- Sidney Toler (April 28, 1874 – February 12, 1947), actor and writer
- Kimberly Wyatt, former member of female pop group The Pussycat Dolls
- Brendan Vintedge, singer songwriter

== See also ==
- List of cities in Missouri
