= Archie Scott Gobber =

- Born: 1965 (age 60–61); Warrensburg, Missouri, US
- Education: 1988, BFA, Kansas City Art Institute, Kansas City, Missouri
- Known for: Painting, sculpture
- Awards: 2009, Art through Architecture (AtA) "Art Achievement" Project Commission; 1998, Charlotte Street Fellow Award

Archie Scott Gobber (born 1965, in Warrensburg, Missouri) is an artist currently living and working in Kansas City, Missouri, who is known for eye-catching works that employ clever wordplay as a vehicle for social and political commentary. Gobber is represented by HAW CONTEMPORARY in Kansas City, MO. His work consists of works on paper, paintings, and sculptural installations.

Scott has one child and a wife.

== Education ==
Gobber received a Bachelor of Fine Arts from the Kansas City Art Institute in 1988.

== Exhibitions ==
- Amateur Content at Haw Contemporary/Crossroads, 2018
- Artists Interrogate: Politics and War at the Milwaukee Art Museum
- American Dream: In Question at the Belger Arts Center
- WORD at the Nerman Museum of Contemporary Art, Overland Park, Kansas
- Laugh It Off at Walter Maciel Gallery in Los Angeles, California.

In 2008 Archie Scott Gobber was featured in a group show at Marty Walker Gallery in Dallas, Tx titled "There's something I've been meaning to tell you...". Also at Marty Walker Gallery, Archie Scott Gobber held two solo art exhibitions in 2008, titled "Group Hug" and "In Loving Memory of You".

== Collections ==
Museums that include works by Gobber in their collections include the Kemper Museum of Contemporary Art, Kansas City, Missouri, the Nerman Museum of Contemporary Art in Overland Park, Kansas, The Daum Museum of Contemporary Art, Sedalia, MO, and the Spencer Museum of Art, Lawrence, Kansas.
