= St. Clair High School (Missouri) =

Location
- 1015 High School Drive; St. Clair, Franklin County, Missouri 63077; United States
- Coordinates: 38.3361°N 90.9792°W

Information
- School type: Public, Secondary
- Founded: 1907
- Status: Open
- School district: St. Clair R-XIII School District
- NCES District ID: 2929100
- Superintendent: Melissa Husereau
- NCES School ID: 292910001864
- Principal: Michael Cornwell
- Teaching staff: 47.89 (on an FTE basis)
- Grades: 9-12
- Enrollment: 648 (2023–24)
- Student to teacher ratio: 13.53
- Colors: Red and Gray
- Athletics conference: Four Rivers
- Sports: Football, Baseball, Basketball, Soccer, Golf, Cross Country, Track
- Mascot: Bulldog
- Website: highschool.stcmo.org

St. Clair High School is a high school in St. Clair, Missouri, United States, and is part of the St. Clair R-XIII School District in Franklin County, Missouri. This school is a public high school and services grades 9–12. Saint Clair's mascot is "Spike" the bulldog.

== Notable incidents ==
=== Suicides ===
Three students, a freshman, a sophomore and a junior committed suicide during a period of seven weeks in 2012. Bullying was believed by some parents to be the motivation.

=== 2023 OnlyFans scandal ===
In 2023, St. Clair High School made national news after two teachers were forced to resign after they were discovered producing and appearing in pornographic videos on OnlyFans. One of the teachers, whose annual salary was $42,000 before she resigned, had made nearly $1 million producing content on OnlyFans.
