= St. Michael the Archangel Catholic High School =

High school in Lee's Summit, Missouri, U.S.

Location
- 2901 NW Lee's Summit Road; Lee's Summit, Missouri 64064; United States; 38.9663°N 94.3833°W

Information
- Type: Private high school
- Motto: Know Truth, Love God, Serve Others
- Religious affiliation: Roman Catholic
- Established: 2017; 9 years ago
- Oversight: Diocese of Kansas City–Saint Joseph
- NCES School ID: 00753724
- Principal: Mary Kroening
- Teaching staff: 27.5 (on an FTE basis)
- Grades: 9–12
- Gender: Co-educational
- Enrollment: 299 (2017–18)
- Student to teacher ratio: 10.9
- Colors: Blue, green, and silver
- Nickname: Guardians
- Website: smacatholic.org

St. Michael the Archangel Catholic High School (SMA) is a private, Catholic, co-educational high school in Lee's Summit, Missouri, United States. It was established in 2017 and is part of the Diocese of Kansas City–St. Joseph.

It is the first new high school built by the Diocese in over 50 years and replaced both St. Mary's and Archbishop O'Hara High Schools. It enrolls around 300 students.
