= Notre Dame High School (Cape Girardeau, Missouri) =

Notre Dame Regional High School
- Notre Dame

Location
- 265 Notre Dame Drive; Cape Girardeau, (Cape Girardeau County), Missouri 63701; United States; 37°18′21″N 89°36′34″W

Information
- Type: Private, Coeducational
- Motto: Virtus et scientia (Virtue and knowledge)
- Religious affiliation: Roman Catholic
- Patron saint: Mary
- Established: 1925
- Founder: School Sisters of Notre Dame
- Superintendent: Deacon Rob Huff
- President: Tim Garner
- Principal: Paul Unterreiner
- Chaplain: Rev. Jesse Hiett Rev. Colby Elbert
- Grades: 9–12
- Student to teacher ratio: 13:1
- Colors: Royal Blue and White
- Slogan: Give us your child and we shall return you an apostle.
- Sports: List: Boys Volleyball; Girls Volleyball; Softball; Baseball; Boys Soccer; Girls Soccer; Boys Tennis; Girls Tennis; Boys Swimming; Girls Swimming; Cross Country; Boys Golf; Girls Golf; Boys Basketball; Girls Basketball; Cheerleading; Wrestling; Dance; Scholar Bowl; Track and Field
- Mascot: Bulldog
- Team name: Bulldogs
- Accreditation: Missouri Nonpublic School Accrediting Association
- Newspaper: The Hi-Lites
- Yearbook: The Silhouette
- Development Director: Nathan Martin
- Athletic Director: Jeff Graviett
- Website: www.notredamehighschool.org

Notre Dame Regional High School is a private Roman Catholic high school located in Cape Girardeau, Missouri. The school enrolls students in grades 9–12, and belongs to the Diocese of Springfield-Cape Girardeau.

Notre Dame serves students from several communities in southeast Missouri and southern Illinois. Notre Dame has also served as host to several international students, including students from Japan, China, Indonesia, South Korea, Thailand, Mexico, Spain, Brazil, and the Philippines.

== History ==
Boys & Girls Academies

Before the founding of St. Mary High School, the Catholic youth of this area studied at the historic college of St. Vincent for boys and the Loretto Academy for girls. St. Vincent's College was conducted by the Vincentian Fathers and the Loretto Academy was conducted by the Sisters of Loretto.

St. Mary High School

The building which housed St. Mary High School was the first permanent location of St. Francis Hospital until 1914. In the spring of 1925, Very Reverend Eberhardt Pruente, V.F. purchased this building at Sprigg and William Streets for $21,000 and renovated it for use as St. Mary High School. On September 1, 1925, the school opened enrolling 7th and 8th grades, and first year high school students. Sister Mary Francis was the first teacher.

In 1928 the school was accredited by the State of Missouri. The first class graduated June 9, 1929, with eight students. In 1931, the school nearly closed due to the Depression, but Mother Jolendis gave the Sisters permission to teach in the school "gratis". The school progressed through the 1930s and 1940s in spite of times of war.

Cape Girardeau Catholic High School to Notre Dame High School

This building served as St. Mary High School for twenty-nine years before its capacity could not accommodate the enlarging student body. In 1948, Rev. Theon Schoen, then pastor of St. Mary, began plans for a new and larger high school. Land was purchased between Caruthers and Clark Avenue from the Wulfers family for a new Catholic high school. A groundbreaking ceremony was held on June 21, 1953, for a new building that would accommodate between 350 and 400 students. The new Cape Girardeau Catholic High School opened on September 13, 1954, with an enrollment of 211 students. The school changed its name to Notre Dame High School in 1960. In 1962 Notre Dame received accreditation from the North Central Association of Secondary Schools and Colleges.

Notre Dame Established as a Regional High School

In 1995 it was determined that the building was no longer serving the needs of the school community, and a capital campaign began to construct a new high school off Route K. The new campus opened in August 1998 on land donated by the James and Wanda Drury Family Trust. The school was built to accommodate 600 students. The school was renamed Notre Dame Regional High School in conjunction with the school's broad enrollment. Today Notre Dame Regional High School is the largest private high school between St. Louis and Memphis. It has grown to an enrollment of over 500 students.

== Academics ==
Notre Dame is a NCEA designated STREAM school. Graduation requirements for students include four years of coursework in theology and the communication arts. Additional requirements include three years of coursework in mathematics, social studies, and science. Notre Dame partners with Southeast Missouri State University to offer 22 courses which may be taken for college credit, equivalent to 73 college credit hours.

== Athletics ==
Notre Dame Regional High School fields teams in 22 varsity sports. Notre Dame competes in athletic competitions within the Missouri State High School Athletics Association (MSHSAA) and has won 31 state championships. In boys and girls basketball, Notre Dame competes in the SEMO conference alongside Cape Central High School, Jackson High School, and Sikeston High School. Notre Dame is the only private school in the SEMO Conference.
