= Helias Catholic High School =

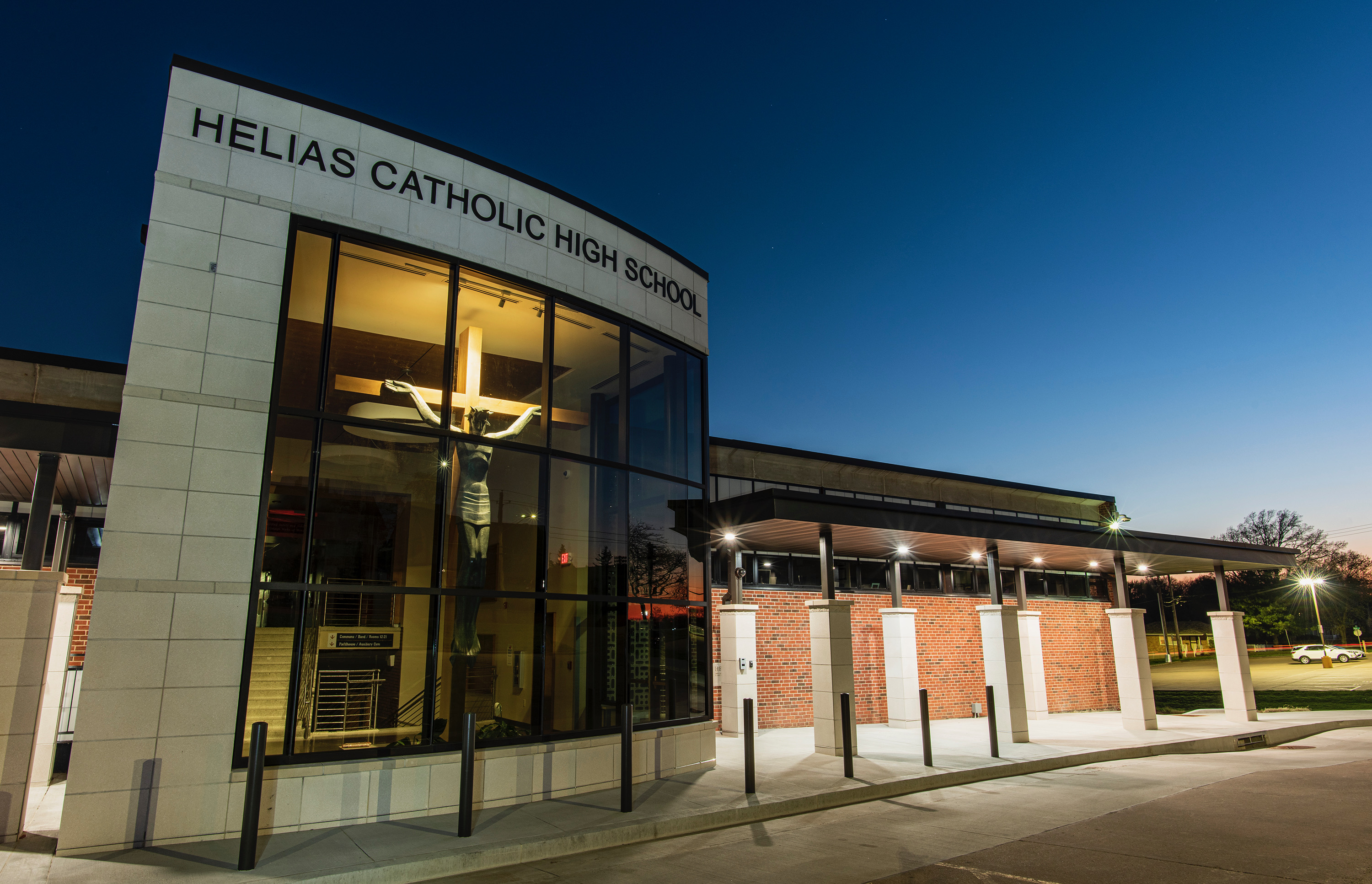

Location
- 1305 Swifts Highway; Jefferson City, Missouri 65109; United States
- Coordinates: 38.568230°N 92.192100°W

Information
- Type: Parochial, Coeducational
- Religious affiliation: Roman Catholic
- Established: 1956
- Status: Open
- Oversight: Diocese of Jefferson City
- President: Ron Vossen (2023)
- Principal: Spencer Allen (2021)
- Teaching staff: 58
- Grades: 9–12
- Student to teacher ratio: 16:1
- Colors: Navy Blue and Old Gold
- Mascot: Crusader
- Accreditation: National Federation of Nonpublic School State Accrediting Associations
- Affiliation: Christian Brothers and The School Sisters of Notre Dame
- Website: Official website

Helias Catholic High School is a diocesan, Roman Catholic high school in Jefferson City, Missouri, United States.

== History ==
Helias High School opened for the 1956-57 school year. The school became necessary when St. Peter High School, which previously served the community, reached capacity. Named after the Jesuit missionary Ferdinand Helias, the institution was staffed by the De La Salle Christian Brothers, the School Sisters of Notre Dame, diocesan priests and lay members of the Catholic Church. Until 1969, Helias was co-institutional, meaning that the boys and girls had separate classes. James L. Rackers was the first layman to direct a Catholic school in Missouri after being named principal in 1971. In 2010, Helias High School changed its name to Helias Catholic.

== Staff misconduct ==
In November 2011, Fr. Brendan Doyle, then a priest at Helias Catholic High School, was placed on leave from his duties by church diocese after inappropriate pornographic images were found on his laptop by a computer repair technician. Doyle was permanently suspended from public ministry and his role at the high school in March 2012 after an investigation by the US Attorney's Office and a review board from the Diocese of Jefferson City.

== Notable alumni ==
- John Daly, PGA Tour player - twice major champion
- Hale Hentges, former NFL player for the Washington Redskins
- Sam LeCure, former MLB player (Cincinnati Reds)
- Beth Phillips, Judge of the United States District Court for the Western District of Missouri
- Jon Staggers, former NFL player
- Jamaal Tatum, former Southern Illinois player, class of '03
- Carl Vogel, former Missouri State Senator
