= Donna Pfautsch =

American politician

Member of the Missouri House of Representatives from the 33rd district
- Incumbent
- Assumed office 2013

Personal details
- Born: August 19, 1951 (age 74) Cass County, Missouri
- Party: Republican
- Spouse: Larry
- Children: two
- Profession: teacher, farmer

Donna Pfautsch (born August 19, 1951) is an American politician. She is a member of the Missouri House of Representatives, having served since 2013. She is a member of the Republican Party.
