= Archbishop O'Hara High School =

Closed high school in Kansas City, Missouri, U.S.

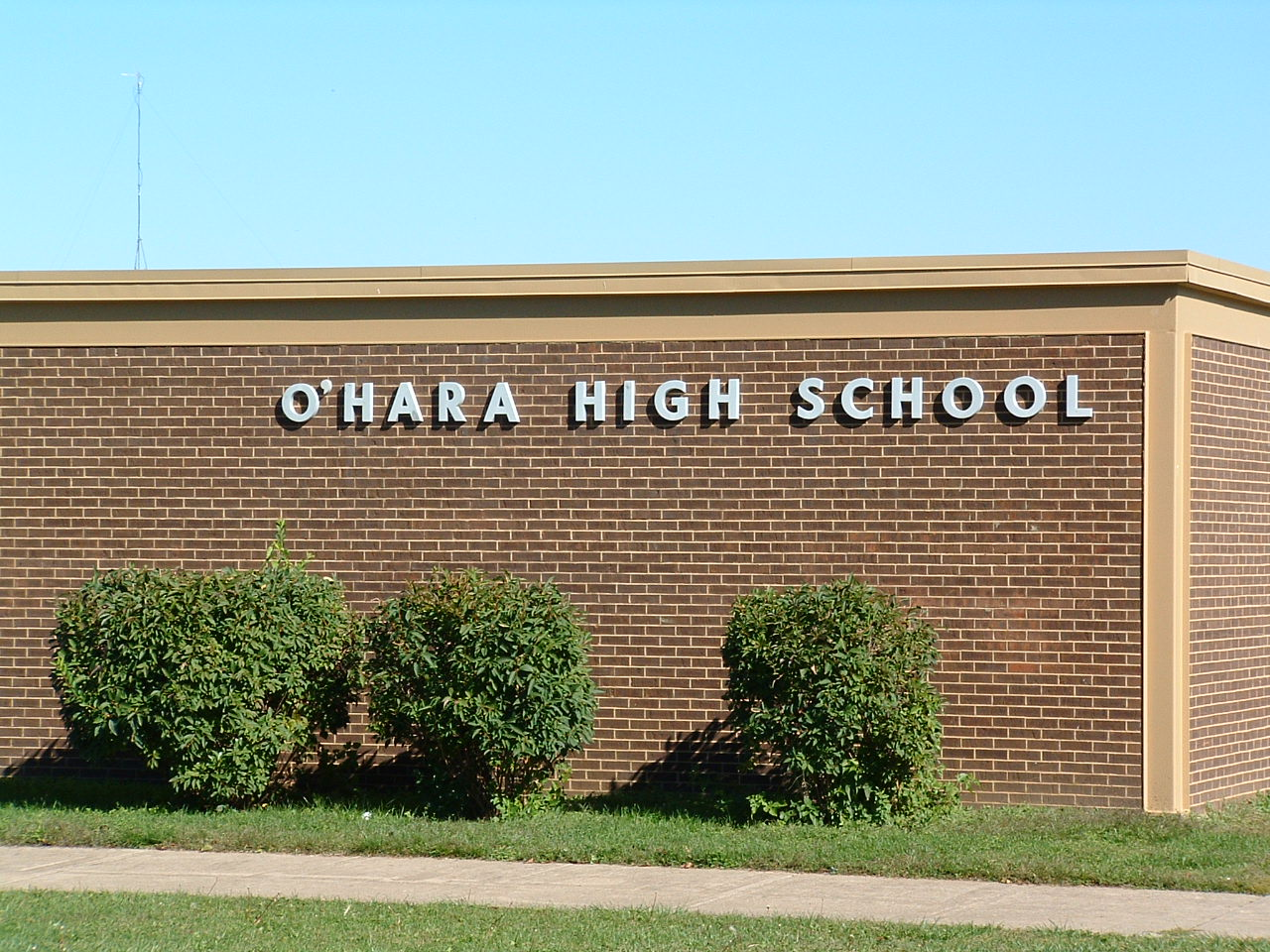

Location
- Kansas City, Missouri 64138; United States; 38°57′40″N 94°29′35″W

Information
- Type: Private college-preparatory school
- Religious affiliation: Roman Catholic
- Established: 1965
- Closed: 2017
- Oversight: Diocese of Kansas City–Saint Joseph
- Principal: Jane Schaffer
- Faculty: 39
- Grades: 9–12
- Average class size: 20
- Student to teacher ratio: 14:1
- Colors: Green and gold
- Athletics conference: West Central
- Nickname: Celtics
- Accreditation: NCA
- Newspaper: The Celtic Sword
- Tuition: $7,900+
- Website: oharahs.org

Archbishop O'Hara High School was a Catholic high school in Kansas City, Missouri. It was located in the Diocese of Kansas City–St. Joseph. The school was also associated with the De La Salle Christian Brothers, and was one of the ministries of the Midwest District of the Brothers.

== Background ==
Archbishop O'Hara High School was established in 1965. It was named after Archbishop Edwin Vincent O'Hara, former Bishop of the diocese of Kansas City-St. Joseph.

O'Hara was a college-preparatory school offering AP courses and university credit through Rockhurst University and the University of Missouri–Kansas City. 100% of its students attended post secondary education with approximately 75% enrolling in four year colleges and universities. O'Hara had great success in sports since its beginnings with state championships in a variety of sports. Sports offered included football, basketball, swimming, soccer, tennis, golf, wrestling, track, cross country.

== History ==
November 2013 saw a Catholic brother at Kansas City's O'Hara High School fired after police confirmed an investigation of suspicious photographs on a school computer that he used. Investigators said that a student had borrowed the brother's computer to print a document. When the student was finished, they closed the application and a suspicious file popped up. The student reported what they saw to the principal and the brother was placed on administrative leave.

The school was closed following the 2016–17 school year. A new high school, St. Michael the Archangel High School, opened in Lee's Summit in 2017, and some of the faculty moved to the new school. The building was listed on the National Register of Historic Places in 2021.
