= Harrisonville High School =

Location
- 1504 E. Elm; Harrisonville, Missouri 64701; United States; 38.658789°N 94.335874°W

Information
- Type: Public secondary school
- School district: Harrisonville R-IX School District
- Principal: Mark Rorvig
- Teaching staff: 43.89 (on an FTE basis)
- Grades: 9-12
- Enrollment: 734 (2024-2025)
- Student to teacher ratio: 16.72
- Colors: Blue and white
- Athletics conference: Missouri River Valley Conference
- Nickname: Wildcats
- Website: www.harrisonvilleschools.org/school/harrisonville-high-school-grades-9-12

Harrisonville High School is a public high school located in Harrisonville, Missouri, United States. It serves students in grades 9 through 12 and is the only high school in the Harrisonville R-IX School District.

The school district includes Harrisonville.

== History ==
Harrisonville High graduated its first class in 1888.

== Academics ==
HHS offers Advanced Placement classes. About a quarter of students take AP courses.

== Athletics ==
Harrisonville athletic teams are nicknamed the Wildcats and compete in the Missouri River Valley Conference West.

State Championships
Sport	Year(s)
Football	2003, 2005, 2006, 2007, 2016
Softball	2006
Wrestling (girls)	2020, 2026

Sports at Harrisonville High School include: (Fall) girls’ golf, girls’ tennis, softball, boys’ soccer, cross country, cheer, and dance (Winter) girls’ basketball, boys’ basketball, girls’ wrestling, boys’ wrestling, cheer, and dance (Spring) boys’ golf, boys’ tennis, baseball, girls’ soccer, and track

== Performing arts ==
Harrisonville has two competitive show choirs, "Music Makers" and "Forefront". The program also hosts an annual competition.

The school also has a competitive dance team, the "Silver Sensations".

== Notable alumni ==
- Brutus Hamilton, pentathlete and decathlete
