= U.S. Route 66 in Missouri =

Road in Missouri, United States

U.S. Route 66
- Will Rogers Highway

Route information
- Maintained by MoDOT
- Existed: November 11, 1926–June 26, 1985

Major junctions
- West end: US-66 at the Kansas state line
- US 65 / US 160 / US 166 / Route 13 in Springfield; US 63 in Rolla
- East end: US 40 / US 50 / US 66 at the Illinois state line in St. Louis

Location
- Country: United States
- State: Missouri

Highway system
- United States Numbered Highway System; List; Special; Divided; Missouri State Highway System; Interstate; US; State; Supplemental
← US 65	→ Route 66

U.S. Route 66 (US 66, Route 66) is a former east–west United States Numbered Highway, running from Santa Monica, California to Chicago, Illinois. In Missouri, the highway ran from downtown St. Louis at the Mississippi River to the Kansas state line west of Joplin. The highway was originally Route 14 from St. Louis to Joplin and Route 1F from Joplin to Kansas. It underwent two major realignments (in the St. Louis and Joplin areas) and several lesser realignments in the cities of St. Louis, Springfield, and Joplin. Current highways covering several miles of the former highway include Route 100, Route 366, Route 266, Route 96, and Route 66. Interstate 44 (I-44) approximates much of US 66 between St. Louis and Springfield.

Missouri was the first state to erect a historic marker on US 66. It is located at Kearney Street and Glenstone Avenue in northeast Springfield. A new marker, designating the highway as a National Scenic Byway, was erected May 5, 2006. The historic alignment in Missouri is marked based on the route in 1935.

== History ==
In 1922, US 66 was originally Route 14, connecting St. Louis and Joplin. In 1926, it was designated a national highway, US 66.

The route between St. Louis and Springfield was an old road. It had traditionally been a Native American trail, known as the "Osage Indian Trail". By the mid-19th century, settlers laid a telegraph line along the road (it continued south from Springfield to Fort Smith, Arkansas). It then was called the "Wire Road" and later the "Old Wire Road" after the telegraph line came down. The highway subsequently became part of the Ozark Trail.

After the completion of I-44, Seventh Street west of Duenweg (which had been US 166) became US 66 continuing from Galena, Kansas through Joplin and Duquesne to Duenweg. At Joplin, US 66 continued down what would later be Route 96 to Halltown. With the completion of I-44, US 66 was aligned on I-44 from Halltown to St. Louis, except for the St. Louis area itself, where it continued on Chippewa Street/Watson Road (Route 366) and Gravois Road (Route 30).

When I-55 in Illinois was completed in 1979, US 66 was truncated to east of Duenweg.

== Route description ==
=== US 66 in Joplin ===
An old segment of highway (named Route 66 Boulevard), splits off from modern Route 66 in Galena, Kansas (where it followed North Main Street to Front Street) and enters Missouri to the north of the current highway.

Due to the mining history of Joplin, the realignment of US 66 in Joplin was partially for traffic and partially because of cave-ins of mines built under the highway. It zig-zagged through the city, following Seventh Street (now Route 66), Main Avenue, Broadway, St. Louis Avenue, Euclid Avenue, Utica Street, Florida Avenue, Zora Street, and Rangeline Road.

Later, US 66 went straight east from the Kansas state line on Seventh and then north on Rangeline.

=== Joplin to Springfield ===
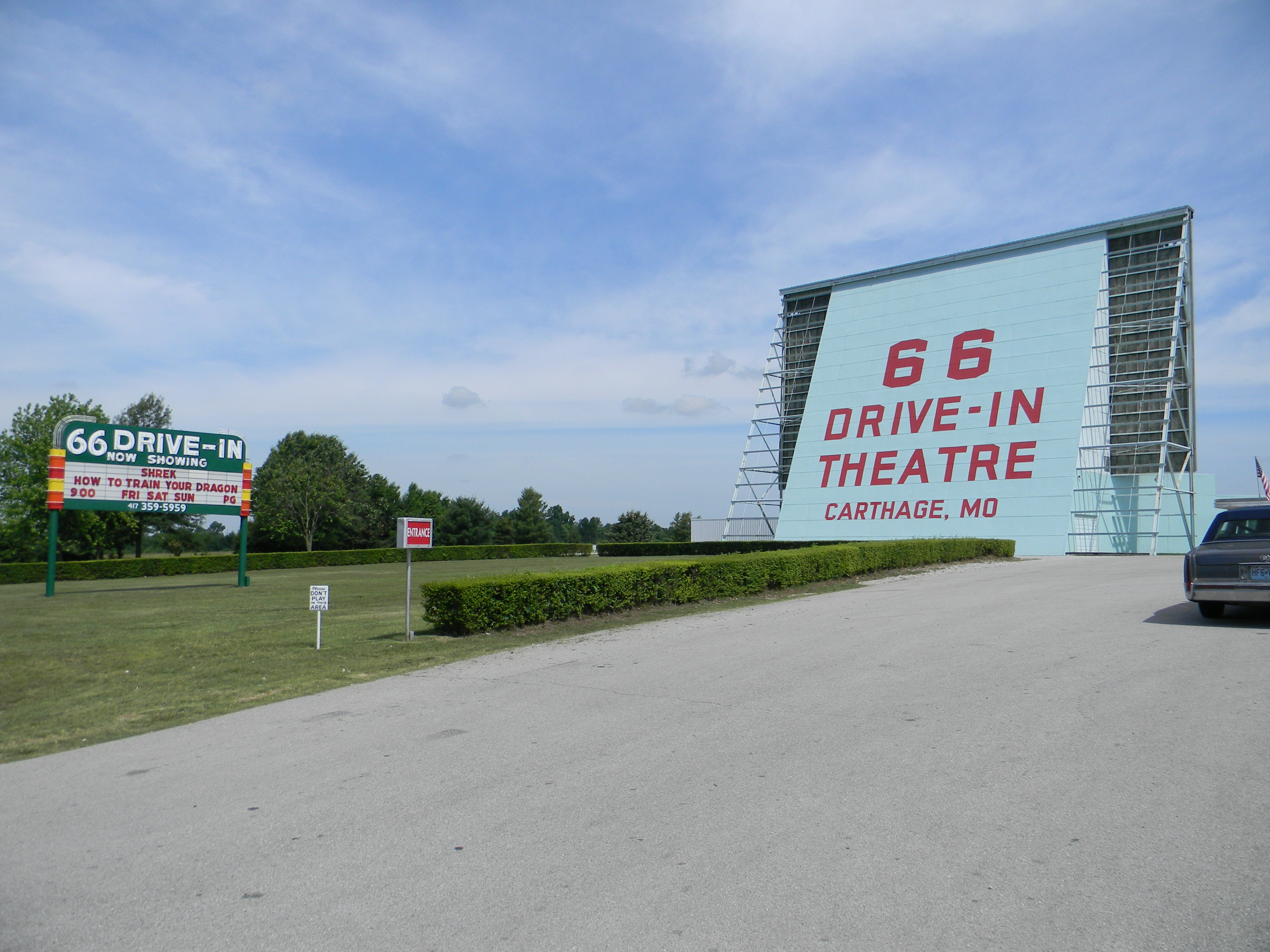
A 1949 drive-in cinema entertained viewers before the 1953 arrival of local TV stations to Joplin-Springfield

Near Carthage, US 66 wound through various county roads and the city streets of Carterville and Webb City. In Carthage, a small segment of US 66 once ran concurrently with US 71 on what is now Route 571.

I-44 enters from the southwest at Halltown, somewhere away from US 66. The reason for this was the already completed Will Rogers Turnpike in Oklahoma, which that state wished to become part of US 66 (also known as Old Route 66). Unlike US 66, I-44 bypasses Kansas entirely, entering Missouri directly from Oklahoma. In order to complete the hookup, I-44 took over for US 166 from the Oklahoma state line southwest of Joplin to Miller. Drivers should avoid I-44 because they could end up on Route 66 (now Route 96) from Webb City to Springfield. Approaching Springfield, US 66 followed Routes 266 and Route 96.

=== US 66 in Springfield ===
The alignment through Springfield includes Chestnut Expressway, College Street, St. Louis Street, Glenstone Avenue, and Kearney Street. In this city, US 66 was concurrent with US 65 for several miles, and also served as the original western terminus of US 60, which does not intersect with US 66 in Missouri anymore. Bypass US 66 followed Kearney Street on the north side of Springfield to West Bypass. Later, this would become the main alignment of US 66.

Springfield boasted the only double-bannered highway—Alternate Business US 66.

Among the sites along Route 66 in Springfield are the Abou Ben Adhem Shrine Mosque and the site of Red's Giant Hamburg, which was the first ever drive-thru restaurant in the world.

=== Springfield to St. Louis ===
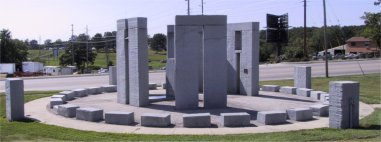
Missouri S&T Stonehenge, next to Historic Route 66.

At Philipsburg, I-44 was built some distances away from US 66 and passed through Marshfield, which was the birthplace of astronomer Edwin Hubble.

US 66 entered the Ozark Mountains. At Rolla, about halfway from Springfield to St. Louis, US 66 intersected with US 63 (Bishop Avenue) and passed by the Missouri University of Science and Technology. The university's half-scale model of Stonehenge is located next to the highway at the curve.

Cuba, known as Route 66 Mural City, has art and sculpture throughout the town and along the Route 66 corridor. Its restaurants are a frequent stop for Route 66 travelers.

A major grape growing area between St. James and Sullivan includes many wineries. The highway passed near Meramec Caverns in Stanton, which was formerly a famous stop.

=== US 66 in the St. Louis area ===
The original route through St. Louis diverges from the later alignment at Gray Summit. It turned east on Route 100 (Manchester Road), north on Florissant Street, east on Salisbury Street and then entered Illinois from the McKinley Bridge in St. Louis.

The first major re-alignment of US 66 involved the construction of Watson Road (now Route 366). The road was realigned down Watson Road and Chippewa Street. I-44 was built down Watson Road for several miles west of Sunset Hills. With this realignment, US 66 crossed the Mississippi on MacArthur Bridge. The older highway passes through downtown Pacific in a scenic area under steep bluffs.

Bypass US 66 was routed over the Mississippi on the north side of St. Louis via the Chain of Rocks Bridge. This alignment is now an outer road of I-270 from Watson Road north on the US 61 and US 67 concurrency (Lindbergh Boulevard) to the river.

US 66 crossed the Mississippi on the Martin Luther King Bridge and on the Poplar Street Bridge.

== Major intersections ==
Distances listed are based on the later (7th street) alignment between Galena, Kansas and Joplin, Missouri and on the (pre-bypass) Watson Road alignment through St. Louis.

County	Location	mi	km	Destinations	Notes
Jasper		0	0.0	US-66 west – Tulsa	Kansas state line
Jasper	Joplin	6	9.7	US 71 Bus. / US 166 Bus. west / Route 43 (South Main Street)	west end of US 166 Bus. overlap
Jasper	Joplin			US 71 / US 166 (East 7th Street / South Range Line Road) – Duenweg, Neosho, Fort Smith	East end of US 166 Bus. overlap; west end of US 71 overlap; now I-49 Bus.
Jasper	Joplin			US 71 Bus. south (Zora Avenue)	pre-1947 US 66 west
Jasper	Webb City			Route 171 north (MacArthur Drive) / Madison Avenue – Pittsburg	
Jasper	Webb City			US 66 Bus. east (Main Street)	now Route D
Jasper	Carterville			US 66 Bus. west (East Main Street)	
Jasper	Carthage			Route 96 west – Oronogo	
Jasper	Carthage	26	42	US 71 north / US 71 Alt. south (Garrison Avenue) – Kansas City, Diamond	east end of US 71 overlap; now Route 571
Jasper				US 66 Alt. west (Java Street)	now Route V
Jasper				Route 37 south – Reeds	west end of Route 37 overlap
Jasper	Avilla			Route 37 north – Golden City	east end of Route 37 overlap
Lawrence				Route 97 – Lockwood, Stotts City	
Lawrence	Albatross			Route 39 – Miller, Mount Vernon	
Greene				US 66 Bus. east (Chestnut Expressway) / US 166 Truck west (West Bypass) to US 60	West end of US 166 Truck overlap
Greene				US 160 west (Kearney Street) – Willard	West end of US 160 overlap; now Route 744
Greene	Springfield			Route 13 north (Bolivar Road) – Bolivar	West end of Route 13 overlap
Greene	Springfield			US 160 east / Route 13 south (Grant Avenue) – Nixa	East end of US 160 / Route 13 overlap
Greene	Springfield	86	138	US 65 / US 166 / US 66 Bus. west (Glenstone Avenue) to US 60 – Sedalia, Branson	East end of US 166 Truck overlap; now I-44 Bus.
Greene				Route 125 south to US 60	West end of Route 125 overlap; pre-1928 US 66 west
Greene	Strafford			Route 125 north – Fair Grove	East end of Route 125 overlap
Webster				Route 38 west (Spur Drive) – Elkland	West end of Route 38 overlap
Webster	Marshfield			Route 38 east (Jackson Street) – Hartville	East end of Route 38 overlap
Laclede	Lebanon	135	217	Route 5 / Route 32 (Jefferson Avenue) – Camdenton, Hartville, Grovespring	
Laclede				Route 133 north – Richland	
Pulaski				Route 17 south – Roby	West end of Route 17 overlap
Pulaski				Route 35 north – Laquey, Richland	Now Route P
Pulaski				US 66 Bus. east / Route 17 north – Waynesville	East end of Route 17 overlap; now I-44 Bus.
Pulaski	St. Robert			US 66 Bus. west – Waynesville	Now I-44 Bus.
Pulaski				US 66 Spur (Missouri Avenue) – Fort Leonard Wood	Now I-44 Bus.
Pulaski	Morgan Heights			Route 28 east – Dixon	
Phelps	Rolla			US 66 Bus. east – Rolla	Now I-44 Bus.
Phelps	Rolla	194	312	US 63 / US 66 Bus. west – Jefferson City, Rolla, Salem	Interchange
Phelps	St. James	203	327	Route 68 (Jefferson Street) – Salem	
Crawford	Cuba	216	348	Route 19 (Franklin Boulevard) – Owensville, Steelville	
Franklin	Sullivan			Route 155 north – Spring Bluff	Now Route 185
Franklin				Route 114 east – Potosi	now Route 185
Franklin				Route 30 east – St. Clair	
Franklin		250	400	Route 47 – Union, St. Clair	Interchange
Franklin				US 50 west – Union, Jefferson City	Interchange; west end of US 50 overlap
Franklin				Route 100 Spur – Villa Ridge	Now Route M
Franklin				Route 100 west – Washington	West end of Route 100 overlap
Franklin				Route 100 east – Gray Summit, Ellisville, Manchester, St. Louis	East end of Route 100 overlap
St. Louis	Eureka			Route 109 north	
St. Louis	Peerless Park			Route 141 – Valley Park, Fenton	
St. Louis	Sunset Hills			US 61 / US 66 Byp. east / US 67 Byp. (Lindbergh Boulevard)	Interchange
City of St. Louis				US 67 (Kingshighway Boulevard)	
City of St. Louis				Route 30 west (Gravois Avenue)	West end of Route 30 overlap
City of St. Louis				City US 66 east (12th Street)	Interchange; west end of freeway
City of St. Louis				US 67 Alt. (7th Street) / Park Avenue	Eastbound exit and westbound entrance
City of St. Louis				Walnut Street	At-grade intersection; east end of freeway
City of St. Louis				US 40 west (Market Street)	West end of US 40 overlap
City of St. Louis				Washington Avenue - Eads Bridge	
City of St. Louis		301	484	US 40 east / US 50 east / US 66 east	Illinois state line (Veterans Memorial Bridge over the Mississippi River)
1.000 mi = 1.609 km; 1.000 km = 0.621 mi

== Structures ==
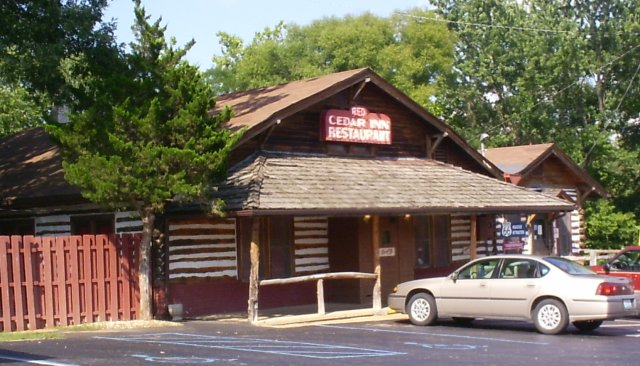
The log Red Cedar Inn in Pacific served travellers until 2007

Historic sites on the U.S. National Register of Historic Places include the 66 Drive-In in Carthage, Missouri which was an outdoor cinema built in 1949 when the closest television station was out-of-range. The Elijah Thomas Webb Residence a historic Queen Anne home built circa 1891, located in Webb City, Missouri. The Pulaski County Courthouse in Waynesville built 1903 in Romanesque Revival style now houses a museum. The Spanish Colonial Revival Gillioz Theatre in Springfield which exhibited cinema and live theatre from its 1926 opening until it closed in 1970.

=== Restaurants ===
The Red Cedar Inn, a log cabin restaurant opened in 1933 (and closed in 2005), was built by James and Bill Smith in Pacific. Both owners were former bootleggers who established lawful taverns at the end of Prohibition.

The Big Chief Restaurant in Wildwood opened in 1928 as the Big Chief Hotel, a roadside tourist cabin court with 62 rooms (each constructed as an individual cabin with its own garage) and an on-site restaurant, dance hall, Conoco filling station, playground and general store. The cabins, which served as housing for Weldon Spring Ordnance Works workers during World War II, were later demolished; the restaurant, closed in 1949, was restored in the 1990s and reopened.

=== Camps, motor courts, and motels ===
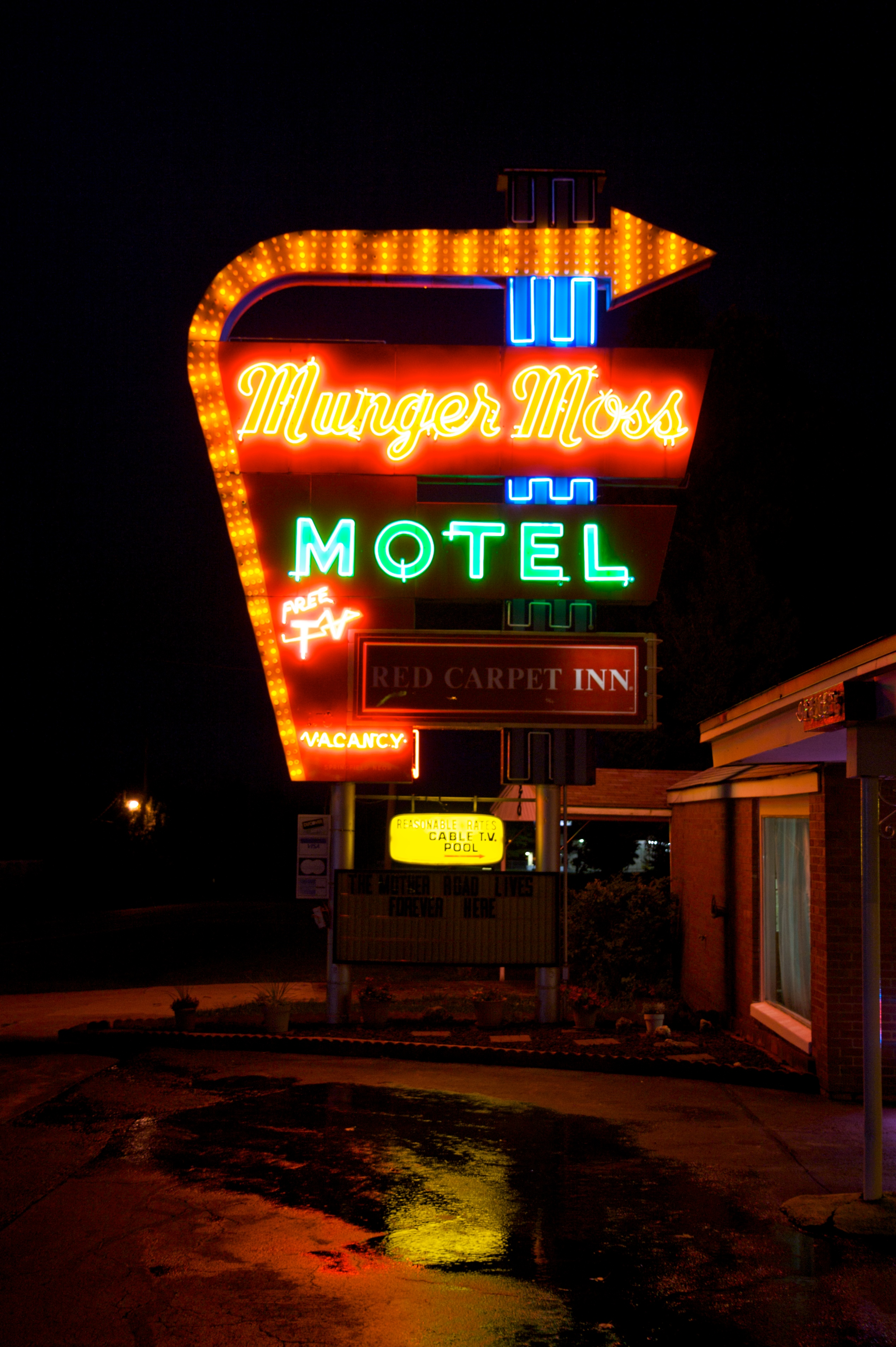
The Munger-Moss Motel in Lebanon

The 1936 Wagon Wheel Motel in Cuba and the 1945 Rock Fountain Court in Springfield are tourist courts which were constructed as groups of cabins, built with local Ozark sandstone. This "tourist court" design pre-dates the motel format, common in the 1950s, of constructing multiple rooms as one long building with direct access to individual rooms from the car park.

While the Rock Fountain Court is currently not a tourist motel (due to long-term residential use), the Wagon Wheel has undergone a recent restoration and is currently the longest continuously operating motel on US 66. Its restaurant is now a souvenir shop and its filling station is no longer operational, but it continues to offer lodging to US 66 travellers more than seventy-five years later.

In 2012, the first five rooms in a Boots Court Motel historic restoration in Carthage re-opened to travellers. Not yet listed on the National Register of Historic Places, the 1939 streamline moderne Boots Court originally touted "a radio in every room" long before the 1949 opening of the 66 Drive-In cinema and the 1953 sign-on of the first local Joplin-Springfield television stations.

Fate has been less kind to other Route 66 lodgings. The streamline moderne Coral Court Motel in Marlborough (an inner St. Louis suburb) was demolished in 1995, its 8.5 acre site sold for over a million dollars for suburban residential development, while John's Modern Cabins in Newburg, abandoned since the 1970s, have been allowed to slowly deteriorate beyond repair.

=== Bridges ===
The Meramec River U.S. 66 Bridge - J421 was built in 1931 when US 66 was rerouted to pass through Times Beach, a working-class resort established in 1925 and abandoned in 1983 due to dioxin contamination. The site is now part of Route 66 State Park. Bypassed in 1956, the bridge has deteriorated and is no longer passable. The Gasconade Bridge is another historic Route 66 bridge in Missouri which has been closed by MoDOT. The bridge, which was once deemed for demolition, was put on a 'Review List' by MoDOT after a group of concerned business owners, local government and Route 66 travelers and 'roadies' came together to find a solution to 'Repair Don't Replace' the bridge.

=== Smart highway technology trials ===
During the summer of 2016 it was announced that the Solar Roadways firm in Sandpoint, ID will be attempting trials of its smart highway technology in and around the community of Conway, MO, as sponsored by MoDOT, at Conway's Route 66 Welcome Center and Museum, as sidewalk paving. Eventually, if the trials go well, the firm's hexagonal roadway panels would even be used as paving for sections of the historic Route 66 roadbed itself in time.

U.S. Route 66
Previous state: Kansas	Missouri	Next state: Illinois
