= Missouri Route 86 =

State highway in Missouri, U.S.

Route 86
- MO 86 highlighted in red

Route information
- Maintained by MoDOT
- Length: 110.324 mi (177.549 km)
- Existed: 1922–present

Major junctions
- West end: I-44 / I-44 BL / Route 43 in Joplin
- I-49 / I-49 BL / US 71 in Neosho; US 60 / Route 59 near Neosho
- East end: US 65 north of Ridgedale

Location
- Country: United States
- State: Missouri

Highway system
- Missouri State Highway System; Interstate; US; State; Supplemental
| ← Route 85 | → Route 87 |

Route 86 is a highway in southwest Missouri. The eastern terminus is at U.S. Route 65 just north of Ridgedale. From there, the road crosses the Long Creek arm of Table Rock Lake and continues to Blue Eye west between the Arkansas state line on the south and Table Rock Lake on the north. This section is also in the Mark Twain National Forest, and is recommended as a scenic drive by the Missouri Department of Transportation. From Eagle Rock the road turns north to join with Route 76 at Bates Corner with which it is runs concurrent through Cassville to just east of Rocky Comfort. The road continues north and west towards Neosho, then goes further west before turning north towards Joplin where the road ends at the interchange of Interstate 44 and Route 43.

== History ==
The original highway only ran between Ridgedale and Route 43 (now Route 13) north of Blue Eye. It was later extended both east and west. The eastern terminus moving to Kissee Mills, with the route joined with U.S. Route 65 to modern-day Route 76 where it turned east and followed this road to Kissee Mills. It would later be truncated back to its later eastern terminus.

=== Recent and future improvements ===
Beginning in 2022, the Table Rock Lake crossing replacement project began and the new bridge opened in December 2024 replacing the 1956 crossing. In addition, the section of Route 86 from Thunder Ridge Road to US 65 was widened to 4 lanes in 2023.

== Major intersections ==
| County | Location | mi | km | Destinations | Notes |
|---|---|---|---|---|---|
| Newton | Joplin | 0.000 | 0.000 | I-44 / Route 43 south – Springfield, Tulsa I-44 BL east / Route 43 north (Hearnes Boulevard) | exit 6 on I-44 |
| Newton | Neosho | 16.394 | 26.384 | I-49 / US 71 – Joplin, Fort Smith I-49 BL begins | Western end of Loop 49 overlap |
| Newton | Neosho | 17.450 | 28.083 | Route 175 north – Tipton Ford | |
| Newton | Neosho | 19.167 | 30.846 | I-49 BL south | Eastern end of Loop 49 overlap |
| Newton | Neosho | 19.648 | 31.620 | US 60 Bus. west (Neosho Boulevard) | Western end of US 60 Business overlap |
| Newton | Neosho | 20.371 | 32.784 | US 60 Bus. east (College Street) | Eastern end of US 60 Business overlap |
| Newton | Neosho–Granby township line | 23.920 | 38.496 | US 60 west / Route 59 south – Neosho | Western end of US 60 / Route 59 overlap |
| Newton | Neosho–Granby township line | 24.170 | 38.898 | US 60 east / Route 59 north – Diamond | Eastern end of US 60 / Route 59 overlap |
| Barry | Pioneer Township | 40.797 | 65.656 | Route 97 north – Pierce City | |
| Barry | Wheaton–Liberty township line | 45.779 | 73.674 | Route 76 west – Anderson | West end of Route 76 overlap |
| Barry | Cassville | 58.991 | 94.937 | Route 37 / Route 112 north / Route 37 Bus. begins – Purdy, Washburn, Seligman | West end of Route 112 / Route 37 Bus. overlap |
| Barry | Cassville | 60.159 | 96.817 | Route 37 Bus. north (Main Street) – Monett | East end of Route 37 Bus. overlap |
| Barry | Cassville | 60.358 | 97.137 | Route 248 east | |
| Barry | Flat Creek Township | 61.915 | 99.643 | Route 112 south – Seligman, Roaring River State Park | East end of Route 112 overlap |
| Barry | Flat Creek Township | 64.579 | 103.930 | Route 76 east to Route 39 | East end of Route 76 overlap |
| Barry | Roaring River Township | 77.996 | 125.522 | Route P to AR 23 | |
| Barry | White River Township | 81.972 | 131.921 | Route H to AR 143 | |
| Stone | Carr Lane | 86.946 | 139.926 | Route 39 – Shell Knob, Berryville | |
| Stone | Pine Township | 95.833 | 154.228 | Route 13 north – Lampe | Western end of Route 13 overlap |
| Stone | Pine Township | 98.665 | 158.786 | Route 13 south – Blue Eye | Eastern end of Route 13 overlap |
| Taney | Oliver Township | 110.324 | 177.549 | US 65 – Branson, Harrison | |
1.000 mi = 1.609 km; 1.000 km = 0.621 mi: Concurrency terminus
