= Missouri Route 174 =

State highway in Missouri, U.S.

Route 174
- MO 174 highlighted in red

Route information
- Maintained by MoDOT
- Length: 20.740 mi (33.378 km)

Major junctions
- West end: Route 39 / Route 39 Bus. in Mount Vernon
- I-44 northeast of Mount Vernon
- East end: US 60 / Route 413 in Republic

Location
- Country: United States
- State: Missouri
- Counties: Lawrence, Greene County

Highway system
- Missouri State Highway System; Interstate; US; State; Supplemental
| ← Route 173 | → Route 175 |

Route 174 is a 20.740-mile (33.378 km) state highway in Lawrence and Greene counties in Missouri, United States, that connects Missouri Route 30 (Route 39) in Mount Vernon with U.S. Route 60 / Missouri Route 413 (US 60 / Route 413) in Republic.

== Route description ==
Route 174 is a two-lane highway its entire length and was originally part of U.S. Route 166 (US 166) between Republic and Mount Vernon. After the construction of Interstate 44, which replaced US 166 from Mount Vernon to Joplin, that section of US 166 was redesignated as Route 174.

Except for the endpoints, the only community on Route 174 is the census-designated place of Chesapeake.

== Major intersections ==
| County | Location | mi | km | Destinations | Notes |
|---|---|---|---|---|---|
| Lawrence | Mount Vernon | 0.000 | 0.000 | CR 1112 west | Continuation west from western terminus |
| Lawrence | Mount Vernon | 0.000 | 0.000 | Route 39 – Miller; Route 39 – I-44, Aurora, Shell Knob, Branson Route 39 Bus. begins | Western terminus; western end of Route 39 Bus. concurrency |
| Lawrence | Mount Vernon | 0.567 | 0.912 | CR 1132 north – Route 96 Route 39 Bus. south (Main Street) | Eastern end of Route 39 Bus. concurrency |
| Lawrence | Mount Vernon Township | | | Route M north – Route 96 | T intersection |
| Lawrence | Mount Vernon Township | 3.729– 3.751 | 6.001– 6.037 | I-44 east – Halltown, Springfield, St. Louis I-44 west – Mount Vernon, Route 97, Joplin, Tulsa (Oklahoma) | Diamond interchange; I-44 exit 49 |
| Greene | Republic | 20.715– 20.740 | 33.338– 33.378 | US 60 north / Route 413 east – Wilson's Creek National Battlefield, Springfield US 60 south / Route 413 west – Billings, Aurora, Neosho | Eastern teriminus |
| Greene | Republic | 20.715– 20.740 | 33.338– 33.378 | Unnamed roadway east – Walmart | Continuation east from eastern terminus |
1.000 mi = 1.609 km; 1.000 km = 0.621 mi: Concurrency terminus

== See also ==
- List of state highways in Missouri
- Route 38, designated in 1922, part of which is now Route 174.
