= Missouri Route 96 =

State highway in Missouri, U.S.

Route 96
- Route 96 highlighted in red

Route information
- Maintained by MoDOT
- Length: 52.323 mi (84.206 km)

Major junctions
- West end: Route 171 / Route YY north of Carl Junction
- I-49 / US 71 in Carthage
- East end: I-44 west of Halltown

Location
- Country: United States
- State: Missouri

Highway system
- Missouri State Highway System; Interstate; US; State; Supplemental
← Route 95	→ Route 97

Route 96 is a state highway that travels from Route 171 near Carl Junction, in Jasper County, to Interstate 44 (I-44) in Halltown, in Lawrence County. A large section of the highway between Carthage and Halltown served as part of U.S. Route 66 (US 66) and is currently marked as Historic Route 66.

The road was numbered due to its being an extension of K-96 and its eastern terminus was in Carthage. When US 66 was deleted east of Joplin, Route 96 was extended to replace US 66.

Route 96 was redesignated as Route YY west of Route 171 when Kansas deleted the eastern part of K-96.

== Route description ==
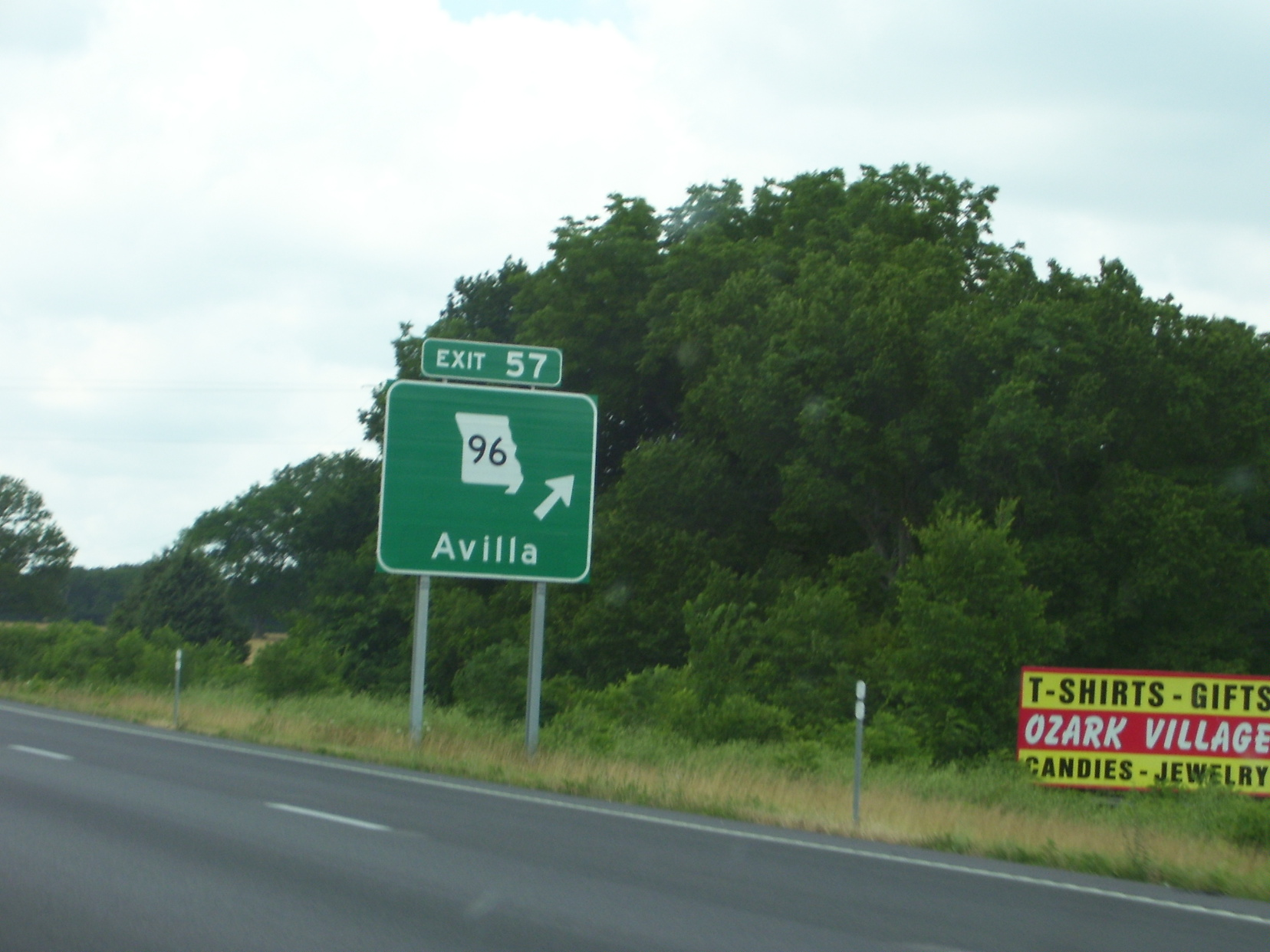
Route 96 exit from I-44

Route 96 begins at a partial interchange with Interstate 44 (I-44) just west of Halltown (there is no access to westbound I-44 or from eastbound I-44). The highway is a two-lane road and is relatively straight all the way to Carthage. Approximately 1 mile (1.6 km) west of I-44 is the western terminus of Route 266. Approximately 3 miles (4.8 km) further west, Route 96 is joined by Historic Route 66.

At Albatross, is an intersection with Route 39. Approximately 5 miles (8.0 km) further west is an intersection with Route 97. At Avilla, there is a 1-mile-long (1.6 km) concurrency with Route 37. As the road approaches Carthage, the highway curves south, then curves west again to become Central Street. At Garrison Avenue, the highway begins a concurrency with Route 571 and the road becomes a wide boulevard.

1 mile (1.6 km) west of Garrison Avenue is an interchange with I-49/US 71. At this point, Route 571 ends and Route 171 and Business I-49, both of which join Route 96 and the road is a freeway. The first exit west of I-49/US 71, Route 96 turns off and becomes a two-lane road again. North of Joplin, Route 96 intersects Route 43. Approximately 3 miles (4.8 km) further west, Route 96 ends at Route 171.

== History ==
Originally, Route 96 continued across Route 171 and turned south, curving around the west side of Carl Junction. The road then traveled 2 miles (3.2 km) further west and crossed the Kansas state line.

== Major intersections ==
County	Location	mi	km	Destinations	Notes
Jasper	Twin Groves Township	0.000	0.000	Route 171 / Route YY – Kansas, Joplin, Pittsburg	Roundabout; western terminus; Route YY is former Route 96 west
Jasper	Twin Groves–Mineral township line	2.794	4.497	Route 43 – Joplin	Roundabout
Jasper	Marion Township	11.448	18.424	I-49 BL west / Route 171 north – Webb City	Interchange; western end of I-49 BL/Route 171 overlap
Jasper	Carthage	13.103	21.087	I-49 / US 71 – Joplin, Kansas City I-49 BL ends / Route 171 ends / Route 571 begins	Interchange; eastern end of I-49 BL/Route 171 overlap; I-49 exit 53; western end of Route 571 overlap
Jasper	Carthage	14.181	22.822	Route 571 south / Historic US 66 west (Garrison Avenue)	Eastern end of Route 571 overlap; western end of Hist. US 66 overlap
Jasper	McDonald Township	24.078	38.750	Route 37 south – Reeds	Western end of Route 37 overlap
Jasper	Avilla	25.042	40.301	Route 37 north – Golden City	Eastern end of Route 36 overlap
Lawrence	Green Township	35.004	56.333	Route 97 – Stotts City, Lockwood	
Lawrence	Albatross	40.777	65.624	Route 39 – Miller, Mount Vernon	
Lawrence	Ozark Township	47.498	76.441	Historic US 66 east	Eastern end of Hist. US 66 overlap
Lawrence	Ozark Township	49.006	78.868	Route N south / Historic US 66	Northern terminus of Route N
Lawrence	Ozark Township	50.302	80.953	Route 266 east – Halltown	
Lawrence	Ozark Township	52.323	84.206	I-44 east	Eastern terminus; I-44 exit 57; no access to I-44 west
1.000 mi = 1.609 km; 1.000 km = 0.621 mi: Concurrency terminus; Incomplete access
