= Missouri Route 744 =

State highway in Missouri, U.S.

Route 744
- Kearney Street
- MO 744 highlighted in red

Route information
- Maintained by MoDOT
- Length: 11.331 mi (18.235 km)

Major junctions
- West end: Springfield–Branson National Airport
- US 160; US 65
- East end: I-44

Location
- Country: United States
- State: Missouri
- County: Greene

Highway system
- Missouri State Highway System; Interstate; US; State; Supplemental
← Route 740	→ Route 752

Route 744 is located entirely within the city limits of Springfield, in the U.S. state of Missouri, where it is known locally as Kearney Street. Its western terminus is at the Springfield–Branson National Airport. Its eastern terminus is at Interstate 44 (I-44). The section east of Glenstone Avenue (Business Loop 44) is part of historic U.S. Route 66 (US 66). The section between Glenstone and West Bypass (US 160) was a part of US 66 Bypass. Route 744 was numbered after nearby I-44.

== Major intersections ==
The entire route is in Springfield, Greene County.

mi	km	Destinations	Notes
0.000	0.000	Springfield–Branson National Airport entrance	Western terminus
1.763	2.837	US 160 (West Bypass) to I-44	
3.772	6.070	Route 13 (Kansas Expressway)	
6.541	10.527	I-44 BL (Glenstone Avenue)	
8.488– 8.580	13.660– 13.808	US 65	Interchange
11.065	17.807	Route OO	
11.231– 11.331	18.075– 18.235	I-44	Eastern terminus; exit 84
1.000 mi = 1.609 km; 1.000 km = 0.621 mi
