= Missouri Route 175 =

State highway in Missouri, U.S.

Route 175
- MO 175 highlighted in red

Route information
- Maintained by MoDOT
- Length: 6.502 mi (10.464 km)

Major junctions
- South end: I-49 BL / Route 86 in Neosho
- North end: I-49 / US 71 / I-49 BL at Tipton Ford

Location
- Country: United States
- State: Missouri

Highway system
- Missouri State Highway System; Interstate; US; State; Supplemental
← Route 174	→ Route 176

Route 175 is a short highway in Newton County running from Interstate 49/U.S. Route 71 at Tipton Ford to the city of Neosho at Business I-49 and Route 86. It is a former alignment of US 71, and the endpoints of Neosho and unincorporated Tipton Ford are the only cities on the route.

== Route description ==
Route 175 begins at an intersection with I-49 Bus./Route 86 northwest of Neosho, heading north on two-lane undivided Gateway Drive. The road passes through areas of fields and woods with some homes. The route continues through rural areas, making a curve to the northwest and coming to an interchange with I-49/US 71 in Tipton Ford. Past this interchange, the road continues northwest as I-49 Bus. toward Joplin.

== Major intersections ==
The entire route is in Newton County.

Location	mi	km	Destinations	Notes
Neosho	0.000	0.000	I-49 BL / Route 86 (Gateway Drive)	
Tipton Ford	6.430– 6.447	10.348– 10.375	I-49 / US 71	Interchange; exit 33
Tipton Ford	6.502	10.464	I-49 BL north (Gateway Drive)	Continuation beyond US 71
1.000 mi = 1.609 km; 1.000 km = 0.621 mi
