= Special routes of U.S. Route 66 =

Portions of U.S. Route 66 that are or have historically been designated special routes

Special routes of U.S. Route 66

Highway system
- United States Numbered Highway System; List; Special; Divided

There have been 22 special routes of U.S. Route 66 (US 66). These special routes included alternate routes, business loops and bypass routes in four states along the route of the former US 66.

== California ==
=== Los Angeles alternate route ===
U.S. Route 66 Alternate
- Location: Los Angeles, CA
- Existed: 1938–1964

Alternate U.S. Route 66 was a designation to preserve the next-to-last routing of US 66 from Pasadena to Los Angeles, California, when the signage for US 66 was transferred to the Arroyo Seco Parkway (also known as the Pasadena Freeway, which alignment lasted from 1938 to 1964, when Alternate US 66 was eliminated as well as Historic Arroyo Seco Parkway into SR 11, and became SR 110 in 1981.

The routing from Pasadena to Los Angeles was west on Colorado Boulevard and then south on Figueroa Street. The end of the Pasadena Freeway then blended into Figueroa Street, and the alternate route rejoined its parent route. The routing along Figueroa Street and the portion along Colorado Boulevard between Linda Vista Avenue and Figueroa Street also bore the designation of State Route 11.

=== San Bernardino business loop ===
U.S. Route 66 Business
- Location: San Bernardino, CA
- Existed: 1964

Business US 66 in San Bernardino, sometimes rendered "City" US 66 on contemporary maps, was a short business loop that existed in the city from the late 1940s until US 66 was decommissioned in California in 1964. Designated as Legislative Route Number 191, its former alignment continued east from the junction of US 66, former US 91 and former US 395 at Mount Vernon Avenue and 5th St, east along 5th Street and then north on E Street. E Street continued on to become modern Kendall Drive, rejoining the US 66 mainline at Cajon Boulevard near Devore. Part of this routing included the former alignment of State Route 18 prior to its truncation. In 1959, the routing was truncated to Palm Avenue with the construction of the Barstow Freeway. After 1964, the routing became State Route 206, which was decommissioned in 1991 and is no longer signed.

== Texas ==
=== Amarillo business loop ===
Business U.S. Highway 66
- Location: Amarillo, TX
- Existed: 1954–1985

Business US 66 in Amarillo followed the original alignment of US 66 when the later alignment was moved to Amarillo Boulevard. It began at Amarillo Boulevard, turning south on Taylor Street (one way, the east-bound route was on Fillmore Street). At Sixth Street it turned west, rejoining the main route at Amarillo Boulevard on the west side of the city.

== Oklahoma ==
=== Clinton business loop ===
U.S. Highway 66 Business
- Location: Clinton, OK

=== Oklahoma City business loop ===
U.S. Highway 66 Business
- Location: Oklahoma City, OK

Business US 66 in Oklahoma City followed the older alignment of US 66 after the main route was moved to the interstates. The original highway turned south from Edmond going into Oklahoma City, but the main route was moved onto Interstate 35. The beginning of the business route was at Lincoln Boulevard (in a concurrency with U.S. Route 77), leaving the main route on Interstate 440 (now Interstate 44). At 23rd Street (in front of the State Capitol), the two routes formed a tri-plex with U.S. Route 270 and turned west. US 77 turned off the multiplex at Broadway. At May Avenue, the Business US 66/US 270 routes turned north (forming a quadplex with Oklahoma State Highway 3 and Oklahoma State Highway 74). At I-440/US 66, the Business US 66 designation ended; the main route (along with US 270) continued west on the 39th Expressway (now Oklahoma State Highway 66).

=== Tulsa business loop ===
U.S. Highway 66 Business
- Location: Tulsa, OK

Business US 66 in Tulsa was an older alignment of US 66 that was redesignated when US 66 was moved to Interstate 44. It followed 11th Street west west from I-44 to 12th St (it angles downtown onto 10th Street briefly, then re-aligns as 11th Street). It turned south at Southwest Boulevard, rejoining the main route at I-44.

== Missouri ==
=== Joplin alternate route ===
U.S. Route 66 Alternate
- Location: Joplin, MO

Alternate US 66 was an alternate route of U.S. Route 66 in the Joplin, Missouri area. It left the main route in Webb City by continuing west on Broadway (the main route turned south on Jefferson Street), angled off as MacArthur Boulevard, then turned south on Main Ave, passing through Airport Drive and into Joplin. It ended at Seventh Street in Joplin. Part of the road is now city street, the rest is Route 171 and Route 43.

=== Joplin bypass route ===
U.S. Route 66 Bypass
- Location: Bypass around Joplin, MO

Bypass US 66 in Joplin, Missouri was a bypass route of U.S. Route 66. In the northern part of Joplin, US 66 headed on a zig-zag course towards the downtown area; Bypass US 66 continued south on Rangeline Road (then also U.S. Route 71, then turned west on Seventh Street (now Route 66). The road would eventually become the main route of US 66, with the older alignment becoming Business US 66.

=== Joplin business loop ===
U.S. Route 66 Business
- Location: Joplin, MO

Business US 66 in Joplin, Missouri was a business route of U.S. Route 66 and was the former alignment of the main road. It was created when the main route was moved to the bypass route of the highway. The road followed the now historic alignment of the highway (Zora Street, Florida Avenue, Utica Street, Euclid Street, St. Louis Avenue, Broadway, and Main Avenue), all of which (except Main) are now city streets. Main Avenue is part of Route 43. This road would later serve as part of U.S. Route 71 Business (Joplin), but this road no longer serves that path.

=== Webb City business loop ===
U.S. Route 66 Business
- Location: Webb City, MO

Business US 66 in Webb City, Missouri was a business route of U.S. Route 66. The main route, which had been routed down a concurrency with U.S. Route 71, now headed down a four lane expressway. A business route was created, following the older alignment through Carterville and continuing to downtown Webb City. At Main Street, it turned off the old route to rejoin to main route.

=== Carthage alternate route ===
U.S. Route 66 Alternate
- Location: Carthage, MO

U.S. Route 66 Alternate was a short one-mile (1.6 km) spur of U.S. Route 66. Its southeast to northwest alignment ran from US 66 just northeast of Carthage, Missouri to U.S. Route 71 at Kendricktown, Missouri. Alternate 66 became Route V in the early 1970s.

=== Springfield bypass route ===
U.S. Route 66 Bypass
- Location: Springfield, Missouri

Bypass US 66 in Springfield, Missouri was a short lived bypass created when Interstate 44 was built on the north side of the city and the main route was concurrent with I-44. It was located on Kearney Street and West Bypass and, as the city expanded across it, was redesignated Business US 66 when that route was moved from downtown. Much (but not all of the highway) is currently Route 744.

=== Springfield, MO business loop ===
U.S. Route 66 Business
- Location: Springfield, MO
- Existed: 1948–1970

Business US Highway 66 (also "City US 66" until 1960) was an old alignment of U.S. Route 66 in Springfield, Missouri. In 1948, US 66 was moved from downtown (it followed Glenstone Avenue, St. Louis Street, College Street, and Chestnut Expressway) onto a new alignment onto Kearney Street (now Route 744) and West Bypass and the old highway became the business route. With the completion of Interstate 44, Business I-44 was concurrent with it and US 66 was concurrent with I-44 (Kearney Street became, briefly, Bypass 66). By the late 1960s, Bypass 66 was deleted and the old bypass became the new Business 66 (the old BUS 66 was left as Business I-44 for a while, then turned over to the city). In 1970, Business 66 was done away with entirely.

==== Alternate business loop ====
U.S. Route 66 Business Alternate
- Location: Springfield, MO

Alternate Business US 66 was a second business alignment of U.S. Route 66 in Springfield, Missouri. Business US 66 turned south from Kearney Street down Glenstone to St. Louis Street and then west to Park Central Square. At Commercial Street, Alternate Business US 66 headed west to Boonville Avenue, then south to rejoin Business US 66 at the city square.

=== Lebanon business loop ===
U.S. Route 66 Business
- Location: Lebanon, MO

Business US Highway 66 was an older alignment of US 66 in Lebanon, Missouri. It followed Elm Street through the city and later became Business Loop I-44. US 66 became part of Interstate 44. It existed in the 1960s.

=== Rolla business loop ===
U.S. Route 66 Business
- Location: Rolla, MO

Business US Highway 66 was an older alignment of US 66 in Rolla, Missouri. It followed Kingshighway and Bishop Avenue through the city and is now Business Loop I-44. US 66 had been moved and later became part of Interstate 44. It existed in the 1960s.

=== St. Louis bypass route ===
U.S. Route 66 Bypass
- Location: St. Louis, Missouri

Bypass US 66 around the St. Louis area was the designation for the relocated U.S. Route 66, commissioned as a bypass in 1958. Bypass US 66 is now (roughly) Interstate 270 and Lindbergh Boulevard (U.S. Route 61/U.S. Route 67).

Until 1969, when Business US 66 was returned to the US 66 designation, no non-special US 66 existed in the St. Louis area. In 1938, US 66 was moved on a bypass around the city of St. Louis. The original alignment of US 66 became the business route. In 1969, the business route, now joined with the East St. Louis business route was redesignated US 66, while Bypass US 66 was redesignated Interstate 270.

=== St. Louis optional route ===
U.S. Route 66 Optional
- Location: St. Louis, MO–Venice, IL

=== St. Louis business loop ===
U.S. Route 66 Business
- Location: St. Louis, MO

Business US 66 in the St. Louis, Missouri area was actually one of two business routes in the entire metro St. Louis area. A separate Business US 66 existed in the East St. Louis, Illinois area. In 1939, US 66 was routed over the Chain of Rocks Bridge to have the route bypass the city. Non-special 66 continued west down, roughly, Interstate 270 to Lindbergh Boulevard, then south to rejoin the original alignment down Watson Road. The business route turned south on Riverview, Broadway, Florissant Ave, Tucker Boulevard (then 12th Street), then southwest on Gravois Road, then west-southwest on Chippewa Street (which becomes Watson Road in the suburbs). The road was originally designated "City" 66, but in 1960 it became "Business" 66, a trend seen on other city routes across the country. The East St. Louis Business 66 connected with the St. Louis Business 66 at the MacArthur Bridge connection with Gravois Road. By 1969, Business 66 returned (via the East St. Louis route) to being non-special US 66.

Currently, Riverview, Broadway, Florissant, and Tucker are now city streets. Gravois Road is Route 30, and Chippewa Street and Watson Road are now Route 366.

== Illinois ==
=== East St. Louis business loop ===
U.S. Route 66 Business
- Location: East St. Louis, IL

Business US 66 in the East St. Louis, Illinois area followed the older main alignment of U.S. Highway 66 through St. Louis metropolitan area when US 66 was routed around the north and west sides of St. Louis. It followed Nameoki Road, Edwardsville Road, and 10th Street, eventually crossing the MacArthur Bridge to join (a different) Business US 66 in St. Louis. The route was created in 1938, and the designation was removed in 1969. The road is now predominantly Illinois State Route 203, and (in East St. Louis) a city street.

=== Springfield, IL business loop ===
U.S. Route 66 Business
- Location: Springfield, IL

U.S. Route 66 Business was the old alignment of U.S. Route 66 through Springfield, Illinois, United States after the bypass along Adlai Stevenson Drive and Dirksen Parkway opened ca. 1939. It was originally designated U.S. Route 66 City, and changed to a business route ca. 1960. In the early 1960s a one-way pair was added; after that it came from the south on 6th Street and split into 6th and 5th Streets, turning east on Myrtle and Spruce Streets to reach 9th Street. It used 9th Street into Peoria Road to end at Dirksen Parkway north of Springfield. When US 66 was removed from Springfield ca. 1979, Interstate 55 Business was designated not on what had been US 66 but on former US 66 Business through downtown. This is now also marked as Historic US 66.

=== Lincoln business loop ===
U.S. Route 66 Business
- Location: Lincoln, IL

=== Bloomington business loop ===
U.S. Route 66 Business
- Location: Bloomington, Illinois
- Existed: 1942–June 1974

=== Joliet alternate route ===
U.S. Route 66 Alternate
- Location: Joliet, IL
- Length: 40 mi (64 km)
- Existed: 1940–February 1967

Alternate US Highway 66 was designated in 1940 when a new alignment of Route 66 opened, passing through Plainfield, Illinois and bypassing Joliet. Alternate US 66 branched off the main route near Romeoville and headed south, finally rejoining the main route at Gardner. Its total length was about 40 miles (64 km). The highway is now designated Illinois Route 53 after US 66 Alternate was eliminated in February 1967. The later "main" alignment of US 66 is near (and in some cases under) Interstate 55.
