= Irwin, Missouri =

Unincorporated community in Missouri, U.S.

- Census-designated place & unincorporated community
- Location within Missouri
- Coordinates: 37°35′19″N 94°17′14″W
- Country: United States
- State: Missouri
- Counties: Barton

Area
  - Total: 0.30 sq mi (0.78 km^{2})
  - Land: 0.30 sq mi (0.77 km^{2})
  - Water: 0.0077 sq mi (0.02 km^{2})
- Elevation: 968 ft (295 m)

Population (2020)
  - Total: 47
  - Density: 158.7/sq mi (61.26/km^{2})
- Time zone: UTC-6 (Central (CST))
  - Summer (DST): UTC-5 (CDT)
- ZIP code: 64759
- Area code: 417
- FIPS code: 29-35486
- GNIS feature ID: 2587082

Irwin is an unincorporated community and census-designated place in northern Barton County, Missouri, United States. As of the 2020 census it had a population of 47.

== History ==
Irwin was platted in 1884. The community has the name of the Irwin family of settlers. A post office called Irwin was established in 1884, and remained in operation until 1981.

== Geography ==
Irwin is located halfway between Lamar and Sheldon on U.S. Route 71 (Interstate 49).

According to the United States Census Bureau, the CDP has a total area of 0.30 square miles (0.78 km^{2}), of which 0.0077 square miles (0.02 km^{2}), or 2.00%, is water.

== Demographics ==
Historical population
Census	Pop.	Note	%±
2020	47		—
U.S. Decennial Census
