= Missouri Route 571 =

State highway in Missouri, U.S.

Route 571

Route information
- Maintained by MoDOT
- Length: 4.484 mi (7.216 km)

Major junctions
- South end: I-49 / US 71 in Carthage
- Route 96 in Carthage
- North end: I-49 / US 71 / I-49 BL / Route 96 / Route 171 in Carthage

Location
- Country: United States
- State: Missouri
- Counties: Jasper

Highway system
- Missouri State Highway System; Interstate; US; State; Supplemental
← I-470	→ I-635

Route 571 is a two-lane highway in Carthage, Missouri, replacing a former section of U.S. Route 71 Alternate (US 71 Alt.) with the realignment of US 71. Both termini are at Interstate 49 (I-49) and US 71; its northern terminus is Business I-49 and Route 171 at the western edge of Carthage and its southern terminus is I-49/US 71 at the southern edge of Carthage.

== Route description ==
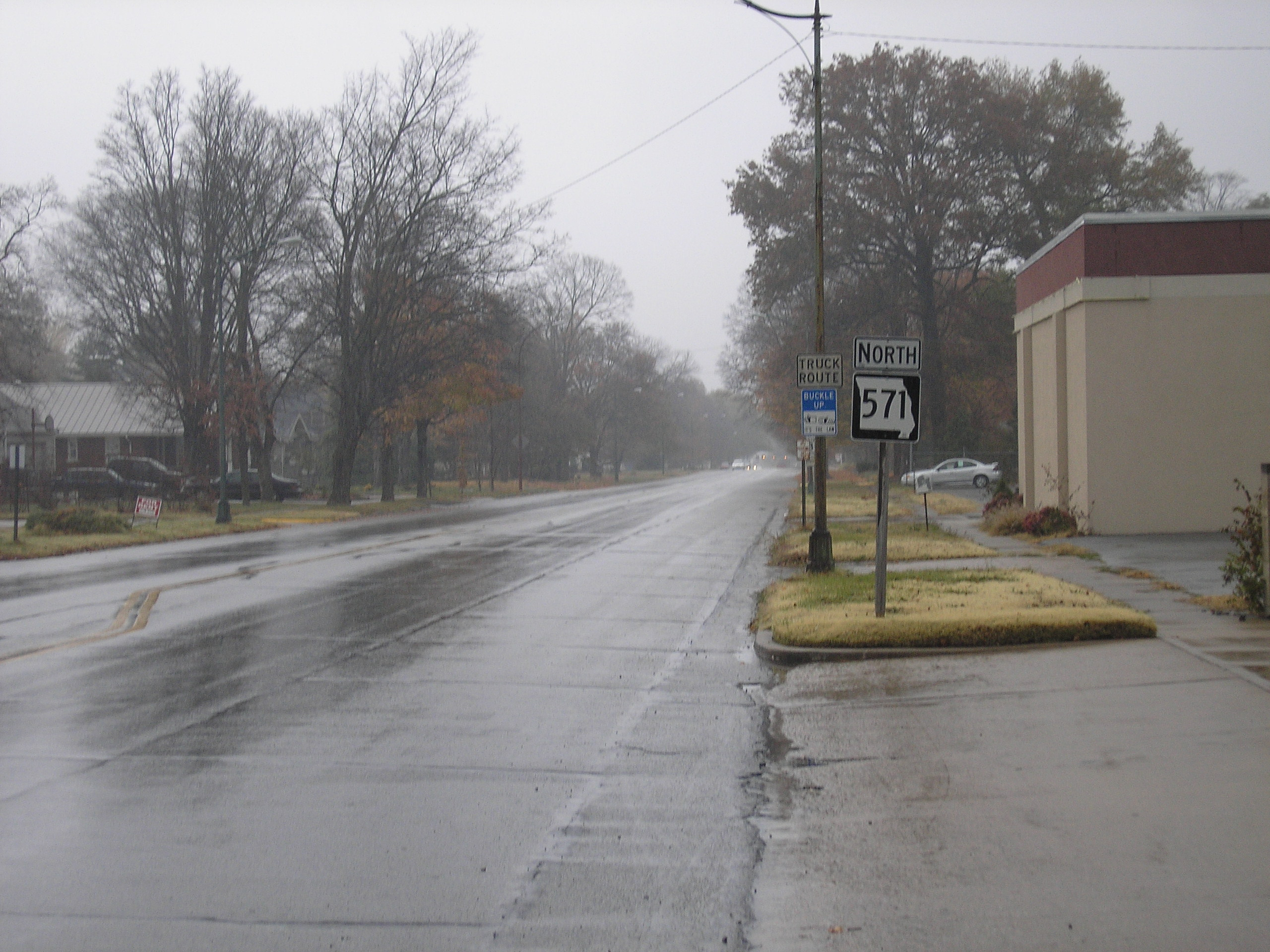
Route 571 heading northbound on a rainy day in Carthage.

Route 571 begins at a fork from the right-of-way of I-49 and US 71 (Trooper Charles P. Corbin Memorial Highway) southbound. The designation follows South Grand Avenue, a commercial strip into a roundabout with Airport Drive before continuing northwest as Fairlawn Avenue. After turning back to the north, the designation changes once more to South Garrison Avenue. About 1.8 miles (2.9 km) up the road at the intersection with West Central Avenue (Route 96), Route 571 turns westward, creating a concurrency. The two highways create a commercial strip down West Central, crossing under the railroad near North Parsons Street. Route 571 terminates at an interchange with I-49/US 71 (Trooper Charles P. Corbin Memorial Highway) in Carthage, Missouri, which also serves as the eastern termini for Interstate 49 Business (BL I-49) and Route 171. Route 96, which is concurrent with Route 171 and BL I-49, continues eastward along West Central Avenue.

== History ==
Previously, Route 571 had continued north of Central Avenue along the original alignment of US 71 up to an exit ramp at US 71 north of town. The highway was moved its current route along Central Avenue to take traffic off of the two bridges near Kendricktown. The section between Central Avenue and Kendricktown is no longer part of the state highway system. The portion north of Kendricktown to US 71 is now Route V, which was extended northward to US 71 when Route 571 was moved.

== Junction list ==
The entire route is in Carthage, Jasper County.

mi	km	Destinations	Notes
0.000	0.000	I-49 south / US 71 south	Southern terminus; exit 49 on I-49
0.605	0.974	Route HH	
1.712	2.755	Route E (West Fairview Avenue)	
4.236	6.817	Route 96 east (West Central Avenue)	Southern end of Route 96 concurrency
4.484	7.216	I-49 / US 71	Exit 53 on I-49
4.484	7.216	I-49 BL south / Route 96 west / Route 171 north	Continuation north; northern end of Route 96 concurrency
1.000 mi = 1.609 km; 1.000 km = 0.621 mi: Concurrency terminus
