= Munger-Moss Motel =

Motel in Lebanon, Missouri

Munger Moss Motel
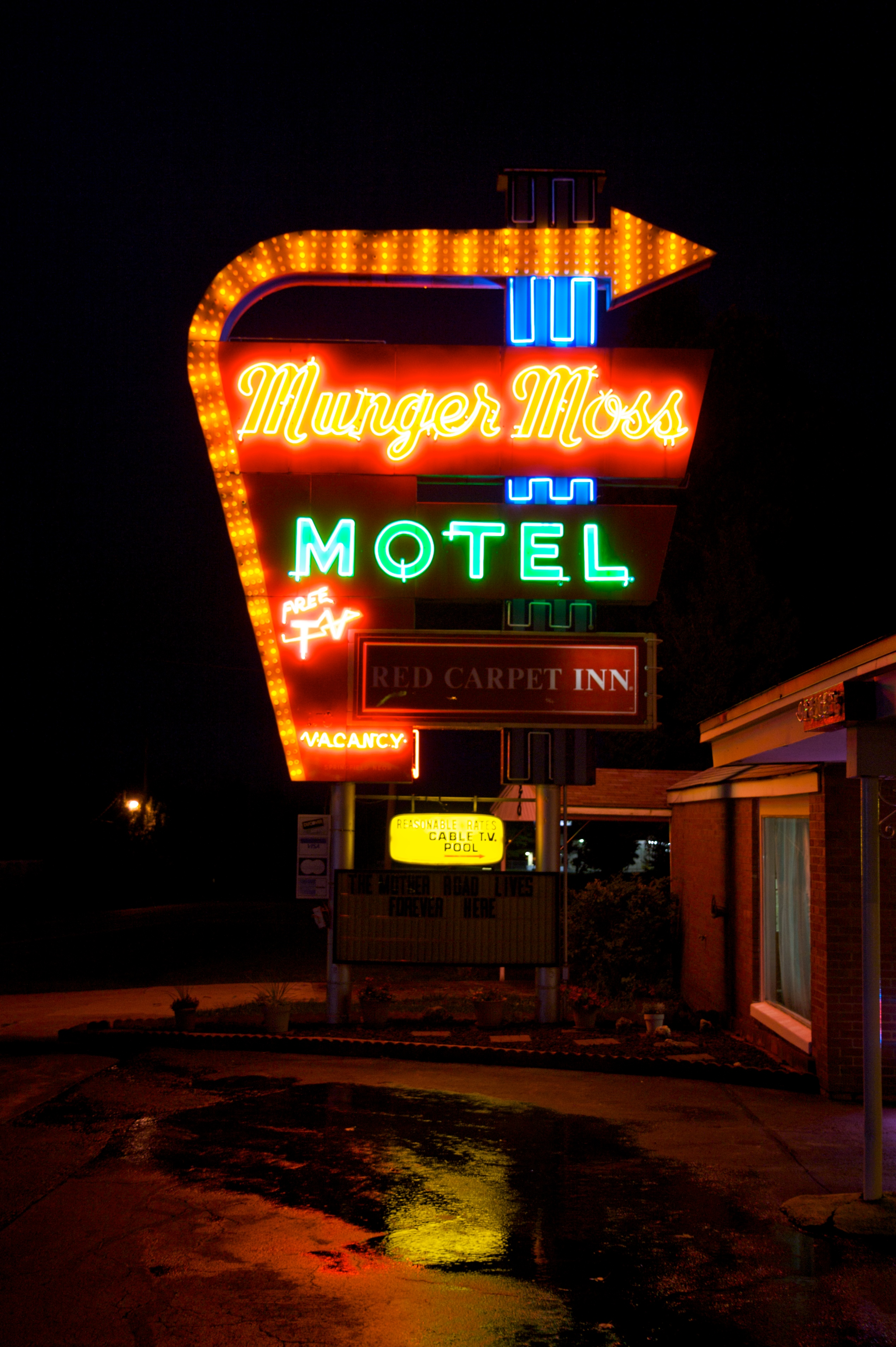

General information
- Location: Lebanon, Missouri, 1336 East US 66, East Seminole Avenue
- Coordinates: 37.6864°N 92.64°W
- Opening: 1936 (as restaurant); 1946 (as motel)
- Closed: 1970s (restaurant)
- Owner: Bob & Ramona Lehman

Other information
- Number of rooms: 14 (in 1946); 44 (in 1971)
- Number of restaurants: 1 (now demolished)
- Parking: on-site

Website
- mungermoss.com

The Munger Moss Motel is a motel in Lebanon, Missouri. It was built in 1946 as an addition to a roadside restaurant and filling station, both of which are now gone. The site's Munger-Moss Sandwich Shop served travellers on U.S. Route 66 in Missouri, circa 1936. Located on the Big Piney River at Devil's Elbow, Missouri until 1945 (at what is now the Elbow Inn), it relocated to Lebanon, Missouri after World War II when construction of a four-lane bypass of U.S. Route 66 in Missouri to Fort Leonard Wood drew traffic away from the original Munger Moss BBQ site.

== History ==
The restaurant was named for Nelle Munger, its original owner, and her second husband Emmett Moss. This name was retained after the business was sold to Pete and Jesse Hudson in 1945, relocated to the former Chicken Shanty site in Lebanon in September 1945 and expanded with tourist cabins in 1946. The current owners purchased the motel in June 1971.

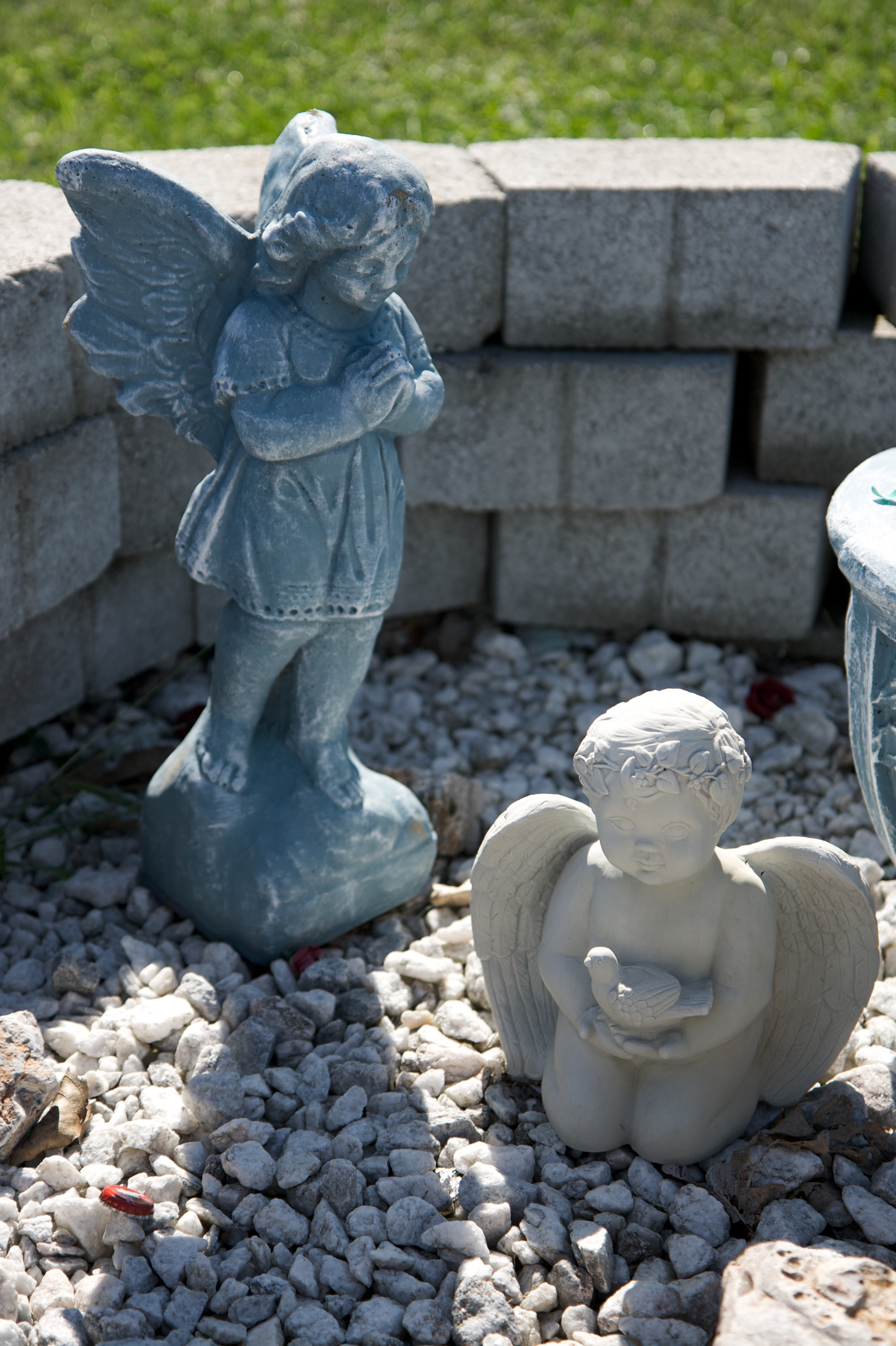
Statuary in the motel garden

The lodgings were originally constructed as a 14-room cabin court, an early motel-like accommodation in which each pair of rooms stood as a free-standing building with carports in the middle. Much as cabins and motor courts replaced the campgrounds that had served Depression-era motorists, motels with multiple rooms in one building would replace individual cabins in the 1950s. Space initially allocated to individual carports or open ground between cabins would soon be filled with additional rooms.

While the post-war era brought a huge increase in tourism as auto manufacturers returned to civilian production and wartime rationing of fuel and tires ended, the 1950s would also bring increased competition both from other independents and from chains such as Holiday Inn (founded 1952 in Memphis, Tennessee). The aggressively-expanding motel would add elaborate neon signage to rival the chain motel's Great Sign, in-room televisions, air conditioning and an outdoor swimming pool to remain competitive.

When U.S. Route 66 was upgraded to a four-lane highway in 1957 and ultimately bypassed by the parallel Interstate 44 in Missouri, all small independent motorist-oriented businesses were adversely affected to varying degrees. The Stony Dell Resort in Arlington became a ghost resort in a ghost town while John's Modern Cabins were abandoned and continue to deteriorate as a ghost tourist court. Munger-Moss was more fortunate; its location was one where Interstate 44 closely paralleled US 66 and the closest off-ramp was within a half-mile of the motel. While freeway construction represented disruption, the Munger Moss remained in continuous operation as an independent local motel and added 26 more units in 1961.

It currently has 44 rooms and 16 efficiencies. In 2010, its neon signage was restored using a $10300 National Park Service matching grant as part of larger U.S. Route 66 historic corridor preservation efforts.

== See also ==
- List of motels
