= Albatross, Missouri =

Unincorporated community in Missouri, U.S.

Coordinates: 37°11′21″N 93°50′21″W

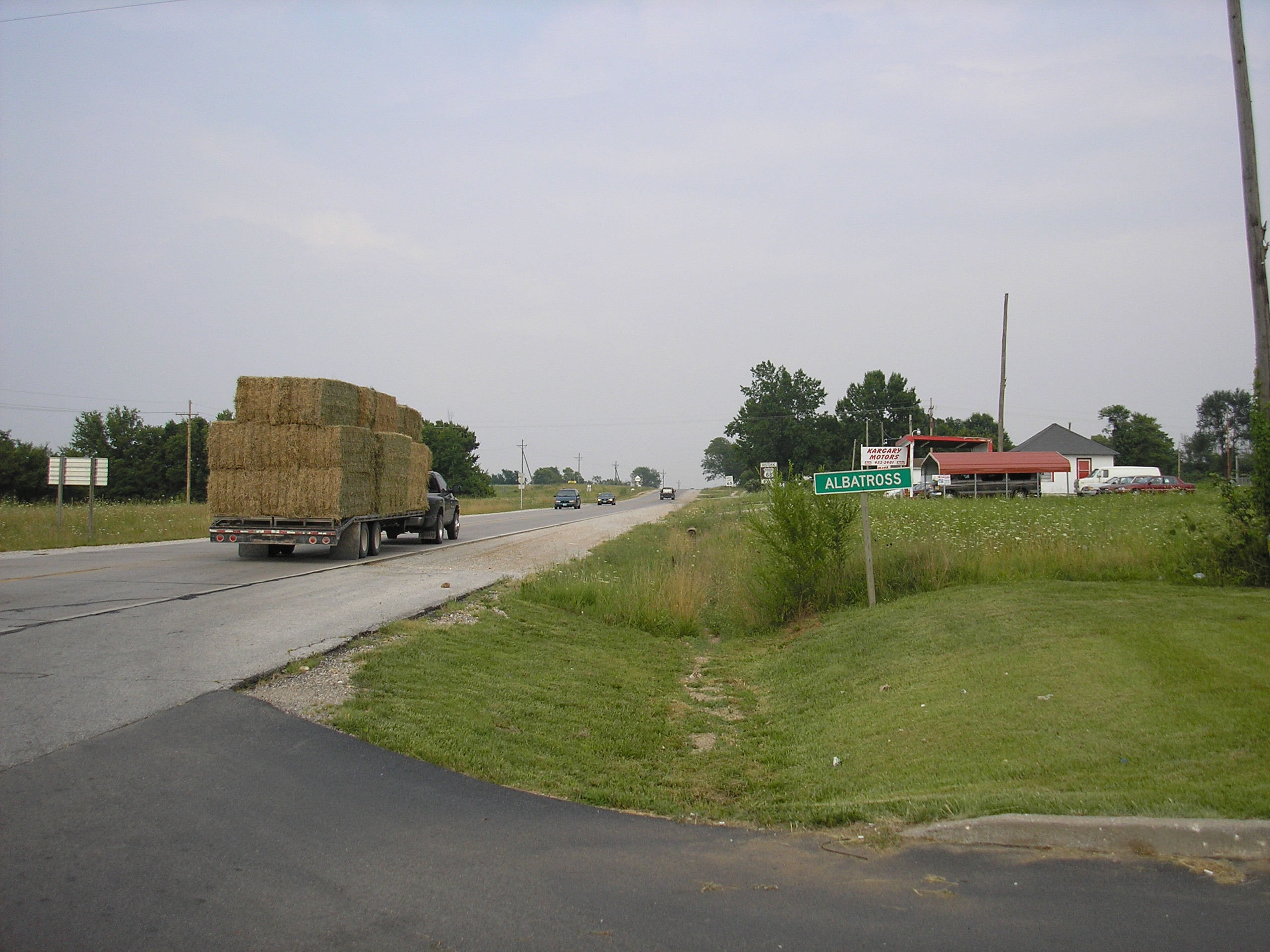
Albatross, Missouri, on Route 96, former US 66

Albatross is an unincorporated community in Lawrence County, Missouri, United States. It lies near the intersection of Routes 39 and 96, approximately six miles (10 km) north of Mount Vernon and two miles south of Miller.

Albatross was laid out in 1926, taking its name from Albatross Bus Line company.
