= Interstate 49 in Missouri =

Highway in Missouri

Interstate 49
- I-49 highlighted in red

Route information
- Maintained by MoDOT
- Length: 183.96 mi (296.05 km)
- Existed: December 12, 2012–present
- NHS: Entire route

Major junctions
- South end: I-49 at the Arkansas state line near Bella Vista, AR
- US 71 in Pineville; US 60 in Neosho; I-44 / Route 249 in Joplin; Route 171 in Jasper; US 160 in Lamar; US 54 in Nevada
- North end: I-435 / I-470 / US 50 / US 71 in Kansas City

Location
- Country: United States
- State: Missouri
- Counties: McDonald, Newton, Jasper, Barton, Vernon, Bates, Cass, Jackson

Highway system
- Interstate Highway System; Main; Auxiliary; Suffixed; Business; Future; Missouri State Highway System; Interstate; US; State; Supplemental
← Route 48	→ Route 49

Interstate 49 (I-49) is an Interstate Highway in the US state of Missouri that was designated on December 12, 2012. It overlaps U.S. Route 71 (US 71) in the western part of the state, beginning at the Arkansas state line, and ending at I-435 and I-470 on the southeast side of Kansas City.

Upon completion, the highway will connect Kansas City to Texarkana, Arkansas and Shreveport along with Lafayette, Louisiana and New Orleans, Louisiana.

== Route description ==
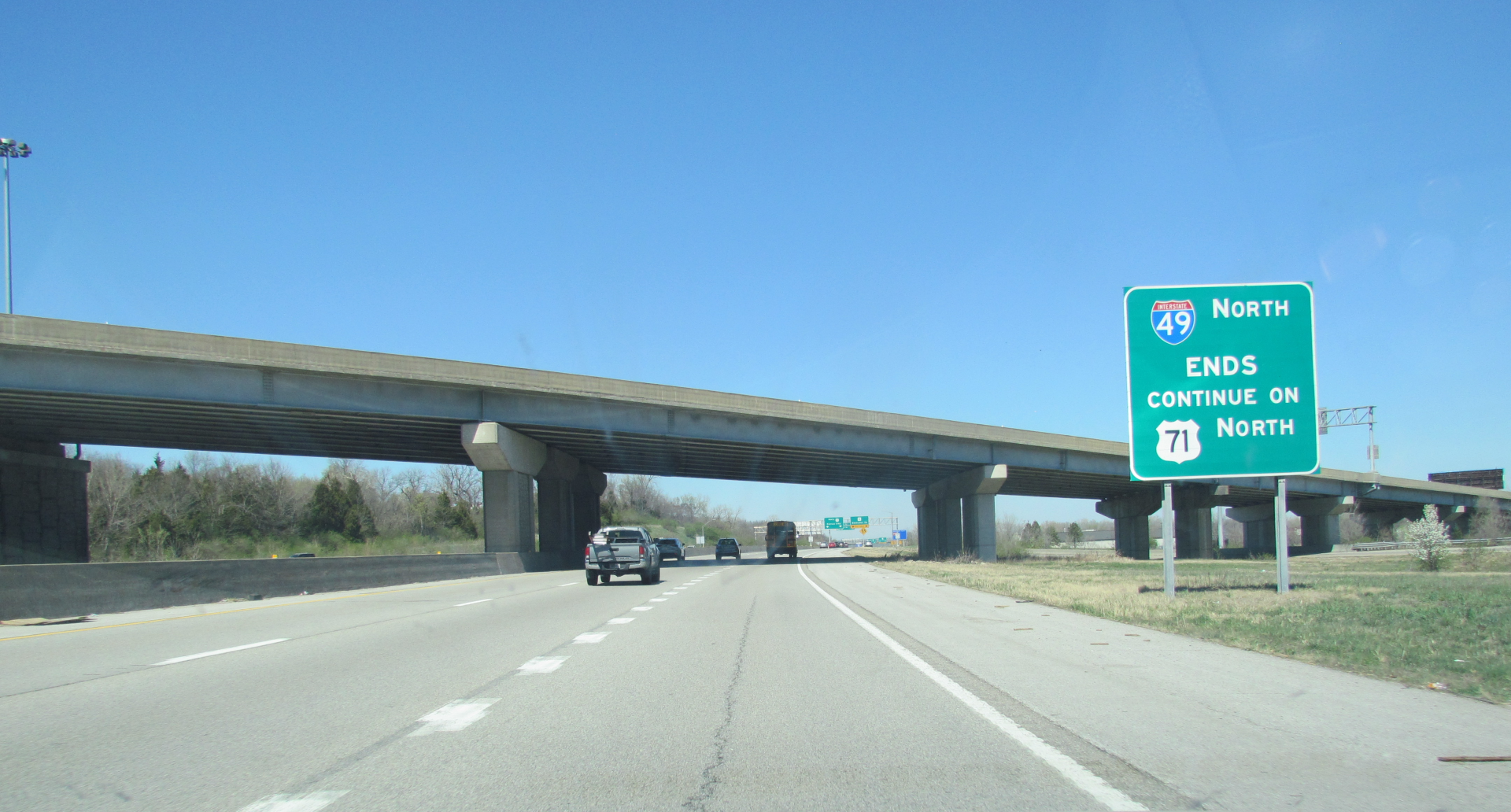
Northern terminus of I-49 at the Grandview Triangle in Kansas City, Missouri

I-49 enters Missouri from the Arkansas state line on the Bella Vista Bypass near Pineville. After continuing north for five miles (8.0 km), US 71 rejoins I-49 at exit 4 and is concurrent with it for the remainder of its length. It passes through many smaller communities before reaching Joplin. In Joplin, I-49 junctions with I-44 and begins a short overlap with I-44 between exits 11 and 18, heading east.

Just a few miles east of Joplin, I-49 leaves I-44, heads north, and enters Carthage. I-49 then passes through Nevada and other communities before reaching the Kansas City area. I-49 intersects with I-470 and I-435, which provide connections to I-70, Downtown Loop, I-35, and I-29.

In south Kansas City, at Bannister Road just north of the Grandview Triangle, the I-49 designation ends, the freeway continues as US 71, which proceeds into downtown Kansas City as Bruce R. Watkins Memorial Drive.

=== Transit ===
Jefferson Lines provides intercity bus service along the length of I-49 in Missouri serving five communities.

== History ==
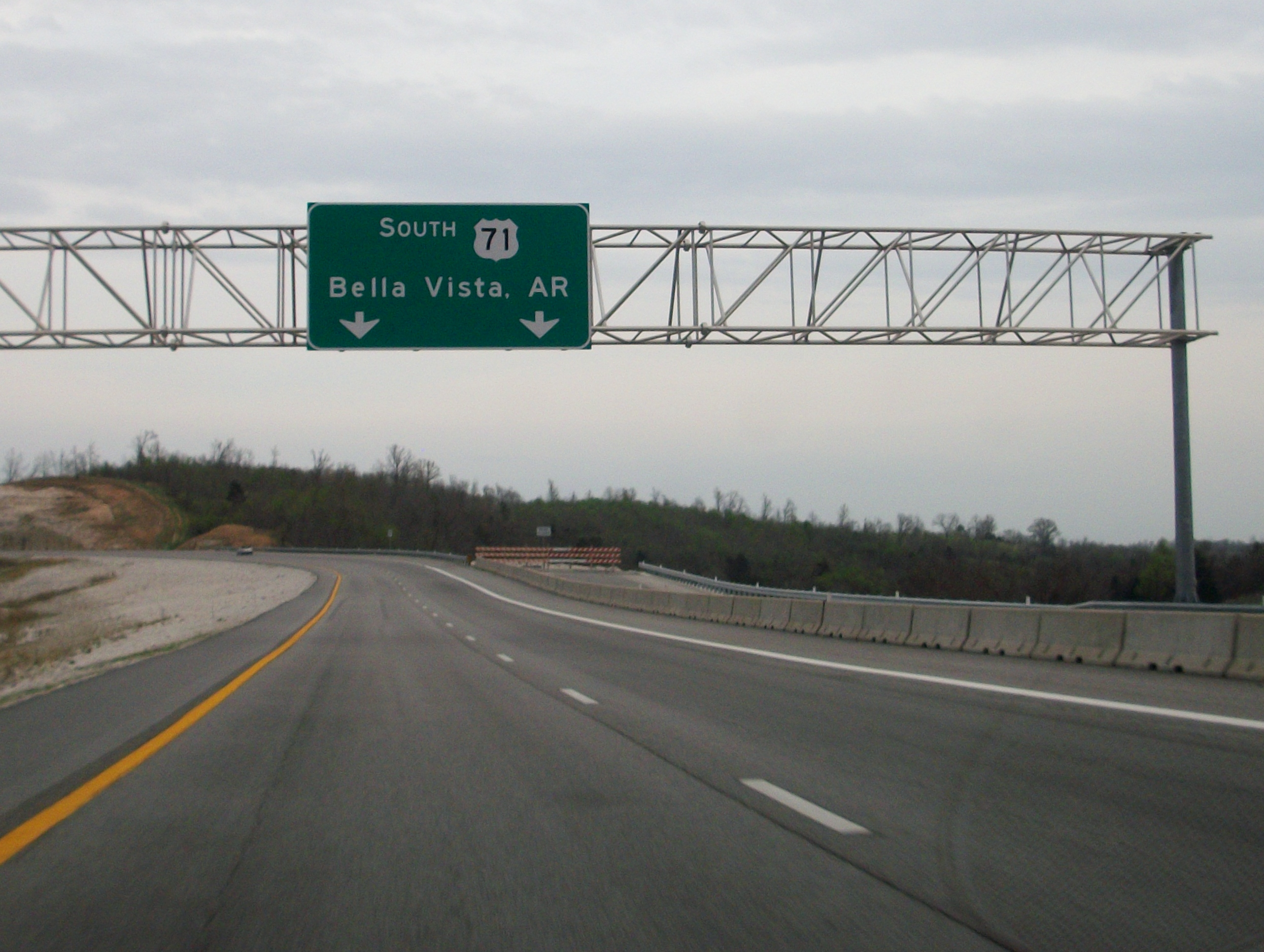
Former southern terminus of I-49 as seen in 2011, near Pineville, Missouri; a connection from this point to CR 34 west of Bella Vista, Arkansas, opened in 2021.

Arkansas and Missouri pursued an I-49 designation for US 71 and I-540 for a number of years. In the early 2000s, there were plans by both states to renumber the roadway as such between I-44 west of Joplin and I-40 at Fort Smith once new roadway had been completed around Bella Vista, Arkansas, and north to Pineville, Missouri. However, the American Association of State Highway and Transportation Officials (AASHTO) Special Committee on U.S. Route Numbering denied the I-49 designation at their annual meeting in September 2007 because none of the new roadway was under construction.

The Missouri Department of Transportation (MoDOT) announced the Joplin-to-Kansas City upgrade of US 71 in August 2010, to be done with the intention of bringing the I-49 designation to Missouri. The I-49 upgrade involved removing all at-grade intersections and constructing interchanges and overpasses at 15 sites between Harrisonville and Lamar. The two-year project represented a shift in funding priorities for MoDOT, which, in 2007, had announced the indefinite postponement of its portion of the Bella Vista bypass project, citing a $139 million (equivalent to $202 million in 2024) funding gap in Arkansas between construction costs and toll revenues, and Arkansas's commitment to only a two-lane bypass constructed over six years.

MoDOT began installing I-49 trailblazer signage (without shields) as well as gantry signs and milemarkers, about 1200 signs in all, in February 2012. I-49 signage shields were covered or turned from view until the I-49 designation was given final approval by the Federal Highway Administration (FHWA). This includes milemarkers at 0.2-mile (0.32 km) intervals along the entire alignment apart from I-44.

The I-49 designation in Missouri became official at noon on December 12, 2012. The designation applies to 180 miles (290 km) of current US 71 between Bannister Road (Route W) in south Kansas City and Route H at Pineville (McDonald County) which was upgraded to Interstate standards beginning in 2010. The last of the upgrade projects were completed in December 2012, but some designations about seven miles (11 km) north of the Arkansas state line still have not been built to meet Interstate standards.

In 2012, Missouri had $40 million (equivalent to $53.9 million in 2024) available for its portion of the Bella Vista bypass but moved the money elsewhere in 2013. They planned on using money from a proposed constitutional amendment which would have raised the sales tax; however, this was defeated by voters in August 2014. Arkansas announced it will not extend its section to Missouri until construction begins on the Missouri section.

In March 2019, the Missouri Highways and Transportation Commission approved the remaining funding needed to complete the portion of the Bella Vista Bypass within the state. On April 1, 2020, the Missouri Highways and Transportation Commission awarded a $58.7 million contract for the construction of the five-mile (8.0 km) portion of highway. Construction started on May 11, 2020, and the entire bypass opened on October 1, 2021, following a ribbon-cutting ceremony held the day prior.

== Exit list ==
County	Location	mi	km	Exit	Destinations	Notes
McDonald		0.000	0.000		I-49 south – Fort Smith	Continuation into Arkansas
McDonald		2.166	3.486	2	Route 90 – Noel, Jane	
McDonald		4.798– 4.989	7.722– 8.029	4	US 71 south – Bella Vista	Southbound exit and northbound entrance; southern end of US 71 overlap
McDonald	Pineville	5.987	9.635	5	Route H – Pineville, Noel	
McDonald		7.821	12.587	7	Route EE – Pineville, Lanagan	
McDonald		10.953	17.627	10	Route 76 – Anderson	
McDonald	Goodman	16.033	25.803	16	US 71 Bus. south / Route 59 – Goodman, Anderson	Southbound exit and northbound entrance
McDonald		17.217	27.708	17	Route B / Route BB – Goodman	
Newton		20.749	33.392	20	I-49 BL north / Route AA	
Newton	Neosho	24.305	39.115	24	US 60 – Seneca, Neosho	
Newton	Neosho	27.321	43.969	27	I-49 BL south / Route 86 – Racine, Neosho	
Newton		30.315	48.787	30	Iris Road	
Newton	Tipton Ford	33.322	53.627	33	I-49 BL north / Route 175 (Gateway Drive)	
Newton		35.343	56.879	35	Route V – Diamond	
Newton–Jasper county line		39.352	63.331	39A	Route FF (32nd Street)	Signed as exit 39 southbound
Jasper		39.501	63.571	39 (NB); 11 (SB)	I-44 west / Route 249 north to Route 66 – Joplin, Tulsa	Southern end of I-44 overlap; signed as exits 39B (north) and 39C (west) northbound
Jasper		41.090	66.128	13	Prigmor Avenue – Joplin	Opened November 2015
Jasper		43.325	69.725	15	I-44 BL west / Route 66 – Duenweg, Joplin	Southbound exit and northbound entrance
Jasper	Fidelity	46.318	74.542	18 (NB); 46 (SB)	I-44 east / Route 59 south – Springfield, Diamond	Northern end of I-44 overlap; signed as exits 18A (south) and 18B (east) northbound, exits 46A (south) and 46B (east) southbound
Jasper	Fidelity	47.650	76.685	47	Cedar Road	
Jasper	Carthage	50.151	80.710	49	Route 571 north (Garrison Avenue)	Northbound exit and southbound entrance
Jasper	Carthage	50.946	81.990	50	Route HH (Fir Road) – Carterville	Roundabout Diamond Interchange opened Oct 15th, 2024
Jasper	Carthage	52.071	83.800	51	Fairview Avenue	
Jasper	Carthage	53.775	86.542	53	I-49 BL south / Route 96 / Route 171 north / Route 571 south (Central Avenue) – Webb City	
Jasper	Carthage	55.844	89.872	55	Civil War Road	
Jasper		56.920	91.604	56	Route V (Garrison Avenue) / Route D – Alba	Southbound exit and northbound entrance
Jasper		63.314	101.894	63	Route M / Route N	
Jasper	Jasper	66.516	107.047	66	Route H / Route K – Jasper	
Barton		70.689	113.763	70	Route 126 – Pittsburg, Golden City	
Barton		74.702	120.221	74	30th Road	Opened November 2013
Barton	Lamar	77.271	124.356	77	US 160 – Mindenmines, Lamar	
Barton		80.803	130.040	80	Route DD / Route EE	
Barton		83.819	134.894	83	Route V / Route C – Irwin	
Vernon		89.042	143.299	88	Route N / Route B – Bronaugh, Sheldon	
Vernon		92.065	148.164	91	Route BB / Route DD – Bellamy	
Vernon		96.050	154.577	95	Route E – Milo	
Vernon	Nevada	101.386	163.165	101	I-49 BL north / Route K to US 54 west – Nevada, Camp Clark	
Vernon	Nevada	102.483	164.930	102A	US 54 – Nevada, El Dorado Springs	Signed as exit 102 northbound
Vernon	Nevada	103.131	165.973	102B	I-49 BL south – Nevada	Southbound exit and northbound entrance
Vernon	Nevada	103.787	167.029	103	Highland Avenue	
Vernon		107.263	172.623	107	Route M – Compton Junction	
Vernon		110.595	177.985	110	Route D – Stotesbury	
Vernon		112.351	180.811	112	Horton	
Vernon		116.570	187.601	116	Route TT	
Bates	Rich Hill	120.974	194.689	120	Route A / Route B – Rich Hill, Osceola	
Bates		129.539	208.473	129	Route 52 east – Appleton City	Southern end of Route 52 overlap
Bates		130.795	210.494	130	I-49 BL north / Route 52 west – Butler	Northbound exit and southbound entrance
Bates	Butler	132.153	212.680	131	Route 52 – Butler, Amoret	Northern end of Route 52 overlap
Bates		136.849	220.237	136	I-49 BL south / Route F / Route D – Passaic, Butler	
Bates	Adrian	141.896	228.359	141	Route 18 – Adrian, Clinton	
Bates		144.417	232.417	144	Route AA / Route E	
Cass	Archie	147.789	237.843	147	Route A / Route B – Archie, Drexel	
Cass	Harrisonville	153.470	246.986	153	307th Street	
Cass	Harrisonville	157.455	253.399	157	Route 7 south – Clinton	Southern end of Route 7 overlap;DDI opened Mid-April of 2024
Cass	Harrisonville	158.862	255.664	158	Route 2 east (Commercial Street)	Southern end of Route 2 overlap
Cass	Harrisonville	160.187	257.796	159	Route 2 west / Route 7 north (Mechanic Street)	Northern end of Route 2 / Route 7 overlap
Cass	Harrisonville	160.731	258.671	160	Route 291 north – Lee's Summit, Harrisonville	Opened in 2016; existing diamond interchange converted to a diverging diamond interchange
Cass	Peculiar	167.484	269.539	167	Route C / Route J – Peculiar	
Cass	Peculiar	168.905	271.826	168	211th Street / Peculiar Way	Diverging diamond interchange opened September 13, 2016
Cass	Raymore	172.475	277.572	172	North Cass Parkway	
Cass	Belton	174.426	280.711	174	Route 58 – Belton, Raymore	
Cass	Belton	175.658	282.694	175	Route Y / 163rd Street	
Cass–Jackson county line	Belton–Grandview– Kansas City tripoint	177.055	284.942	176	155th Street – Belton	Opened on December 15, 2017
Jackson	Grandview–Kansas City line	178.043	286.532	177	Route 150	Current interchange converted from the existing diamond interchange
Jackson	Grandview	178.920	287.944	178	140th Street	
Jackson	Grandview	180.186	289.981	179	Main Street	This bridge was replaced and opened on November 22, 2017
Jackson	Grandview	180.747	290.884	180	Truman Drive	No direct northbound exit
Jackson	Grandview–Kansas City line	181.524	292.135	181	Blue Ridge Boulevard / Hickman Mills Drive / Longview Road	
Jackson	Kansas City	182.673	293.984	182	Red Bridge Road / Longview Road	
Jackson	Kansas City	183.298– 183.981	294.990– 296.089	183	I-435 / I-470 east / US 50 to I-70 west – Wichita, Lee's Summit, Des Moines, Downtown Kansas City	Signed as exits 183B (north) and 183A (east/west) [exit numbers not signed]; I-435 exit 71; western terminus and exit 1A on I-470
Jackson	Kansas City	183.298– 183.981	294.990– 296.089	—	US 71 north – Downtown Kansas City	[exit number not signed] Continuation north; northern end of US 71 overlap
1.000 mi = 1.609 km; 1.000 km = 0.621 mi: Concurrency terminus; Incomplete access

Interstate 49
Previous state: Arkansas	Missouri	Next state: Terminus
