= K-171 (Kansas highway) =

State highway in Kansas, U.S.

K-171
- K-171 highlighted in red

Route information
- Maintained by KDOT
- Length: 4.890 mi (7.870 km)
- Existed: May 14, 2003–present

Major junctions
- West end: US-69 / US-160 / US-400 south of Pittsburg
- East end: Route 171 at the Missouri state line in Opolis

Location
- Country: United States
- State: Kansas
- Counties: Cherokee, Crawford

Highway system
- Kansas State Highway System; Interstate; US; State; Spurs
← K-170	→ K-173

K-171 is a state highway in the southeastern part of the U.S. state of Kansas. The 4.890-mile (7.870 km) highway mostly lies on the Crawford County/Cherokee County line except for the easternmost 0.4 miles (0.64 km) of the highway when it is entirely in Cherokee County. Its western terminus is at the intersection of U.S. Route 69 (US-69), US-160 and US-400 south of Pittsburg and its eastern terminus is a continuation as Missouri Route 171 at the Missouri state line near Opolis. K-171's current route was established on May 14, 2003, and the routing has not changed since.

== Route description ==
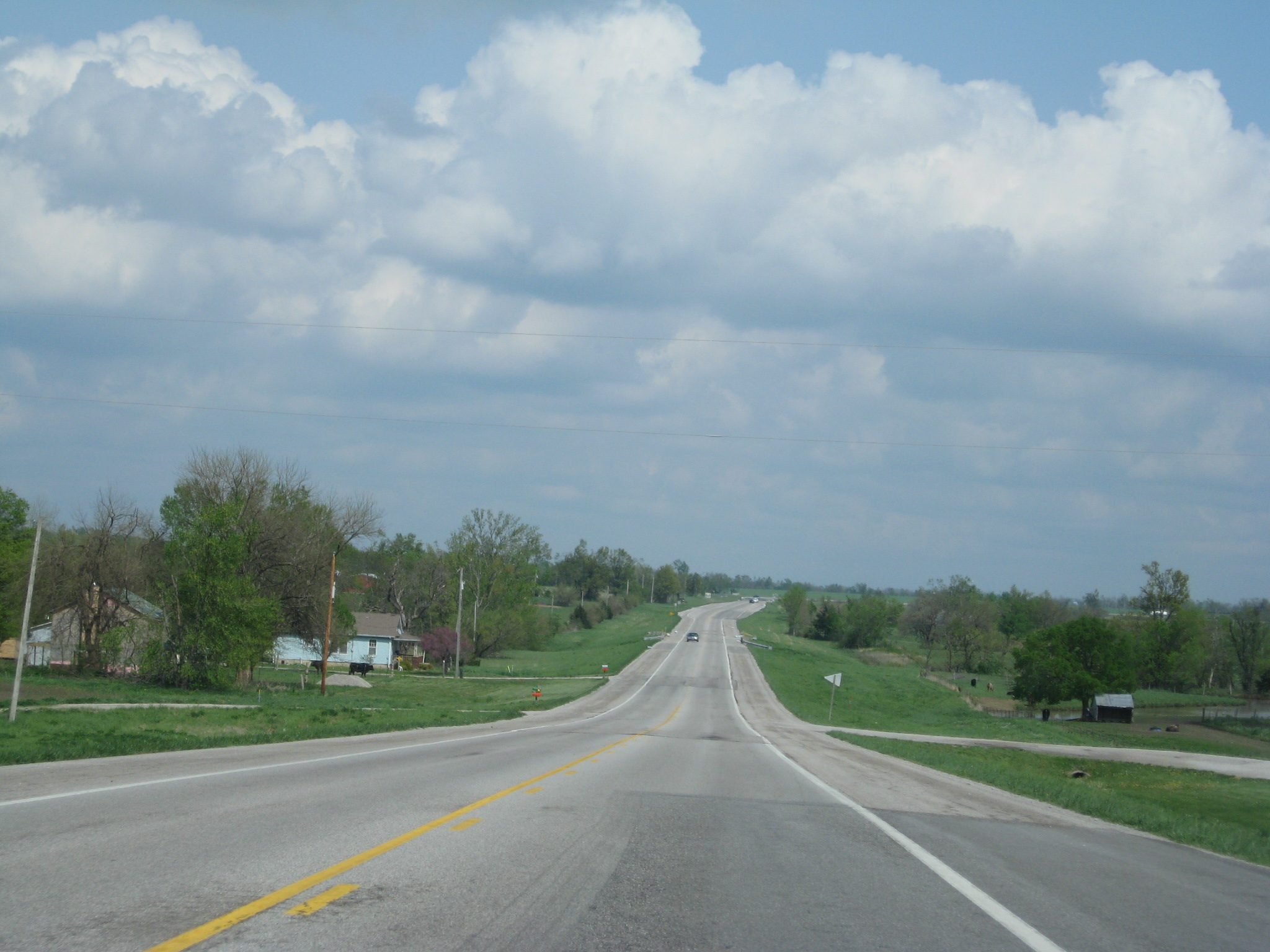
K-171, near the highway's midpoint

K-171 begins at a four-way stop south of Pittsburg. The west arm of this intersection serves as US-400, the north arm carries US-69 and US-160, the south arm is US-69, US-160, and US-400, and the east arm forms the beginning of K-171. From this intersection, the highway heads due east to Opolis. The highway begins to curve to the south just before crossing the state line and becoming Route 171 at the Missouri border. The entire route travels through mostly rural fields. The total length of the route is 4.89 miles (7.87 km).

The Kansas Department of Transportation (KDOT) tracks the traffic levels on its highways, and in 2019, they determined that on average the traffic varied from 7,180 vehicles per day near the western terminus to 7,650 vehicles per day near the eastern terminus. The entire length of K-171 is included in the National Highway System. The National Highway System is a system of highways important to the nation's defense, economy, and mobility. The first four miles (6.4 km) of the route is paved with composite pavement, while the remaining 0.89 miles (1.43 km) is paved with full design bituminous pavement.

== History ==
In a May 14, 2003 resolution, it was approved to truncate K-57 to end at US-169 by Colony. At this time K-171 was established along the former section of K-57 between US-69 and the Missouri border. The highway's route has stayed the same since it was commissioned. For several years there was a western K-171 from the city of Bushton to K-4. This western K-171 was decommissioned in 2010.

== Major intersections ==
County	Location	mi	km	Destinations	Notes
Cherokee–Crawford county line		0.000	0.000	US-69 / US-160 / US-400 – Cherokee, Columbus, Pittsburg	Western terminus; mainline continues west as US-400
Cherokee	Opolis	4.890	7.870	Route 171 – Joplin	Eastern terminus; Missouri state line
1.000 mi = 1.609 km; 1.000 km = 0.621 mi
