= List of Interstate Highways in Missouri =

Interstate Highways of the Missouri Highway System
- Highway markers Interstate 44, Interstate 435, and Interstate Business Loop 55
- Interstate Highways highlighted in red

System information
- Maintained by MoDOT
- Formed: June 29, 1956

Highway names
- Interstates: Interstate nn (I‑nn)

System links
- Missouri State Highway System; Interstate; US; State; Supplemental

The Interstate Highways in Missouri are the segments of the national Dwight D. Eisenhower System of Interstate and Defense Highways that are owned and maintained by the U.S. state of Missouri.

== Primary Interstates ==
Number	Length (mi)	Length (km)	Southern or western terminus	Northern or eastern terminus	Formed	Removed	Notes
I-29	128.584	206.936	Downtown Loop in Kansas City, Missouri	I‑29 at Iowa state line south of Hamburg, IA	1963	current	
I-35	114.448	184.186	I‑35 at Kansas City, Missouri	I‑35 north of Eagleville	1972	current	
I-44	293.184	471.834	I‑44 west of Joplin	I‑70 in St. Louis	1956	current	
I-49	178.717	287.617	I-49 south of Pineville	I‑470 in Kansas City	2012	current	Extended into Arkansas
I-55	210.45	338.69	I‑55 south of Steele	I‑55/I‑64 at St. Louis	1956	current	
I-57	22.056	35.496	I‑55 at Sikeston	I-57 north of Charleston	—	—	Will be extended into Arkansas
I-64	40.816	65.687	I‑70 at Wentzville	I‑64 at St. Louis	1956	current	
I-66	340	550	Kansas state line west of Joplin	Kentucky state line south of Cairo, IL	1991	2015	Proposed as part of the East–West TransAmerica Corridor in 1991
I-70	250.063	402.437	I‑70 at Kansas City	I‑70 at St. Louis	1956	current	
I-72	2.056	3.309	US 36/US 61 in Hannibal	I-72 at Hannibal	—	—	A 157-mile (253 km) extension has been proposed to Cameron
Former

== Auxiliary Interstates ==
Number	Length (mi)	Length (km)	Southern or western terminus	Northern or eastern terminus	Formed	Removed	Notes
I-144	15.4	24.8	I‑70 in Bridgeton	Missouri/Illinois state line	—	—	Proposal for what would become I-244.
I-155	10.834	17.436	I‑55/US 61 east of Hayti	I‑155 east of Caruthersville	—	—	
I-170	11.255	18.113	I‑64/US 40 in Richmond Heights	I‑270 in Hazelwood	—	—	
I-229	15.022	24.176	I‑29/US 71 in St. Joseph	I‑29/US 59/US 71 north of St. Joseph	1986	current	
I-244	21.047	33.872	I‑55 south of Green Park	I‑70 in Bridgeton	—	—	Previous designation for part of I-270
I-255	3.979	6.404	I‑55 south of Green Park	I‑255/US 50 at Illinois state line south of St. Louis	—	—	Missouri section of the eastern half of beltway around St. Louis
I-270	35.497	57.127	I‑55 south of Green Park	I‑270 at Illinois state line at St. Louis	—	—	Western half of beltway around St. Louis
I-435	55.184	88.810	I‑435 at Kansas City	I‑435 Kansas state line at Parkville	—	—	Missouri section of the beltway around Kansas City
I-470	17.081	27.489	I‑435/US 50/US 71 in Kansas City	I‑70 in Independence	1970	current	
I-635	3.766	6.061	I‑635 at Kansas City	I‑29/US 71 in Kansas City	—	—	
I-670	2.323	3.739	I‑670 at Kansas City	I‑70/US 40 in Kansas City	—	—	
I-755	4	6.4	—	—	—	—	Cancelled proposed state highway/Interstate
Former

== Business routes ==
Number	Length (mi)	Length (km)	Southern or western terminus	Northern or eastern terminus	Formed	Removed	Notes
I-29 BL	14.063	22.632	I-29 / US 169 in St. Joseph	I-29 / US 59 / US Bus. 71 in Jefferson Township	—	—	
I-35 BL	3.235	5.206	I-35 / Route BB in Cameron	I-35 / US 36 / MO 110 in Cameron	—	—	
I-44 BL	11.529	18.554	I-44 / MO 43 / MO 86 in Joplin	I-44 / MO 66 in Scotland	—	—	Serves Joplin
I-44 BL	4.333	6.973	I-44 / MO 37 in Sarcoxie	I-44 / Old US 166 in Sarcoxie	—	—	
I-44 BL	2.736	4.403	I-44 / Route H in Mount Vernon	I-44 / MO 39 in Mount Vernon	—	—	
I-44 BL	9.657	15.541	I-44 / MO 266 in Springfield	I-44 / Route H in Springfield	—	—	
I-44 BL	3.668	5.903	I-44 / Old US 66 in Lebanon	I-44 / Route MM in Lebanon	—	—	
I-44 BL	6.014	9.679	I-44 / Route H in Waynesville	I-44 / Route Y in St. Robert	—	—	
I-44 BS	2.213	3.561	I-44 / Route Y and Route Z in St. Robert	Fort Leonard Wood	—	—	
I-44 BL	2.449	3.941	I-44 / Old US 66 in Rolla	I-44 / US 63 / Old US 66 in Rolla	—	—	
I-44 BL	9.026	14.526	I-44 / MO 100 / Old US 66 (1926-1933) in Pacific	I-44 / Old US 66 (1933-1985) in Pacific	1979	current	
I-49 BL	9.740	15.675	I-49 / Route AA in Neosho	I-49 / MO 86 in Neosho	2012	current	
I-49 BL	22.546	36.284	I-49 / MO 175 in Tipton Ford	I-49 / MO 96 / MO 171 / MO 571 in Carthage	2012	current	Serves Joplin
I-49 BL	2.927	4.711	I-49 / Route K in Nevada	I-49 / US Bus 71 in Nevada	2012	current	Replaces US Bus. 71
I-49 BL	6.109	9.831	I-49 / MO 52 in Butler	I-49 / Route F / Route D in Butler	2012	current	Former segment of US 71
I-55 BL	5.751	9.255	I-55 / US 61 / US 62 in New Madrid	I-55 / US 61 / US 62 in New Madrid	—	—	
I-55 BL	15.705	25.275	I-55 / US 61 / MO 74 in Cape Girardeau	I-55 / US 61 in Fruitland	—	—	
I-55 BL	5.015	8.071	I-55 / US 67 / US 61 in Crystal City	I-55 / McNutt Street in Herculaneum	—	—	
I-57 BL	2.94	4.73	I-57 / US 60 / MO 105 in Charleston	I-57 / US 62 / MO 77 in Charleston	—	—	
I-70 BL	6.665	10.726	I-70 / US 40 / MO 5 in Boonville	I-70 / MO 87 in Boonville	—	—	
I-70 BL	2.878	4.632	I-70 / US 40 in Columbia	I-70 / US 40 in Columbia	—	—	
I-70 BL	2.831	4.556	I-70 / MO 94 in St. Charles	I-70 in St. Charles	—	—	
