= Business routes of Interstate 49 =

Interstate 49 Business

Location
- Country: United States

Highway system
- Interstate Highway System; Main; Auxiliary; Suffixed; Business; Future

Four business routes of Interstate 49 (I-49) exist, all of them within the state of Missouri. All four were once business routes of U.S. Route 71 (US 71) and were converted to business routes of I-49 on December 12, 2012, when that highway was designated in Missouri.

== Neosho business loop ==
Interstate 49 Business
- Location: Neosho, Missouri
- Existed: December 12, 2012–present

Interstate 49 Business (I-49 Bus.) is a business route of I-49. It begins two miles (3.2 km) northwest of Neosho, Missouri, at I-49/US 71 and Route 86 and ends south of the city at I-49/US 71 and Route AA. Part of the highway overlaps Route 86; another part overlaps Route 59. Most of the road is a previous alignment of US 71, which was realigned west of Neosho as a freeway and was eventually upgraded to I-49.

I-49 Bus. in Neosho used to be labeled U.S. Route 71 Business (US 71 Bus.), with its northern terminus instead following present-day Route 175 until the interchange with I-49/US 71 and the southern terminus of I-49 Bus. in Joplin (former US 71 Bus. in Joplin).

== Joplin business loop ==
Interstate 49 Business
- Location: Joplin, Missouri
- Existed: December 12, 2012–present

Interstate 49 Business (I-49 Bus.) is an alternate alignment of I-49/US 71 which begins at a junction of I-49/US 71 and Route 175 at Tipton Ford, Missouri, midway between Joplin and Neosho. Its northern terminus is at the junction of I-49, US 71, Route 96, Route 171, and Route 571 in Carthage.

This particular section of I-49 Bus. is a relatively long one and begins its existence as a nonfreeway divided highway at I-49/US 71, heading north until it meets I-44. Its interchange with I-44 was reconstructed from a cloverleaf design to a diverging diamond interchange, opening on July 19, 2013; the grading for the cloverleaf is still visible. It then enters Joplin, where it is a major boulevard known as Range Line Road, a main throughfare throughout Joplin. At Webb City, I-44 Bus. eventually becomes a freeway, finally ending in Carthage at I-44/US 71.

The road was an earlier alignment of US 71 until the newer freeway that eventually became I-49 was built to carry the road to the east of Joplin. At one point, Route 175 had been labeled US 71 Bus., and the road continued south as US 71 Bus. in Neosho.

Cities on I-49 Bus. (Joplin):

- Carthage, Missouri
- Carterville, Missouri
- Webb City, Missouri
- Joplin, Missouri
- Silver Creek, Missouri
- Leawood, Missouri
- Saginaw, Missouri
- Tipton Ford, Missouri

== Nevada business loop ==
Interstate 49 Business
- Location: Nevada, Missouri
- Existed: December 12, 2012–present

Interstate 49 Business (I-49 Bus.) is a business route of I-49 in Nevada, Missouri. It begins at I-49/US 71 in the east-central part of the city and ends at the same highway on the northside of town. This is one of the shortest alignments of the many US 71 business routes throughout western Missouri.

I-49 Bus. is a former alignment of US 71 through town. It begins at an interchange between I-49/US 71 and Austin Boulevard. I-49 Bus. follows Austin Boulevard east to Centennial Boulevard, where it meets US 54. US 54, together with I-49 Bus., continues west along Austin Boulevard to Osage Boulevard, where I-49 Bus. turns north. I-49 Bus. follows Osage Boulevard until meeting again with I-49/US 71.

== Butler business loop ==
Interstate 49 Business
- Location: Butler, Missouri
- Existed: December 12, 2012–present

Interstate 49 Business (I-49 Bus.) is a route in Butler, Missouri. It begins at I-49/US 71 near Passaic and ends at the same highway south of Butler.

I-49 Bus. is a former alignment of US 71 through town.
