= Missouri Route 171 =

State highway in Missouri, U.S.

Route 171
- MO 171 highlighted in red

Route information
- Maintained by MoDOT
- Length: 25.931 mi (41.732 km)

Major junctions
- East end: I-49 / US 71 / Route 571 in Carthage
- Route 249 in Carterville; I-49 BL in Webb City; Route 96 north of Carl Junction
- North end: K-171 at the Kansas state line in Opolis, KS

Location
- Country: United States
- State: Missouri
- County: Jasper

Highway system
- Missouri State Highway System; Interstate; US; State; Supplemental
← I-170	→ Route 172
← I-57	Route 57	→ Route 58

Route 171 is a short highway in southwestern Missouri. It runs from Interstate 49 (I-49) in Carthage northwest to the Kansas state line. The first ten miles are concurrent with I-49 BL.

== Route description ==
Some (about half) of those last 10 miles (16 km) to Carthage, from its junction with I-49 Business at Madison Ave. in Webb City, are routed in a northeasterly direction. This results in going northeast on southbound Route 171 and vice versa along this stretch. However, I-49 Business is going more or less in its designated direction, north, in a wrong-way concurrency at the same time.

Also, because of this curve back to the northeast, Route 171 and Route 96 intersect each other on opposite sides of the Joplin/Webb City area. Going "southbound," Route 96 and Route 171 meet each other about two miles (3 km) north of Carl Junction and then again about two miles (3 km) west of Carthage. Route 96 maintains a straight east–west routing between these two points except at the very east end before the intersection with Route 171 and I-49 Business.

At Carthage, Route 171 meets its "parent" route, US 71, along with I-49. Route 171's "southern" terminus and I-49 Business' northern terminus are here while the northern terminus of Route 571 approaches from the east. Route 96 continues through this interchange. This results in three x71's meeting in the same location.

== History ==
Route 57
- Location: Jasper County
- Length: 10.4 mi (16.7 km)
- Existed: 1922–1959

Route 171 was once Route 57. That was changed when I-57 was established on the eastern side of the state. Kansas did not change K-57's number to match until 2004, when it became K-171 after it was decided to shorten K-57 because it had numerous concurrencies along its routing.

== Major intersections ==
The entire route is in Jasper County.

Location	mi	km	Destinations	Notes
Carthage	0.000	0.000	Route 96 east / Route 571 south – Carthage I-49 BL begins	Continuation east; southern end of Route 96 concurrency; northern terminus of I-49 BL
Carthage	0.000	0.000	I-49 / US 71 – Kansas City, Joplin	Exit 53 on I-49
	1.670	2.688	Route 96 west – Oronogo	Northern end of Route 96 concurrency
Brooklyn Heights	3.534	5.687	Access via Historic US 66	
Carterville	6.195	9.970	Route HH – Carterville	
Carterville	6.673	10.739	Route 249 south to I-44 / I-49 (US 71) – Joplin	Northern terminus of Route 249
Webb City			Northern end of freeway section	
Webb City	8.810	14.178	I-49 BL south (Madison Avenue) – Joplin, Missouri Southern State University	Northern end of I-49 BL concurrency
Webb City	9.465	15.232	Historic US 66 east (Powell Drive)	Southern end of Historic US 66 concurrency
Airport Drive	10.808	17.394	Route 43 / Historic US 66 west (North Main Street Road) – Joplin, Joplin Regional Airport Main Terminal	Roundabout; northern end of Historic US 66 concurrency
	16.027	25.793	Route 96 east / Route YY west – Kansas, Carthage	Western terminus of Route 96; eastern terminus of Route YY
	25.931	41.732	K-171 west – Pittsburg	Continuation into Kansas
1.000 mi = 1.609 km; 1.000 km = 0.621 mi: Concurrency terminus
