= John's Modern Cabins =

- Interactive map of the John's Modern Cabins area

General information
- Location: Newburg, Missouri, Sugartree Outer Road; U.S. Route 66
- Coordinates: 37.9375431°N 91.9444127°W
- Opening: 1931
- Closed: c. 1967
- Owner: John and Lillian Dausch

Design and construction
- Developer: Beatrice and Bill Bayliss

Other information
- Number of rooms: 6 (later 8)
- Number of restaurants: 1 (demolished 1957)
- Parking: on-site

John's Modern Cabins are an abandoned ghost tourist court on U.S. Route 66 in Newburg, Missouri. Structurally unsound and at risk of being demolished or simply collapsing for many years, their name is now an unwitting example of irony in the English language.

== History ==
In 1931, Beatrice and Bill Bayliss opened Bill and Bess's Place, a tourist court with a dance hall and six log cabins on U.S. Route 66 in Missouri serving travellers on the main road of the day. In the depression era, cabins and campgrounds were popular low-cost alternatives to expensive hotels.

They sold the property a decade later; at this point there would be "all kinds of cabins" in the region, much needed to house personnel around Fort Leonard Wood as the US mobilised to join World War II. The site changed hands multiple times, being acquired by John and Lillian Dausch in 1951 for $5,000. John Dausch would soon acquire the nickname "Sunday John" for selling beer seven days a week in open defiance of the local laws of the era.

Widening of U.S. Route 66 in 1957 required the property be moved back from the original road; the dance hall was removed at this point. The nearby Vernelle's Motel also lost its restaurant and filling station when US 66 was widened. By 1965, the state was constructing Interstate 44 in the region. Some of the land from the John's Modern Cabins site was lost to freeway construction, but the new highway would not provide easy access to the cabin court and would prove fatal to the tiny business.

John Dausch closed the business upon his wife Lillian's death, not long after the new road had bypassed the site. His own death in 1971 would leave the property vacant and unmaintained; Loretta Ross of St. Charles, Missouri purchased the site in 1976 but that family's plans for the site were soon abandoned. The property was left untouched and decaying for the next 25 years. A proposal by the Ross family to demolish the now-unstable structures was successfully opposed by Route 66 preservationists in 2002 after the issue was publicised in "Route 66 Magazine" and on-line but no attempt has been made to prevent the further deterioration of the buildings. Mock Burma-Shave signs at the site once advised visitors to "photograph these / while you're here / the wrecking ball / is looming near".

Unmaintained since 1971 and bypassed since the 1960s, the property is in dire condition and beyond repair. By 2011, the roof of John's larger living cabin had collapsed, along with 2 of the newer cabins he built. The site's outhouse, the matinence and the original cabins still stand. This segment of US 66 is usable but no longer maintained (the two-lane road is a dead end at a now-demolished bridge near the Arlington, Missouri ghost town). Interstate 44 has also been diverted away from its original 1967 path, now an abandoned pair of gravel roads, as part of a 2005 highway realignment. The site is therefore no longer visible from the freeway.

It is no longer safe to enter any of the buildings, although many have photographed the exteriors of the structures in the expectation that they may be lost completely in the near future due to years of abandonment and neglect.
