= Twin Groves Township, Jasper County, Missouri =

Township in Jasper County, Missouri, U.S.

Coordinates: 37.230°N 94.564°W

Twin Groves Township is an inactive township in Jasper County, in the U.S. state of Missouri.

Twin Groves Township took its name from the extinct town of Twin Groves which in turn was named for the fact there were two groves near the original town site.
