= Neosho Township, Newton County, Missouri =

Township in Newton County, Missouri, U.S.

Coordinates: 36.8978°N 94.3983°W

Neosho Township is an inactive township in Newton County, in the U.S. state of Missouri.

Neosho Township took its name from the community of Neosho, Missouri. The unincorporated community of Tipton Ford is also in the township.
