= Reeds, Missouri =

- Village
- Location of Reeds, Missouri
- Coordinates: 37°06′59″N 94°10′06″W
- Country: United States
- State: Missouri
- County: Jasper

Area
  - Total: 0.15 sq mi (0.40 km^{2})
  - Land: 0.15 sq mi (0.40 km^{2})
  - Water: 0 sq mi (0.00 km^{2})
- Elevation: 1,125 ft (343 m)

Population (2020)
  - Total: 91
  - Density: 595.4/sq mi (229.87/km^{2})
- Time zone: UTC-6 (Central (CST))
  - Summer (DST): UTC-5 (CDT)
- ZIP code: 64859
- Area code: 417
- FIPS code: 29-61094
- GNIS feature ID: 2396872

Reeds is a village in Jasper County, Missouri, United States. The population was 91 at the 2020 census. It is part of the Joplin, Missouri Metropolitan Statistical Area. For a short time, it was the county seat of Jasper County.

== History ==
Reeds was laid out in 1898, and named after W. T. Reed, the original owner of the town site. A post office called Reeds has been in operation since 1873.

== Geography ==
According to the United States Census Bureau, the city has a total area of 0.15 square miles (0.39 km^{2}), all land.

== Demographics ==
Historical population
| Census | Pop. | Note | %± |
|---|---|---|---|
| 1910 | 298 | | — |
| 1920 | 200 | | −32.9% |
| 1930 | 172 | | −14.0% |
| 1940 | 162 | | −5.8% |
| 1950 | 136 | | −16.0% |
| 1960 | 185 | | 36.0% |
| 1970 | 122 | | −34.1% |
| 1980 | 105 | | −13.9% |
| 1990 | 88 | | −16.2% |
| 2000 | 103 | | 17.0% |
| 2010 | 95 | | −7.8% |
| 2020 | 91 | | −4.2% |
U.S. Decennial Census

=== 2010 census ===
As of the census of 2010, there were 95 people, 35 households, and 25 families living in the city. The population density was 633.3 inhabitants per square mile (244.5/km^{2}). There were 40 housing units at an average density of 266.7 per square mile (103.0/km^{2}). The racial makeup of the city was 87.4% White, 3.2% African American, 3.2% Native American, 1.1% Asian, 1.1% from other races, and 4.2% from two or more races.

There were 35 households, of which 31.4% had children under the age of 18 living with them, 51.4% were married couples living together, 8.6% had a female householder with no husband present, 11.4% had a male householder with no wife present, and 28.6% were non-families. 28.6% of all households were made up of individuals, and 17.2% had someone living alone who was 65 years of age or older. The average household size was 2.71 and the average family size was 3.20.

The median age in the city was 41.5 years. 32.6% of residents were under the age of 18; 4.2% were between the ages of 18 and 24; 20.1% were from 25 to 44; 26.3% were from 45 to 64; and 16.8% were 65 years of age or older. The gender makeup of the city was 49.5% male and 50.5% female.

=== 2000 census ===
As of the census of 2000, there were 103 people, 39 households, and 31 families living in the town. The population density was 681.8 inhabitants per square mile (263.2/km^{2}). There were 44 housing units at an average density of 291.3 per square mile (112.5/km^{2}). The racial makeup of the town was 96.12% White, 0.97% African American, and 2.91% from two or more races. Hispanic or Latino of any race were 1.94% of the population.

There were 39 households, out of which 33.3% had children under the age of 18 living with them, 64.1% were married couples living together, 10.3% had a female householder with no husband present, and 20.5% were non-families. 20.5% of all households were made up of individuals, and 7.7% had someone living alone who was 65 years of age or older. The average household size was 2.64 and the average family size was 3.03.

In the town the population was spread out, with 26.2% under the age of 18, 7.8% from 18 to 24, 31.1% from 25 to 44, 25.2% from 45 to 64, and 9.7% who were 65 years of age or older. The median age was 35 years. For every 100 females, there were 80.7 males. For every 100 females age 18 and over, there were 100.0 males.

The median income for a household in the town was $25,625, and the median income for a family was $28,750. Males had a median income of $28,571 versus $23,750 for females. The per capita income for the town was $18,279. There were 13.8% of families and 11.6% of the population living below the poverty line, including no under eighteens and 18.2% of those over 64.

== Education ==
It is in the Sarcoxie R-II School District.
