= Miller, Missouri =

- City
- Location of Miller, Missouri
- Coordinates: 37°12′57″N 93°50′29″W
- Country: United States
- State: Missouri
- County: Lawrence

Area
  - Total: 0.77 sq mi (1.99 km^{2})
  - Land: 0.77 sq mi (1.99 km^{2})
  - Water: 0 sq mi (0.00 km^{2})
- Elevation: 1,302 ft (397 m)

Population (2020)
  - Total: 704
  - Density: 918.4/sq mi (354.58/km^{2})
- Time zone: UTC-6 (Central (CST))
  - Summer (DST): UTC-5 (CDT)
- ZIP code: 65707
- Area code: 417
- FIPS code: 29-48242
- GNIS feature ID: 0722367
- Website: www.cityofmillermo.org

Miller is a town in Lawrence County, Missouri, United States. As of the 2020 census, Miller had a population of 704.

== History ==
A post office called Miller has been in operation since 1891. The community has the name of T. A. Miller, a railroad contractor.

== Geography ==
Miller is located at 37°12′57″N 93°50′29″W (37.215885, -93.841499). According to the United States Census Bureau, the city has a total area of 0.76 square miles (1.97 km^{2}), all land. Miller is located on State Highway 39, north of State Highway 96 (Old U.S. Route 66).

== Demographics ==
Historical population
Census	Pop.	Note	%±
1900	148		—
1910	343		131.8%
1920	536		56.3%
1930	576		7.5%
1940	519		−9.9%
1950	615		18.5%
1960	601		−2.3%
1970	676		12.5%
1980	795		17.6%
1990	753		−5.3%
2000	754		0.1%
2010	699		−7.3%
2020	704		0.7%
U.S. Decennial Census

=== 2010 census ===
As of the census of 2010, there were 699 people, 290 households, and 173 families living in the city. The population density was 919.7 inhabitants per square mile (355.1/km^{2}). There were 363 housing units at an average density of 477.6 per square mile (184.4/km^{2}). The racial makeup of the city was 97.6% White, 0.3% African American, 0.3% Native American, 0.4% Asian, 0.9% from other races, and 0.6% from two or more races. Hispanic or Latino of any race were 2.9% of the population.

There were 290 households, of which 33.1% had children under the age of 18 living with them, 42.4% were married couples living together, 11.4% had a female householder with no husband present, 5.9% had a male householder with no wife present, and 40.3% were non-families. 33.8% of all households were made up of individuals, and 15.9% had someone living alone who was 65 years of age or older. The average household size was 2.41 and the average family size was 3.08.

The median age in the city was 36.6 years. 27.6% of residents were under the age of 18; 8.3% were between the ages of 18 and 24; 26.1% were from 25 to 44; 22.6% were from 45 to 64; and 15.5% were 65 years of age or older. The gender makeup of the city was 51.1% male and 48.9% female.

=== 2000 census ===
As of the census of 2000, there were 754 people, 323 households, and 207 families living in the city. The population density was 995.8 inhabitants per square mile (384.5/km^{2}). There were 378 housing units at an average density of 499.2 per square mile (192.7/km^{2}). The racial makeup of the city was 98.01% White, 0.13% African American, 0.27% Native American, 0.13% from other races, and 1.46% from two or more races. Hispanic or Latino of any race were 0.93% of the population.

There were 323 households, out of which 31.0% had children under the age of 18 living with them, 47.1% were married couples living together, 11.1% had a female householder with no husband present, and 35.9% were non-families. 34.1% of all households were made up of individuals, and 14.9% had someone living alone who was 65 years of age or older. The average household size was 2.33 and the average family size was 2.98.

In the city the population was spread out, with 27.1% under the age of 18, 7.6% from 18 to 24, 27.2% from 25 to 44, 21.2% from 45 to 64, and 17.0% who were 65 years of age or older. The median age was 36 years. For every 100 females, there were 98.4 males. For every 100 females age 18 and over, there were 92.3 males.

The median income for a household in the city was $24,722, and the median income for a family was $32,222. Males had a median income of $26,000 versus $17,768 for females. The per capita income for the city was $12,680. About 17.0% of families and 20.2% of the population were below the poverty line, including 28.8% of those under age 18 and 15.9% of those age 65 or over.

== Education ==
Miller R-II School District operates one elementary school and Miller High School.

Miller has a public library, a branch of the Barry-Lawrence Regional Library.

== Notable people ==
- Bobby Berk, Queer Eye interior design expert
- Dennis Franchione, college football coach
