= Tipton Ford, Missouri =

Unincorporated community in Missouri, U.S.

Tipton Ford
- Unincorporated community
- Location within the state of Missouri
- Coordinates: 36°58′36″N 94°25′34″W
- Country: United States
- State: Missouri
- County: Newton
- Township: Neosho
- Elevation: 945 ft (288 m)
- Time zone: UTC-6 (Central (CST))
  - Summer (DST): UTC-5 (CDT)
- Area code: 417

Tipton Ford is a small unincorporated community in Newton County, Missouri, United States, and located at the intersection of Interstate 49 and Route 175. The community is part of the Joplin, Missouri Metropolitan Statistical Area.

The community lies on the northeast bank of Shoal Creek and is 3.5 miles west-southwest of the George Washington Carver National Monument.

== History ==
A post office called Tipton Ford was established in 1890, and remained in operation until 1923. The community was named for a ford across Shoal Creek near the home of the Tipton family.

In August 1914, tragedy struck Tipton Ford, when a Missouri and North Arkansas Railroad locomotive collided with another train, a result of faulty communication. Thirty-eight passengers and five crew members were killed. From 1906 to 1946, the M&NA provided passenger and freight service from Joplin to Helena in eastern Arkansas.
