= U.S. Route 71 in Missouri =

Section of U.S. Highway in Missouri, United States

U.S. Route 71
- US 71 highlighted in red

Route information
- Maintained by MoDOT
- Length: 316.722 mi (509.715 km)

Major junctions
- South end: US 71 at the Arkansas state line near Bella Vista, AR
- I-49 from Pineville to Kansas City; I-44 / Route 249 in Joplin; I-435 / I-470 / US 50 in Kansas City; I-70 in Kansas City; I-29 / I-35 in Kansas City
- North end: US 71 at the Iowa state line in Braddyville, IA

Location
- Country: United States
- State: Missouri
- Counties: McDonald, Newton, Jasper, Barton, Vernon, Bates, Cass, Jackson, Clay, Platte, Buchanan, Andrew, Nodaway

Highway system
- United States Numbered Highway System; List; Special; Divided; Missouri State Highway System; Interstate; US; State; Supplemental
← I-70	→ Route 71

U.S. Route 71 (US 71) is a major north–south U.S. Highway that runs from a couple miles west of Krotz Springs, Louisiana to the Canada–United States border at International Falls, Minnesota. US 71 enters Missouri from Arkansas in the town of Jane. US 71 serves the cities of Joplin, Kansas City and St. Joseph. At noon on December 12, 2012, the section of US 71 between Pineville, Missouri and I-435 in south Kansas City was also designated as a northern extension of Interstate 49 (I-49).

== Route description ==
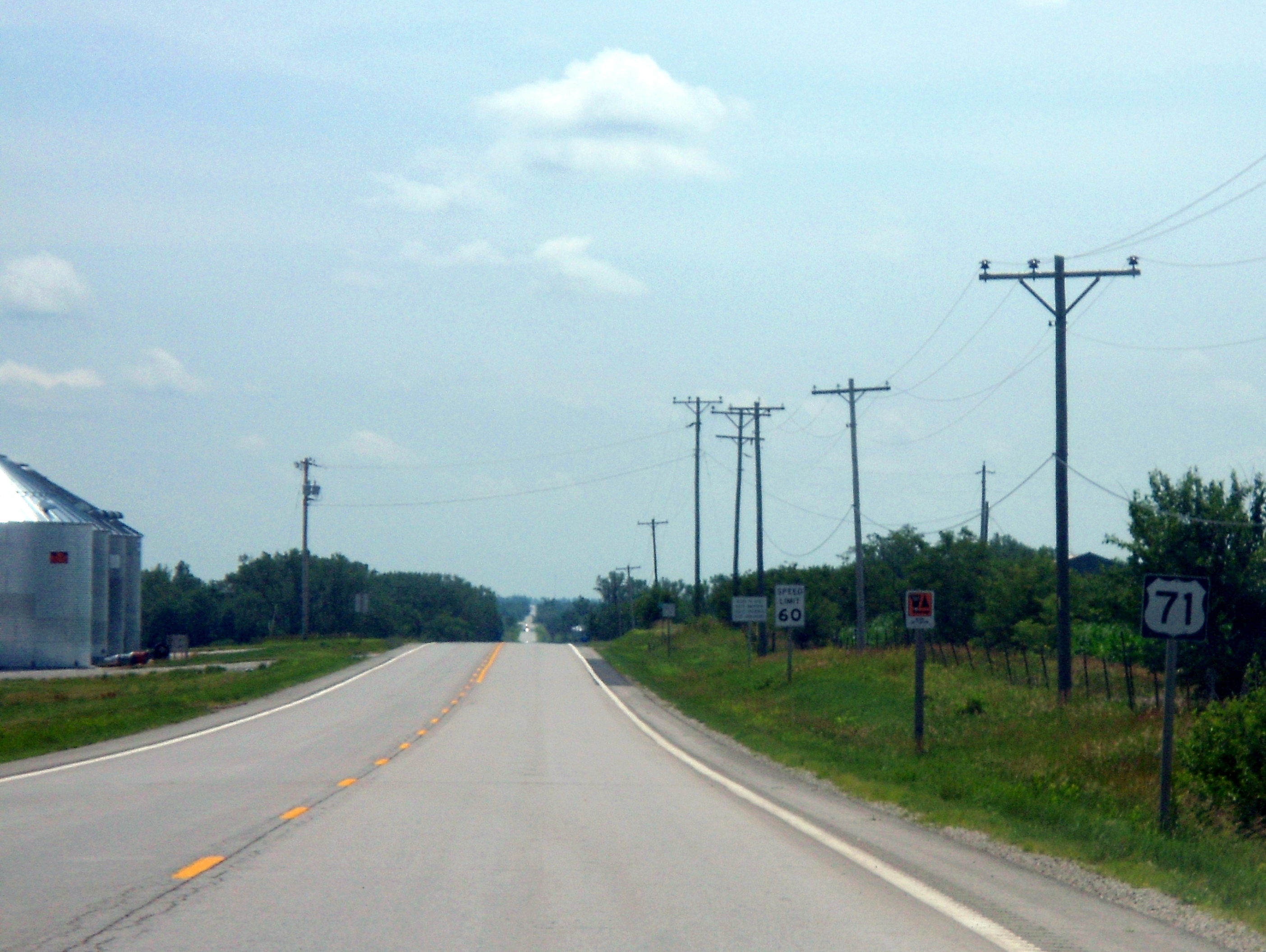
First reassurance marker on US 71 after entering Missouri from Iowa.

US 71 enters Missouri in Jane coming from Arkansas. The Bella Vista Bypass goes around Jane and Bella Vista, Arkansas to connect with the freeway section of US 71 near Pineville; it opened October 1, 2021. At this point, Interstate 49 begins its concurrency with US 71. I-49 and US 71 pass through many smaller communities before reaching Joplin. In Joplin, I-49 and US 71 interchange with Interstate 44 and begin a short concurrency from I-44 exits 11 through 18.

A few miles east of Joplin, I-49 and US 71 leave I-44, head north and enter Carthage. Due to the freeway being built, old sections of the highway have been bypassed and have become county roads. I-49 and US 71 pass through Nevada and other communities before reaching the Kansas City area. In south Kansas City, at Bannister Road just north of the Grandview Triangle, US 71 ends its concurrency with I-49, and continues into downtown Kansas City as Bruce R. Watkins Memorial Drive. US 71 loses its freeway status for 3 blocks in Kansas City before becoming a freeway again and entering Downtown Kansas City. It is very unlikely that the freeway will continue all the way through, as a court order prevents the stoplights to be bypassed, even though MoDOT has the necessary right of way to do so.

In northern Kansas City, US 71 shares many overlaps with interstates, including I-70, I-35, and I-29. US 71 runs with I-29 through Kansas City north of Downtown until St. Joseph.

Once in St. Joseph, US 71 leaves I-29. US 71 runs north to Maryville. US 71 serves the small community of Clearmont before running through countryside into Iowa.

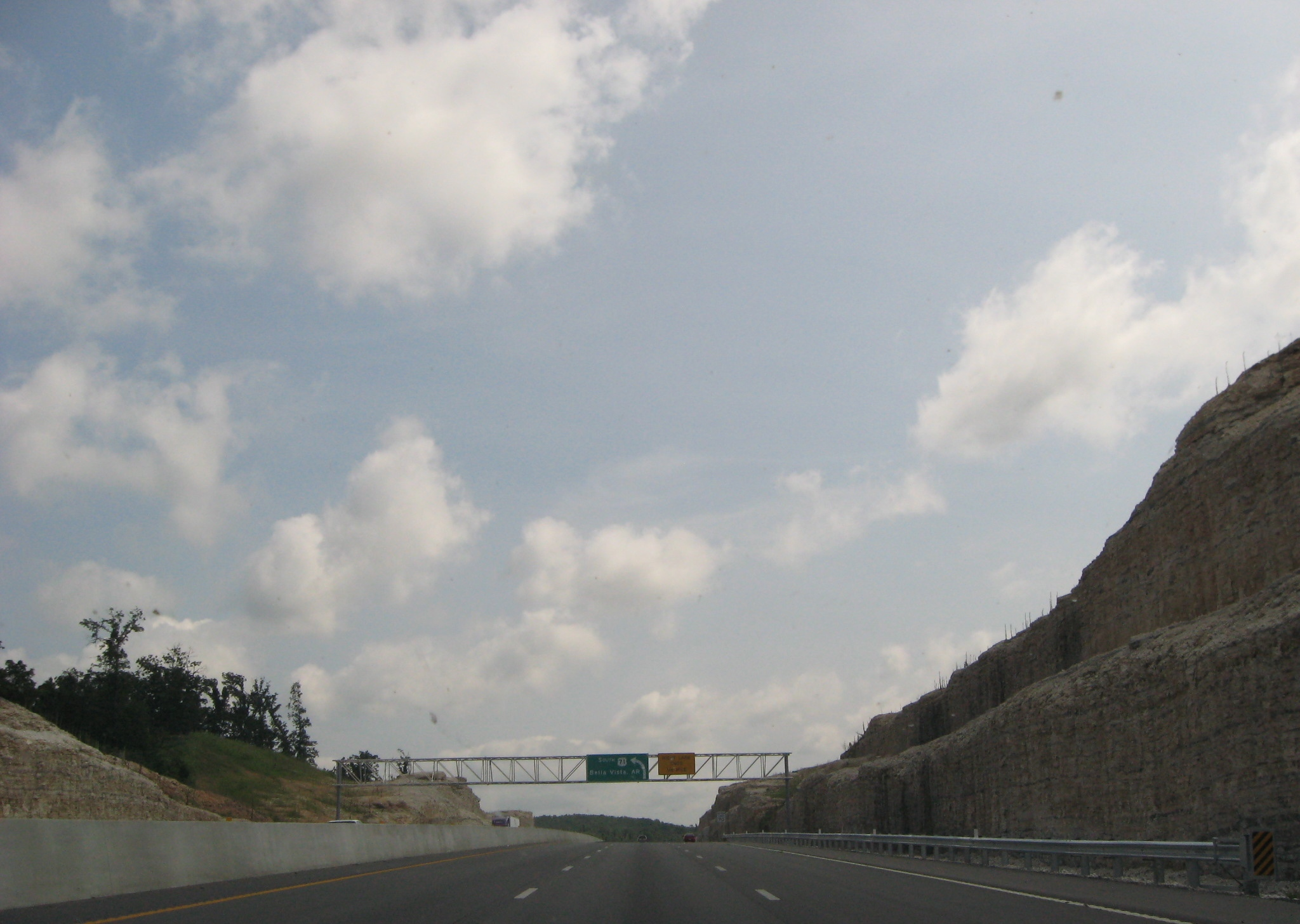
US 71 north of the Arkansas border prior to the completion of the Bella Vista Bypass.

== History ==
In 1971, the highway was mostly two lanes south of Harrisonville, with the present-day bypass of Nevada and a brief segment between Butler and Rich Hill being the only other four-lane sections open between Harrisonville and Joplin. However, by the end of the decade, much of the highway would be widened to four lanes, with a continuous four-lane highway now existing between Kansas City and the Barton-Jasper county line. Additionally, a short segment between Carthage and Webb City (present day Route 171) had been widened to four lanes.

By 1987, a continuous four-lane link existed between Kansas City and Carthage, including a bypass around Carthage, as well as a widening of Alt. US-71 south of Carthage to I-44, creating the present-day I-49 bypass around Carthage and Joplin. Save for a four-mile section of four-lane highway south of Neosho that was completed in the 1960s, the entire portion of US-71 (including Alt. US-71) south of Joplin to the Arkansas state line remained two lanes until 1999, when the present-day expressway from I-44 south to Neosho was completed. At this time, Alt. US-71 was decommissioned entirely, with the southern segment south of I-44 replaced by Route 59. By 2004, the present-day expressway had been extended south to Pineville.

Projects along the highway were also made in the northern part of the state around this time, as US-71 was widened from two to four lanes between Savannah and Maryville, with various sections opening between 2001 and 2004.

The future of part of the Bella Vista Bypass is on hold. On August 5, 2014, voters in Missouri defeated Amendment 7 at the polls, which would have provided funding various road construction projects in the state. After the measure's defeat, the funding for the connection from the existing southern end of I-49 in Missouri along the Bella Vista Bypass to the state line was in doubt, but Arkansas is moving ahead to construct all but the last connection to the state line. In March 2019, the Missouri Highways and Transportation Commission approved the remaining funding needed to complete the Bella Vista Bypass. Contracts was let in 2020. Construction began May 11, 2020, on Missouri's portion of I-49 and opened October 1, 2021.

== Major intersections ==
County	Location	mi	km	Exit	Destinations	Notes
McDonald	Caverna	0.000	0.000		US 71 south – Bella Vista	Continuation into Arkansas
McDonald	Caverna	0.253	0.407		Route OO to AR 279	
McDonald		4.406	7.091		Route 90 – Noel, Jane	
McDonald		7.363	11.850		US 71 Bus. north – Pineville	Northbound exit and entrance
McDonald		8.955	14.412		I-49 south – Fort Smith	Southbound exit and northbound entrance; exit 4 on I-49; southern end of I-49 overlap
see I-49
Jackson	Kansas City	187.674	302.032		I-435 north to I-70 west – Des Moines, Kansas City I-49 ends	Northern terminus and exit 183 on I-49
Jackson	Kansas City	188.563	303.463		Route W west (Bannister Road) to I-435	
Jackson	Kansas City	189.800– 190.014	305.453– 305.798		Hickman Mills Drive / Blue River Road / 85th Street / 87th Street	
Jackson	Kansas City	191.238	307.768		75th Street	Interchange
Jackson	Kansas City	191.785	308.648		Gregory Boulevard	At-grade intersection; north end of freeway section
Jackson	Kansas City	192.425– 192.780	309.678– 310.249		Meyer Boulevard / 63rd Street	Interchange
Jackson	Kansas City	193.252	311.009		59th Street	At-grade intersection
Jackson	Kansas City	197.749	318.246		55th Street	At-grade intersection; south end of freeway section
Jackson	Kansas City	194.842	313.568		US 56 west (Dr. Martin Luther King Jr. Boulevard) / Emanuel Cleaver II Boulevard	Eastern terminus of US 56
Jackson	Kansas City	195.896	315.264		39th Street	
Jackson	Kansas City	196.773– 196.897	316.675– 316.875		Linwood Boulevard / 31st Street	No direct southbound exit (signed at 29th Street)
Jackson	Kansas City	197.155– 197.414	317.290– 317.707		29th Street / 27th Street	
Jackson	Kansas City	197.883	318.462		The Paseo (Kansas City, Missouri)	No direct southbound exit (signed at 22nd Street)
Jackson	Kansas City	198.179	318.938		22nd Street	
Jackson	Kansas City	198.829	319.984		To US 40 east / US 24 east / Truman Road – St. Louis I-70 east to I-435 south – St. Louis, Joplin	Northbound exit and southbound entrance
Jackson	Kansas City	198.882	320.070		I-670 west to I-35 south – Wichita, Kansas	I-70 exit 2L
Jackson	Kansas City	198.935	320.155		US 40 east / US 24 east – St. Louis I-70 east to I-435 south – St. Louis, Joplin	Southern end of I-70/US 40 concurrency; US 71 south follows exit 2M; no direct northbound exit (signed at Truman Road)
Jackson	Kansas City	199.197	320.576		11th Street – Downtown Kansas City	Northbound exit only; Northern end of the Bruce Watkins Drive Memorial Parkway;I-70 exit 2J
Jackson	Kansas City	199.502	321.067		I-35 south / I-70 west / US 24 west / US 40 west – Wichita, Topeka I-29 begins	Northern end of I-70/US 40 concurrency; southern end of I-29/I-35 concurrency; southern end of I-29; US 71 follows exit 2G northbound & 3 southbound.
Jackson	Kansas City	199.546	321.138		To US 24 Bus. east (Independence Avenue) / Route 9 north / Admiral Boulevard	Northbound exit and southbound entrance; I-70 exit 2H
Jackson	Kansas City	199.609	321.240		To US 24 Bus. (Independence Avenue) / The Paseo (Kansas City, Missouri)	Southbound exit and northbound entrance; I-35 exit 4A
See I-35
Clay	Kansas City	204.115	328.491		I-35 north – Des Moines	Northern end of I-35 concurrency; US 71 follows exit 8B northbound; I-29 exit 1B
See I-29
Andrew		260.870	419.830		I-29 north / I-229 south – Council Bluffs, St. Joseph	Northern end of I-29 concurrency; US 71 follows exit 56A northbound.
Andrew		263.481	424.032		Route T – Amazonia, Savannah	
Andrew		266.195	428.399		US 59 north / US 71 Bus. south – Savannah	Interchange; northern end of US 59 concurrency
Andrew		271.914	437.603		Route 48 east – Rosendale	
Nodaway	Maryville	291.108	468.493		US 71 Bus. north / Route V – Maryville	Northern end of freeway
Nodaway	Maryville	293.590	472.487		US 136 east / Route 46 west – Maryville, Stanberry	Southern end of US 136 concurrency
Nodaway		295.705	475.891		Route 148 north – Pickering, Hopkins	
Nodaway		296.902	477.817		US 71 Bus. south / Route CC – Maryville	
Nodaway		307.845	495.429		US 136 west to I-29 – Burlington Junction	Northern end of US 136 concurrency
Nodaway		316.722	509.715		US 71 north – Braddyville	Continuation into Iowa
1.000 mi = 1.609 km; 1.000 km = 0.621 mi: Concurrency terminus; Incomplete access

== See also ==
U.S. Route 71
Previous state: Arkansas	Missouri	Next state: Iowa
