= Missouri State Highway System =

- Highway markers for Interstate 44, U.S. Route 61, Missouri Route 5 and Supplement Route A

System information
- Maintained by MoDOT

Highway names
- Interstates: Interstate nn (I‑nn)
- US Highways: U.S. Route nn (US nn)
- State: Route nn
- Supplemental Route: Supp-xx, SSR-xx

System links
- Missouri State Highway System; Interstate; US; State; Supplemental

In Missouri, odd-numbered highways run north-south and even-numbered highways run east-west (with a few exceptions, such as Route 112). Missouri also maintains a secondary set of roads, supplemental routes, which are lettered rather than numbered.

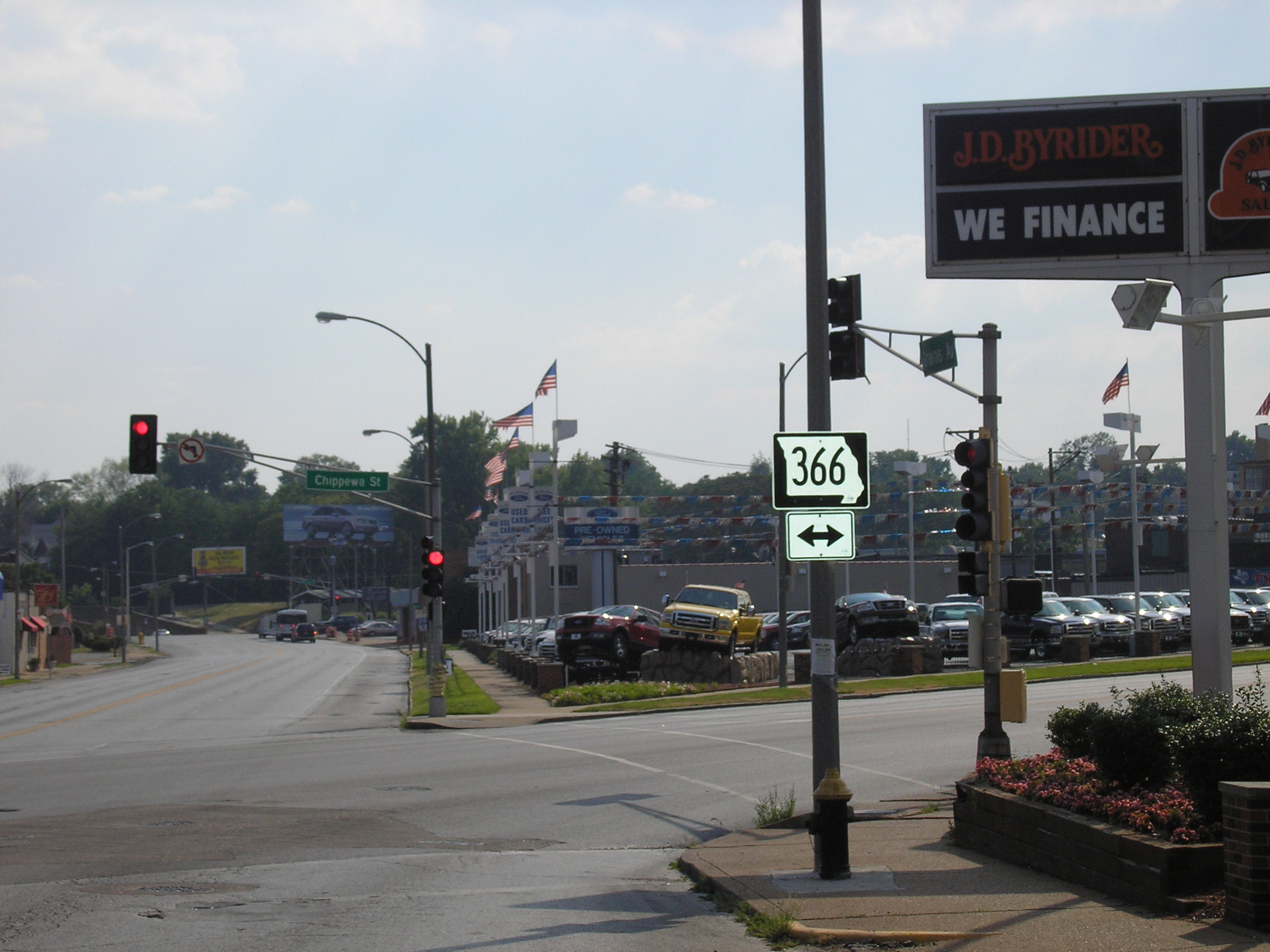
Route 366 in St. Louis

Missouri has also changed highway designations with a US route or an interstate with the same number is designated through the state (Route 40 was redesignated Route 14 to avoid duplicating numbers with US-40 which also passes through the state). There are a few instances of number duplication between federal and state highways (such as with Route 72 and I-72), but any such pairs of highways are nowhere near each other to avoid confusion.

In some states (such as Arkansas and New Mexico), highways are allowed to be discontinuous. Missouri overlaps highways in order to maintain continuity.

The Missouri Department of Transportation routinely uses the term "Route" in reference to the names of the roads. However, Missouri statutes define them as "State Highways". Missourians may use the terms "Route" and "Highway" interchangeably when referring to a state road.
