= Tornado outbreak of March 24–25, 1954 =

Weather event in the United States

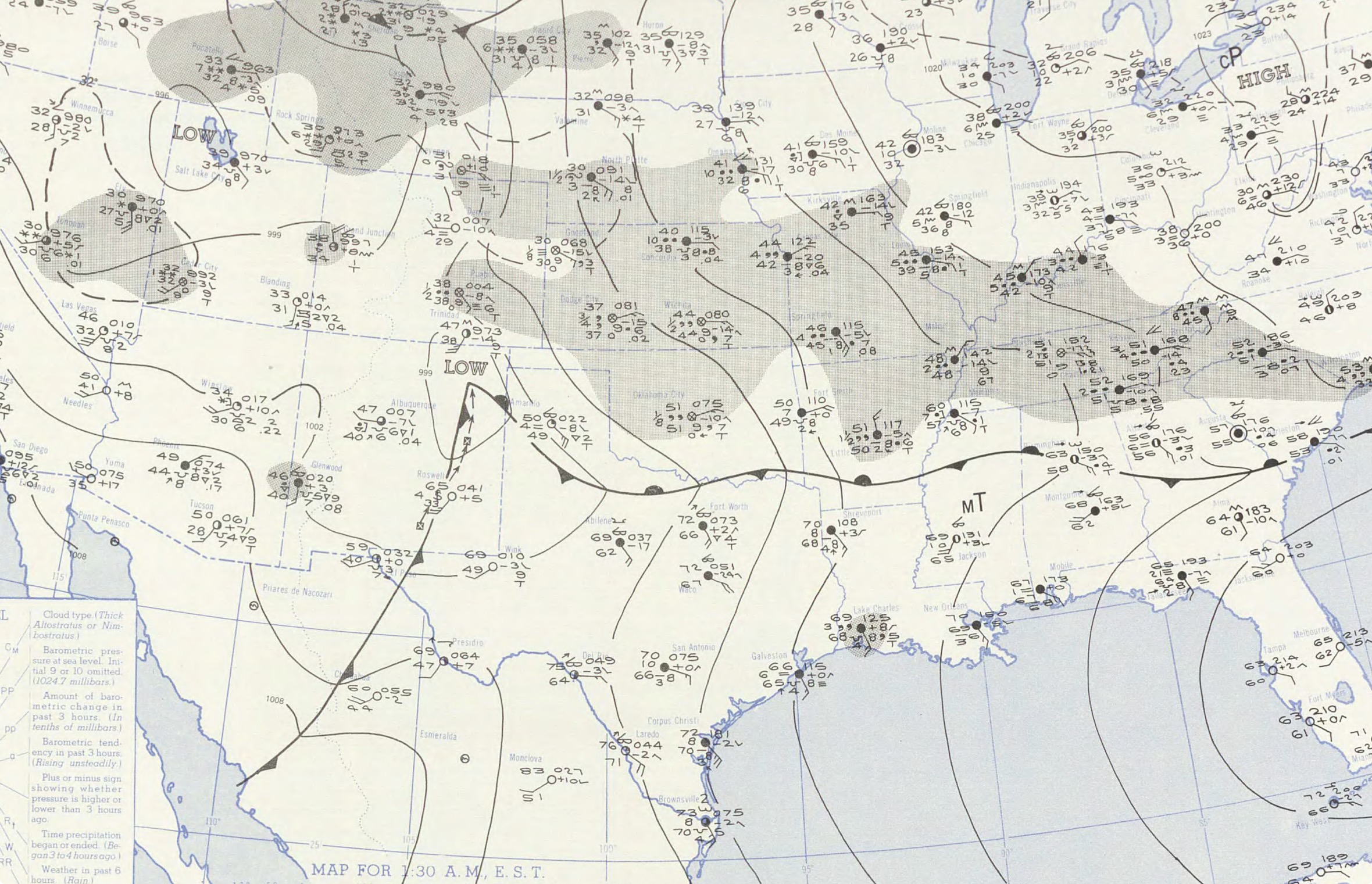
- Weather analysis on March 24, showing the low pressure system that produced the tornado outbreak

Tornado outbreak
- Tornadoes: 28
- Max. rating: F4 tornado
- Duration: March 24–25, 1954

Overall effects
- Fatalities: 2
- Injuries: 11
- Damage: $526,100 ($6,310,000 in 2025 USD) (Note: All losses are in 1954 USD unless otherwise noted.)
- Areas affected: Central and Southern United States
- Part of the tornadoes and tornado outbreaks of 1954

On March 24–25, 1954, a small-but-intense tornado outbreak affected portions of the Central and Southern United States, killing two people and injuring 11. The outbreak generated 18 significant (F2 or stronger) tornadoes, including a deadly, violent event, retroactively rated F4, in Texas County, Missouri. Another intense tornado, rated F3, injured two people in a rural part of Barry County, also in Missouri. An F2 tornado in Benton County, Missouri, injured four. In addition, an F1 tornado in Collin County, North Texas—in the Dallas–Fort Worth metroplex—injured four more. At least four tornadoes also occurred in or near Greater St. Louis, causing locally extensive damage, and a quartet of strong tornadoes hit Oklahoma, with a few more F2s striking Arkansas. (Note: An outbreak is generally defined as a group of at least six tornadoes (the number sometimes varies slightly according to local climatology) with no more than a six-hour gap between individual tornadoes. An outbreak sequence, prior to (after) the start of modern records in 1950, is defined as a period of no more than two (one) consecutive days without at least one significant (F2 or stronger) tornado.)

== Outbreak statistics ==
Daily statistics of tornadoes during the tornado outbreak of March 24–25, 1954
Date (Note: All dates are based on the local time zone where the tornado touched down; however, all times are in Coordinated Universal Time and dates are split at midnight CST/CDT for consistency.)	Total	F-scale rating (Note: The Fujita scale was devised under the aegis of scientist T. Theodore Fujita in the early 1970s. Prior to the advent of the scale in 1971, tornadoes in the United States were officially unrated. Tornado ratings were retroactively applied to events prior to the formal adoption of the F-scale by the National Weather Service. While the Fujita scale has been superseded by the Enhanced Fujita scale in the U.S. since February 1, 2007, Canada used the old scale until April 1, 2013; nations elsewhere, like the United Kingdom, apply other classifications such as the TORRO scale.)							Deaths	Injuries	Damage (Note: The National Oceanic and Atmospheric Administration's Storm Data publication does not list exact damage totals for every event, instead giving damage categories. As such, damage for individual tornadoes is not comprehensive.)
Date	Total	FU	F0	F1	F2	F3	F4	F5	Deaths	Injuries	Damage
March 24	16	0	0	8	8	0	0	0	0	8	$291,100
March 25	12	0	0	2	8	1	1	0	2	3	$235,000
Total	28	0	0	10	16	1	1	0	2	11	$526,100

== Confirmed tornadoes ==
Confirmed tornadoes by Fujita rating
FU	F0	F1	F2	F3	F4	F5	Total
0	0	10	16	1	1	0	28

Prior to 1990, there is a likely undercount of tornadoes, particularly E/F0–1, with reports of weaker tornadoes becoming more common as population increased. A sharp increase in the annual average E/F0–1 count by approximately 200 tornadoes was noted upon the implementation of NEXRAD Doppler weather radar in 1990–1991. (Note: Historically, the number of tornadoes globally and in the United States was and is likely underrepresented: research by Grazulis on annual tornado activity suggests that, as of 2001, only 53% of yearly U.S. tornadoes were officially recorded. Documentation of tornadoes outside the United States was historically less exhaustive, owing to the lack of monitors in many nations and, in some cases, to internal political controls on public information. Most countries only recorded tornadoes that produced severe damage or loss of life. Significant low biases in U.S. tornado counts likely occurred through the early 1990s, when advanced NEXRAD was first installed and the National Weather Service began comprehensively verifying tornado occurrences.) 1974 marked the first year where significant tornado (E/F2+) counts became homogenous with contemporary values, attributed to the consistent implementation of Fujita scale assessments. Numerous discrepancies on the details of tornadoes in this outbreak exist between sources. The total count of tornadoes and ratings differs from various agencies accordingly. The list below documents information from the most contemporary official sources alongside assessments from tornado historian Thomas P. Grazulis.

Color/symbol key
Color / symbol	Description
†	Data from Grazulis 1990/1993/2001b
¶	Data from a local National Weather Service office
※	Data from the 1954 Climatological Data National Summary publication
‡	Data from the NCEI database
♯	Maximum width of tornado
±	Tornado was rated below F2 intensity by Grazulis but a specific rating is unavailable.

=== March 24 event ===
Confirmed tornadoes – Wednesday, March 24, 1954
F#	Location	County / Parish	State	Start Coord. (Note: All starting coordinates are based on the NCEI database and may not reflect contemporary analyses)	Time (UTC)	Path length	Width (Note: The listed width values are primarily the average/mean width of the tornadoes, with those having known maximum widths denoted by ♯. From 1952 to 1994, reports largely list mean width whereas contemporary years list maximum width. Values provided by Grazulis are the average width, with estimates being rounded down (i.e. 0.5 mi (0.80 km) is rounded down from 880 yards to 800 yards.)	Damage
F1	Goltry	Alfalfa	Oklahoma	36.53°N 98.17°W	21:15–?	0.1 mi (0.16 km)	880 yd (800 m)	Unknown
F1	A brief tornado was reported.							
F2	ESE of Alfalfa	Caddo	Oklahoma	35.18°N 98.55°W	21:30–?	3 mi (4.8 km)†	75 yd (69 m)※	$4,900※
F2	Barns were wrecked on three farmsteads.							
F2	NNW of Newkirk	Kay	Oklahoma	36.93°N 97.10°W	01:05–?	3 mi (4.8 km)※	200 yd (180 m)	$9,700※
F2	Barns on a few farmsteads lost their roofs. Five outbuildings and another barn were wrecked elsewhere.							
F2±	E of Wellsville	Franklin	Kansas	38.73°N 95.05°W	02:30–?	0.1 mi (0.16 km)‡	33 yd (30 m)‡	$2,500
F2±	Sheds and barns were damaged on three farmsteads.							
F2±	NW of Chanute to NW of Moran	Wilson, Allen	Kansas	37.72°N 95.52°W	03:00–?	22.2 mi (35.7 km)	880 yd (800 m)	$25,000
F2±	Damage to farms may have commenced farther southwest in Wilson County than officially indicated.							
F1	Western Sapulpa to SW of Oakhurst	Creek	Oklahoma	36.00°N 96.12°W	03:05–03:20※	3.6 mi (5.8 km)	200 yd (180 m)	$2,500
F1	Garages and other structures were damaged.							
F2	Western Haskell	Muskogee	Oklahoma	35.82°N 95.68°W	03:25–?	1 mi (1.6 km)	33 yd (30 m)	$50,000※
F2	Half a dozen homes were damaged. A barn and a cannery were wrecked as well.							
F1	Frisco	Collin	Texas	33.15°N 96.82°W	03:30–?	4.9 mi (7.9 km)	67 yd (61 m)	$12,000※
F1	This tornado shattered windows and tore off roofing. Television antennae, sheds, and barns were damaged. A grain elevator was wrecked as well. Four injuries occurred.							
F1	SE of Cherryvale※	Montgomery	Kansas	37.20°N 95.62°W	03:30–?	2 mi (3.2 km)	440 yd (400 m)	$15,000※
F1	Many farms were damaged, and trees were prostrated.							
F1	E of Columbus※	Cherokee	Kansas	37.17°N 94.83°W	03:45–?	0.1 mi (0.16 km)	17 yd (16 m)	Unknown
F1	Farmsteads were damaged.							
F1	SE of Rose※ to NNE of Jay	Delaware	Oklahoma	36.20°N 94.97°W	04:00–?	20 mi (32 km)※	33 yd (30 m)	$7,500※
F1	Damage occurred on three farmsteads.							
F1	Burgess※	Barton	Missouri	37.12°N 94.53°W	04:00–?	0.5 mi (0.80 km)	17 yd (16 m)	$2,000※
F1	Agricultural implements and a garage were damaged.							
F2†	SW of Oakton to northern Lamar Heights to SW of Milford	Barton	Missouri	37.45°N 94.40°W	04:00–?	18 mi (29 km)†	100 yd (91 m)†	$100,000※
F2†	12 homes were severely damaged, and a quartet of barns were wrecked. Livestock was injured or killed as well.							
F1	NW of Seligman to W of Cape Fair	Barry	Missouri	36.55°N 93.97°W	04:00–?	23.9 mi (38.5 km)	50 yd (46 m)	$25,000
F1	This tornado passed near Washburn and ended near Flat Creek. Details are unavailable.							
F2±	W of Pensacola to Grand Lake o' the Cherokees※	Mayes, Craig※, Delaware※	Oklahoma	36.45°N 95.15°W	04:18–?	5.6 mi (9.0 km)	50 yd (46 m)	$25,000
F2±	Details are unavailable.							
F2†	Southern Centerton (1st tornado) to Bentonville to SW of Gateway	Benton	Arkansas	36.35°N 94.28°W	04:40–?	20.6 mi (33.2 km)	400 yd (370 m)	$10,000※
F2†	Numerous outbuildings, barns, and homes were destroyed or damaged. Many chickens were killed as well. Four people were injured.							

=== March 25 event ===
Confirmed tornadoes – Thursday, March 25, 1954
F#	Location	County / Parish	State	Start Coord.	Time (UTC)	Path length	Width	Damage
F2±	NE of Saratoga to Lanagan to WNW of Rocky Comfort	McDonald, Newton※	Missouri	36.57°N 94.52°W	05:00–?	26.1 mi (42.0 km)	50 yd (46 m)	$25,000
F2±	This tornado destroyed or damaged many small frame farmhouses. Outbuildings and barns were wrecked as well. Livestock was killed or injured along the path, and one person was injured.							
F2†	Fairview to Purdy to McDowell	Newton, Barry	Missouri	36.82°N 94.10°W	05:00–?	17.3 mi (27.8 km)	50 yd (46 m)	$5,000
F2†	Barns, little frame homes, outbuildings, chicken coops, and machinery were destroyed or damaged. Trees were torn up and carried many yards.							
F2†	Near Success	Texas	Missouri	Unknown	~05:00–?	10 mi (16 km)	Unknown	$25,000
F2†	A small home was destroyed, along with a barn. The tornado killed "thousands" of poultry.							
F3	ESE of Cato†	Barry	Missouri	36.72°N 93.67°W	05:30–?	2 mi (3.2 km)†	100 yd (91 m)†	$25,000
F3	A seven-room, twin-story house was torn apart. A few injuries occurred.							
F2†	S of Fordland to near Diggins† to N of Seymour※	Webster	Missouri	37.17°N 92.95°W	05:45–?	10 mi (16 km)†	400 yd (370 m)†	$20,000※
F2†	A factory and a warehouse were flattened, along with four barns. 20 cows were also killed.							
F2†	S of Selmore to Ozark	Christian	Missouri	36.97°N 93.23°W	05:45–?	5 mi (8.0 km)	600 yd (550 m)†	$20,000※
F2†	This strong tornado formed over Elk Valley, northwest of Christian Center, ripping the roof off a farmhouse and tearing away the front of another home. Barns were wrecked as well, and livestock was injured or killed. Debris obstructed vehicular and pedestrian traffic "for hours".							
F4	NW of Bendavis to SE of Old Success	Texas	Missouri	37.32°N 92.23°W	06:55–?	12.1 mi (19.5 km)	100 yd (91 m)	$25,000†
F4	2 deaths – This violent tornado hit more than 20 farms, tossing a vehicle a long distance. One home was obliterated, its debris scattered 2 mi (3.2 km). The dead were found 150 yd (450 ft) from the homesite. A truck, barns, and outbuildings were wrecked as well. Trees were uprooted and thrown many yards.							
F2†	SSE of Gilmore to W of Portage des Sioux	St. Charles	Missouri	38.80°N 90.80°W	08:00–?	21.6 mi (34.8 km)	20 yd (18 m)‡	$35,000※
F2†	A few small, anchor-bolted cottages were blown off their CMU foundations. A small home was wrecked as well. A hangar and a barn sustained damage.							
F1	W of West Alton	St. Charles	Missouri	38.87°N 90.25°W	08:00–?	1 mi (1.6 km)	60 yd (55 m)	$5,000※
F1	Outbuildings were tipped onto their sides. Other structures received minor damage. A porch lost its roof as well.							
F2	SW of Pacific to Maryland Heights†	Franklin, St. Louis†	Missouri	38.47°N 90.75°W	08:00–?	23 mi (37 km)†	30 yd (27 m)†	$40,000※
F2	This strong tornado unroofed a brick home and wrecked another. A CMU garage was demolished, and a 6-foot-long (2.0 yd) timber was embedded in the wall of a dining room. Windows, agricultural implements, and barns were destroyed or damaged as well.							
F1	Gray Summit※	Franklin	Missouri	38.58°N 90.77°W	08:00–?	≤20 mi (32 km)※	100 yd (91 m)‡	$5,000※
F1	Several walls were downed, and a brick home was extensively damaged.							
F2†	Southern Centerton (2nd tornado)	Benton	Arkansas	36.35°N 94.28°W	08:15–?	0.5 mi (0.80 km)	400 yd (370 m)†	$5,000※
F2†	A small barn and farmhouse were wrecked. Outbuildings were damaged and 3,000 fledgling chickens killed.							

== See also ==
- List of tornadoes and tornado outbreaks
  - List of North American tornadoes and tornado outbreaks
- Tornadoes of 1954

== Sources ==
- Agee, Ernest M.; Childs, Samuel (June 1, 2014). "Adjustments in Tornado Counts, F-Scale Intensity, and Path Width for Assessing Significant Tornado Destruction". Journal of Applied Meteorology and Climatology. 53 (6). American Meteorological Society: 1494–1505. doi:10.1175/JAMC-D-13-0235.1.
- Brooks, Harold E. (April 2004). "On the Relationship of Tornado Path Length and Width to Intensity". Weather and Forecasting. 19 (2): 310–19. Bibcode:2004WtFor..19..310B. doi:10.1175/1520-0434(2004)019<0310:OTROTP>2.0.CO;2.
- Cook, A. R.; Schaefer, J. T. (August 2008). "The Relation of El Niño–Southern Oscillation (ENSO) to Winter Tornado Outbreaks". Monthly Weather Review. 136 (8): 3121–3137. Bibcode:2008MWRv..136.3121C. doi:10.1175/2007MWR2171.1.
- Edwards, Roger; LaDue, James G.; Ferree, John T.; Scharfenberg, Kevin; Maier, Chris; Coulbourne, William L. (May 1, 2013). "Tornado Intensity Estimation: Past, Present, and Future". Bulletin of the American Meteorological Society. 94 (5). American Meteorological Society: 641–653. doi:10.1175/BAMS-D-11-00006.1.
- Grazulis, Thomas P. (May 1984). Violent Tornado Climatography, 1880–1982. OSTI (Technical report). NUREG. Washington, D.C.: Nuclear Regulatory Commission. OSTI 7099491. CR-3670.
  - — (November 1990). Significant Tornadoes 1880–1989. Vol. 2. St. Johnsbury, Vermont: The Tornado Project of Environmental Films. ISBN 1-879362-02-3.
  - — (July 1993). Significant Tornadoes 1680–1991: A Chronology and Analysis of Events. St. Johnsbury, Vermont: The Tornado Project of Environmental Films. ISBN 1-879362-03-1.
  - — (2001a). The Tornado: Nature's Ultimate Windstorm. Norman: University of Oklahoma Press. ISBN 978-0-8061-3538-0.
  - — (2001b). F5-F6 Tornadoes. St. Johnsbury, Vermont: The Tornado Project of Environmental Films.
- National Weather Service (March 1954). Storm Data Publication (Report). National Centers for Environmental Information – via Storm Events Database.
- U.S. Weather Bureau (March 1954). "Storm data and unusual weather phenomena". Climatological Data National Summary. 5 (3). Asheville, North Carolina: National Climatic Data Center: 69–72.
