= Missouri Route 43 =

State highway in Missouri, U.S.

Route 43

Route information
- Maintained by MoDOT
- Length: 98.380 mi (158.327 km)

Major junctions
- South end: AR 43 / SH-20 at the Arkansas–Oklahoma state tripoint near Southwest City
- US 60 in Seneca; I-44 in Joplin; US 160 near Mindenmines
- North end: US 54 in Vernon County

Location
- Country: United States
- State: Missouri

Highway system
- Missouri State Highway System; Interstate; US; State; Supplemental
← Route 42	→ I-44

Route 43 is a highway in western Missouri. Its northern terminus is at U.S. Route 54 midway between Nevada and Deerfield. Its southern terminus is at the corner of Missouri (near Southwest City), Arkansas, and Oklahoma where it continues down the Arkansas/Oklahoma state line as both Arkansas Highway 43 and OK-20.

== Route description ==
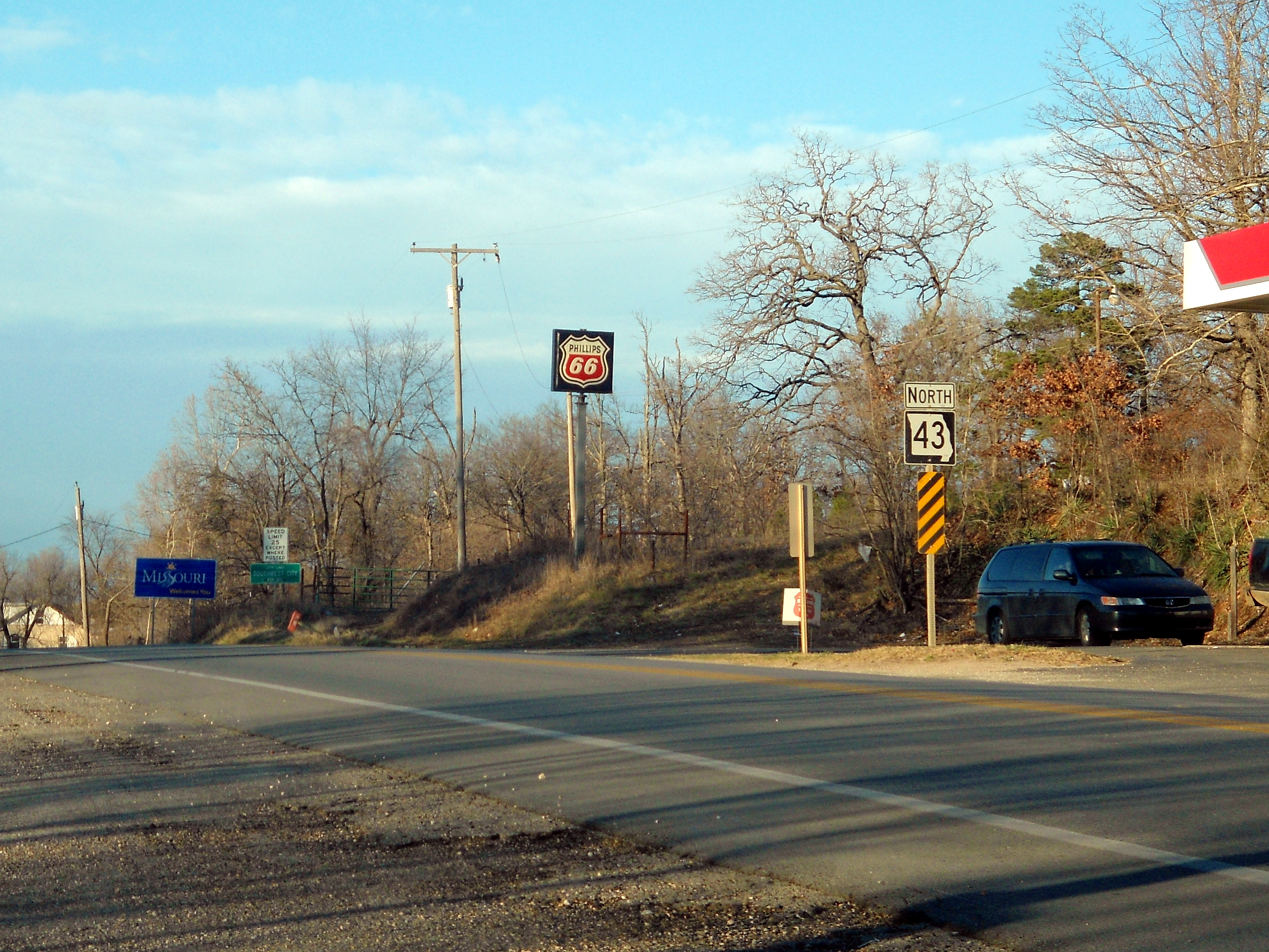
First reassurance marker heading north, Route 43, Southwest City, Missouri. Near the AR/MO/OK tripoint

North of Joplin, Route 43 is a relatively straight highway. It intersects U.S. Route 160 in Barton County west of Lamar. A few miles south of there it intersects Route 126. Just north of Joplin, it intersects Route 96.

In Joplin, the highway is known as Main Street and passes through the old historic downtown area. For a few blocks, it is historic US Route 66 until it reaches Seventh Street (Route 66), where Route 66 goes west. It joins Business Loop I-44 until it reaches Interstate 44, then joins this road for one exit west, then turns south again.

When Route 43 reaches Seneca (where it has a junction with U.S. Route 60), it comes within a half mile of Oklahoma and stays relatively close to it all the way to the intersection with Route 76 east of Tiff City. All through this area, the highway becomes more hilly and curvy. The road serves as the western terminus of Route 90 just before reaching Southwest City. South of Southwest City, the highway runs less than a mile before reaching the corner of Missouri, Arkansas, and Oklahoma becoming the concurrency of Arkansas Highway 43 and OK-20. A stone marker is erected at the corner of the three states.

== Major intersections ==
County	Location	mi	km	Destinations	Notes
OKARMO Corner		0.000	0.000	AR 43 south / SH-20 west	Continuation into Arkansas and Oklahoma
McDonald	Prairie Township	3.169	5.100	Route 90 east – Noel	
McDonald	McMillen Tiff Township	11.719	18.860	Route 76 east – Anderson	Southern end of Route 76 overlap
McDonald	McMillen Tiff Township	14.462	23.274	Route 76 west – Tiff City	Northern end of Route 76 overlap
Newton	Seneca	25.641	41.265	US 60 – Wyandotte, Neosho US 60 Bus. begins	Roundabout; southern end of US 60 Business overlap
Newton	Seneca	26.519	42.678	US 60 Bus. west – Wyandotte	Northern end of US 60 Business overlap
Newton	Joplin	39.451	63.490	I-44 west – Tulsa	Southern end of I-44 overlap; exit 4
Newton	Joplin	41.931	67.481	I-44 east – Springfield I-44 BL begins / Route 86 east (Hearnes Boulevard)	Northern end of I-44 overlap; southern end of Loop 44 overlap; exit 6
Jasper	Joplin	45.274	72.861	I-44 BL / Route 66 (7th Street)	Northern end of Loop 44 overlap
Jasper	Joplin	47.349	76.201	Zora Street	Interchange
Jasper	Airport Drive	49.377	79.465	Route 171 (DeMott Drive)	Roundabout
Jasper	Twin Groves–Mineral township line	53.364	85.881	Route 96 to Route 171 – Carthage	Roundabout
Barton	Nashville Township	67.796	109.107	Route 126 – Pittsburg, Golden City	
Barton	Central Township	74.161	119.351	US 160 – Mindenmines, Lamar	
Vernon	Deerfield Township	98.380	158.327	US 54 – Nevada, Deerfield	
1.000 mi = 1.609 km; 1.000 km = 0.621 mi: Concurrency terminus

== Related route ==
=== Seneca truck route ===
Route 43 Truck
- Location: Seneca
- Length: 1.97 mi (3.17 km)

Route 43 Truck is used to bypass a steep grade on Route 43 just south of Seneca, Missouri. This route is unsigned and concurs with US 60 Bus.
