= Bushnell =

Bushnell may refer to:

== Places ==
=== United States ===
- Bushnell, Florida, a city
  - Bushnell Army Airfield, a World War II airfield
- Bushnell, Georgia, an unincorporated community
- Bushnell, Illinois, a city
- Bushnell Township, McDonough County, Illinois
- Bushnell Township, Michigan
- Bushnell, Missouri, an unincorporated community
- Bushnell, Nebraska, a village
- Bushnell, South Dakota, a town
- Bushnell Park, Hartford, Connecticut
- Bushnell Peak, Colorado
- Bushnell Rock Formation, Oregon

=== Antarctica ===
- Mount Bushnell, Ross Dependency

== People ==
- Asa S. Bushnell (Governor) (1834–1904), American politician, 40th governor of Ohio and president of the Warder, Bushnell and Glessner Company, which became one of four companies that merged to form International Harvester
- Aaron Bushnell (1998–2024), American serviceman who self-immolated in front of the Embassy of Israel in Washington, D.C.
- Bert Bushnell (1921–2010), British rower, 1948 Olympic gold medalist in double sculls
- Bob Bushnell (1915–2016), American bass player and guitarist
- Candace Bushnell (born 1958), American journalist and author
- Colin J. Bushnell (1947–2021), British mathematician
- Cornelius Scranton Bushnell (1829–1896), American railroad executive and shipbuilder who helped build the USS Monitor for the Union Navy
- Daniel Bushnell (1808–1891), American industrialist
- David Bushnell (inventor) (1754–1824), American inventor
- David Bushnell (historian) (1923–2010), American academic and Latin American historian
- David P. Bushnell (1913–2005), American entrepreneur
- Dennis M. Bushnell, NASA scientist
- E. A. Bushnell (1872–1939), American newspaper cartoonist
- Edward Bushnell (1876-1951), American Olympic track and field athlete
- Emily Bushnell (born 1950), Tufts University professor of psychology
- Geoffrey Bushnell (1903–1978), British archaeologist
- George E. Bushnell (1887–1965), member of the Michigan Supreme Court from 1934 to 1955
- Horace Bushnell (1802–1876), American Congregational minister and theologian
- John Bushnell (died 1701), English sculptor
- Katharine Bushnell (1855–1946), American medical doctor, Christian writer, medical missionary to China, Bible scholar, and social activist
- Kenneth Wayne Bushnell (1933–2020), American visual artist
- Linda Bushnell, American electrical engineer and control theorist
- Milo C. Bushnell (1824–1897), American politician, Wisconsin pioneer
- Nehemiah Bushnell (1813–1873), American attorney, businessman and politician
- Nolan Bushnell (born 1943), American engineer and entrepreneur who founded Atari, Inc. and the Chuck E. Cheese's Pizza-Time Theaters chain
- O. A. Bushnell (1913–2002), American microbiologist, historian, novelist and professor
- Prudence Bushnell (born 1946), American diplomat
- Robert T. Bushnell (1896–1949), American politician and Massachusetts Attorney General
- Thomas Bushnell (born 1967), formerly Michael Bushnell, programmer and GNU contributor
- Washington Bushnell (1827–1885), American politician and Illinois Attorney General

== Other uses ==
- Bushnell Corporation, American manufacturer of optics and outdoor gear
- Bushnell Center for the Performing Arts, a theater venue in Hartford, Connecticut
- Bushnell University, a private Christian university in Eugene, Oregon
- USS Sumner (AGS-5), a survey ship that was originally commissioned as the USS Bushnell (AS-2) submarine tender in honor of David Bushnell
- USS Bushnell (AS-15), a submarine tender commissioned in 1943

== See also ==
- Helen Gilbert (1922–2012), American artist also known as Helen Gilbert-Bushnell
