= Milford Township, Barton County, Missouri =

Township in the US state of Missouri

Milford Township
- Township
- Location in Barton County
- Coordinates: 37°34′52″N 094°06′38″W
- Country: United States
- State: Missouri
- County: Barton

Area
  - Total: 30.03 sq mi (77.79 km^{2})
  - Land: 29.98 sq mi (77.66 km^{2})
  - Water: 0.050 sq mi (0.13 km^{2}) 0.17%
- Elevation: 980 ft (300 m)

Population (2000)
  - Total: 290
  - Density: 9.6/sq mi (3.7/km^{2})
- GNIS feature ID: 0766281

Milford Township is a township in Barton County, Missouri, USA. As of the 2000 census, its population was 290.

== Geography ==
Milford Township covers an area of 30.03 square miles (77.8 km^{2}). The township contains one incorporated settlement, Milford, from which it takes its name. According to the USGS, it contains two cemeteries: Howell and Round Prairie.

The streams of Hyder Branch, Lacey Branch, Patton Branch, Ring Branch and White Oak Branch run through this township.
