= Missouri Route 37 =

State highway in Missouri, U.S.

Route 37

Route information
- Maintained by MoDOT
- Length: 78.683 mi (126.628 km)
- Existed: 1922–present

Major junctions
- South end: AR 37 at the Arkansas state line in Seligman
- Route 112 in Seligman; Route 90 in Washburn; Route 37 Bus. / Route 76 / Route 86 / Route 112 in Cassville; US 60 in Monett; Route 97 in Pierce City; I-44 / I-44 BL in Sarcoxie; Route 96 in Avilla
- North end: US 160 / Route 126 in Golden City

Location
- Country: United States
- State: Missouri

Highway system
- Missouri State Highway System; Interstate; US; State; Supplemental
← US 36	→ Route 38

Route 37 is a highway in southwest Missouri. Its northern terminus is at U.S. Route 160 in Golden City (it shares this terminus with Route 126); its southern terminus is at the Arkansas state line where it continues as Highway 37, though it only runs very briefly before ending at U.S. Route 62 in Gateway, Arkansas.

== Route description ==
Route 37 begins as a continuation of Arkansas Highway 37 which starts about one half of a mile south of the state line in Gateway, Arkansas. It then passes through Seligman and intersects the southern terminus of Route 112. Route 37 then intersects Route 90 in Washburn and then enters Cassville, where it intersects Route 86 and the northern terminus of Route 112. From here, it produces a business route that goes through Downtown Cassville. Route 37 continues north all the way into Monett where it intersects US 60 before it turns west. The junction of US 60 is where Route 37 becomes part of the Trail of Tears Automobile Route going all the way down to the Arkansas state line. It then goes through Pierce City where it forms a wrong way concurrency with Route 97 for 0.2 miles (0.32 km).

Route 37 continues northwest, passing through Wentworth and Sarcoxie. It becomes concurrent with Interstate 44 Business as it heads west from Sarcoxie, also forming a wrong way concurrency until it interchanges Interstate 44. It then continues north, passing through Reeds and then Avilla, where it runs concurrent with Route 96. After leaving Avilla, Route 37 continues north and enters Golden City. It becomes concurrent with Route 126 before it reaches its northern terminus while Route 126 reaches its eastern terminus at the junction of US 160.

== Major intersections ==
County	Location	mi	km	Destinations	Notes
Barry		0.000	0.000	AR 37 south to US 62 – Gateway	
Barry	Seligman	0.532	0.856	Route 37 Bus. north – Business District	
Barry	Seligman	2.047	3.294	Route 112 north / Route DD west – Roaring River State Park	
Barry	Seligman	2.275	3.661	Route 37 Bus. south – Business District	
Barry	Washburn	7.737	12.451	Route 90 west – Jane	
Barry	Cassville	14.763	23.759	Route 76 / Route 86 / Route 112 south / Route 37 Bus. north – Exeter, Cassville, Roaring River State Park	
Barry		17.903	28.812	Route 37 Bus. south – Cassville, Crowder College Cassville Campus	
Barry	Monett	32.547	52.379	US 60 – Granby, Aurora, Monett Municipal Airport	
Lawrence	Pierce City	38.745	62.354	Route 97 north to I-44	Southern end of Route 97 overlap
Lawrence	Pierce City	38.899	62.602	Route 97 south to US 60	Northern end of Route 97 overlap
Jasper	Sarcoxie	51.039	82.139	I-44 BL east to I-44 – Mount Vernon	Southern end of I-44 Bus. overlap
Jasper		53.809	86.597	I-44 – Joplin, Springfield	I-44 exit 26; northern end of I-44 Bus. overlap
Jasper		62.327	100.306	Route 96 west / Historic US 66 west – Carthage	Southern end of Route 96 / Historic US 66 overlap
Jasper	Avilla	63.291	101.857	Route 96 east / Historic US 66 east – Phelps	Northern end of Route 96 / Historic US 66 overlap
Barton	Golden City	78.003	125.534	Route 126 west to I-49 / US 71	Southern end of Route 126 overlap
Barton	Golden City	78.683	126.628	US 160 / Route 126 ends – Lockwood, Lamar	Northern end of Route 126 overlap
1.000 mi = 1.609 km; 1.000 km = 0.621 mi

== Route 37 Business ==
=== Official ===
- Cassville
- Seligman

=== Locally signed, not official ===
- Purdy
- Butterfield
