= Missouri Route 126 =

State highway in Missouri, U.S.

Route 126
- Route 126 highlighted in red

Route information
- Maintained by MoDOT
- Length: 29.226 mi (47.035 km)
- Existed: c. 1942–present

Major junctions
- West end: K-126 at the Kansas state line near Pittsburg, KS
- I-49 / US 71 near Jasper
- East end: US 160 / Route 37 in Golden City

Location
- Country: United States
- State: Missouri
- Counties: Barton

Highway system
- Missouri State Highway System; Interstate; US; State; Supplemental
← Route 125	→ Route 127

Route 126 is a highway located entirely within Barton County in the U.S. state of Missouri. Its western terminus is at the Kansas state line, where K-126 ends. The route goes in a straight line for most of its length, and intersects Interstate 49 (I-49) and U.S. Route 71 (US 71). Its eastern terminus is at US 160 and Route 37 in Golden City. The route was designated in 1942, and formerly consisted of two supplemental routes.

== Route description ==
Route 126 starts at the Kansas state line, where K-126 ends. The road travels east for around seven miles in a straight line, intersecting Route M and Route 43. Route 126 continues eastward, crossing through farmland and a few trees. After the route intersects Route J, it meets a frontage road parallel to I-49/US 71. The road crosses over North Fork Spring River and continues east. Soon, Route 126 intersects I-49/US 71 at a diamond interchange, and intersects a frontage road again. The route crosses a railroad owned by Missouri and Northern Arkansas Railroad, and intersects Routes JJ and T. Four miles later, the route enters Golden City and becomes Main Street. It becomes concurrent with Route 37. The routes goes through downtown Golden City, and turn slightly northeast. The two routes end at US 160 at a T-intersection. US 160 continues eastward toward Lockwood. In 2012, Missouri Department of Transportation (MoDOT) calculated as many as 840 vehicles traveling east of I-49/US 71, and as few as 480 vehicles traveling west of I-49/US 71. This is expressed in terms of annual average daily traffic (AADT), a measure of traffic volume for any average day of the year.

== History ==
The road that became Route 126 was built and designated, as supplemental Route D around 1935. It connected from US 71 to US 160 in Golden City. By 1940, supplemental Route H was designated, connected from Route 43, to a dead end east of it. A year later, Route H was extended west to the Kansas state line. In 1942, Route 126 was designated, replacing Route H from the state line to Route 43. Around 1945-1949, Route H was extended east to Route Z, and the same route was extended east for a few miles east of Route Z in 1954. Around 1955, Route H and D were removed in the supplemental route system, and was replaced by Route 126, as the two sections became connected. Later, Route 126 was repaved in concrete, from the state line to Route 43. The whole route was repaved by 1957. In 1979, US 71 was moved to a freeway alignment, but an interchange wasn't built until 2010-2013. I-49 became co-signed with US 71 in December 2012.

== Major intersections ==
The entire route is in Barton County.

Location	mi	km	Destinations	Notes
	0.000	0.000	K-126 – Pittsburg	Continuation as K-126
	3.417	5.499	Route M to US 160	
	7.406	11.919	Route 43 – Joplin, Liberal	
	10.425	16.777	Route Y	Northern terminus of Route Y
	11.429	18.393	Route O to US 160	Southern terminus of Route O
	14.455	23.263	Route J	
	17.426– 17.534	28.044– 28.218	I-49 / US 71 – Kansas City, Joplin	Diamond interchange; exit 70
	20.500	32.992	Route JJ	Northern terminus of Route JJ
	23.520	37.852	Route T – Kenoma	
Golden City	28.546	45.940	Route 37 – Avilla	Western end of Route 37 concurrency
Golden City	29.226	47.035	US 160 / Route 37 – Lockwood, Lamar	Eastern end of Route 37 concurrency; Eastern terminus of Route 126; Northern terminus of Route 37
1.000 mi = 1.609 km; 1.000 km = 0.621 mi: Concurrency terminus
