= Lamar Township, Barton County, Missouri =

Township in the American state of Missouri

Lamar Township
- Township
- Location in Barton County
- Coordinates: 37°29′44″N 094°15′01″W
- Country: United States
- State: Missouri
- County: Barton

Area
  - Total: 64.76 sq mi (167.72 km^{2})
  - Land: 64.4 sq mi (166.9 km^{2})
  - Water: 0.32 sq mi (0.82 km^{2}) 0.49%
- Elevation: 994 ft (303 m)

Population (2000)
  - Total: 1,569
  - Density: 24/sq mi (9.4/km^{2})
- GNIS feature ID: 0766279

Lamar Township is a township in Barton County, Missouri, United States. As of the 2000 census, its population was 1,569. The township completely surrounds, but does not include, the city of Lamar, Missouri.

== Geography ==
Lamar Township covers an area of 64.76 square miles (167.7 km^{2}) and contains one incorporated settlement, Lamar Heights. According to the USGS, it contains four cemeteries: Fair View, Lake, Nigh and Saint Marys.

The streams of Dicks Fork, Elm Branch and Pettis Creek run through this township.

== Transportation ==
Lamar Township contains one airport, Lamar Municipal Airport.
