= Oskaloosa =

Oskaloosa may refer to a place in the United States:

- Oskaloosa, Iowa
- Oskaloosa, Kansas
- Oskaloosa, Missouri
