= Bank of Carthage =

Bank of Carthage may refer to:

- Bank of Carthage (Arkansas), historic business and building in Carthage, Arkansas
- Bank of Carthage (Missouri), historic business in Carthage, Missouri
- Citizens Bank (Carthage, Tennessee) in Carthage, Tennessee
- Hometown Bank of Carthage in Carthage, Missouri
