= South West Township, Barton County, Missouri =

Township in the American state of Missouri

South West Township
- Township
- Location in Barton County
- Coordinates: 37°26′25″N 094°34′26″W
- Country: United States
- State: Missouri
- County: Barton

Area
  - Total: 52.03 sq mi (134.77 km^{2})
  - Land: 51.8 sq mi (134.1 km^{2})
  - Water: 0.26 sq mi (0.67 km^{2}) 0.5%
- Elevation: 958 ft (292 m)

Population (2000)
  - Total: 669
  - Density: 13/sq mi (5/km^{2})
- GNIS feature ID: 0766287

South West Township is a township in Barton County, Missouri, USA. As of the 2000 census, its population was 669.

South West Township lies in the southwestern corner of Barton County, hence the name.

== Geography ==
South West Township covers an area of 52.04 square miles (134.8 km^{2}) and contains one incorporated settlement, Mindenmines. According to the USGS, it contains one cemetery, Mindenmines.

The stream of Glendale Fork runs through this township.
