= Barton City Township, Barton County, Missouri =

Township in the US state of Missouri

Barton City Township
- Township
- Location in Barton County
- Coordinates: 37°35′56″N 094°26′06″W
- Country: United States
- State: Missouri
- County: Barton

Area
  - Total: 36.57 sq mi (94.71 km^{2})
  - Land: 36.5 sq mi (94.6 km^{2})
  - Water: 0.042 sq mi (0.11 km^{2}) 0.12%
- Elevation: 915 ft (279 m)

Population (2000)
  - Total: 256
  - Density: 7.0/sq mi (2.7/km^{2})
- GNIS feature ID: 0766274

Barton City Township is one of fifteen townships that make up Barton County, Missouri, USA. As of the 2000 census, its population was 256.

The township was named after the community of Barton City, now known as Hannon.

== Geography ==
Barton City Township covers an area of 36.57 square miles (94.7 km^{2}) and contains no incorporated settlements. According to the USGS, it contains one cemetery, Barton City.
