= Boston, Missouri =

Unincorporated community in Missouri, U.S.

Coordinates: 37.4128°N 94.2817°W

Boston is an unincorporated community in southern Barton County, Missouri, United States. It is situated approximately halfway between Lamar and Jasper, and is about one mile northeast of the intersection of U.S. Route 71 and Route 126 on county roads. It once had a post office, but mail is now delivered from Lamar.

The town was first established as Nodaway City. On February 13, 1851, a change of name to ‘Boston’ was granted at Jefferson City, as detailed in the Democratic Banner newspaper dated February 25, 1851. A post office called Boston was established in 1891, and remained in operation until 1971. The community is named after Boston, Massachusetts.
