= Richland Township, Barton County, Missouri =

Township in the US state of Missouri

Richland Township
- Township
- Location in Barton County
- Coordinates: 37°25′42″N 094°12′53″W
- Country: United States
- State: Missouri
- County: Barton

Area
  - Total: 50.71 sq mi (131.33 km^{2})
  - Land: 50.54 sq mi (130.91 km^{2})
  - Water: 0.16 sq mi (0.42 km^{2}) 0.32%
- Elevation: 958 ft (292 m)

Population (2000)
  - Total: 611
  - Density: 12/sq mi (4.7/km^{2})
- GNIS feature ID: 0766286

Richland Township is a township in Barton County, Missouri, USA. As of the 2000 census, its population was 611.

Richland Township was so named on account of their fertile soil.

== Geography ==
Richland Township covers an area of 50.71 square miles (131.3 km^{2}) and contains no incorporated settlements.

The streams of Dorris Creek, Little Coon Creek and West Fork Spring River run through this township.
