= Avilla R-13 School District =

School district in Missouri, U.S.

Avilla R-XIII School District

Location
- Avilla Jasper County, Missouri United States
- Coordinates: 37°03′17″N 94°26′11″W

District information
- Type: Public
- Grades: K–8
- Established: 1880s
- Superintendent: Russell Cruzan
- NCES District ID: 2904110

Students and staff
- Students: 163
- Teachers: 12 (on FTE basis)
- Student–teacher ratio: 14:1
- District mascot: Panther
- Colors: White; Blue

Other information
- Website: avillapanthers.org

Avilla R-13 School District or Avilla R-XIII School District is a rural public elementary and middle school located in Avilla, Missouri, USA. For grades kindergarten through eight, it is the only school in the district. In the 2000 census, the district schooled 153 pupils and had 13 teachers on staff. Programs include basketball and agriculture, and the school boasts a low student to teacher ratio. Avilla is located at 37°11′38″N 94°07′44″W, in Jasper County ten miles east of Carthage, Missouri on MO Route 96 and four miles west of the Lawrence County line.

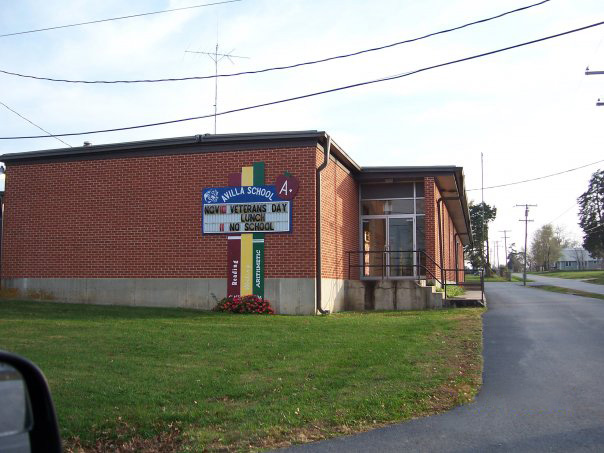
Avilla R-13 School in 2009, home of the Panthers. This newer red brick addition to the older part of the (second) school was constructed in the 1970s.

== History ==
Prior to the American Civil War the first schoolhouse in the Avilla area was a one-room dirt-floor log cabin, located about one and a half miles southeast of the future town site near White Oak Creek. The White Oak School was established by the early pioneers in the 1840s. School sessions during the Antebellum Era were split into two periods each school year, with a summer session and a winter session because students were needed at home for Spring planting and Fall harvest.

Avilla was founded in 1856, and during the Civil War the townsmen fended off enemies and avoided the destruction of their new village, barely nine years old at war's end. Consequently, Avilla was an overnight boom town during the Reconstruction Era and in 1865 much of the rest of Jasper County lay in ruins. All schools in the region had been closed during the war and many had been burned to the ground. Old time residents later claimed that Avilla had actually been the largest operating town in Jasper County for a short time after hostilities ended, and the population swelled to over five hundred. More one-room school houses were constructed and used for classes in the growing Avilla locality until the 1880s when the first large school in town was founded, one block north from the present school site located at what is now named "School Street" in its honor. This first Avilla School taught grades 1-12 (called lower, upper and high school), and operated into the 20th century. The old Avilla School was heated with coal burning stoves, used water hand drawn from a water well and utilized wooden outhouses. It was eventually replaced by a modern structure with indoor plumbing and electricity. The initial building was then demolished, and private residences were later built over the original school grounds.

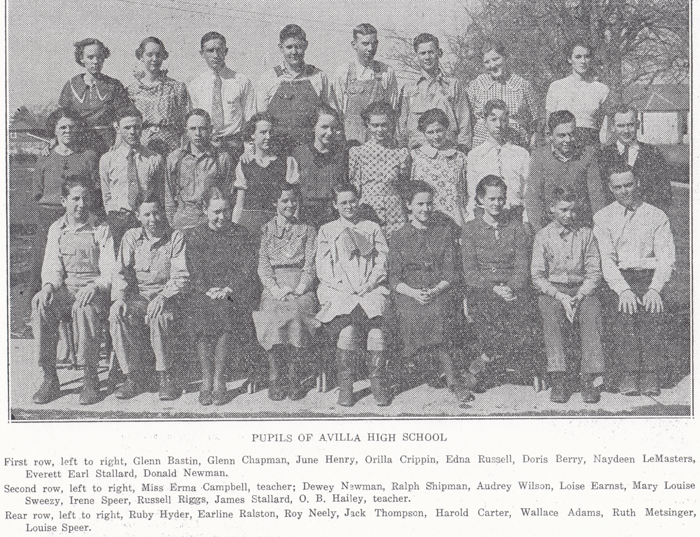
Avilla High School pupils 1936 - 1937, Avilla, Missouri. Clipping from The Carthage Press dated April 3, 1937. During the 1930s grade cards were marked “H” “M” and “L,” meaning high, medium and low. Classes would start at 9:00 A.M. giving the students time to do farm chores (feeding animals, milking cows, etc.) before it was time to be at school.

The current (second) school building was erected one block south of the original site. The Missouri General Assembly passed the Hawkins School Reorganization Act in 1948 to promote the consolidation of rural school districts into larger and more efficient systems. Under this act any reorganized school district was required to have an assessed valuation or property in the district of at least $500,000 and record an average daily attendance of at least 100 pupils. Through the 1950s and 1960s the rest of the one-room schools which were still operating in that part of Jasper County were consolidated and centralized in the newly rebuilt Avilla school. The original country schoolhouse teachers were brought together to form the elementary/middle school Avilla R-XIII School District (meaning: Avilla Reorganized School District #13). The Avilla school then became the only one in the district. Because it spans grades kindergarten though eighth, high school level students thereafter were sent to neighboring Carthage, Sarcoxie, or Golden City, Missouri for continued studies. Today Avilla eighth-grade graduating students may also choose to attend high school at Miller or Jasper, Missouri as well. In the 1970s the building was expanded on the west side (new front) with a red brick addition for the library, classrooms and offices. A security fence was later added and improvements continue to the present time.

In 2013 the village of Avilla, Missouri is considered one of the living ghost towns of historic route 66 and long established family traditions in livestock raising and agriculture continue in the region. Avilla R-13 School District has served this rural community from the early beginnings.
