= Elk Valley =

Elk Valley may refer to:

- Elk Valley (British Columbia), valley in Canada
- Elk Valley (Missouri), valley in United States
- Elk Valley, Tennessee, unincorporated community in United States
- Elk Valley Park, Alberta, locality in Rocky View County, Alberta, Canada
- Elk Valley Provincial Park, provincial park in Alberta, Canada
- Elk Valley Rancheria, settlement in California, United States
