= Newport Township, Barton County, Missouri =

Township in the US state of Missouri

Newport Township
- Township
- Location in Barton County
- Coordinates: 37°31′42″N 094°06′13″W
- Country: United States
- State: Missouri
- County: Barton

Area
  - Total: 30.49 sq mi (78.96 km^{2})
  - Land: 30.46 sq mi (78.89 km^{2})
  - Water: 0.027 sq mi (0.07 km^{2}) 0.09%
- Elevation: 1,014 ft (309 m)

Population (2000)
  - Total: 354
  - Density: 12/sq mi (4.5/km^{2})
- GNIS feature ID: 0766283

Newport Township is a township in Barton County, Missouri, USA. As of the 2000 census, its population was 354.

The township takes its name from Newport, Missouri.

== Geography ==
Newport Township covers an area of 30.49 square miles (79.0 km^{2}) and contains no incorporated settlements. According to the USGS, it contains one cemetery, Cook.

The streams of Cold Branch and Painter Branch run through this township.
