= Oakton =

Oakton may refer to:

== Places ==
=== United States ===
- Oakton, Georgia, a place in Georgia
- Oakton, Kentucky, on Kentucky Route 58
- Oakton, Missouri
- Oakton, Virginia

=== Fictional ===
- Oakton, the fictional setting of The Nut Job

== Other uses ==
- Eric Oakton (1906–1981), English footballer
- Oakton College, Des Plaines and Skokie, Illinois
- Oakton High School, Fairfax County, Virginia

== See also ==
- Oakton–Skokie station, Skokie, Illiniois
- Oaktown (disambiguation)
