= Esrom (disambiguation) =

Esrom is a type of cheese.

Esrom may also refer to:

- Esrom, Missouri, US
- Esrom Nyandoro (born 1980), Zimbabwean footballer

== See also ==
- Lake Esrum, Denmark
