= Union Township, Barton County, Missouri =

Township in the US state of Missouri

Union Township
- Township
- Location in Barton County
- Coordinates: 37°35′09″N 094°17′31″W
- Country: United States
- State: Missouri
- County: Barton

Area
  - Total: 36.2 sq mi (93.7 km^{2})
  - Land: 36.07 sq mi (93.41 km^{2})
  - Water: 0.11 sq mi (0.29 km^{2}) 0.31%
- Elevation: 948 ft (289 m)

Population (2000)
  - Total: 347
  - Density: 9.6/sq mi (3.7/km^{2})
- GNIS feature ID: 0766288

Union Township is one of fifteen townships in Barton County, Missouri, USA. As of the 2000 census, its population was 347.

Union Township was formed by means of merger, or "union" of existing townships, hence the name.

== Geography ==
Union Township covers an area of 36.18 square miles (93.7 km^{2}) and contains no incorporated settlements. According to the USGS, it contains one cemetery, Bakers Grove.

The streams of Bucks Run Creek, Little Creek and Moores Branch run through this township.
