= Avilla, Missouri =

- Village
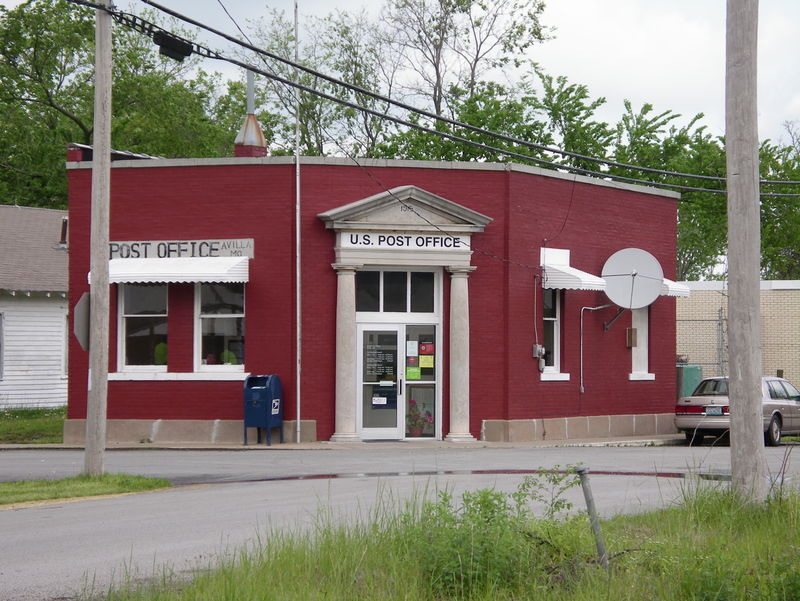
- US Post Office, Avilla, Missouri
- Nicknames: 'Villa, Missoura
- Motto: Panther Country
- Location of Avilla, Missouri
- Coordinates: 37°11′38″N 94°07′47″W
- Country: United States
- State: Missouri
- County: Jasper

Area
  - Total: 0.20 sq mi (0.51 km^{2})
  - Land: 0.20 sq mi (0.51 km^{2})
  - Water: 0 sq mi (0.00 km^{2})
- Elevation: 1,122 ft (342 m)

Population (2020)
  - Total: 103
  - Density: 526.9/sq mi (203.43/km^{2})
- Time zone: UTC-6 (Central (CST))
  - Summer (DST): UTC-5 (CDT)
- ZIP code: 64833
- Area code: 417
- FIPS code: 29-02746
- GNIS feature ID: 2396581

Avilla is a rural village in Jasper County, Missouri, United States. The population was 103 at the 2020 census. It is part of the Joplin, Missouri Metropolitan Statistical Area. Avilla is the fourth-oldest settlement in Jasper County today, founded in 1856. It was platted and laid out for public use on July 23, 1858, by Andrew L. Love and David S. Holman.

== Geography ==
Avilla is located at 37°11′38″N 94°7′44″W (37.193821, −94.128991), ten miles east of Carthage, Missouri, on MO Route 96 (formerly Historic U.S. Route 66) and four miles west of the Lawrence County line. The village is surrounded by pasture and farmland, small forested areas, and branching spring-fed streams. White Oak Creek is the nearest to the south and east, and Dry Fork & Deer Creek to the north. Spring River runs past about three miles to the south, which is eventually fed by these headwater streams.

According to the United States Census Bureau, the village has a total area of 0.20 square miles (0.52 km^{2}), all land.

== History ==
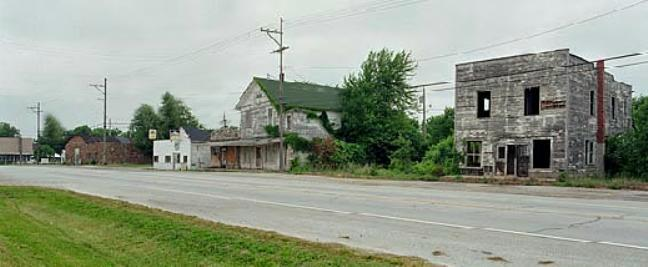
Storefronts once lined this strip in Avilla, Missouri, one of the living "ghost towns of old Route 66." The Avilla House, built in 1868 (far right), and an early Route 66 era Auto Shop, Tom Barbado's Garage (second stone structure from left), can be seen in this 2000 photo before being demolished. Old Flo's Tavern (white building) still stands today next to the abandoned stone IOOF Lodge and (Old French's) grocery store (center).

=== 1831–1861 ===
==== Founders of Avilla ====
Pioneers who came to this region in the 1830s and 1840s saw a "beautiful prairie land, interspersed with timbered belts along winding streams". Settlement of the grasslands presented more challenges than other types of terrain, and for this reason, northeastern Jasper County developed more slowly than the rest of the county. Split-log homes were built near wooded locations, and rock and sod were also used in early constructions. Although families were many miles apart, they still called each other neighbors. Some of the earliest settlers near present-day Avilla were John K. Gibson in 1831 (just across the Lawrence County line), James Blackwell in 1835, and John Fishburn on White Oak Creek in 1836. Nelson Knight was the first settler on the prairie north of Avilla, building a cabin and farm in 1837, and Jasper County itself was established in 1841. Thomas Buck came all the way from Indiana in a wagon drawn by a team of horses in the 1840s and built a farm just east of the future town site.

The first schoolhouse in the Avilla area was a one-room, dirt-floor log cabin also founded in the 1840s, called White Oak School, located about 1.5 miles (2.4 km) southeast near White Oak Creek. Arriving with his family in 1853, Dr. Jaquillian M. Stemmons was the first physician to practice medicine in the Avilla area, doing so from his 400 acres (1.6 km^{2}) farm. The town of Avilla was founded in 1856 and platted and laid out for public use on July 23, 1858, by Andrew L. Love and David S. Holman. Mr. Love was the first Justice of the Peace, and Mr. Holman was the first merchant and postmaster, establishing the post office in 1860. A Dr. Young later came just before the Civil War and established a medical office within the town limits.

"The Indians, during the eighteen thirties, were plentiful but were for the most part friendly, and made war on nothing except the smoke-house and the corn-crib."

— Excerpt from A history of Jasper County, Missouri, and its people, vol. 1 by Joel Thomas Livingston

==== Indigenous People ====
This had been the hunting grounds of the Osage Indians who were known to have camped at nearby Spring River, about 3 miles (4.8 km) to the south. Their lands to the east had been previously purchased by the government in 1808 (Treaty of Fort Clark), and other tribes had been moved to this location as well, and then later all were moved again to the Osage Nation areas elsewhere. Notwithstanding, a few that possibly returned or had simply refused to leave could still be seen trading in Avilla and the nearby towns throughout the Antebellum Period.

==== Avilla at the Beginning of the Civil War ====
By 1861, there were several small river mill settlements, some mining camps, and about nine or ten towns (seven platted) in Jasper County, Missouri. Avilla was newly formed and "bustling" with over one hundred citizens (compare with the county seat of Carthage that had an estimated population between four and five hundred at that time). As in all of the border state towns, families in Avilla were split over the question of Missouri secession, and some were slave owners. Dr. Jaquillian M. Stemmons actually owned eight inherited slaves himself; however, he and the other town leaders were Unconditional Unionists and remained aligned with newly elected president Abraham Lincoln. Dr. J.M. Stemmons never bought or sold slaves and was known to have retained his family's inherited slaves simply for their very own safety. He supported the abolition of slavery in the United States.

Avilla's political alignment was in sharp contrast to neighboring Sarcoxie to the south, where the first regional Confederate flag was raised. The rebel "Stars & Bars" also flew over Carthage 10 miles (16 km) to the west in 1861, following an early Confederate victory at the Battle of Carthage on July 5. At a distance of only two counties away, Arkansas had already become the ninth state to secede, and on October 28, 1861, Governor Claiborne Fox Jackson met with the Missouri General Assembly in Neosho and declared Missouri as the twelfth state to join the Confederate States of America. In spite of being engulfed by the Confederacy, the United States flag continued to fly over Avilla, boldly hoisted to the top of a flagpole in the town center park and guarded by the townsmen. Schoolhouses were closed and many families evacuated their women and small children to safer areas in other states.

=== 1861–1865 ===
==== Confederate guerrillas attack ====
Dr. Jaquillian M. Stemmons, an early settler, town leader, and staunch Union man, organized a company of local men and neighbors in Avilla for the protection of their own homes from roaming bands of bushwhackers. In 1861, this town militia, also known as the "Avilla Home Guard", was one of the first in the area and consisted predominantly of the oldest citizens, as most of the younger men were leaving to join regular military forces. This action was strongly opposed by local secessionists, and it was even rumored that a price had been placed on the doctor's head. By March 1862, the town militia had been tipped off about an impending assault, and General James G. Blunt at Fort Scott, Kansas had pledged reinforcements, but they had not yet arrived. After nightfall on March 8, 1862, a group of over a hundred pro-Confederate guerrillas, believed to have been led by William T. Anderson, attacked northeast of Avilla, routed perimeter sentries, and engaged defenders at Dr. Stemmon’s home. Defending were about 25 town militiamen and some men from Carthage who were there attending a meeting about the organization of a county-wide patrol.

A US Cavalry officer named Captain Tanner was also there recruiting men for the Union Army. The rebels surrounded the two-story log home and were met with heavy gunfire, but the doctor and his sons, Bud, Pole, and Jimmie were trapped inside with many of the men. After numerous attempts to penetrate the defense, amidst flying buckshot and bullets, the attackers managed to ignite the cabin, and it eventually burned to the ground. Dr. Stemmons and Lathan Duncan, an Avilla militiaman, were killed, several others shot and burned, and two were taken prisoner (the number of guerrilla casualties was not recorded). After the house was lost to flames, the heavily outnumbered militia withdrew and scattered in the darkness. They re-formed near the north edge of Avilla and braced for another onslaught, but it did not occur. The guerrilla force instead ended the attack and rode east toward Springfield, where the two elderly prisoners were later "given stern warnings to leave the state" and released.

Dr. J.M. Stemmons had been considered an "influential area figure against secession", and this was thought to be a chief motive for the attack and his murder. Nevertheless, the "defiant and heroic actions" of Dr. Stemmons, Mr. Duncan, and the town militia's "bold resistance" undoubtedly repelled further violence and probably prevented the burning of Avilla on that or ensuing dates. Names that are known of the courageous militiamen and allies defending on that night also included: Miles Overton, George Moose, Jap Moody, Ben Key, Cavalry Chapman, Robert Seymour, Orange Clark, Humphrey Robinson, Tom Driver, James S. Carter, Reuben Fishburn, William Club (seriously wounded), Nelson Knight (taken prisoner), Rabe Paul and Coleman Paul, Isaac Schooler, "Dutch" Brown (taken prisoner), Nip Walker, Peter Baker, Renard Napper and Cpt. Tanner from Fort Scott (The Captain was a Union Army Recruiting Officer and reportedly continued to fight after taking a shotgun blast to the face).

Humphrey Robinson (1812–1864) was abducted in 1864 by bushwackers from his Lawrence County, Missouri farm and never seen again. Many, at the time, believed he was recognized by his captors as one who stood against them in the defense of Avilla and was killed in retaliation. A marker to his memory was laid beside his widow at Gray's Point Cemetery, near Miller, Missouri.

==== A Gruesome Warning to Bushwhackers ====
The rebel attack on the Stemmons home was intended to terrorize and diffuse, but essentially had the opposite effect, infuriating the townsmen and altering the defensive efforts to offensive as everyone in Avilla took up arms. The Union Army gained possession of Missouri in 1862, but the terrain encompassing Avilla remained plagued with bushwhackers and occasionally small bands of Confederate regulars or guerrilla raiders on horseback. The town militia inherently became the earliest county militia for a period, headquartered in Avilla (this was before the formation of the Missouri County Militias in 1864). The patrol areas were then extended within eastern Jasper and western Lawrence Counties. Patrols of mounted militiamen were augmented by a few Union soldiers of the US Cavalry and continued to protect the town and countryside in several local skirmishes. Many bushwackers were tracked down and shot, and within a short time, the rest of them grew to fear the deadly Avilla "pioneer marksmen". In one account, a rebel’s skeleton was found just south of town with a bullet hole in the skull, and his name was never identified. He had apparently been killed during a previous skirmish with militiamen, but his remains were not found until they were in an advanced state of decomposition. The skull was then hung from the "Death Tree" in Avilla, suspended from a tree limb for over a year near the road at the Dunlap apple orchard "as a warning to all other bushwhackers".

==== Union Army Garrison at Avilla ====
By 1863, the Enrolled Missouri Militia was stationed at the Union Army garrison in Avilla; these new soldiers were under the command of Major Morgan. Tents were erected, and storehouses, barns, and homes were converted to temporary Army barracks & headquarters which housed hundreds of soldiers at various times, and several refugees. The town became known to the Missouri Militiamen informally as "Camp Avilla'", and by 1864, many of the original town militiamen continued to assist the new Missouri Militia, functioning as patrol leaders in the newly organized Jasper County Militia. Avilla supported anti-guerrilla operations in the region while under Lieutenant-Colonel T.T. Crittenden of the Missouri State Militia's 7th Cavalry, and served as a way station when needed in the transportation of Confederate Prisoners of War. Being situated in open grassland, Avilla was able to maintain a formidable and effective defense and became a sanctuary for refugees of nearby burned-out towns such as Carthage, but the county remained dangerous until the end and even for some time after the war.

=== 1865–1900 ===
==== Boom town during the Reconstruction Era ====
"Avilla is one of the oldest towns in the county and is in the center of a rich farming district. On account of having no railroad facilities, its growth was materially retarded, but its citizens are highly progressive, intelligent, and patriotic."

— Excerpt from Avilla I.O.O.F. Celebration of 1886, A history of Jasper County, Missouri, and its people, Volume 1 By Joel Thomas Livingston.

Avilla fended off and avoided destruction during the Civil War, and was an overnight boom town during the Reconstruction Era at war's end. Merchandise and construction materials were hauled by wagon train from Sedalia, Missouri, the closest railroad shipping point to Avilla. Much of Jasper County lay in ruins, and local merchants and businessmen grew wealthy during the rebuilding of Carthage, Sarcoxie, and other nearby war-damaged communities. Many old-time residents later claimed that Avilla had actually been the largest operating town in Jasper County after hostilities ended, for a short time. Commerce even came from as far away as Kansas, by farmers traveling to Avilla to buy seed, building supplies, and provisions. Captain Thomas Jefferson Stemmons, a Union commander and son of the late Dr. J.M. Stemmons, returned home to Avilla and started a mercantile with partner D. B. Rives, which was the first new business established after the Civil War. The first hotel was called The Avilla House and was erected two years later, in 1868, by Justice Hall. Through the 1870s and 1880s there were two general stores (dry goods & clothing), two grocery stores, one or more doctor's offices, one "notion" (sewing) store, two boot & shoe stores, one livery & feed stable, three churches, a drug store, a Grand Army of the Republic post (GAR) and two "secret societies": the Freemasons Lodge and the Independent Order of Odd Fellows Lodge (IOOF) and houses sprang up everywhere. Located at what is now named "School Street", the first Avilla school in town was built in the 1880s and taught grades 1 through 12 (called lower, upper, and high school). Sources disagree, but some documents cite the town's population at over five hundred during these years, not including families on the farms encircling just beyond the town limits. Despite the initial spurt after the Civil War, the growth of the town was stunted because the railroad was not built through Avilla. Farmland was the primary natural resource and without industry the population never increased after this time, and regular stage lines were eventually discontinued.

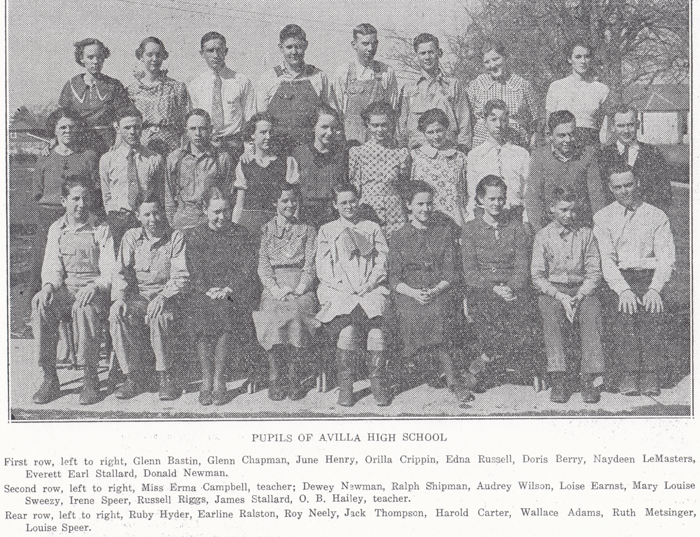
Avilla High School pupils 1936–1937

==== Avilla Zouaves in the Spanish–American War ====
After the battleship USS Maine exploded at Havana, Cuba, in February 1898, a "war fever" against Spain swept through America with the cry: "Remember the Maine!" On March 4, 1898, a highly charged war rally was held at the Avilla Methodist Church. Three attorneys gave rousing speeches to the packed house, fueled with patriotic songs from a ladies' choir. As a result, fifty-three young men immediately volunteered for military service in a new company that would be known as the Avilla Zouaves. These units were characterized by colorful uniforms and/or precision drilling patterned after the French Zouaves, and were very stylish in the 19th century military. The Avilla youth would be designated in the US Army as Company G, 5th Missouri Infantry Regiment. Two months later, the new Avilla unit was escorted by flag-bearing GAR members to the Carthage Train Depot, and with music from the Light Guard Band were ceremoniously sent off for battle in the Spanish–American War. The fighting in Cuba was over quickly, and the 5th Missouri Infantry was mustered out on November 9, 1898, before the Avilla Zouaves saw any action. Although they did not fight in the war, this event illustrates the raw patriotic spirit of Avilla, Missouri, still present in 1898.

=== 1900–1970 ===
==== The Bank of Avilla and Robbery of 1932 ====
The Bank of Avilla was established on September 18, 1914, and the building was completed in 1915. Samuel Salyer was the first majority stockholder and cashier (the title "cashier" was applied to bank officers & managers). Mr. Ivy E. Russell became majority stockholder and cashier in 1919, remaining for its duration, with the stock ledger ending in 1944. Handling farm and business loans, the small bank remained profitable even through the Great Depression of the 1930s, though records are incomplete. This in itself is quite remarkable, as almost half of the banks in America had either closed or merged in the 1930s. The productive farms surrounding the town had established Avilla as a valuable agricultural and livestock raising community.

The Bank of Avilla was the target of a successful armed robbery on May 18, 1932, by members of the notorious "Irish O'Malley Gang", which also resulted in the kidnapping of the cashier. The O'Malley Gang were typical Depression-era outlaws who had merged with another group of thugs known as the "Ozark Mountain Boys". On that Wednesday in 1932, the bank cashier, Mr. Ivy E. Russell, was robbed at gunpoint inside the bank by two men. He was then kidnapped and driven toward Carthage, Mo, where he was tossed out of the car and left by the roadside. One of the culprits was a "sawed-off shotgun-wielding gangster" named Jack Miller, who drove the getaway car. It is not known if the undisclosed amount was ever recovered, and records do not show if or how bank customers were reimbursed (notes and deposits were not insured at this time). After a lengthy spree of bank hold-ups, store robberies, and murders throughout the Midwest, all of the O'Malley Gang were eventually captured. Some gang members were killed or found dead, and one was sentenced to a 75-year prison term for the Avilla bank robbery. Additional facts about the crime can be pieced together through various newspapers. In 1938 Frank Layton and Jack Miller were pulled over by police in Arkansas, and were charged with violating the 1934 National Firearms Act (because of Jack's sawed-off shotgun). This in turn became part of a famous landmark Second Amendment case known as "The Miller Case" and United States v. Miller. Jack Miller himself was murdered one month before the Supreme Court's decision. Jack's bullet-riddled body turned up on the bank of Spencer Creek in Rogers County, Oklahoma.

In spite of having been robbed and kidnapped, Ivy E. Russell continued to operate the Bank of Avilla for at least twelve more years. A great crime wave of robberies and violence swept across the Midwest in 1932. Following the Avilla caper, Mr. Russell increased security measures by keeping a large caliber firearm behind the teller window, and additional measures that remain a secret to this day. It is known that Bonnie & Clyde of the infamous "Barrow Gang" were near the area in Joplin, Missouri, mere months after the Bank of Avilla robbery by the O'Malley Gang. The Barrow Gang was undoubtedly "casing out" banks to rob as well. Local lore has it that Clyde Barrow entered the Bank of Avilla, looked Russell in the eye, and then saw his .45 holstered while he stood behind the teller window. Clyde allegedly tipped his hat, said "'Afternoon", then turned around and promptly left. Though this is a local legend, it is safe to assume that many other Depression-era hoodlums passed through town as well. The bank always remained open during normal hours, with Ivy E. Russell as the cashier. The Bank of Avilla was never robbed again.

As more roads were paved and transportation in the vicinity significantly improved, the need for a local bank diminished. At some point around 1944, its assets were transferred to the Bank of Carthage, and the bank building was vacated for a few years. The property was then leased by the government on April 1, 1952, to house the United States Post Office.

==== Avilla "Gets Kicks" on Route 66 ====
The trail that went through the center of Avilla, east & west, was known as "Old Carthage Road", and it was paved and became part of U.S. Route 66 in the late 1920s. This kept business flowing as the little town became one of the stops on "The Mother Road", the main highway through the heart of America in those years. Population growth had already apexed before the 20th century but the town continued to make modern improvements such as a volunteer fire department, a hardware store & lumber yard (owned by Raymond Ziler, burned in 1971), a barbershop, a beauty salon, (Florida Melugin's or "Old Flo's") tavern, The Avilla Cafe (Jack & Nadine "Sours" Couch), several auto service stations (in town and proximity) and repair shops for farm equipment and automobiles, a farm implement sales (Chapman-Follmers), a seed mill, a Boy Scout meeting hall (Scoutmaster Joseph A. Norris Sr.) and in later years even an arena grounds was constructed for the Avilla Rodeo (Avilla Saddle Club) 1 mile (1.6 km) west of town. A larger school building was also built, and the old one-room school houses, which were still operating and spread out in that part of Jasper County, were consolidated and centralized in Avilla. The original country schoolhouse teachers were brought together to form the elementary/middle school Avilla R-13 School District. The Avilla school became the only one in the district. Because the school spans grades kindergarten though eighth, high school level students thereafter were sent to neighboring Carthage, Sarcoxie, Jasper, Miller or Golden City, Missouri, for continued studies.

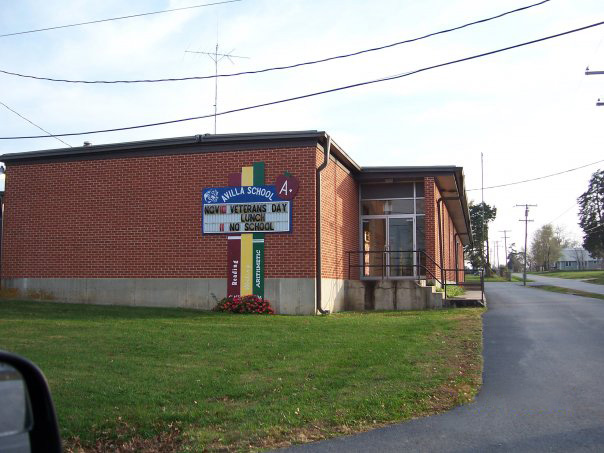
Avilla R-13 School in 2009, this addition to the older school building was constructed in the 1970s.

=== 1970 – present ===
==== Living ghost town ====
Avilla had actually started to decline in the 1940s after World War II, when greater numbers of people (especially young adults) from the already small community began moving to larger industrial cities for employment opportunities. The final turning point was in the 1960s, when US Route 66 was bypassed with I-44 (the Interstate Highway System). The lost commerce due to the diverted traffic caused many of the remaining businesses to fail or to be relocated in the 1970s. In 1971, a large fire broke out at the Avilla lumberyard, which destroyed several buildings, including most of the lumber company, the Boy Scout Meeting Hall, and some private residences. The lumberyard was later rebuilt, but by the late 1970s, deteriorating town shops had been sold & resold, and finally deserted. The only trades that survived were the ones that could be sustained by the dwindling local population and area farming operations. Most of the earliest buildings are now gone, replaced by noticeable empty spaces and vacant lots. US Route 66 was redesignated MO Route 96 in 1985, but by then Avilla was already a small, quiet rural community not unlike what is witnessed there today. Few abandoned structures remain within the present village as silent reminders of the town's heyday.

Avilla is considered one of the living "ghost towns of old Route 66". It was never completely abandoned and retains its village status today. Many antique country homes and farmhouses can be seen dotted about the Avilla countryside, and long-established family traditions in livestock raising and agriculture continue in the area. The rural community with local 4-H clubs & the Harvest Community Church are currently restoring the Avilla Saddle Club Arena. A few examples of period architecture can still be viewed, such as the iconic 19th-century Avilla (United) Methodist Church, which was the first church established in Avilla, located in the northeast part of town. A Civil War-era mercantile edifice (Stemmons & Rives) also endures near the old park at the west village entrance. Although it has been threatened with closure because of government cut-backs, 21st century visitors and residents can enjoy the nostalgic and well-preserved 1915 bank building, complete with the old time teller windows, vault and vintage postal equipment as it continues to fly Old Glory and serve as Avilla's US Post Office.

The Bank of Avilla was listed on the National Register of Historic Places in 2022.

== Notable people ==
- James M. Craven – State representative of Missouri, moved to Avilla and went into politics in 1866.
- Walter Stemmons – professor of journalism and university publications editor-in-chief at the University of Connecticut

== Etymology ==
Avilla, Missouri, was named on or before 1858, based on plat documentation. However, the origin of the name remains a mystery. The town was founded by Andrew L. Love and David S. Holman, merchant-landowners who wanted to sell goods and property at the edge of the frontier in the mid-1850s, but little information was recorded by them. In the United States, the list of similarly named places includes: a small town in Noble County, Indiana, a township in Comanche County, Kansas, and an unincorporated community in Saline County, Arkansas.

Robert Lee Meyers theorized that Avilla, Missouri, was named after Avilla, Indiana in Place Names In The Southwest Counties of Missouri, his 1930 thesis at the University of Missouri-Columbia. Although early settlers did come to Avilla, Missouri, from Indiana in 1875, Judge Edwin Randal documented that the Indiana town was known as Hill Town until 1875, changing to Avilla seventeen years after the Missouri town was named.

== Demographics ==
Historical population
Census	Pop.	Note	%±
1930	165		—
1940	178		7.9%
1950	142		−20.2%
1960	174		22.5%
1970	119		−31.6%
1980	151		26.9%
1990	99		−34.4%
2000	137		38.4%
2010	126		−8.0%
2020	103		−18.3%
U.S. Decennial Census

=== 2010 census ===
As of the census of 2010, there were 125 people, 44 households, and 35 families residing in the village. The population density was 625.0 inhabitants per square mile (241.3/km^{2}). There were 54 housing units at an average density of 270.0 per square mile (104.2/km^{2}). The racial makeup of the village was 90.4% White, 2.4% Native American, and 7.2% from two or more races. Hispanic or Latino of any race were 4.8% of the population.

There were 44 households, of which 43.2% had children under the age of 18 living with them, 63.6% were married couples living together, 11.4% had a female householder with no husband present, 4.5% had a male householder with no wife present, and 20.5% were non-families. 18.2% of all households were made up of individuals, and 4.5% had someone living alone who was 65 years of age or older. The average household size was 2.84, and the average family size was 3.00.

The median age in the village was 38.5 years. 28.8% of residents were under the age of 18; 8% were between the ages of 18 and 24; 20.8% were from 25 to 44; 28.8% were from 45 to 64; and 13.6% were 65 years of age or older. The gender makeup of the village was 50.4% male and 49.6% female.

=== 2000 census ===
As of the census of 2000, there were 137 people, 53 households, and 41 families residing in the town. The population density was 680.9 inhabitants per square mile (262.9/km^{2}). There were 56 housing units at an average density of 278.3 per square mile (107.5/km^{2}). The racial makeup of the town was 98.54% White, and 1.46% from two or more races. Hispanic or Latino of any race were 0.73% of the population.

There were 53 households, out of which 32.1% had children under the age of 18 living with them, 62.3% were married couples living together, 9.4% had a female householder with no husband present, and 22.6% were non-families. 17.0% of all households were made up of individuals, and 3.8% had someone living alone who was 65 years of age or older. The average household size was 2.58, and the average family size was 2.88.

In the town, the population was spread out, with 27.7% under the age of 18, 7.3% from 18 to 24, 27.0% from 25 to 44, 28.5% from 45 to 64, and 9.5% who were 65 years of age or older. The median age was 36 years. For every 100 females, there were 117.5 males. For every 100 females age 18 and over, there were 102.0 males.

The median income for a household in the town was $21,750, and the median income for a family was $25,000. Males had a median income of $27,500 versus $13,750 for females. The per capita income for the town was $11,673. There were 13.3% of families and 18.9% of the population living below the poverty line, including 33.3% of under eighteens and 16.7% of those over 64.

== Legends and folklore ==
The legend of the “Avilla Phantom Bushwhacker” of the "Death Tree Legend", also known as "Rotten Johnny Reb", is an enduring Avilla ghost story describing various hauntings involving the ghost of a dead Confederate Bushwhacker whose remains were never properly buried, and an old tree charged with dark or evil energy after his skull was hung on it. According to one version of the legend, the phantom is not only searching for his head, but vengeance on the town citizens as well.
