= Pettis Creek =

Stream in the American state of Missouri

Coordinates: 37.436161°N 94.286337°W

Pettis Creek is a stream in Barton County in the U.S. state of Missouri.

Pettis Creek derives its name from Allen Perry, a local judge.

== See also ==
- List of rivers of Missouri
