= Oaktown =

Oaktown may refer to:

- Oaktown, Indiana, United States
- Oaktown or Oakland, California, United States
- Oaktown (Hambach Forest), a tree-house colony by environmental activists in the Hambach Forest, Germany

== See also ==
- Oakton (disambiguation)
