= Golden City Township, Barton County, Missouri =

Township in the US state of Missouri

Golden City Township
- Township
- Location in Barton County
- Coordinates: 37°24′01″N 094°06′00″W
- Country: United States
- State: Missouri
- County: Barton

Area
  - Total: 40.51 sq mi (104.92 km^{2})
  - Land: 40.5 sq mi (104.9 km^{2})
  - Water: 0.0077 sq mi (0.02 km^{2}) 0.02%
- Elevation: 1,024 ft (312 m)

Population (2000)
  - Total: 1,271
  - Density: 31/sq mi (12.1/km^{2})
- GNIS feature ID: 0766278

Golden City Township is a township in Barton County, Missouri, USA. As of the 2000 census, its population was 1,271.

== Geography ==
Golden City Township covers an area of 40.51 square miles (104.9 km^{2}). The township contains one incorporated settlement, Golden City, from which its name is derived. According to the USGS, it contains one cemetery, Harlow-Wright. However, there is another cemetery located in the township, the Golden City IOOF Cemetery, just north of Golden City.

The stream of Kyle Creek runs through this township.
