= Doylesport Township, Barton County, Missouri =

Township in the American state of Missouri

Doylesport Township
- Township
- Location in Barton County
- Coordinates: 37°35′07″N 094°14′19″W
- Country: United States
- State: Missouri
- County: Barton

Area
  - Total: 36.17 sq mi (93.69 km^{2})
  - Land: 35.88 sq mi (92.93 km^{2})
  - Water: 0.29 sq mi (0.76 km^{2}) 0.81%
- Elevation: 988 ft (301 m)

Population (2000)
  - Total: 245
  - Density: 6.7/sq mi (2.6/km^{2})
- GNIS feature ID: 0766277

Doylesport Township is a township in Barton County, Missouri, USA. As of the 2000 census, its population was 245.

Doylesport Township took its name from the community of Doylesport, Missouri.

== Geography ==
Doylesport Township covers an area of 36.18 square miles (93.7 km^{2}) and contains no incorporated settlements. According to the USGS, it contains one cemetery, Doylesport.
