= Elk Valley (Missouri) =

Valley in Missouri, United States

Elk Valley is a valley in Christian County in the Ozarks of southwest Missouri.

The headwater area of the valley and associated intermittent stream is located at 36°57′01″N 93°10′48″W and the confluence with Finley Creek is at 37°00′19″N 93°16′26″W. The confluence is at an elevation of 1,070 ft (330 m).

The source area for the valley stream lies about one mile northwest of the community of Christian Center and on the south edge of the Springfield Plateau. The stream flows northwest, crossing under U.S. Route 65 midway between Selmore and Ozark. The stream continues and passes under and parallels Missouri Route F reaching its confluence with Finley Creek about one mile northeast of Riverdale.

Elk Valley was named for the fact the valley was a hunting ground of elk by pioneers. The elk were hunted out in the 1880s.

Lead and zinc mines produced ore up until the 1920s. One mine in Ozark was reported to have produces as much as 180 tons of lead ore in or around 1904. The mines are still in the valley; some have shafts of 100 feet or more. There are at least seven mines in the Elk Valley area.
