= Leroy Township, Barton County, Missouri =

Township in the US state of Missouri

Leroy Township
- Township
- Location in Barton County
- Coordinates: 37°37′05″N 094°31′51″W
- Country: United States
- State: Missouri
- County: Barton

Area
  - Total: 40.44 sq mi (104.74 km^{2})
  - Land: 40.14 sq mi (103.95 km^{2})
  - Water: 0.31 sq mi (0.79 km^{2}) 0.75%
- Elevation: 843 ft (257 m)

Population (2000)
  - Total: 238
  - Density: 6.0/sq mi (2.3/km^{2})
- GNIS feature ID: 0766280

Leroy Township is a township in Barton County, Missouri, USA. As of the 2000 census, its population was 238.

The origin of the name Leroy is obscure.

== Geography ==
Leroy Township covers an area of 40.44 square miles (104.7 km^{2}) and contains no incorporated settlements. According to the USGS, it contains two cemeteries: Leroy and Shiloh.

The streams of Bitter Creek, East Fork Dry Wood Creek and West Elm Branch run through this township.
