= Northfork Township, Barton County, Missouri =

Township in the American state of Missouri

Northfork Township
- Township
- Location in Barton County
- Coordinates: 37°23′08″N 094°20′21″W
- Country: United States
- State: Missouri
- County: Barton

Area
  - Total: 33.1 sq mi (85.6 km^{2})
  - Land: 32.92 sq mi (85.27 km^{2})
  - Water: 0.13 sq mi (0.33 km^{2}) 0.39%
- Elevation: 935 ft (285 m)

Population (2000)
  - Total: 256
  - Density: 7.8/sq mi (3/km^{2})
- GNIS feature ID: 0766284

Northfork Township is a township in Barton County, Missouri, USA. As of the 2000 census, its population was 256.

The township takes its name from the North Fork of the Spring River.

== Geography ==
Northfork Township covers an area of 33.05 square miles (85.6 km^{2}) and contains no incorporated settlements. According to the USGS, it contains three cemeteries: Killey, Oak Grove and Waters.
