= Verdella, Missouri =

Unincorporated community in Missouri, U.S.

Coordinates: 37°36′23″N 94°26′19″W

Verdella is an unincorporated community in Barton County, in the U.S. state of Missouri.

== History ==
A post office called Verdella was established in 1880, and remained in operation until 1907. The origin of the name Verdella is uncertain.
