= Walter Stemmons =

Editor and historian of the University of Connecticut

Walter Campbell Stemmons
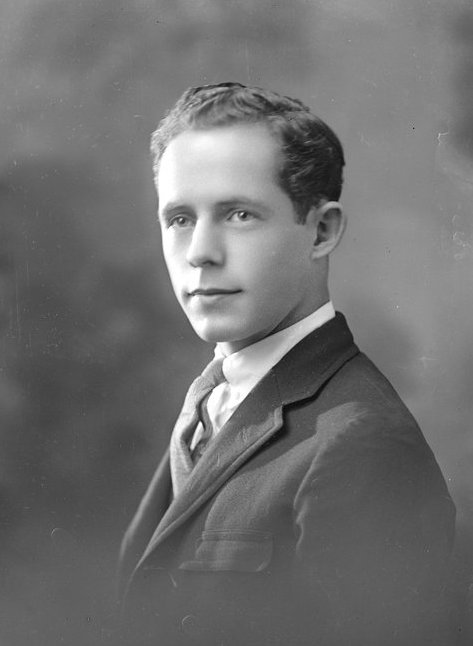
- Born: December 17, 1884; Avilla, Missouri
- Died: June 25, 1965 (aged 80); Mansfield, Connecticut
- Education: B.S. in journalism
- Alma mater: University of Missouri
- Occupations: Editor, journalist, professor
- Spouse: Lora Davis Stemmons
- Writing career
- Language: English
- Genres: History, university publications
- Notable work: Connecticut State College: A History (1931)

Walter Campbell Stemmons (1884–1965) was an American writer who served as Professor of Journalism and University Editor at the University of Connecticut from 1918 to 1954. He wrote Connecticut Agricultural College: A History (1931), published on the 50th anniversary of UConn's founding.

== Early life and career ==
Stemmons was born into a hardscrabble farming family in Avilla, Jasper County, Missouri, on December 17, 1884. In high school he freelanced as a reporter for Missouri's Carthage Democrat. He earned his Bachelor of Science degree in journalism from the Missouri School of Journalism in 1912. He was president of the school's first graduating class. He was managing editor of the News-Herald in Joplin, Missouri for a year after graduation.

Stemmons subsequently worked as publications editor for the Oklahoma Agricultural and Mechanical College in Stillwater, Oklahoma, from 1913 to 1918. He joined Connecticut Agricultural College (now the University of Connecticut) in October 1918 as agricultural publications editor.

== University of Connecticut ==
During his thirty-six years of service at UConn, Stemmons rose to become Director of the Division of Publications and University Editor. He oversaw all the university's publications, including the course catalog, Experiment Station bulletins, and press releases. He also served as faculty advisor and confidant to generations of student editors of the Daily Campus and the Nutmeg yearbook. Students affectionately nicknamed him "Stemmie," "the Boss," or "the Little Deacon" and compared him to Mr. Chips. He shielded them from administrative ire, mentored them, and kept them entertained with his sardonic humor. In 1918, when most male students were serving in the military during the First World War, Stemmons oversaw the Daily Campus's first all-woman editorial staff and first woman editor, Helen Clark. At his retirement ceremony in November 1953, forty-eight out of fifty-three former Daily Campus editors came together to honor him. Stemmons also taught a newswriting class from 1927 to 1950.

With UConn history instructor André Schenker, Stemmons authored Connecticut Agricultural College: A History (1931), sponsored and published by the university on the fiftieth anniversary of its founding. Historian Bruce M. Stave in 2006 described the book as "a useful and detailed account of the college's first fifty years." Stemmons struggled with the writing process, as he was uncomfortable writing about living people and felt his skills as a historian to be inadequate. He completed graduate seminars in journalism at the University of Wisconsin in 1932 and in history at Yale University in 1930. His Yale instructor, Ralph Henry Gabriel, wrote the foreword for Connecticut Agricultural College. Stemmons also composed a "dairy play," And Thou, which premiered at UConn in 1932 and was "designed to put across the footlights certain fundamental principles of the dairy industry in Connecticut." It was one of several agriculturally themed plays he composed on behalf of the university. In 1954 he received UConn's Athletic Medallion in recognition of distinguished service to athletics. Stemmons had served on the faculty advisory committee for athletics for a decade prior to his retirement.

Stemmons retired in 1954. Throughout his career he had been an in-demand public speaker and was known throughout the state for his sardonic wit, tendency to rabble-rouse, and wide social circle. His hobbies included golfing and fishing. In 1971, the Hartford Courant described him as "one of the saltiest and best-loved characters who ever graced the campus at Storrs."

== Later years ==
Following retirement, Stemmons continued to live in Mansfield and pursued an active social and intellectual life. He researched and wrote several chapters in a sequel to his 1931 history of the university, though the work was unfinished at the time of his death and was never completed. He served as vice chair of Republican Party town committee of Mansfield from 1958 to 1959.

Stemmons died after a long illness at the Natchaug Hospital in Mansfield on June 25, 1965. He was 80 years old. He is interred in Storrs Cemetery, on a hill overlooking campus.

Stemmons was survived by his wife of many years, Lora Davis Stemmons (1883–1977), and their two sons, Ralph and Robert.

Stemmons' papers, including his unfinished book manuscript, are held at the UConn Archives and Special Collections.
