= Dorris Creek =

Stream in the American state of Missouri

Coordinates: 37.4289389°N 94.2660582°W

Dorris Creek is a stream in Barton County in the U.S. state of Missouri.

Dorris Creek has the name of the local Dorris family which settled there.

== See also ==
- List of rivers of Missouri
