= Nashville Township, Barton County, Missouri =

Township in the American state of Missouri

Nashville Township
- Township
- Location in Barton County
- Coordinates: 37°24′10″N 094°28′10″W
- Country: United States
- State: Missouri
- County: Barton

Area
  - Total: 48.60 sq mi (125.87 km^{2})
  - Land: 48.48 sq mi (125.55 km^{2})
  - Water: 0.12 sq mi (0.32 km^{2}) 0.25%
- Elevation: 958 ft (292 m)

Population (2000)
  - Total: 396
  - Density: 8.3/sq mi (3.2/km^{2})
- GNIS feature ID: 0766282

Nashville Township is a township in Barton County, Missouri, USA. As of the 2000 census, its population was 396.

Nashville Township takes its name from Nashville, Tennessee. Laid out by Thomas and Squire Baker on January 28, 1869

== Geography ==
Nashville Township covers an area of 48.6 square miles (126 km^{2}) and contains no incorporated settlements. According to the USGS, it contains two cemeteries: Pierce and Shapley.
