= Kenoma, Missouri =

Unincorporated community in Missouri, U.S.

Coordinates: 37°26′22″N 94°11′51″W

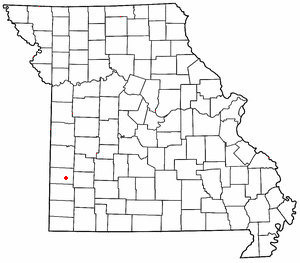

Kenoma is an unincorporated community in Barton County, Missouri, United States. It is located six miles southeast of Lamar.

== History ==
The community was founded in 1880. The origin of the name Kenoma is obscure. A post office called Kenoma was established in 1881, and remained in operation until 1980.
