= Emily Bushnell =

American psychologist

Emily W. Bushnell (born 1950) is an American psychologist and emeritus professor of psychology at Tufts University in Medford, Massachusetts, USA. Her areas of professional interest include child development, infant perception, haptic perception and acquisition of perceptual-motor skills. Professor Bushnell received her Ph.D. in Developmental Psychology from the University of Minnesota in 1979 and a BA in psychology from Swarthmore College in 1972. She served as chair of the Tufts Psychology Department from 1993 to 1996 and sat on the editorial board of the journal Child Development.

== Representative publications ==
- Bushnell, E. W., and Boudreau, J. P. (1998) "Exploring and exploiting objects with the hands during infancy" in K. Connolly (Ed.), The Psychobiology of the Hand, pp. 144–161, Cambridge, UK: Mac Keith Press.
- Bushnell, E. W., and Baxt, C. (1999) "Children’s haptic and cross-modal recognition with familiar and unfamiliar objects", Journal of Experimental Psychology: Human Perception and Performance, 25, pp. 1867–1881.
- Roder, B. J., Bushnell, E. W., and Sasseville, A. M. (2000). "Infants preferences for familiarity and novelty during the course of visual processing", Infancy, 1, pp. 491–507.
- Striano, T., and Bushnell, E. W. (2005). "Haptic perception of material properties by 3-month-old infants", Infant Behavior and Development, 28, pp. 266–289.
