= Oskaloosa, Missouri =

Unincorporated community in Missouri, U.S.

Coordinates: 37°38′21″N 94°35′33″W

Oskaloosa is an unincorporated community in northwest Barton County, in the U.S. state of Missouri.

The community is one mile east of the Missouri-Kansas border. The town of Arcadia, Kansas lies adjacent to the border in Kansas. Missouri Route K passes just north of the community and Dry Wood Creek flows past one mile to the east.

== History ==
A post office called Oskaloosa was established in 1894, and remained in operation until 1953. The community was named after Oskaloosa, Iowa, the native home of a share of the first settlers.
