= Central Township, Barton County, Missouri =

Township in the American state of Missouri

Central Township
- Township
- Location in Barton County
- Coordinates: 37°31′08″N 094°27′55″W
- Country: United States
- State: Missouri
- County: Barton

Area
  - Total: 54.49 sq mi (141.13 km^{2})
  - Land: 54.34 sq mi (140.75 km^{2})
  - Water: 0.15 sq mi (0.38 km^{2}) 0.27%
- Elevation: 938 ft (286 m)

Population (2000)
  - Total: 512
  - Density: 9.3/sq mi (3.6/km^{2})
- GNIS feature ID: 0766275

Central Township is a township in Barton County, Missouri, USA. As of the 2000 census, its population was 512.

The township was named for its location near the geographical center of Barton County.

== Geography ==
Central Township covers an area of 54.49 square miles (141.1 km^{2}) and contains no incorporated settlements. According to the USGS, it contains one cemetery, Iantha.
