= Esrom, Missouri =

Unincorporated community in Missouri, U.S.

Coordinates: 37°24′48″N 94°19′40″W

Esrom is an unincorporated community in Barton County, in the U.S. state of Missouri.

== History ==
A post office called Esrom was established in 1880, and remained in operation until 1904. The name Esrom appears to be biblical in origin.
