= Bushnell, Missouri =

Unincorporated community in Missouri, U.S.

Coordinates: 37°29′49″N 94°09′04″W

Bushnell is an unincorporated community in Barton County, in the U.S. state of Missouri.

== History ==
A post office called Bushnell was established in 1888, and remained in operation until 1901. The community was named after its founder, Andy Bushnell.
