= Dennis M. Bushnell =

NASA scientist

- Born: May 10, 1941; New Haven, Connecticut, U.S.
- Died: October 20, 2025 (aged 84)
- Education: University of Connecticut (BS, 1963); University of Virginia (MS, 1967)
- Known for: Viscous flow modeling and control Turbulent drag reduction Hypersonic flight technology
- Awards: NASA Exceptional Scientific Achievement Medal; NASA Outstanding Leadership Medal; AIAA Lawrence Sperry Award (1975); AIAA Fluid and Plasma Dynamics Award (1991)

Dennis M. Bushnell (May 10, 1941 – October 20, 2025) was a NASA scientist and lecturer who retired in 2023 after 60 years of service to NASA. As chief scientist at NASA Langley Research Center for more than two decades, he was responsible for technical oversight and advanced program formulation. His work focused mainly on new approaches to environmental issues, in particular to climate issues. Bushnell has received numerous awards for his work. Bushnell has promoted research at NASA into LENR (low energy nuclear reactions, or cold fusion).

In 1998, Bushnell was elected a member of the National Academy of Engineering for viscous flow modeling and control, turbulent drag reduction, and advanced aeronautical concepts.

== Education ==
Bushnell obtained his M.E. degree from the University of Connecticut in 1963 and his M.S. degree from the University of Virginia in 1967, both in the field of Mechanical Engineering.

== Publications ==
Future Strategic Issues/Future Warfare [Circa 2025]

== Bibliography ==
- Dennis M. Bushnell, Marie H. Tuttle (1979). Survey and bibliography on attainment of laminar flow control in air using pressure gradient and suction. NASA, Scientific and Technical Information Branch.
