= Hannon, Missouri =

Unincorporated community in Missouri, U.S.

Coordinates: 37°37′21″N 94°29′39″W

Hannon, formerly known as Barton City) is an unincorporated community in Barton County, in the U.S. state of Missouri.

== History ==
The Hannon post office operated from 1890 until 1953. The community was most likely named after the local Hannon family.
