= White Oak Branch =

Stream in the American state of Missouri

Coordinates: 39.095178°N 91.847763°W

White Oak Branch is a stream in Audrain County in the U.S. state of Missouri. It is a tributary of the South Fork of the Salt River.

White Oak Branch was named for the white oak trees along its course.

== See also ==
- List of rivers of Missouri
