= Newport, Missouri =

Unincorporated community in Missouri, U.S.

Coordinates: 37°31′40″N 94°06′16″W

Newport is an unincorporated community in Barton County, in the U.S. state of Missouri.

== History ==
Newport was platted in 1874. A variant name was Horse Creek. A post office called Horse Creek was established in 1858, the name was changed to Newport in 1878, and the post office closed in 1915.
