= Bank of Carthage (Missouri) =

Coordinates: 37°10′36.82″N 94°18′39.91″W

- Industry: Financial services
- Founded: 1868; 158 years ago in Missouri, United States
- Defunct: 1960
- Fate: Absorbed into Boatmen's Bank
- Successors: Boatmen's Bank, Bank of America

The Bank of Carthage was a local bank in Carthage, Missouri. It traced its history to 1868 and called itself the "oldest bank in southwest Missouri."

The Bank of Carthage was a successful business for many decades, surviving the Great Depression with minimal disruption due to its conservative policies. It occupied an historic building on Main Street in Carthage from 1882 until 1960, when it relocated to a more modern facility.

After 1960 the company was absorbed into Boatmen's Bank and subsequently Bank of America.
