= Mindenmines, Missouri =

- City
- Location of Mindenmines, Missouri
- Coordinates: 37°28′22″N 94°35′20″W
- Country: United States
- State: Missouri
- County: Barton

Area
  - Total: 3.79 sq mi (9.82 km^{2})
  - Land: 3.65 sq mi (9.45 km^{2})
  - Water: 0.15 sq mi (0.38 km^{2})
- Elevation: 971 ft (296 m)

Population (2020)
  - Total: 271
  - Density: 74.3/sq mi (28.69/km^{2})
- Time zone: UTC-6 (Central (CST))
  - Summer (DST): UTC-5 (CDT)
- ZIP code: 64769
- Area code: 417
- FIPS code: 29-48566
- GNIS feature ID: 2395342

Mindenmines is a city in Barton County, Missouri, United States. The population was 271 at the 2020 census. The city lies approximately four miles east of Frontenac, Kansas. It has possessed a post office since 1883. It is also the home of the Bank of Minden. (named Tusconia 1883–1884, Minden Mines 1884–1895, and Mindenmines since 1895).

== Geography ==
Mindenmines is located in western Barton County on US Route 160 16 miles west of Lamar. The Missouri-Kansas border lies 1.5 miles to the west.

According to the United States Census Bureau, the city has a total area of 3.80 square miles (9.84 km^{2}), of which 3.65 square miles (9.45 km^{2}) is land and 0.15 square miles (0.39 km^{2}) is water.

== Demographics ==
Historical population
Census	Pop.	Note	%±
1890	219		—
1900	335		53.0%
1910	591		76.4%
1920	924		56.3%
1930	787		−14.8%
1940	550		−30.1%
1950	425		−22.7%
1960	356		−16.2%
1970	279		−21.6%
1980	318		14.0%
1990	346		8.8%
2000	409		18.2%
2010	365		−10.8%
2020	271		−25.8%
U.S. Decennial Census

=== 2010 census ===
As of the census of 2010, there were 365 people, 133 households, and 95 families residing in the city. The population density was 100.0 inhabitants per square mile (38.6/km^{2}). There were 167 housing units at an average density of 45.8 per square mile (17.7/km^{2}). The racial makeup of the city was 86.3% White, 6.6% Native American, 0.3% Asian, 0.8% from other races, and 6.0% from two or more races. Hispanic or Latino of any race were 0.8% of the population.

There were 133 households, of which 35.3% had children under the age of 18 living with them, 53.4% were married couples living together, 14.3% had a female householder with no husband present, 3.8% had a male householder with no wife present, and 28.6% were non-families. 23.3% of all households were made up of individuals, and 9.1% had someone living alone who was 65 years of age or older. The average household size was 2.74 and the average family size was 3.25.

The median age in the city was 37.1 years. 27.4% of residents were under the age of 18; 9.2% were between the ages of 18 and 24; 23.5% were from 25 to 44; 28% were from 45 to 64; and 11.8% were 65 years of age or older. The gender makeup of the city was 45.8% male and 54.2% female.

=== 2000 census ===
As of the census of 2000, there were 409 people, 149 households, and 101 families residing in the city. The population density was 108.3 inhabitants per square mile (41.8/km^{2}). There were 175 housing units at an average density of 46.4 per square mile (17.9/km^{2}). The racial makeup of the city was 97.31% White, 1.71% Native American, and 0.98% from two or more races. Hispanic or Latino of any race were 0.49% of the population.

There were 149 households, out of which 38.3% had children under the age of 18 living with them, 55.7% were married couples living together, 8.1% had a female householder with no husband present, and 32.2% were non-families. 26.8% of all households were made up of individuals, and 13.4% had someone living alone who was 65 years of age or older. The average household size was 2.74 and the average family size was 3.35.

In the city the population was spread out, with 32.3% under the age of 18, 9.5% from 18 to 24, 24.7% from 25 to 44, 20.5% from 45 to 64, and 13.0% who were 65 years of age or older. The median age was 32 years. For every 100 females, there were 99.5 males. For every 100 females age 18 and over, there were 99.3 males.

The median income for a household in the city was $22,125, and the median income for a family was $31,406. Males had a median income of $23,393 versus $16,094 for females. The per capita income for the city was $9,560. About 14.9% of families and 15.6% of the population were below the poverty line, including 9.5% of those under age 18 and 32.1% of those age 65 or over.

== History ==
The town was laid out by Captain J. R. Tucker, March 19, 1883 and named Minden. But only a year later the name was changed to Mindenmines (spelled Minden Mines from 1884 to 1895) because the mail got mixed up with that of Mendon, Missouri. The suffix was added because the chief occupation of the local inhabitants was coal mining.

== Education ==
The school district is Liberal R-II School District.
