= Milford, Missouri =

- Village
- Location of Milford, Missouri
- Coordinates: 37°35′11″N 94°09′29″W
- Country: United States
- State: Missouri
- County: Barton

Area
  - Total: 0.042 sq mi (0.11 km^{2})
  - Land: 0.042 sq mi (0.11 km^{2})
  - Water: 0 sq mi (0.00 km^{2})
- Elevation: 922 ft (281 m)

Population (2020)
  - Total: 24
  - Density: 574.4/sq mi (221.79/km^{2})
- Time zone: UTC-6 (Central (CST))
  - Summer (DST): UTC-5 (CDT)
- ZIP code: 64766
- Area code: 417
- FIPS code: 29-48098
- GNIS feature ID: 2399345

Milford is a village in Barton County, Missouri, United States. The population was 24 at the 2020 census.

== History ==
Milford was platted in 1869. The village was named after Charles Milford Wilcox, its founder. A post office was established at Milford in 1869.

== Geography ==
According to the United States Census Bureau, the village has a total area of 0.04 square miles (0.10 km^{2}), all land.

== Demographics ==
Historical population
Census	Pop.	Note	%±
1890	145		—
1970	23		—
1980	67		191.3%
1990	22		−67.2%
2000	52		136.4%
2010	26		−50.0%
2020	24		−7.7%
U.S. Decennial Census

=== 2010 census ===
As of the census of 2010, there were 26 people, 14 households, and 7 families living in the village. The population density was 650.0 inhabitants per square mile (251.0/km^{2}). There were 23 housing units at an average density of 575.0 per square mile (222.0/km^{2}). The racial makeup of the village was 100.0% White.

There were 14 households, of which 21.4% had children under the age of 18 living with them, 35.7% were married couples living together, 7.1% had a female householder with no husband present, 7.1% had a male householder with no wife present, and 50.0% were non-families. 50.0% of all households were made up of individuals, and 28.5% had someone living alone who was 65 years of age or older. The average household size was 1.86 and the average family size was 2.57.

The median age in the village was 55.5 years. 11.5% of residents were under the age of 18; 3.8% were between the ages of 18 and 24; 15.3% were from 25 to 44; 38.3% were from 45 to 64; and 30.8% were 65 years of age or older. The gender makeup of the village was 50.0% male and 50.0% female.

=== 2000 census ===
As of the census of 2000, there were 52 people, 20 households, and 15 families living in the village. The population density was 1,288.2 inhabitants per square mile (497.4/km^{2}). There were 26 housing units at an average density of 644.1 per square mile (248.7/km^{2}). The racial makeup of the village was 98.08% White, and 1.92% from two or more races.

There were 20 households, out of which 25.0% had children under the age of 18 living with them, 55.0% were married couples living together, 15.0% had a female householder with no husband present, and 25.0% were non-families. 15.0% of all households were made up of individuals, and 5.0% had someone living alone who was 65 years of age or older. The average household size was 2.60 and the average family size was 2.87.

In the village, the population was spread out, with 23.1% under the age of 18, 13.5% from 18 to 24, 23.1% from 25 to 44, 26.9% from 45 to 64, and 13.5% who were 65 years of age or older. The median age was 40 years. For every 100 females, there were 92.6 males. For every 100 females age 18 and over, there were 110.5 males.

The median income for a household in the village was $26,875, and the median income for a family was $19,167. Males had a median income of $22,917 versus $16,250 for females. The per capita income for the village was $12,303. There were 28.6% of families and 20.0% of the population living below the poverty line, including 33.3% of under eighteens and none of those over 64.
