= Christian Center, Missouri =

Unincorporated community in Missouri, U.S.

Coordinates: 36°56′27″N 93°10′01″W

Christian Center is an unincorporated community in Christian County in the Ozarks of southwest Missouri, United States.

The community is located on Missouri Route W on the edge of the Springfield Plateau, at an elevation of 1,388 ft (423 m). Highlandville is approximately three miles west on U.S. Route 65 and Ozark is about six miles to the north-northwest. To the east and south lie the rugged topography of Bull Creek and a section of the Mark Twain National Forest.
