= Oakton, Missouri =

Unincorporated community in Missouri, U.S.

Coordinates: 37°27′29″N 94°21′15″W

Oakton is an unincorporated community in Barton County, in the U.S. state of Missouri.

== History ==
A post office called Oakton was established in 1897, and remained in operation until 1901. The community was named for oak trees near the original town site.
