= Lamar Heights, Missouri =

- City
- Location of Lamar Heights, Missouri
- Coordinates: 37°29′38″N 94°17′43″W
- Country: United States
- State: Missouri
- County: Barton
- Incorporated: 1951

Area
  - Total: 0.80 sq mi (2.08 km^{2})
  - Land: 0.78 sq mi (2.03 km^{2})
  - Water: 0.019 sq mi (0.05 km^{2})
- Elevation: 955 ft (291 m)

Population (2020)
  - Total: 170
  - Density: 217/sq mi (83.8/km^{2})
- Time zone: UTC-6 (Central (CST))
  - Summer (DST): UTC-5 (CDT)
- FIPS code: 29-40430
- GNIS feature ID: 2395618

Lamar Heights is a city in Barton County, Missouri, United States. The population was 170 at the 2020 census.

== Geography ==
According to the United States Census Bureau, the city has a total area of 0.80 square miles (2.07 km^{2}), of which 0.78 square miles (2.02 km^{2}) is land and 0.02 square miles (0.05 km^{2}) is water.

== Demographics ==
Historical population
Census	Pop.	Note	%±
1960	113		—
1970	96		−15.0%
1980	171		78.1%
1990	176		2.9%
2000	216		22.7%
2010	178		−17.6%
2020	170		−4.5%
U.S. Decennial Census

=== 2010 census ===
As of the census of 2010, there were 178 people, 79 households, and 47 families living in the city. The population density was 228.2 inhabitants per square mile (88.1/km^{2}). There were 90 housing units at an average density of 115.4 per square mile (44.6/km^{2}). The racial makeup of the city was 98.9% White and 1.1% from two or more races. Hispanic or Latino of any race were 1.1% of the population.

There were 79 households, of which 29.1% had children under the age of 18 living with them, 51.9% were married couples living together, 2.5% had a female householder with no husband present, 5.1% had a male householder with no wife present, and 40.5% were non-families. 38.0% of all households were made up of individuals, and 12.7% had someone living alone who was 65 years of age or older. The average household size was 2.25 and the average family size was 2.98.

The median age in the city was 45 years. 23% of residents were under the age of 18; 4.5% were between the ages of 18 and 24; 22.5% were from 25 to 44; 34.3% were from 45 to 64; and 15.7% were 65 years of age or older. The gender makeup of the city was 47.8% male and 52.2% female.

=== 2000 census ===
As of the census of 2000, there were 216 people, 89 households, and 59 families living in the village. The population density was 269.1 inhabitants per square mile (103.9/km^{2}). There were 102 housing units at an average density of 127.1 per square mile (49.1/km^{2}). The racial makeup of the village was 94.91% White, 0.46% Native American, 0.93% Asian, and 3.70% from two or more races. Hispanic or Latino of any race were 1.39% of the population.

There were 89 households, out of which 30.3% had children under the age of 18 living with them, 52.8% were married couples living together, 9.0% had a female householder with no husband present, and 32.6% were non-families. 29.2% of all households were made up of individuals, and 7.9% had someone living alone who was 65 years of age or older. The average household size was 2.43 and the average family size was 2.92.

In the village, the population was spread out, with 27.3% under the age of 18, 11.6% from 18 to 24, 25.0% from 25 to 44, 22.2% from 45 to 64, and 13.9% who were 65 years of age or older. The median age was 38 years. For every 100 females, there were 107.7 males. For every 100 females age 18 and over, there were 96.3 males.

The median income for a household in the village was $30,625, and the median income for a family was $36,389. Males had a median income of $25,000 versus $21,000 for females. The per capita income for the village was $16,018. About 18.6% of families and 18.3% of the population were below the poverty line, including 28.1% of those under the age of eighteen and none of those 65 or over.
