= Selmore, Missouri =

Unincorporated community in Missouri, U.S.

Coordinates: 36°58′05″N 93°13′49″W

Selmore is an unincorporated community in Christian County, in the U.S. state of Missouri.

== History ==
A post office called Selmore was established in 1892, and remained in operation until 1915. According to tradition, the community was named for a local merchant's vow to "sell more" wares than his competitor.
