= Barton County, Missouri =

County in Missouri, United States

- County
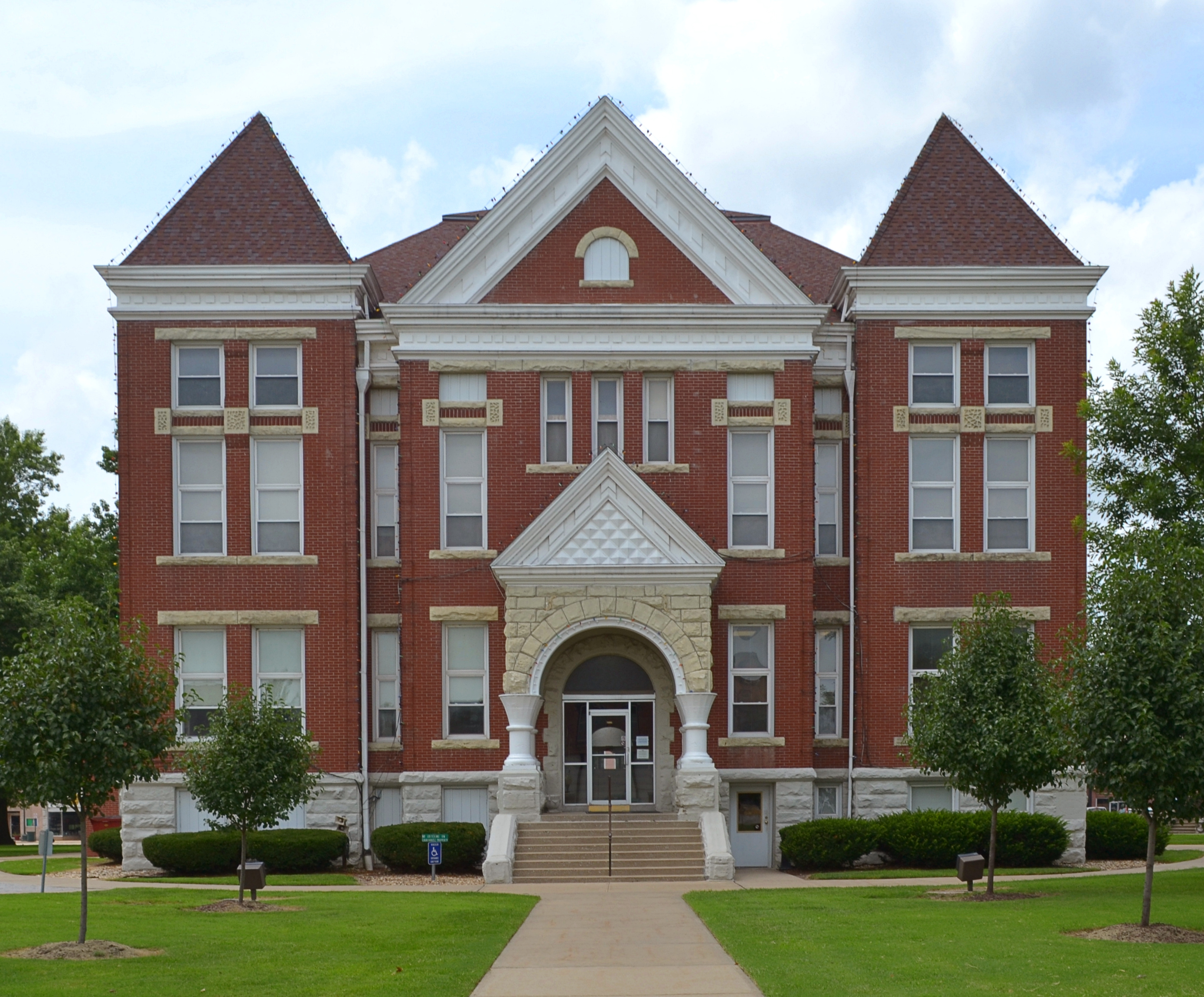
- Barton County Courthouse in Lamar

- Location within the U.S. state of Missouri
- Coordinates: 37°30′N 94°20′W
- Country: United States
- State: Missouri
- Founded: December 12, 1855
- Named for: David Barton
- Seat: Lamar
- Largest city: Lamar

Area
  - Total: 597 sq mi (1,550 km^{2})
  - Land: 592 sq mi (1,530 km^{2})
  - Water: 4.8 sq mi (12 km^{2}) 0.8%

Population (2020)
  - Total: 11,637
  - Estimate (2025): 11,795 ▲
  - Density: 19.8/sq mi (7.6/km^{2})
- Time zone: UTC−6 (Central)
  - Summer (DST): UTC−5 (CDT)
- Congressional district: 4th
- Website: countyofbarton.gov

Barton County is a county located in the southwestern part of the U.S. state of Missouri. As of the 2020 census, the population was 11,637. Its county seat is Lamar. The county was organized in 1855 and named after U.S. Senator David Barton from Missouri.

President Harry S. Truman was born in Barton County in 1884. The female bandit, Little Britches, was born in Barton County in 1879.

== Geography ==
According to the U.S. Census Bureau, the county has a total area of 597 square miles (1,550 km^{2}), of which 592 square miles (1,530 km^{2}) is land and 4.8 square miles (12 km^{2}) (0.8%) is water.

=== Adjacent counties ===
- Vernon County (north)
- Cedar County (northeast)
- Dade County (east)
- Jasper County (south)
- Crawford County, Kansas (west)

=== Major highways ===
- Interstate 49
- U.S. Route 71
- U.S. Route 160
- Route 37
- Route 43
- Route 126

=== Airport ===
Lamar Municipal Airport (LLU) serves the county and surrounding communities.

== Demographics ==
Historical population
Census	Pop.	Note	%±
1860	1,817		—
1870	4,285		135.8%
1880	10,332		141.1%
1890	18,504		79.1%
1900	18,253		−1.4%
1910	16,747		−8.3%
1920	16,879		0.8%
1930	14,560		−13.7%
1940	14,148		−2.8%
1950	12,678		−10.4%
1960	11,113		−12.3%
1970	10,431		−6.1%
1980	11,292		8.3%
1990	11,312		0.2%
2000	12,541		10.9%
2010	12,402		−1.1%
2020	11,637		−6.2%
2025 (est.)	11,795	▲	1.4%
U.S. Decennial Census; 1790-1960 1900-1990; 1990-2000 2010-2020

=== Racial and ethnic composition ===
Barton County, Missouri – Racial and ethnic composition Note: the US Census treats Hispanic/Latino as an ethnic category. This table excludes Latinos from the racial categories and assigns them to a separate category. Hispanics/Latinos may be of any race.
Race / Ethnicity (NH = Non-Hispanic)	Pop 1980	Pop 1990	Pop 2000	Pop 2010	Pop 2020	% 1980	% 1990	% 2000	% 2010	% 2020
White alone (NH)	11,188	11,113	12,078	11,704	10,367	99.08%	98.24%	96.31%	94.37%	89.09%
Black or African American alone (NH)	2	11	36	42	27	0.02%	0.10%	0.29%	0.34%	0.23%
Native American or Alaska Native alone (NH)	45	102	97	129	145	0.40%	0.90%	0.77%	1.04%	1.25%
Asian alone (NH)	15	28	30	29	37	0.13%	0.25%	0.24%	0.23%	0.32%
Native Hawaiian or Pacific Islander alone (NH)	x	x	12	2	2	x	x	0.10%	0.02%	0.02%
Other race alone (NH)	1	1	2	4	15	0.01%	0.01%	0.02%	0.03%	0.13%
Mixed race or Multiracial (NH)	x	x	167	261	778	x	x	1.33%	2.10%	6.69%
Hispanic or Latino (any race)	41	57	119	231	266	0.36%	0.50%	0.95%	1.86%	2.29%
Total	11,292	11,312	12,541	12,402	11,637	100.00%	100.00%	100.00%	100.00%	100.00%

=== 2020 Census ===
As of the 2020 census, the county had a population of 11,637 and a median age of 41.1 years. 24.6% of residents were under the age of 18 and 19.8% of residents were 65 years of age or older. For every 100 females there were 99.6 males, and for every 100 females age 18 and over there were 96.3 males. 0.0% of residents lived in urban areas, while 100.0% lived in rural areas.

The racial makeup of the county was 89.9% White, 0.3% Black or African American, 1.3% American Indian and Alaska Native, 0.3% Asian, 0.0% Native Hawaiian and Pacific Islander, 0.9% from some other race, and 7.3% from two or more races. Hispanic or Latino residents of any race comprised 2.3% of the population.

There were 4,702 households in the county, of which 29.0% had children under the age of 18 living with them and 23.8% had a female householder with no spouse or partner present. About 28.3% of all households were made up of individuals and 14.3% had someone living alone who was 65 years of age or older. There were 5,290 housing units, of which 11.1% were vacant. Among occupied housing units, 70.2% were owner-occupied and 29.8% were renter-occupied. The homeowner vacancy rate was 2.0% and the rental vacancy rate was 4.8%.

=== 2000 census ===
As of the census of 2000, there were 12,541 people, 4,895 households, and 3,441 families residing in the county. The population density was 21 people per square mile (8.1 people/km^{2}). There were 5,409 housing units at an average density of 9 units per square mile (3.5/km^{2}). The racial makeup of the county was 96.93% White, 0.29% Black or African American, 0.83% Native American, 0.28% Asian, 0.10% Pacific Islander, 0.14% from other races, and 1.44% from two or more races. 0.95% of the population were Hispanic or Latino of any race.

There were 4,895 households, out of which 34.00% had children under the age of 18 living with them, 58.10% were married couples living together, 8.50% had a female householder with no husband present, and 29.70% were non-families. 26.40% of all households were made up of individuals, and 13.30% had someone living alone who was 65 years of age or older. The average household size was 2.53 and the average family size was 3.04.

In the county, the population was spread out, with 27.50% under the age of 18, 8.30% from 18 to 24, 26.10% from 25 to 44, 21.70% from 45 to 64, and 16.50% who were 65 years of age or older. The median age was 37 years. For every 100 females there were 96.00 males. For every 100 females age 18 and over, there were 92.40 males.

The median income for a household in the county was $29,275, and the median income for a family was $35,638. Males had a median income of $25,254 versus $19,663 for females. The per capita income for the county was $13,987. About 11.00% of families and 13.00% of the population were below the poverty line, including 13.90% of those under age 18 and 16.80% of those age 65 or over.

=== Religion ===
According to the Association of Religion Data Archives County Membership Report (2010), Barton County is regarded as a part of the Bible Belt, with evangelical Protestantism being the most predominant religion. The most predominant denominations among residents in Barton County who adhere to a religion are Southern Baptists (29.18%), United Methodists (26.59%), and Christian Churches and Churches of Christ (12.96%).

== Education ==
School districts covering portions of the county, including those with administrative offices and/or schools in other counties, include:

- Bronaugh R-VII School District
- Golden City R-III School District
- Jasper County R-V School District
- Lamar R-I School District
- Liberal R-II School District
- Sheldon R-VIII School District

=== Public schools ===
- Liberal R-II School District - Liberal
  - Liberal Elementary School (PK-05)
  - Liberal Middle School (06-08)
  - Liberal High School (09-12)
- Lamar R-I School District - Lamar
  - Lamar East Primary School (K-02)
  - Lamar Elementary School (03-05)
  - Lamar Middle School (06-08)
  - Lamar High School (09-12)
- Golden City R-III School District - Golden City
  - Golden City Elementary School (PK-06)
  - Golden City High School (07-12)

=== Public libraries ===
- Barton County Library
- Sheldon City Library

== Communities ==
=== Cities ===
- Golden City
- Lamar (county seat)
- Liberal
- Mindenmines

=== Villages ===
- Burgess
- Lamar Heights
- Milford

=== Census-designated place ===
- Iantha
- Irwin

=== Other unincorporated places ===
- Boston
- Bushnell
- Doylesport
- Dublin
- Esrom
- Hannon
- Kenoma
- Nashville
- Newport
- Oakton
- Oskaloosa
- Verdella

=== Townships ===
Barton County is divided into fifteen townships:

- Barton City
- Central
- City (consolidated with the city of Lamar)
- Doylesport
- Golden City
- Lamar (township)
- Leroy
- Milford
- Nashville
- Newport
- Northfork
- Ozark
- Richland
- South West
- Union

== Notable people ==
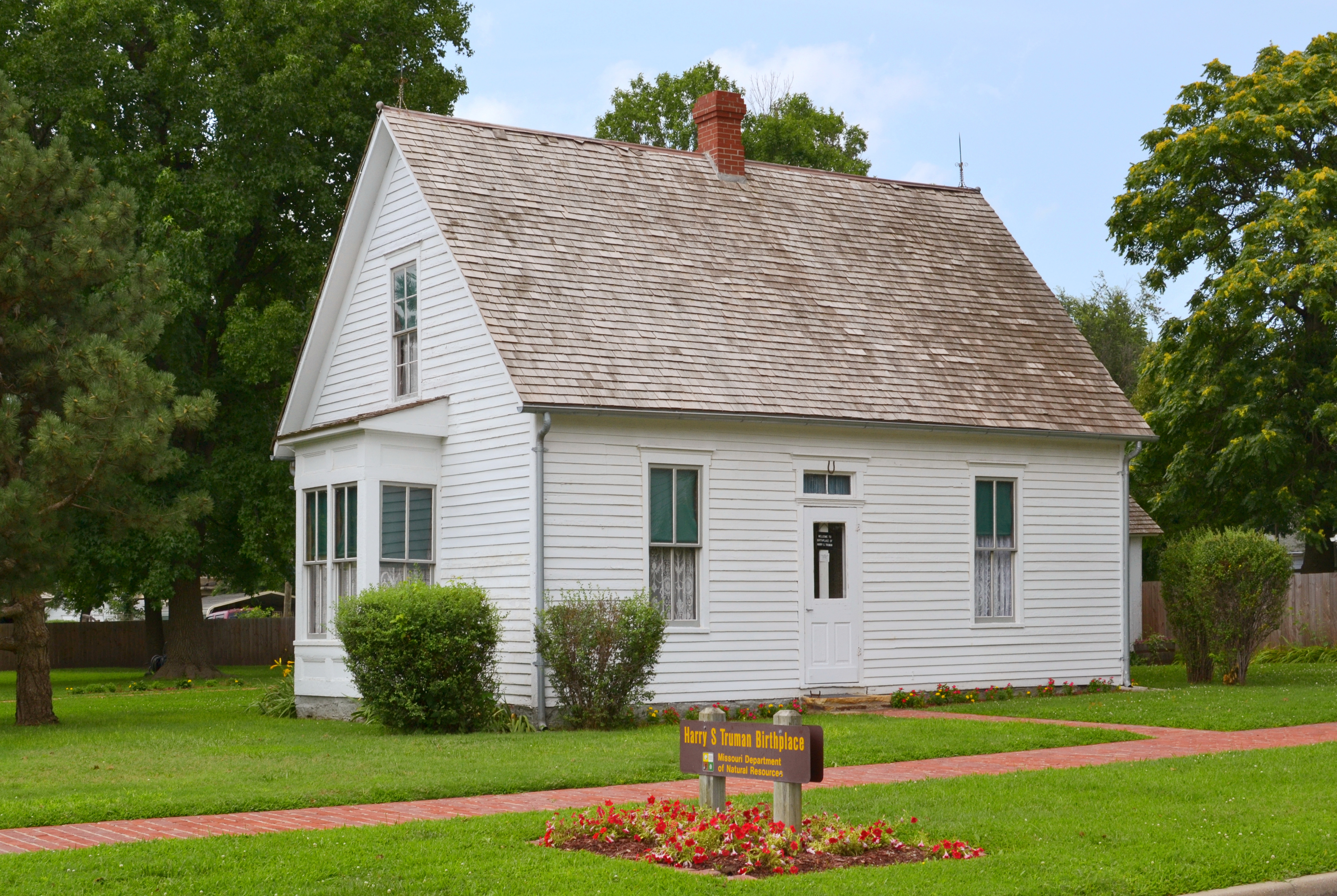
Birthplace of Harry S. Truman in Lamar

- Blaine Durbin — Major League Baseball player with Chicago Cubs, Cincinnati Reds and Pittsburgh Pirates in early 20th century
- Wyatt Earp and family — famous frontier lawman
- Bob Harmon, Major League Baseball player with St. Louis Cardinals and Pittsburgh Pirates in early 20th century
- Charles Henry Morgan — U.S. Representative from Missouri as both a Democrat (1875–79, 1883–85) and a Republican (1909–11)
- Harry S. Truman — 33rd President of the United States (1945–1953); 34th Vice President of the United States (1945-1945), became president upon death of Franklin Delano Roosevelt in 1945; U.S. Senator (D-Missouri) (1935-1945)

== Politics ==
=== Local ===
Republicans control politics at the local level in Barton County, holding all of the elected positions in the county.

Barton County, Missouri

Elected countywide officials
Assessor	Chad Johnson	Republican
Circuit Clerk	Melinda Maberry	Republican
County Clerk	Nikki Brand	Republican
Collector	Brittanica Born	Republican
Commissioner (presiding)	David Johnson	Republican
Commissioner (district 1)	Ben Reed	Republican
Commissioner (district 2)	Jeff Tucker	Republican
Coroner	Jenny Mcmanis	Republican
Prosecuting Attorney	Mike Smalley	Republican
Public Administrator	Julie Hagen	Republican
Recorder	Lisa Cunningham	Republican
Sheriff	John Simpson	Republican
Treasurer	Brittanica Born	Republican

=== State ===
Past Gubernatorial Elections Results
Year	Republican	Democratic	Third Parties
2024	85.87% 5,055	12.33% 726	1.80% 106
2020	84.78% 5,114	13.53% 816	1.69% 102
2016	77.18% 4,553	20.39% 1,203	2.42% 143
2012	63.78% 3,644	33.26% 1,900	2.96% 169
2008	62.17% 3,661	35.47% 2,089	2.36% 139
2004	79.43% 4,743	19.49% 1,164	1.07% 64
2000	70.15% 3,764	28.61% 1,535	1.25% 67
1996	57.60% 2,911	39.77% 2,010	2.63% 133
1992	64.77% 3,330	35.23% 1,811	0.00% 0

All of Barton County is a part of Missouri's 127th Legislative District in the Missouri House of Representatives and is represented by Ann Kelley (R-Lamar).

Missouri House of Representatives — District 127 — Barton County (2020)
Party	Candidate	Votes	%	±%
Republican	Ann Kelley	5,514	100.00%	+17.60

Missouri House of Representatives — District 127 — Barton County (2018)
Party	Candidate	Votes	%	±%
Republican	Ann Kelley	4,086	82.40%	−4.86
Democratic	Teri Hanna	873	17.60%	+4.85

All of Barton County is a part of Missouri's 31st Senatorial District in the Missouri Senate and is represented by Rick Brattin (R-Harrisonville).

Missouri Senate — District 31 — Barton County (2020)
Party	Candidate	Votes	%	±%
Republican	Rick Brattin	5,067	85.85%	+6.59
Democratic	Raymond Kinney	835	14.15%	+14.15

Missouri Senate — District 31 — Barton County (2016)
Party	Candidate	Votes	%	±%
Republican	Ed Emery	4,581	79.26%	+5.72
Independent	Tim Wells	773	13.37%	
Libertarian	Lora Young	426	7.37%	+7.37

=== Federal ===
All of Barton County is included in Missouri's 4th Congressional District and is represented by Vicky Hartzler (R-Harrisonville) in the U.S. House of Representatives. Hartzler was elected to a sixth term in 2020 over Democratic challenger Lindsey Simmons.

U.S. House of Representatives — Missouri's 4th Congressional District — Barton County (2020)
Party	Candidate	Votes	%	±%
Republican	Vicky Hartzler	5,053	85.07%	+0.80
Democratic	Lindsey Simmons	758	12.76%	−0.70
Libertarian	Steven K. Koonse	129	2.17%	−0.10

U.S. House of Representatives — Missouri's 4th Congressional District — Barton County (2018)
Party	Candidate	Votes	%	±%
Republican	Vicky J. Hartzler	4,196	84.27%	+0.36
Democratic	Renee Hoagenson	670	13.46%	+0.56
Libertarian	Mark Bliss	113	2.27%	−0.92

Barton County, along with the rest of the state of Missouri, is represented in the U.S. Senate by Josh Hawley (R-Columbia) and Eric Schmitt.

U.S. Senate – Class I – Barton County (2018)
Party	Candidate	Votes	%	±%
Republican	Josh Hawley	4,064	80.94%	+18.63
Democratic	Claire McCaskill	783	15.60%	−16.02
Independent	Craig O'Dear	97	1.93%	
Libertarian	Japheth Campbell	48	0.96%	−5.11
Green	Jo Crain	29	0.58%	+0.58

Blunt was elected to a second term in 2016 over then-Missouri Secretary of State Jason Kander.

U.S. Senate — Class III — Barton County (2016)
Party	Candidate	Votes	%	±%
Republican	Roy Blunt	4,479	75.77%	+13.46
Democratic	Jason Kander	1,231	20.83%	−10.79
Libertarian	Jonathan Dine	93	1.57%	−4.50
Green	Johnathan McFarland	47	0.80%	+0.80
Constitution	Fred Ryman	61	1.03%	+1.03

==== Political culture ====
United States presidential election results for Barton County, Missouri
Year	Republican		Democratic		Third party(ies)	
Year	No.	%	No.	%	No.	%
1888	1,543	39.02%	1,883	47.62%	528	13.35%
1892	1,335	33.47%	1,620	40.61%	1,034	25.92%
1896	1,496	33.92%	2,824	64.02%	91	2.06%
1900	1,780	41.15%	2,349	54.30%	197	4.55%
1904	1,843	46.13%	1,811	45.33%	341	8.54%
1908	1,673	43.36%	1,913	49.59%	272	7.05%
1912	1,010	26.57%	1,791	47.12%	1,000	26.31%
1916	1,597	39.77%	2,217	55.20%	202	5.03%
1920	3,480	51.07%	3,040	44.61%	294	4.31%
1924	2,952	48.59%	2,682	44.15%	441	7.26%
1928	3,662	61.19%	2,275	38.01%	48	0.80%
1932	2,092	34.27%	3,897	63.84%	115	1.88%
1936	3,164	43.65%	4,048	55.84%	37	0.51%
1940	3,737	51.09%	3,539	48.38%	39	0.53%
1944	3,356	55.32%	2,688	44.31%	23	0.38%
1948	2,577	46.08%	3,008	53.79%	7	0.13%
1952	4,056	60.17%	2,661	39.47%	24	0.36%
1956	3,547	55.18%	2,881	44.82%	0	0.00%
1960	3,703	60.51%	2,417	39.49%	0	0.00%
1964	2,332	42.36%	3,173	57.64%	0	0.00%
1968	2,928	55.68%	1,832	34.84%	499	9.49%
1972	4,026	77.93%	1,140	22.07%	0	0.00%
1976	2,708	53.34%	2,326	45.81%	43	0.85%
1980	3,337	61.82%	1,901	35.22%	160	2.96%
1984	3,996	74.78%	1,348	25.22%	0	0.00%
1988	3,339	67.35%	1,603	32.33%	16	0.32%
1992	2,775	53.43%	1,433	27.59%	986	18.98%
1996	2,812	55.74%	1,625	32.21%	608	12.05%
2000	3,836	71.49%	1,424	26.54%	106	1.98%
2004	4,572	76.31%	1,373	22.92%	46	0.77%
2008	4,414	74.21%	1,455	24.46%	79	1.33%
2012	4,418	76.89%	1,230	21.41%	98	1.71%
2016	4,959	83.50%	795	13.39%	185	3.12%
2020	5,168	85.04%	844	13.89%	65	1.07%
2024	5,159	85.77%	820	13.63%	36	0.60%

At the presidential level, Barton County is overwhelmingly Republican. Barton County strongly favored Donald Trump in both 2016 and 2020. A Democrat hasn't carried the county in a presidential election since Lyndon Johnson in 1964. Like most rural areas throughout Missouri, voters in Barton County generally adhere to socially and culturally conservative principles which tend to influence their Republican leanings.

=== Missouri presidential preference primaries ===
==== 2020 ====
The 2020 presidential primaries for both the Democratic and Republican parties were held in Missouri on March 10. On the Democratic side, former Vice President Joe Biden (D-Delaware) both won statewide and carried Barton County by a wide margin. Biden went on to defeat President Donald Trump in the general election.

Missouri Democratic Presidential Primary – Barton County (2020)
Party	Candidate	Votes	%	±%
Democratic	Joe Biden	241	57.25	
Democratic	Bernie Sanders	146	34.68	
Democratic	Tulsi Gabbard	7	1.66	
Democratic	Others/Uncommitted	27	6.41	

Incumbent President Donald Trump (R-Florida) faced a primary challenge from former Massachusetts Governor Bill Weld, but won both Barton County and statewide by overwhelming margins.

Missouri Republican Presidential Primary – Barton County (2020)
Party	Candidate	Votes	%	±%
Republican	Donald Trump	1,286	98.54	
Republican	Bill Weld	3	0.23	
Republican	Others/Uncommitted	16	1.23	

==== 2016 ====
The 2016 presidential primaries for both the Republican and Democratic parties were held in Missouri on March 15. Businessman Donald Trump (R-New York) narrowly won the state overall, but Senator Ted Cruz (R-Texas) carried a majority of the vote in Barton County. Trump went on to win the nomination and the presidency.

Missouri Republican Presidential Primary – Barton County (2016)
Party	Candidate	Votes	%	±%
Republican	Ted Cruz	1,560	53.94	
Republican	Donald Trump	986	34.09	
Republican	John Kasich	170	5.88	
Republican	Marco Rubio	102	3.53	
Republican	Others/Uncommitted	74	2.56	

On the Democratic side, former Secretary of State Hillary Clinton (D-New York) won statewide by a small margin, but Senator Bernie Sanders (I-Vermont) narrowly won Barton County.

Missouri Democratic Presidential Primary – Barton County (2016)
Party	Candidate	Votes	%	±%
Democratic	Bernie Sanders	214	50.24	
Democratic	Hillary Clinton	205	48.12	
Democratic	Others/Uncommitted	7	1.64	

==== 2012 ====
The 2012 Missouri Republican Presidential Primary's results were nonbinding on the state's national convention delegates. Voters in Barton County supported former U.S. Senator Rick Santorum (R-Pennsylvania), who finished first in the state at large, but eventually lost the nomination to former Governor Mitt Romney (R-Massachusetts). Delegates to the congressional district and state conventions were chosen at a county caucus, which selected a delegation favoring Santorum. Incumbent President Barack Obama easily won the Missouri Democratic Primary and renomination. He defeated Romney in the general election.

==== 2008 ====
In 2008, the Missouri Republican Presidential Primary was closely contested, with Senator John McCain (R-Arizona) prevailing and eventually winning the nomination. However, former Arkansas Governor Mike Huckabee won a clear majority among Barton County Republicans, receiving more votes than any other candidate in either major party.

Missouri Republican Presidential Primary – Barton County (2008)
Party	Candidate	Votes	%	±%
Republican	Mike Huckabee	1,188	55.72	
Republican	John McCain	525	24.62	
Republican	Mitt Romney	344	16.14	
Republican	Ron Paul	45	2.11	
Republican	Others/Uncommitted	30	1.32	

Then-Senator Hillary Clinton (D-New York) carried Barton County in the 2008 Democratic presidential primary. Despite initial reports that Clinton had won Missouri, Barack Obama (D-Illinois), also a Senator at the time, narrowly defeated her statewide and later became that year's Democratic nominee, going on to win the presidency.

Missouri Democratic Presidential Primary – Barton County (2008)
Party	Candidate	Votes	%	±%
Democratic	Hillary Clinton	614	63.43	
Democratic	Barack Obama	318	32.85	
Democratic	Others/Uncommitted	36	3.72	

== See also ==
- National Register of Historic Places listings in Barton County, Missouri
