= Golden City, Missouri =

- City
- Logo

- Location of Golden City, Missouri
- Coordinates: 37°23′35″N 94°05′39″W
- Country: United States
- State: Missouri
- County: Barton
- Township: Golden City

Area
  - Total: 1.03 sq mi (2.68 km^{2})
  - Land: 1.03 sq mi (2.68 km^{2})
  - Water: 0 sq mi (0.00 km^{2})
- Elevation: 1,060 ft (320 m)

Population (2020)
  - Total: 656
  - Density: 634.1/sq mi (244.81/km^{2})
- Time zone: UTC-6 (Central (CST))
  - Summer (DST): UTC-5 (CDT)
- ZIP code: 64748
- Area code: 417
- FIPS code: 29-27676
- GNIS feature ID: 2394923
- Website: www.goldencitymo.com

Golden City is a city in Golden City Township, Barton County, Missouri, United States. The population was 656 at the 2020 census.

== History ==
Golden City was established in 1867 as a stop on the Butterfield Stagecoach Line. It takes its name from a nearby area known as Golden Grove. In reality the diggings were done by Indians mining an outcropping of exceptionally fine flint. Another rumor for its naming stems from the Indian dig sites, early settlers thought the flint mines were Spanish gold mines. It was re-platted in 1870. The Golden City Herald served the community from 1881 until Dec. 28, 1972. Dellard Surbrugg published the newspaper and ran a commercial printing business from 1940 until he sold the paper to Gene Wotkiewicz, editor and publisher of the Lockwood Luminary.

=== 2019 tornado ===
At approximately 9:30 PM on May 22, 2019, an EF3 tornado struck the city. The storm killed three people and injured a few others. Many homes were unsalvageable.

== Geography ==
According to the United States Census Bureau, the city has a total area of 1.03 square miles (2.67 km^{2}), all land.

Golden City is located in the heart of Missouri Tall Grass Prairie country. Several preserved prairies are located within a few miles of town, the most significant of which are the Golden Prairie, the Cook Meadow and the Pennsylvania Prairie.

== Demographics ==
Historical population
Census	Pop.	Note	%±
1880	139		—
1890	773		456.1%
1900	875		13.2%
1910	882		0.8%
1920	899		1.9%
1930	828		−7.9%
1940	867		4.7%
1950	839		−3.2%
1960	714		−14.9%
1970	810		13.4%
1980	900		11.1%
1990	794		−11.8%
2000	884		11.3%
2010	765		−13.5%
2020	656		−14.2%
U.S. Decennial Census

=== 2010 census ===
As of the census of 2010, there were 765 people, 325 households, and 197 families living in the city. The population density was 742.7 inhabitants per square mile (286.8/km^{2}). There were 393 housing units at an average density of 381.6 units per square mile (147.3 units/km^{2}). The racial makeup of the city was 96.1% White, 0.1% African American, 1.7% Native American, 0.3% Asian, 0.7% from other races, and 1.2% from two or more races. Hispanic or Latino of any race were 1.4% of the population.

There were 325 households, of which 30.2% had children under the age of 18 living with them, 42.5% were married couples living together, 13.2% had a female householder with no husband present, 4.9% had a male householder with no wife present, and 39.4% were non-families. 33.2% of all households were made up of individuals, and 16.3% had someone living alone who was 65 years of age or older. The average household size was 2.34 and the average family size was 3.02.

The median age in the city was 38.5 years. 25.4% of residents were under the age of 18; 8.6% were between the ages of 18 and 24; 22% were from 25 to 44; 26% were from 45 to 64; and 17.8% were 65 years of age or older. The gender makeup of the city was 52.3% male and 47.7% female.

=== 2000 census ===
As of the census of 2000, there were 884 people, 369 households, and 225 families living in the city. The population density was 861.1 inhabitants per square mile (332.5/km^{2}). There were 423 housing units at an average density of 412.0 units per square mile (159.1 units/km^{2}). The racial makeup of the city was 96.04% White, 1.92% Native American, 0.45% Asian, 0.11% from other races, and 1.47% from two or more races. Hispanic or Latino of any race were 2.15% of the population.

There were 369 households, out of which 29.5% had children under the age of 18 living with them, 47.4% were married couples living together, 10.0% had a female householder with no husband present, and 38.8% were non-families. 33.6% of all households were made up of individuals, and 16.0% had someone living alone who was 65 years of age or older. The average household size was 2.37 and the average family size was 3.08.

In the city the population was spread out, with 26.5% under the age of 18, 8.1% from 18 to 24, 27.0% from 25 to 44, 20.0% from 45 to 64, and 18.3% who were 65 years of age or older. The median age was 37 years. For every 100 females, there were 97.3 males. For every 100 females age 18 and over, there were 90.1 males.

The median income for a household in the city was $21,793, and the median income for a family was $25,347. Males had a median income of $21,875 versus $16,875 for females. The per capita income for the city was $11,192. About 14.6% of families and 23.2% of the population were below the poverty line, including 29.6% of those under age 18 and 28.5% of those age 65 or over.

== Education ==
Public education in Golden City is administered by Golden City R-III School District, which operates one elementary school and Golden City High School.

Golden City has a public library, a branch of the Barton County Library.
