= Boots Court Motel =

Historic motor hotel in Carthage, Missouri

Boots Court
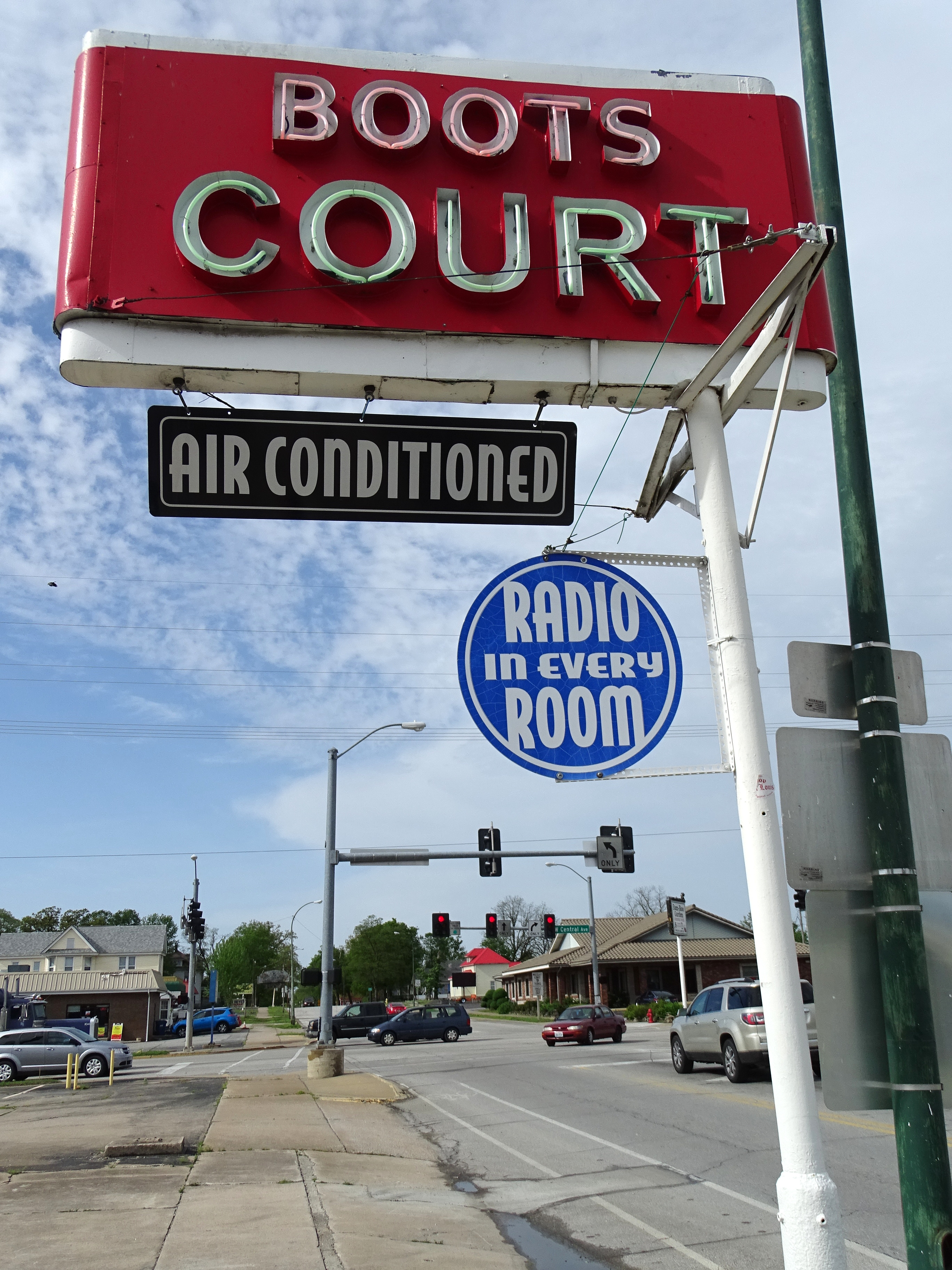
- Boots Court Motel on US Route 66
- Interactive map of the Boots Court area

General information
- Location: Carthage, Missouri, 107 S. Garrison Avenue
- Coordinates: 37.1783°N 94.3143°W
- Opening: 1939
- Owner: C Town LLC

Technical details
- Floor count: 1

Design and construction
- Developer: Arthur and Ilda Boots

Other information
- Number of rooms: 13 (originally 4)

Website
- bootscourt66.com

The Boots Motel, a historic U.S. Route 66 motor hotel in Carthage, Missouri, opened in 1939 as the Boots Court at 107 S. Garrison Avenue.

It served travellers at the "crossroads of America" (US 66 and U.S. Route 71, the major roads of that era) and was built in streamline moderne and art deco architectural style, its roofline and walls accented in black Carrara glass and green neon. Arthur and Ilda Boots originally advertised "a radio in every room" and each room included a covered carport.

A filling station briefly operated at the front of the property when it opened during the Great Depression but was soon replaced by the motel's office.

The motel was one of two to bear the Boots Court name; Arthur's brother Loyd A. Boots had established a 1930 Boots Cottage Court on US 54 in Eldon which became Randle's Court upon its sale to Helen Randle in 1947. Both of these properties are being painstakingly restored to a historic "radio in every room" 1940s, by different private preservationists.

== Expansion ==
In the mid-1940s, Arthur Boots opened a drive-in across the street, offering fountain service and "breakfast at any hour." KDMO AM 1490 broadcast on-location interviews with many passing through from faraway places on US 66 and 71 as "Breakfast at the Crossroads of America". While business was initially brisk, ultimately Interstate 44 diverted traffic seven miles south of the town and the restaurant closed in 1971. Its building now houses a credit union; a replica of its curved front was incorporated into a Route 66 display at the Jasper County Courthouse.

Ples Neely and his wife purchased the motel in 1942, expanding it to 13 rooms in 1946 by adding a five-room building at the back of the property. In keeping with traditions and superstitions of the times, the thirteenth room is numbered 14 to avoid the unlucky number 13. Rachel Asplin purchased the motel in 1948 with her husband Ruben and operated it until she died at age 91 in 1991. The first television stations in the Joplin-Springfield region signed on in 1953; after that, Boots Court advertised television, telephones and air conditioning among its amenities. In the motel's heyday, notable clients included Clark Gable, Mickey Mantle and Gene Autry.

== Decline ==
The property declined under a series of subsequent owners, at one point being rented monthly as single-room, low-income housing after a 2003 attempt to flip the property for demolition and redevelopment as a Walgreens failed after public outrage. The motel was unavailable for short-term rental to tourists on US 66 throughout the Vince Scott ownership period (October 2003 – June 2011) and deteriorated severely. By 2011, the motel buildings, though still standing, were among the Society for Commercial Archeology's ten most endangered roadside attractions in America and among the Missouri Alliance for Historic Preservation's most endangered buildings in the state.

It's in rough shape. They've torn it up. I've been renting it out as lower rent housing for five years, and these people have no money, so they've stolen everything they could steal. It would take some money to restore it. It's got a new roof; I put a new roof on the front, but someone would have to rewire it and replace a lot of things. It could be brought back, though, if a person had the interest."

— Vince Scott, Boots Motel owner in May 2011

== Restoration ==
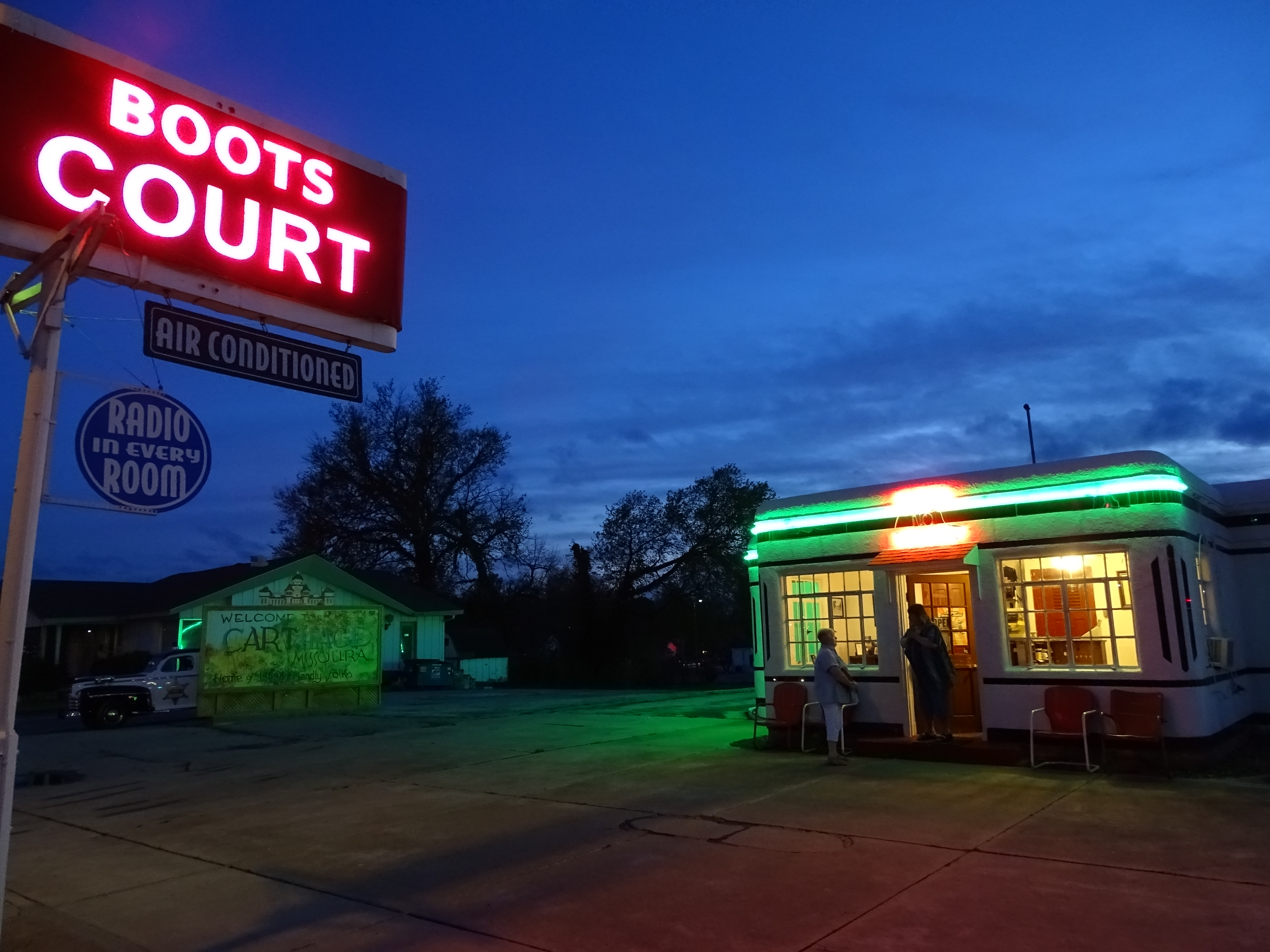
Boots Court following restoration

After attempts to sell the motel and an adjacent house in 2011 for $190,000 found no takers, the property was auctioned for $105,000 to Hometown Bank, a creditor, as a result of foreclosure. It was purchased in August 2011 by sisters Deborah Harvey and Priscilla Bledsaw, who have begun to restore the buildings to their 1940s' appearance.

We were holding our breath. Then we found out it was bought with the intention to restore it as a motel, which is its best use, and by people who have preservation experience. What is really special is their attention to detail. They’re taking such care; the preservation has been very authentic.

— Kaisa Barthuli, program manager, US National Park Service Route 66 Corridor Preservation Program

A 1970s' gabled roof installed during the Asplin era was restored to the original flat roof in April 2013, a prerequisite for listing the streamline moderne property on the US National Register of Historic Places. The $12,000 federal matching grant from the National Park Service Route 66 Corridor Preservation Program required the owners raise a matching $12,000 sum — a task which was assisted by donations and a preservation award from the Route 66 Association of Missouri. An additional matching grant funded the 2016 restoration of the building's architectural neon.

The Boots Motel is one of the very important properties along Route 66. Now that the roof has been removed, it will be eligible as a listing on the National Register of Historic Places which will truly acknowledge its role in our American history.

— Kaisa Barthuli, National Park Service

The sisters reopened the first portion (five rooms in the 1946 annex building) to Route 66 travellers in May 2012, as part of a proposed five-year restoration effort with help from Ron Hart of the Route 66 Chamber of Commerce. They had planned to use the income from occupancy of this section of the motel, along with individual donations and souvenir sales from the old motel's office, to restore the eight original rooms in the main building.

The original red-and-white Boots Court neon signage was restored by the original signmaker in 2013 with a $2500 donation from "tattoo man" Ron Jones of Bartlesville, Oklahoma. Jones is known on U.S. Route 66 for the more than eighty individual tattoos on his body identifying various individual Route 66 landmarks, including the Boots Motel.

By 2020, seven of the motel's thirteen rooms were restored and open.

With travel in decline because of the COVID-19 pandemic and the owners getting on in age, the Boots Court was put back on the market for $210,000 and sold to a pair of local couples. A 501(c) organization, the Boots Court Foundation, was established in 2021 to complete the restorations.

“We’re doing as much as we can to make it feel like you’re walking into a room that you would rent back in the Forties. The showers are the original size. The rooms are very small. They look and feel like they did when they were original.

— Danny Lambeth, president, Boots Court Foundation.

On 15 July 2022, the Missouri Advisory Council on Historic Preservation approved a recommendation for a National Register of Historic Places listing. The motel's listing was approved by the National Park Service on September 26, 2022. The Boots Court Foundation reopened the last of the motel's thirteen historically-restored rooms on 17 February 2023, with restoration efforts continuing on an adjacent Sinclair fuel station as a possible future Route 66 visitor centre.

The newly restored rooms include 1940s' touches such as real keys, chrome light fixtures, chenille bedspreads, monogrammed towels, built-in dressers and a radio tuned to a station playing 1940s' hits. Bob Boots, the 82-year-old (in 2011) son of the original owners, travelled from Tulsa to Carthage in 2012 as the first guest of the restored motel at the 1940s' price of $2.50/night, which he reportedly paid in 1939 currency.

== See also ==
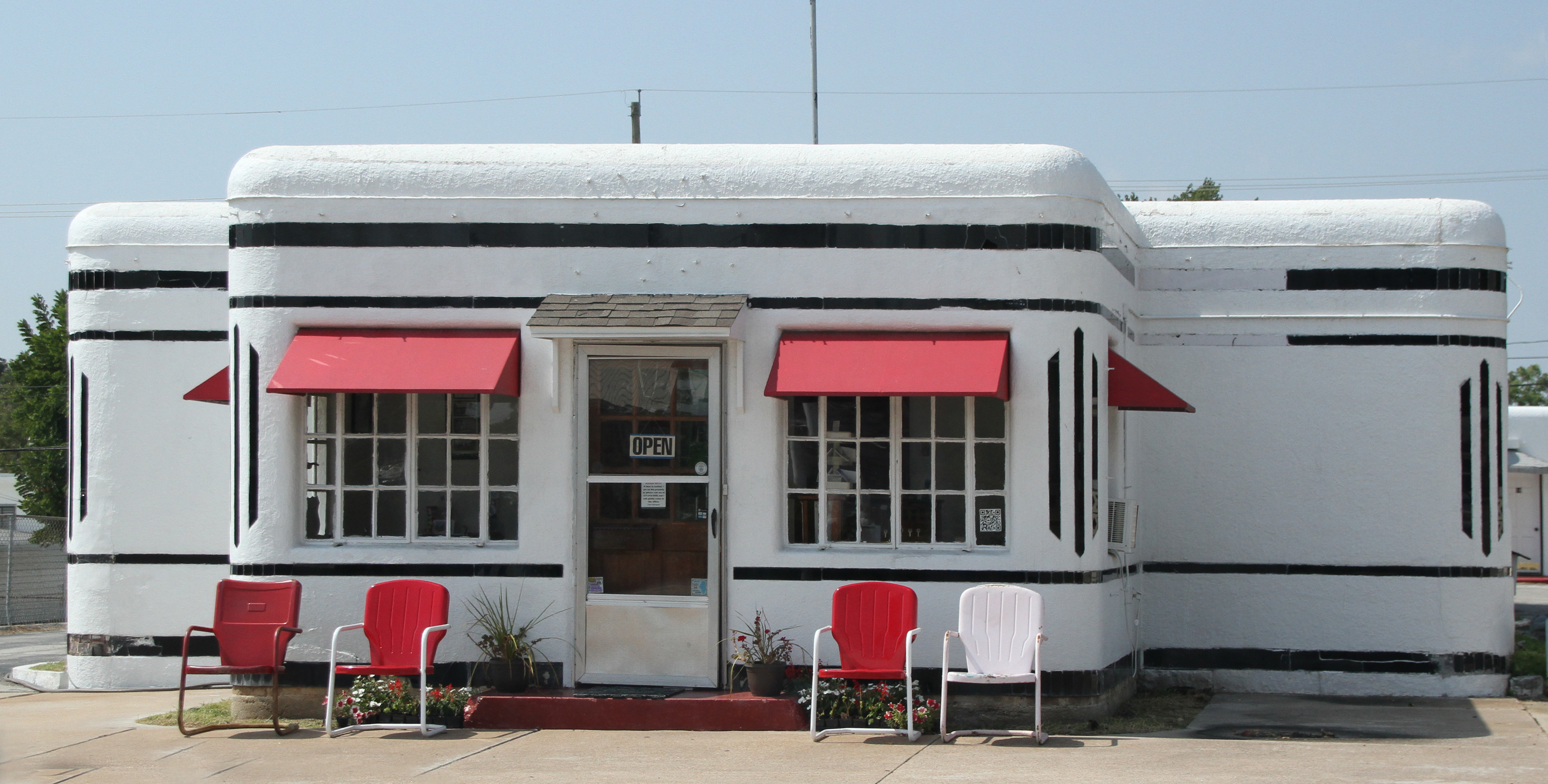
Boots Court in 2014.

- 66 Drive-In, a 1949 drive-in cinema in Carthage, Missouri in what was locally a pre-television era. TV was demonstrated by NBC as a curiosity at the 1939 World's Fair. By 1949 the signals reached Tulsa, Kansas City and St. Louis; with just over a hundred US TV stations, nationwide coverage was not yet complete.
- KDMO, a local Carthage AM radio station with a nostalgia theme
- Hangar One Museum at the Tuskegee Airmen National Historic Site, a previous historic restoration effort by one of the sisters who restored this property
- Jefferson Highway (1916-1926), a main north-south route (Winnipeg to New Orleans) before the US Numbered Highway System, passed through Carthage. While too new to be part of the history, Boots Court is a member of a Jefferson Highway Association promoting this trail.
- Wagon Wheel Motel, Café and Station (1938). the oldest motel still operational on US Route 66. Boots Court (1939) bills itself as the second-oldest on the route.
- Coral Court Motel, another streamline moderne motel on US Route 66 in Missouri, now demolished.
- List of motels
