= Paul Baskis =

American biochemist

Paul Baskis is an Illinois biochemist, who, in the 1980s found a way of synthetically producing oil from industrial and household wastes without expending more energy than is produced.

This process is called Thermal depolymerizing reforming process and apparatus and was patented, U.S. patent 5,269,947 in 1993. The rights to the patent were acquired by Changing World Technologies.
