= KMXL =

Radio station in Carthage–Joplin, Missouri

- Carthage, Missouri; United States
- Broadcast area: Joplin, Missouri
- Frequency: 95.1 MHz
- Branding: 95.1 Mike FM

Programming
- Format: Adult hits
- Affiliations: Westwood One

Ownership
- Owner: Carthage Broadcasting Company, Inc.
- Sister stations: KDMO

History
- First air date: 1972 (as KRGK)
- Former call signs: KRGK (1972–1990)

Technical information
- Licensing authority: FCC
- Facility ID: 9215
- Class: C2
- ERP: 50,000 watts
- HAAT: 144 meters
- Transmitter coordinates: 37°10′58.00″N 94°21′35.00″W

Links
- Public license information: Public file; LMS
- Webcast: Listen Live
- Website: 951mikefm.com

KMXL (95.1 FM) is an American radio station serving the Joplin, Missouri, metropolitan area and is one of the top rated Adult Hits stations in the nation. Having an effective radiated power of 50,000 watts, KMXL puts out a city-grade signal across the entire metro area. The station is owned by Carthage Broadcasting Company, Inc., and features programming from Westwood One.

KMXL broadcasts under the "Mike FM" trade name, as does WHZZ in Lansing and several other U.S. and Canadian radio stations.
