= Annie Rooney =

Annie Rooney may refer to:

- Little Annie Rooney, an American comic strip about a young orphaned girl and her dog
- Miss Annie Rooney, a 1942 American comedy-drama film directed by Edwin L. Marin

== See also ==
- Little Annie Rooney (disambiguation)
