= Annie White Baxter =

American politician

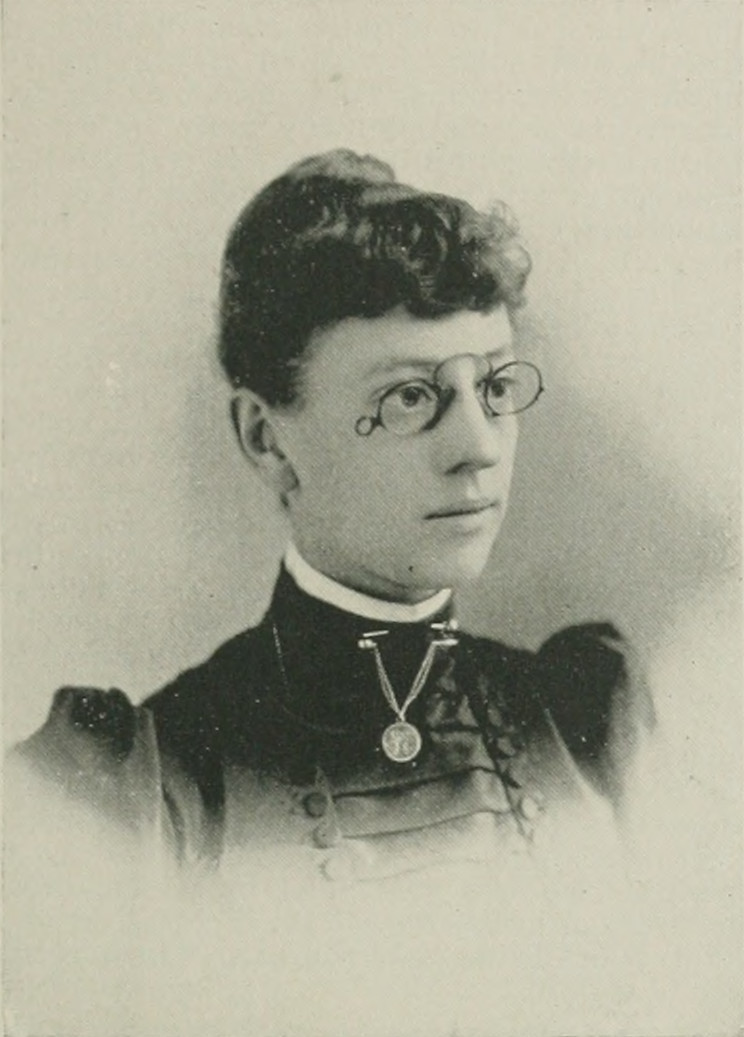
- Annie White Baxter, "A Woman of the Century"

County clerk
- In office 1890–1894
- Constituency: Jasper County, Missouri

Personal details
- Born: March 2, 1864
- Died: June 28, 1944 (aged 80)
- Party: Democratic Party

Annie White Baxter (March 2, 1864 – June 28, 1944) was a Missouri politician. At her election as county clerk of Jasper County, Missouri, in 1890, she became the first elected female office-holder in the state, as well as the first female county clerk in the United States.

== Life and career ==
Annie White was born the second of three children of cabinetmaker John B. and Jennie Black White in Pittsburgh, Pennsylvania, and was of English and German descent. When she was two, she moved with her family to Newark, Ohio; she moved with them again to Carthage, Missouri in 1876 when her father began operation of a furniture factory in the town. She also lived in Joplin for a time. She graduated from Carthage High School, where she was said to be the most outspoken pupil in her class, in 1882, and took a job assisting Jasper County Clerk George Blakeney; she was subsequently appointed deputy clerk to John N. Wilson. Her nomination to the position attracted a good deal of attention, and it was required of the Missouri Attorney General to approve the appointment before she could begin her duties. Baxter worked for Wilson's successor, Jesse Rhoads, as well. In 1888 she married Charles W. Baxter, a dry goods clerk at the R. H. Rose Department Store. She initially retired from the county to focus on domestic affairs, but when the clerk became incapacitated and unable to perform his duties she was recalled to her former position.

Due largely to her reputation as a supporter of well-run county government, the county Democratic Party nominated Baxter as its candidate for county clerk in 1890, but there was some uncertainty as to whether or not she was eligible to run, as women at the time could not vote. Nevertheless, she remained on the ballot, defeating Republican Julius Fischer by more than four hundred votes, 53 percent of the final tally in total; he appears not to have seriously contested the election, expecting an easy victory. But Baxter had support among the miners of the county, who went door-to-door singing "Little Annie Rooney", the name being their nickname for her, while canvassing on her behalf. Fischer challenged the result, but was denied by the circuit court judge of Greene County; he was also ordered to pay her legal fees. News of Baxter's victory appeared in The New York Times, where it was described as a "peculiarity".

Baxter soon earned a reputation as among the state's best county clerks, and beyond her regular duties assisted in the planning and initial construction of the current courthouse building, completed in 1895. She also spent time making the work of her office more efficient. She even gained recognition from the Governor of Missouri, David R. Francis, who named her an honorary colonel; from this was derived her nickname, "Colonel Baxter". Nevertheless, 1894 was a landslide year for Republicans nationwide, and Baxter was among the Democrats who lost their positions, in part because her husband had been hired as a deputy clerk and some opponents objected to the fact that both were being paid by the county. She and Charles later divorced after living in St. Louis for a time.

Baxter returned to politics when fellow Carthage Democrat Cornelius Roach, a former business partner of her husband's, became Missouri Secretary of State in 1908; he appointed her state registrar of lands, a role which she discharged until 1916. She became financial secretary of the Missouri Constitutional Convention in 1922; in 1936 she was a delegate to the Democratic Party's state convention. She also served, for a time, as the secretary to James Thomas Quarles, founding dean of the School of Fine Arts at the University of Missouri.

Baxter died of pneumonia in Jefferson City, and is buried in River View Cemetery. A street in Joplin bears her name, as does the Columbia, Missouri chapter of the American Association of University Women. In 2012 Missouri Life magazine named her one of the Top Ten Women Who Changed Missouri. Also in 2012 she was inducted into the Hall of Carthage Heroes. A marker on the grounds of the Jasper County Courthouse details her accomplishments.
