= Our Lady of the Ozarks College =

Monastic campus school in Carthage, Missouri, US

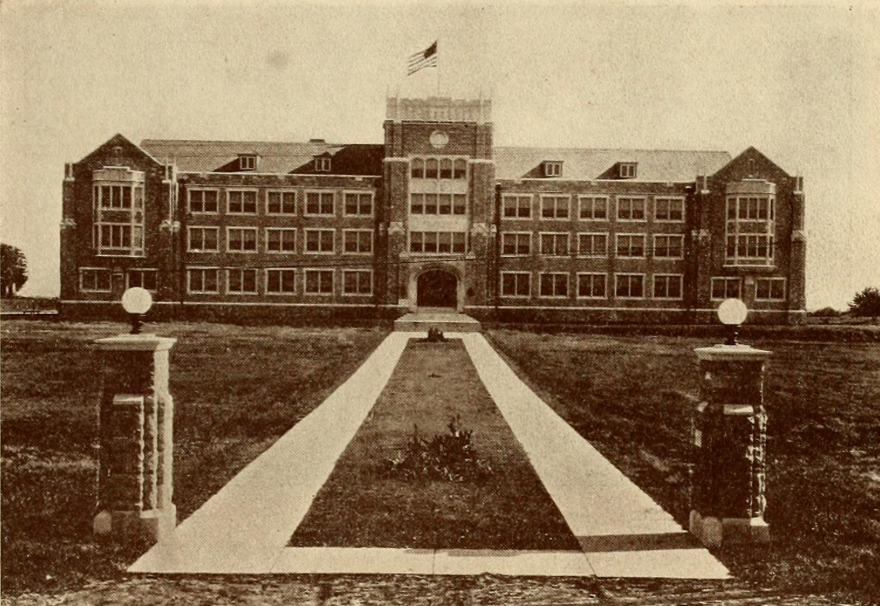
- The main building as it appeared in the 1929 The Ashlar yearbook

Location
- 1900 Grand Ave; Carthage, Missouri 64836; United States
- 37.1565°N 94.3095°W

Information
- Former name: Ozark Wesleyan College; Ozark Junior College; Our Lady of the Ozarks College
- Type: Monastic campus
- Religious affiliation: Christian
- Denomination: Catholic
- Established: September 16, 1924 (as Ozark Wesleyan College); June 23, 1975 (as headquarters of the Congregation of the Mother of the Redeemer)
- Campus size: 27.5 acres (11.1 ha)
- Website: dongcong.us

Our Lady of the Ozarks College is the historic name of a religious campus in Carthage, Missouri, United States. It began its history as a Methodist Ozark Wesleyan College in 1924, before transitioning to the independent Ozark Junior College in 1932, before becoming Our Lady of the Ozarks College in 1944. Since 1975, it has served as the monastery headquarters of the Assumption Province of the Catholic Congregation of the Mother of the Redeemer religious order.

== History ==
=== Ozark Wesleyan College ===
On January 24, 1924, the plot of land on which the institution stands was selected for the new Ozark Wesleyan College, to educate Methodists in the area. A fundraising campaign had pledged $1.2 million ($22.5 million in 2025) by June, and the college opened on September 16, 1924, as the combination of three prior institutions: Carelton College in Farmington, Missouri, Arkansas Conference College in Siloam Springs, Arkansas, and Marionville College in Marionville, Missouri. The college was affiliated with the Saint Louis Conference of the Methodist Episcopal Church. Classes were initially held in houses near campus. St. Louis architecture firm Bonsack & Pierce were selected as the architects with local architect Percy K. Simpson as associate architect of the main building on the 27.5-acre (11.1 ha) campus. Construction began in 1925, and the building was dedicated on June 2, 1926. Built of Carthage stone from local quarries in the Tudor Gothic style, it contained offices, library, classrooms, laboratories, an auditorium, and a gymnasium and was built at a cost of ($4.59 million in 2025). The first class graduated in 1929; however, by 1932 the college was experiencing financial troubles and ceased operations. Salaries, maintenance, back taxes, and unfulfilled financial pledges due to the Great Depression contributed to the financial troubles. Assets were liquidated, and records were sent to Central Wesleyan College.

=== Ozark Junior College ===
In July 1932, it was announced that a new independent school run by a board of trustees, entitled Ozark Junior College, would be established at the former Ozark Wesleyan campus. Local leaders attempted to assure area residents, many of whom had donated for the construction of the college, that the school was legally entirely separate from the prior Ozark Wesleyan College, and had sufficient funds to carry out operations. In order to meet mortgage obligations, by 1943 the trustees of the institution sought to sell it, meeting with prospective buyers. The Carthage school district was approached to purchase the property but declined due to the building's condition.

=== Our Lady of the Ozarks College ===
The Missionary Oblates of Mary Immaculate ended up purchasing the property, with the aim to open a school in September 1944. The school was dedicated on November 29, 1944, with Bishop Edwin Vincent O'Hara of the Diocese of Kansas City presiding over a procession and blessing of the grounds, followed by a Solemn High Mass.

The college received affiliation with the Catholic University of America in 1949, allowing its graduates to receive diplomas issued by Catholic University. In 1959, the Oblates constructed a shrine chapel to Our Lady of Fatima.

Due to declining enrollment, the college closed in 1971 and records were sent to St. Henry's Preparatory Seminary in Belleville, Illinois.

=== Congregation of the Mother of the Redeemer ===
After the Fall of Saigon, around 170 members of the Congregation of the Mother Coredemptrix arrived as boat people in the United States at Fort Chaffee, Camp Pendleton, and other Operation New Arrivals refugee camps. Cardinal Bernard Francis Law, then Bishop of Springfield–Cape Girardeau, sponsored the priests and brothers. It was announced by the Diocese of Springfield–Cape Girardeau on June 23, 1975, that the Congregation of the Mother Coredemptrix would move in to the former college. By 1981, the Oblates sold the college to the Congregation. Ngô Đình Thục lived at the seminary for the last months of his life in 1984.

==== Marian Days ====
Since 1978, the campus has been used annually for Marian Days, a Catholic Vietnamese festival bringing tens of thousands of people to the area. Crowds in recent years have been estimated between 75,000 and 100,000; Carthage's own population is only around 12,500.

== Campus ==
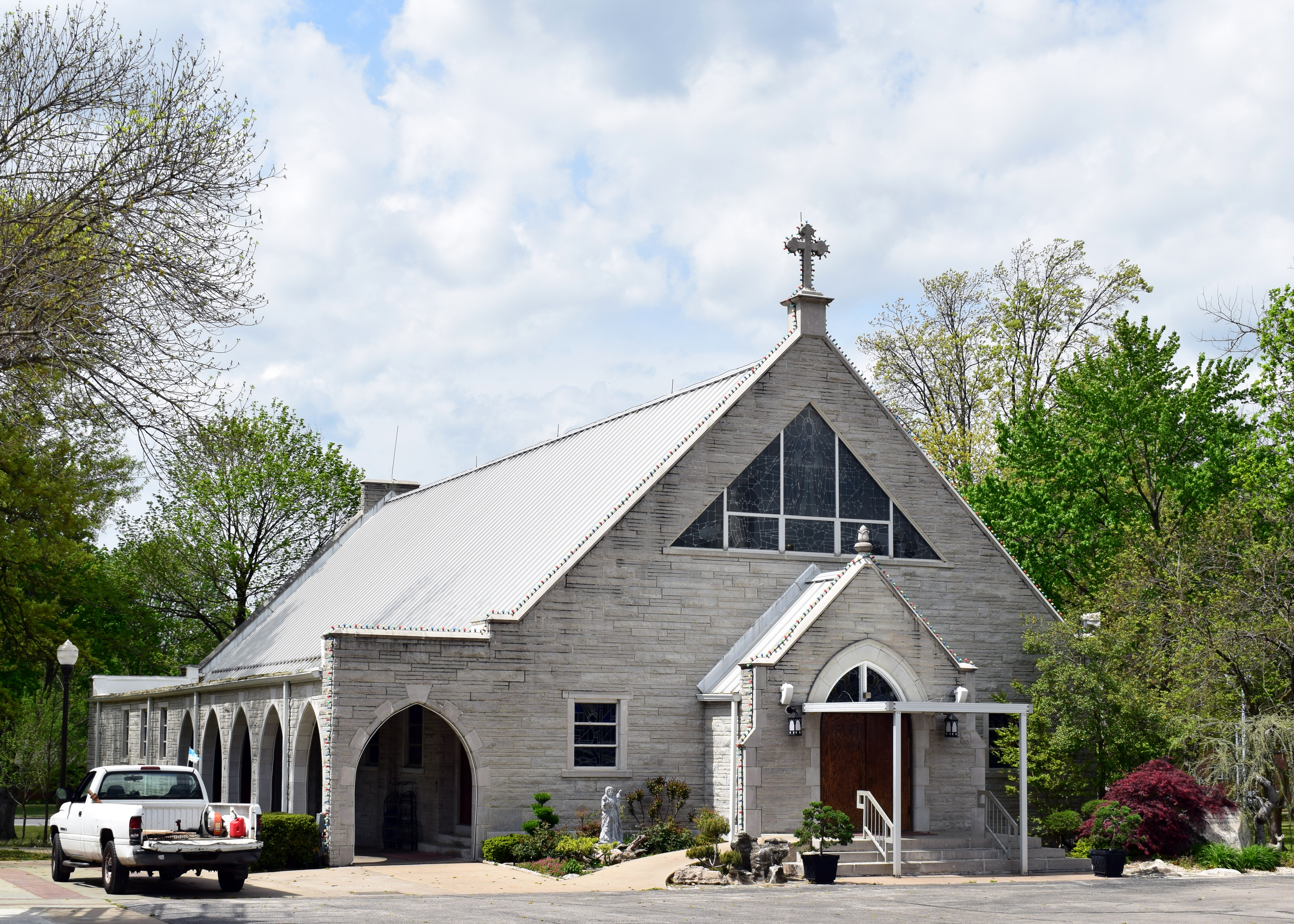
Immaculate Heart of Mary Shrine (Đền Thánh Khiết Tâm Mẹ)

The Assumption Building (Vietnamese: Nhà Đức Mẹ Lên Trời) is the oldest building on campus. It was designed by Bonsack and Pierce in the Tudor Gothic style and built of Carthage stone from local quarries. It is colloquially known as the "three-level building" (Nhà Ba Lầu) and houses administrative offices, an auditorium, a library, and dormitory rooms. The Queen of Peace Garden (Công trường Nữ Vương Hòa Bình) features a large statue of Our Lady of Refugees (Tượng Đài Đức Mẹ Tỵ Nạn), which depicts the Virgin Mary holding the child Jesus with a hand outstretched to a refugee. It was sculpted in 1983.

A shrine chapel to Our Lady of Fatima was built in 1959. It is dedicated to the Immaculate Heart of Mary.
