= Congregation of the Mother of the Redeemer =

Catholic religious institute founded in Vietnam

- Congregatio Redemptoris Matris
- Abbreviation: CRM
- Formation: February 2, 1953; 73 years ago
- Founder: Dominic Maria Trần Đình Thủ
- Founded at: Xuân Trường, Nam Định
- Type: Clerical religious congregation of diocesan right for men
- Headquarters: Thủ Đức, Ho Chi Minh City, Vietnam
- General Minister: Louis Maria Vũ Minh Nhiên
- Patroness: Our Lady of Sorrows
- Website: tinmung.net

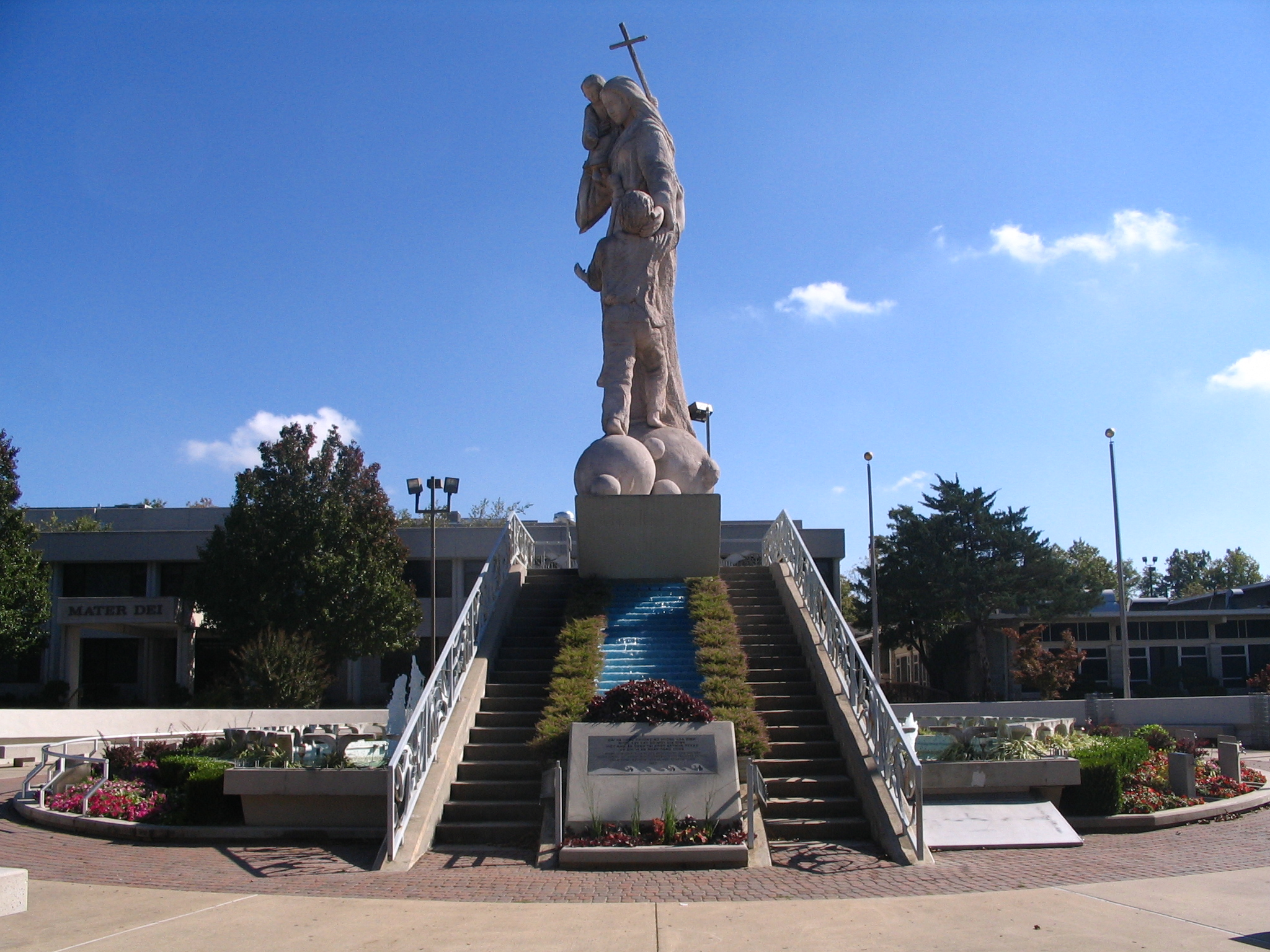
Our Lady of Refugees (Đức Mẹ Tỵ Nạn, 1983) in the Our Lady Queen of Peace Garden, Carthage, Missouri

The Congregation of the Mother of the Redeemer (Vietnamese: Dòng Mẹ Chúa Cứu Chuộc; Latin: Congregatio Redemptoris Matris, abbreviated CRM) is a religious institute within the Catholic Church that is based in Vietnam and dominated by Vietnamese people. The congregation is better known by its former name, the Congregation of the Mother Coredemptrix (Vietnamese: Dòng Đức Mẹ Đồng Công Cứu Chuộc or simply Dòng Đồng Công; Latin: Congregatio Matris Coredemptricis, CMC), which used an unofficial title of the Blessed Virgin Mary. Dominic Maria Trần Đình Thủ, CMC, is the congregation's founder.

The congregation's motherhouse is located in Thủ Đức, Ho Chi Minh City. The United States Assumption Province maintains a monastery in Carthage, Missouri, where it hosts an annual Marian Days pilgrimage, the largest annual Roman Catholic festival in the United States. Before 1975, the congregation was relatively small in Vietnam, overshadowed by the Dominican, Franciscan, Jesuit, and Redemptorist institutes, among others. However, in the United States, virtually all Vietnamese Roman Catholics are aware of the congregation.

== History ==
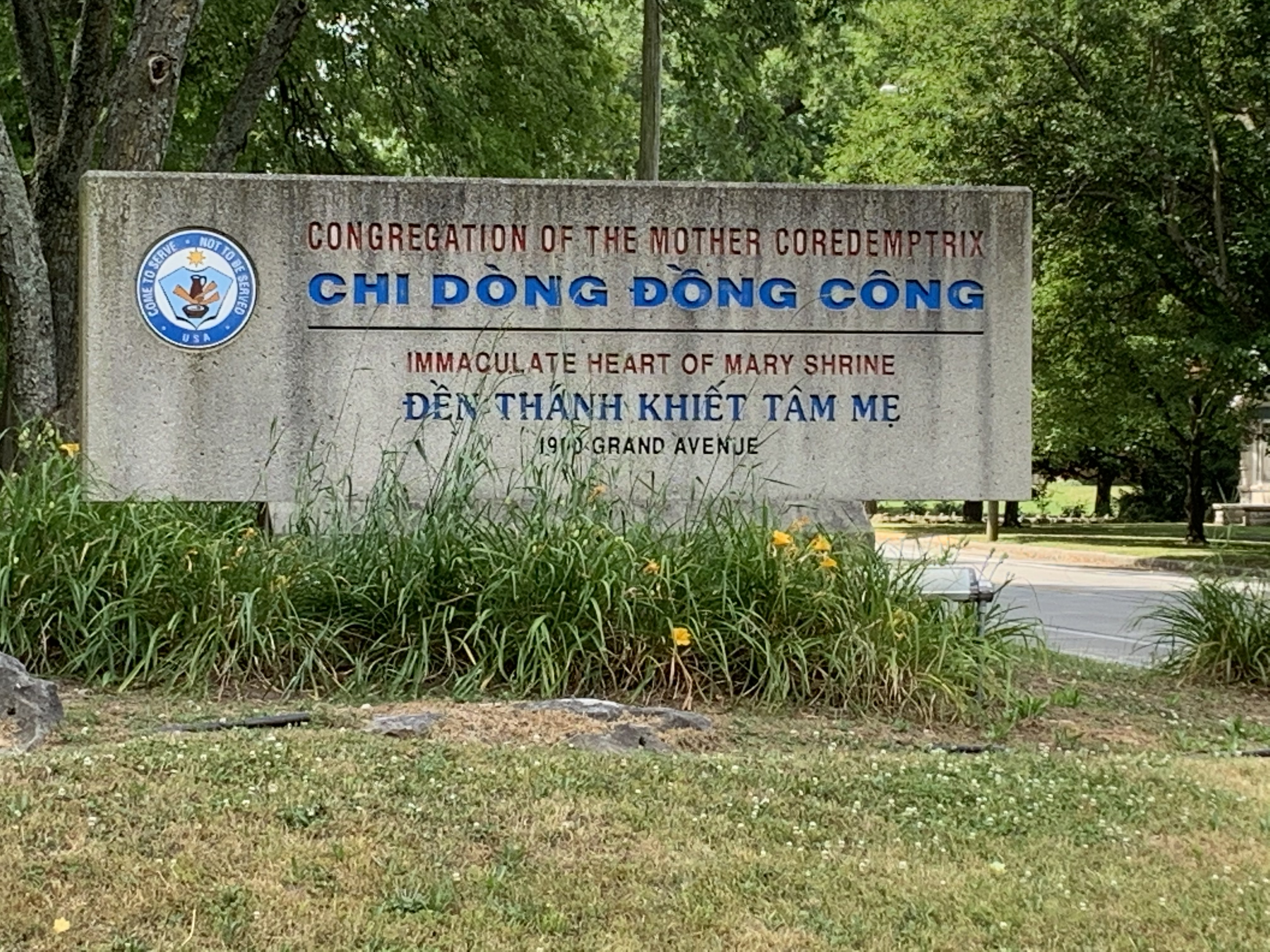
Congregation Of The Mother Coredemptrix in Carthage, Missouri

On April 4, 1941, Dominic Maria Trần Đình Thủ, an instructor at the Quần Phương seminary, was given permission to establish the Congregation of the Mother Co-Redemptrix in Liên Thủy hamlet, Xuân Ngọc commune, Xuân Trường district, Nam Định province, in the Diocese of Bùi Chu. The congregation was officially established on February 2, 1953, with Fr. Dominic Maria as the superior. In August 1954, during the Partition of Vietnam, the congregation moved to various locations in South Vietnam, eventually settling in Thủ Đức.

After the Fall of Saigon, Fr. Dominic Maria was imprisoned by the Communist authorities from June 12, 1975, to April 29, 1977, on accusations of spying for the CIA. Fifty-two companions were also imprisoned for shorter terms. Fr. Dominic Maria was again arrested from May 16, 1987, on charges of state subversion. His sentence was reduced from life imprisonment to 20 years' imprisonment, but he was released early for unclear reasons on May 18, 1993. The congregation's assets were seized, except for a small dormitory for seminarians in Thủ Đức.

As of 2008, the congregation has 700 members worldwide, including 360 priests, 170 brothers, and 10 novices in Vietnam. As of 2009, the U.S. province includes 23 priests, 54 brothers, five novices, seven postulants, and 25 high school students. CRM priests serve parishes in eight states. As of 2012, the congregation has 500 seminarians in Vietnam and sponsors 150 in the United States.

On April 7, 2017, the congregation was renamed to the Congregation of the Mother of the Redeemer upon the recommendation of the Congregation for the Evangelization of Peoples, due to the "theological ambiguity" of the title Co-Redemptrix.

=== United States Assumption Province ===
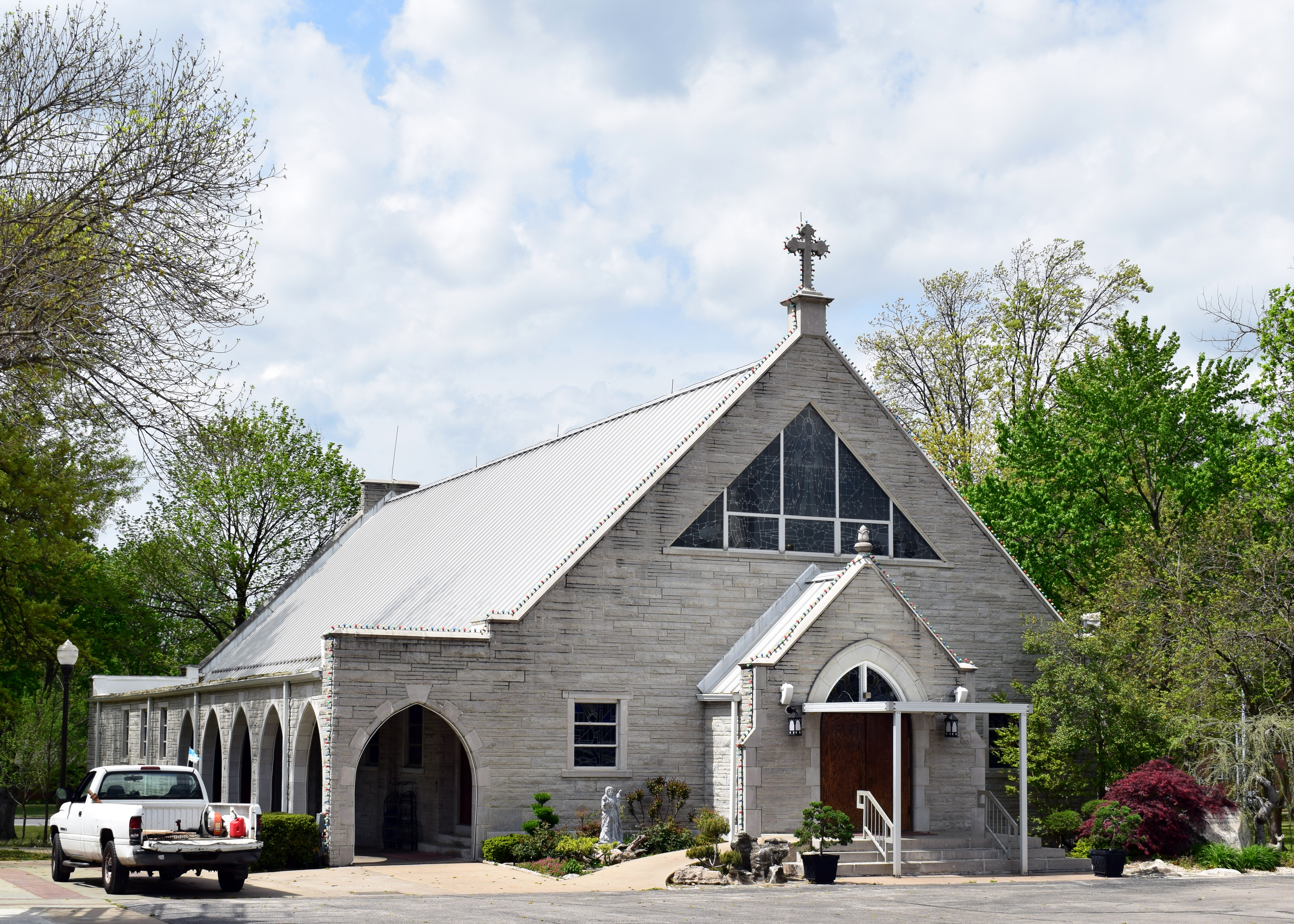
Shrine of the Immaculate Heart of Mary (Carthage, Missouri)

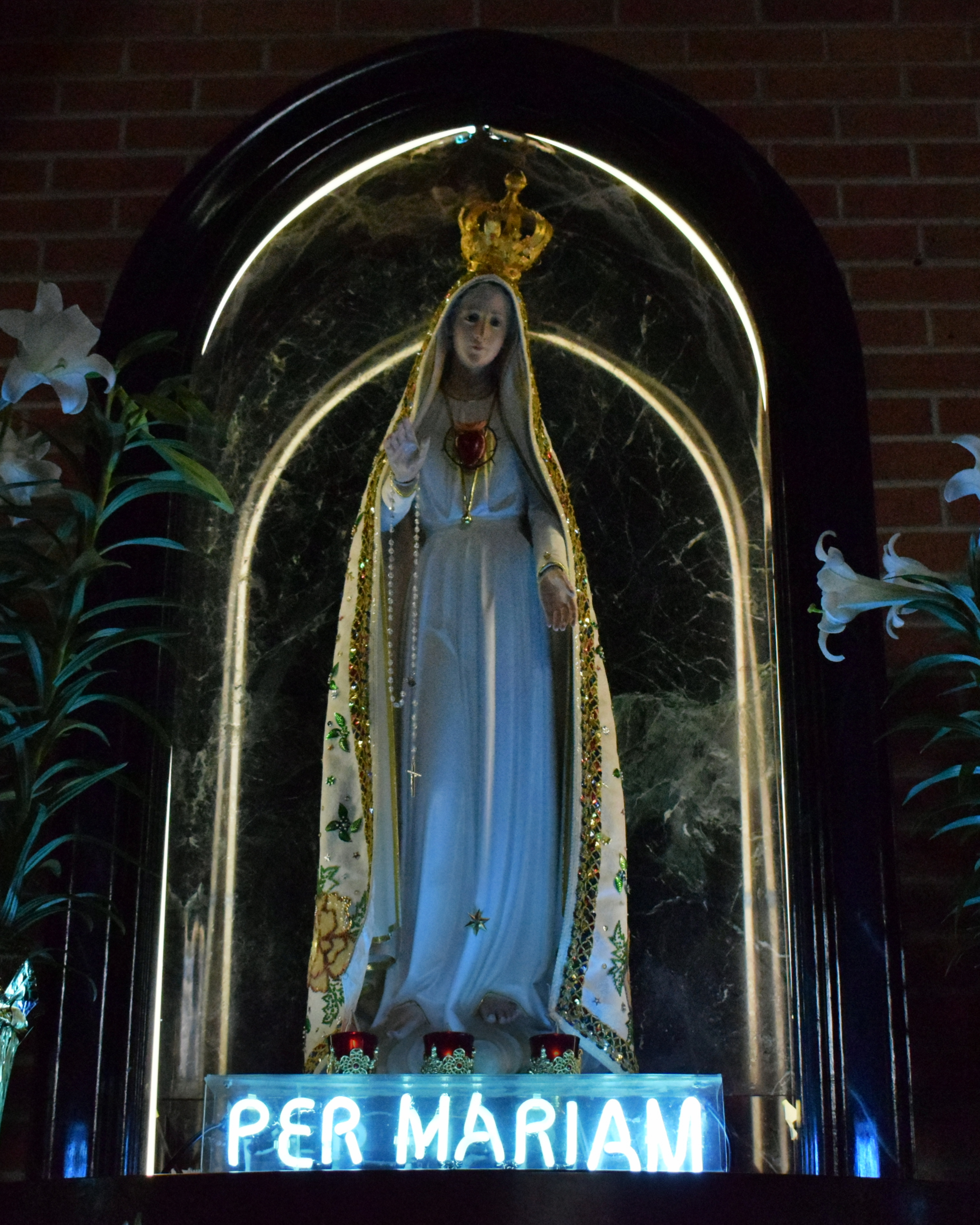
International Pilgrim Statue in the Shrine of the Immaculate Heart

On April 30, 1975, 185 members – about half of the Congregation – left Vietnam as boat people just before the Fall of Saigon. They arrived in the United States at Fort Chaffee and other Operation New Arrivals refugee camps. Cardinal Bernard Francis Law, then Bishop of Springfield–Cape Girardeau, sponsored the priests and brothers, inviting them to purchase a vacant Oblates of Mary Immaculate seminary, Our Lady of the Ozarks College, for a nominal price of $1, to use as their U.S. monastery. Between June 30 and September 3, 1975, nine priests, 154 brothers, and four novices arrived in Carthage, a predominantly Protestant town. The Overseas Congregation of the Mother Coredemptrix received formal recognition from the Congregation for the Evangelization of Peoples on September 16, 1975, and the congregation's Assumption Province (Vietnamese: Tỉnh Dòng Đồng Công Hoa Kỳ) was established on October 25, 1980, with Barnabus Maria Nguyễn Đức Kiên as the provincial. The Holy See gave the province a mission to minister to the Vietnamese American community.

In 1978, the Congregation organized the inaugural Marian Days at the Carthage shrine. Around 1,500 Vietnamese Catholics from the surrounding area participated. In 1984, a statue of Our Lady of Fatima, also known as the International Pilgrim Statue, was enshrined in the Immaculate Heart of Mary Shrine at the Carthage monastery. The statue is removed once a year during the Marian Days celebration for a procession around Carthage.

Archbishop Pierre Martin Ngô Đình Thục died at the monastery in 1984.

== See also ==
- Catholicism in Vietnam
- Vietnamese American
