= Leggett & Platt =

American manufacturing company

Leggett & Platt, Incorporated
- Type: Public
- Traded as: NYSE: LEG; S&P 600 component
- Industry: Residential Bedding and Furniture; Automotive Seating; Industrial Materials
- Founded: 1883; 143 years ago
- Headquarters: Carthage, Missouri, U.S.
- Key people: Karl Glassman(CEO)
- Revenue: ▼US$4.06 billion (2025)
- Net income: ▲US$235 million (2025)
- Number of employees: approx. 19,300 (2023)
- Website: leggett.com

Leggett & Platt (L&P), based in Carthage, Missouri, is an American diversified manufacturer that designs and produces various engineered components and products that can be found in homes and automobiles. The firm was founded in 1883, and consists of 15 business units, 20,000 employee-partners, and 135 manufacturing facilities located in 18 countries.

== Leggett management ==
As of November 2025, senior corporate executives included:

- Karl Glassman, CEO and President
- Benjamin M. Burns, EVP and CFO
- R. Samuel Smith, EVP, President- Specialized Products and Furniture, Flooring, & Textile Products
- J. Tyson Hagale, EVP, President - Bedding Products
- Ryan M. Kleiboeker, EVP, Chief Strategic Planning Officer
- Jennifer J. Davis, EVP General Counsel
- Lindey N. Odaffer, EVP and CHRO
- Tammy Trent, SVP and CAO
- Steve West, VP Investor Relations

== Board of directors ==
Director	Joined In	Position	Company
Angela Barbee	2022	Retired SVP, Technology and Global R&D	Weber, Inc.
Robert E. Brunner	2009	Retired Executive VP	Illinois Tool Works, Inc.
Mary Campbell	2019	Chief Merchandising Officer	Qurate Retail Group
Karl G. Glassman	2002	Retired CEO	Leggett & Platt
Joseph W. McClanathan	2005	Retired President & CEO	Energizer Household Products Division of Energizer Holdings
Srikanth Padmanabhan	2018	Vice-president	Cummins Inc.
Jai Shah	2019	Group President	Masco Corporation
Phoebe A. Wood	2005	Principal	CompaniesWood

== Company history ==
J.P. Leggett

C.B. Platt

In 1883 in Carthage, Missouri, J.P. Leggett developed a new type of bedspring consisting of single cone spring wire coils, formed and interlaced, then mounted on a wood slat base. The bedspring could then be used as a base for the then-popular cotton, feather, or horsehair mattresses. Needing expertise in manufacturing and production, he recruited his soon-to-be brother-in-law, C.B. Platt, whose father owned and operated Platt Plow Works, into the partnership. Together, they produced the components of their Leggett & Platt bedspring, which was patented in 1885.

Bedspring vs. Innerspring
At the time of their invention, bedsprings referred to cone-shaped wire coiled springs, attached to a wooden slat foundation, used to support then-popular mattresses. These mattresses were typically made of horse hair, corn husks, cotton, feathers, or another soft material. Early bedsprings functioned similarly to today's box springs in their support of a mattress. However, box springs are rather rigid in structure, while bedsprings provide a more flexible surface.
Innersprings, by contrast, refer to the core system of wire springs that, along with various types of foam and other padding materials, comprise the insides of today's mattress. The mattress is usually coupled with a box spring to create a sleep set. Innersprings can be coiled springs laced together, continuous coil springs, or individually encased springs, that support a person sleeping on the mattress.

The Carthage market for their new product was very limited. To expand the market to a wider region, Platt and George Leggett, brother of J. P. Leggett, would load a horse-drawn wagon with bedsprings and travel to surrounding communities. Often, to conserve space, they would load the springs and slats separately into the wagon and assemble them in a store or on an adjacent sidewalk. The partnership prospered, and the business was incorporated in 1901.

The Platt Plow Works

The company built its first factory and offices in Carthage in 1890. The workforce at that time consisted of the two partners and five employees. Soon after completion of the Carthage plant, a second factory was built in Louisville, Kentucky. During the next 50 years, three more factories were built. Demand for the company's improved bedsprings was rising, and a second plant was built in Carthage in 1925. The new, much larger plant was located next to a railroad to allow for expanded shipments of products and supplies. In 1942, an additional factory was built in Winchester, Kentucky, which was subsequently consolidated with the Louisville plant. For some time, Texas had proven to be a main market outlet, and in 1947, a major factory was built in Ennis, Texas. By 1947, Leggett & Platt consisted of 4 plants and 500 employees.

Although available in various models and continuously improved upon, bedsprings were practically the only product Leggett & Platt offered until 1933. However, in that year the company began to manufacture springs for innerspring mattresses, which were relatively new products in the industry and growing in popularity. Thereafter, the company slowly began to diversify its products within the bedding industry by producing rollaway beds and folding metal cots, along with bed frames and bed rails.

Innerspring mattress components

In 1960, Harry M. Cornell Jr., J.P. Leggett's grandson, was elected President and CEO of the company, taking over for his father (who was Leggett's son-in-law). The company's total sales in 1960 were approximately $7 million from three states: Kentucky, Texas, and Missouri. Determining the course and future of the company became management's primary objective. Following an extensive evaluation of the company and its potential, Cornell and his management partners concluded that Leggett & Platt's best opportunities for profitable growth lay in a strategy of specializing in manufacturing, marketing, and distributing a broad and growing line of components and related products, first nationally and eventually on a worldwide basis. Key drivers of future sales and earnings would include aggressive internal growth initiatives, coupled with an active and ongoing acquisition program.

J.P. Leggett's original bedspring and patent

Even greater success followed, and Leggett & Platt became known as "the components people." Leggett & Platt stock was first traded over the counter in 1967. Twelve years later, on June 25, 1979, top management was present in New York City to witness the stock's first day listed on the New York Stock Exchange. In 1999, the company became part of the S&P 500 Index.

Today, Leggett & Platt has 135 manufacturing facilities in 18 countries.

== Timeline ==
- 1883: Joseph P. Leggett develops and patents the first successful spiral steel coil bedspring, then forms a business partnership with Cornelius B. Platt, a blacksmith who operates the C.D. Platt Plow Works plant in Carthage, Missouri.
- 1885: Leggett receives a patent for improvements on the coiled bedspring. J.P. Leggett and C.B. Platt begin manufacturing coiled bedsprings at the Platt Plow Works plant.
- 1890: The first factory and offices are built in Carthage, Missouri. The workforce consists of the two partners and five employees. Harry Platt, a brother of C.B. Platt, opens a franchise factory in Louisville, Kentucky.
- 1901: The partnership of J.P. Leggett and C.B. Platt is incorporated under the name "Leggett & Platt Spring Bed & Manufacturing Company".
- 1933: Leggett & Platt begins to manufacture innerspring units at its Carthage plant.
- 1942: Leggett & Platt survives World War II by working on defense contracts.
- 1960: Harry M. Cornell, Jr., (grandson of J.P. Leggett) becomes president and CEO; he begins implementing a new corporate strategy to broaden the line of component products for the bedding and furniture industries, expand geographically, and offer compatible products directly to furniture stores.
- 1967: Leggett & Platt's IPO (initial public offering) of 50,000 shares of stock (at $10 per share) and $1 million of convertible subordinated debentures occurs; the stock is listed over the counter.
- 1971: Leggett & Platt stock is listed on the then-newly established National Association of Securities Dealers Automated Quotation System (NASDAQ), and the company achieves more than $1 million in net earnings.
- 1976: Leggett & Platt exceeds the $100 million sales for the first time.
- 1977: Construction begins on a new corporate headquarters outside Carthage.
- 1979: Leggett & Platt is listed on the NYSE (New York Stock Exchange), stock symbol "LEG".
- 1983: Leggett celebrates 100 years of operation.
- 1990: Revenues exceed $1 billion for the first time.
- 1999: Leggett is included in the S&P 500 Index.
- 2007: New strategic direction announced in November.
- 2016: Reset to strategic direction announced in September.
- 2019: Acquired Elite Comfort Solutions for $1.25 billion, the largest acquisition to date, adding specialty foam and private label finished mattress capabilities and expanding its position in the bedding market.
- 2021: Increased annual dividend for the 50th consecutive year. Became part of the S&P MidCap 400 in December.

== Executive leadership: past & present ==
Executive	Years of service
J.P. Leggett & C.B. Platt, Partnership	1883–1901
J.P. Leggett	1901–1921
C.B. Platt	1921–1929
J.P. Leggett, Jr.	1929–1933
F.B. Williams	1933–1938
George S. Beimdiek, Sr.	1938–1953
Harry M. Cornell, Sr.	1953–1960
Harry M. Cornell, Jr.	1960–1999
Felix E. Wright	1999–2006
David S. Haffner	2006–2015
Karl G. Glassman	2016–2021
J. Mitchell Dolloff	2022–2024
Karl G. Glassman	2024–Present

== LEG stock ==
- 1967 – Leggett & Platt IPO of 50,000 shares of stock at a price of $10 per share; the stock is traded over the counter
- 1971 – Leggett's stock is listed on the NASDAQ
- 1979 – Leggett is listed on the New York Stock Exchange, trading under symbol "LEG"
- 2024 - Leggett slashes the dividend to $0.05
- 2026 - Leggett merges with Somnigroup (SGI)

History of stock splits:

- May 13, 1969: 5-for-3
- Jan. 15, 1973: 3-for-2
- Sept. 29, 1978: 3-for-2
- Aug. 26, 1983: 2-for-1
- Mar. 14, 1986: 3-for-2
- Jun. 15, 1992: 2-for-1
- Sept. 15, 1995: 2-for-1
- Jun. 15, 1998: 2-for-1

== Philanthropy ==
Leggett & Platt is a signature sponsor of the Seena Magowitz Foundation, helping support the mission to eradicate of pancreatic cancer.
