= Jasper County Courthouse (Missouri) =

- U.S. National Register of Historic Places
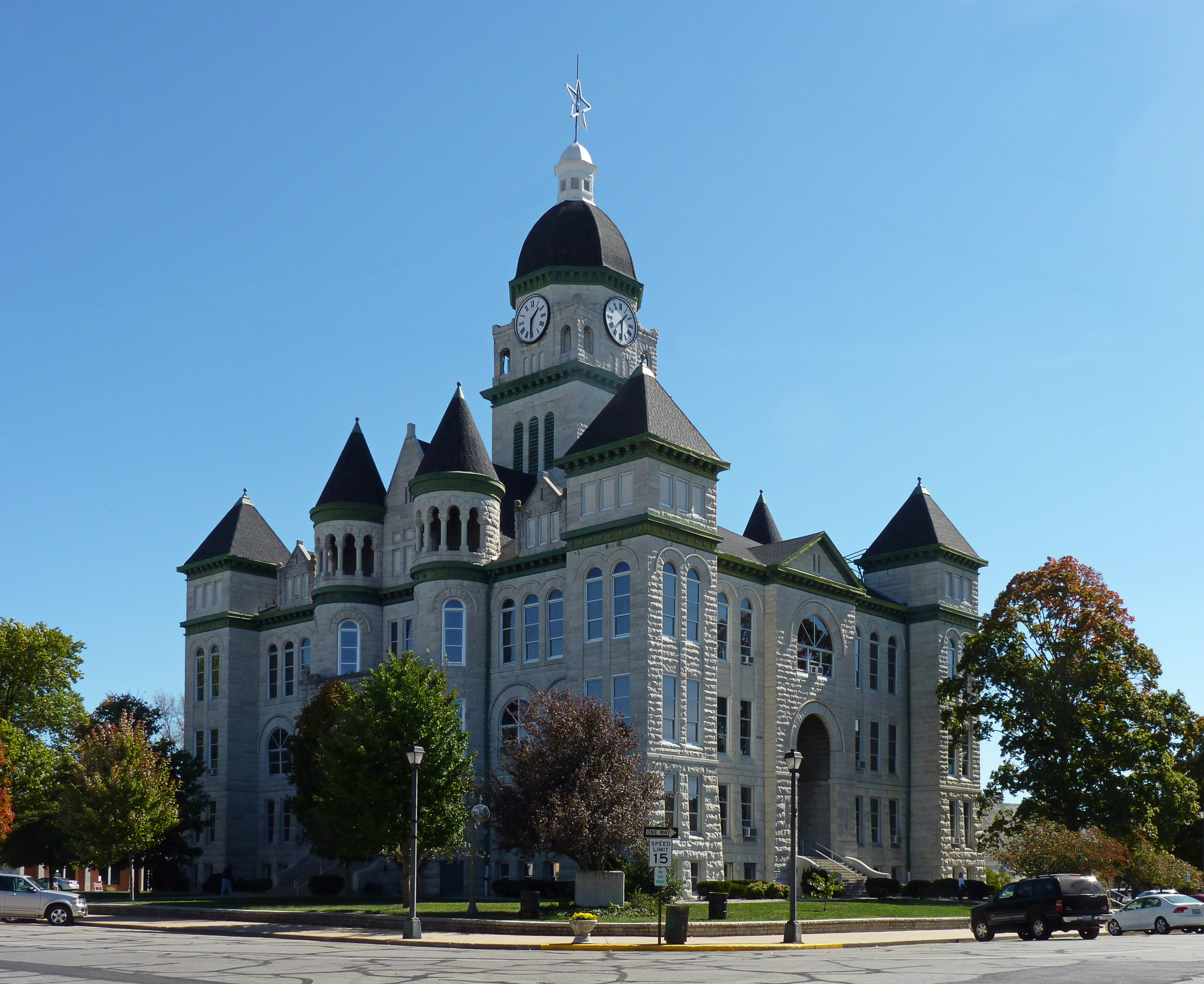

- Location within Missouri Location within the United States
- Location: 302 S Main St., Carthage, Missouri
- Coordinates: 37°10′45″N 94°18′37″W
- Area: 9.9 acres (4.0 ha)
- Built: 1894–1895
- Architect: M.A. Orlopp, Jr.
- Architectural style: Romanesque Revival, Richardsonian Romanesque
- NRHP reference No.: 73001041
- Added to NRHP: February 8, 1973

The Jasper County Courthouse is a 176 ft tall historic courthouse located in Carthage, Jasper County, Missouri. The Courthouse is built on the site of the original Jasper County Courthouse which was burned in the Battle of Carthage during the American Civil War. Built from 1894 - 1895, the Jasper County Courthouse was designed by architect Max A. Orlopp Jr. in the Romanesque Revival-style and built using local Carthage marble, it is the second most photographed building in Missouri. The Courthouse remains in use by Jasper County officials.

== History ==
The first Jasper County Courthouse was a one-story brick building built in 1842 by Levi H. Jenkins for $398.50. Following the completion of the first Courthouse, it immediately showed problems with the growing population and a larger, two story courthouse was completed in 1854. The Courthouse briefly served as a hospital during the American Civil War, but was burned down during the Battle of Carthage.

For the next 30 years, Jasper County Courts moved to a variety of locations including a school, a remodeled jail, an opera house, and a Baptist church. It was until 1891 that major steps were taken to establish a Courthouse in Jasper County and although the cities of Joplin and Carthage both wanted to have the new courthouse built in their respective cities, Carthage ultimately got their courthouse built at a cost of $100,000.

The new Courthouse was designed by architect Max A. Orlopp Jr. who also designed the Dallas County Courthouse in Dallas, Texas. The north and south facades of the courthouse are 133 ft 8 in long. The east and west facades are 106 ft 8 in long. The lantern is 176 ft from the ground. Construction began on Aug. 21, 1894 and the building was dedicated on Oct. 9, 1895. The county clerk at the time the courthouse was approved was Annie White Baxter, the first woman to be elected a county clerk in the United States. As a member of county government, she exerted a significant degree of influence in the planning of the building, and she is memorialized on the grounds.

As originally built, the Jasper County Courthouse had a black clock face, but was eventually painted white in the 1950s. In the 1960s, a large illuminated star was placed on top of the Courthouse as “a guiding star — a star of peace,” according to a brochure that was printed commemorating the ceremony. In 1973, the Courthouse was listed on the National Register of Historic Places.

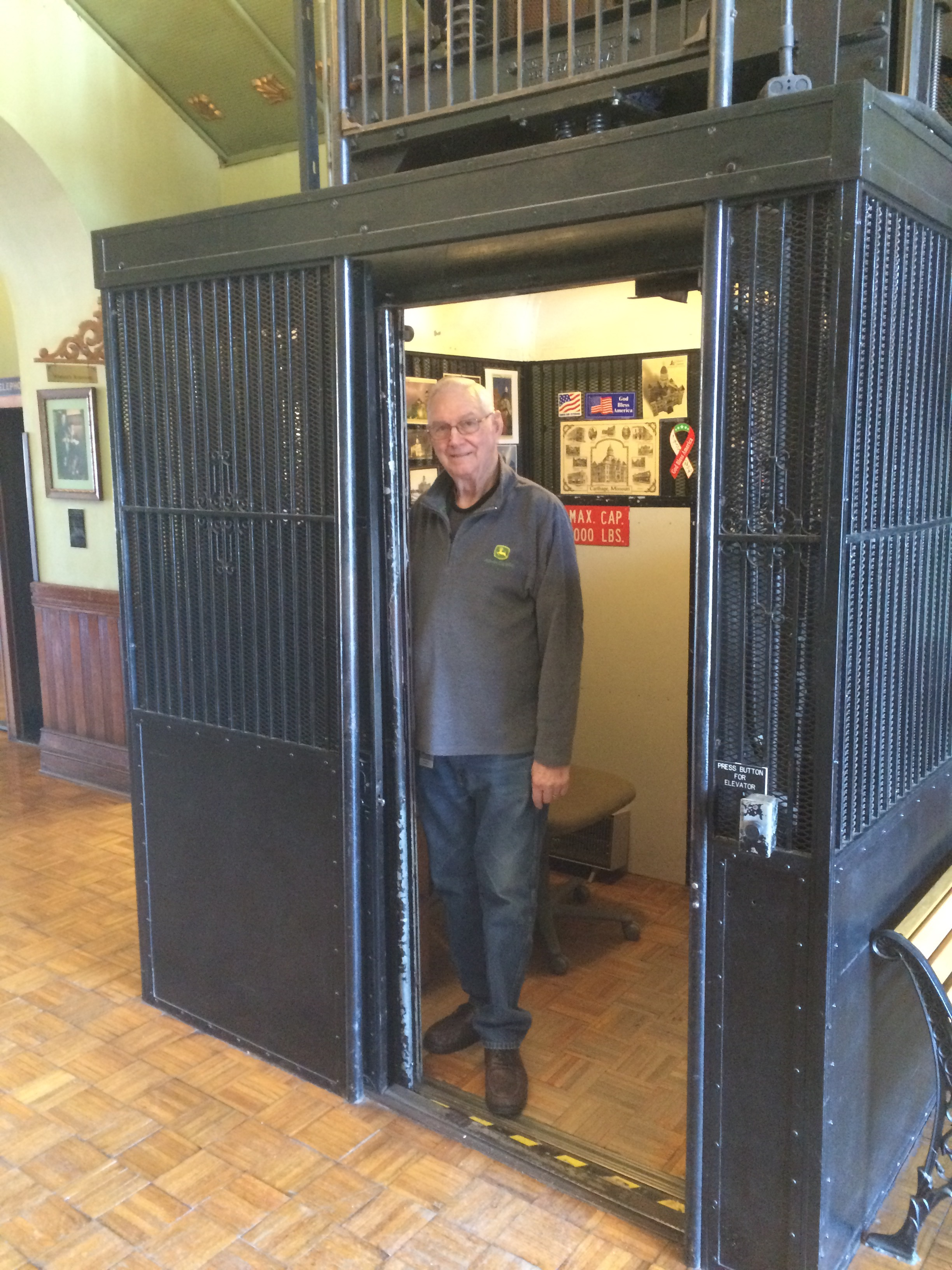
The antique original elevator with operator
