= Marian Days =

Vietnamese American annual Catholic pilgrimage

Marian Days Ngày Thánh Mẫu
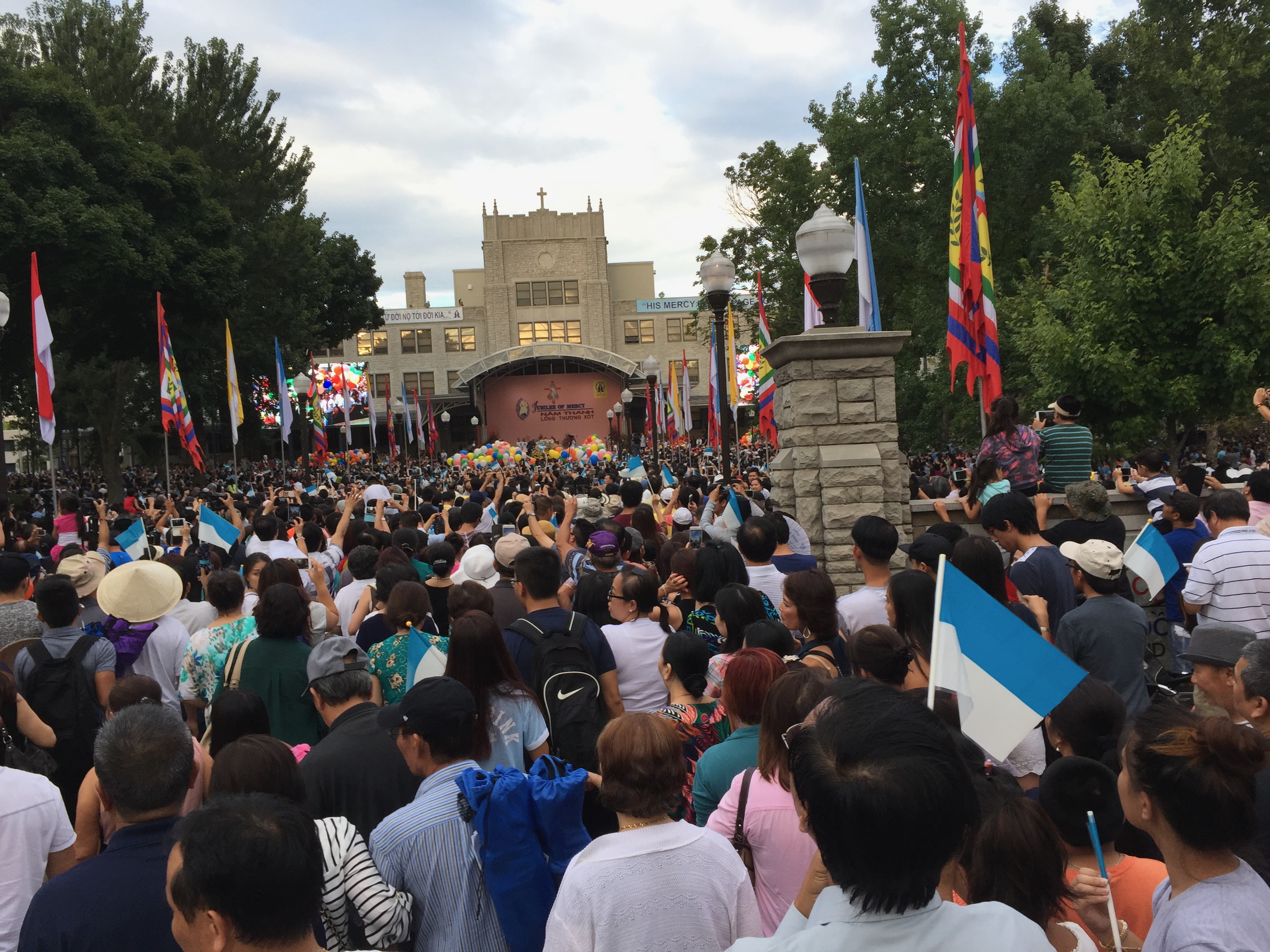
- Ceremony after the solemn procession in honor of Our Lady of Fatima in 2016
- Genre: Religious and cultural
- Begins: Thursday of first weekend in August
- Ends: Sunday of the first weekend in August
- Frequency: Annual
- Locations: Carthage, Missouri, United States
- Coordinates: 37.1565°N 94.3095°W
- Years active: 47
- Inaugurated: 1978
- Most recent: August 6–9, 2026
- Next event: August 5–8, 2027
- Participants: c. 100,000
- Organizer: Congregation of the Mother of the Redeemer
- Website: www.ngaythanhmau.net

The Marian Days (Vietnamese: Ngày Thánh Mẫu, (Note: Using a title for the Virgin Mary in Vietnamese Catholicism, also used for female deities in various other Vietnamese religions.) colloquially Đại hội Thánh Mẫu) is the main festival and pilgrimage for Vietnamese American Catholics and the largest Vietnamese event outside Vietnam. The annual event, inaugurated in 1978, ordinarily takes place on the first weekend in August in honor of the Virgin Mary on the campus of the Congregation of the Mother of the Redeemer (CRM) in Carthage, Missouri.

Tens of thousands of attendees come annually from the United States and other countries across the globe, including Canada, Vietnam, and various parts of Europe. Attendees either opt to camp in parks and yards or fill up local hotels, which additionally boosts the economy of the city and neighboring ones as well. Some residents of Carthage have disapproved of the event, and gang activity in the 1990s and early 2000s has resulted in gun and knife violence. However, many residents look forward to the festival each year and attend to partake in Vietnamese cuisine.

Though the event is religious in nature, it is also a cultural one that brings Vietnamese families across the United States and the world together in a central location and offers them a way to reconnect with their culture.

== History ==
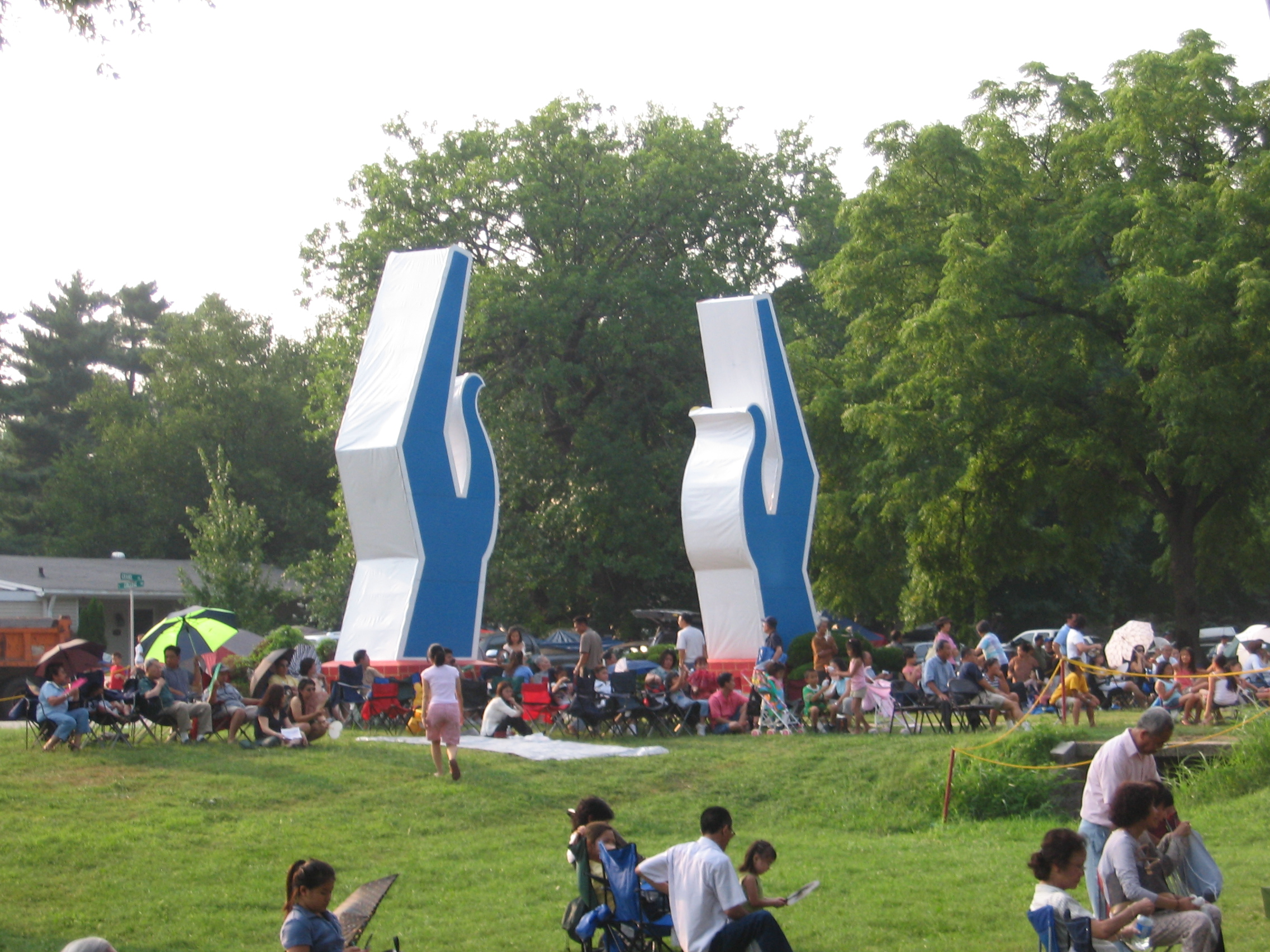
The entrance gate of Marian Days 2007 features praying hands, the symbol of the event, which often includes a rosary.

The Congregation of the Mother of the Redeemer's charism or mission is dedicated to promoting the devotion of the Virgin Mary, especially the Immaculate Heart of Mary and the message of Fatima. In Vietnam, days of reparation to the Immaculate Heart were held on first Saturdays, in part as a way of asking the Virgin Mary for peace in the Vietnam War. After the Fall of Saigon in 1975, Cardinal Bernard Francis Law, then Bishop of Springfield–Cape Girardeau, sponsored the priests and brothers, inviting them to take over a vacant Oblates of Mary Immaculate seminary, Our Lady of the Ozarks College, to use as their US monastery.

Wanting to continue the tradition and charism from Vietnam, the Congregation organized the inaugural Marian Days on June 3, 1978, as a "Day of Reparation to the Immaculate Heart of Mary". Around 1,500 Vietnamese Catholics participated in the one-day retreat at the former campus of Our Lady of the Ozarks College. The 1979 event welcomed Cardinal John Carberry, who imparted a special blessing from Pope John Paul II to the event. The gathering was expanded to a weekend and especially dedicated to commemorating the consecration of Vietnam to Mary in 1960.

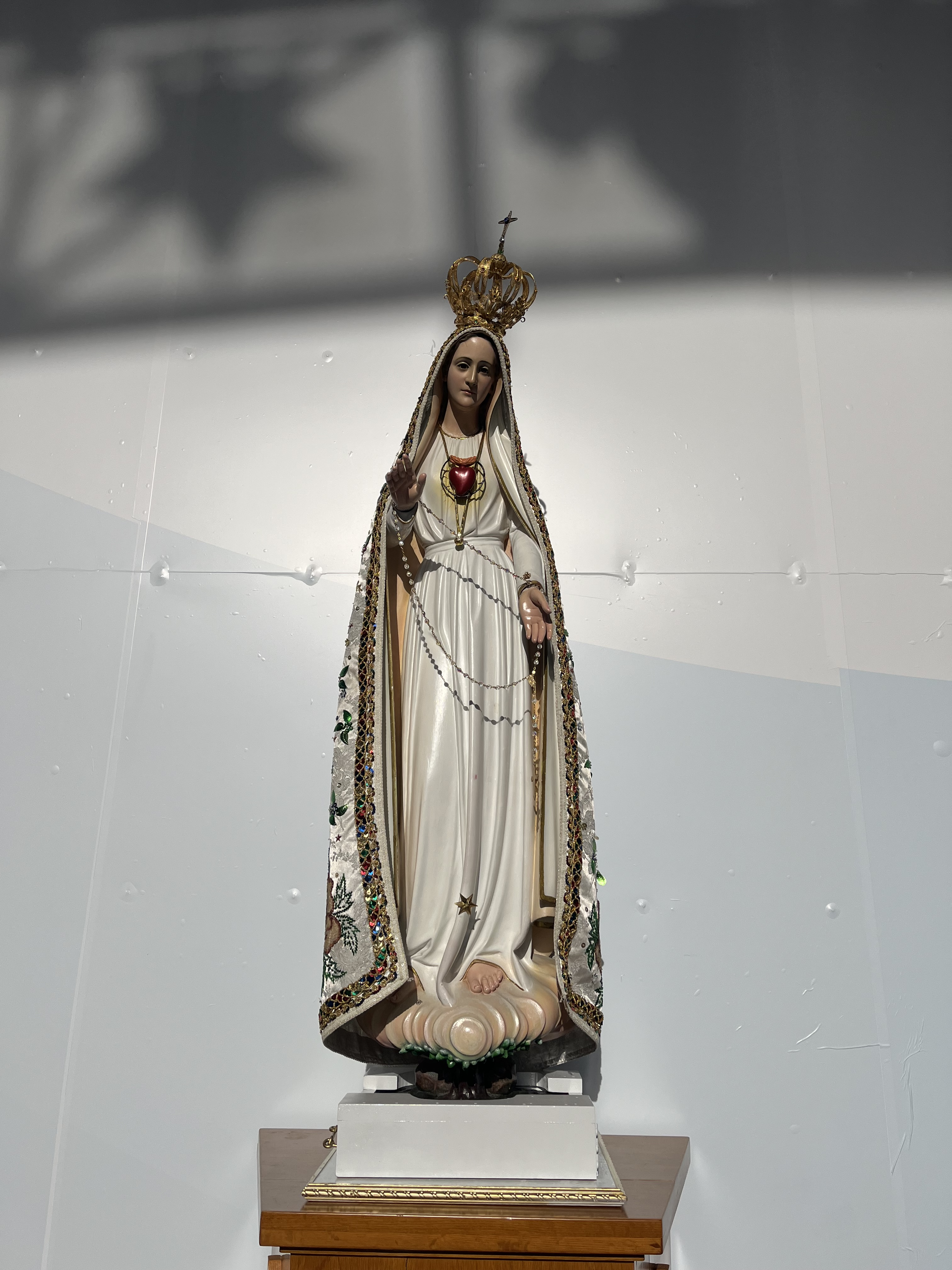
The Pilgrim Statue of Our Lady of Fatima, the central icon of the event since 1984 when the CRM was given custody of the statue.

In 1987, an estimated 35,000 Vietnamese people were said to have attended the festival, with one attendee describing it as a "religious New Year for Vietnamese refugees". Cardinal Nguyễn Văn Thuận attended and preached at the event in 1995. For the 2000 Marian Days, a large auditorium and pastoral center dedicated to the Vietnamese Martyrs was inaugurated for the growing number of attendees for the purpose of workshops and seminars.

The Marian Days celebration was canceled in 2020 and 2021 due to the COVID-19 pandemic before returning in 2022.

The Diocese of Orange launched a West Coast version of Marian Days in 2022, which brought in 15,000 people to the Christ Cathedral campus in honor of Our Lady of La Vang.

== Event ==
Marian Days are celebrated from the first Thursday in August to the following Sunday at the former Our Lady of the Ozarks College site. Crowds in recent years have been estimated between 75,000 and 100,000, outnumbering Carthage's own population of around 12,500. Participants come from the United States and other countries around the world, including Canada, Vietnam, Thailand, and Holland.

The celebration incorporates daily Mass, confessions, Eucharistic adoration, vocational talks, and seminars. In addition, food stalls, pop-up religious goods stores, confessional stations, and booths for various religious congregations are sprinkled throughout the campus.

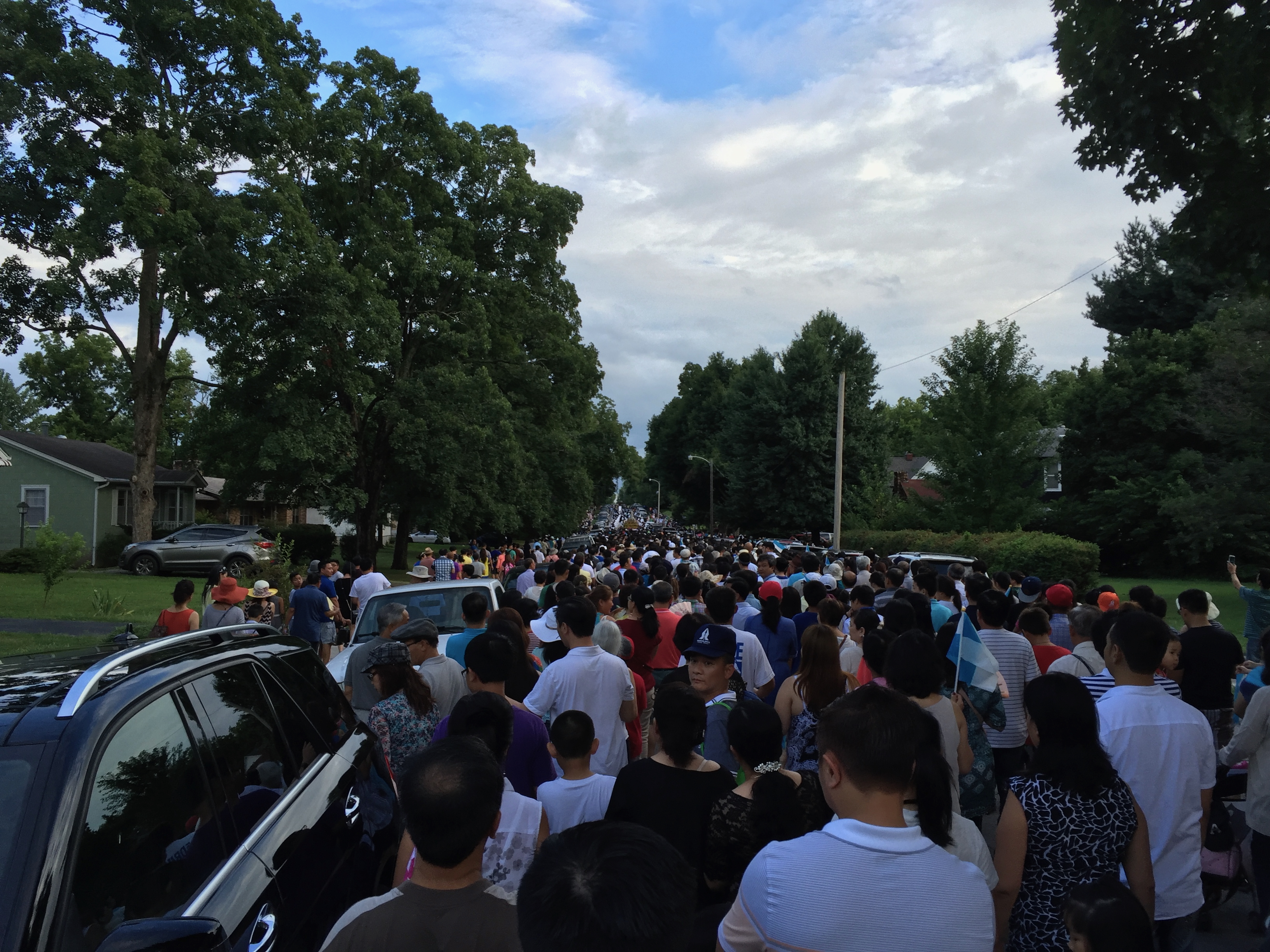
The annual procession in honor of Our Lady of Fatima follows Carthage streets.

Saturday evening celebrations begin with a procession honoring Our Lady of Fatima. Firecrackers are lit as the procession comes to a close, followed by blue and white balloons, which are released in honor of Our Lady of Fatima, as well as red and yellow balloons in colors representing the flag of South Vietnam, a symbol of anticommunism. The celebration culminates in a Pontifical High Mass in honor of the Immaculate Heart of Mary. Following the Mass, a music and entertainment program features acts by Asia Entertainment, Thúy Nga Productions, and others.

== Accommodations ==
Each year, nearly every hotel or motel within a 50-mile (80 km) radius of Carthage fills to capacity, with bookings as far as Northwest Arkansas. Many attendees book as much as a year in advance. Others prefer the more communal experience of camping in tents or campers on or near the festival grounds. One local RV park is used once a year, only for Marian Days. While some residents do not look forward to the festival each year and put up signs warning visitors to stay away, others enjoy the annual influx of visitors, hosting families in their homes or allowing them to camp in their yards in exchange for monetary or in-kind donations.

== Cultural significance ==
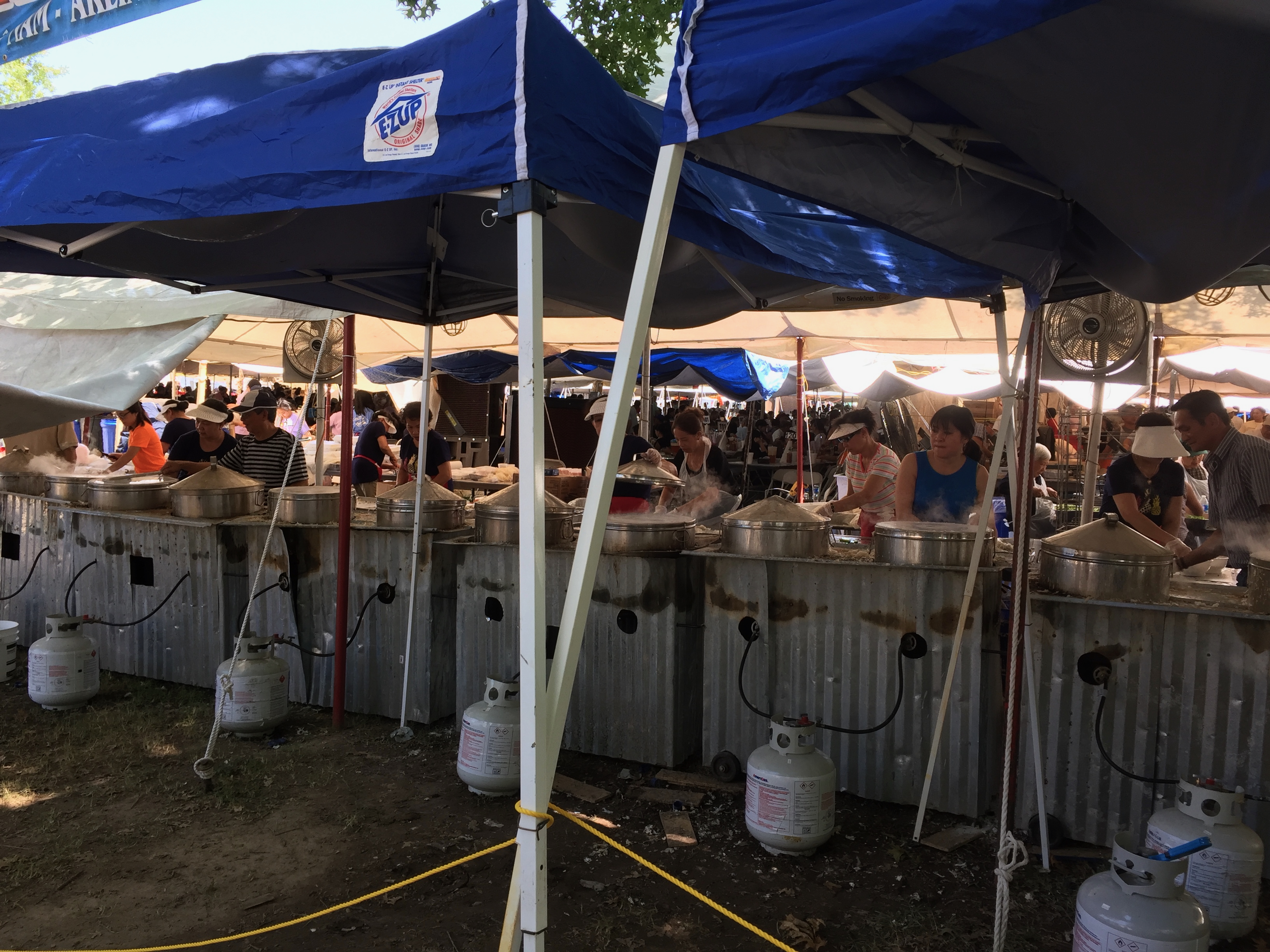
A row of bánh cuốn steaming stations at a food stall on the festival grounds.

The Marian Days celebration is a central part of Vietnamese Catholic culture in the United States. For many extended families spread across the country, it is an opportunity to reunite in a central location. Parents also see it as an important opportunity for youth to reconnect with their heritage. Mass and other events are held in both Vietnamese and English. Food options mix the two cultures, featuring "as many fried Twinkies as pho". Bubble tea and bánh bao are also prominent throughout the event. Vietnamese food is a draw for many local residents who also attend the event.

== Economic impact ==
Marian Days is the largest annual event in the Joplin metropolitan area. Annual attendance estimates range from 80,000 to 100,000. The Carthage Chamber of Commerce estimates that the event brings in more than $150,000 in sales tax revenue in Carthage alone. The Congregation pays the Carthage Police Department one-third of the cost of overtime pay for security.

== Incidents ==
An increase in the number of religiously unaffiliated Asian youth attending the festival in the mid-1980s coincided with an increase in car theft and extortion attempts. By 1990, members of a Vietnamese gang were attending Marian Days looking for refuge and to connect with other gang members; the festival was seen as a neutral ground where parties would leave each other alone. Police began to bring in collections of mug shots and set up checkpoints to search for weapons and suspects. As a result of these efforts, arrests have been made at the festival of those wanted for robbery and murder. Local, state, and federal police, some members of gang task forces, patrol the festival.

During the 1995 Marian Days, a 17-year-old from Texas was shot and killed, collateral damage in a shooting outside a Joplin motel early Sunday morning. Their intended target, a 20-year-old from Louisiana with gang associations, was also left wounded in the leg. A 16-year-old teen was arrested in association with the incident in Louisiana later that month.

In 2003, a gang-related stabbing took place at the prayer garden on the campus early that Friday morning. Four men, believed to be associated with a gang from Oklahoma City, were arrested and charged with first-degree assault. One of the four was also believed to be charged with the murder. The area was left without a trace of the violent incident by Saturday and events continued as scheduled. After the stabbing, people affiliated with gangs were banned from the festival and checkpoints were added to screen cars entering the festival complex. Gang-related activities decreased each year from 2003 to 2016, authorities said.

In 2008, a charter bus carrying 55 people from Houston to Carthage crashed in Sherman, Texas, killing 17 and injuring almost 40. Despite not taking place near the campus, when it was announced that morning before Mass by a Congregation priest, he and the crowd were left overcome with emotion, with some even left weeping. The Congregation also announced its intentions to provide transportation for any family of the victims who would like to return to Texas. Prayers for the victims and their loved ones were frequently called upon throughout the rest of the event as well.

A mournful atmosphere set over the rest of the event, and heavy rainfall started the day after, although all activities continued as scheduled. One exception, however, was that the Saturday Pontifical Mass was cancelled and split between three locations instead due to the continuous rainfall.

== See also ==
- Catholic Church in Vietnam
- Veneration of Mary in the Catholic Church
