= KDMO =

- Carthage, Missouri; United States
- Broadcast area: Joplin, Missouri
- Frequency: 1490 kHz
- Branding: Fabulous 1490 KDMO

Programming
- Format: Adult standards
- Affiliations: CNN Radio

Ownership
- Owner: Carthage Broadcasting Company, Inc.
- Sister stations: KMXL

History
- First air date: June 3, 1947

Technical information
- Licensing authority: FCC
- Facility ID: 9216
- Class: C
- Power: 1,000 watts (unlimited)
- Transmitter coordinates: 37°10′58.00″N 94°21′43.00″W
- Translator: 93.5 K228FS (Carthage)

Links
- Public license information: Public file; LMS

KDMO (1490 AM) is an American radio station broadcasting an adult standards format; during the holidays the station plays Christmas music. It is licensed to Carthage, Missouri, and serves the greater Joplin, Missouri, area. The station is owned by Carthage Broadcasting Company, Inc., and features programming from CNN Radio.

Unusual among AM stations, KDMO has been broadcasting music continuously since 1947. For most of its 70-plus year history the station aired Easy Listening music, Country, or a mixture of both. The station's motto is, "Too cool for FM."
