= Changing World Technologies =

American synthetic fuel company

Changing World Technologies (CWT), a privately held synthetic fuel company, was founded in August 1997 by Brian S. Appel, who also was chief executive officer of CWT and its subsidiaries. Through Mr. Appel's technology company, CWT was granted a license to operate. CWT was started primarily to develop and commercialize the thermal depolymerization technology, now referred to by the company as "thermal conversion process" or TCP. The process produces renewable diesel fuel oil (RDO) from agricultural wastes including fats, oils, and greases (FOG); dissolved air flotations (DAF); waste greases; offal; animal carcasses; and other organic-rich wastes.

In developing the business, CWT assisted in creating a portfolio of intellectual property and trade secrets to cover the technology and its various applications. The company has a license in the U.S. and around the globe, covering the use of their technology for applications ranging from agricultural waste (offal) to mixed plastics. In addition to the commercial-scale plant in Carthage, Missouri, CWT has a pilot facility in Philadelphia, Pennsylvania, where research, development, and deployment (RD&D) work is performed to refine the production processes and to develop capabilities to produce RDO from other various waste materials.

In 1998, CWT started a subsidiary, Thermo-Depolymerization Process, LLC (TDP), which developed a demonstration and test plant for the thermal depolymerization technology. The plant opened in 1999 in Philadelphia, Pennsylvania.

In 2008, West Hempstead, New York-based CWT received the Most Innovative Patent Award in the Environment & Energy category from the Long Island Technology Hall of Fame. Appel accepted the award at the 2008 awards ceremony on March 6.

On March 4, 2009, after a failed IPO attempt the previous month, Changing World Technologies and its three subsidiaries filed for Chapter 11 bankruptcy in the U.S. Bankruptcy Court for the Southern District of New York. The company effectively shut down its Carthage plant after it bought ConAgra's share of the facility. The company has since reorganized and has emerged from Chapter 11 in May 2010. CWT maintained the key members of the management team who developed the intellectual property, and designed and built the physical plants.

In 2011, the EPA designated CWT’s RDO, currently produced in the Missouri facility, as both a biomass-based diesel and advanced biofuel under the agency's Renewable Fuel Standards Program (RFS). This designation qualifies CWT’s RDO for assigned renewable identification numbers (RINs).

== Renewable Environmental Solutions, LLC ==
CWT’s main subsidiary is Renewable Environmental Solutions, LLC (RES), which was formed in 2000. It was a joint venture between ConAgra Foods and CWT to develop the processing of agricultural waste and low-value streams throughout the world. RES, now wholly owned by CWT, has the "first commercial biorefinery in the world that can make oil from a variety of waste streams, principally waste from the nearby ConAgra Butterball turkey processing plant in Carthage, Missouri. According to Biomass magazine, "CWT's thermal conversion process is a commercially viable method of reforming organic waste that converts approximately 250 tons of turkey offal and fats per day into approximately 500 barrels of renewable diesel.". With recent modifications and upgrades the RES plant can now process up to 300 tons per day of waste, producing 15 million gallons per year of RDO.

The plant in Carthage, Missouri, opened in May 2004. Almost immediately local residents started to complain about a foul odor. In December 2005, Missouri Governor Matt Blunt ordered the plant shut down. The company installed odor mitigation equipment and reopened the plant 3 months later. The plant was closed in March 2009 as the result of bankruptcy. In March 2011 the company indicated that it had gathered the financing to reopen the plant and that it planned to accept used fryer oil as feedstock.

In 2007, two residents filed a lawsuit against Renewable Environmental Solutions because they say they suffered due to odors from the operation. They also filed to expand the suit to a class action. A judge denied class action status on March 9, 2011.

As of February 2012, the Carthage plant is operational. Per the Carthage Press, incoming City Councilman Don Mclaughlin said that he hoped to be able to address what he says are odors still emanating from the Renewable Environmental Solutions plant, which started operating last year using new sources of material other than turkey offal to make fuel oil.

In December 2012, Brian Appel resigned as CEO to continue developing other applications for his technology company. Also in December 2012, engineer Dennis M. Danzik was hired by bank and investment holders of CWT to evaluate the Carthage plant. By early January 2013 Danzik had terminated most of the West Hempstead management. In April 2013, CWT was acquired by a Canadian firm, Ridgeline Energy Services, based in Calgary, Alberta.

== See also ==
- Biodiesel production
