= Little Annie Rooney (disambiguation) =

Little Annie Rooney is a comic strip launched in 1927.

Little Annie Rooney may also refer to:

- Little Annie Rooney (1925 film), 1925 live-action feature
- Little Annie Rooney (1931 film), 1931 animated short film
