= Carthage, Missouri =

City in Missouri, U.S.

- City
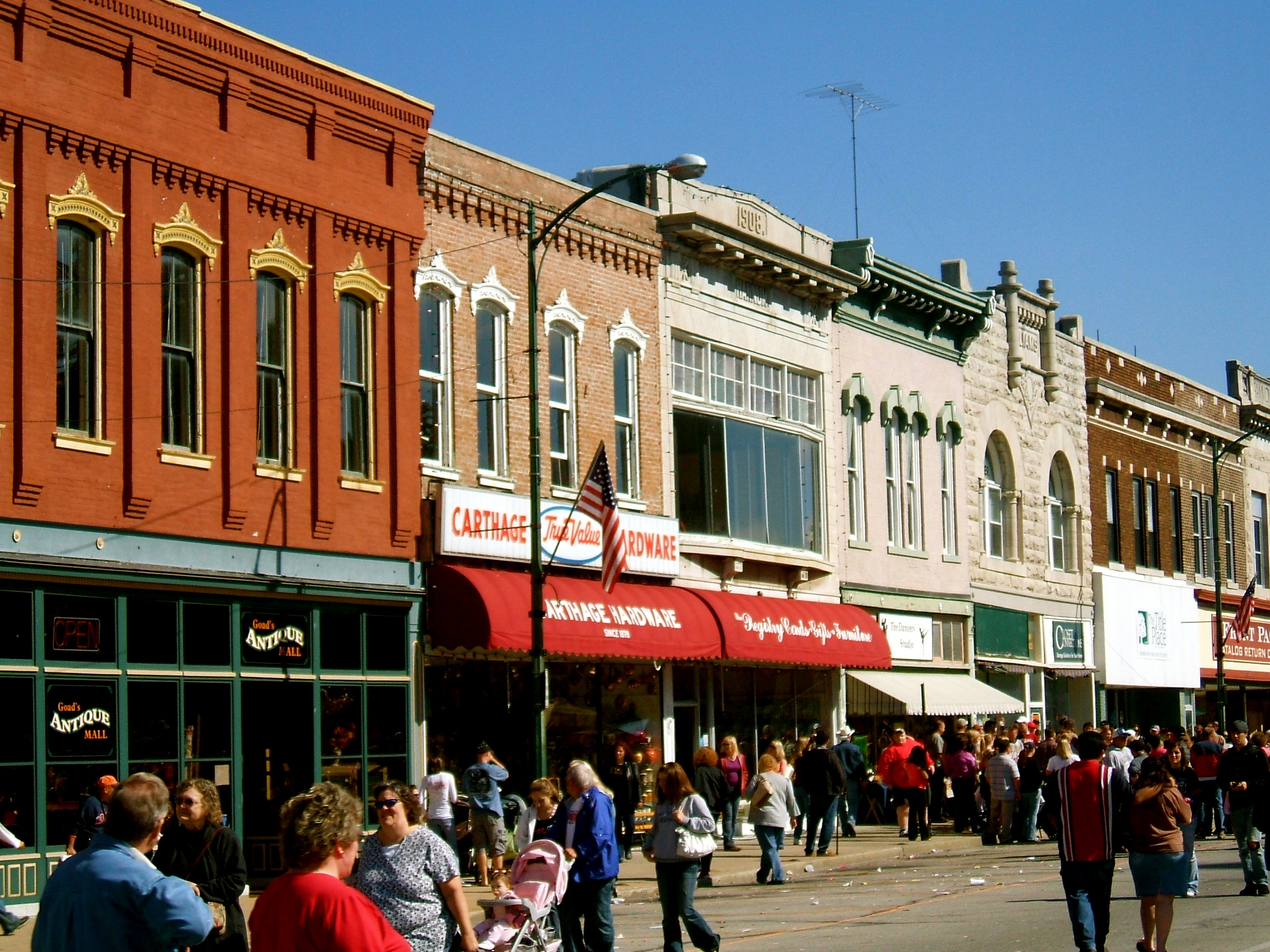
- Stores around the Courthouse square
- Nickname: America's Maple Leaf City
- Location within Jasper County and Missouri
- Coordinates: 37°09′38″N 94°18′22″W
- Country: United States
- State: Missouri
- County: Jasper

Government
  - Type: Mayor-council government
  - Mayor: David B. Flanigan
  - City Administrator: Traci Cox
  - Missouri Senate: Jill Carter (R)
  - Missouri House: Cathy Jo Loy
  - U.S. Congress: Eric Burlison

Area
  - Total: 11.95 sq mi (30.96 km^{2})
  - Land: 11.91 sq mi (30.84 km^{2})
  - Water: 0.046 sq mi (0.12 km^{2})
- Elevation: 1,040 ft (320 m)

Population (2020)
  - Total: 15,522
  - Density: 1,303.7/sq mi (503.38/km^{2})
- Time zone: UTC-6 (Central (CST))
  - Summer (DST): UTC-5 (CDT)
- ZIP code: 64836
- Area code: 417
- FIPS code: 29-11656
- GNIS feature ID: 2393760
- Website: http://carthagemo.gov/

Carthage is a city in Jasper County, Missouri, United States. The population was 15,522 as of the 2020 census. It is the county seat of Jasper County and is nicknamed "America's Maple Leaf City."

== History ==
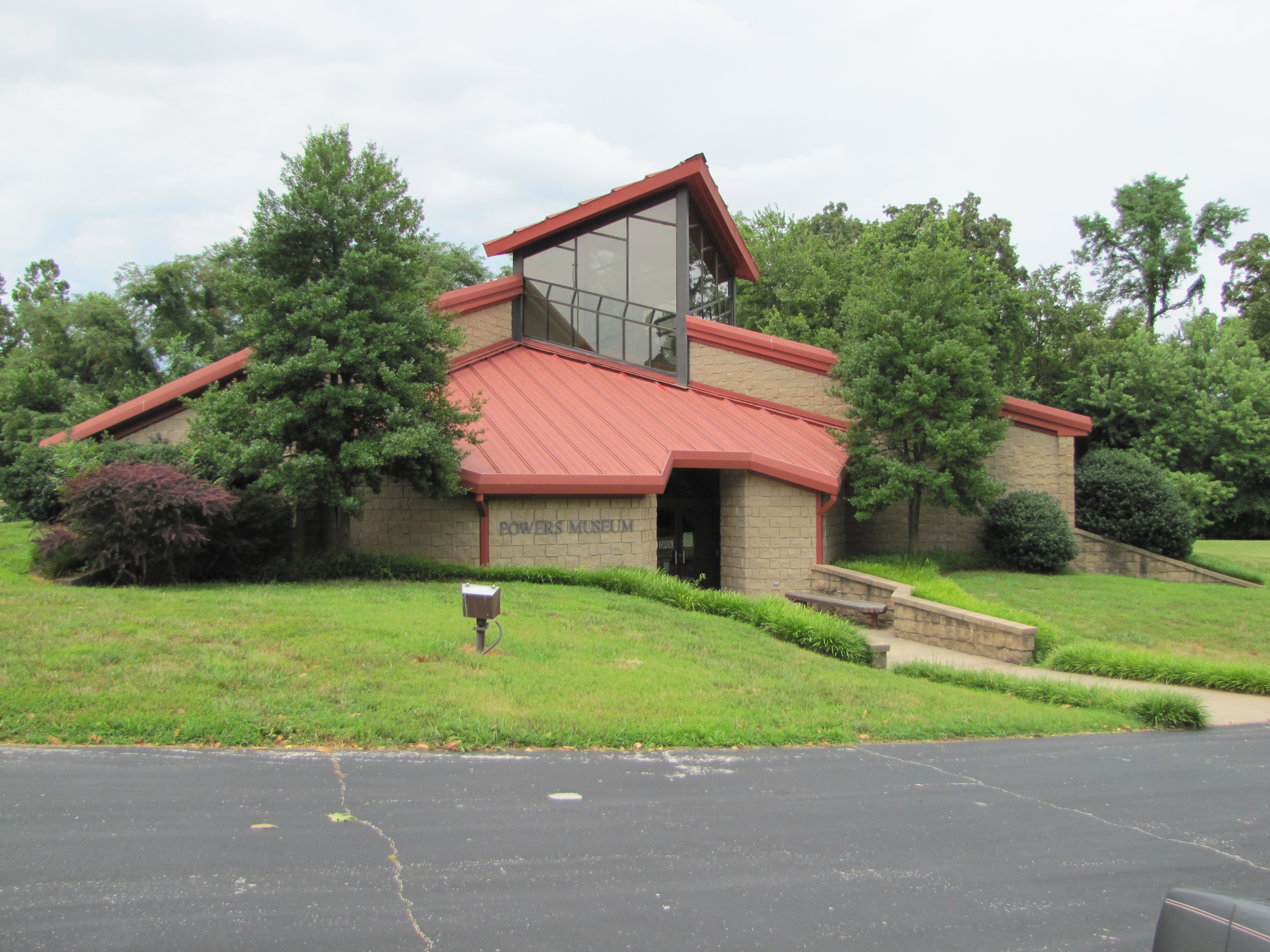
Entrance to the Powers Museum

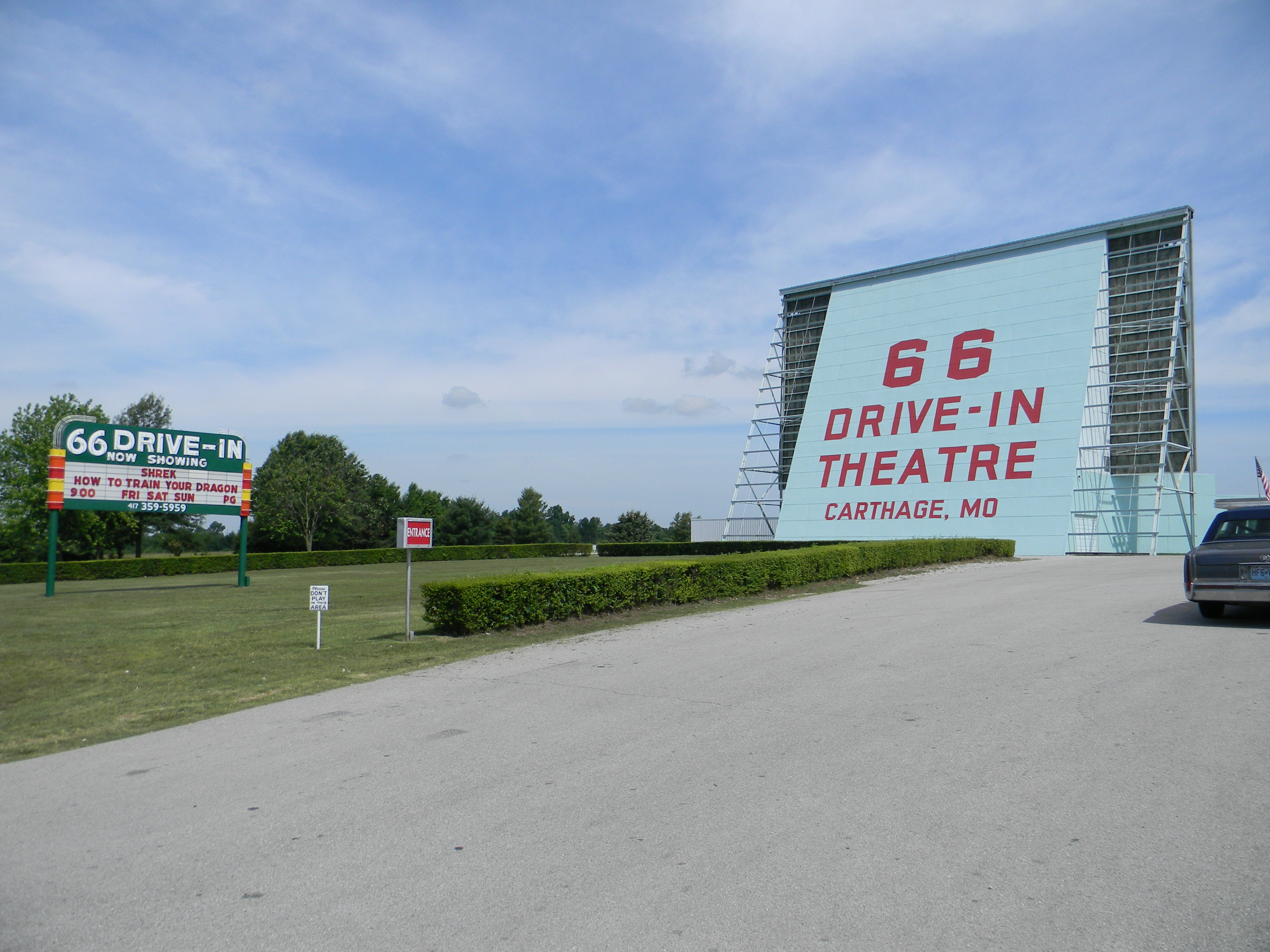
Carthage Route 66 Drive-In

Jasper County was formed in 1841. Carthage was chosen as the county seat, the area cleared and the town platted in 1842. The city was named after the ancient city-state of Carthage, one of the Roman Republic's main rivals (in what is now Tunisia). By the time of the American Civil War, there were over 500 residents, a brick and stone courthouse, and several businesses.

The area was divided over slavery, and almost all of the African-Americans in the county at the time were slaves. The Battle of Carthage, fought on July 5, 1861, was a clash between Union troops from St. Louis and Confederate troops led by the pro-Southern Missouri Governor Claiborne Fox Jackson. The "Second Battle of Carthage" occurred in October 1863 when Union troops confronted Confederate troops north of town and forced them to return to Arkansas. The town experienced minor skirmishes and attacks throughout the war; pro-Confederate guerrillas burned most of the city (including the courthouse) in September 1864. Historical accounts, such as Jasper County, Missouri in the Civil War (1923) by Col. Ward L. Schrantz, document the regional warfare.

The area grew rapidly following the Civil War. The Missouri and Western Railway arrived in 1872. Town residents started a foundry, furniture factory, woolen and grain mills, a plow works and numerous liveries and other businesses. Leggett & Platt, now a Fortune 500 company still based in Carthage, was founded in 1883. Nearby lead mines and limestone quarries also contributed significant wealth and Carthage became one of the most prosperous towns in the area. Residents poured their money into ornate Victorian-style homes, many of which are now part of the Carthage South District, which was named to the National Register of Historic Places in 1982. The Jasper County Courthouse, also on the National Register of Historic Places, was built of Carthage stone in 1894–95. There is a mural inside the courthouse depicting the history of Jasper County. Growth in Carthage can be documented through Sanborn maps, many of which are available online.

Numerous local buildings, in addition to the courthouse, were built in the late 19th and early 20th century out of stone from local quarries. The limestone is hard enough to be polished into "Carthage marble" and was used in both the interior and exterior of the state capitol building in Jefferson City, Missouri. The quarries known today as the Carthage Underground, a commercial space that utilizes but a small portion of the extensive uncharted quarries nearby.

In 1925, Ozark Wesleyan College merged three Methodist colleges into one institution and built a campus in the center of town. The college operated only a few years before closing. The campus was home to Our Lady of the Ozarks College from 1944 to 1971 and now houses the Vietnamese-American Catholic religious Congregation of the Mother Co-Redemptrix. This Vietnamese order of priests and brothers came from Vietnam and settled in Carthage in 1975, immediately following the Vietnam War. In the monastery of this Vietnamese congregation, Archbishop Pierre Martin Ngô Đình Thục died in 1984.

U.S. Highways 66 and 71 came through town in the 1920s, and for a time the town saw a stream of cross-country traffic. Route 66 intersected with U.S. Route 71 at the present intersection of Central and Garrison Avenue. The original owners of a Boots Court motel at this crossroads promoted a drive-in restaurant with a KDMO AM radio broadcast, "Breakfast at the Crossroads of America", named as a reference to the two major highways of the era. Route 66 was eventually re-routed, then replaced in the 1960s with Interstate 44 running south of town.

In the late 20th century, the town began actively courting tourism, emphasizing its history (the Battle of Carthage, Victorian architecture, and Route 66), as well as its proximity to the Precious Moments hotel and store, along with the popular country music destination Branson.

== Geography ==
Carthage is located south of the Spring River along I-49/US Route 71. Joplin is approximately twelve miles to the southwest and Neosho is about 17 miles to the south.

According to the United States Census Bureau, the city has a total area of 11.69 square miles (30.28 km^{2}), of which 11.65 square miles (30.17 km^{2}) is land and 0.04 square miles (0.10 km^{2}) is water.

== Demographics ==
Historical population
Census	Pop.	Note	%±
1880	4,167		—
1890	7,981		91.5%
1900	9,416		18.0%
1910	9,483		0.7%
1920	10,068		6.2%
1930	9,736		−3.3%
1940	10,585		8.7%
1950	11,188		5.7%
1960	11,264		0.7%
1970	11,035		−2.0%
1980	11,104		0.6%
1990	10,747		−3.2%
2000	12,668		17.9%
2010	14,502		14.5%
2020	15,522		7.0%
2025 (est.)	15,895		2.4%
U.S. Decennial Census

Carthage is part of the Joplin, Missouri Metropolitan Area.

=== 2020 census ===
As of the 2020 census, Carthage had a population of 15,522. The median age was 33.4 years. 29.3% of residents were under the age of 18 and 15.3% were 65 years of age or older. For every 100 females, there were 93.1 males, and for every 100 females age 18 and over, there were 90.0 males.

98.2% of residents lived in urban areas, while 1.8% lived in rural areas.

There were 5,568 households in Carthage, and the census also counted 3,458 families. Of those households, 36.5% had children under the age of 18 living in them. Of all households, 42.0% were married-couple households, 18.2% were households with a male householder and no spouse or partner present, and 31.6% were households with a female householder and no spouse or partner present. About 29.8% of all households were made up of individuals, and 14.3% had someone living alone who was 65 years of age or older.

There were 6,094 housing units, of which 8.6% were vacant. The homeowner vacancy rate was 1.5% and the rental vacancy rate was 7.2%.

Racial composition as of the 2020 census
Race	Number	Percent
White	9,753	62.8%
Black or African American	210	1.4%
American Indian and Alaska Native	285	1.8%
Asian	191	1.2%
Native Hawaiian and Other Pacific Islander	79	0.5%
Some other race	3,747	24.1%
Two or more races	1,257	8.1%
Hispanic or Latino (of any race)	5,058	32.6%

=== Income and poverty ===
The 2016–2020 5-year American Community Survey estimates show that the median household income was $39,938 (with a margin of error of +/- $3,637) and the median family income was $42,784 (+/- $5,358). Males had a median income of $27,714 (+/- $5,657) versus $24,612 (+/- $3,574) for females. The median income for those above 16 years old was $26,340 (+/- $1,862). Approximately, 27.7% of families and 33.8% of the population were below the poverty line, including 52.7% of those under the age of 18 and 10.6% of those ages 65 or over.

=== 2010 census ===
As of the census of 2010, there were 14,378 people, 5,169 households, and 3,419 families living in the city. The population density was 1,234.2 inhabitants per square mile (476.5/km^{2}). There were 5,753 housing units at an average density of 493.8 per square mile (190.7/km^{2}). The racial makeup of the city was 73.6% White, 1.5% African American, 1.0% Native American, 1.0% Asian, 0.6% Pacific Islander, 18.9% from other races, and 3.4% from two or more races. Hispanic or Latino of any race were 25.6% of the population.

There were 5,169 households, of which 38.9% had children under the age of 18 living with them, 45.2% were married couples living together, 14.6% had a female householder with no husband present, 6.3% had a male householder with no wife present, and 33.9% were non-families. 29.2% of all households were made up of individuals, and 13.6% had someone living alone who was 65 years of age or older. The average household size was 2.69 and the average family size was 3.26.

The median age in the city was 32 years. 28.8% of residents were under the age of 18; 10.6% were between the ages of 18 and 24; 25.9% were from 25 to 44; 20.7% were from 45 to 64; and 13.9% were 65 years of age or older. The gender makeup of the city was 48.9% male and 51.1% female.

=== 2000 census ===
At the 2000 census, there were 12,668 people, 4,813 households and 3,157 families living in the city. The population density was 1,328.2 inhabitants per square mile (512.8/km^{2}). There were 5,217 housing units at an average density of 547.0 per square mile (211.2/km^{2}). The racial makeup of the city was 81.46% White, 2.39% African American, 1.05% Native American, 1.59% Asian, 0.21% Pacific Islander, 6.65% from other races, and 4.94% from two or more races. Hispanic or Latino of any race were 18.27% of the population.

There were 4,813 households, of which 30.9% had children under the age of 18 living with them, 49.5% were married couples living together, 11.9% had a female householder with no husband present, and 34.4% were non-families. 30.0% of all households were made up of individuals, and 16.4% had someone living alone who was 65 years of age or older. The average household size was 2.49 and the average family size was 3.04.

25.4% of the population were under the age of 18, 10.9% from 18 to 24, 27.4% from 25 to 44, 18.6% from 45 to 64, and 17.6% who were 65 years of age or older. The median age was 35 years. For every 100 females, there were 95.2 males. For every 100 females age 18 and over, there were 89.7 males.

The median household income was $32,557 and the median family income was $37,927. Males had a median income of $29,315 compared with $21,442 for females. The per capita income for the city was $15,281. About 12.7% of families and 19.2% of the population were below the poverty line, including 23.5% of those under age 18 and 13.0% of those age 65 or over.

== Economy ==
Major area employers include Leggett & Platt, a former Fortune 500 corporation manufacturing household durables, which is headquartered in the town, H.E. Williams, Inc. (a manufacturer of commercial and industrial lighting fixtures), Otts Foods, Schreiber Foods, and Goodman Manufacturing (all producing various food products) and the Carthage Underground, formerly a quarry, which now serves as a storage area with climate control for various products. Carthage was well known in the early 20th century for the fine-grained, extremely dense grey limestone, "Carthage Marble", which came from that mine and was used for numerous public buildings throughout the US, including the Capitol Building in Jefferson City and the Jasper County Courthouse.

Carthage has several food manufacturers and processing plants in and around the city. These plants produce a great deal of slaughterhouse waste. Changing World Technologies and its subsidiary Renewable Environment Solutions built the first operational commercial thermal conversion plant in the United States to take advantage of the large amount of feedstock for the thermal conversion process made available by the many food rendering plants in the area in 2003.

In January 2008, a new city-owned hospital, McCune-Brooks, opened and the old facility has been renovated for use by the Carthage Water and Electric Plant. The new Carthage High School opened in 2009.

The Dyno Nobel plant in Carthage is the only facility manufacturing dynamite in North America.

== Education and extracurricular activities ==
Carthage is in the Carthage R-IX School District. It operates five elementary schools (Pleasant Valley, Steadley, Fairview, Mark Twain, and Columbian), an intermediate center, a 6th Grade Center, Carthage Jr. High School, and Carthage Senior High School. It also operates a Technical Center that offers courses to both current high schoolers and community members. This primarily includes an in depth practical nursing program, construction and carpentry classes, and forklift certifications. The school district has 5,062 students as of the 2023–2024 school year.

The town has a lending library, the Carthage Public Library. It opened in 1905 after receiving a grant of $25,000 from Andrew Carnegie and passing a tax vote to support the library 831 to 94 and was built using Carthage Marble. The library was renovated and expanded upon in starting in 2006 and ending in 2008. In late 2020, an annex named the Steadley Family Legacy Center opened that functioned as a maker space for the community providing 3D printers and other hands on tools for creating.

== Arts and culture ==
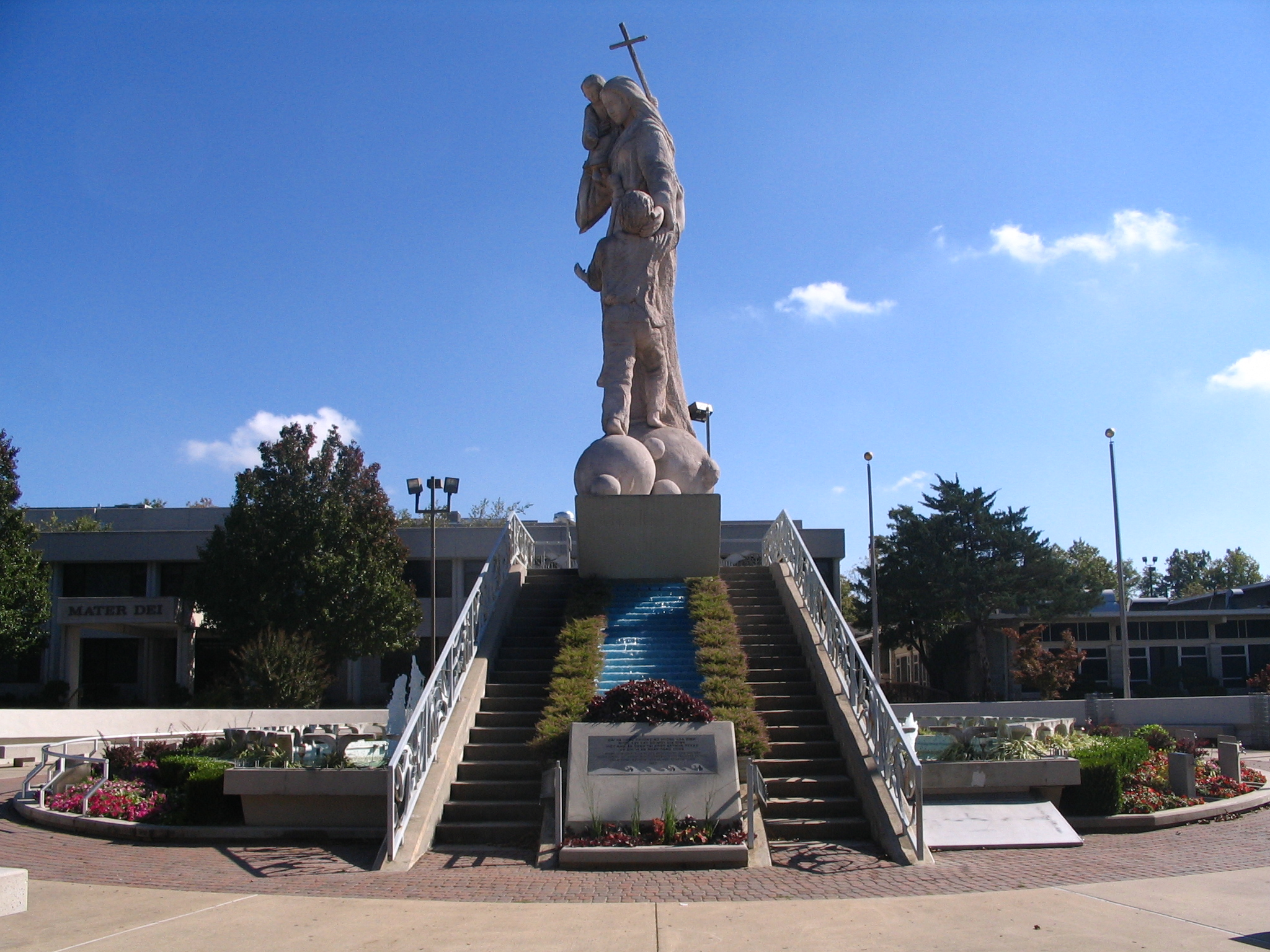
Statue and fountain at Vietnamese CMC monastery

Carthage was the site of the Battle of Carthage, the first official engagement of the American Civil War, on July 5, 1861. Local groups stage reenactments of the battle, near the grounds of the State Historic Site which commemorates the event.

Carthage is located on Historic U.S. Route 66. The original alignment around town is still marked, and several old businesses built to cater to travelers can still be seen.

Since 1966, Carthage has held a festival each October called the Maple Leaf Festival. The week-long festival is named for the many maple trees that grow in the town, whose leaves change into bright colors such as red, orange, and yellow in the fall.

Since 1978, Carthage has hosted the annual Marian Days celebration for Vietnamese American Catholics. The event, which typically draws 50,000 to 70,000 attendees, takes place on the 28-acre (110,000 m^{2}) campus of the Congregation of the Mother Co-Redemptrix.

Carthage is also the home of the Precious Moments Park and Chapel, a tourist attraction with paintings and oversized depictions of the popular porcelain figurines.

Histories of Carthage include Ward L. Schrantz's Jasper County Missouri in the Civil War (Carthage, Missouri: The Carthage, Missouri Kiwanis Club, 1923), History of Jasper County, Missouri (Des Moines, Iowa: Mills & Company, 1883) and Images of America: Carthage, Missouri (Chicago, Illinois: Arcadia Publishing, 2000).

Victorian era homes of Carthage are featured in It Wasn't A Dream, It Was A Flood, a 1974 autobiographical, 16mm short film about poet Frank Stanford.

Composer James Scott, regarded as one of the three most important composers of classic ragtime, lived in Carthage from 1901 to 1906. Scott attended Lincoln High School and worked in the music store of Charles L. Dumars. Demand for the music of Scott, who began to compose while living in Carthage, convinced Dumars to publish Scott's "A Summer Breeze" in 1903.

== Government ==
The government of Carthage is represented by a Mayor-council government. Carthage is divided into five wards, each represented by two members. Ward 1 is currently represented by Derek Peterson and Kate Gilpin. Ward 2 is represented by Ray West, and Ward 3 is represented by Jack Perkins and David Thorn. Ward 4 is currently represented by Beth Kang and Alan Snow, and Ward 5 is currently represented by Jana Schramm and Ron Wells.

Carthage is in Missouri's 7th congressional district and has been represented in the United States Congress by Eric Burlison since 2023.

In the Missouri House of Representatives, Carthage is in the 163rd District and has been represented by Cathy Loy since 2024. In the Missouri Senate, Jill Carter has represented the Joplin-Carthage area in the Missouri State Senate District 32 since 2023.

The Carthage Police Department is the law enforcement agency in the city of Carthage. Currently the police chief of Carthage is Bill Hawkins.

== Notable people ==
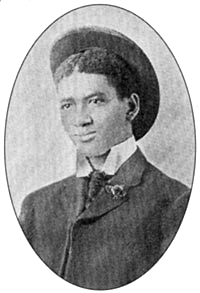
James Scott

- Gideon Winans Allen (1835–1912), member of the Wisconsin State Assembly
- Raymond P. Ayres (b. 1944), American military officer who held the rank of Lieutenant general in the United States Marine Corps
- Annie White Baxter (1894–1944), first female elected official in Missouri, first woman elected county clerk in the United States
- Marcus B. Bell (1893–1981), U.S. Army brigadier general
- Emily Newell Blair (1877–1951), American writer, suffragist, national Democratic Party political leader, a founder of the League of Women Voters, and feminist
- Jann Carl (b. 1960), television personality, Entertainment Tonight
- Tiffany Cossey (c. 1973), Former City Council member (Ward 5), Carthage, Missouri, Known for: first time an elected official in Jasper County history had been successfully recalled
- Frances Crowe (1919–2019), peace activist
- Tom Flanigan (b. 1953), former member of the Missouri House of Representatives
- Carl Hubbell (1903–1988), Baseball Hall of Fame pitcher for the New York Giants
- Janet L. Kavandi (b. 1959), astronaut (STS-91, STS-99, STS-104)
- Celia Kaye (b. 1942), actress
- Preston Lacy (b. 1969), stunt performer, actor, comedian and one of the stars of the reality stunt show Jackass
- David Newell (1905–1980), was primarily known as an American character actor
- Marlin Perkins (1905–1986), zoologist, naturalist and host of Mutual of Omaha's Wild Kingdom
- Haven Shepherd (b. 2003), Paralympic swimmer
- Belle Starr (Myra MayBelle Shirley) (1848–1889), famous Wild West outlaw
- Bertha Teague (1906–1991), basketball coach, member of Basketball Hall of Fame
- Richard M. Webster (1922–1990), former Speaker of the Missouri House of Representatives and member of the Missouri Senate
- William L. Webster (b. 1953), former Missouri Attorney General
- Charles Wright (b. 1964), former football player
- Felix Wright (b. 1959), NFL football player
