= Honey Creek (Spring River tributary) =

Location
- Country: United States
- State: Missouri
- Region: Lawrence County

Physical characteristics
- Source
  - coordinates: 36°58′24″N 93°39′11″W
- Mouth
  - coordinates: 37°04′45″N 93°51′42″W
  - elevation: 1,122 ft (342 m)

Honey Creek is a stream in Lawrence County in the U.S. state of Missouri. It is a tributary of the Spring River. The stream headwaters are located south of Marionville and the stream flows north passing under U.S. Route 60 and past the west side of Marionville. The stream turns northwest then west and flows past the communities of Orange and Elliott. The stream passes under Missouri Route 39 and turns to the northwest passing the community of Hoberg to its confluence with the Spring River just south of Interstate 44 and southwest of Mount Vernon.

Honey Creek was named for the honeybees in the area.

== See also ==
- List of rivers of Missouri
