= White Oak Creek (Spring River tributary) =

Stream in the U.S. state of Missouri

White Oak Creek is a stream in Lawrence and Jasper counties of southwest Missouri. It is a tributary of the Spring River.

The headwaters of the stream are at 37°13′27″N 93°53′32″W and the confluence with the Spring River is at 37°09′46″N 94°09′59″W. The intermittent streams at the source area in northwest Lawrence County just northwest of Miller flow northwest past Round Grove on Missouri Route UU. The stream turns west and then southwest passing under Missouri Route 97 and north of Grays Point and Red Oak. The stream flows into Jasper County north of Plew and flows under Missouri Route 96 east of Avilla and flows under Missouri Route 37 before joining the Spring River east of Carthage.

White Oak Creek was named for the white oak trees lining its course.

== See also ==
- List of rivers of Missouri
