= Johnson Creek (Turnback Creek tributary) =

Stream in Missouri, United States

Johnson Creek is a stream in northeast Lawrence County of southwest Missouri. It is a tributary of Turnback Creek.

The stream headwaters are located at 37°10′11″N 93°44′37″W and the confluence with Turnback Creek is at 37°11′34″N 93°41′18″W. The stream source lies northwest of Chesapeake and the stream flows northeast turning north as it flows under Interstate 44 and then northwest to its confluence with Turnback Creek just south of Missouri Route 96 between the communities of Paris Springs and Spencer.

Johnson Creek has the name of the local Johnson family.

== See also ==
- List of rivers of Missouri
