= H. Dale Jackson =

Rev. H. Dale Jackson, STD, LHD
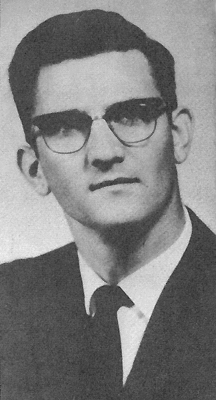
- H. Dale Jackson, 1957
- Born: Herman Dale Jackson; December 7, 1930 rural Lawrence County, Missouri, U.S.
- Died: February 15, 2003 (aged 72); Sycamore Hills, Missouri, U.S.
- Education: Southwest Baptist University; Ouachita Baptist University; Southwestern Baptist Theological Seminary
- Years active: 1951–2002
- Title: Pastor (1952–1967); Senior Pastor (1967–1987)
- Spouse(s): Frances Reinsmith; 1949–2003 (his death)

Reverend Dr. H. Dale Jackson (December 7, 1930 – February 15, 2003) was a Baptist minister, denominational leader and ethicist. He is most remembered for his efforts in promoting the historic distinctives of the Baptist faith; among those being the ideals of absolute separation of church and state, the authority of the Holy Scriptures, the autonomy of the local church, the priesthood of the individual, perseverance of the saints and the ordinances of believer's baptism by immersion and Holy Communion. For twenty years, he served as senior pastor of the Overland Baptist Church in St. Louis, Missouri.

== Early life and education ==
Herman Dale Jackson was the third son of Herman William and Annie Rachel Dunton Jackson, born December 7, 1930, near Chesapeake, in rural southwestern Missouri. Jackson's ancestry included English, Scotch-Irish, French Acadian (Louisiana 'Cajun') and Missouri Sioux. His forebears came to what is now Missouri in 1796, when the land was still under the rule of Spain. The religious preferences of his immediate ancestry were Baptist, Methodist and Disciples of Christ. His great-great-grandfather, the Rev. Jason E. Dunton, was a Methodist minister who had been excommunicated for practicing spiritualism and lecturing on socialism in the late 19th century.

Jackson's parents were tenant farmers during the Great Depression and the Dust Bowl. His father, who led congregational singing in the church, had been raised in the rural Southern Missionary Baptist tradition; his mother, a Sunday School teacher, had converted to that faith in childhood. Jackson was baptised into the First Baptist Church of Stotts City, Missouri, at the age of nine.

Jackson's lifelong appreciation for the outdoors stemmed from his experiences growing up in the rural Ozarks. He attended Stotts City School and Mt. Vernon High School and married Frances Reinsmith. They had four children.

Jackson had planned to become a cattle rancher, but made a decision to enter the ministry at the age of twenty. He was ordained at the First Baptist Church of Joplin, Missouri, in November 1951. He received degrees from Southwest Baptist University and Ouachita Baptist University, and did graduate studies at Southwestern Baptist Theological Seminary. He was a member of Alpha Kappa, an academic sociological fraternity. He received a Doctor of Sacred Theology degree from Southwest Baptist University, a Doctor of Humane Letters degree from Missouri Baptist University and was honored by William Jewell College with a Walter Pope Binns fellowship and election to the Charles Haddon Spurgeon Society.

During his childhood, he was called "Dale" in order to distinguish him from his father, Herman. While in college, he was designated "H. Dale" to differentiate him from another student named Dale Jackson. The name stayed with him for the rest of his life.

In his later years, he spent time in Great Britain on a study fellowship with Missouri Baptist University, visiting the sites of early Baptist martyrdom and gathering data on the history of the English Baptists.

== Pastoral career and beyond ==
Jackson pastored churches in rural southwestern Missouri and southern Arkansas while in college. After college, and while continuing his seminary education, he served as pastor of the First Baptist Church of Des Arc, Arkansas, 1956–1957 and the Eagle Heights Baptist Church in Harrison, Arkansas, 1957–1967. During the early part of the Cold War era of the mid 1950s through the early 1960s, Jackson was in demand as an after-dinner speaker. One of his topics was the threat of Soviet Communism.

=== Overland Baptist Church ===
According to family recollection, Jackson was being groomed by Dr. Paul Roberts, senior pastor of the First Baptist Church of Little Rock, Arkansas, to take leadership of that congregation following Roberts's eventual retirement. In March 1967, Jackson informed the South Highland Baptist Church in Little Rock of his intention to accept the position of senior pastor there.

Having been contacted previously by the search committee at the Overland Baptist Church in St. Louis, Missouri, Jackson called the Overland church to inform them of his decision. The committee chairman responded by telling Jackson that he was the only candidate whom they were considering, and if he took the position in Little Rock, the Overland church would wait until he made himself available to them again. Jackson reconsidered, and in May 1967, he accepted the position of senior pastor of the Overland church, following the twenty-year ministry of Dr. David W. Jones. Health problems forced Jackson into an early retirement in May 1987.

=== Denominational and ecumenical leadership ===
In denominational work, Jackson served as moderator of the Northwest Arkansas Baptist Pastor's Conference, on various committees of the Southern Baptist Convention, first vice-president and member of the executive board, Missouri Baptist Convention, president of the board of trustees of Missouri Baptist University, co-founder of the Metro St. Louis Police Chaplain's Association, chaplain of the Overland, Missouri Police Department, Sheriff's Deputy and Chaplain, Boone County, Arkansas, and co-founder, Operation Food Search.

In the early 1980s, observing the Southern Baptist Convention's shift from a moderate and tolerant theological position to a rigid fundamentalism, he was a founding member of the SBC Forum. In 1986, in further response, he organized a group of St. Louis-area pastors that later became the Cooperative Baptist Fellowship of Missouri.

Due to Jackson's widespread ecumenical work, the interdenominational Ritenour Ministerial Alliance of the communities of northwest St. Louis County named him lifetime "Bishop of Overland" at his retirement. He received citations from Americans United for Separation of Church and State, the American Legion, the Christian Life Commission of the Missouri Baptist Convention and other organizations for his statewide leadership in moral and ethical issues, Christian citizenship, and separation of church and state. His printed and taped sermons and Bible studies have been circulated worldwide.

In 1989, the Overland Baptist Church bestowed upon him the title, Pastor Emeritus. The church's sanctuary building and a ministerial scholarship at William Jewell College are named in honor of Dr. and Mrs. Jackson.

== Beliefs and philosophy ==
Jackson was a scholar of the ancient Greek language and Roman Period Palestinian culture. Having exhaustively studied the New Testament in this context, he emphatically believed that the Holy Bible was not intended to be casually read or taken as literally inerrant, but rather to be considered and studied for its broader message. His beliefs regarding separation of church and government, social responsibility, the equality of men and women in the church and a woman's right to choose an abortion put him at odds with fundamentalist Southern Baptist leadership, and he was sometimes ridiculed by colleagues.

He did not preach on morals or lecture about the faults of people; rather, his sermons and writings focused on the forgiveness of God through Jesus Christ, and he encouraged listeners to 'forgive themselves', since God had forgiven them. During an era when many evangelical theologians considered the message of the Gospel to be exclusive, he preached a Gospel of inclusion for all people. In his last years, he devoted his time to study and contemplation of Scripture and became increasingly universalist in his theology, in a similar fashion as fellow Baptist, Rev. Dr. Billy Graham

Jackson understood the Biblical role of Pastor to be one of leadership, instruction and authority. Rather than unleash ideas that might be perceived by some as radical or unconventional, he chose to make changes gradually, through teaching, hermeneutics, exegetical preaching and pastoral counseling.

== Personal life ==
Jackson was an imposing figure, over six feet tall, with a deep, resonant voice and deliberate speech. He considered the church, its mission, people, message and business operation to be his sacred trust; if necessary, he could be intimidating. He had a reputation of having no fear, even when facing armed criminals. He was known to exhibit the dark side of his Celtic origins; however, he had a ready sense of humor, often self-deprecating.

He gained considerable notoriety for the black suits and solid black ties he wore every day. Once, while waiting in the Nashville airport, a Baptist magazine editor mistook singer Johnny Cash for Jackson.

Jackson was an experienced boater and avid fisherman who relished angling for rainbow trout in the lakes of southern Missouri and northwestern Arkansas. He was also an expert marksman and enjoyed hunting for quail and small game. He especially liked to hunt or fish with family and friends, and prepare the game for dinner for a number of guests. During the early years of his residence in Harrison, Arkansas, he was a member of the Lions Club.

Jackson once recalled for his family an occasion of being a featured speaker at a statewide youth event in Little Rock, Arkansas, in the early 1960s, where he counseled a teenaged Bill Clinton. He remembered the profound impression made by the young man. He met and maintained friendships with people from all walks of life, whether they shared his religious beliefs or not.

== Death ==
Jackson was a heavy smoker and tobacco user during his early adulthood, although he was able to quit cigarettes "cold turkey". In 1965, he underwent surgery at Baptist Hospital in Little Rock, Arkansas, to remove a large tumor in his sinus cavity. It was during this hospitalization that he was diagnosed with rheumatoid arthritis, which moved out of remission about ten years later. The disease eventually became systemic and subsequently contributed to a heart condition and polyneuropathy. He spent his last fifteen years in and out of hospitals, finally receiving hospice care at his home in Sycamore Hills, Missouri. In February 2003, he became unresponsive. In accordance with his wishes, he was taken off all medications and died peacefully three days later, on February 15, 2003. Jackson was given police honors at his funeral at the Overland Baptist Church.
