= Bowers Mill, Missouri =

Unincorporated community in the US state of Missouri

Coordinates: 37°08′59″N 94°03′23″W

Bowers Mill is an unincorporated community in Jasper and Lawrence counties, in the U.S. state of Missouri. The community and mill are located on the Spring River midway between Mount Vernon to the east and Carthage to the west. La Russell lies just to the south.

== History ==
Bowers Mill was platted in 1869, taking its name from William Bowers, the proprietor of a local watermill. A post office called Bowers Mill was established in 1847, and remained in operation until 1934.
