= Missouri Route 266 =

State highway in Missouri, U.S.

Route 266
- Route 266 highlighted in red

Route information
- Maintained by MoDOT
- Length: 16.237 mi (26.131 km)

Major junctions
- West end: Route 96 west of Halltown
- East end: I-44 / I-44 BL at Springfield

Location
- Country: United States
- State: Missouri

Highway system
- Missouri State Highway System; Interstate; US; State; Supplemental
← Route 265	→ Route 267

Route 266 is a section of former U.S. Route 66 (US 66) with termini between Interstate 44 (I-44) at Springfield and Route 96 west of Halltown. The road runs as a two-lane highway its entire length of 16 miles (26 km) and is marked as Historic Route 66.

== Route description ==
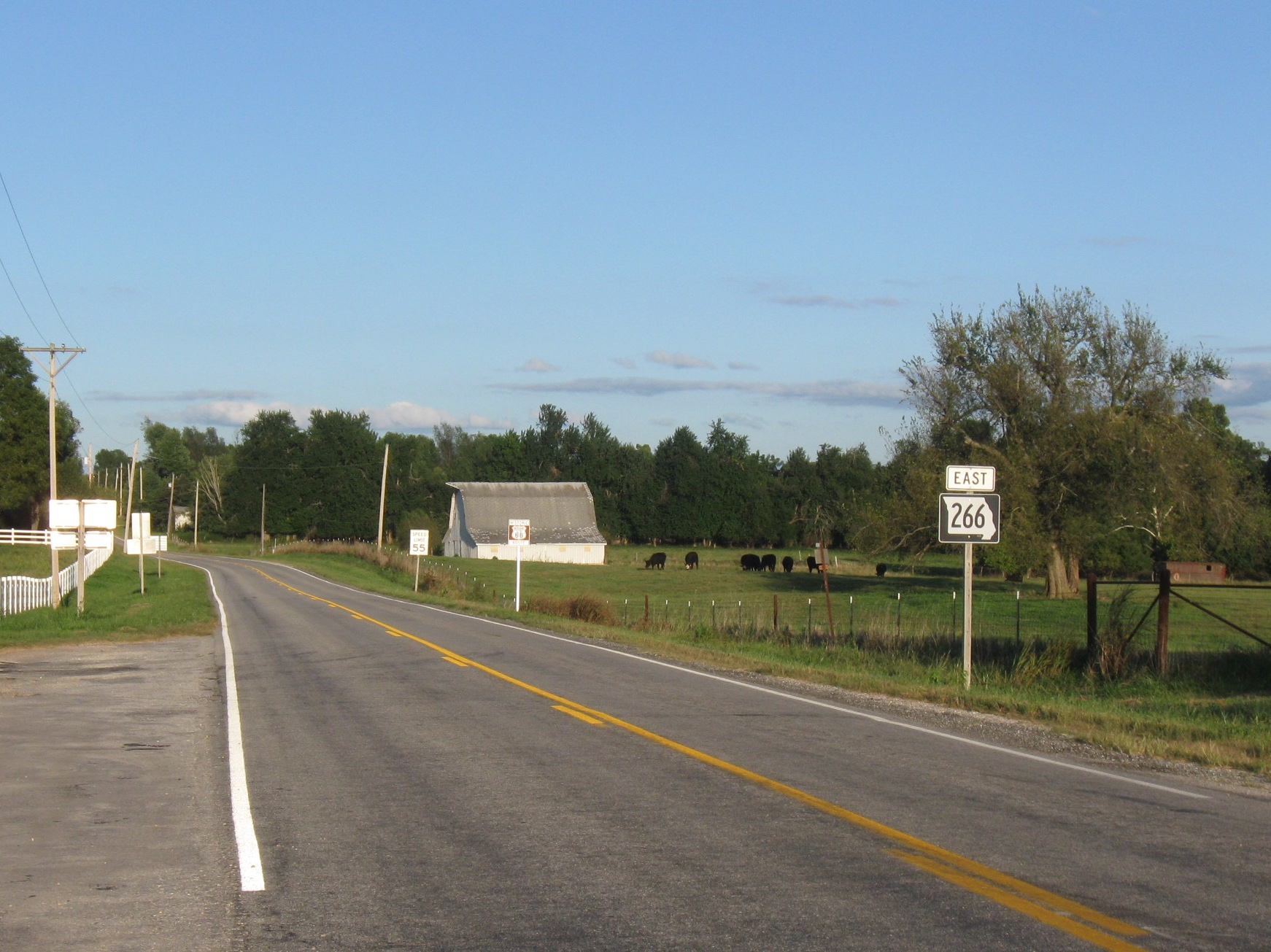
Route 266 in Halltown.

Route 266 starts at its intersection of Missouri Route 96 1.5 miles (2.4 km) west of I-44. At Halltown, the Route meets Route Z. In 12.5 miles (20.1 km), Route 266 deviates from old US 66 in a project to improve access to Springfield-Branson Regional Airport. For 1 mile (1.6 km), the route follows the new roadway. At the Partial cloverleaf interchange at Interstate 44, the road continues as Interstate 44 Business.

== History ==
Route 266 was originally assigned to a new expressway built through downtown Springfield (specifically, Chestnut Expressway between College Street and Glenstone Avenue). As Interstate 44 was constructed, and US 66 was assigned concurrently with it, the now former US 66 from Springfield to Route 96 was added to Route 266. The westernmost section (which passed through Paris Springs Junction and Spencer) would be turned into county roads. Eventually, Chestnut Expressway would be designated Interstate 44 Business, and Route 266 would have its current route.

== Major intersections ==
County	Location	mi	km	Destinations	Notes
Lawrence	Ozark Township	0.000	0.000	Route 96	
Lawrence	Halltown	2.554	4.110	Route Z	
Greene	Pond Creek Township	4.892	7.873	Route F	
Greene	Pond Creek Township	5.651	9.094	Route K	
Greene	Center Township	10.933	17.595	Route T	
Greene	Center Township	13.566	21.832	Route AB	
Greene	Center Township	14.068	22.640	Route B	
Greene	Springfield	16.156– 16.173	26.001– 26.028	I-44	exit 72 on I-44
Greene	Springfield	16.237	26.131	I-44 BL	
1.000 mi = 1.609 km; 1.000 km = 0.621 mi
