= Olinger =

Olinger may refer to:

== Places ==
- Olinger, Pennsylvania, a fictional town that appears in the works of author John Updike
- Olinger, Missouri
- Olinger, Virginia

== Surname ==
- Bob Olinger (1850–1881), American frontiersman
- Brian Olinger (born 1983), American runner
- Jean-Paul Olinger (born 1943), Luxembourgian fencer
- John Wallace Olinger (1849–1940), American frontiersman
- Jon Olinger (born 1980), American football player
- Marilyn Olinger (1928–2006), American baseball player
- Oliver Olinger (1893–1972), American politician from Nebraska
- Rolf Olinger (1924–2006), Swiss alpine skier

== See also ==
- Olinger Tower
