= La Russell, Missouri =

- City
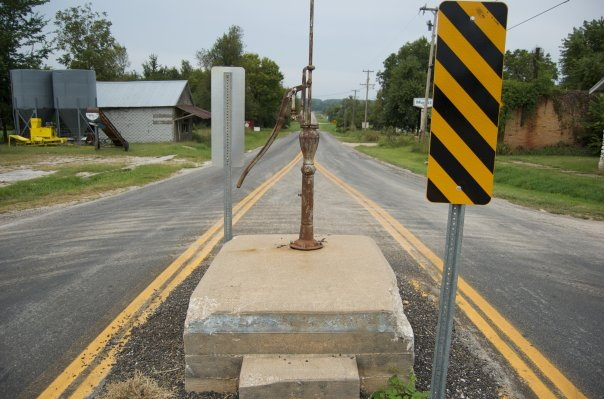
- Main Street, La Russell, Missouri, as seen from the La Russell Water Pump
- Motto: Viva La Russell
- Location of La Russell, Missouri
- Coordinates: 37°08′25″N 94°03′40″W
- Country: United States
- State: Missouri
- County: Jasper

Area
  - Total: 0.34 sq mi (0.87 km^{2})
  - Land: 0.34 sq mi (0.87 km^{2})
  - Water: 0 sq mi (0.00 km^{2})
- Elevation: 1,079 ft (329 m)

Population (2020)
  - Total: 134
  - Density: 399.5/sq mi (154.26/km^{2})
- Time zone: UTC-6 (Central (CST))
  - Summer (DST): UTC-5 (CDT)
- ZIP code: 64848
- Area code: 417
- FIPS code: 29-40790
- GNIS feature ID: 2395573

La Russell is a city in Jasper County, Missouri, United States. The population was 134 at the 2020 census. It is part of the Joplin, Missouri Metropolitan Statistical Area.

== Geography ==
La Russell is located in the valley of the Spring River, adjacent to the Jasper-Lawrence county line. Bowers Mill lies just to the northeast on the river. The Missouri-Pacific Railroad line lies along the river just to the north of the town.

According to the United States Census Bureau, the city has a total area of 0.34 square miles (0.88 km^{2}), all land.

== History ==
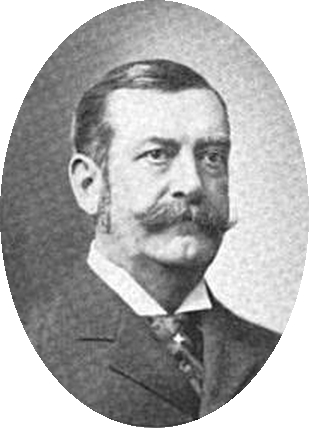
Russell Harding, 1900 CE. He succeeded W.B. Doddridge as General Manager of the Missouri Pacific Railway at the end of the 19th century. Russell Harding was born in Springfield, Massachusetts in 1856, and began his railroad career in 1870. La Russell, Missouri, was named in his honor in 1903.

The village of La Russell, Missouri was platted and laid out for public use August 18, 1903. La Russell was named in honor of Russell Harding, vice president and general manager of the Missouri-Pacific Railroad at that time and of importance to the town's creation. The French La was added to the original proposed name of Russell in order to prevent confusion with another Missouri town named Russellville. Because of this word change, the name La Russell appears to be unique in the United States.

This had been the hunting grounds of the Osage Indians who were known to have camped at nearby Spring River, a short distance north of present-day La Russell. Their lands to the east had been previously purchased by the U.S. Government in 1808 (Treaty of Fort Clark) and other tribes had been moved to this location as well, and then later all were moved again to the Osage Nation areas elsewhere. Arrowheads and other Native American artifacts can still be found in the plowed fields near the river today.

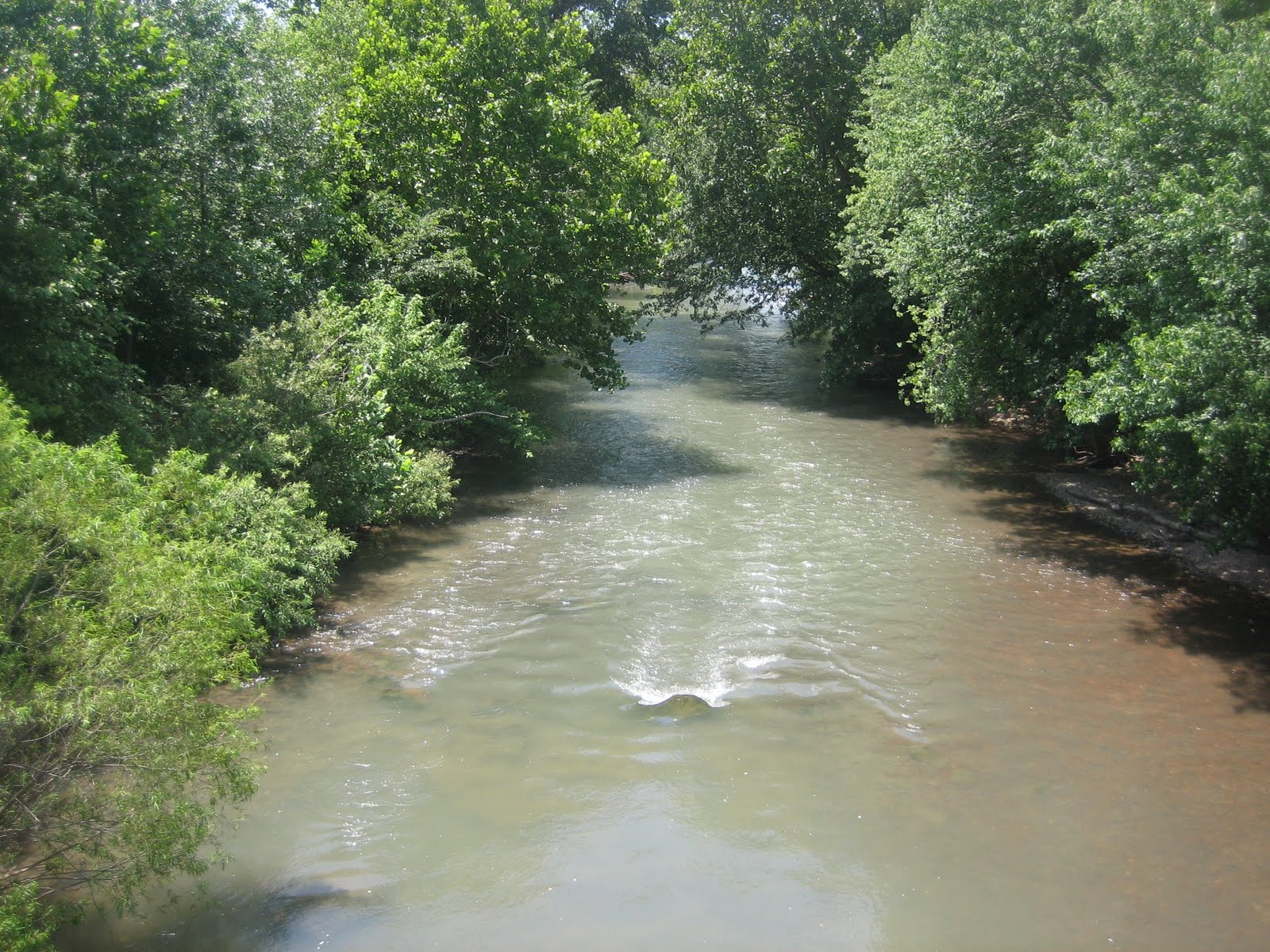
Spring River from State Highway U in La Russell

Although La Russell itself was founded in 1903 because of the railroad, early settlers at this location were among the first in the county dating back to the 1830s. The first public school in Jasper County was established near the future site of La Russell in 1838. This was the Cave Springs School, also known as Teas School in honor of its first teacher, Samuel Teas. School sessions during the Antebellum Era were split into two periods each school year, with a summer session and a winter session because students were needed at home for spring planting and fall harvest. The Cave Springs School also served as a church and a military headquarters for the Enrolled Missouri Militia (Union) during the Civil War. Following the burning and destruction of the county seat of Carthage in the Civil War, the state governor moved the temporary Jasper County Courthouse to the Cave Springs School in 1865. The school still exists and can be visited today. A Civil War memorial was also erected by the Eastern Jasper County Historic Sites Association in 2009 at the old Cave Springs Cemetery near La Russell, one of the oldest cemeteries in Jasper County.

The city of La Russell expanded as a railroad stop for the Missouri-Pacific Railroad in 1905, at the coming of the White River line. As of 2014, La Russell is a small rural and predominantly agricultural and livestock raising community.

The La Russell Water Pump decorated at Christmas time, La Russell, Missouri.

The La Russell Water Pump (circa 1904), conspicuously located in the middle of the road on Main Street, is a local cultural icon which dates back to the early beginnings of the town. An even earlier community water well is documented to have existed about two blocks south from the present one (before La Russell was founded), also located in the center of the road until it was replaced at the beginning of the 20th century. The La Russell Water Pump supplied water for the village inhabitants, who carried it to their homes in buckets for use, and was also a welcome sight for thirsty travelers and their horses, and in later years for filling automobile radiators in addition to a cold drink. The concrete base for the present pump was constructed by the town August 5, 1907 and shows damage from vehicle collisions that occurred over the past century because of its odd location in the center of the street. Due to increased accidents it has also been at the center of controversy in modern times as being a safety hazard, though many townspeople have fought against its removal because it is considered an historical landmark in La Russell. The debate continues to the present time, and this old beloved hand pump is traditionally decorated by locals during the Christmas holidays each year. The motto Viva La Russell has become a rallying cry for the protection of the pump and emblematic of the town itself.

== Demographics ==
Historical population
| Census | Pop. | Note | %± |
|---|---|---|---|
| 1910 | 261 | | — |
| 1920 | 173 | | −33.7% |
| 1930 | 163 | | −5.8% |
| 1940 | 161 | | −1.2% |
| 1950 | 82 | | −49.1% |
| 1960 | 129 | | 57.3% |
| 1970 | 97 | | −24.8% |
| 1980 | 126 | | 29.9% |
| 1990 | 114 | | −9.5% |
| 2000 | 138 | | 21.1% |
| 2010 | 114 | | −17.4% |
| 2020 | 134 | | 17.5% |
U.S. Decennial Census

=== 2010 census ===
As of the census of 2010, there were 114 people, 42 households, and 33 families residing in the city. The population density was 335.3 inhabitants per square mile (129.5/km^{2}). There were 55 housing units at an average density of 161.8 per square mile (62.5/km^{2}). The racial makeup of the city was 95.6% White, 2.6% Native American, and 1.8% from two or more races.

There were 42 households, of which 40.5% had children under the age of 18 living with them, 66.7% were married couples living together, 11.9% had a male householder with no wife present, and 21.4% were non-families. 21.4% of all households were made up of individuals, and 9.6% had someone living alone who was 65 years of age or older. The average household size was 2.71 and the average family size was 3.06.

The median age in the city was 43 years. 27.2% of residents were under the age of 18; 2.6% were between the ages of 18 and 24; 20.2% were from 25 to 44; 31.6% were from 45 to 64; and 18.4% were 65 years of age or older. The gender makeup of the city was 53.5% male and 46.5% female.

=== 2000 census ===
As of the census of 2000, there were 138 people, 51 households, and 39 families residing in the city. The population density was 405.2 inhabitants per square mile (156.4/km^{2}). There were 55 housing units at an average density of 161.5 per square mile (62.4/km^{2}). The racial makeup of the city was 94.93% White, 2.17% Native American, 0.72% Pacific Islander, and 2.17% from two or more races. Hispanic or Latino of any race were 1.45% of the population.

There were 51 households, out of which 33.3% had children under the age of 18 living with them, 60.8% were married couples living together, 11.8% had a female householder with no husband present, and 23.5% were non-families. 19.6% of all households were made up of individuals, and 11.8% had someone living alone who was 65 years of age or older. The average household size was 2.71 and the average family size was 3.03.

In the city the population was spread out, with 27.5% under the age of 18, 10.9% from 18 to 24, 29.0% from 25 to 44, 18.8% from 45 to 64, and 13.8% who were 65 years of age or older. The median age was 31 years. For every 100 females, there were 112.3 males. For every 100 females age 18 and over, there were 108.3 males.

The median income for a household in the city was $28,000, and the median income for a family was $21,750. Males had a median income of $28,750 versus $12,000 for females. The per capita income for the city was $10,451. There were 27.0% of families and 26.6% of the population living below the poverty line, including 22.0% of under eighteens and 20.0% of those over 64.
