= Heatonville, Missouri =

Unincorporated community in Missouri, U.S.

Coordinates: 37°11′18″N 93°47′58″W

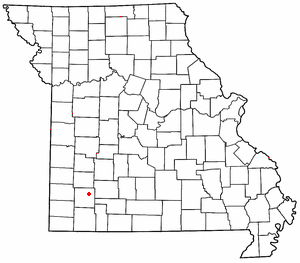

Heatonville is a small unincorporated community in Lawrence County, Missouri, United States. It lies along former U.S. Route 66 (Route 96), approximately six miles (10 km) north-east of Mount Vernon.

A post office called Heaton was established in 1872, the name was changed to Heatonville in 1888, and the post office closed in 1891. The community was named after Daniel Heaton, the original owner of the town site.
