= Lawrence County Courthouse (Missouri) =

- U.S. National Register of Historic Places
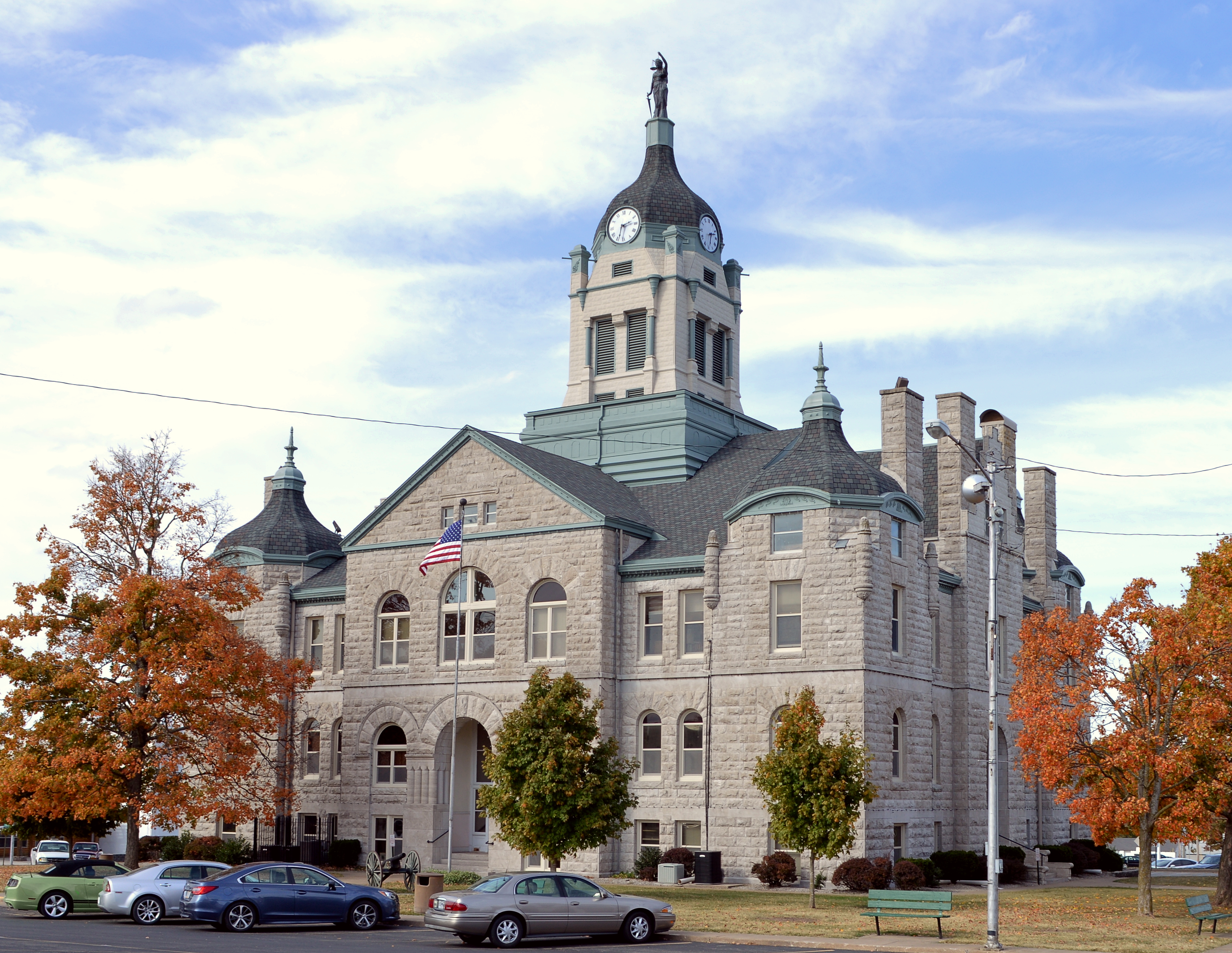
- Lawrence County Courthouse, October 2015

- Location within Missouri Location within the United States
- Location: City Sq., Mount Vernon, Missouri
- Coordinates: 37°6′12″N 93°49′6″W
- Area: less than one acre
- Built: 1900
- Architect: McDonald, G.E.; Miller, T.A.
- Architectural style: Romanesque
- NRHP reference No.: 80002374
- Added to NRHP: September 23, 1980

Lawrence County Courthouse is a historic courthouse located at Mount Vernon, Lawrence County, Missouri. It was built in 1900, and is a rectangular, 2 1/2-story, Romanesque Revival style limestone building. It measures 101 feet, 8 inches, by 81 feet, 2 inches. It features a central clock and bell tower surmounted with a statue of Lady Justice.

It was listed on the National Register of Historic Places in 1980.
