= White Oak Creek =

White Oak Creek may refer to:

- White Oak Creek (Georgia), a stream in Coweta County, Georgia
- White Oak Creek (Greenup County, Kentucky), a creek in Russell, Kentucky
- White Oak Creek (Sampson Creek tributary), a stream in Missouri
- White Oak Creek (Spring River tributary), a stream in Missouri
- White Oak Creek (New Hope River tributary), a stream in Chatham and Wake Counties, North Carolina
- White Oak Creek (Brown County, Ohio), a stream
- White Oak Creek (South Carolina)
- White Oak Creek (Tennessee), a tributary of the Tennessee River
- White Oak Creek (Sulphur River tributary) a stream in Texas
- White Oak Creek (Banister River tributary), a stream in Pittsylvania, Virginia
