= Logan, Missouri =

Logan is the name of two unincorporated communities in Missouri:

- Logan, Greene County, Missouri
- Logan, Lawrence County, Missouri
