= Opal, Missouri =

Unincorporated community in Missouri, U.S.

Coordinates: 37°01′16″N 93°46′13″W

Opal is an unincorporated community in Lawrence County, in the U.S. state of Missouri.

Opal is located on Missouri Route 39-Missouri Route 265 about midway between Mount Vernon to the northwest and Aurora to the southeast.

The community most likely has the first name of a local woman.
