= Logan, Lawrence County, Missouri =

Unincorporated community in Missouri, U.S.

Coordinates: 37°00′52″N 93°36′58″W

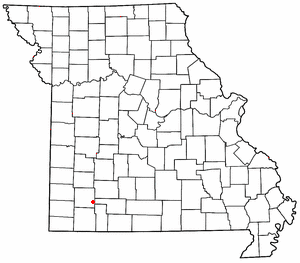

Logan is an unincorporated community in eastern Lawrence County, Missouri, United States. It is located off U.S. Route 60, one mile northeast of Marionville. Several homes are located there.

Logan was platted in 1870. The community has the name of William and Hetty E. Logan, original owners of the town site. A post office called Logan was established in 1871, and remained in operation until 1955.
