= Phelps, Missouri =

Unincorporated community in Missouri, U.S.

Coordinates: 37°11′23″N 93°54′09″W

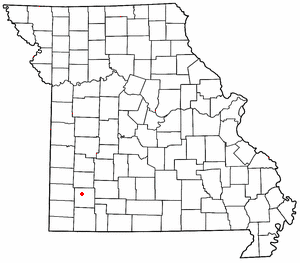

Phelps is an unincorporated community in Lawrence County, Missouri, United States. It lies along former U.S. Route 66 (Route 96), twenty-one miles east of Carthage.

A post office called Phelps was established in 1857, and remained in operation until 1864. The community has the name of Missouri Governor & Union Brigadier General John Smith Phelps
