= Stotts City, Missouri =

- City
- Location of Stotts City, Missouri
- Coordinates: 37°6′11″N 93°56′48″W
- Country: United States
- State: Missouri
- County: Lawrence

Area
  - Total: 0.51 sq mi (1.33 km^{2})
  - Land: 0.51 sq mi (1.33 km^{2})
  - Water: 0 sq mi (0.00 km^{2})
- Elevation: 1,145 ft (349 m)

Population (2020)
  - Total: 167
  - Density: 330/sq mi (126/km^{2})
- Time zone: UTC-6 (Central (CST))
  - Summer (DST): UTC-5 (CDT)
- ZIP code: 65756
- Area code: 417
- FIPS code: 29-70990
- GNIS feature ID: 0727160

Stotts City is a city in Lawrence County, Missouri, United States. As of the 2020 census, Stotts City had a population of 167. It was estimated to be 217 by the City of Stotts City as of July 1, 2019.

== Geography ==
Stotts City is located at 37°6′11″N 93°56′48″W (37.102983, -93.946662).

According to the United States Census Bureau, the city has a total area of 0.51 square miles (1.32 km^{2}), all land.

== Demographics ==
Historical population
Census	Pop.	Note	%±
1900	902		—
1910	548		−39.2%
1920	354		−35.4%
1930	271		−23.4%
1940	268		−1.1%
1950	285		6.3%
1960	221		−22.5%
1970	203		−8.1%
1980	232		14.3%
1990	235		1.3%
2000	250		6.4%
2010	220		−12.0%
2020	167		−24.1%
U.S. Decennial Census

=== 2010 census ===
As of the census of 2010, there were 220 people, 84 households, and 53 families residing in the city. The population density was 431.4 inhabitants per square mile (166.6/km^{2}). There were 108 housing units at an average density of 211.8 per square mile (81.8/km^{2}). The racial makeup of the city was 93.2% White, 0.9% African American, 0.5% Native American, 3.2% from other races, and 2.3% from two or more races. Hispanic or Latino of any race were 5.9% of the population.

There were 84 households, of which 28.6% had children under the age of 18 living with them, 45.2% were married couples living together, 11.9% had a female householder with no husband present, 6.0% had a male householder with no wife present, and 36.9% were non-families. 31.0% of all households were made up of individuals, and 14.3% had someone living alone who was 65 years of age or older. The average household size was 2.62 and the average family size was 3.09.

The median age in the city was 42 years. 20.9% of residents were under the age of 18; 6.9% were between the ages of 18 and 24; 27.3% were from 25 to 44; 27.8% were from 45 to 64; and 17.3% were 65 years of age or older. The gender makeup of the city was 50.0% male and 50.0% female.

=== 2000 census ===
As of the census of 2000, there were 250 people, 98 households, and 63 families residing in the city. The population density was 486.2 inhabitants per square mile (187.7/km^{2}). There were 117 housing units at an average density of 227.5 per square mile (87.8/km^{2}). The racial makeup of the city was 87.60% White, 1.20% African American, 4.00% Native American, 3.60% from other races, and 3.60% from two or more races. Hispanic or Latino of any race were 9.20% of the population.

There were 98 households, out of which 30.6% had children under the age of 18 living with them, 49.0% were married couples living together, 11.2% had a female householder with no husband present, and 34.7% were non-families. 30.6% of all households were made up of individuals, and 11.2% had someone living alone who was 65 years of age or older. The average household size was 2.55 and the average family size was 3.11.

In the city the population was spread out, with 26.8% under the age of 18, 9.2% from 18 to 24, 28.8% from 25 to 44, 19.6% from 45 to 64, and 15.6% who were 65 years of age or older. The median age was 35 years. For every 100 females, there were 110.1 males. For every 100 females age 18 and over, there were 101.1 males.

The median income for a household in the city was $18,958, and the median income for a family was $28,125. Males had a median income of $17,031 versus $16,250 for females. The per capita income for the city was $8,942. About 26.2% of families and 24.6% of the population were below the poverty line, including 24.1% of those under the age of eighteen and 36.6% of those 65 or over.

== History ==
The town was settled in the early 1870s and was originally known as 'Pax', then later as 'Belle Plaine'. It was incorporated in 1896 and renamed in memory of its founder, Capt. Greene Casey Stotts, who died in 1876. Stotts held a command in the US Army during the Civil War, distinguished himself while in charge of the 76th Enrolled Missouri Militia, Co. D, the 7th E Missouri Militia, Co. C, and the 15th Missouri Cavalry, Company C. He later represented Lawrence County in the Missouri state legislature.

Stotts discovered galena and hemimorphite deposits west of the town and began to develop the lead mining industry that later fueled Stotts City's booming growth. He founded the Stotts City Mining Company in July, 1873. The Lawrence County Land & Mining Company, formed in 1888, handled the product of the Stotts City Mining District.

In its heyday, Stotts City was home to several banks, a large hardware store, The Farmers Exchange Co-op, a cooperative enterprise of the local grain and dairy farmers, a school and numerous churches, and even had a volunteer brass band and a newspaper, The Stotts City Sunbeam, published from 1901 until the end of 1907. The population of Stotts City peaked at 902 in 1900. By 1910, the population dropped to 548.

Soon after the end of World War I, the demand for lead ore from the Lawrence County Land & Mining Company subsided, as groundwater issues made it increasing difficult and expensive to mine. With a depressed agricultural industry in the 1920s, the 1929 stock market crash and Great Depression, Stotts City suffered a further reduction in population, a loss of retail businesses and closure of its one remaining bank. By December 1942, the mines and the Stotts City Mining Company were closed.

The construction of U.S. Route 66 north of Stotts City and later, Interstate 44 south of town, provided an opportunity for increased commerce. Establishments such as "Hattie's Hamburger Heaven" became regional favorites.

In the 1930s and 1940s, the Farmers Exchange Co-op provided feed grain and seed for most of western Lawrence County. Until the mid-1970s, Stotts City bore a remarkable resemblance to the classic movie 'western town', with its wide main street and rows of buildings with false fronts. The old bandstand, at the corner of Mt. Vernon and Center streets, still stands; a relic of the late 19th century, as does the old native-stone schoolhouse and First Baptist Church, both built in 1898. Several descendants of the earliest residents of Stotts City still live in the area.

== Industry ==
Stotts City is surrounded by cattle and dairy farms, and the area is known for world-class thoroughbred horses. In 1981, Jim and Sallie Stearns established the Stearnsy Bears, with manufacturing in Stotts City. These heirloom-quality teddy bears have been featured on Hallmark and American Greetings cards, and are shipped worldwide.

== Notable people ==
Capt. Greene Casey Stotts USA, 1821-1876—American military officer and Missouri state legislator

PFC Charles Denver Barger, USA, 1892-1936—American soldier and hero of World War I, Medal of Honor recipient

Rev. Dr. H. Dale Jackson, 1930-2003—Baptist minister, denominational leader and ethicist
