= Paris Springs Junction, Missouri =

Unincorporated community in Missouri, U.S.

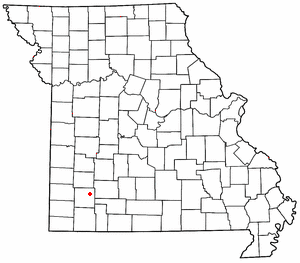

Paris Springs Junction is a small unincorporated community in Lawrence County, Missouri, United States. It lies along former U.S. Route 66 (now a county road west of the junction of Route 266 and Route 96), four miles (6 km) west of Halltown. Paris Springs Junction started as a few businesses on Route 66 and, with the decommissioning of that highway, has now become only homes. It was so named because of a former town named Paris Springs to the north. That town was founded in 1855 and survived until the time of Route 66's decommissioning.

== Paris Springs ==
Paris Springs is located on Section 29 in Ozark Township at 37°11′39″N 93°40′46″W. The settlement was first known as Johnson's Mills. Clover Creek was used in the 1850s by the firm of Cherry & Johnson, J.R. Johnson and W.F. Likens for mill power, and turned out flour and meal from each of their mills. The mill distributed their products over a large trade area.

Later there was O.P. Johnson's saw mill and woolen mill, also E.L. Davis chair factory. In the 1880s O.P. Johnson was postmaster. Paris Springs was a popular resort in the early part of the 1900s. The creek, was fed by several "chalybeate" or iron rich springs. A spring house sat in the middle of town, the ruins of which can still be found. It was about 20 x 20 feet (6.1 m) in size, with small stone walls laid out around the spring in a square. The spring house has a timber roof on a post and beam support. Not far from Paris Springs, is a large cave system, closed by the State of Missouri, to preserve its natural beauty and wildlife.

Elbridge Basswell Scott, was the Pastor of the Methodist Church. The church is one of the last public buildings left standing in the old town site. Pastor Scott was a general contractor and is said to have built the church in Paris Springs, Butterfield, and several other communities. Making his home in Paris Springs, he was a "Circuit Rider," was a pastor who traveled throughout an area or "Circuit." This system allowed for churches to be active in villages that would normally be too small to support a regular pastor or church. Pastor Scott died in a construction accident in Purdy, Missouri. Hundreds of people from around the region attended his funeral. Little remains of the old town since the closing of Route 66.
