= Rescue, Missouri =

Unincorporated community in Missouri, U.S.

Coordinates: 37°11′30″N 93°58′44″W

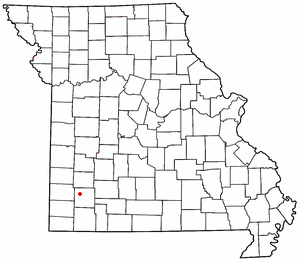

Rescue is a small unincorporated community in western Lawrence County, Missouri, United States. It lies along Route 96 (formerly U.S. Route 66), approximately eighteen miles east of Carthage.

A post office called Rescue was established in 1897, and remained in operation until 1904. It is unknown why the name Rescue was applied to this community.

The community did have a school until 2003, when the Miller R-II School District decided to close what was by then named "Miller West Elementary" due to declining enrollment.
