= Minden, Lawrence County, Missouri =

Minden, Missouri
- Interactive map of Minden, Missouri
- Coordinates: 36°58′45″N 93°54′59″W
- Country: United States
- State: Missouri
- County: Lawrence
- Time zone: UTC-6 (Central (CST))
  - Summer (DST): UTC-5 (CDT)

Minden is a ghost town in Lawrence County, Missouri, United States. It possessed a post office from 1860 to 1873.

== Historical records ==
The Geographic Names Information System (GNIS) has an entry for "Minden School (historical)" at coordinates 36°58′45″N 93°54′59″W.

GNIS also has a listing for "Minden Post Office (historical)" with a location of unknown.
