= Lawrenceburg, Missouri =

Unincorporated community in Missouri, U.S.

Coordinates: 37°14′40″N 93°39′37″W

Lawrenceburg is an unincorporated community in Lawrence County, in the U.S. state of Missouri.

== History ==
A post office called Lawrenceburg was established in 1876, and remained in operation until 1914. The community took its name from Lawrence County.
