= Stinson, Missouri =

Unincorporated community in Missouri, U.S.

Coordinates: 37°14′47″N 93°45′09″W

Stinson is an unincorporated community in Lawrence County, in the U.S. state of Missouri.

== History ==
A post office called Stinson was established in 1895, and remained in operation until 1906. J. L. Stinston, an early postmaster, gave the community his last name.
