= Hoberg, Missouri =

- Village
- Location of Hoberg, Missouri
- Coordinates: 37°4′6″N 93°50′58″W
- Country: United States
- State: Missouri
- County: Lawrence

Area
  - Total: 0.054 sq mi (0.14 km^{2})
  - Land: 0.054 sq mi (0.14 km^{2})
  - Water: 0 sq mi (0.00 km^{2})
- Elevation: 1,165 ft (355 m)

Population (2020)
  - Total: 48
  - Density: 888.3/sq mi (342.96/km^{2})
- Time zone: UTC-6 (Central (CST))
  - Summer (DST): UTC-5 (CDT)
- ZIP code: 65712
- Area code: 417
- FIPS code: 29-32410
- GNIS feature ID: 0719649

Hoberg is a village in Lawrence County, Missouri, United States. The population was 48 at the 2020 census.

== History ==
A post office called Hoberg was established in 1905, and remained in operation until 1968. The community has the name of Henry Hoberg, a pioneer settler.

== Geography ==
Hoberg is located along the southwest bank of the Spring River and approximately three miles southwest of Mount Vernon. The Missouri Pacific Railroad line passes along the northeast side of the community.

According to the United States Census Bureau, the village has a total area of 0.05 square miles (0.13 km^{2}), all land.

== Demographics ==
Historical population
Census	Pop.	Note	%±
1930	95		—
1940	83		−12.6%
1950	90		8.4%
1960	75		−16.7%
1970	64		−14.7%
1980	77		20.3%
1990	62		−19.5%
2000	60		−3.2%
2010	56		−6.7%
2020	48		−14.3%
U.S. Decennial Census

=== 2010 census ===
As of the census of 2010, there were 56 people, 21 households, and 14 families living in the village. The population density was 1,120.0 inhabitants per square mile (432.4/km^{2}). There were 29 housing units at an average density of 580.0 per square mile (223.9/km^{2}). The racial makeup of the village was 91.1% White, 5.4% from other races, and 3.6% from two or more races. Hispanic or Latino of any race were 10.7% of the population.

There were 21 households, of which 38.1% had children under the age of 18 living with them, 57.1% were married couples living together, 9.5% had a male householder with no wife present, and 33.3% were non-families. 19.0% of all households were made up of individuals, and 4.8% had someone living alone who was 65 years of age or older. The average household size was 2.67 and the average family size was 3.14.

The median age in the village was 29 years. 28.6% of residents were under the age of 18; 5.4% were between the ages of 18 and 24; 39.4% were from 25 to 44; 17.9% were from 45 to 64; and 8.9% were 65 years of age or older. The gender makeup of the village was 51.8% male and 48.2% female.

=== 2000 census ===
As of the census of 2000, there were 60 people, 24 households, and 19 families living in the village. The population density was 1,032.2 inhabitants per square mile (398.5/km^{2}). There were 29 housing units at an average density of 498.9 per square mile (192.6/km^{2}). The racial makeup of the village was 100.00% White.

There were 24 households, out of which 37.5% had children under the age of 18 living with them, 62.5% were married couples living together, 4.2% had a female householder with no husband present, and 20.8% were non-families. 20.8% of all households were made up of individuals, and 8.3% had someone living alone who was 65 years of age or older. The average household size was 2.50 and the average family size was 2.74.

In the village, the population was spread out, with 23.3% under the age of 18, 13.3% from 18 to 24, 30.0% from 25 to 44, 23.3% from 45 to 64, and 10.0% who were 65 years of age or older. The median age was 34 years. For every 100 females, there were 93.5 males. For every 100 females age 18 and over, there were 109.1 males.

The median income for a household in the village was $21,250, and the median income for a family was $24,167. Males had a median income of $16,875 versus $32,500 for females. The per capita income for the village was $10,121. There were 27.8% of families and 32.1% of the population living below the poverty line, including 18.2% of under eighteens and 14.3% of those over 64.
