= Clarkson, Missouri =

Unincorporated community in the US state of Missouri

Coordinates: 37°02′56″N 94°00′18″W

Clarkson is an unincorporated community in Lawrence County, in the U.S. state of Missouri.

== History ==
A post office called Clarkson was established in 1889, and remained in operation until 1903. The community was named after a postal official.
