= Elliott, Missouri =

Unincorporated community in Missouri

Coordinates: 37°02′34″N 93°44′52″W

Elliott is an unincorporated community in Lawrence County, in the U.S. state of Missouri.

The community was named after the original owner (George Calvin Elliott) of the town site.
