= Spring River (Missouri) =

River in Kansas, Missouri, and Oklahoma, U.S.

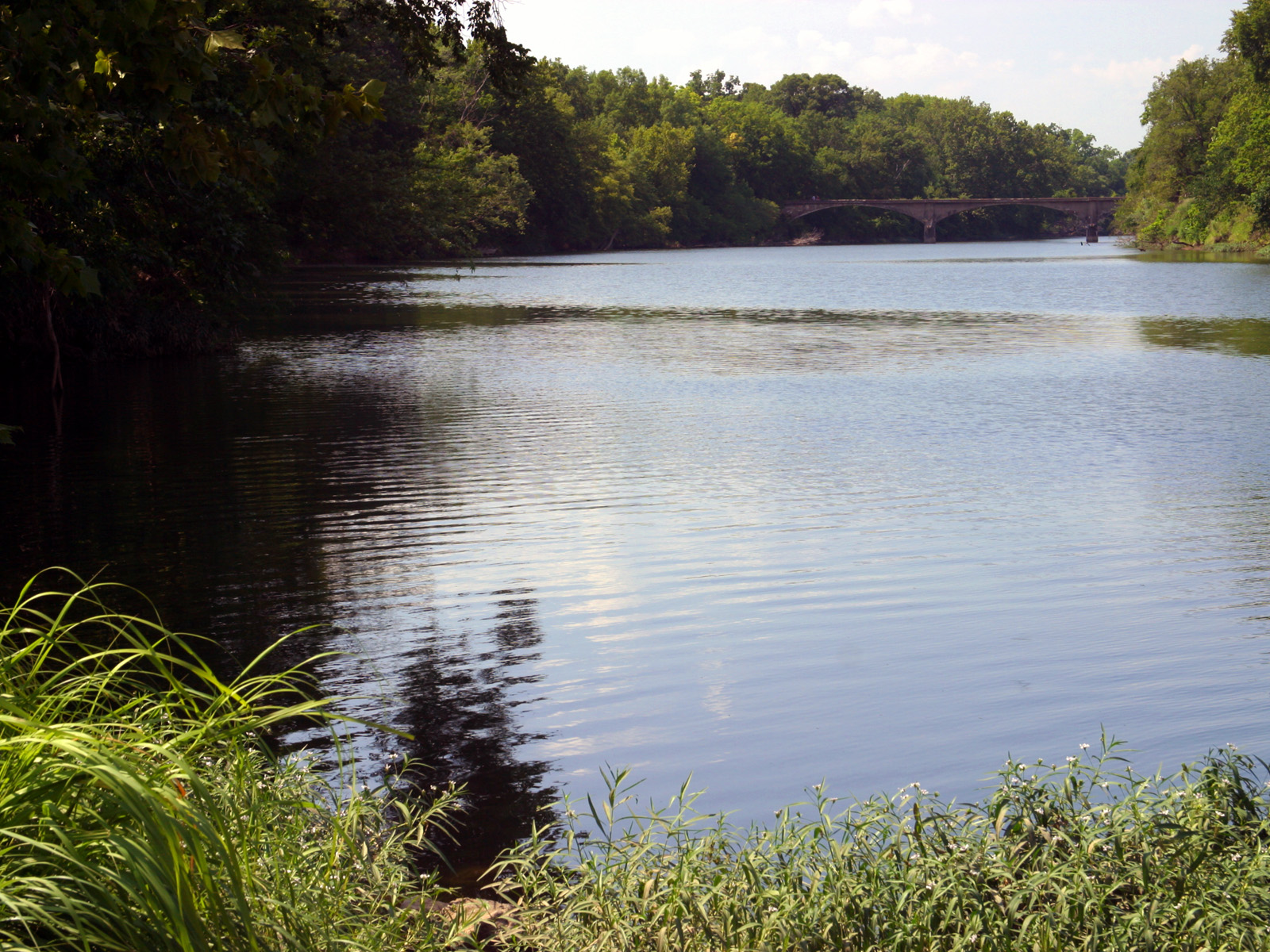
Spring River from Riverside Park in Baxter Springs, Kansas

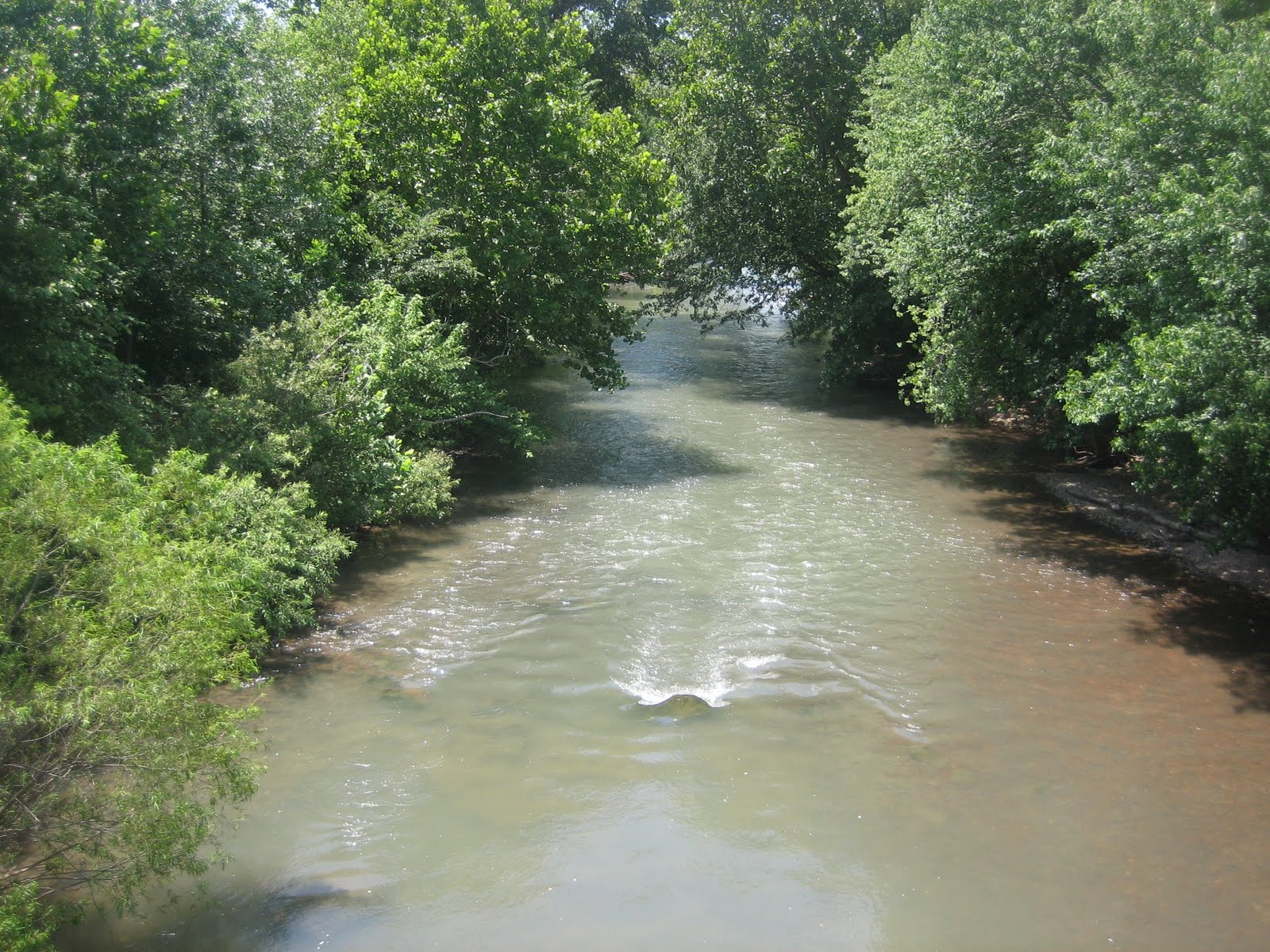
Spring River as seen near La Russell, Jasper County, Missouri.

The Spring River is a 129-mile-long (208 km) waterway located in southwestern Missouri, southeastern Kansas, and northeastern Oklahoma.

The headwaters of Spring River arise in northern Barry County south of Verona at (36°54′55″N 93°42′50″W. The stream flows north into Lawrence County and passes under US Route 60. The stream meanders through the west side of Verona and passes under I-44 southwest of Mount Vernon. The stream continues west into Jasper County and passes through the north side of Carthage and under US Route 71. It meanders to the northwest and enters Cherokee County, Kansas just west of Carl Junction. It flows past the east sides of Riverton and Baxter Springs then enters northeast Oklahoma. It passes under I-44 again southeast of Quapaw and enters the Neosho River at the north end of the Grand Lake of the Cherokees west of Wyandotte.

== History ==
The Spring River takes its name from the many seeps and springs that provide its baseflow. Big Spring in Lawrence County is the largest spring in the Spring River basin, discharging 12.3 million gallons of water per day. The spring flows from the base of a high bluff of Burlington Keokuk limestone known as Baptist Hill, and enters the Spring River about 200 feet away. The river forms the western boundary of the Ozarks in southwest Missouri and southeast Kansas. All of the Ozark area in southeast Kansas is contained within the Spring River basin.

The river was important to Native American tribes and later European-American settlers in Lawrence and Jasper County, especially around Carthage, where it was not yet too wide to dam. Scores of grist and sawmills were established on the river in those counties beginning as early as the 1840s. A dam erected northeast of Carthage in 1875 provided water power to mills and other industry through a mile-long millrace, which fed into an industrial basin on north Main street. The concentration of industry there continues to affect the water quality in the river.

Spring River was one of the "Seven Bulls," a term used by Native American tribes to describe the rivers of southwest Missouri.

At Quapaw, the river has a mean annual discharge of 2,209 cubic feet per second (62.6 cubic metres per second).

== Ecology ==
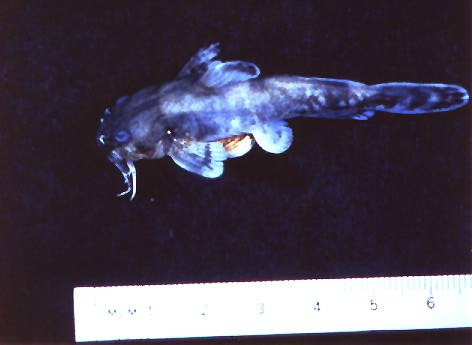
The Neosho madtom, Noturus placidus, is one of several threatened species found in the Spring River basin, Spring River Missouri

The Kansas Department of Health and Environment and the Kansas Department of Wildlife and Parks currently has a health advisory against the consumption of fish, shellfish and aquatic wildlife of Spring River from the confluence of Center Creek to the Kansas/Oklahoma border in Cherokee County, Kansas due to lead and cadmium contamination. Effluents from sewage treatment facilities enter streams at several locations. Numerous industries, mines, subdivisions, and mobile home parks, all have permits to discharge treated wastes into Spring River watershed. Potential sources of non-point source pollution in the basin include: runoff from mine tailings and active mining sites, dairy operations, poultry husbandry, sedimentation from erosion in disturbed watersheds, sludge application from sewage treatment facilities, seepage from septic tanks, and runoff from urban areas. A health advisory, recommending against the consumption of fish from the Spring River from Verona, Missouri to Hoberg, Missouri because of dioxin contamination from runoff at a manufacturing plant, was issued during the late 1980s, but was lifted in 1993.

Eighty-six fish species and thirty-five mussel species have been collected in the Spring River basin. Common sportfish include smallmouth bass, largemouth bass, spotted bass, white crappie, rock bass and channel catfish. There are several state or federally listed threatened and endangered species, including the Ozark cavefish, Neosho madtom, redfin darter, Arkansas darter, western fanshell, Neosho mucket, bluntface shiner, and western slim minnow.

== See also ==
- List of rivers of Kansas
- List of rivers of Missouri
- List of rivers of Oklahoma
