= Orange, Missouri =

Unincorporated community in Missouri, U.S.

Coordinates: 37°02′42″N 93°43′01″W

Orange is an unincorporated community in Lawrence County, in the U.S. state of Missouri.

== History ==
A post office called Orange was established in 1894, and remained in operation until 1903. The origin of the name Orange is uncertain.
