= Spencer, Missouri =

Unincorporated crossroads in Missouri, U.S.

Coordinates: 37°11′04″N 93°42′09″W

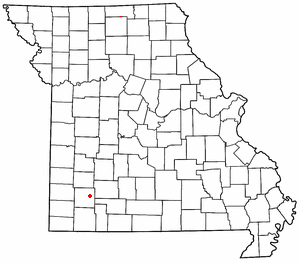

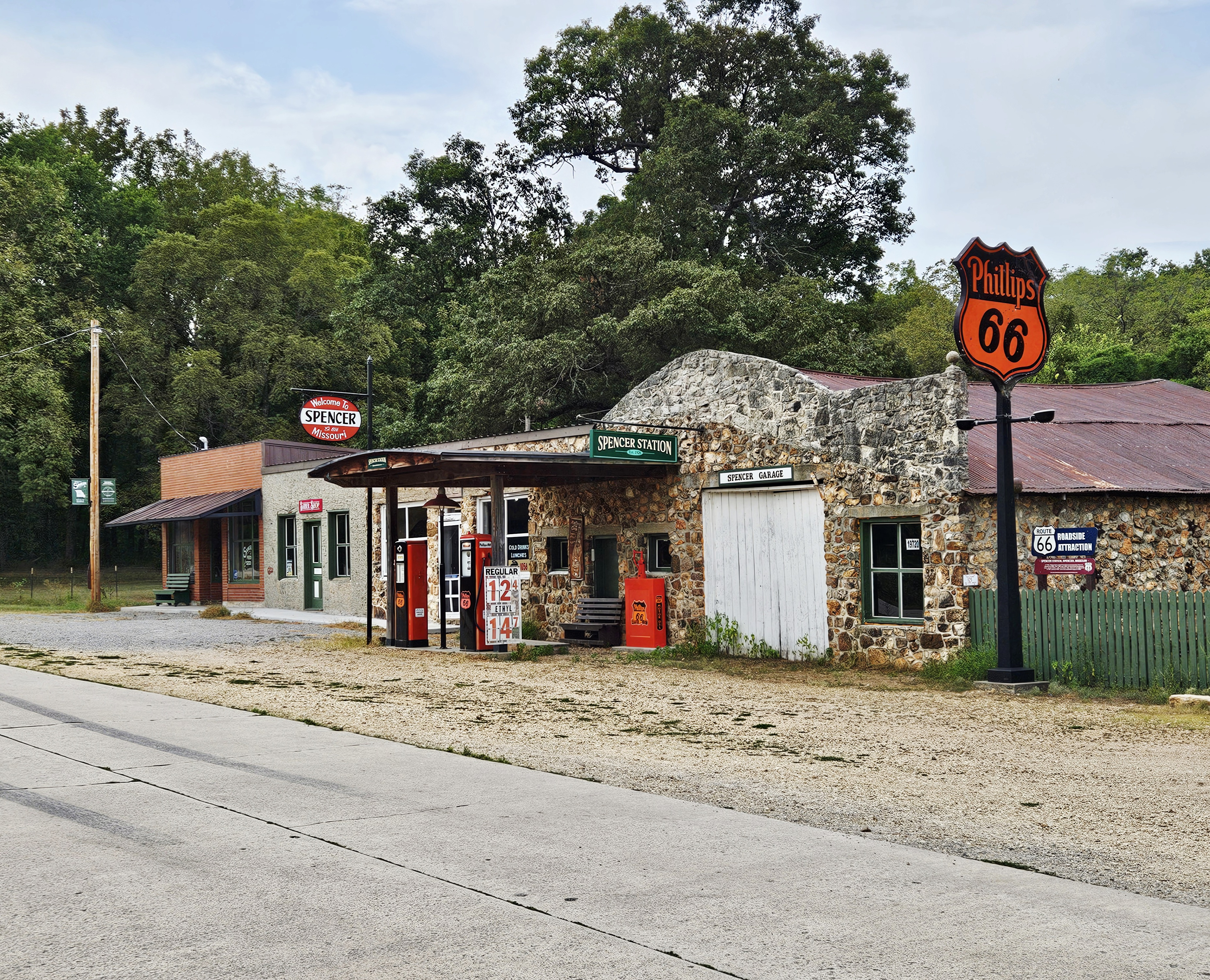

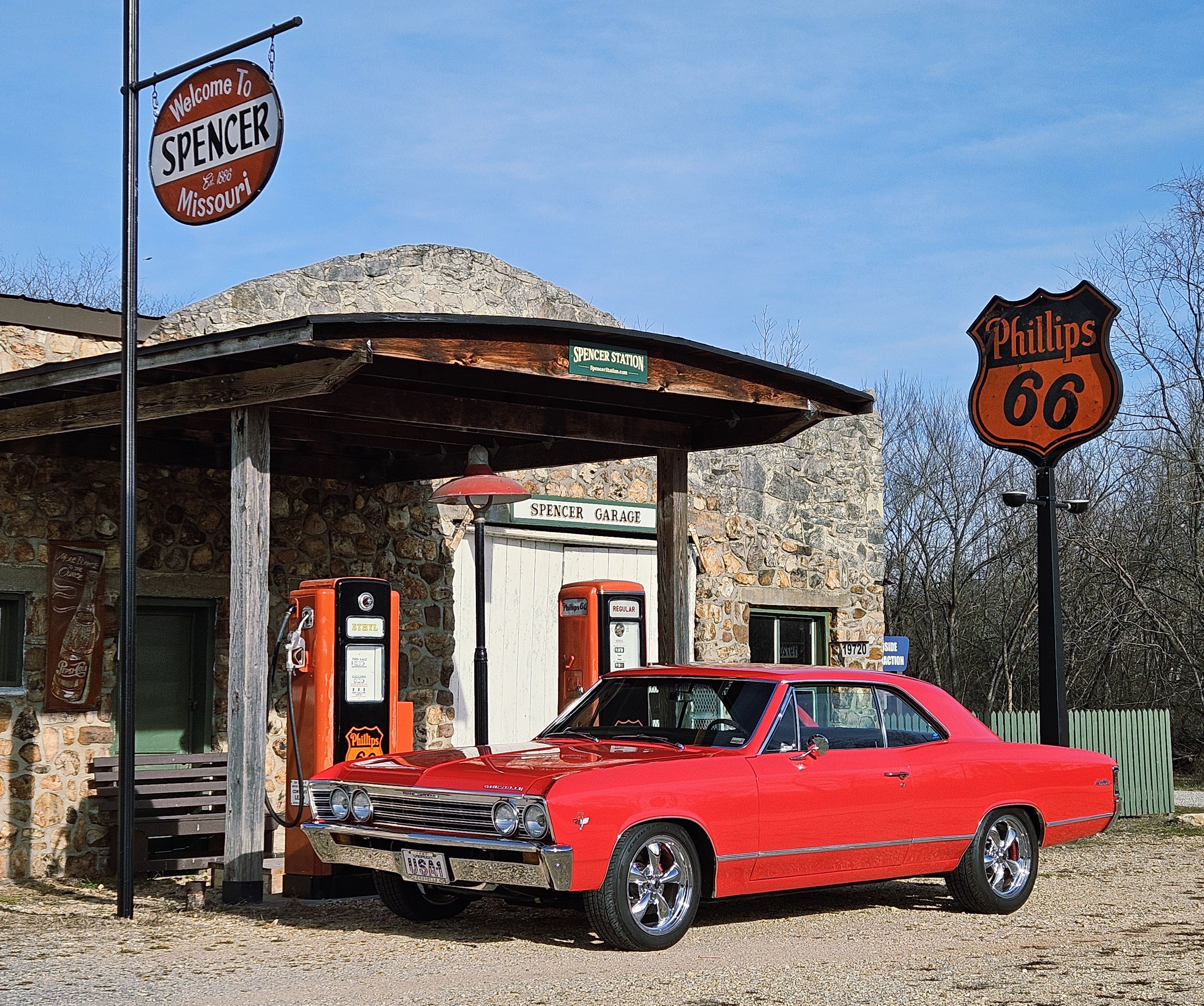

Spencer is in eastern Lawrence County, Missouri, United States. It lies along former U.S. Route 66 (now a state road) approximately six miles (10 km) west of Halltown.

A post office called Spencer was established in 1868, and remained in operation until 1907. The community was named after a local merchant. By the 1910s, the road was in bad shape and the population dwindled.

In 1925 Sydney Casey walked and hitchhiked 55 miles from his home in Bull Shoals, Missouri to purchased the 2 acre property and a 1860 Johnson Mercantile building in Spencer, for $500, as he knew a US Highway would be aligned along the old stagecoach route. That US Highway ended up being Route 66. The original 1860 building was falling into disrepair, so Casey built the buildings that are still standing there (barber shop, store, cafe and gas station) and catered to travelers. This lasted until 1961, when the old US 66 was realigned north of Spencer literally bypassing it.

Spencer is best known for Spencer Station (http://www.spencerstation.com), a series of joined buildings consisting of a historic Phillips 66 service station and garage, a diner, a barbershop and a general store. The general store was built in 1926 while the service station was built in 1927. In 1928, the two separate buildings were connected with the barber shop and diner.

Spencer Station is currently under restoration with the plans to open it up again as a diner, Barbershop Museum and a General Store Museum with a gift shop.
