= Grays Point, Missouri =

Unincorporated community in Missouri, U.S.

Coordinates: 37°14′46″N 93°58′39″W

Grays Point is an unincorporated community in Lawrence County, in the U.S. state of Missouri.

== History ==
A post office called Gray's Point was established in 1866, and remained in operation until 1905. The community was named after the original owner of the site.
