= Round Grove, Missouri =

Unincorporated community in Missouri, U.S.

Coordinates: 37°16′00″N 93°54′19″W

Round Grove is an unincorporated community in Lawrence County, in the U.S. state of Missouri.

== History ==
A post office called Round Grove was established in 1871, and remained in operation until 1907. The community was named for a round grove near the original town site.
