= Plew, Missouri =

Unincorporated community in the US state of Missouri

Coordinates: 37°11′34″N 94°02′13″W

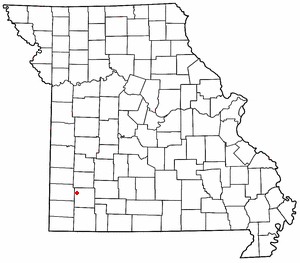

Plew (also spelled Plu) is a small unincorporated community in western Lawrence County, Missouri, United States. Plew is located on former U.S. Route 66, now Route 96.

A post office called Plew was established in 1893, and remained in operation until 1904. It is unknown why the name Plew was applied to this community.
