= Red Oak, Missouri =

Unincorporated community in the US state of Missouri

Coordinates: 37°13′43″N 94°00′41″W

Red Oak is an unincorporated community in Lawrence County, in the U.S. state of Missouri.

== History ==
A post office called Redoak was established in 1877, and remained in operation until 1922. The community took its name from Red Oak Township.
