= Olinger, Missouri =

Unincorporated community in Missouri, U.S.

Coordinates: 37°16′36″N 93°50′14″W

Olinger is an unincorporated community in Lawrence County, in the U.S. state of Missouri.

== History ==
A post office called Olinger was established in 1902, and remained in operation until 1917. The community has the name of John Olinger, the original owner of the site.
