= Marionville, Missouri =

- City
- Location of Marionville, Missouri
- Coordinates: 37°0′1″N 93°38′17″W
- Country: United States
- State: Missouri
- County: Lawrence

Government
  - Mayor: Dale Blankenship

Area
  - Total: 1.79 sq mi (4.63 km^{2})
  - Land: 1.78 sq mi (4.62 km^{2})
  - Water: 0 sq mi (0.00 km^{2})
- Elevation: 1,365 ft (416 m)

Population (2020)
  - Total: 2,054
  - Density: 1,150.5/sq mi (444.22/km^{2})
- Time zone: UTC-6 (Central (CST))
  - Summer (DST): UTC-5 (CDT)
- ZIP code: 65705
- Area code: 417
- FIPS code: 29-46172
- GNIS feature ID: 0721871
- Website: www.marionvillemo.gov

Marionville is a city in Lawrence County, Missouri, United States. As of the 2020 census, Marionville had a population of 2,054.

Marionville is known for its large population of white squirrels.

== History ==
Marionville was platted in 1854. The city name has been erroneously attributed as namesake of Francis Marion. It is, in fact, named to honor early settler and founder, James Marion Moore. Other names were considered - Jamestown/Jamesville and Moorestown/Mooresville - but were already taken and Moore's middle name was then used. A post office called Marionville has been in operation since 1864. On March 12, 2006, a tornado hit the town, destroying houses and killing two people. It was rated as an F3.

The town's two most famous residents are a colony of white squirrels (inhabitants since the 1880s) and legendary tubist Harvey Phillips.

== Geography ==
Marionville is located at 37°0′1″N 93°38′17″W (37.000361, -93.638026).

According to the United States Census Bureau, the city has a total area of 1.76 square miles (4.56 km^{2}), all land.

Marionville has a population of white squirrels, which is one of a handful of such populations in the United States. They can be seen in yards near the Ozarks Methodist Manor.

== Government ==
On April 21, 2014, the Marionville mayor, Dan Clevenger, resigned. After longtime resident and career bigot Frazier Glenn Miller Jr. shot and killed three people outside a Jewish Community Center in Overland Park, Kansas, reporters found out that Clevenger knew Miller and asked him about their relationship. Clevenger initially stuttered that he supported Miller's beliefs but not his actions. Clevenger's lost history of serving as Miller's mouthpiece for anti-Semitic rants were widely reported, and Clevenger made a bumbling series of remarks that centered around him recalling how nice Miller was (as long as he was interacting with other white men) and that he still felt "some" of Miller's conspiracy theories about Jews being evil were accurate (they weren't, and Clevenger was further discredited by confirmation of this). Two Marionville officials stated they would not serve in a government that included Clevenger and resigned from service, and a 4–1 vote by aldermen to begin the impeachment process prompted Clevenger's decision to quit. Clevenger later said that none of his opponents were against his views and simply used his actions as an excuse to get his office, and speculated that he would be able to win back the Mayor's office in the near future. As of 2026, Clevenger has not attempted any such campaigns.

== Demographics ==
Historical population
| Census | Pop. | Note | %± |
|---|---|---|---|
| 1870 | 272 | | — |
| 1880 | 432 | | 58.8% |
| 1890 | 1,159 | | 168.3% |
| 1900 | 1,290 | | 11.3% |
| 1910 | 1,272 | | −1.4% |
| 1920 | 1,167 | | −8.3% |
| 1930 | 1,227 | | 5.1% |
| 1940 | 1,127 | | −8.1% |
| 1950 | 1,167 | | 3.5% |
| 1960 | 1,251 | | 7.2% |
| 1970 | 1,496 | | 19.6% |
| 1980 | 1,920 | | 28.3% |
| 1990 | 1,920 | | 0.0% |
| 2000 | 2,113 | | 10.1% |
| 2010 | 2,225 | | 5.3% |
| 2020 | 2,054 | | −7.7% |
U.S. Decennial Census

=== 2020 census ===
As of the 2020 census, Marionville had a population of 2,054. The median age was 41.9 years. 22.0% of residents were under the age of 18 and 25.3% of residents were 65 years of age or older. For every 100 females there were 95.2 males, and for every 100 females age 18 and over there were 89.4 males age 18 and over.

0.0% of residents lived in urban areas, while 100.0% lived in rural areas.

There were 868 households in Marionville, of which 28.2% had children under the age of 18 living in them. Of all households, 41.0% were married-couple households, 18.1% were households with a male householder and no spouse or partner present, and 32.3% were households with a female householder and no spouse or partner present. About 33.9% of all households were made up of individuals and 18.6% had someone living alone who was 65 years of age or older.

There were 1,002 housing units, of which 13.4% were vacant. The homeowner vacancy rate was 3.2% and the rental vacancy rate was 15.0%.

Racial composition as of the 2020 census
| Race | Number | Percent |
|---|---|---|
| White | 1,856 | 90.4% |
| Black or African American | 5 | 0.2% |
| American Indian and Alaska Native | 17 | 0.8% |
| Asian | 5 | 0.2% |
| Native Hawaiian and Other Pacific Islander | 0 | 0.0% |
| Some other race | 33 | 1.6% |
| Two or more races | 138 | 6.7% |
| Hispanic or Latino (of any race) | 109 | 5.3% |

=== 2010 census ===
As of the census of 2010, there were 2,225 people, 900 households, and 587 families living in the city. The population density was 1,264.2 inhabitants per square mile (488.1/km^{2}). There were 1,018 housing units at an average density of 578.4 units per square mile (223.3 units/km^{2}). The racial makeup of the city was 96.3% White, 0.4% Native American, 0.4% Asian, 0.3% from other races, and 2.6% from two or more races. Hispanic or Latino of any race were 1.5% of the population.

There were 900 households, of which 31.3% had children under the age of 18 living with them, 48.3% were married couples living together, 12.4% had a female householder with no husband present, 4.4% had a male householder with no wife present, and 34.8% were non-families. 30.0% of all households were made up of individuals, and 16.8% had someone living alone who was 65 years of age or older. The average household size was 2.39 and the average family size was 2.92.

The median age in the city was 40.5 years. 24.4% of residents were under the age of 18; 7.8% were between the ages of 18 and 24; 22.1% were from 25 to 44; 22.6% were from 45 to 64; and 23% were 65 years of age or older. The gender makeup of the city was 45.7% male and 54.3% female.

=== 2000 census ===
As of the census of 2000, there were 2,113 people, 871 households and 562 families living in the city. The population density was 1,525.6 inhabitants per square mile (589.0/km^{2}). There were 993 housing units at an average density of 716.9 units per square mile (276.8 units/km^{2}). The racial makeup of the city was 97.11% White, 0.09% African American, 0.66% Native American, 0.38% Asian, 0.33% from other races, and 1.42% from two or more races. Hispanic, Latino or any other race accounted for 0.62% of the population.

There were 871 households, out of which 30.1% had children under the age of 18, 48.8% were married couples living together, 11.5% had a female householder with no husband present, 0.12% had a female household with someone else's husband present, and 35.4% were non-families. Approximately 30.9% of all households were made up of individuals, and 17.3% had someone living alone who was 65 years of age or older. The average household size was 2.30, and the average family size was 2.86.

In the city, 24.5% of the population were under the age of 18, 8.5% were ages 18 to 24, 25.7% were ages 25 to 44, 18.4% were ages 45 to 64, and 22.9% were 65 or older. The median age was 38 years. For every 100 females, there were 83.6 males. For every 100 females age 18 and over, there were 78.8 males.

The median household income in Marionville was $25,078 per year at the time of the census, and the median income for a family was $30,607 per year. Males had a median income of $24,792 per year, versus $17,188 per year for females. The per capita income for the city was $13,552 annually. About 19.5% of families and 22.0% of the population were below the poverty line, including 32.7% of those under age 18 and 9.0% of those age 65 or over.

== Education ==
Marionville R-IX School District operates one elementary school, one middle school, and Marionville High School.

Marionville has a public library, a branch of the Barry-Lawrence Regional Library.

== Notable people ==
- Robert Guthrie (1916-1995), microbiologist
- Donald Owens (born 1926), religious leader
- Vic Rapp (1929-2016), football coach
- Lynn Browning (1909-1956), actress
