= Halltown, Missouri =

- Village
- Location of Halltown, Missouri
- Coordinates: 37°11′37″N 93°37′45″W
- Country: United States
- State: Missouri
- County: Lawrence

Area
  - Total: 0.21 sq mi (0.55 km^{2})
  - Land: 0.21 sq mi (0.55 km^{2})
  - Water: 0 sq mi (0.00 km^{2})
- Elevation: 1,175 ft (358 m)

Population (2020)
  - Total: 104
  - Density: 494.2/sq mi (190.81/km^{2})
- Time zone: UTC-6 (Central (CST))
  - Summer (DST): UTC-5 (CDT)
- ZIP code: 65664
- Area code: 417
- FIPS code: 29-30016
- GNIS feature ID: 0758433

Halltown is a village in Lawrence County, Missouri, United States. As of the 2020 census, Halltown had a population of 104.

== Geography ==
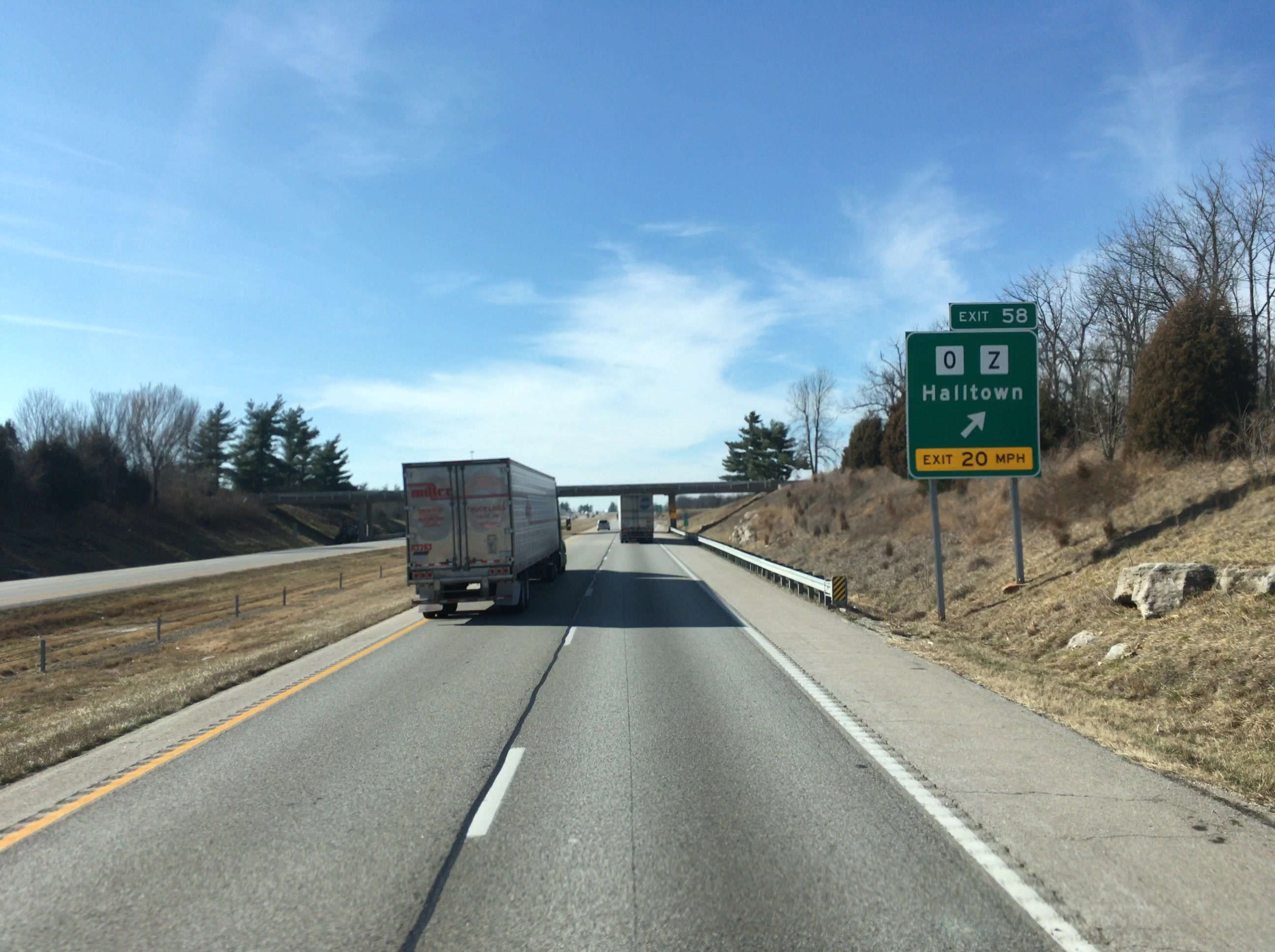
Westbound Interstate 44 at Halltown exit 58

Halltown is located at 37°11′37″N 93°37′45″W (37.193735, -93.629059).

According to the United States Census Bureau, the village has a total area of 0.21 square miles (0.54 km^{2}), all land.

== History ==
Halltown was platted in 1887, and named after the Hall family, original owners of the site. A post office has been in operation at Halltown since 1879.

== Demographics ==
Historical population
Census	Pop.	Note	%±
1930	114		—
1940	168		47.4%
1950	99		−41.1%
1960	86		−13.1%
1970	106		23.3%
1980	149		40.6%
1990	161		8.1%
2000	189		17.4%
2010	173		−8.5%
2020	104		−39.9%
U.S. Decennial Census

=== 2010 census ===
As of the census of 2010, there were 173 people, 70 households, and 45 families living in the village. The population density was 823.8 inhabitants per square mile (318.1/km^{2}). There were 88 housing units at an average density of 419.0 per square mile (161.8/km^{2}). The racial makeup of the village was 100.0% White.

There were 70 households, of which 35.7% had children under the age of 18 living with them, 44.3% were married couples living together, 10.0% had a female householder with no husband present, 10.0% had a male householder with no wife present, and 35.7% were non-families. 31.4% of all households were made up of individuals, and 4.3% had someone living alone who was 65 years of age or older. The average household size was 2.47 and the average family size was 3.09.

The median age in the village was 34.8 years. 30.6% of residents were under the age of 18; 6.3% were between the ages of 18 and 24; 27.2% were from 25 to 44; 24.8% were from 45 to 64; and 11% were 65 years of age or older. The gender makeup of the village was 50.3% male and 49.7% female.

=== 2000 census ===
As of the census of 2000, there were 189 people, 69 households, and 50 families living in the village. The population density was 908.0 inhabitants per square mile (350.6/km^{2}). There were 74 housing units at an average density of 355.5 per square mile (137.3/km^{2}). The racial makeup of the village was 98.94% White, and 1.06% from two or more races.

There were 69 households, out of which 36.2% had children under the age of 18 living with them, 53.6% were married couples living together, 15.9% had a female householder with no husband present, and 27.5% were non-families. 20.3% of all households were made up of individuals, and 7.2% had someone living alone who was 65 years of age or older. The average household size was 2.74 and the average family size was 3.20.

In the village, the population was spread out, with 31.2% under the age of 18, 12.7% from 18 to 24, 32.3% from 25 to 44, 17.5% from 45 to 64, and 6.3% who were 65 years of age or older. The median age was 30 years. For every 100 females, there were 80.0 males. For every 100 females age 18 and over, there were 80.6 males.

The median income for a household in the village was $30,833, and the median income for a family was $37,969. Males had a median income of $21,250 versus $19,375 for females. The per capita income for the village was $10,301. About 12.2% of families and 11.3% of the population were below the poverty line, including 10.1% of those under the age of eighteen and 42.9% of those 65 or over.
