= Lawrence County, Missouri =

County in Missouri, United States

- County
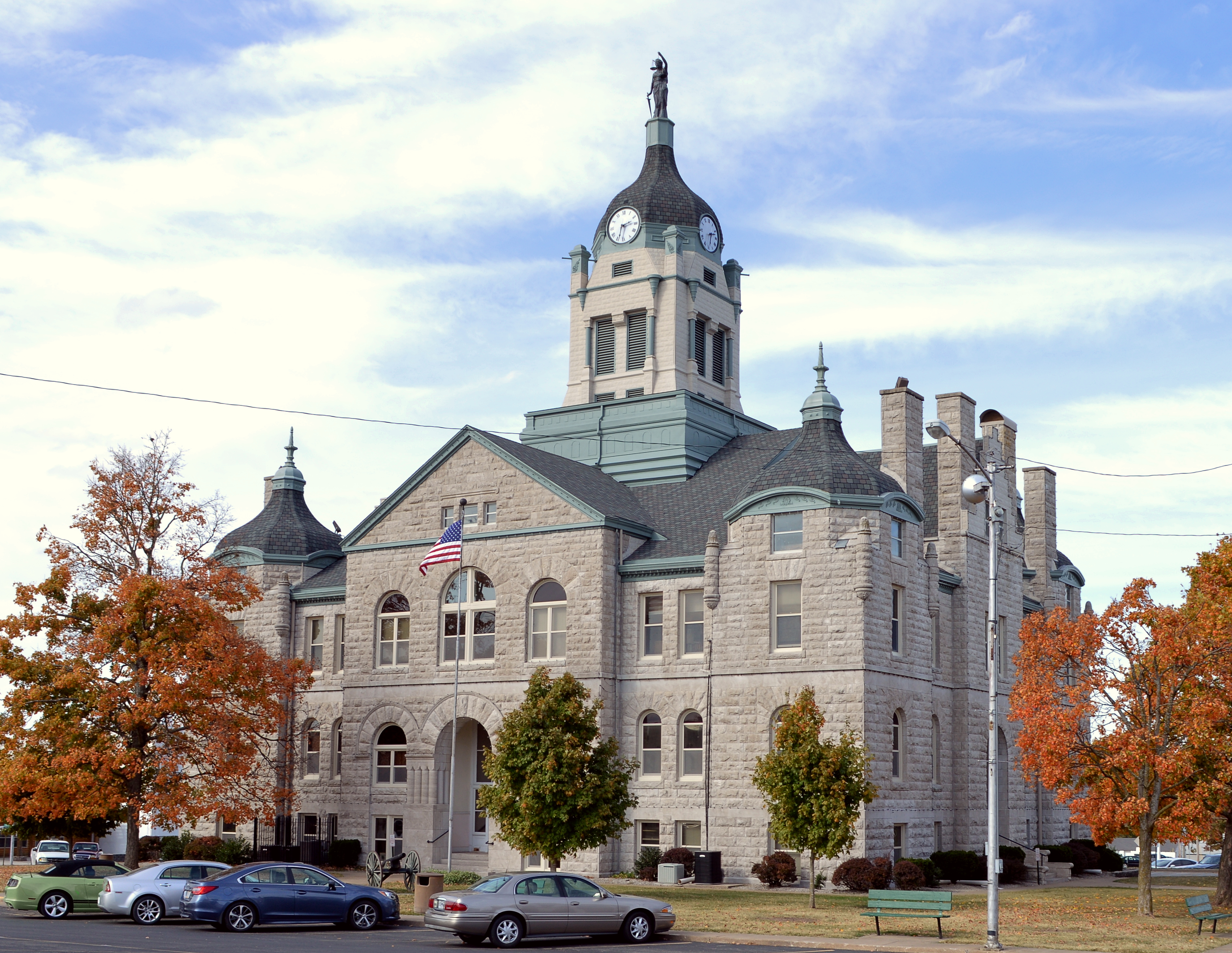
- The Lawrence County Courthouse in Mt. Vernon

- Location within the U.S. state of Missouri
- Coordinates: 37°07′N 93°50′W
- Country: United States
- State: Missouri
- Founded: February 14, 1845
- Named for: James Lawrence
- Seat: Mount Vernon
- Largest city: Monett

Area
  - Total: 613 sq mi (1,590 km^{2})
  - Land: 612 sq mi (1,590 km^{2})
  - Water: 1.6 sq mi (4.1 km^{2}) 0.3%

Population (2020)
  - Total: 38,001
  - Estimate (2025): 39,401 ▲
  - Density: 62.1/sq mi (24.0/km^{2})
- Time zone: UTC−6 (Central)
  - Summer (DST): UTC−5 (CDT)
- Congressional district: 7th
- Website: www.lawrencecountymo.org

Lawrence County is located in the southwest portion of the U.S. state of Missouri, in the area of the Ozarks. As of the 2020 census, the population was 38,001. Its county seat is Mount Vernon. The county was organized in 1845 and named for James Lawrence, a naval officer from the War of 1812 known for his battle cry, "Don't give up the ship!"

A previous Lawrence County, established in 1815 with its county seat at what is now Davidsonville Historic State Park in Arkansas, covered much of what is now southern Missouri and the northern third of Arkansas. When the Arkansas Territory was created from Missouri Territory in 1819, some of that earlier county became organized as Lawrence County, Arkansas.

Just before that, in 1818, Missouri divided its part of the old Lawrence County into Wayne County and Madison County; with population increases, those counties were later divided into others, including the present Lawrence County.

== Racial history ==
Following the Reconstruction era, southwestern Missouri became increasingly hostile to African Americans, and whites attacked blacks in Lawrence and other counties, seeking to expel them from the region. An African-American man was lynched in Verona, Missouri on January 26, 1894; his name was not recorded. On August 19, 1901, three men were lynched by a white mob in the county seat, Pierce City, in Lawrence County. The mob also burned down some black homes, and drove roughly 30 families, a total of 300 African Americans, out of the city altogether. Whites took over their properties and the African Americans were never compensated for losses.

As a result of such incidents, many African Americans left Southwest Missouri in the early 20th century. The extrajudicial murders were part of a pattern of discrimination, repeated violence and intimidation of African Americans in southwest Missouri from 1894 to 1909. Whites in Greene conducted a mass lynching of three African-Americans in 1906 in the courthouse square.

== Geography ==
According to the U.S. Census Bureau, the county has a total area of 613 square miles (1,590 km^{2}), of which 612 square miles (1,590 km^{2}) is land and 1.6 square miles (4.1 km^{2}) (0.3%) is water. Ozark Cavefish National Wildlife Refuge is located in Lawrence County.

=== Adjacent counties ===
- Dade County (north)
- Greene County (northeast)
- Christian County (southeast)
- Stone County (southeast)
- Barry County (south)
- Newton County (southwest)
- Jasper County (west)

=== Major highways ===
- I-44
  - I-44 BL (Mount Vernon)
- US 60
- Route 96
- Route 97
- Route 266 – former US 66

== Demographics ==
Historical population
| Census | Pop. | Note | %± |
|---|---|---|---|
| 1850 | 4,859 | | — |
| 1860 | 8,840 | | 81.9% |
| 1870 | 12,977 | | 46.8% |
| 1880 | 17,583 | | 35.5% |
| 1890 | 26,228 | | 49.2% |
| 1900 | 31,662 | | 20.7% |
| 1910 | 26,583 | | −16.0% |
| 1920 | 24,211 | | −8.9% |
| 1930 | 23,774 | | −1.8% |
| 1940 | 24,637 | | 3.6% |
| 1950 | 23,420 | | −4.9% |
| 1960 | 23,260 | | −0.7% |
| 1970 | 24,585 | | 5.7% |
| 1980 | 28,973 | | 17.8% |
| 1990 | 30,236 | | 4.4% |
| 2000 | 35,204 | | 16.4% |
| 2010 | 38,634 | | 9.7% |
| 2020 | 38,001 | | −1.6% |
| 2025 (est.) | 39,401 | ▲ | 3.7% |
U.S. Decennial Census; 1790-1960 1900-1990; 1990-2000 2010

=== Racial and ethnic composition ===
Lawrence County, Missouri – Racial and ethnic composition Note: the US Census treats Hispanic/Latino as an ethnic category. This table excludes Latinos from the racial categories and assigns them to a separate category. Hispanics/Latinos may be of any race.
| Race / Ethnicity (NH = Non-Hispanic) | Pop 1980 | Pop 1990 | Pop 2000 | Pop 2010 | Pop 2020 | % 1980 | % 1990 | % 2000 | % 2010 | % 2020 |
|---|---|---|---|---|---|---|---|---|---|---|
| White alone (NH) | 28,617 | 29,667 | 33,213 | 35,140 | 32,401 | 98.77% | 98.12% | 94.34% | 90.96% | 85.26% |
| Black or African American alone (NH) | 9 | 24 | 68 | 83 | 134 | 0.03% | 0.08% | 0.19% | 0.21% | 0.35% |
| Native American or Alaska Native alone (NH) | 103 | 271 | 252 | 301 | 333 | 0.36% | 0.90% | 0.72% | 0.78% | 0.88% |
| Asian alone (NH) | 58 | 56 | 79 | 124 | 171 | 0.20% | 0.19% | 0.22% | 0.32% | 0.45% |
| Native Hawaiian or Pacific Islander alone (NH) | x | x | 7 | 10 | 40 | x | x | 0.02% | 0.03% | 0.11% |
| Other race alone (NH) | 22 | 7 | 13 | 11 | 91 | 0.08% | 0.02% | 0.04% | 0.03% | 0.24% |
| Mixed race or Multiracial (NH) | x | x | 377 | 521 | 1,844 | x | x | 1.07% | 1.35% | 4.85% |
| Hispanic or Latino (any race) | 164 | 211 | 1,195 | 2,444 | 2,987 | 0.57% | 0.70% | 3.39% | 6.33% | 7.86% |
| Total | 28,973 | 30,236 | 35,204 | 38,634 | 38,001 | 100.00% | 100.00% | 100.00% | 100.00% | 100.00% |

=== 2020 census ===
As of the 2020 census, the county had a population of 38,001, and the median age was 40.0 years. 25.2% of residents were under the age of 18 and 19.0% of residents were 65 years of age or older. For every 100 females there were 99.6 males, and for every 100 females age 18 and over there were 96.4 males age 18 and over.

There were 14,599 households in the county, of which 31.2% had children under the age of 18 living with them and 23.7% had a female householder with no spouse or partner present. About 26.5% of all households were made up of individuals and 12.9% had someone living alone who was 65 years of age or older.

There were 16,219 housing units, of which 10.0% were vacant. Among occupied housing units, 71.6% were owner-occupied and 28.4% were renter-occupied. The homeowner vacancy rate was 2.4% and the rental vacancy rate was 8.4%.

28.5% of residents lived in urban areas, while 71.5% lived in rural areas.

The racial makeup (allocating Hispanics to the various racial categories) of the county was 87.2% White, 0.4% Black or African American, 1.1% American Indian and Alaska Native, 0.5% Asian, 0.1% Native Hawaiian and Pacific Islander, 3.6% from some other race, and 7.2% from two or more races, with 7.9% of the population identifying as Hispanic or Latino of any race.

Lawrence County Racial Composition
| Race | Num. | Perc. |
|---|---|---|
| White (NH) | 32,401 | 85.26% |
| Black or African American (NH) | 134 | 0.35% |
| Native American (NH) | 333 | 0.9% |
| Asian (NH) | 171 | 0.45% |
| Pacific Islander (NH) | 40 | 0.11% |
| Other/Mixed (NH) | 1,935 | 5.1% |
| Hispanic or Latino | 2,987 | 7.86% |

=== 2000 census ===
As of the 2000 census of 2000, there were 35,204 people, 13,568 households, and 9,728 families residing in the county. The population density was 57 people per square mile (22 people/km^{2}). There were 14,789 housing units at an average density of 24 units per square mile (9.3/km^{2}). The racial makeup of the county was 95.68% White, 0.27% Black or African American, 0.76% Native American, 0.22% Asian, 0.02% Pacific Islander, 1.67% from other races, and 1.37% from two or more races. Approximately 3.39% of the population were Hispanic or Latino of any race.

There were 13,568 households, out of which 33.60% had children under the age of 18 living with them, 58.90% were married couples living together, 9.00% had a female householder with no husband present, and 28.30% were non-families. 24.50% of all households were made up of individuals, and 11.90% had someone living alone who was 65 years of age or older. The average household size was 2.55 and the average family size was 3.03.

In the county, the population was spread out, with 27.20% under the age of 18, 7.90% from 18 to 24, 26.90% from 25 to 44, 22.40% from 45 to 64, and 15.60% who were 65 years of age or older. The median age was 37 years. For every 100 females there were 97.00 males. For every 100 females age 18 and over, there were 92.10 males.

The median income for a household in the county was $31,239, and the median income for a family was $36,846. Males had a median income of $27,309 versus $18,990 for females. The per capita income for the county was $15,399. About 11.00% of families and 14.10% of the population were below the poverty line, including 19.50% of those under age 18 and 11.80% of those age 65 or over.

== Education ==
Public schools include Pierce City High School.

== Communities ==
=== Cities ===
- Aurora
- Marionville
- Miller
- Monett
- Mount Vernon (county seat)
- Pierce City
- Stotts City
- Verona

=== Villages ===
- Freistatt
- Halltown
- Hoberg

=== Census-designated place ===
- Chesapeake

=== Other unincorporated places ===
- Albatross
- Bowers Mill
- Clarkson
- Elliott
- Grays Point
- Heatonville
- Lawrenceburg
- Logan
- McKinley
- Minden
- Olinger
- Opal
- Orange
- Paris Springs Junction
- Phelps
- Plew
- Red Oak
- Rescue
- Round Grove
- Spencer
- Stinson

== Politics ==
=== Local ===
The Republican Party completely controls politics at the local level in Lawrence County. Republicans hold all elected positions in the county.

Lawrence County, Missouri

Elected countywide officials
| Assessor | Doug Bowerman | Republican |
| Circuit Clerk | Steven W. Kahre | Republican |
| County Clerk | Gary Emerson | Republican |
| Collector | Kelli McVey | Republican |
| Commissioner (presiding) | Sam Goodman | Republican |
| Commissioner (district 1) | Joe Ruscha | Republican |
| Commissioner (district 2) | Rodney Barnes | Republican |
| Coroner | Scott Lakin | Republican |
| Prosecuting Attorney | Darlene Parrigon | Republican |
| Public Administrator | Pam Fobair | Republican |
| Recorder | Pam Robertson | Republican |
| Sheriff | Brad DeLay | Republican |
| Surveyor | Aaron Austin | Republican |
| Treasurer | Kathy Fairchild | Republican |

=== State ===
Past Gubernatorial Elections Results
| Year | Republican | Democratic | Third Parties |
|---|---|---|---|
| 2024 | 79.21% 14,345 | 18.77% 3,399 | 2.02% 365 |
| 2020 | 79.58% 14,176 | 17.88% 3,185 | 2.54% 452 |
| 2016 | 69.34% 11,565 | 26.87% 4,482 | 3.79% 632 |
| 2012 | 57.51% 9,022 | 39.91% 6,261 | 2.58% 405 |
| 2008 | 49.15% 8,118 | 47.94% 7,918 | 2.91% 482 |
| 2004 | 70.22% 11,069 | 28.55% 4,500 | 1.23% 194 |
| 2000 | 58.24% 7,447 | 39.93% 5,106 | 1.82% 233 |
| 1996 | 54.20% 6,695 | 42.13% 5,204 | 3.68% 454 |

Lawrence County is divided into two legislative districts in the Missouri House of Representatives, both of which are held by Republicans.

- District 157 — Mike Moon (R-Ash Grove). Consists of most of the entire county.

Missouri House of Representatives — District 157 — Lawrence County (2016)
| Party | Candidate | Votes | % | ±% |
|---|---|---|---|---|
| Republican | Mike Moon | 11,632 | 74.17% | −1.94 |
| Independent | Stephanie Davis | 4,050 | 25.83% | +25.83 |

Missouri House of Representatives — District 157 — Lawrence County (2014)
| Party | Candidate | Votes | % | ±% |
|---|---|---|---|---|
| Republican | Mike Moon | 6,407 | 76.11% | −23.89 |
| Democratic | Vince Jennings | 2,011 | 23.89% | +23.89 |

Missouri House of Representatives — District 157 — Lawrence County (2012)
| Party | Candidate | Votes | % | ±% |
|---|---|---|---|---|
| Republican | Don Ruzicka | 13,426 | 100.00% | |

- District 158 — Scott Fitzpatrick (R-Shell Knob). Consists of a part of the southwest corner of the county, including about half of Pierce City.

Missouri House of Representatives — District 158 — Lawrence County (2016)
| Party | Candidate | Votes | % | ±% |
|---|---|---|---|---|
| Republican | Scott Fitzpatrick | 434 | 100.00% | |

Missouri House of Representatives — District 158 — Lawrence County (2014)
| Party | Candidate | Votes | % | ±% |
|---|---|---|---|---|
| Republican | Scott Fitzpatrick | 246 | 100.00% | +16.55 |

Missouri House of Representatives — District 158 — Lawrence County (2012)
| Party | Candidate | Votes | % | ±% |
|---|---|---|---|---|
| Republican | Scott Fitzpatrick | 373 | 83.45% | |
| Constitution | Sue Beck | 74 | 16.55% | |

All of Lawrence County is a part of Missouri's 29th District in the Missouri Senate and is currently represented by David Sater (R-Cassville.

Missouri Senate — District 29 — Lawrence County (2016)
| Party | Candidate | Votes | % | ±% |
|---|---|---|---|---|
| Republican | David Sater | 14,298 | 100.00% | |

Missouri Senate — District 29 — Lawrence County (2012)
| Party | Candidate | Votes | % | ±% |
|---|---|---|---|---|
| Republican | David Sater | 13,580 | 100.00% | |

=== Federal ===
U.S. Senate — Missouri — Lawrence County (2016)
| Party | Candidate | Votes | % | ±% |
|---|---|---|---|---|
| Republican | Roy Blunt | 11,525 | 69.04% | +14.46 |
| Democratic | Jason Kander | 4,336 | 25.98% | −11.41 |
| Libertarian | Jonathan Dine | 440 | 2.64% | −5.39 |
| Green | Johnathan McFarland | 192 | 1.15% | +1.15 |
| Constitution | Fred Ryman | 199 | 1.19% | +1.19 |

U.S. Senate — Missouri — Lawrence County (2012)
| Party | Candidate | Votes | % | ±% |
|---|---|---|---|---|
| Republican | Todd Akin | 8,510 | 54.58% | |
| Democratic | Claire McCaskill | 5,830 | 37.39% | |
| Libertarian | Jonathan Dine | 1,252 | 8.03% | |

All of Lawrence County is included in Missouri's 7th Congressional District and is currently represented by Billy Long (R-Springfield) in the U.S. House of Representatives.

U.S. House of Representatives — Missouri's 7th Congressional District — Lawrence County (2016)
| Party | Candidate | Votes | % | ±% |
|---|---|---|---|---|
| Republican | Billy Long | 11,622 | 70.77% | +12.23 |
| Democratic | Genevieve Williams | 3,813 | 23.22% | −6.55 |
| Libertarian | Benjamin T. Brixey | 987 | 6.01% | −5.68 |

U.S. House of Representatives — Missouri's 7th Congressional District — Lawrence County (2014)
| Party | Candidate | Votes | % | ±% |
|---|---|---|---|---|
| Republican | Billy Long | 5,078 | 58.54% | −6.22 |
| Democratic | Jim Evans | 2,583 | 29.77% | +1.17 |
| Libertarian | Kevin Craig | 1,014 | 11.69% | +5.05 |

U.S. House of Representatives — Missouri’s 7th Congressional District — Lawrence County (2012)
| Party | Candidate | Votes | % | ±% |
|---|---|---|---|---|
| Republican | Billy Long | 9,956 | 64.76% | |
| Democratic | Jim Evans | 4,397 | 28.60% | |
| Libertarian | Kevin Craig | 1,020 | 6.64% | |

==== Political culture ====
United States presidential election results for Lawrence County, Missouri
| Year | Republican | | Democratic | | Third party(ies) | |
| Year | No. | % | No. | % | No. | % |
|---|---|---|---|---|---|---|
| 1888 | 2,460 | 47.46% | 2,181 | 42.08% | 542 | 10.46% |
| 1892 | 2,623 | 44.44% | 2,428 | 41.14% | 851 | 14.42% |
| 1896 | 2,962 | 46.46% | 3,369 | 52.85% | 44 | 0.69% |
| 1900 | 3,552 | 50.44% | 3,313 | 47.05% | 177 | 2.51% |
| 1904 | 3,077 | 52.55% | 2,372 | 40.51% | 406 | 6.93% |
| 1908 | 3,028 | 50.87% | 2,532 | 42.54% | 392 | 6.59% |
| 1912 | 1,312 | 23.36% | 2,384 | 42.45% | 1,920 | 34.19% |
| 1916 | 3,228 | 50.83% | 2,809 | 44.24% | 313 | 4.93% |
| 1920 | 6,093 | 61.33% | 3,532 | 35.55% | 310 | 3.12% |
| 1924 | 4,499 | 49.35% | 3,768 | 41.33% | 849 | 9.31% |
| 1928 | 6,328 | 63.17% | 3,646 | 36.40% | 43 | 0.43% |
| 1932 | 4,146 | 38.63% | 6,411 | 59.74% | 175 | 1.63% |
| 1936 | 6,185 | 49.72% | 6,184 | 49.71% | 70 | 0.56% |
| 1940 | 7,317 | 57.88% | 5,279 | 41.76% | 45 | 0.36% |
| 1944 | 6,836 | 63.76% | 3,859 | 35.99% | 27 | 0.25% |
| 1948 | 5,392 | 53.61% | 4,649 | 46.22% | 17 | 0.17% |
| 1952 | 8,029 | 65.30% | 4,232 | 34.42% | 34 | 0.28% |
| 1956 | 7,372 | 60.62% | 4,789 | 39.38% | 0 | 0.00% |
| 1960 | 8,406 | 65.22% | 4,483 | 34.78% | 0 | 0.00% |
| 1964 | 6,047 | 48.65% | 6,383 | 51.35% | 0 | 0.00% |
| 1968 | 6,834 | 59.73% | 3,710 | 32.42% | 898 | 7.85% |
| 1972 | 8,445 | 72.96% | 3,130 | 27.04% | 0 | 0.00% |
| 1976 | 5,784 | 51.93% | 5,315 | 47.72% | 38 | 0.34% |
| 1980 | 7,921 | 61.68% | 4,670 | 36.36% | 252 | 1.96% |
| 1984 | 8,370 | 69.23% | 3,720 | 30.77% | 0 | 0.00% |
| 1988 | 6,911 | 60.73% | 4,432 | 38.95% | 36 | 0.32% |
| 1992 | 5,608 | 43.50% | 4,666 | 36.20% | 2,617 | 20.30% |
| 1996 | 6,099 | 49.46% | 4,465 | 36.21% | 1,768 | 14.34% |
| 2000 | 8,305 | 64.36% | 4,235 | 32.82% | 363 | 2.81% |
| 2004 | 11,194 | 70.82% | 4,506 | 28.51% | 106 | 0.67% |
| 2008 | 11,263 | 67.50% | 5,097 | 30.55% | 325 | 1.95% |
| 2012 | 11,421 | 72.49% | 4,017 | 25.50% | 317 | 2.01% |
| 2016 | 13,089 | 77.86% | 2,901 | 17.26% | 821 | 4.88% |
| 2020 | 14,426 | 80.57% | 3,214 | 17.95% | 265 | 1.48% |
| 2024 | 15,001 | 81.41% | 3,248 | 17.63% | 178 | 0.97% |

=== Missouri presidential preference primary (2008) ===
Voters in Lawrence County from both political parties supported candidates who finished in second place in the state at large and nationally. Former Governor Mike Huckabee (R-Arkansas) received more votes, a total of 2,628, than any candidate from either party in Lawrence County during the 2008 presidential primary.

== See also ==
- List of counties in Missouri
- National Register of Historic Places listings in Lawrence County, Missouri
