= Mount Vernon, Missouri =

City in Missouri, U.S.

- City
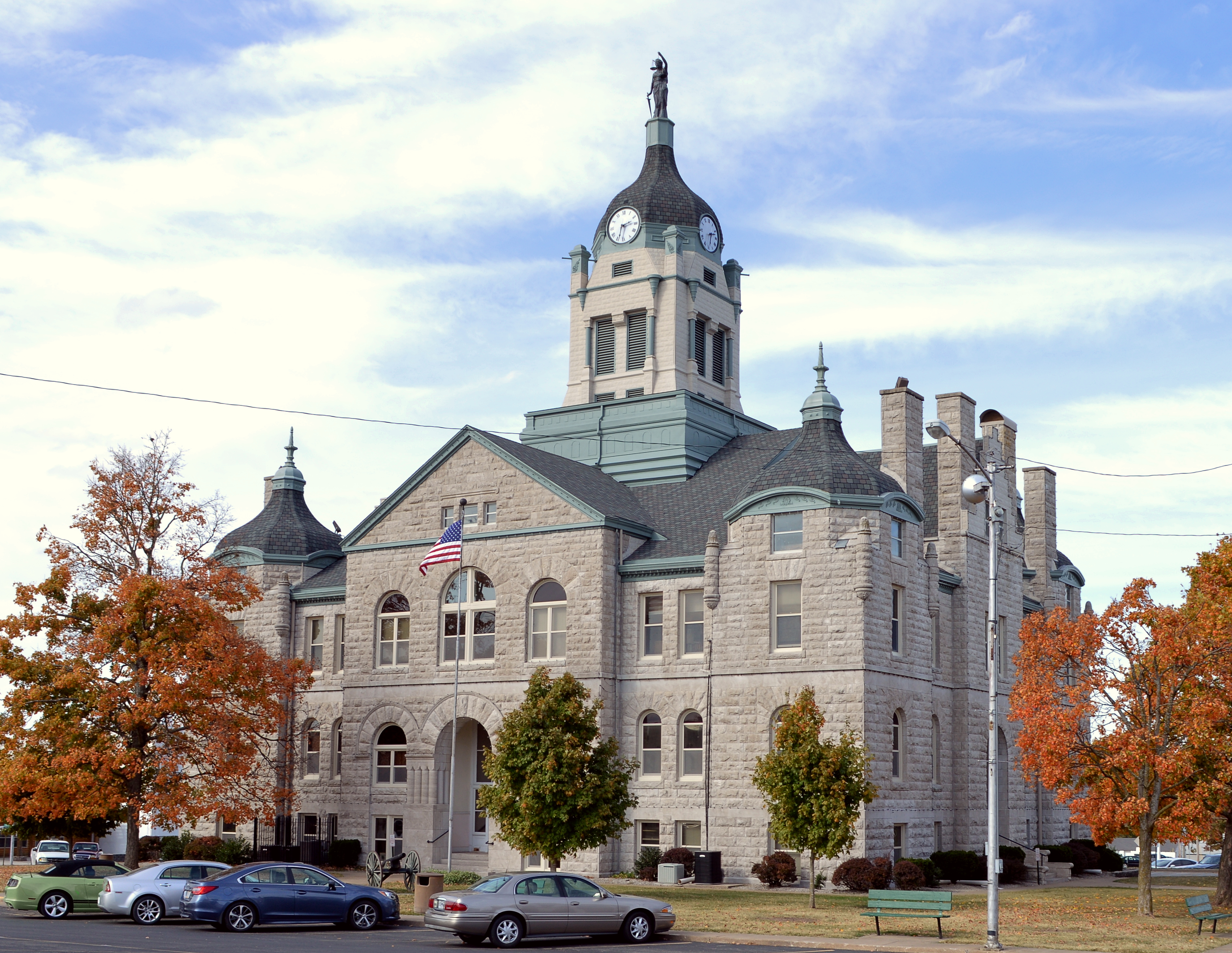
- Lawrence County Courthouse, October 2015

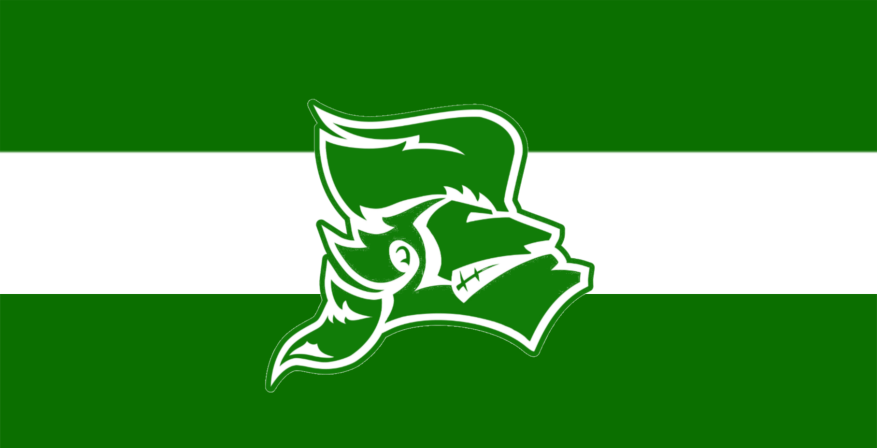
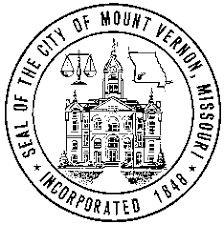
- Flag Seal
- Nickname: “Home of Apple Butter Makin’ Days”
- Motto: “Progress You Can See”
- Location of Mount Vernon, Missouri
- Coordinates: 37°6′0″N 93°49′5″W
- Country: United States
- State: Missouri
- County: Lawrence

Government
  - Type: Mayor/Council
  - Mayor: David Eden

Area
  - Total: 4.10 sq mi (10.62 km^{2})
  - Land: 4.10 sq mi (10.62 km^{2})
  - Water: 0 sq mi (0.00 km^{2})
- Elevation: 1,211 ft (369 m)

Population (2020)
  - Total: 4,526
  - Estimate (2024): 4,703
  - Density: 1,104/sq mi (426.2/km^{2})
- Time zone: UTC-6 (Central (CST))
  - Summer (DST): UTC-5 (CDT)
- ZIP code: 65712
- Area code: 417
- FIPS code: 29-50672
- GNIS feature ID: 0722909
- Website: mtvernon-cityhall.org

Mount Vernon is a city in and the county seat of Lawrence County, Missouri, United States. As of the 2020 census, its population was 4,526. Mount Vernon is located halfway between Springfield and Joplin along I-44.

== History ==
Mount Vernon was platted in 1845. The city was named after Mount Vernon, the estate of George Washington. A post office called Mount Vernon has been in operation since 1846.

== Geography ==
According to the United States Census Bureau, the city has a total area of 3.87 square miles (10.02 km^{2}), all land.

== Demographics ==
Historical population
Census	Pop.	Note	%±
1860	441		—
1870	558		26.5%
1880	527		−5.6%
1890	782		48.4%
1900	1,206		54.2%
1910	1,161		−3.7%
1920	1,254		8.0%
1930	1,342		7.0%
1940	1,982		47.7%
1950	2,057		3.8%
1960	2,381		15.8%
1970	2,600		9.2%
1980	3,341		28.5%
1990	3,726		11.5%
2000	4,017		7.8%
2010	4,575		13.9%
2020	4,526		−1.1%
U.S. Decennial Census

=== 2020 census ===
As of the 2020 census, Mount Vernon had a population of 4,526. The median age was 39.5 years. 23.3% of residents were under the age of 18 and 22.2% of residents were 65 years of age or older. For every 100 females there were 99.9 males, and for every 100 females age 18 and over there were 97.9 males age 18 and over.

0.0% of residents lived in urban areas, while 100.0% lived in rural areas.

There were 1,753 households in Mount Vernon, of which 30.8% had children under the age of 18 living in them. Of all households, 43.4% were married-couple households, 16.4% were households with a male householder and no spouse or partner present, and 32.8% were households with a female householder and no spouse or partner present. About 31.5% of all households were made up of individuals and 14.5% had someone living alone who was 65 years of age or older.

There were 1,951 housing units, of which 10.1% were vacant. The homeowner vacancy rate was 3.6% and the rental vacancy rate was 9.4%.

Racial composition as of the 2020 census
Race	Number	Percent
White	4,104	90.7%
Black or African American	23	0.5%
American Indian and Alaska Native	51	1.1%
Asian	18	0.4%
Native Hawaiian and Other Pacific Islander	0	0.0%
Some other race	29	0.6%
Two or more races	301	6.7%
Hispanic or Latino (of any race)	122	2.7%

=== 2010 census ===
As of the census of 2010, there were 4,575 people, 1,810 households, and 1,101 families living in the city. The population density was 1,182.2 inhabitants per square mile (456.4/km^{2}). There were 2,013 housing units at an average density of 520.2 per square mile (200.9/km^{2}). The racial makeup of the city was 95.3% White, 0.4% African American, 1.3% Native American, 0.5% Asian, 0.6% from other races, and 1.9% from two or more races. Hispanic or Latino of any race were 2.1% of the population.

There were 1,810 households, of which 31.3% had children under the age of 18 living with them, 42.5% were married couples living together, 14.3% had a female householder with no husband present, 4.0% had a male householder with no wife present, and 39.2% were non-families. 34.8% of all households were made up of individuals, and 16.6% had someone living alone who was 65 years of age or older. The average household size was 2.31 and the average family size was 2.96.

The median age in the city was 40.3 years. 24.1% of residents were under the age of 18; 7.4% were between the ages of 18 and 24; 23.1% were from 25 to 44; 23.6% were from 45 to 64; and 21.7% were 65 years of age or older. The gender makeup of the city was 48.6% male and 51.4% female.

=== 2000 census ===
As of the census of 2000, there were 4,017 people, 1,606 households, and 1,005 families living in the city. The population density was 1,173.4 inhabitants per square mile (453.1/km^{2}). There were 1,730 housing units at an average density of 505.3 per square mile (195.1/km^{2}). The racial makeup of the city was 96.61% White, 0.67% African American, 0.92% Native American, 0.27% Asian, 0.55% from other races, and 0.97% from two or more races. Hispanic or Latino of any race were 1.22% of the population.

There were 1,606 households, out of which 28.1% had children under the age of 18 living with them, 46.9% were married couples living together, 12.4% had a female householder with no husband present, and 37.4% were non-families. 33.8% of all households were made up of individuals, and 16.3% had someone living alone who was 65 years of age or older. The average household size was 2.27 and the average family size was 2.89.

In the city, the population was spread out, with 23.3% under the age of 18, 8.6% from 18 to 24, 23.4% from 25 to 44, 21.7% from 45 to 64, and 23.0% who were 65 years of age or older. The median age was 41 years. For every 100 females, there were 92.9 males. For every 100 females age 18 and over, there were 86.2 males.

The median income for a household in the city was $28,628, and the median income for a family was $34,848. Males had a median income of $27,665 versus $20,234 for females. The per capita income for the city was $16,210. About 10.5% of families and 13.7% of the population were below the poverty line, including 24.0% of those under age 18 and 11.2% of those age 65 or over.

== Arts and culture ==
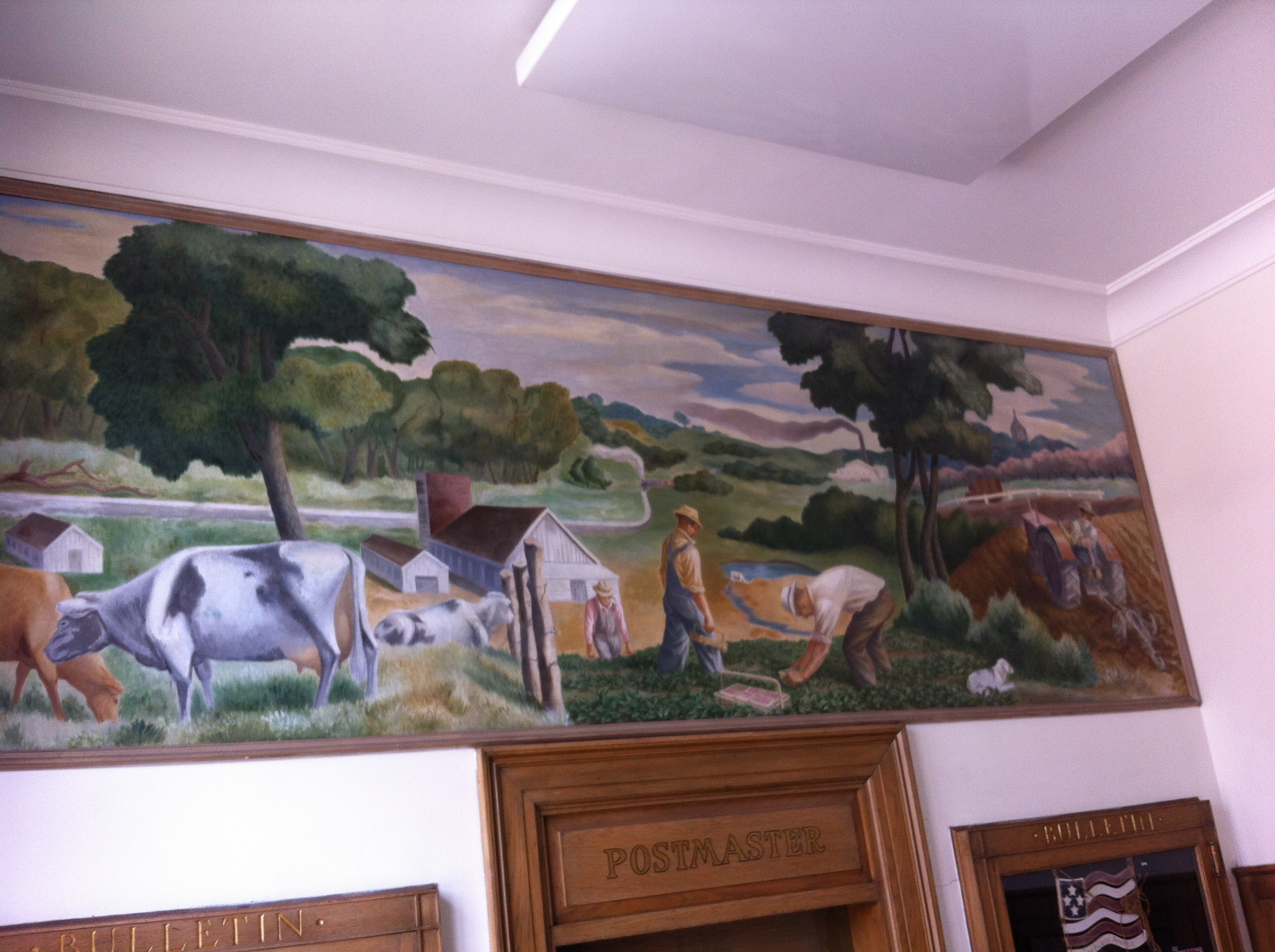
Mural in Mount Vernon post office

Lawrence County Courthouse and Old Spanish Fort Archeological Site are listed on the National Register of Historic Places.

Mount Vernon has a public library, a branch of the Barry-Lawrence Regional Library.

== Education ==
Mt. Vernon R-V School District operates one early learning center, elementary school, one intermediate school, one middle school, and Mt. Vernon High School.

== Notable people ==
- Charles D. Barger, WWI Private First Class, Decorated war hero, Medal of Honor recipient
- Bobby Berk, interior design expert, Queer Eye
- Julia Butterfly Hill, environmental activist
- Joe J. Manlove, U.S. Representative from Missouri
- Isaac V. McPherson, U.S. Representative from Missouri

== See also ==
- List of cities in Missouri
