= Little Beaver Creek (Missouri) =

Stream in southern Missouri

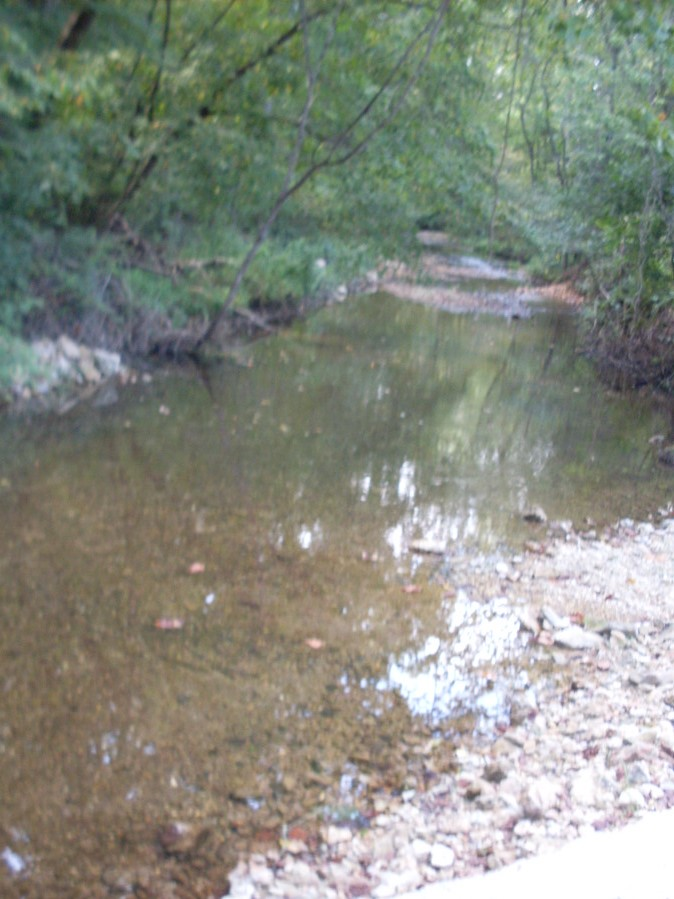
- Little Beaver Creek crossing near its headwaters in western Douglas County, Missouri

Location
- Country: United States
- State: Missouri
- Region: Douglas, Taney and Christian counties

Physical characteristics
- Source
  - coordinates: 37°00′32″N 92°49′42″W
  - elevation: 1,490 ft (450 m)
- Mouth
  - coordinates: 36°47′21″N 92°54′13″W
  - elevation: 814 ft (248 m)

Little Beaver Creek is a stream in Douglas, Christian and Taney counties of southern Missouri.

The stream headwaters arise in northwestern Douglas County on the east flank of Keyger Mountain just west of Missouri Route AK to the northwest of Arden and south of Dogwood and about nine miles west-northwest of Ava. The stream flows south to southwest through western Douglas County. It is bridged by Missouri Route T just east of Merritt and Route DD west of Cross Roads. The stream then enters the Mark Twain National Forest. In the southwest corner of Douglas County the stream meanders for a short span into and out of southeast Christian County, back into Douglas and immediately south into Taney County. In northern Taney County the stream runs parallel to Missouri Route 125 for about one mile before joining Beaver Creek just northeast of Bradleyville. The stream source is at an elevation of approximately 1490 feet and the elevation of the confluence is 814 feet.
