= Colton Greene =

Confederate cavalry officer

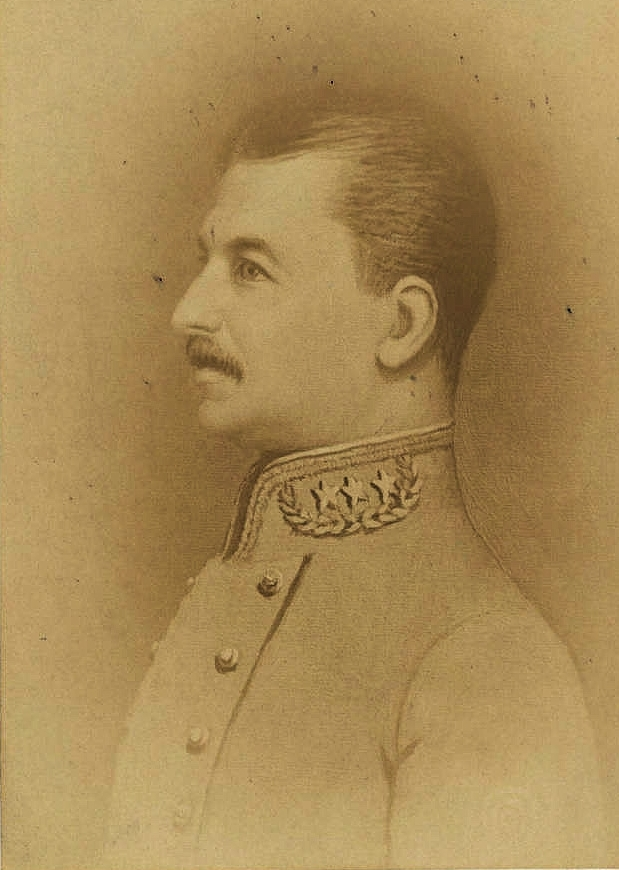
- Greene in uniform, c. 1862
- Born: July 7, 1833; South Carolina, U.S.
- Died: September 23, 1900 (aged 67); Memphis, Tennessee, U.S.
- Burial place: Elmwood Cemetery, Memphis, Tennessee, U.S.
- Military career
- Allegiance: Confederate States
- Branch: Missouri State Guard; Confederate States Army
- Service years: 1862-1865
- Rank: Brigadier-General (Mo.); Colonel (C.S.)
- Conflicts: American Civil War

Colton Greene (July 7, 1833 – September 23, 1900) was an officer of the Confederate States Army who commanded cavalry in the Trans-Mississippi Theater of the American Civil War. After the Civil War Greene pursued several successful civic projects and public functions in Memphis, Tennessee.

== Early life ==
Greene was born July 7, 1833, in South Carolina, according to his postwar application for a passport. Little is known of his parents or education, and he reportedly never married nor would discuss his past with anyone. One story, current in Memphis at the time, was that he killed a man in a duel in South Carolina, and then came west. By 1857 he was living in St. Louis, Missouri, where he was involved in politics with the state's Democratic Party. Greene was a wealthy and successful wholesale grocer in St. Louis by 1860. Also that year Greene became a partner in the St. Louis firm of Hoyt & Co.

== American Civil War ==
Choosing to support the Confederacy, Greene was active in the pro-secession movement in the border state of Missouri just before the war began. He was assigned as an aide-de-camp to Governor Claiborne Fox Jackson in 1861, and helped him to coordinate the activities of the secessionists.

Greene was appointed a captain in the Missouri State Guard in 1861, and was sent by Jackson along with Capt. Basil W. Duke to Montgomery, Alabama, (then capital of the Confederacy) to ask the recently elected Confederate President Jefferson Davis for artillery. It was hoped this could be used to attack the Federal arsenal in St. Louis, however the captains arrived with their artillery too late to help in the effort, and the cannon were captured by Union troops. Despite this setback, Greene soon afterwards aided Gov. Jackson to drill recruits that had gathered in Jefferson City, as well as missions that summer into Arkansas and to Richmond, Virginia, to seek support for invading and reclaiming Missouri, now increasingly under Union control.

On August 10, 1861, Greene saw his first combat on the staff of Brig. Gen. James H. McBride during the Battle of Wilson's Creek, near Springfield, Missouri. On October 28, Greene was appointed colonel in the Missouri State Guard and assigned as assistant adjutant to the Confederate 7th District in Missouri, commanded by McBride. When that commander fell ill in early 1862, Greene was ordered to lead the district, which he re-organized into a brigade consisting of two volunteer regiments. His brigade participated in the Confederate defeat during the Battle of Pea Ridge on March 7–8 near Bentonville, Arkansas. In the battle, Greene's command was part of Maj. Gen. Sterling Price's Division in Maj. Gen. Earl Van Dorn's army. Sometime during 1861, Greene was also appointed a brigadier general in the Missouri State Guard.

After the fight at Pea Ridge, Greene accompanied Price's force into Mississippi that spring. He requested and received permission to re-enter Missouri to gather recruits, and by the fall he had collected and trained a mounted force. Named the 3rd Missouri Cavalry, Greene was appointed its colonel in the regular Confederate Army on November 4, 1862. Greene led the 3rd Missouri (part of Gen. John S. Marmaduke's division of the Army of the West) at the Battle of Clark's Mill on November 7 at Vera Cruz, located about ten miles southeast of Ava in Douglas County, Missouri.

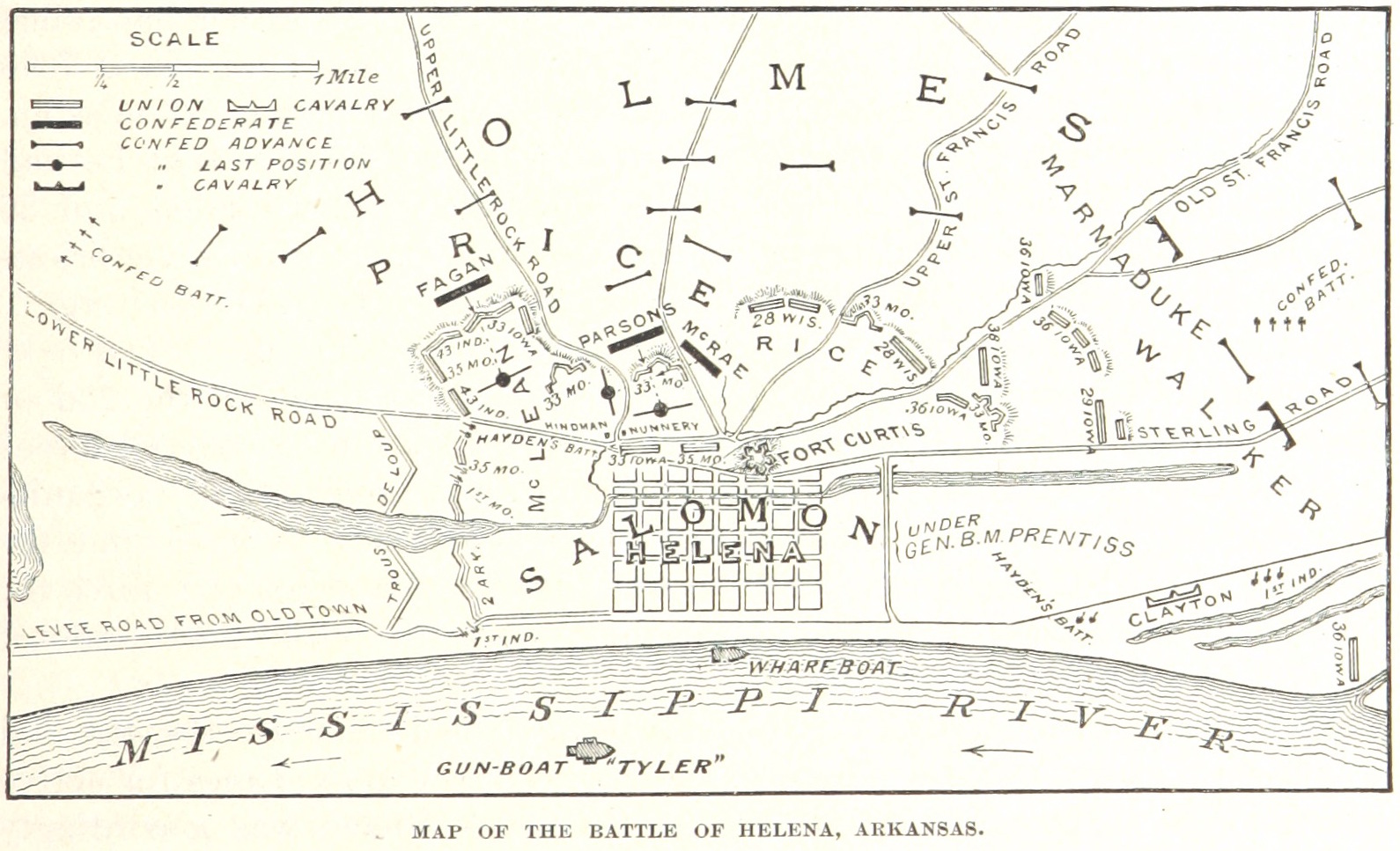
Postbellum map of the Battle of Helena, Arkansas

In 1863, Greene led Marmaduke's cavalry brigade at the Battle of Helena in Phillips County, Arkansas, on July 4. Green then participated during the battles of the 1864 Red River Campaign in the Trans-Mississippi Theater. He fought in the Camden Expedition and the Battle of Poison Spring around Lee Plantation, about 10 miles from Camden, Arkansas, on April 18, 1864. His command was in reserve in the action and entered a hole in the Confederate line that was caused by Union artillery fire. Greene plugged that hole and sealed the victory, routing the remaining Union defensive line. This fight is noted for accusations of the murdering of wounded Federal United States Colored Troops as they surrendered, left behind when the Union forces retreated.

Greene led his brigade (part of Marmaduke's Division in Edmund Kirby Smith's Army of Arkansas) during the Battle of Jenkins' Ferry in Grant County, Arkansas, on April 30, 1864. In the Confederate loss, Greene reported a casualty total of 50; seven dead and 43 wounded. During the time Green was leading a brigade in 1864 he was an acting brigadier general in the Confederate States Army.

On June 6, 1864, Greene fought during the Battle of Old River Lake in Chicot County, Arkansas. At Ditch Bayou Greene attempted unsuccessfully to delay Union forces that were approaching Lake Village, and then he withdrew to nearby Parker's Landing. Total Confederate casualties in the loss, including Greene's soldiers, was reportedly 100 men. Later that summer Greene was arrested and charged with disobeying orders, accused of failing to surrender his mules to the Confederate government. In the ensuing court-martial that fall, he was exonerated of the charges and returned to his command. After the trial, Greene fought during Sterling Price's unsuccessful 1864 Missouri Expedition, better known as Price's Raid. Marmaduke had been promoted and his brigade went to Brig. Gen. John B. Clark, leaving Greene to lead the 3rd Missouri Cavalry once more. When Clark was given divisional command after the raid, Greene again led a brigade.

== Later life ==
When the war ended in 1865, Green returned to his life in St. Louis. There he found that his former partner, Stephen Hoyt, and others had seized his business interests and property, leaving Greene in poverty. He then moved to Memphis, Tennessee, to rebuild, taking up work as a banker and an insurance agent for the Memphis office of the Knickerbocker Life Insurance Company of New York. Greene established his own insurance firm in 1871 and soon prospered. He then founded the State Savings Bank of Memphis, as well as organizing support in 1886 for the city's first municipal waterworks with the publication of the Report on a Public Water Supply for the City of Memphis, February 23, 1886, which he edited. Greene arranged the first Memphis Mardi Gras (described as "highly successful") and also helped found the Memphis Public Library.

== Death ==
Greene died on September 23, 1900, and was buried in Greene is buried in Memphis’s Elmwood Cemetery.

== See also ==
- List of Confederate acting generals

== Bibliography ==
- Allardice, Bruce S., Confederate Colonels, University of Missouri Press, 2008.
- Allardice, Bruce S., More Generals in Gray, Louisiana State University Press, 1995, ISBN 0-8071-3148-2.
- Eicher(1), David J., The Longest Night: A Military History of the Civil War, Simon & Schuster, 2001, ISBN 0-684-84944-5.
- Eicher(2), John H., and Eicher, David J., Civil War High Commands, Stanford University Press, 2001, ISBN 978-0-8047-3641-1.
