= Red Bank, Missouri =

Unincorporated community in Missouri, U.S.

Coordinates: 36°56′18″N 92°48′39″W

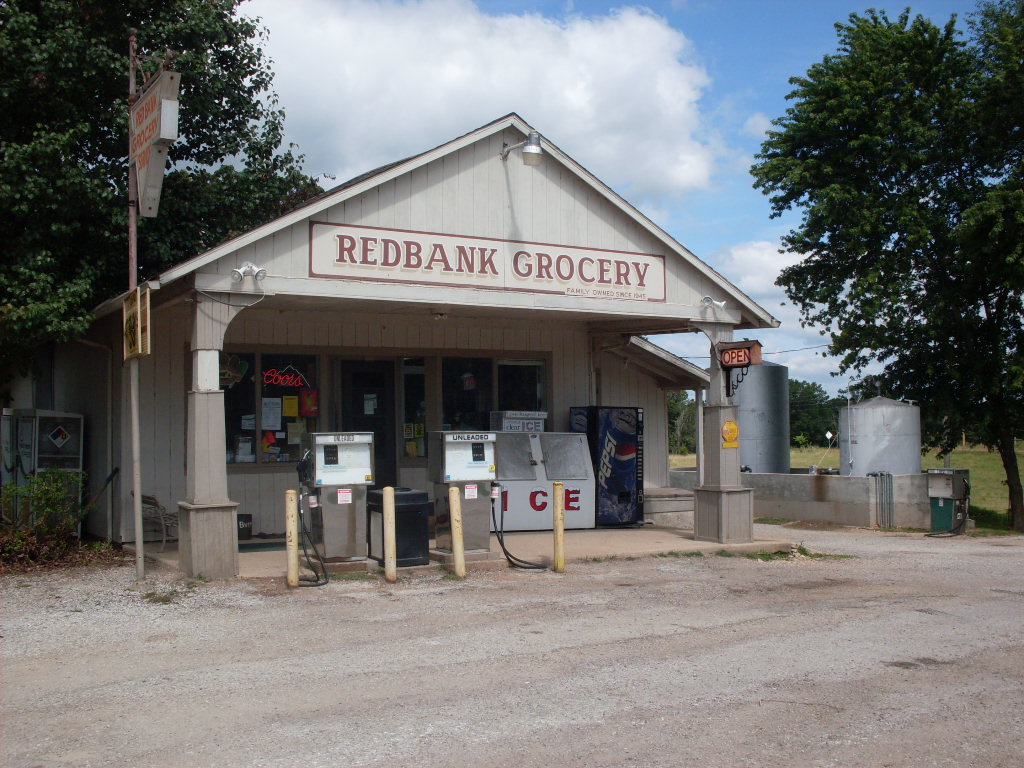
The Red Bank store, a former Conoco gas station.

Redbank (also spelled Red Bank) is an unincorporated community in western Douglas County, Missouri, United States. Redbank is located on Missouri State Route O at its junction with Route NN to the west. The community of Arden is to the north and Goodhope is to the south along Route O and Merritt lies to the southwest along Route T.

== History ==
A post office called Redbank was established in 1891, and remained in operation until 1898. The community was named for the red soil near the original town site.
