= Keyger Mountain =

Mountain ridge in the American state of Missouri

Coordinates: 37°00′24″N 92°49′48″W

Keyger Mountain is an irregular mountain ridge in Douglas and Christian counties in the Ozarks of southern Missouri.

The ridgeline extends from just east of Keltner in Christian County northeast to Tigris Peak along Missouri Route 14 in Douglas County. Several peaks along the ridge exceed 1650 feet with the highest at 1703 feet at the Painter Benchmark along Missouri Route 14 1000 feet west of the Route 14-Missouri Route AK junction. Bounding streams include Little Beaver Creek along the east and southeast; Swan Creek on the northwest; Boulder Fork along the southwest; and tributaries of Beaver Creek along the northeast.

The Keyger Mountain ridgeline is connected to the southern margin of the Springfield Plateau by a narrow ridge between the previously mentioned Painter Benchmark to the community of Dogwood 1.5 miles to the north.
