= Biggs, Missouri =

Unincorporated community in Missouri, U.S.

Coordinates: 36°54′45″N 92°11′30″W

Biggs was an unincorporated community in northeast Douglas County, Missouri, United States.

The community was located above the west bank of the North Fork River just south of the confluence of Indian Creek approximately two miles south of Topaz on County Road E-277. Missouri Route 181 is two miles east along County Road 284. The prominent Round Valley Knob rises approximately 160 feet above the surrounding North Fork floodplain adjacent to the east side of the community site.

The community had a post office from 1894 until 1920 and was named for local mill operator, Monroe Biggs.
