= Basher, Missouri =

Unincorporated community in Missouri, U.S.

Basher
- Unincorporated community
- Location in Missouri##Location in the United States
- Coordinates: 36°59′48″N 92°36′22″W
- Country: United States
- State: Missouri
- County: Douglas
- Named for: Harve Bash

Basher is an unincorporated community in Douglas County, Missouri, United States. Basher is located on a ridge northeast of Ava at the junction of Missouri routes 76 and U at an elevation of 1,342 ft (409 m).

== History ==
A post office called Basher was established in 1907, and remained in operation until 1920. The community was named after Harve Bash, the original owner of the site.
