= Hest =

Hest may refer to:

- Ari Hest (born 1979), American singer-songwriter
- Greg van Hest (born 1973), Dutch runner
- Hest, an album by the Norwegian band Kakkmaddafakka

== See also ==
- Hest Bank, a village in England
- Hest, a community in Missouri, United States.
