= Roy, Missouri =

Unincorporated community in Missouri, U.S.

Coordinates: 36°53′25″N 92°48′14″W

Roy is an unincorporated community in southwestern Douglas County, Missouri, United States. Roy is located on Missouri Route 76, south of the Goodhope junction on Missouri Route T. The village site is at an elevation of 1,263 ft (385 m) about 1.5 mile west of the Beaver Creek valley.

== History ==
A post office called Roy was established in 1882, and remained in operation until 1953. Lafe Roy, an early postmaster and local merchant, gave the community his last name.
