= Depew, Missouri =

Unincorporated community in Missouri, U.S.

Coordinates: 37°01′21″N 92°51′47″W

Depew is an unincorporated community in northwest Douglas County, in the U.S. state of Missouri. The community was located just north of Missouri Route 14, approximately two miles southwest of Dogwood.

== History ==
A post office called Depew was established in 1900, and remained in operation until 1932. The community was named after Chauncey Depew, a United States Senator from New York.
