= Indian Creek (North Fork River tributary) =

Stream in the American state of Missouri

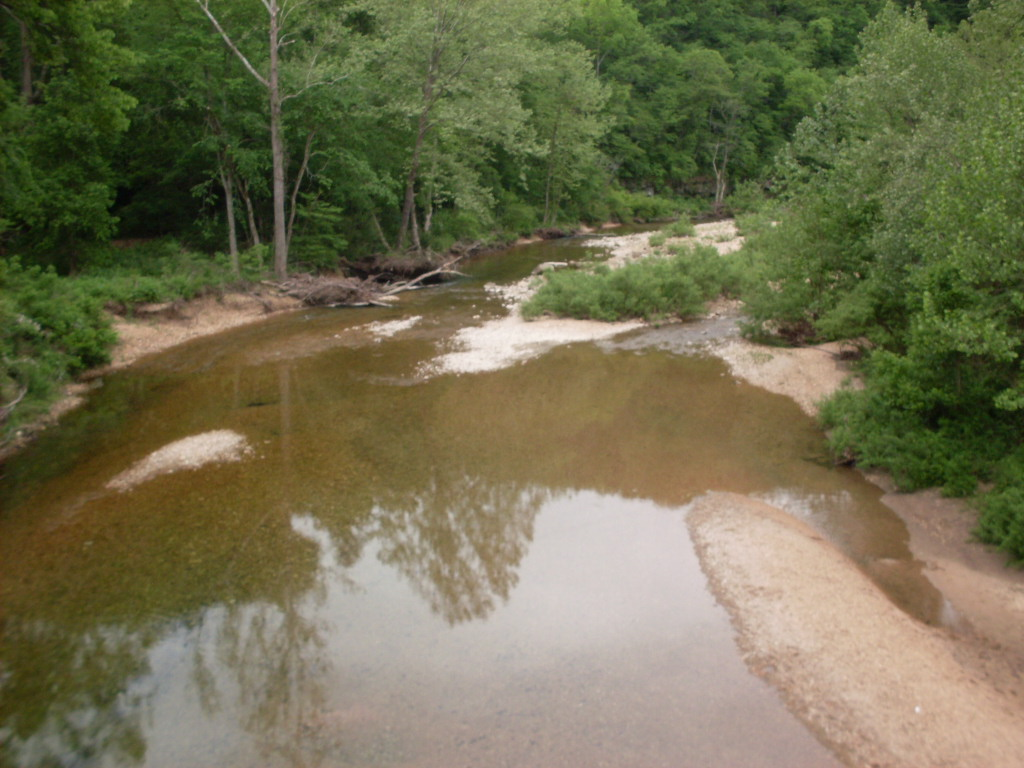
- Indian Creek from the Missouri Route 181 bridge

Location
- Country: United States
- State: Missouri
- Region: Douglas County and Howell County

Physical characteristics
- Source
  - coordinates: 37°02′01″N 92°00′09″W
  - elevation: 1,400 ft (430 m)
- Mouth
  - coordinates: 36°54′58″N 92°11′16″W
  - elevation: 817 ft (249 m)

Basin features
- Tributaries
  - right: Middle Indian Creek and Little Indian Creek

Indian Creek is a stream in northeastern Douglas County and northwestern Howell County in the Ozarks of southern Missouri. It is a tributary of the North Fork River.

The stream source is adjacent to U.S. 63 just south of Sterling and northwest of Willow Springs. The stream flows south then turns west north of and parallel to Missouri Route 76 and enters Douglas County. The stream turns to the southwest and passes under Route 76–181 concurrency. The stream meanders southwest to its confluence with the North Fork south of the Topaz Mill and adjacent to Round Valley Knob. The entire stream course is within the Mark Twain National Forest.

Originally called Big Indian Creek, its name refers to the time of Indian (Native American) presence.
