= Assumption Abbey =

Assumption Abbey may refer to:

- Assumption Abbey (Missouri)
- Assumption Abbey (North Dakota)
