= Witty, Missouri =

Unincorporated community in Missouri, U.S.

Coordinates: 36°51′21″N 92°53′38″W

Witty is an unincorporated community in Douglas County, in the Ozarks of southern Missouri. The community is located adjacent to Little Beaver Creek along Missouri Route DD and is approximately 0.75 mi (1.21 km) east of the Douglas - Christian county line.

== History ==
A post office called Witty was established in 1892, and remained in operation until 1926. An early postmaster named Witty gave the community his name.
