= Vera Cruz, Missouri =

Unincorporated community in Missouri, U.S.

- Community
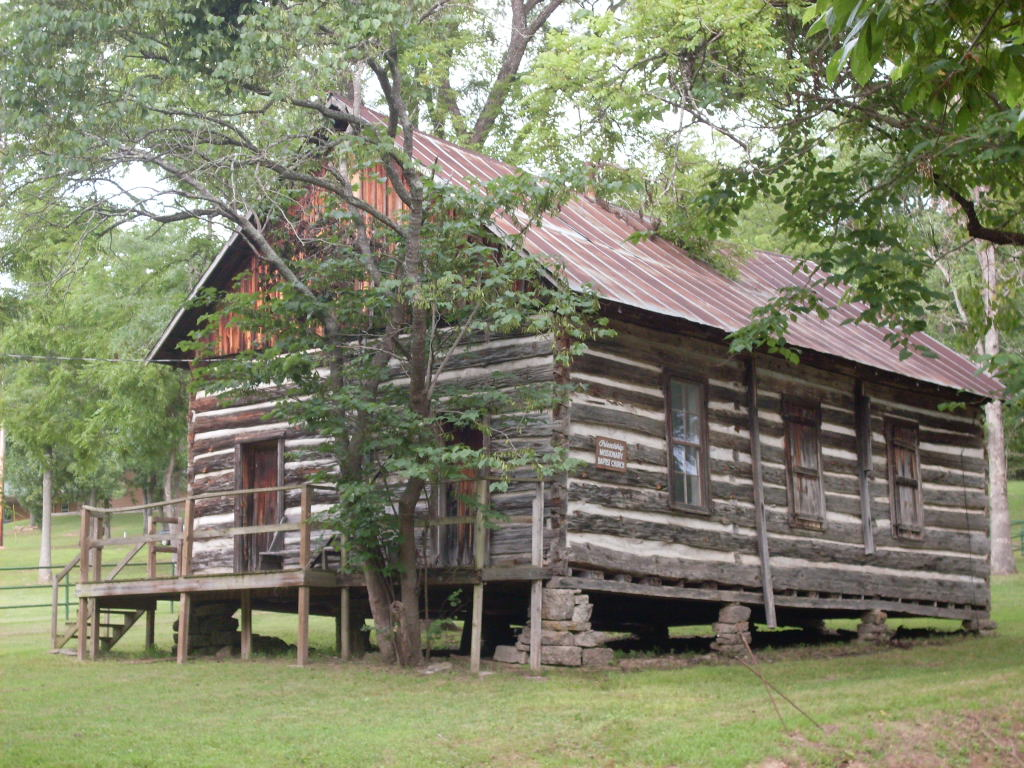
- The old log church in Vera Cruz by the cemetery

- Location of Vera Cruz, Missouri
- Coordinates: 36°54′50″N 92°29′37″W
- Country: U. S. A.
- State: Missouri
- County: Douglas County
- Elevation: 260 m (850 ft)
- Time zone: UTC-6 (CST)
  - Summer (DST): UTC-5 (CDT)

Vera Cruz (/ˌvɛrəˈkruːz/ VERR-ə-KROOZ) is an unincorporated community in central Douglas County, Missouri, United States. It is located on Bryant Creek, approximately 9 miles (14 km) east of Ava, at the terminus of Route AB.

== History ==
Vera Cruz was established in the 1840s and named for Vera Cruz in Mexico. The village was originally called Red Bud and was at the junction of the Rockbridge–Hartville road, up Bryant valley with the Old Salt Road or Rockbridge Road, which ran northwest through Smallett to Springfield. The name was changed to Vera Cruz in 1859. It was the first county seat of Douglas County. In 1870, the county seat was moved to Arno and shortly after to Ava.

The Civil War battle Battle of Clark's Mill on November 7, 1862, took place at a mill on Bryant Creek, approximately one mile (1.6 km) north of the current location. A second battle occurred on November 3, 1864, near Wilson's Mill, during which the Confederate forces were driven out of the area.

== Gallery ==
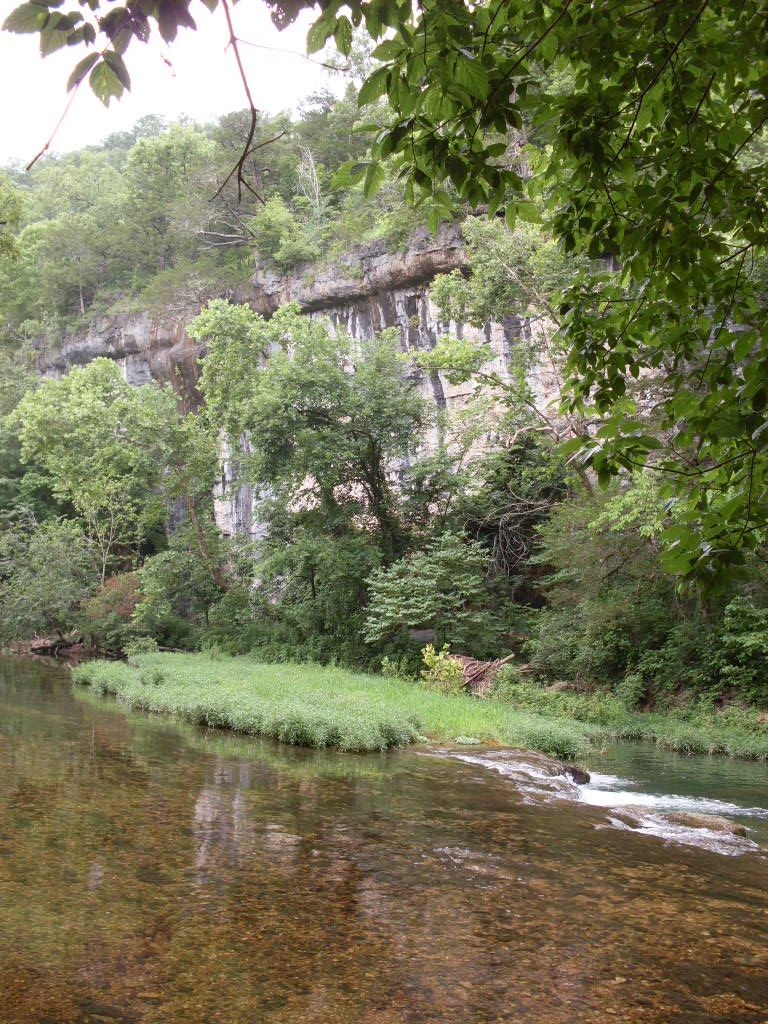
Hunter Creek bluff above the old mill pond at Vera Cruz, Missouri

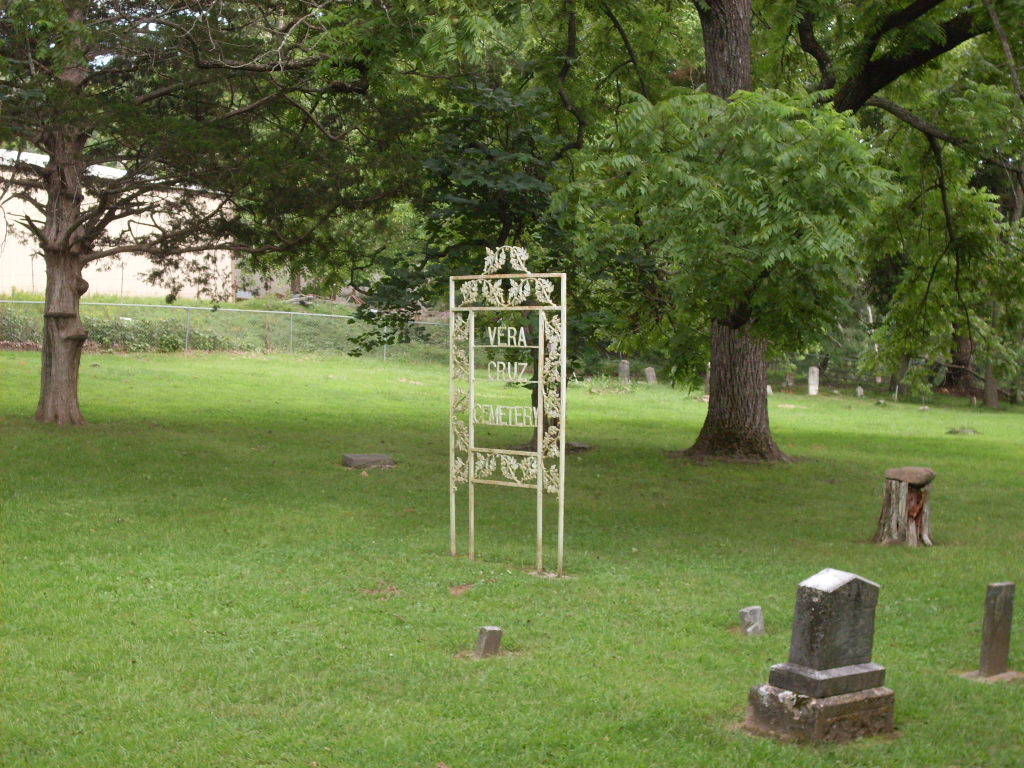
The cemetery in Vera Cruz, Missouri
