= Rome, Missouri =

Unincorporated community in Missouri, U.S.

- Community
- Location of Rome, Missouri Rome, Missouri (the United States)
- Coordinates: 36°50′30″N 92°46′24″W
- Country: U. S. A.
- State: Missouri
- County: Douglas County
- Elevation: 290 m (950 ft)
- Time zone: UTC-6 (CST)
  - Summer (DST): UTC-5 (CDT)

Rome is an unincorporated community in southern Douglas County, Missouri, United States. It is located on Beaver Creek, approximately 10 miles (16 km) southwest of Ava on a county road one-half mile off the end of Route A and 3 miles (4.8 km) west of Smallett. Arno lies on Beaver Creek, about 7 miles (11 km) north and Brownbranch in Taney County lies on Beaver Creek, 4.6 miles (7.4 km) to the southwest.

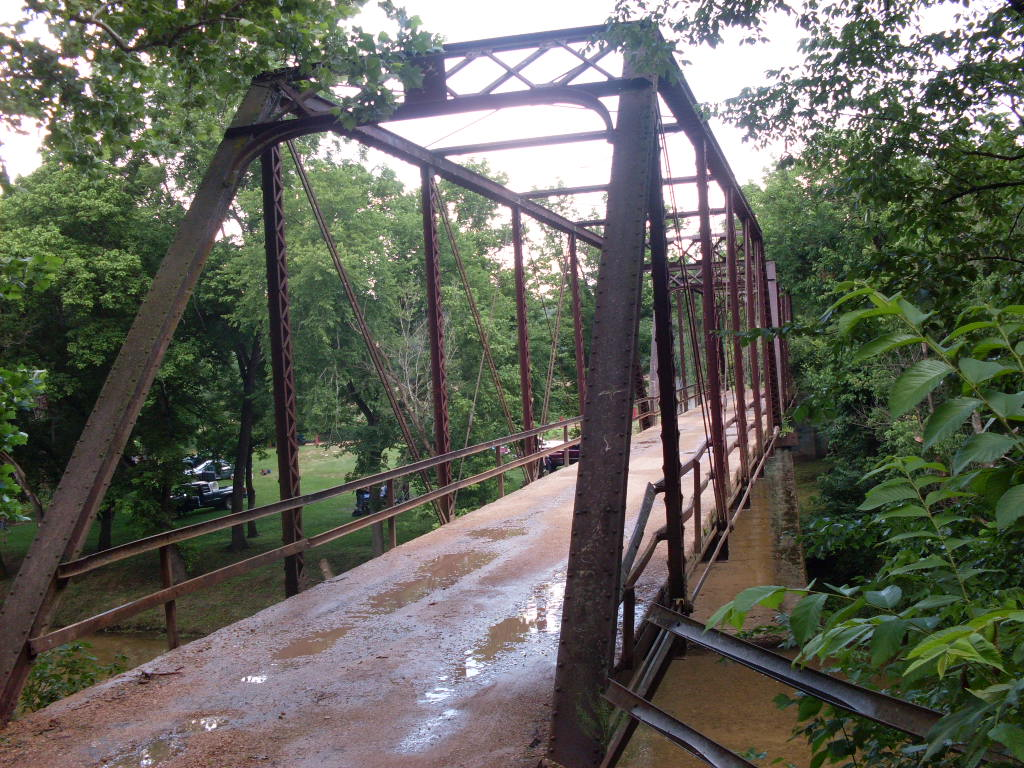
The old iron bridge over Beaver Creek at Rome was replaced in 2016.

== History ==
In 1840 Wright's Mill, built by James Wright, was at the location and was perhaps the earliest grist mill on Beaver Creek. Circa 1850, the Lawrence Mill, built by William Lawrence, was at the same location.

During the Civil War, Rome was the location of Lawrence Mill. Union forces built a blockhouse to defend the location. Fort Lawrence consisted of a two-story building or stockade with dimensions of 100 by 40 feet and was defended by militiamen or "Missouri home guards". Forces under the command of Confederate General Marmaduke attacked and burned the fort in January 1863 while on their way to Springfield.

Rome previously had its own post office from 1888–1957. The community was named after Rome, in Italy.

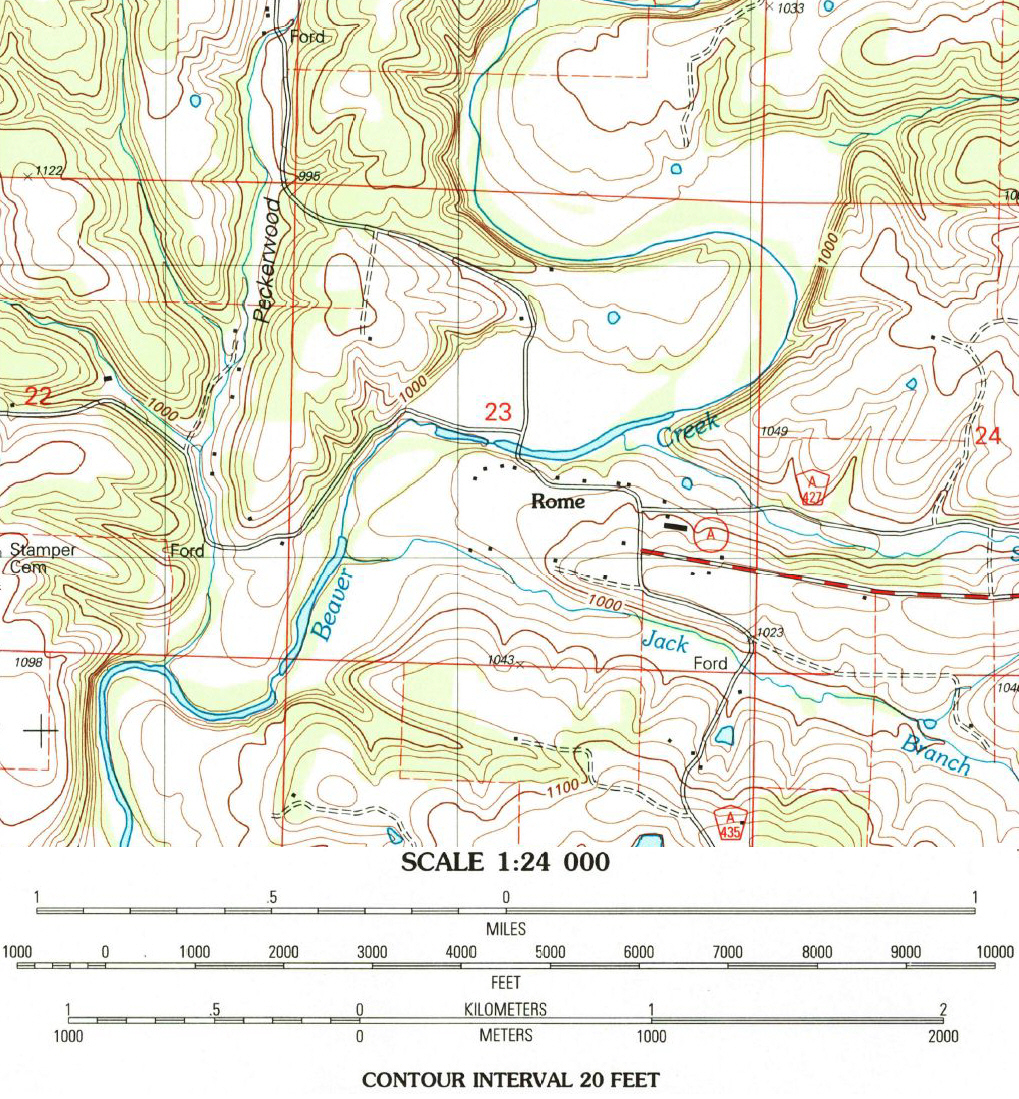
Section of the USGS Brownbranch, MO 7.5 minute topographic showing location w/scale
