= 3rd Missouri Cavalry Regiment (Confederate) =

3rd Missouri Cavalry Regiment (Greene's)
- Active: 4 November 1862–June 1865
- Country: Confederate States of America
- Allegiance: Confederate government of Missouri
- Branch: Confederate States Army
- Type: Cavalry
- Size: Regiment
- Engagements: Trans-Mississippi Theater of the American Civil War; Operations north of Boston Mountains; Battle of Clark's Mill; Marmaduke's First Expedition into Missouri; Battle of Hartville; Marmaduke's Second Expedition into Missouri; Little Rock Campaign; Battle of Helena; Battle of Brownsville; Battle of Bayou Meto; Battle of Bayou Fourche; Battle of Pine Bluff; Camden Expedition; Battle of Poison Spring; Battle of Jenkins' Ferry; Expedition to Lake Village; Battle of Ditch Bayou; Price's Raid; Battle of Pilot Knob; Battle of Glasgow; Battle of Little Blue River; Battle of Byram's Ford; Battle of Mine Creek

Commanders
- Notable commanders: Colton Greene

The 3rd Missouri Cavalry Regiment was a cavalry regiment of the Confederate States Army during the American Civil War. It was also known as Greene's Regiment after its commander, Colonel Colton Greene.

== History ==
=== Recruiting and Organization ===
The unit that became the 3rd Missouri Cavalry began recruiting after Brigadier General Martin E. Green requested division commander Major General Sterling Price to authorize Colonel Colton Greene and Lieutenant Colonel Leonidas C. Campbell to raise a regiment of partisan rangers in the Trans-Mississippi Department on 3 June 1862. In the late northern hemisphere summer of that year, Greene and Campbell began recruiting cavalry companies in southern Missouri, the former under the authority of the Confederate Secretary of War. The 3rd Missouri Cavalry was mustered into service as a regular cavalry unit at Pocahontas, Arkansas, on 4 November.

Company A was composed of men from Christian, Greene, and Webster Counties, Company B of men from Cape Girardeau, Iron, Madison, and St. Francois Counties, Company C of men from Reynolds, St. Francois, and Washington Counties, Company D of men from Webster and Wright Counties, Company E of men from Camden, Greene, and Pulaski Counties, Company F of men from Dent and Phelps Counties, Company G of men from Cedar and Webster Counties, Company H of men from Greene and Taney Counties, Company I of men from Dade, McDonald, and Newton Counties, and Company K of men from Ozark and Laclede Counties. Greene, Campbell, and Leonidas A. Campbell were appointed Colonel, Lieutenant Colonel, and Major, respectively, by the Confederate authorities, despite an unsuccessful attempt to elect field officers by the company officers.

=== 1862–1863 ===
Elements of the regiment saw their baptism of fire on 7 November when they joined Colonel John Q. Burbridge's Missouri cavalry brigade in an assault on a Union outpost near Clark's Mill in Douglas County. The 150 outnumbered Union troops surrendered after a brief action, and the brigade destroyed the outpost. On 24 November the brigade attacked a Union supply train in Wright County, killing and wounding 28 Union soldiers, capturing 45, and burning the 40 wagons of the train. In early December, the 3rd, 4th, and 8th Missouri Cavalry were subordinated to Colonel Moses J. White's brigade, newly organized at Pocahontas. On 28 December, near Van Buren, a detachment from the regiment participated in the capture of a Union forage party.

Colonel Joseph C. Porter took command of the brigade by early January 1863, when it participated in Brigadier General John S. Marmaduke's first raid into southwest Missouri, with a detachment from the 3rd Missouri Cavalry under the command of Lieutenant Colonel Campbell. During the Battle of Hartville on 11 January, the brigade was ambushed; the regiment lost six soldiers killed or mortally wounded and 19 other wounded in heavy fighting which ended after the Union troops retreated to Lebanon. Greene took command of the brigade after Porter was mortally wounded at Hartville, leading it in Marmaduke's second raid into southeast Missouri in late April, in which the regiment did not "closely engage" the Union troops. On 4 July it fought in the unsuccessful attack on Helena, suffering casualties of three killed and six wounded.

In the Little Rock campaign from late August to early September, the regiment unsuccessfully attempted to defend the city from a Union attack, suffering light casualties at the Battles of Brownsville, Bayou Meto, and Bayou Fourche. During the 25 October Battle of Pine Bluff, it dismounted and attacked the Pine Bluff Union garrison from the south, but was repulsed after an intense action, suffering casualties of three killed and seven wounded. Shortly afterwards, the 3rd Missouri Cavalry moved into winter quarters in southern Arkansas, where it passed the next several months uneventfully. Lieutenant Colonel Campbell died on 19 November; he was replaced by Major Leonidas A. Campbell, who was promoted to Lieutenant Colonel on 30 December. Company B Captain James Surridge simultaneously replaced Campbell as Major.

=== 1864–1865 ===
The combat service of the regiment in 1864 began with skirmishing between 31 March and 15 April, attempting to delay the advance of the army of Union Major General Frederick Steele during the Red River Campaign. In his Camden Expedition, Steele attempted to advance from Little Rock to Shreveport, Louisiana. After 15 April the latter shifted his route and took Camden, and on 18 April the regiment fought in the Battle of Poison Spring, in which it participated in the defeat of Union troops and the capture of a large forage train. After Steele retreated from Camden, the regiment, with Marmaduke's Brigade, pursued the Union forces and fought in the Battle of Jenkins' Ferry on 30 April. Alongside the 4th Missouri, the regiment moved into a swamp to scout the Union position, and advanced at sunrise, engaging the Union troops. In rain and fog, both regiments fought in a "spirited" manner for two hours before being relieved by an Arkansas infantry brigade. At Jenkins' Ferry, Steele managed to cross the Saline River and return to Little Rock. In Camden Expedition, the regiment suffered relatively heavy casualties of eight killed and 36 wounded.

During late May and early June, the 3rd Missouri Cavalry harassed Union shipping on the Mississippi River from positions on the west bank in Chicot County, Arkansas, sinking, burning, disabling, or damaging several boats. On 6 June it fought in the Battle of Ditch Bayou, forming part of the main Confederate line and delaying the Union advance over several hours.

== See also ==
- List of Missouri Confederate Civil War units
