= Isaac V. McPherson =

American politician (1868–1931)

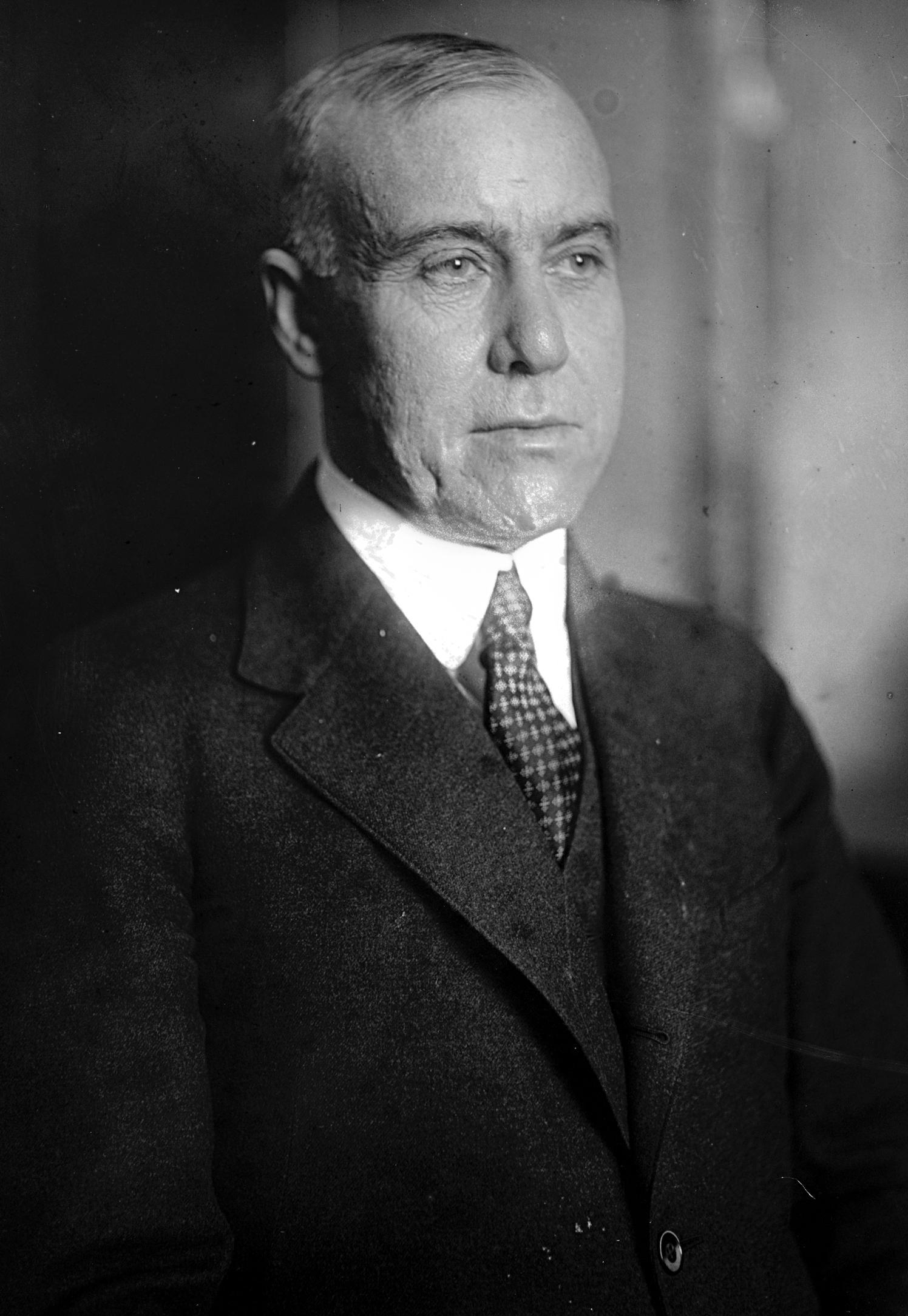

Member of the U.S. House of Representatives from Missouri's 15th district
- In office March 4, 1919 – March 3, 1923
- Preceded by: Perl D. Decker
- Succeeded by: Joe J. Manlove

Personal details
- Born: Isaac Vanubrt McPherson; March 8, 1868 Rome, Missouri
- Died: October 31, 1931 (aged 63) Aurora, Missouri
- Party: Republican
- Education: Marionville College

Isaac Vanburt McPherson (March 8, 1868 – October 31, 1931) was a U.S. representative from Missouri.

Born near Rome, Missouri, McPherson moved to Bradleyville, Missouri, with his parents. He attended Springfield High School in Missouri, and Marionville College in Marionville, Missouri. He studied law, was admitted to the bar in 1889, and commenced practice in Mount Vernon, Missouri. He served as prosecuting attorney of Lawrence County in 1901 and 1902. He served as member of the Missouri House of Representatives in 1903 and 1904. He was appointed postmaster at Aurora, Missouri, in 1905 and served until 1912. He continued the practice of law in Aurora, Missouri.

McPherson was elected as a Republican to the Sixty-sixth and Sixty-seventh Congresses (March 4, 1919 – March 3, 1923). He was an unsuccessful candidate for renomination in 1922. He was appointed as assistant counsel in the legal department of the United States Shipping Board Emergency Fleet Corporation in 1923 and served in that capacity until his death in Aurora, Missouri on October 31, 1931. He was interred in Maple Park Cemetery.

U.S. House of Representatives
Preceded by Perl D. Decker	Member of the U.S. House of Representatives from Missouri's 15th congressional district 1919–1923	Succeeded by Joe J. Manlove
