= Bryant, Missouri =

Extinct town in the American state of Missouri

Bryant is an extinct town in Douglas County, Missouri. The GNIS classifies it as a populated place. It lies next to Bryant Creek, just north of the confluence with Mill Hollow, near the Missouri Highway 5 bridge crossing Bryant Creek. An old store called Midway once stood one mile downstream at the site of the old Bryant Bridge along the old Highway 5, at 37°01′46″N 92°35′43″W.

Bryant had a post office named Bryant that operated from 1888 to 1941. The community was named after the nearby Bryant Creek.
