= Richville =

Richville may refer to a community in the United States:

- Richville, Michigan
- Richville, Douglas County, Missouri
- Richville, Holt County, Missouri
- Richville, Minnesota
- Richville, New York
- Richville, Ohio
