= Olathia, Missouri =

Unincorporated community in Missouri, U.S.

Coordinates: 37°01′38″N 92°31′11″W

Olathia is a community in north-central Douglas County, Missouri United States. It is located approximately six miles southeast of Mansfield along Missouri Route U and is nine miles northeast of Ava. It is on a ridge between Puncheon Camp Creek one-half mile to the northeast and Bryant Creek one and a quarter mile to the southwest.

The community has also been called Olathe and may have been named for Olathe, Kansas. The community had a post office between 1895 and 1910.
