= Joe J. Manlove =

American politician (1876–1956)

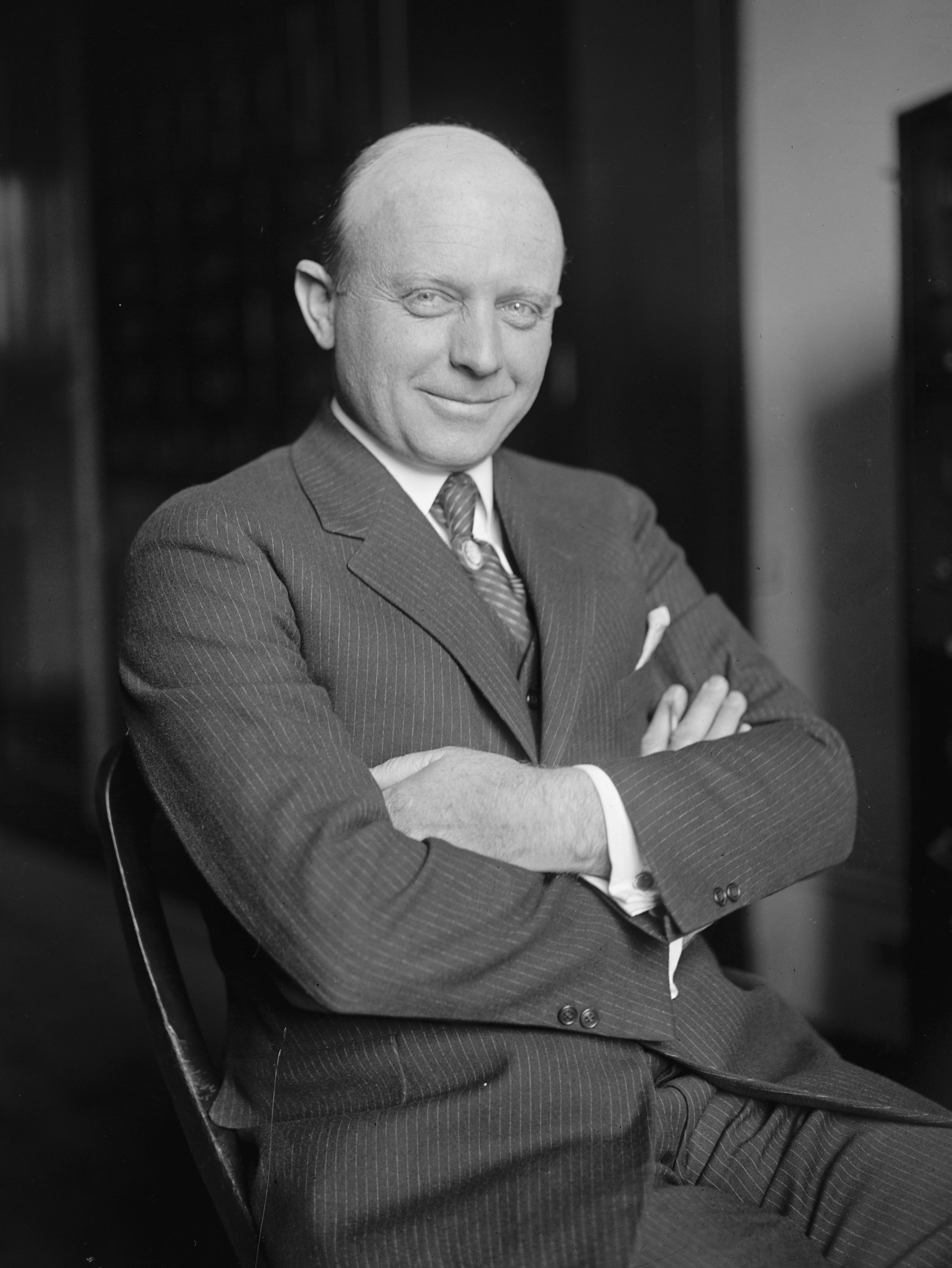
- Manlove in March 1923

Member of the U.S. House of Representatives from Missouri's 15th district
- In office March 4, 1923 – March 3, 1933
- Preceded by: Isaac V. McPherson
- Succeeded by: District dissolved

Personal details
- Born: October 1, 1876 near Carthage, Missouri, U.S.
- Died: January 31, 1956 (aged 79) Joplin, Missouri, U.S.
- Resting place: Mount Hope Cemetery
- Party: Republican
- Education: Presbyterian Academy

Joe Jonathan Manlove (October 1, 1876 – January 31, 1956) was a U.S. representative from Missouri.

Born on a farm near Carthage, Missouri, Manlove attended the public schools and graduated from Presbyterian Academy at Mount Vernon, Missouri. He studied law. He was admitted to the bar in 1897 and commenced practice in Mount Vernon, Missouri. He also engaged in agricultural pursuits, in the livestock business, and in the general development of southwest Missouri. He was an unsuccessful Republican candidate for election in 1914 to the Sixty-fourth Congress and in 1916 to the Sixty-fifth Congress.

Manlove was elected as a Republican to the Sixty-eighth and to the four succeeding Congresses (March 4, 1923 – March 3, 1933). He was an unsuccessful candidate for reelection in 1932 to the Seventy-third Congress. He was also an unsuccessful candidate for the Republican nomination for Congress in 1934. He resumed the practice of law and also engaged in the real estate business in Joplin, Missouri. In 1943 he was elected one of the delegates to write a new constitution for the State of Missouri and served as a member of the constitutional convention. He died in Joplin, Missouri on January 31, 1956. He was interred in Mount Hope Cemetery near Joplin, Missouri.

U.S. House of Representatives
Preceded by Isaac V. McPherson	Member of the U.S. House of Representatives from Missouri's 15th congressional district 1923–1933	Succeeded by District dissolved
