= Granada, Missouri =

Unincorporated community in Missouri, U.S.

Coordinates: 37°01′40″N 92°44′12″W

Granada is an unincorporated community in northwest Douglas County, Missouri, United States. The community was located on the west bank of Honey Creek (tributary to Beaver Creek), approximately 1.5 miles north of Missouri Route 14 on county road 14-531.

== History ==
A post office called Granada was established in 1894, and remained in operation until 1922. The community's name is a transfer from Granada, in Spain.
