= Fielden, Missouri =

Unincorporated community in Missouri, U.S.

Coordinates: 36°51′43″N 92°23′00″W

Fielden is an unincorporated community in south central Douglas County, Missouri, United States. Fielden is located on the floodplain of Fox Creek along County Road 14-343, south of Missouri Route 14 and west of Gentryville. The townsite is at an elevation of 778 ft (237 m).

== History ==
A post office called Fielden was established in 1894, and remained in operation until 1909. The community took its name from a local sawmill of the same name.
