= Smallett, Missouri =

Unincorporated community in Missouri, U.S.

- Community
- Location of Smallett, Missouri Smallett, Missouri (the United States)
- Coordinates: 36°50′58″N 92°42′56″W
- Country: U. S. A.
- State: Missouri
- County: Douglas County
- Elevation: 330 m (1,070 ft)
- Time zone: UTC-6 (CST)
  - Summer (DST): UTC-5 (CDT)
- Zip Code: 65750 (historical)
- GNIS feature ID: 758446

Smallett is an unincorporated community in southern Douglas County, Missouri, United States. It is located approximately nine miles south of Ava and is located on Missouri Supplemental Route A. It previously had its own post office from 1888-1967 with ZIP code 65750, but mail is now served by the post office in Ava. Some say Smallett was named for its first postmaster, James Small, while others believe the name honors another early settler.

Smallett lies on the South Spring Creek about three miles north of the Douglas–Ozark county line. The village sits on the south bank of South Spring Creek at an elevation of 1,056 feet (322 m). The lookout tower five miles east at Squires sits at an elevation of 1,517 ft (462 m). The Haden Bald area of the Mark Twain National Forest due south in Ozark County rises to an elevation of around 1,460 ft (450 m).
