= Rippee, Missouri =

- Historic community
- Location of Rippee, Missouri Rippee, Missouri (the United States)
- Coordinates: 36°52′12″N 92°27′57″W
- Country: United States
- State: Missouri
- County: Douglas County
- Elevation: 239 m (784 ft)
- Time zone: UTC-6 (CST)
  - Summer (DST): UTC-5 (CDT)

Rippee is an historic town in south central Douglas County, Missouri, United States. The Rippee townsite was located on the northwest side of the Bryant Creek floodplain, due east of the confluence of Rippee Creek, which joins the Bryant from the west. The site lies at an elevation of 784 ft (239 m) and approximately 1.25 mi (2.01 km) south of the Missouri Route 14 bridge over the Bryant. The location is currently within the Rippee State Wildlife Management Area overseen by the Missouri Department of Conservation.

A post office called Rippee was established in 1892, and remained in operation until 1936. The community has the name of the local Rippee family.
