= Battle of Clark's Mill =

Battle of the American Civil War

Coordinates: 36°55′15″N 92°29′20″W

- Part of the Trans-Mississippi Theater of the American Civil War
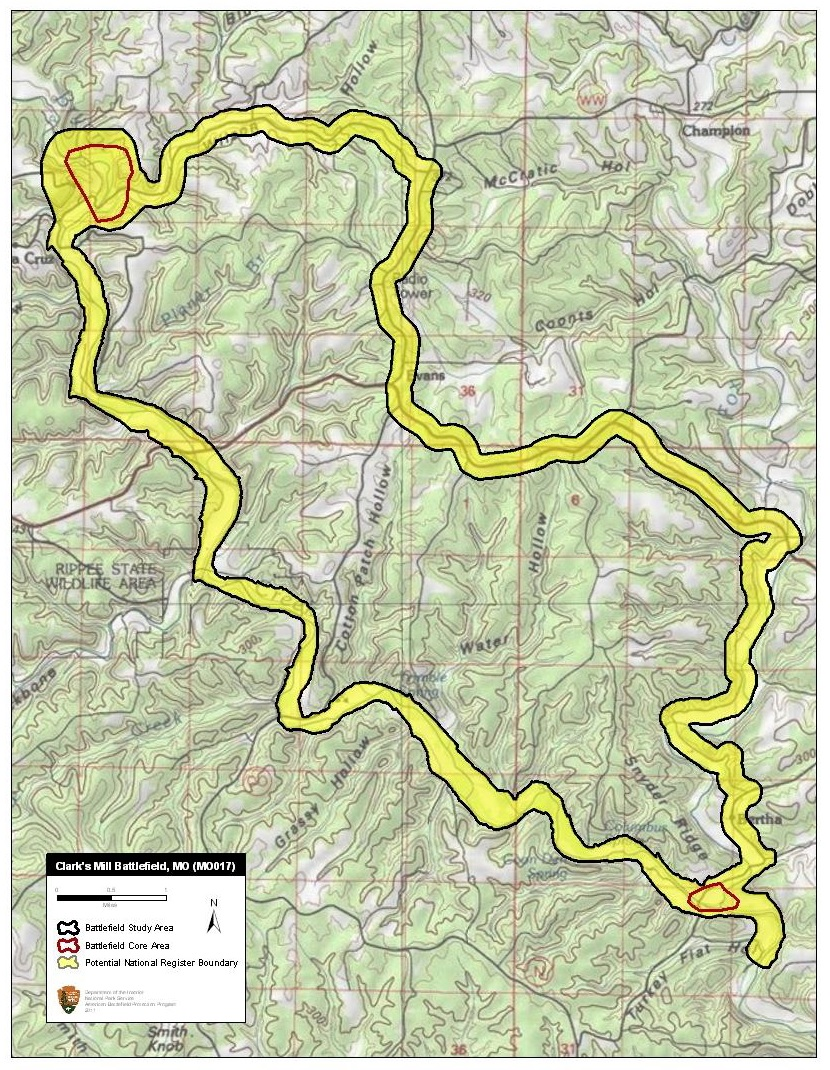
- Map of Clark's Mill Battlefield core and study areas by the American Battlefield Protection Program
| Date | November 7, 1862 |
| Location | Near Vera Cruz, Missouri |
| Result | Confederate victory |

Belligerents
| United States (Union) | (Confederate States of America) CSA (Confederacy) |

Commanders and leaders
| Hiram E. Barstow | John Q. Burbridge; Colton Greene |

Units involved
| 10th Illinois Cavalry; 2nd Missouri State Militia Cavalry | 3rd Missouri Cavalry Regiment; 4th Missouri Cavalry Regiment |

Strength
| 100 to 200 | At least 1,000 |

The Battle of Clark's Mill was fought on November 7, 1862, near Vera Cruz, Missouri, as part of the American Civil War. Confederate troops led by Colonels Colton Greene and John Q. Burbridge were recruiting in the Gainesville area. Union Captain Hiram E. Barstow commanded a detachment at Clark's Mill near Vera Cruz, and heard rumors of Confederate depredations around Gainesville. In response, Barstow sent patrols towards Gainesville and Rockbridge, personally accompanying the latter. Confederate forces were encountered before reaching Rockbridge, and Barstow fell back to Clark's Mill. The Confederates arrived from multiple directions, and after a skirmish of five hours, surrounded the Union position. With night falling, the Confederates offered Barstow surrender terms that were accepted. The Union soldiers were paroled and their blockhouse destroyed; both Barstow and the Confederates left the area after the skirmish. A Union counterstroke left Ozark the next day.

== Background ==
Early in the American Civil War, the state of Missouri was hotly contested. The state's citizens were divided between Confederate sympathizers and those loyal to United States federal government (known as the Union). A coalition of Confederate and Missouri State Guard (a pro-Confederate state militia) forces defeated Union forces in the Battle of Wilson's Creek in August 1861, and Missouri State Guard troops drove to the Missouri River later that year, but by the end of the year, were restricted to southwestern Missouri. Missouri had two competing governments: a Union government, and the competing Confederate government of Missouri, which was unable to exercise territorial control of the state.

In early March 1862, Confederate and Missouri State Guard forces were defeated in the Battle of Pea Ridge in northern Arkansas; the battle secured Missouri for the Union. The Missouri State Guard was mostly merged into the regular Confederate army after the battle, and both sides transferred troops out of the Ozarks region. Union leadership, including regional commander John M. Schofield, viewed the area as a now-quiet theater of the war. By the middle of the year, increased Confederate activity in the state proved this perception to be wrong. Besides guerrilla warfare, Confederate Major General Thomas C. Hindman had led some of his forces into southwestern Missouri from Arkansas. While Hindman's regular Confederate troops withdrew in early October not long after the First Battle of Newtonia, a guerrilla presence remained in the Ozarks.

== Battle ==
Some of the Confederate troops included men recruited by Colonels Colton Greene and John Q. Burbridge. Burbridge's command was what later became the 4th Missouri Cavalry Regiment, while Greene's became the 3rd Missouri Cavalry Regiment. Greene and Burbridge were operating in the vicinity of Gainesville. There was a Union presence in the area, about 30 miles (48 km) north of Gainesville. Under the command of Captain Hiram E. Barstow, this force was based at Clark's Mill near Vera Cruz. The historian Louis Gerteis credits Barstow with about 100 men, roughly half of whom were from the 10th Illinois Cavalry Regiment and the rest of whom were militiamen, while the historian Bruce Nichols places Barstow's strength at about 200 men. Barstow's post-battle report stated that he had about 110 men. The militiamen were from the 2nd Missouri Militia Cavalry. Barstow had previously been informed of Confederate activities in the region, but previous scares had turned out to be false alarms. On the morning of November 7, Barstow sent twenty men to Gainesville in response to rumors of Confederate depredations there, while he personally led a similarly-sized force in the direction of Rockbridge.

Around 5 miles (8 km) from Rockbridge, Barstow's patrol encountered Confederate troops. According to Barstow's post-battle report, this clash resulted in nine Confederate dead and four Union casualties, two of whom were dead. Outnumbered and aware of Confederates approaching from multiple directions, Barstow fell back to Clark's Mill. Most of his troops were only armed with handguns, although the Union troops did have a 2-pounder cannon or two. Barstow sent one messenger to the twenty men sent to Gainesville, and another to the Union outpost at Marshfield, but the latter was unable to get through Confederate lines.

Arriving from several directions, Confederate forces surrounded Barstow's post. Gerteis places Confederate strength at over 1,500, the preservationist Frances E. Kennedy attributes Confederate strength as about 1,750 men, and a battle summary prepared by Ohio State University estimates the Confederate strength as being about 1,000 men. The Confederates also had four 6-pounder cannons. Fighting at Clark's Mill opened at 11:00 am. The action lasted for five hours, which Barstow described as periodic firing until the Union picket line was driven in. The local historian Danny Keller describes the action as an artillery duel that ended with the Confederates surrounding the Union position and cutting its line of retreat. During the course of the battle, the Union soldiers used up their available ammunition. With night falling, Burbridge sent a message under flag of truce offering Barstow surrender terms; the Union officer accepted. The Union soldiers were paroled and the blockhouse at Clark's Mill was destroyed. According to the historian James E. McGhee, the Confederates captured 200 stand of arms, two cannon, roughly $40,000 of supplies, and many horses. Barstow's post-battle report claimed that the Confederates had promised the Union prisoners that they would retain their personal property, but then took their horses.

== Aftermath ==
Barstow's report claimed that the Union lost seven men killed and two wounded, while he believed that 34 Confederates had been killed in action, with more wounded. Burbridge, in turn, acknowledged Confederate casualties of four wounded. Nichols places Union losses as four killed and roughly 150 captured. Kennedy places Union losses as 119, of whom 113 were captured. McGhee states that about 150 Union soldiers were captured. Following the battle, Barstow made his way to Marshfield, while the Confederates moved on from the Clark's Mill area, withdrawing up Bryant Creek. More troops from the 14th Missouri State Militia Cavalry made a counterstroke the day after the battle, moving from Ozark into Douglas County, and then heading to Dubuque, Arkansas, killing or capturing about 30 Confederates along the way.

== Sources ==
- Gerteis, Louis S. (2012). The Civil War in Missouri. Columbia, Missouri: University of Missouri Press. ISBN 978-0-8262-1972-5.
- Ingenthron, Elmo (1980). Borderland Rebellion: A History of the Civil War on the Missouri–Arkansas Border. Forsyth, Missouri: The Ozarks Mountaineer. OCLC 7157026.
- Kennedy, Frances H., ed. (1998). The Civil War Battlefield Guide (2nd ed.). Boston/New York: Houghton Mifflin. ISBN 978-0-395-74012-5.
- McGhee, James E. (2008). Guide to Missouri Confederate Regiments, 1861–1865. Fayetteville, Arkansas: University of Arkansas Press. ISBN 978-1-55728-870-7.
- Nichols, Bruce (2012) [2004]. Guerrilla Warfare in Civil War Missouri. Vol. I, 1862. Jefferson, North Carolina: McFarland & Co. ISBN 978-0-7864-6927-7.
- Official Records of the Union and Confederate Armies in the War of the Rebellion. Washington D.C.: Government Printing Office. 1885. OCLC 427057.
- Steele, Phillip W.; Cottrell, Steve (1993). Civil War in the Ozarks. Gretna, Louisiana: Pelican. ISBN 0-88289-988-0.
