= Hebron, Missouri =

Unincorporated community in Missouri, U.S.

Coordinates: 36°51′08″N 92°09′12″W

Hebron is an unincorporated community in southeastern Douglas County, Missouri, United States. Hebron is located at the intersection of a county road with Hebron Hollow, which is a spring-fed tributary to the North Fork River to the southwest. Missouri Route 181 is approximately 3/4 mile to the east. Hebron Boat Access and campground is located on the North Fork, about two miles to the west on Missouri Route AA.

== History ==
A post office called Hebron was established in 1905, and remained in operation until 1935. The community was named after the ancient city of Hebron.
