= Merritt, Missouri =

Unincorporated community in Missouri, U.S.

Coordinates: 36°53′55″N 92°52′10″W

Merritt is an unincorporated community in southwestern Douglas County, Missouri, United States. It is located west of Goodhope on Missouri Route T in the Little Beaver Creek valley, as well as south-east of Springfield, Missouri.

The Merritt store no longer exists, however, the Old Merritt store is still present approximately 1.25 miles west on Route T.

== History ==
A post office called Merritt was established in 1903, and remained in operation until 1930. William Merrit, an early postmaster, gave the community his last name.
