= Hest, Missouri =

Unincorporated community in Missouri, U.S.

Coordinates: 36°53′45″N 92°40′53″W

Hest is an unincorporated community in Douglas County, Missouri, United States.

The community lies along Missouri Route 5, approximately two miles south of the southern city limits of Ava and one-half mile north of the intersection of Route 5 and Missouri Route A. The site sits above the west bank of North Spring Creek. The Spring Creek Cemetery lies just west of the community.

The community had a post office from 1915 until 1925.
