= Marilyn Cade =

American Internet activist and ICANN co-founder (1947–2020)

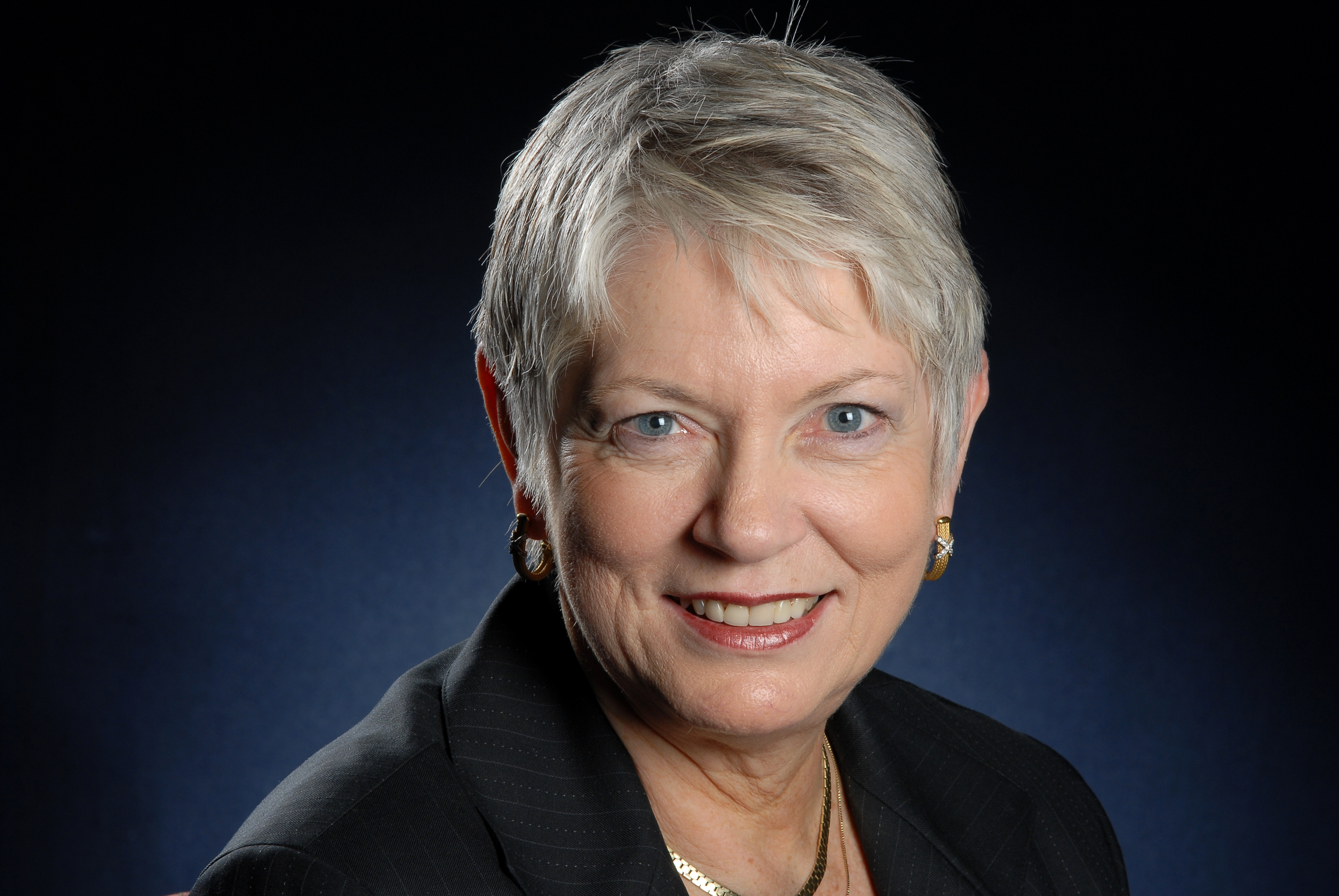
- Cade in 2009
- Born: November 24, 1947
- Died: November 3, 2020 (aged 72)
- Education: Saint Louis University

Marilyn Cade (November 24, 1947 – November 3, 2020) was an Internet activist and one of the co-founders of ICANN.

== Education ==
Cade received a Master of Social Work in Organizational Development from Saint Louis University.

== Career ==
Cade started her career in the 1970s as a social worker in Missouri, and spent 10 years working in various nonprofit organizations and state governments of the United States positions.

=== AT&T ===
In the 1980s, Cade began working at AT&T, working her way up through a number of management positions with AT&T’s business units in sales, marketing, business operations and strategy. By the early 1990s, Cade became a major fundraiser for Bill Clinton, working her way up to become AT&T's chief lobbyist on technology policy issues as the Director of Internet and E-commerce Advocacy.

Cade was appointed to support AT&T's participation in the International Telecommunication Union Secretary General's High Level Expert Group on Cyber Security in early 2008.

Cade helped to found and lead numerous industry coalitions and initiatives, ranging from e-commerce, copyright and trademark, cyber crime, child safety online, and internet governance. Her leadership was paramount in the restructuring of the Ad Hoc Copyright Coalition, the Online Privacy Alliance and GetNetWise.

=== 2000s ===
After retiring from AT&T, Cade founded a consulting business, mCADE ICT Strategies. She advised organizations such as the World Information Technology and Services Alliance about international internet policy matters.

== Activism ==
Cade being interviewed about her time at ICANN

She was also Chief Catalyst at the Internet Governance Forum USA. She helped IGF become a global platform, working to help other countries organize their own national IGF conferences, and worked for the inclusion of communities from developing countries to help them with their own National, Regional and Youth initiatives. Cade emphasized what was called the "multi-stakeholder model" of internet governance, working to maximize inclusive policymaking and taking an active role in mentoring.

She was a founder of ICANN's Business Constituency trying to help NGOs work alongside businesses to work on Internet infrastructure issues.

== Awards ==
Cade was posthumously awarded the 2021 ICANN Community Excellence Award, alongside Rafik Dammak.

== Personal life ==
Cade grew up in the rural town of Ava, Missouri with one sister who died in 2016.
