= Arden, Missouri =

Unincorporated community in Missouri, U.S.

Coordinates: 36°59′07″N 92°48′17″W

Arden is an unincorporated community in western Douglas County, Missouri, United States. Arden is located on a ridge along Missouri Route O between Missouri Route 14 to the north and the community of Red Bank to the south. The community is on a ridge of Keyger Mountain at an elevation of 1,362 ft (415 m).

== History ==
A post office called Arden was established in 1886, and remained in operation until 1924. The community's name alludes to the Forest of Arden, the setting of William Shakespeare's As You Like It.

In 1925, Arden had 33 inhabitants.
