= Mill Hollow =

Valley in the American state of Missouri

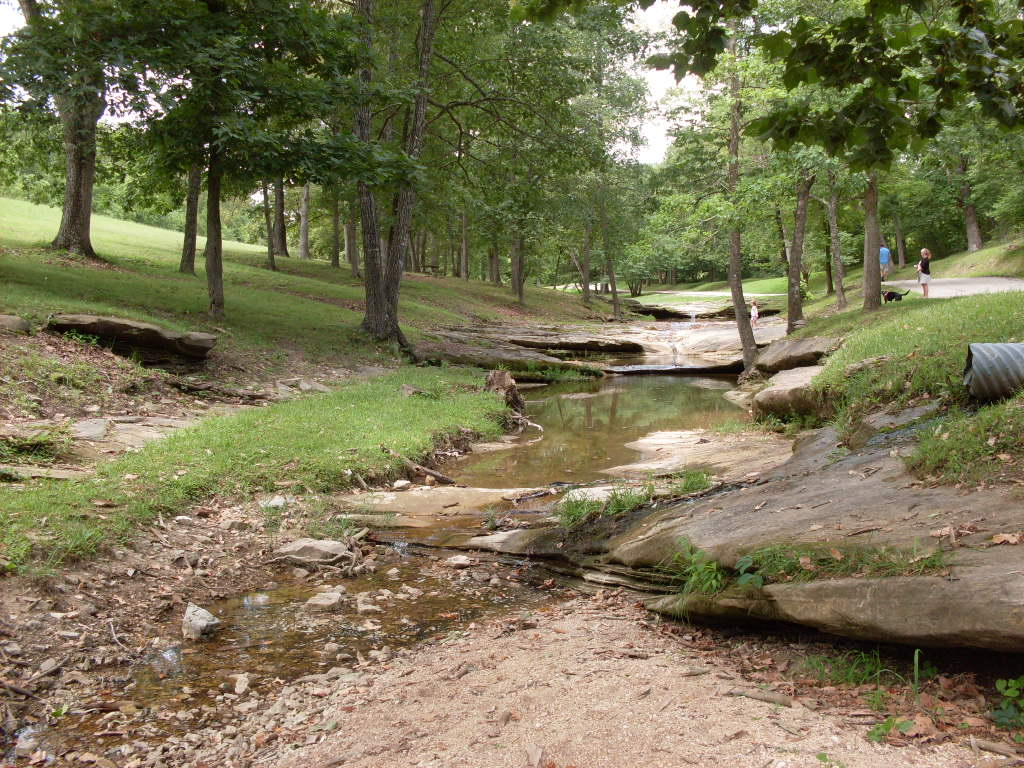
Roadside park in Mill Hollow adjacent to Missouri Route 5

Mill Hollow is a valley in northern Douglas County the Ozarks of southern Missouri.

The headwaters of the stream that occupies the hollow are at 37°01′28″N 92°38′26″W and the confluence with Bryant Creek is at 37°02′06″N 92°36′33″W. The stream in the valley is fed by a perennial spring with its source near the upper reaches of the valley. Missouri Route 5 runs parallel to the valley on the southeast side. The valley is the location of Ava Roadside Park which lies adjacent to Route 5 five miles north of Ava.

Mill Hollow was named for a mill which once stood in the valley in the 1830s.
