= Assumption Abbey, Missouri =

Religious house in Missouri, USA

Assumption Abbey, also known as the Abbey of Our Lady of the Assumption, is a community of monks of the Cistercian Order of the Strict Observance, popularly known as Trappists. The Abbey, is located in Douglas County, seventy-five miles southeast of Springfield, Missouri.

== History ==
The monks first came to Ava, Missouri from New Melleray Abbey in Iowa in 1950 to establish the monastic life there. They run a successful business selling fruitcakes. After the number of monks continued to decrease for decades, the Trappist monks gave their monastery to a group of Cistercians from Vietnam in 2019.
