= Blanche, Missouri =

Unincorporated community in Missouri, U.S.

Coordinates: 36°49′12″N 92°18′12″W

Blanche is a community in southeast Douglas County in the U.S. state of Missouri.

The community is on a county road one half mile west of Missouri Route AC and one mile south of Missouri Route 14. It is on a ridge above the headwaters of Dry Creek which is a tributary of Bryant Creek in adjacent Ozark County.

The community had a post office from 1896 through 1958.
