= Cheney, Missouri =

Unincorporated community in Missouri, U.S.

Coordinates: 36°54′25″N 92°26′30″W

Cheney is an unincorporated community in Douglas County, in the Ozarks of southern Missouri. The community was located on Missouri Route C, approximately one mile north of Evans on Missouri Route 14.

== History ==
A post office called Cheney was established in 1898, and remained in operation until 1934. The community has the name of A. B. Cheney, a pioneer citizen.
