= Squires, Missouri =

Unincorporated community in Missouri, U.S.

- Community
- Location of Squires, Missouri
- Coordinates: 36°51′05″N 92°37′30″W
- Country: United States
- State: Missouri
- County: Douglas County
- Elevation: 1,371 ft (418 m)
- Time zone: UTC-6 (CST)
  - Summer (DST): UTC-5 (CDT)
- Zip Code: 65755
- GNIS feature ID: 752331

Squires is an Unincorporated community in Douglas County, Missouri, United States. Squires is located approximately 9 miles (14 km) south of Ava on Route 5 at the intersection with Route JJ. The Squires fire tower is located one-quarter mile to the southwest, at an elevation of 1,517 feet (462 m). Wasola in Ozark County is about 5 miles (8.0 km) to the southeast.

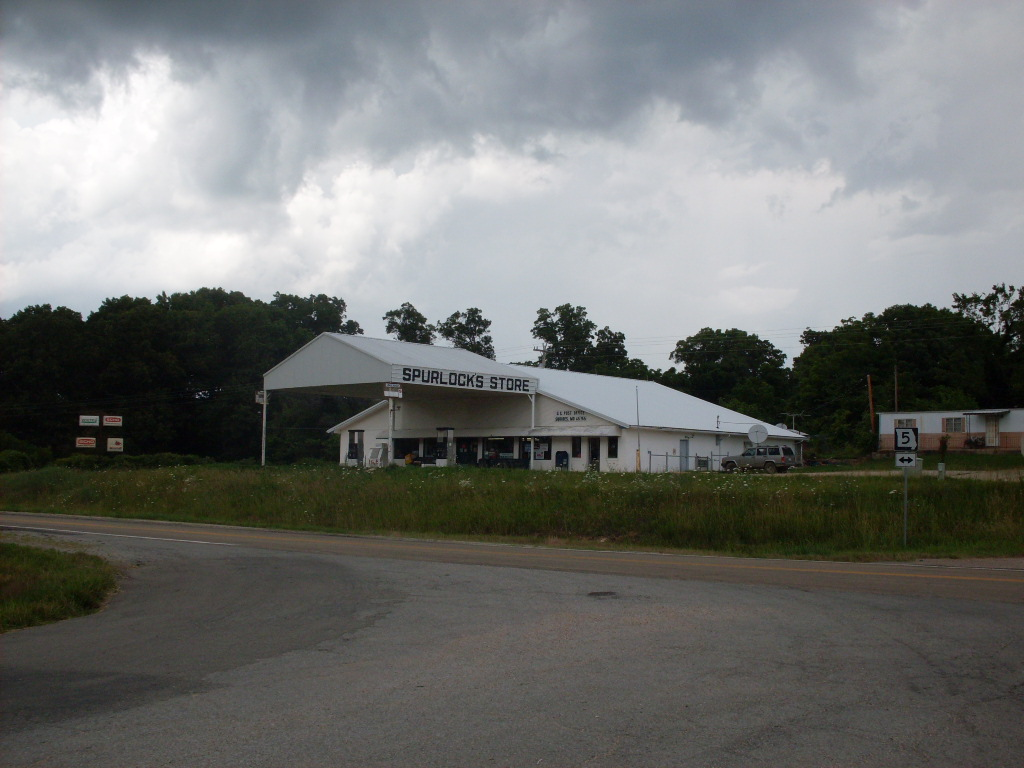
The store at Squires, Missouri in June 2014

The original Post Office application was filed by John Squire, an Englishman, who wanted to establish the Post Office of "Squire's, Missouri" to be housed in his general store. The Squires post office was established in 1889. Thus, Squires, Missouri became the name for a crossroads location where cattle were corralled nightly by Arkansas farmers who were taking their cattle to market in Springfield, Missouri.

Squires has not changed much in the past 20 years. However, in the late 19th century, Squires was a thriving community with all the prospects of becoming a decently sized town. Today, Squires is home to Spurlock's Store (a hundred-year old family business), Squires Post Office, Squires Volunteer Fire Department, Porter's Cafe, Porter's Garage, and the Douglas County Livestock Auction Barn. Nearby is a Fire Lookout Tower which is maintained and operated by the Missouri Department of Conservation.
