= Filer, Missouri =

Unincorporated community in Missouri, U.S.

Coordinates: 37°01′47″N 92°24′53″W

Filer is an unincorporated community in northern Douglas County, in the Ozarks of southern Missouri. The community is located on Tick Ridge along Missouri Route C, approximately 3 mi (4.8 km) south of the Douglas – Wright county line.

== History ==
A post office called Filer was established in 1895, and remained in operation until 1913. The community has the name of the Filer family.
