= Richville, Douglas County, Missouri =

Unincorporated community in Missouri, U.S.

Coordinates: 36°50′25″N 92°14′22″W

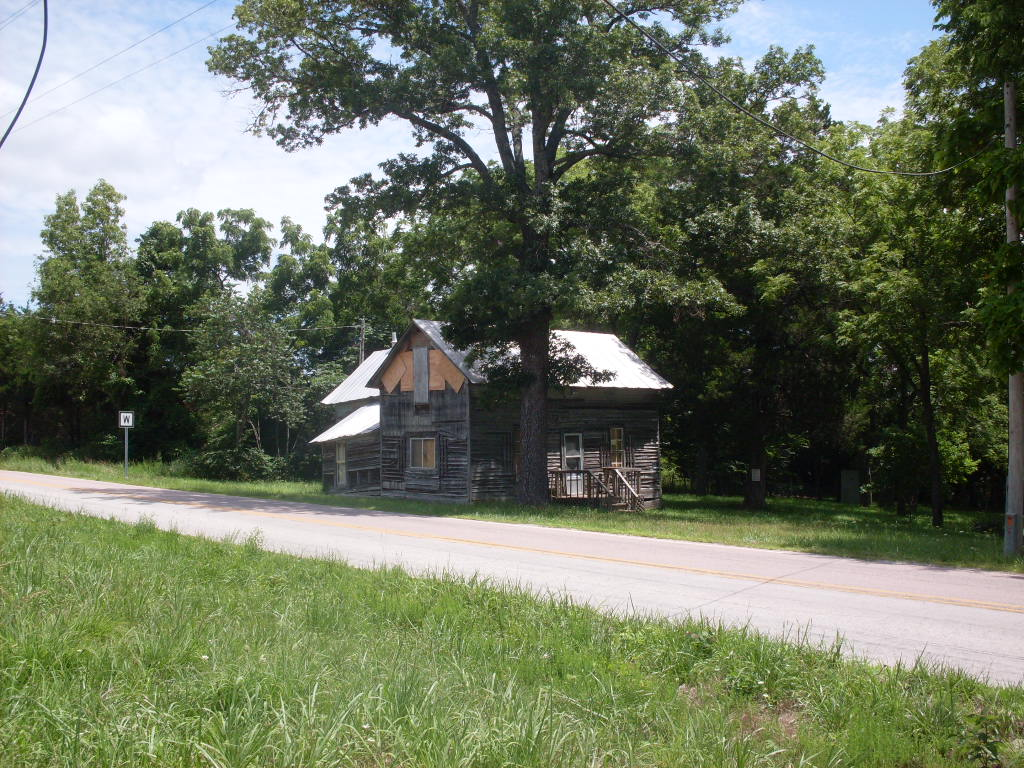
House near where the old Richville store stood along Route W

Richville is an unincorporated community in southeastern Douglas County, Missouri, United States. Richville is located at the intersection of Missouri State Route 14 and State route W and a short distance west of the intersection of Route 14 and Missouri State Route 181. The site is located on a high ridge at an elevation of 1,191 ft (363 m). Sauls Knob at 1,339 ft (408 m) lies just to the southeast on the south side of Route 14.

== History ==
A post office called Richville was established in 1870, and remained in operation until 1933. The community was named after the local Rich family.
