= Cross Roads, Douglas County, Missouri =

Unincorporated community in Missouri, U.S.

Cross Roads, Missouri
- Historic community
- Location of Cross Roads, Missouri Cross Roads, Missouri (the United States)
- Coordinates: 36°51′01″N 92°51′16″W
- Country: U. S. A.
- State: Missouri
- County: Douglas County
- Elevation: 376 m (1,234 ft)
- Time zone: UTC-6 (CST)
  - Summer (DST): UTC-5 (CDT)
- GNIS feature ID: 749532

Cross Roads is an unincorporated community in Douglas County, Missouri, United States. Cross Roads is in the southwest corner of the county on Missouri Route DD, west of Missouri Route 76. It is located on the edge of the Mark Twain National Forest.

== History ==
A post office called Cross Roads was established in 1909, and remained in operation until 1959. The community was named after the intersection at the original town site.
