= Topaz, Missouri =

Unincorporated community in Missouri, U.S.

Coordinates: 36°56′44″N 92°12′11″W

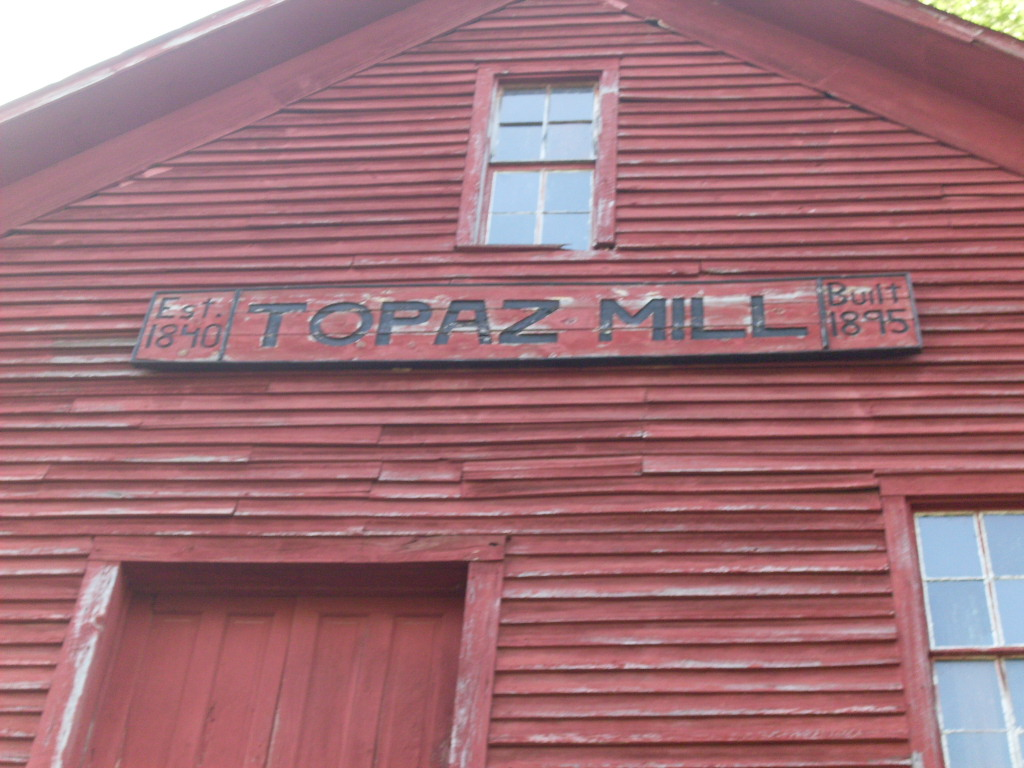
Sign on the old Topaz mill building

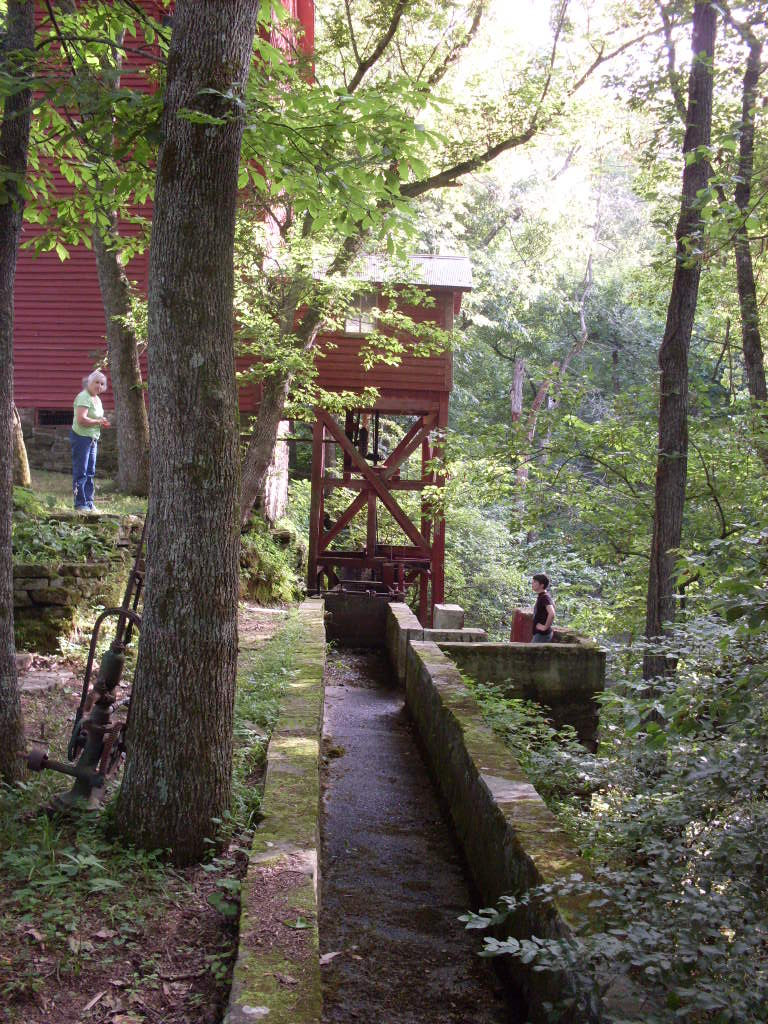
Mill race at Topaz

Topaz is an unincorporated community in northeast Douglas County, Missouri, United States. Topaz is an old mill site located on the North Fork River. Access to the community is from Missouri Route 76 via either Missouri Route EE (from the northwest) or Missouri Route E (from the northeast).

== History ==
A post office called Topaz was established in 1893, and remained in operation until 1943. The community's name most likely is a transfer from a place in a western state.
