= Dogwood, Douglas County, Missouri =

Unincorporated community in Missouri, U.S.

Dogwood, Missouri
- Community
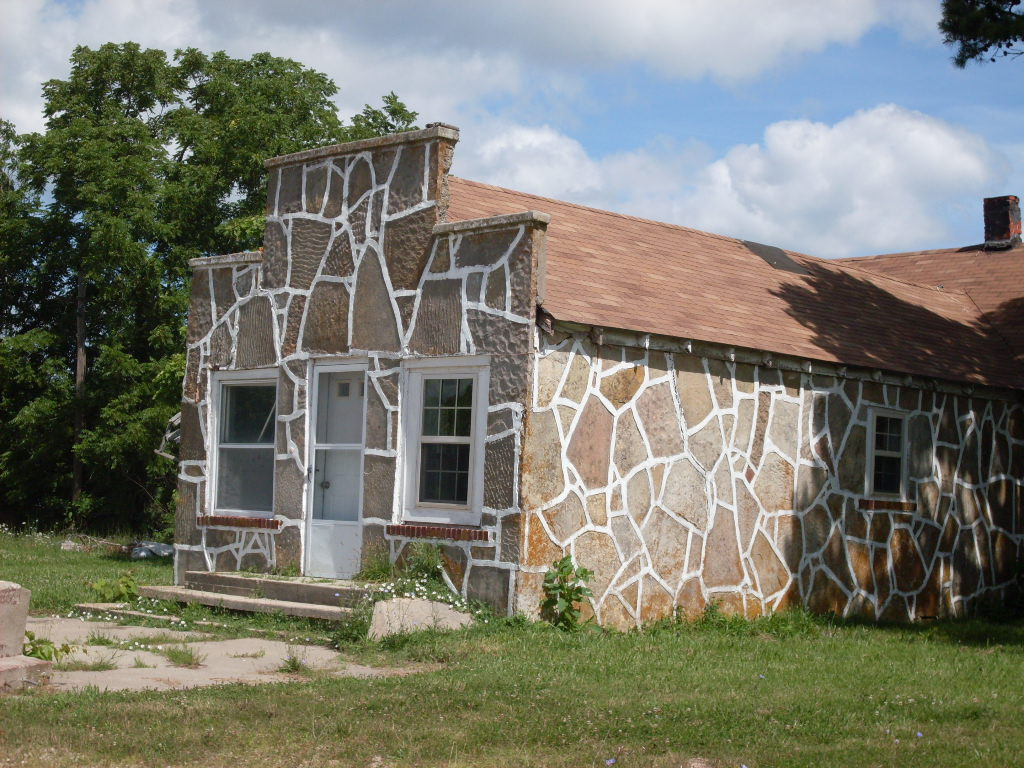
- The old flagstone store building at Dogwood, Missouri

- Location of Dogwood, Missouri
- Coordinates: 37°2′16″N 92°49′52″W
- Country: U. S. A.
- State: Missouri
- County: Douglas County
- Elevation: 510 m (1,680 ft)
- Time zone: UTC-6 (CST)
  - Summer (DST): UTC-5 (CDT)
- GNIS feature ID: 716961

Dogwood is an unincorporated community in northwestern Douglas County, Missouri, United States. It is located on Missouri Route 14, approximately 15.5 miles (24.9 km) northwest of Ava and 8.5 miles (13.7 km) southwest of Seymour. The old store building sits at the intersection of Route 14 with route BB and the Dogwood cemetery is 1,300 feet (400 m) to the west at the intersection of routes 14 and Z.

== History ==
In 1879, a Civil War veteran built a log store building and home near a spring surrounded by dogwoods along the route of the Springfield–Rockbridge portion of the old Salt Road along which salt, lumber and other materials had long been transported between northern Arkansas and Springfield. A post office was established at Dogwood in 1880 and remained in service until 1909. A school was established in 1888 and a log school building was built north of the store in 1891 and was replaced by a frame building in 1910. The school was 0.75 miles (1.21 km) north of the store.

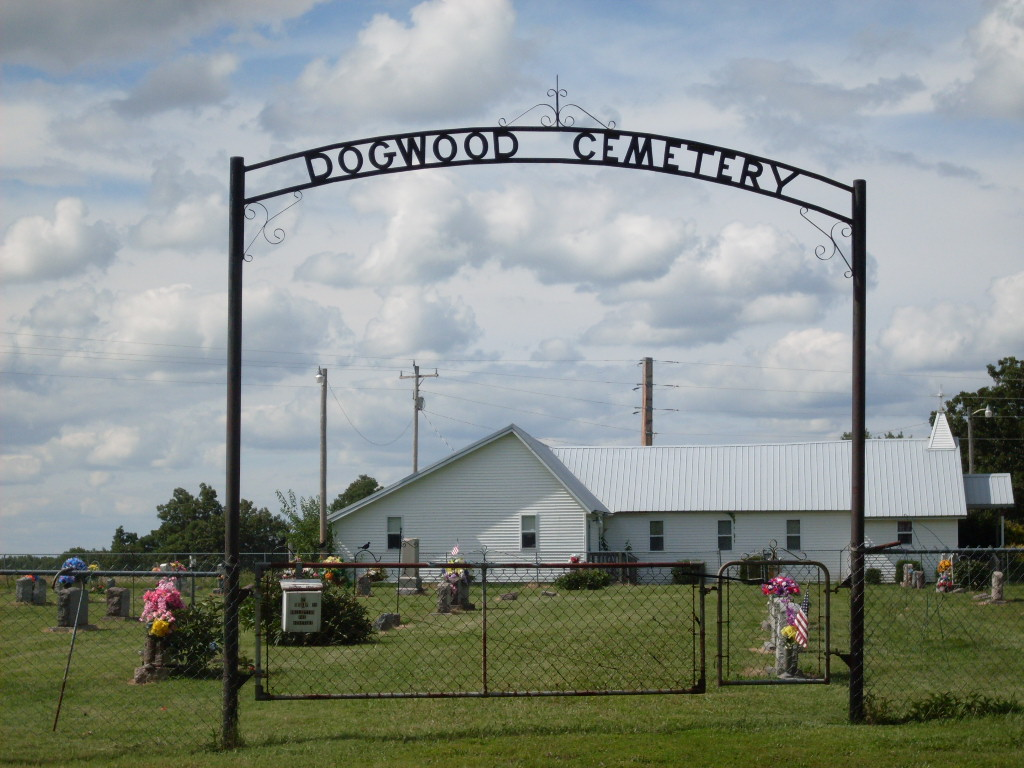
Dogwood cemetery just west of the old store

In 1900, a missionary began holding church services in the school building. In 1905, a church building was erected and land was set aside for a cemetery. In 1932, due to widening and re-routing of Route 14, the church was moved to its current location north of the cemetery. In 1904, a second church was built north of the store and in 1931, a third church was built to the southeast on Route 14.

== Geography ==
Dogwood is located on a ridge at an approximate elevation of 1,680 feet (510 m) on the edge of the Springfield Plateau with the steep valleys of the Beaver Creek valley to the east and the Swan Creek valley to the southwest. The Dogwood fire tower and state hunting area on Tigris Peak is 1.7 miles (2.7 km) to the southeast.
