= Goodhope, Missouri =

Unincorporated community in Missouri, U.S.

Coordinates: 36°54′32″N 92°48′28″W

Goodhope is an unincorporated community in southwestern Douglas County, Missouri, United States. The community lies on the south side of the intersection of Missouri State Routes T and O and just west of the intersection of Route T with Missouri Route 76.

Goodhope had a post office from 1895 until 1923.
