= Douglas County, Missouri =

County in Missouri, United States

- County
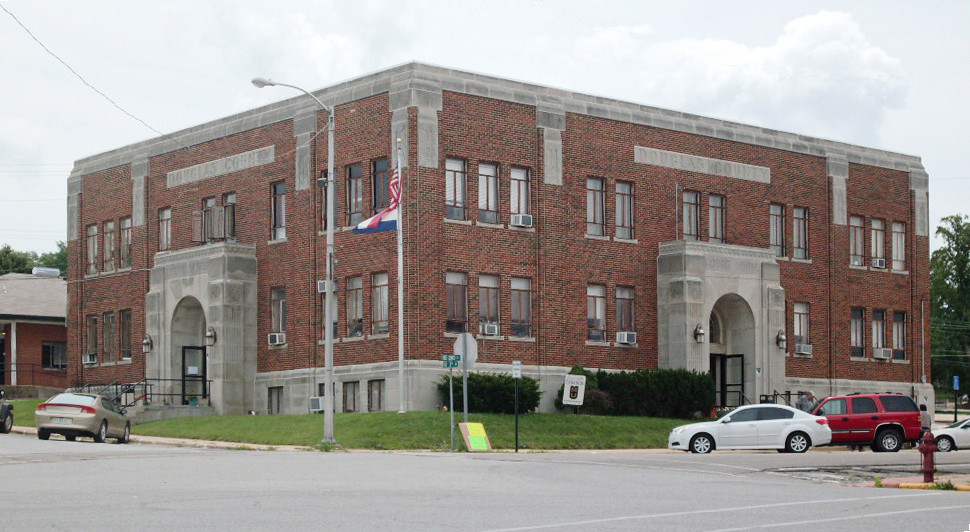
- Douglas County Courthouse in Ava

- Location within the U.S. state of Missouri
- Coordinates: 36°56′N 92°30′W
- Country: United States
- State: Missouri
- Founded: October 19, 1857
- Named for: Stephen A. Douglas
- Seat: Ava
- Largest city: Ava

Area
  - Total: 815 sq mi (2,110 km^{2})
  - Land: 814 sq mi (2,110 km^{2})
  - Water: 1.0 sq mi (2.6 km^{2}) 0.1%

Population (2020)
  - Total: 11,578
  - Estimate (2025): 12,342 ▲
  - Density: 14.2/sq mi (5.49/km^{2})
- Time zone: UTC−6 (Central)
  - Summer (DST): UTC−5 (CDT)
- Congressional district: 8th
- Website: https://www.mocounties.com/douglas-county

Douglas County is a county located in the south-central portion of the U.S. state of Missouri. As of the 2020 census, the population was 11,578. The county seat and only incorporated community is Ava. The county was officially organized on October 19, 1857, and is named after U.S. Senator Stephen A. Douglas (D-Illinois) and later Democratic presidential candidate.

== History ==
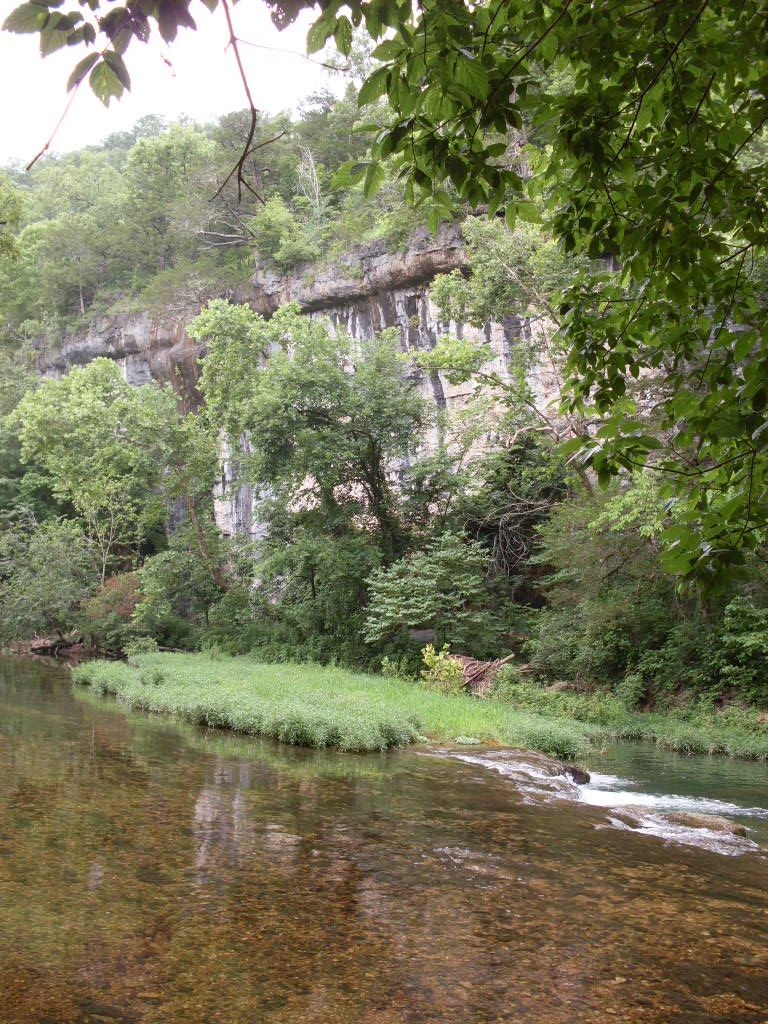
The bluff above Hunter Creek at Vera Cruz

Previously, the county seat was located at Arno, west of Ava. Prior to that, Vera Cruz (formerly called Red Bud) was the county seat. Vera Cruz is located on Bryant Creek, which flows through the middle of the county. The Civil War Battle of Clark's Mill took place near Vera Cruz on November 7, 1862, and resulted in a Confederate victory. After the American Civil War, during a period of general chaos, a group from the western part of the county broke into the Arno courthouse and removed the records back to Vera Cruz. Later in 1871, a new town site was selected, present-day Ava, near the location of the former U.S. Civil War military Post Office, Militia Spring. The location of this new town seemed to satisfy most of the residents of Douglas County to be their point of county government.

== Geography ==
According to the U.S. Census Bureau, the county has a total area of 815 square miles (2,110 km^{2}), of which 814 square miles (2,110 km^{2}) is land and 1.0 square mile (2.6 km^{2}) (0.1%) is water.

=== Adjacent counties ===
- Webster County (northwest)
- Wright County (north)
- Texas County (northeast)
- Howell County (east)
- Ozark County (south)
- Taney County (southwest)
- Christian County (west)

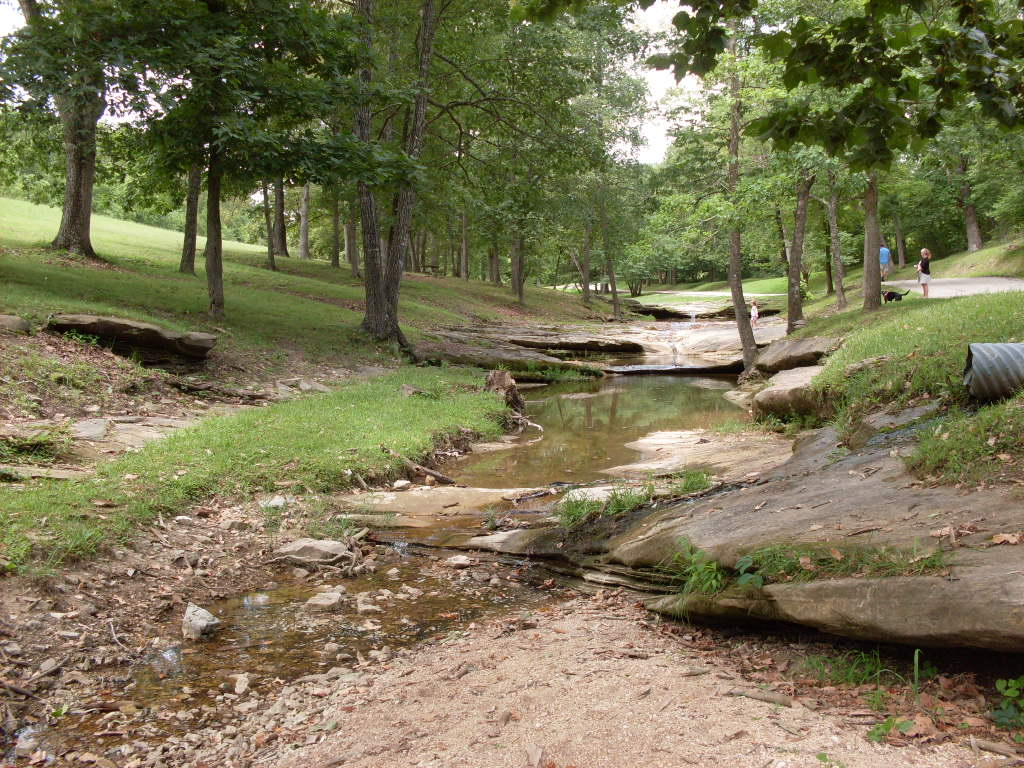
Roadside park in Mill Hollow adjacent to Route 5 north of Ava

=== Major highways ===
- Route 5
- Route 14
- Route 76
- Route 95
- Route 181

=== National protected area ===
- Mark Twain National Forest (part)

== Demographics ==
Historical population
Census	Pop.	Note	%±
1860	2,414		—
1870	3,915		62.2%
1880	7,753		98.0%
1890	14,111		82.0%
1900	16,802		19.1%
1910	16,664		−0.8%
1920	15,436		−7.4%
1930	13,959		−9.6%
1940	15,600		11.8%
1950	12,638		−19.0%
1960	9,653		−23.6%
1970	9,268		−4.0%
1980	11,594		25.1%
1990	11,876		2.4%
2000	13,084		10.2%
2010	13,684		4.6%
2020	11,578		−15.4%
2025 (est.)	12,342	▲	6.6%
U.S. Decennial Census; 1790-1960 1900-1990; 1990-2000 2010-2015

=== Racial and ethnic composition ===
Douglas County, Missouri – Racial and ethnic composition Note: the US Census treats Hispanic/Latino as an ethnic category. This table excludes Latinos from the racial categories and assigns them to a separate category. Hispanics/Latinos may be of any race.
Race / Ethnicity (NH = Non-Hispanic)	Pop 1980	Pop 1990	Pop 2000	Pop 2010	Pop 2020	% 1980	% 1990	% 2000	% 2010	% 2020
White alone (NH)	11,446	11,680	12,607	13,218	10,602	98.72%	98.35%	96.35%	96.59%	91.57%
Black or African American alone (NH)	4	3	14	28	35	0.03%	0.03%	0.11%	0.20%	0.30%
Native American or Alaska Native alone (NH)	58	88	121	74	74	0.50%	0.74%	0.92%	0.54%	0.64%
Asian alone (NH)	12	15	28	30	24	0.10%	0.13%	0.21%	0.22%	0.21%
Native Hawaiian or Pacific Islander alone (NH)	x	x	0	0	0	x	x	0.00%	0.00%	0.00%
Other race alone (NH)	8	0	1	3	28	0.07%	0.00%	0.01%	0.02%	0.24%
Mixed race or Multiracial (NH)	x	x	203	221	576	x	x	1.55%	1.62%	4.97%
Hispanic or Latino (any race)	66	90	110	110	239	0.57%	0.76%	0.84%	0.80%	2.06%
Total	11,594	11,876	13,084	13,684	11,578	100.00%	100.00%	100.00%	100.00%	100.00%

=== 2020 census ===
As of the 2020 census, the county had a population of 11,578. The median age was 47.8 years. 21.6% of residents were under the age of 18 and 26.3% of residents were 65 years of age or older. For every 100 females there were 99.3 males, and for every 100 females age 18 and over there were 97.2 males age 18 and over.

The racial makeup of the county was 92.2% White, 0.3% Black or African American, 0.7% American Indian and Alaska Native, 0.2% Asian, 0.0% Native Hawaiian and Pacific Islander, 0.5% from some other race, and 6.0% from two or more races. Hispanic or Latino residents of any race comprised 2.1% of the population.

0.0% of residents lived in urban areas, while 100.0% lived in rural areas.

There were 4,635 households in the county, of which 26.1% had children under the age of 18 living with them and 21.9% had a female householder with no spouse or partner present. About 26.4% of all households were made up of individuals and 14.8% had someone living alone who was 65 years of age or older.

There were 5,346 housing units, of which 13.3% were vacant. Among occupied housing units, 79.2% were owner-occupied and 20.8% were renter-occupied. The homeowner vacancy rate was 2.0% and the rental vacancy rate was 8.4%.

=== 2000 census ===
As of the census of 2000, there were 13,084 people, 5,201 households, and 3,671 families residing in the county. The population density was 16 people per square mile (6.2 people/km^{2}). There were 5,919 housing units at an average density of 7 units per square mile (2.7/km^{2}). The racial makeup of the county was 96.86% White, 0.11% Black or African American, 0.95% Native American, 0.21% Asian, 0.02% Pacific Islander, 0.17% from other races, and 1.69% from two or more races. Approximately 0.84% of the population were Hispanic or Latino of any race. Among the major first ancestries reported in Douglas County are 31.3% American, 13.2% English, 12.3% German, and 9.7% Irish.

There were 5,201 households, out of which 30.10% had children under the age of 18 living with them, 60.00% were married couples living together, 7.20% had a female householder with no husband present, and 29.40% were non-families. 26.10% of all households were made up of individuals, and 13.00% had someone living alone who was 65 years of age or older. The average household size was 2.49 and the average family size was 2.99.

In the county, the population was spread out, with 25.80% under the age of 18, 7.00% from 18 to 24, 24.50% from 25 to 44, 25.60% from 45 to 64, and 17.10% who were 65 years of age or older. The median age was 40 years. For every 100 females there were 96.60 males. For every 100 females age 18 and over, there were 93.30 males.

The median income for a household in the county was $31,335, and the median income for a family was $36,648. Males had a median income of $22,706 versus $17,060 for females. The per capita income for the county was $16,710. About 12.90% of families and 17.50% of the population were below the poverty line, including 19.80% of those under age 18 and 18.20% of those age 65 or over.

=== Religion ===
According to the Association of Religion Data Archives County Membership Report (2000), Douglas County is a part of the Bible Belt with evangelical Protestantism being the majority religion. The most predominant denominations among residents in Douglas County who adhere to a religion are Southern Baptists (22.95%), Church of the Nazarene (16.28%), and Mormons (13.70%).

Established in 1950, a Trappist monastery, Assumption Abbey, can be found nestled on 3,000 acres in the Ozark hills. An associated Friary, Our Lady of the Angels, is located nearby. Both facilities have overnight rooms available to be utilized by the public for a small fee in order to find a place of solace and quiet reflection.

== Education ==
Of adults 25 years of age and older in Douglas County, 69.7% possess a high school diploma or higher while 9.9% hold a bachelor's degree or higher as their highest educational attainment.

=== Public schools ===
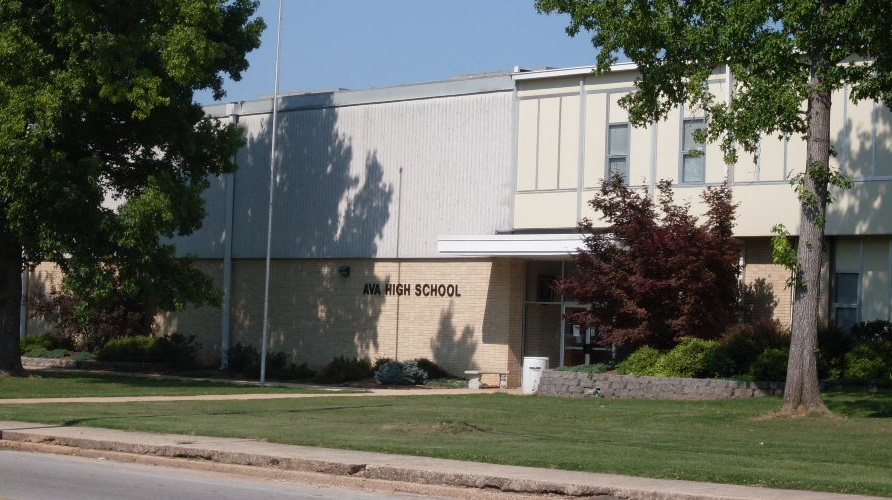
Ava High School in Ava, Missouri

- Ava R-I School District - Ava
  - Ava Elementary School (PK-04)
  - Ava Middle School (05-08)
  - Ava High School (09-12)
- Plainview R8 School District - Goodhope, Missouri
  - Plainview Elementary School (K-08) - West of Ava
- Skyline R2 School District - Norwood, Missouri
  - Skyline Elementary (K-08)

=== Private schools ===
- Mt. Zion Bible Academy - Ava - (PK-12) - Church of God

=== Public libraries ===
- Douglas County Public Library

== Politics ==
=== Local ===
Douglas County, Missouri

Elected countywide officials
Assessor	Alicia Miller-Degase	Republican
Circuit Clerk	Kim Hathcock	Republican
County Clerk	Karry Davis	Republican
Collector	Laura Stillings	Republican
Commissioner (presiding)	Larry Pueppke	Republican
Commissioner (district 1)	Richard Mitchell	Republican
Commissioner (district 2)	Danny Dry	Republican
Coroner	Rick Miller	Republican
Prosecuting Attorney	Roger Wall	Republican
Public Administrator	Linda Coonts	Republican
Recorder	Tina Boyd	Republican
Sheriff	Chris Degase	Republican
Surveyor	Andy Daniels	Democratic
Treasurer	Theresa Miller	Republican

The Republican party holds most of the elected positions in the county, though this has not always been the case; in the early 1900s, Douglas County was primarily Democratic.

=== State ===
Past Gubernatorial Elections Results
Year	Republican	Democratic	Third Parties
2020	82.81% 5,773	15.01% 1,046	2.18% 152
2016	72.34% 4,818	24.13% 1,607	3.53% 235
2012	59.43% 3,869	36.97% 2,407	3.59% 234
2008	45.27% 3,014	48.95% 3,259	5.78% 385
2004	70.08% 4,412	28.40% 1,788	1.52% 96
2000	63.53% 3,317	34.73% 1,813	1.74% 91
1996	61.03% 3,145	36.06% 1,858	2.91% 150
1992	57.14% 3,203	42.86% 2,403	0.00% 0
1988	74.63% 3,671	24.90% 1,225	0.47% 23
1984	75.00% 3,846	25.00% 1,282	0.00% 0
1980	60.76% 3,151	38.78% 2,011	0.46% 24
1976	63.51% 2,924	36.21% 1,667	0.28% 13
1972	67.00% 3,350	32.90% 1,645	0.10% 5
1968	59.75% 2,420	40.25% 1,630	0.00% 0
1964	58.64% 2,217	41.16% 1,551	0.00% 0
1960	73.68% 3,242	26.32% 1,158	0.00% 0

All of Douglas County is a part of Missouri's 155th district

Missouri House of Representatives — District 155 — Douglas County (2016)
Party	Candidate	Votes	%	±%
Republican	Lyle Rowland	5,641	100.00%	

Missouri House of Representatives — District 155 — Douglas County (2014)
Party	Candidate	Votes	%	±%
Republican	Lyle Rowland	2,424	100.00%	

Missouri House of Representatives — District 155 — Douglas County (2012)
Party	Candidate	Votes	%	±%
Republican	Lyle Rowland	5,360	100.00%	

All of Douglas County is a part of Missouri's 33rd district.

Missouri Senate — District 33 — Douglas County (2016)
Party	Candidate	Votes	%	±%
Republican	Mike Cunningham	5,713	100.00%	

Missouri Senate — District 33 — Douglas County (2012)
Party	Candidate	Votes	%	±%
Republican	Mike Cunningham	5,478	100.00%	

=== Federal ===
Missouri's two U.S. senators are Republicans Josh Hawley and Eric Schmitt

U.S. Senate — Missouri — Douglas County (2016)
Party	Candidate	Votes	%	±%
Republican	Roy Blunt	4,753	71.31%	+17.76
Democratic	Jason Kander	1,556	23.35%	−14.71
Libertarian	Jonathan Dine	174	2.61%	−5.78
Green	Johnathan McFarland	81	1.22%	+1.22
Constitution	Fred Ryman	101	1.52%	+1.52

U.S. Senate — Missouri — Douglas County (2012)
Party	Candidate	Votes	%	±%
Republican	W. Todd Akin	3,498	53.55%	
Democratic	Claire McCaskill	2,486	38.06%	
Libertarian	Jonathan Dine	548	8.39%	

All of Douglas County is included in Missouri's 8th congressional district and is currently represented by Jason T. Smith of Salem in the U.S. House of Representatives. Smith won a special election on Tuesday, June 4, 2013, to complete the remaining term of former U.S. Representative Jo Ann Emerson of Cape Girardeau. Emerson announced her resignation a month after being reelected with over 70 percent of the vote in the district. She resigned to become CEO of the National Rural Electric Cooperative.

U.S. House of Representatives — Missouri's 8th Congressional District — Douglas County (2016)
Party	Candidate	Votes	%	±%
Republican	Jason T. Smith	5,313	82.31%	+7.76
Democratic	Dave Cowell	944	14.62%	−1.07
Libertarian	Jonathan Shell	198	3.07%	+0.59

U.S. House of Representatives — Missouri's 8th Congressional District — Douglas County (2014)
Party	Candidate	Votes	%	±%
Republican	Jason T. Smith	2,133	74.55%	−0.67
Democratic	Barbara Stocker	449	15.69%	−2.54
Libertarian	Rick Vandeven	71	2.48%	+0.84
Constitution	Doug Enyart	64	2.24%	−2.67
Independent	Terry Hampton	144	5.03%	+5.03

U.S. House of Representatives — Missouri's 8th Congressional District — Special Election — Douglas County (2013)
Party	Candidate	Votes	%	±%
Republican	Jason T. Smith	1,011	75.22%	−2.20
Democratic	Steve Hodges	245	18.23%	+0.75
Libertarian	Bill Slantz	22	1.64%	−3.45
Constitution	Doug Enyart	66	4.91%	+4.91

U.S. House of Representatives — Missouri's 8th Congressional District — Douglas County (2012)
Party	Candidate	Votes	%	±%
Republican	Jo Ann Emerson	4,942	77.42%	
Democratic	Jack Rushin	1,116	17.48%	
Libertarian	Rick Vandeven	325	5.09%	

==== Political culture ====
United States presidential election results for Douglas County, Missouri
Year	Republican		Democratic		Third party(ies)	
Year	No.	%	No.	%	No.	%
1888	1,306	54.03%	477	19.74%	634	26.23%
1892	1,309	53.23%	328	13.34%	822	33.43%
1896	1,598	48.32%	1,700	51.41%	9	0.27%
1900	1,705	57.72%	858	29.05%	391	13.24%
1904	1,830	71.91%	437	17.17%	278	10.92%
1908	1,922	64.84%	699	23.58%	343	11.57%
1912	855	30.56%	566	20.23%	1,377	49.21%
1916	1,730	65.26%	737	27.80%	184	6.94%
1920	3,327	82.09%	577	14.24%	149	3.68%
1924	2,617	69.16%	909	24.02%	258	6.82%
1928	3,758	84.00%	681	15.22%	35	0.78%
1932	2,362	53.50%	1,922	43.53%	131	2.97%
1936	4,031	65.15%	2,118	34.23%	38	0.61%
1940	4,870	77.90%	1,350	21.59%	32	0.51%
1944	3,570	82.45%	746	17.23%	14	0.32%
1948	2,734	69.85%	1,163	29.71%	17	0.43%
1952	4,051	81.49%	909	18.29%	11	0.22%
1956	2,910	71.98%	1,133	28.02%	0	0.00%
1960	3,611	78.08%	1,014	21.92%	0	0.00%
1964	2,280	58.87%	1,593	41.13%	0	0.00%
1968	2,836	67.11%	978	23.14%	412	9.75%
1972	3,773	75.73%	1,209	24.27%	0	0.00%
1976	2,652	56.82%	1,981	42.45%	34	0.73%
1980	3,440	65.50%	1,677	31.93%	135	2.57%
1984	3,662	70.45%	1,536	29.55%	0	0.00%
1988	3,225	64.85%	1,735	34.89%	13	0.26%
1992	2,569	44.35%	2,126	36.71%	1,097	18.94%
1996	2,601	50.17%	1,744	33.64%	839	16.18%
2000	3,599	68.15%	1,546	29.27%	136	2.58%
2004	4,498	71.09%	1,741	27.52%	88	1.39%
2008	4,405	65.63%	2,140	31.88%	167	2.49%
2012	4,649	70.90%	1,710	26.08%	198	3.02%
2016	5,486	82.30%	984	14.76%	196	2.94%
2020	5,898	84.26%	1,016	14.51%	86	1.23%
2024	6,242	85.64%	996	13.66%	51	0.70%

Douglas County is, like most other counties located in the GOP bastion of Southwest Missouri, a Republican stronghold in presidential elections. No Democratic presidential nominee has won Douglas County since William Jennings Bryan in 1896, and no other nominee has done so since 1864. While statewide elections tend to be closer throughout the state, this is not the case in Douglas County, as no Democratic gubernatorial nominee had won the county in over 50 years until Governor Jay Nixon's narrow pluralistic win in 2008. Furthermore, with all local elected offices being held by Republicans, voters have kept the traditionally Republican dominance alive in Douglas County.

Like most rural areas throughout the Bible Belt in Southwest Missouri, voters in Douglas County traditionally adhere to socially and culturally conservative principles which tend to strongly influence their Republican leanings. In 2004, Missourians voted on a constitutional amendment to define marriage as the union between a man and a woman—it overwhelmingly passed Douglas County with 85.78% of the vote. The initiative passed the state with 71% of support from voters as Missouri became the first state to ban same-sex marriage. In 2006, Missourians voted on a constitutional amendment to fund and legalize embryonic stem cell research in the state—it failed in Douglas County with 59.36% voting against the measure. The initiative narrowly passed the state with 51% of support from voters as Missouri became one of the first states in the nation to approve embryonic stem cell research. Despite Douglas County's longstanding tradition of supporting socially conservative platforms, voters in the county have a penchant for advancing populist causes like increasing the minimum wage. In 2006, Missourians voted on a proposition (Proposition B) to increase the minimum wage in the state to $6.50 an hour—it passed Douglas County with 71.97% of the vote. The proposition strongly passed every single county in Missouri with 78.99% voting in favor as the minimum wage was increased to $6.50 an hour in the state. During the same election, voters in five other states also strongly approved increases in the minimum wage.

== Communities ==
The county has only one incorporated town: Ava, the county seat. Also, a number of current and historic communities are present:

- Ann
- Arden
- Arno
- Ava
- Basher
- Bertha
- Biggs
- Blanche
- Brushyknob
- Bryant
- Buckhart
- Champion
- Cheney
- Coldspring
- Cross Roads
- Denlow
- Depew
- Dogwood
- Drury
- Evans
- Fielden
- Filer
- Gentryville
- Girdner
- Goodhope
- Granada
- Hebron
- Hest
- Jackson Mill
- Merritt
- Midway
- Mount Zion
- Olathia
- Ongo
- Pansy
- Prior
- Red Bank
- Richville
- Rippee
- Rome
- Roosevelt
- Roy
- Smallett
- Squires
- Sweden
- Tigris
- Topaz
- Vanzant
- Vera Cruz
- Witty

== See also ==
- National Register of Historic Places listings in Douglas County, Missouri
