= Ava, Missouri =

City in Missouri, U.S.

- City
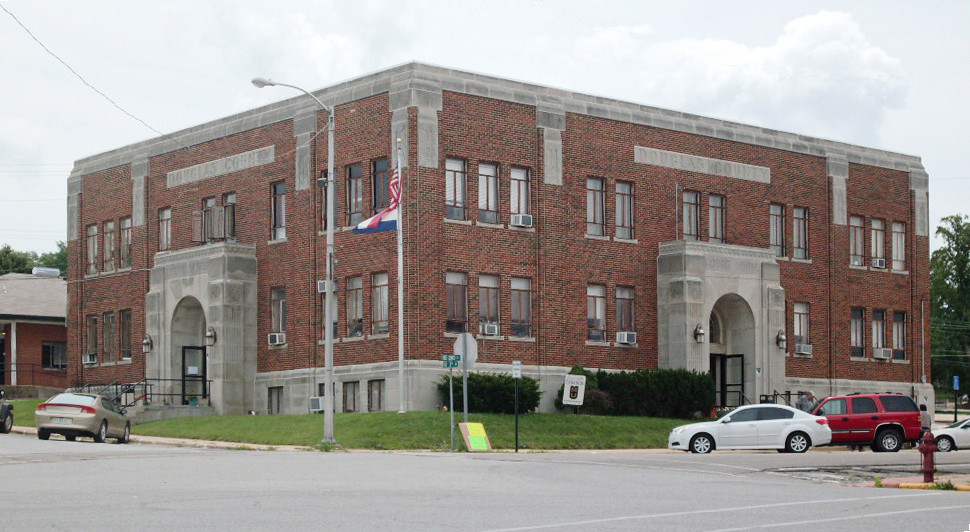
- Douglas County court house on the southeast corner of the Ava square

- Location of Ava, Missouri
- Coordinates: 36°57′17″N 92°39′59″W
- Country: United States
- State: Missouri
- County: Douglas

Government
  - Mayor: Kirk Pueppke

Area
  - Total: 3.33 sq mi (8.62 km^{2})
  - Land: 3.32 sq mi (8.60 km^{2})
  - Water: 0.0039 sq mi (0.01 km^{2})
- Elevation: 1,270 ft (390 m)

Population (2020)
  - Total: 2,894
  - Density: 871.1/sq mi (336.34/km^{2})
- Time zone: UTC-6 (Central (CST))
  - Summer (DST): UTC-5 (CDT)
- ZIP code: 65608
- Area codes: 417
- FIPS code: 29-02674
- GNIS feature ID: 2394040
- Website: avamissouri.org

Ava is a city in and the county seat of Douglas County, Missouri, United States, that is the only incorporated city in the county. The population was 2,894 at the 2020 census. The city was founded in 1871. It was renamed Ava in 1881, the town's original name having been Militia Springs.

== Geography ==
Ava is located in the southern portion of the Missouri Ozarks within the southern escarpment of the Salem Plateau. The lakes of the White River basin of northern Arkansas and southern Missouri lie to the south. The town is at the intersection of Missouri highways 5, 14 and 76. Mansfield is 13 miles to the north and Gainesville is approximately 30 miles south. Elevation of the town varies from 1,150 to 1,400 feet (350 to 430 m).

According to the United States Census Bureau, the city has a total area of 3.30 square miles (8.55 km^{2}), all land.

Ava is home to co-owned radio stations KKOZ 1430 AM and KKOZ 92.1 FM.

== History ==
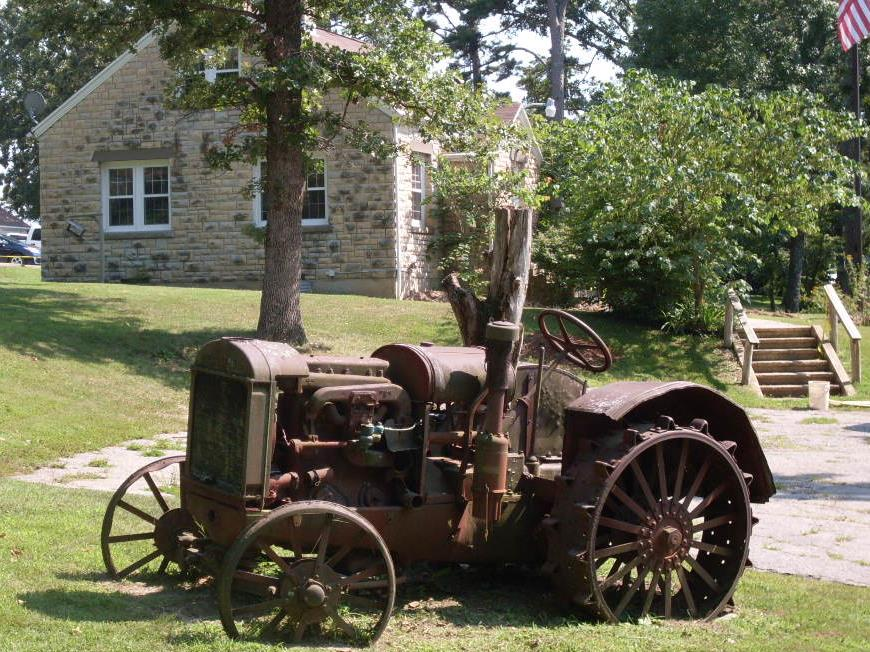
Old tractor displayed by the Ava Ranger Station Historic District

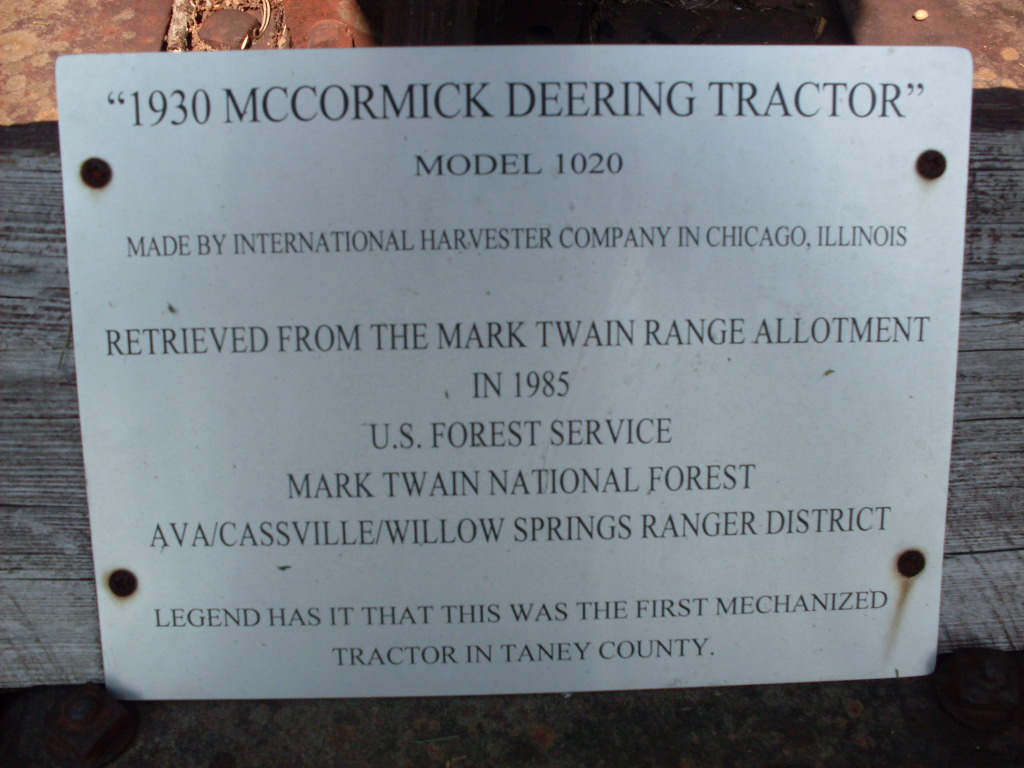
Plaque attached to the old tractor at the Ava ranger station

The area was settled during the 1830s and Douglas County was incorporated in 1857, with Vera Cruz as county seat. In 1864, the town of Militia Springs was founded and became the new county seat in 1870. The town was platted (Note: Wiktionary: plat (verb): To create a plat (formal plan of property lines), to lay out streets and building lots; to map.) in 1871 and renamed Ava in 1881, although not incorporated until 1908. Militia Springs was the location of an encampment of Union soldiers or Missouri Militia during the American Civil War.

During and after the Civil War, a dispute was ongoing regarding the county seat between Vera Cruz to the east and Arno to the west. In 1871, the citizens of Militia Springs built a court house building and moved the records there as a compromise. However, the building was burned and then rebuilt of hand hewn timbers rather than logs and re-opened in January 1873. The court house was burned again in 1886 and replaced in 1888. The current court house on the southeast corner of the town square was constructed in 1937.

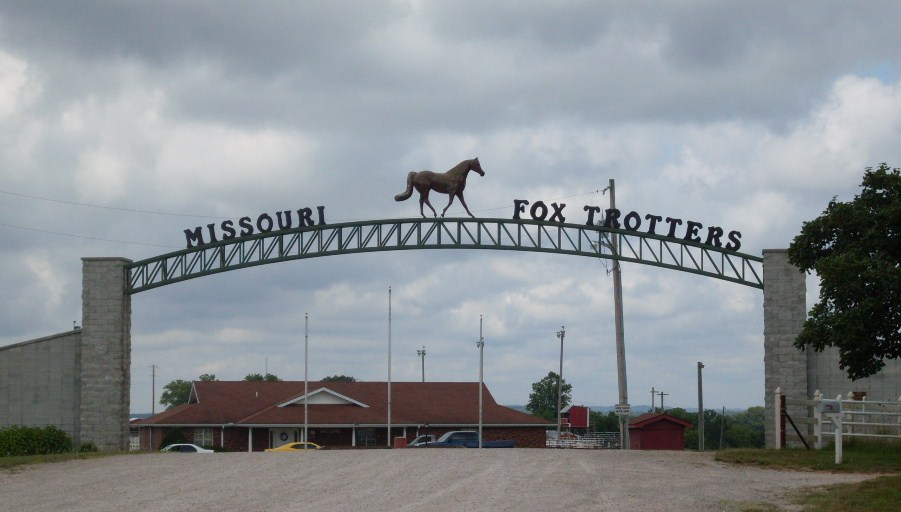
Entrance to the Missouri Fox Trotter showground north of Ava, Missouri

In 1910 the Kansas City, Ozark and Southern Railroad was extended from Mansfield south to Ava to serve the growing agricultural and lumbering industries of Douglas County. The railroad remained in operation until 1935.

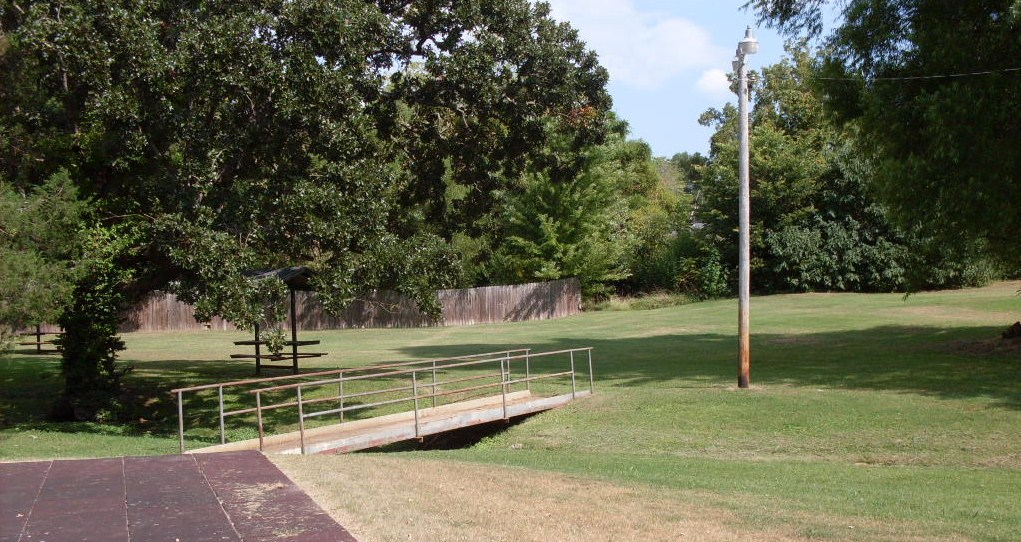
Footbridge over Prairie Creek in Militia Springs Park

A city park, Militia Springs Park, was established in 2004 along Prairie Creek on North Spring Street. The location is the approximate site of the Civil War era military encampment. It has a play area and pavilion.

The Missouri Fox Trotter association was organized in Ava in 1948 and the annual shows are held at the association's property, just north of Ava.

The Ava Ranger Station Historic District is listed in the National Register of Historic Places.

== Demographics ==
Historical population
Census	Pop.	Note	%±
1880	134		—
1890	221		64.9%
1910	713		—
1920	845		18.5%
1930	1,041		23.2%
1940	1,393		33.8%
1950	1,611		15.6%
1960	1,581		−1.9%
1970	2,504		58.4%
1980	2,761		10.3%
1990	2,938		6.4%
2000	3,021		2.8%
2010	2,993		−0.9%
2020	2,894		−3.3%
U.S. Decennial Census

=== 2020 census ===
As of the 2020 census, Ava had a population of 2,894. The median age was 39.7 years. 23.4% of residents were under the age of 18 and 24.9% of residents were 65 years of age or older. For every 100 females there were 88.9 males, and for every 100 females age 18 and over there were 84.9 males age 18 and over.

0.0% of residents lived in urban areas, while 100.0% lived in rural areas.

There were 1,194 households in Ava, of which 29.4% had children under the age of 18 living in them. Of all households, 39.7% were married-couple households, 17.1% were households with a male householder and no spouse or partner present, and 35.3% were households with a female householder and no spouse or partner present. About 35.0% of all households were made up of individuals and 21.3% had someone living alone who was 65 years of age or older.

There were 1,400 housing units, of which 14.7% were vacant. The homeowner vacancy rate was 6.3% and the rental vacancy rate was 7.9%.

Racial composition as of the 2020 census
Race	Number	Percent
White	2,591	89.5%
Black or African American	16	0.6%
American Indian and Alaska Native	20	0.7%
Asian	13	0.4%
Native Hawaiian and Other Pacific Islander	1	0.0%
Some other race	25	0.9%
Two or more races	228	7.9%
Hispanic or Latino (of any race)	65	2.2%

=== 2010 census ===
As of the census of 2010, there were 2,993 people, 1,296 households, and 753 families living in the city. The population density was 907.0 inhabitants per square mile (350.2/km^{2}). There were 1,494 housing units at an average density of 452.7 per square mile (174.8/km^{2}). The racial makeup of the city was 97.6% White, 0.1% African American, 0.5% Native American, 0.2% Asian, 0.2% from other races, and 1.4% from two or more races. Hispanic or Latino of any race were 1.0% of the population.

There were 1,296 households, of which 28.4% had children under the age of 18 living with them, 38.1% were married couples living together, 15.4% had a female householder with no husband present, 4.6% had a male householder with no wife present, and 41.9% were non-families. 35.9% of all households were made up of individuals, and 20.2% had someone living alone who was 65 years of age or older. The average household size was 2.22 and the average family size was 2.86.

The median age in the city was 40.8 years. 22.8% of residents were under the age of 18; 9.4% were between the ages of 18 and 24; 22.2% were from 25 to 44; 22.6% were from 45 to 64; and 22.9% were 65 years of age or older. The gender makeup of the city was 44.4% male and 55.6% female.

=== 2000 census ===
As of the census of 2000, there were 3,021 people, 1,350 households, and 764 families living in the city. The population density was 973.0 inhabitants per square mile (375.7/km^{2}). There were 1,493 housing units at an average density of 480.9 per square mile (185.7/km^{2}). The racial makeup of the city was 96.79% White, 0.13% African American, 0.66% Native American, 0.43% Asian, 0.03% Pacific Islander, 0.26% from other races, and 1.69% from two or more races. Hispanic or Latino of any race were 1.36% of the population.

There were 1,350 households, out of which 27.3% had children under the age of 18 living with them, 43.0% were married couples living together, 10.5% had a female householder with no husband present, and 43.4% were non-families. 39.3% of all households were made up of individuals, and 23.3% had someone living alone who was 65 years of age or older. The average household size was 2.21 and the average family size was 2.96.

In the city, the population was spread out, with 25.4% under the age of 18, 8.3% from 18 to 24, 24.0% from 25 to 44, 19.3% from 45 to 64, and 23.0% who were 65 years of age or older. The median age was 38 years. For every 100 females, there were 79.2 males. For every 100 females age 18 and over, there were 73.1 males.

The median income for a household in the city was $22,331, and the median income for a family was $28,228. Males had a median income of $25,865 versus $16,324 for females. The per capita income for the city was $13,307. About 16.0% of families and 21.7% of the population were below the poverty line, including 27.3% of those under age 18 and 25.8% of those age 65 or over.

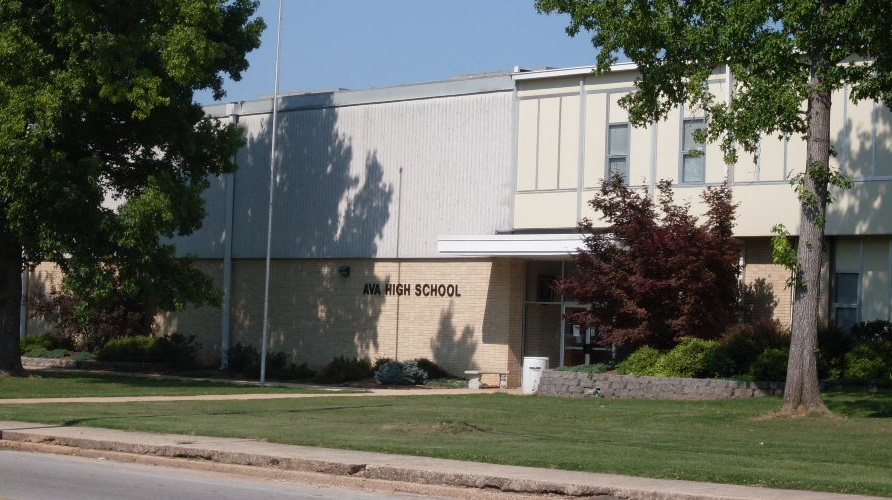
The high school building in Ava

== Education ==
Ava R-I School District operates one elementary school, one middle school, and Ava High School.

The town has a lending library, the Douglas County Public Library.

== Notable person ==
- Marilyn Cade (1947–2020) - activist and cofounder of ICANN

== See also ==
- List of cities in Missouri
