= Pond Fork =

Pond Fork Pond Fork Creek

Location
- Country: United States
- State: Missouri
- Region: Ozark County

Physical characteristics
- Source
  - coordinates: 36°44′42″N 92°45′07″W
- Mouth
  - coordinates: 36°35′09″N 92°39′04″W
  - elevation: 653 ft (199 m)

Pond Fork (also called Pondfork Creek) is a stream in western Ozark County, Missouri. Pond Fork has its source in the northwest corner of Ozark County and flows south-southeast passing under Missouri Route 95 between Thornfield and Longrun to its mouth at the northern branch of Bull Shoals Lake just northeast of Theodosia. Prior to the filling of Bull Shoals, Pond Fork was a tributary to the Little North Fork White River which it joined just north of Theodosia.

Pond Fork was named for the fact the creek is fed from a pond in its headwaters.

== See also ==
- List of rivers of Missouri
- Pondfork, Missouri
