= Pine Creek (Bryant Creek tributary) =

Location
- Country: United States
- State: Missouri
- Region: Ozark County

Physical characteristics
- Source
  - coordinates: 36°43′30″N 92°27′33″W
  - elevation: 1,360 ft (410 m)
- Mouth
  - coordinates: 36°37′56″N 92°18′30″W
  - elevation: 581 ft (177 m)

Pine Creek is a stream in Ozark County in the Ozarks of south central Missouri. The stream is a tributary of Bryant Creek.

The stream headwaters arise at the northern edge of the Caney Mountain Conservation Area on the northeast side of Preston Flat Ridge. The source area is about 2.5 miles east of the community of Romance and eight miles north of Gainesville. From the source the stream flows east-southeast passing under Route N and Missouri Route 181 at the community of Zanoni. The stream continues southeast to south passing west of Luna and gaining the tributary of Caney Creek before reaching its confluence with Bryant Creek northwest of Tecumseh.
