= Barren Fork (Little North Fork White River tributary) =

Barren Fork Barren Fork Creek

Location
- Country: United States
- State: Missouri
- Region: Ozark County

Physical characteristics
- Source
  - coordinates: 36°41′44″N 92°26′17″W
  - elevation: 1,200 ft (370 m)
- Mouth
  - coordinates: 36°37′13″N 92°37′19″W
  - elevation: 676 ft (206 m)

Barren Fork is a stream in Ozark County, Missouri. It is a tributary of the Little North Fork White River. The headwaters of the stream are along the west side of the Caney Mountain Conservation Area north of Gainesville. The stream flows west past Willhoit and under Missouri Route 5 continuing into the Mark Twain National Forest south of Nottinghill to its confluence with the Little North Fork White River north of Isabella. The confluence is within the waters of Bull Shoals Lake and the normal lake level is at 695 feet.

A variant name is "Barren Fork Creek". The creek is so named on account of the relatively few trees which lined its banks.

== See also ==
- List of rivers of Missouri
