= Dillia, Missouri =

Extinct town in the American state of Missouri

Coordinates: 36°37′15″N 92°36′34″W

Dillia is an extinct town in Ozark County, in the U.S. state of Missouri. The GNIS classifies it as a populated place. However, the location coordinates place it within the waters of Bull Shoals Lake on the Barren Fork Branch of the Little North Fork White River, approximately four miles south-southeast of the Hammond mill site and four miles northeast of Theodosia.

A post office called Dillia was established in 1891, and remained in operation until 1912. The community, also spelled "Dellia", was named after Dellia Kyle, the daughter of an early settler.
