= Caney Creek (Pine Creek tributary) =

Location
- Country: United States
- State: Missouri
- Region: Ozark County

Physical characteristics
- Source
  - coordinates: 36°42′08″N 92°26′41″W
  - elevation: 1,300 ft (400 m)
- Mouth
  - coordinates: 36°38′42″N 92°19′02″W
  - elevation: 600 ft (180 m)

Caney Creek is a stream in Ozark County in the Ozarks of south central Missouri. The stream is a tributary of Pine Creek.

The stream headwaters arise on Preston Flat Ridge in the Caney Mountain Conservation Area about six miles north of Gainesville. The stream flows to the southeast passing Caney Mountain, which was named for the creek, and under Missouri Route 181 southwest of Zanoni and continues on to the southeast to its confluence with Pine Creek southwest of the community of Luna and one mile northwest of the confluence of Pine Creek with Bryant Creek northwest of Tecumseh.
