= Little North Fork White River =

Little North Fork White River Little Fork, Little North Fork River

Location
- Country: United States
- State: Missouri and Arkansas
- Region: Douglas and Ozark counties in Missouri and Marion County in Arkansas

Physical characteristics
- Source
  - coordinates: 36°49′20″N 92°39′27″W
- Mouth
  - coordinates: 36°27′22″N 92°38′03″W
  - elevation: 653 ft (199 m)

The Little North Fork White River is a stream in southern Douglas and Ozark counties of the Ozarks of southern Missouri and entering northern Marion County, Arkansas within the Bull Shoals Reservoir.

The stream headwaters are in south central Douglas County about three miles southwest of Squires. The stream flows south into northwest Ozark County and past the community of Toledo. Further south it flows parallel to Missouri Route JJ and under Missouri Route 95 at Thornfield. It continues past the Hammond mill site and on into a northern arm of Bull Shoals between Theodosia and Isabella. The stream continues as part of Bull Shoals past Pontiac and into Arkansas to the west of Oakland and Arkansas Highway 202.

Variant or historical names include Little Fork, Little North Fork, and Little North Fork River.
