= Sundown, Missouri =

Unincorporated community in Missouri, U.S.

- Unincorporated community and census-designated place
- Location of Sundown, Missouri
- Coordinates: 36°33′59″N 92°38′13″W
- Country: United States
- State: Missouri
- County: Ozark

Area
  - Total: 1.86 sq mi (4.83 km^{2})
  - Land: 1.46 sq mi (3.78 km^{2})
  - Water: 0.41 sq mi (1.05 km^{2})
- Elevation: 771 ft (235 m)

Population (2020)
  - Total: 62
  - Density: 42.4/sq mi (16.39/km^{2})
- Time zone: UTC-6 (Central (CST))
  - Summer (DST): UTC-5 (CDT)
- FIPS code: 29-71628
- GNIS ID: 1669607

Sundown is an unincorporated community and census-designated place in Ozark County, Missouri, United States. As of the 2020 census, Sundown had a population of 62. Sundown was a village until 2000, when the community disincorporated.

== Geography ==
Sundown is located on the east shore of the Little North Fork arm of Bull Shoals Lake. It lies south of U.S. Route 160 approximately 1.5 miles southwest of Isabella and two miles southeast of Theodosia.

According to the United States Census Bureau, the village has a total area of 1.1 square miles (2.8 km^{2}), all land.

== Demographics ==
Historical population
Census	Pop.	Note	%±
2020	62		—
U.S. Decennial Census

As of the census of 2000, there were 38 people, 17 households, and 14 families residing in the village. The population density was 35.4 inhabitants per square mile (13.7/km^{2}). There were 25 housing units at an average density of 23.3 per square mile (9.0/km^{2}). The racial makeup of the village was 100.00% White.

There were 17 households, out of which 23.5% had children under the age of 18 living with them, 76.5% were married couples living together, 5.9% had a female householder with no husband present, and 17.6% were non-families. 17.6% of all households were made up of individuals, and 11.8% had someone living alone who was 65 years of age or older. The average household size was 2.24 and the average family size was 2.43.

In the village the population was spread out, with 15.8% under the age of 18, 5.3% from 18 to 24, 10.5% from 25 to 44, 34.2% from 45 to 64, and 34.2% who were 65 years of age or older. The median age was 60 years. For every 100 females, there were 81.0 males. For every 100 females age 18 and over, there were 100.0 males.

The median income for a household in the village was $24,500, and the median income for a family was $27,500. Males had a median income of $16,250 versus $36,250 for females. The per capita income for the village was $15,360. There were no families and 8.6% of the population living below the poverty line, including no under eighteens and none of those over 64.
