= Foil, Missouri =

Unincorporated community in Missouri, U.S.

Coordinates: 36°45′22″N 92°38′08″W

Foil is an unincorporated community in northern Ozark County, Missouri, United States. It is located approximately sixteen miles south of Ava on county roads 953 and 955. Wasola is about four miles northeast on Missouri Route 5 and Thornfield approximately three miles southwest on Missouri Route JJ. The community is on the banks of Little Creek, a tributary of Little North Fork White River.

A post office called Foil was in operation between 1909 and 1969. It is unknown why the name "Foil" was applied to this community.
