= Spring Creek (Bryant Creek tributary) =

Stream in the American state of Missouri

Location
- Country: United States
- State: Missouri
- Region: Douglas and Ozark counties

Physical characteristics
- Source
  - coordinates: 36°50′03″N 92°34′37″W
- Mouth
  - coordinates: 36°48′20″N 92°21′56″W
  - elevation: 715 ft (218 m)

Spring Creek is a stream in southern Douglas and northern Ozark counties in the Ozarks of southern Missouri. It is a tributary to Bryant Creek.

The source is a hillside spring just south of Missouri Route N in Douglas County and the confluence with Bryant is in southern Douglas County just west of a bluff below Missouri Route 95.

The stream flows southeast into Ozark County just east of Wasola and turns east just after passing under Missouri Route 95 northeast of Almartha. It flows northeast crossing again under route 95 south of Souder. It continues east past Rockbridge passing under Route N past its confluence with Brixey Creek and back into Douglas County to its confluence with Bryant.
