= Sharp, Missouri =

Unincorporated community in Missouri, U.S.

Coordinates: 36°36′01″N 92°12′28″W

Sharp is an unincorporated community in Ozark County, Missouri, United States. The village location is one-quarter mile south of US 160 between Caulfield and Tecumseh at the head of Hickory Stump Hollow.

== History ==
A post office called Sharp was established in 1890, and remained in operation until 1915. According to tradition, the community was so named on account of a certain settler being considered "sharp".
