= Mammoth, Missouri =

Unincorporated community in the U.S. state of Missouri

- Unincorporated community
- Location within Missouri
- Coordinates: 36°32′09″N 92°24′03″W
- Country: United States
- State: Missouri
- County: Ozark
- Elevation: 669 ft (204 m)
- Time zone: UTC-6 (Central (CST))
  - Summer (DST): UTC-5 (CDT)
- Area code: 417
- GNIS feature ID: 733841

Mammoth is an unincorporated community in Ozark County, Missouri, United States. Mammoth is located along Missouri Route T, 5 miles (8.0 km) south-southeast of Gainesville. Mammoth is situated on the confluence of the Possum Walk Creek flowing into Lick Creek. The mouth of Little Creek is located 1-mile (1.6 km) northwest of Mammoth on Lick Creek.

The area was known as "Lick Valley' and had a post-office established the 28th of June, 1872. The postmaster was Joseph C. Miller, a former Union private in the Ozark County Home Guard Regiment Mounted Cavalry, under the leadership of Captain Thomas B. S. Stone, Company A.

Lick Valley Post-office was discontinued the 6th of March, 1876.

The name Mammoth came into official use with the establishment of the Mammoth Post Office in 1902 by the local post master, William Dye. The post office at Mammoth was discontinued in 1955.
