= Maynard Wallace =

American politician (1943–2021)

Member of the Missouri House of Representatives from the 143rd district
- In office January 8, 2003 – January 5, 2011
- Preceded by: Estel Robirds
- Succeeded by: Lyle Rowland

Personal details
- Born: April 21, 1943 Pondfork, Missouri
- Died: January 17, 2021 (aged 77) Thornfield, Missouri
- Party: Republican

Maynard Leon Wallace (April 21, 1943 – January 17, 2021) was an American politician who served in the Missouri House of Representatives from the 143rd district from 2003 to 2011.

Wallace was born in Pondfork, Missouri, and was a high school basketball coach. He served as superintendent of schools in Ava, Missouri and Forsyth, Missouri. Wallace also served on the Missouri State Board of Education. He died on January 17, 2021, in Thornfield, Missouri, at age 77.
