= Luna, Missouri =

Extinct town in the American state of Missouri

Coordinates: 36°39′07″N 92°18′21″W

Luna is an extinct town in Ozark County, in the U.S. state of Missouri. The GNIS classifies it as a populated place. The community is on a ridge between Bryant Creek to the east and Pine Creek to the west and is located on Missouri Route FF. Zanoni, on Missouri Route 181, lies approximately two miles to the northwest. The community church is one and one-half miles west on Caney Creek and Missouri Route AA. The Pine Creek confluence with Bryant Creek is one and one-quarter miles to the south, at the north end of Norfork Lake.

A post office called Luna was established in 1894, and remained in operation until 1934. The town has the name of the local Luna family.
