= Thornfield Township, Ozark County, Missouri =

Township in Ozark County, Missouri, U.S.

Coordinates: 36.7136°N 92.6800°W

Thornfield Township is an inactive township in Ozark County, in the U.S. state of Missouri.

Thornfield Township was erected in 1870, taking its name from the local Thornfield family. It includes the communities of Thornfield, Hammond, and Foil, as well as substantial rural surroundings.
