= Almartha, Missouri =

Unincorporated community in Missouri, U.S.

- Community
- Location of Almartha, Missouri Almartha, Missouri (the United States)
- Coordinates: 36°45′51″N 92°31′2″W
- Country: U. S. A.
- State: Missouri
- County: Ozark County
- Elevation: 284 m (932 ft)
- Time zone: UTC-6 (CST)
  - Summer (DST): UTC-5 (CDT)

Almartha is an unincorporated community in northern Ozark County, Missouri, United States. It is located approximately thirteen miles north of Gainesville and four miles southeast of Wasola on Route 95. The village is located in a valley on a tributary of Spring Creek. Several homes are located there. The old mill and current fish hatchery of Rockbridge lies downstream on Spring Creek, about six miles to the east.

A post office called Almartha was established in 1855, and remained in operation until 1969. Actually, the Post Office continued to operate until about 1982–83. Wasola’s post office then took over for the closed office in Almartha changing its old zip code to the now current zip of 65773. The traditional phone line prefix both on party line and private line remains area code 417, then prefix of 265. Almartha, along with the communities of Wasola, Souder, and Rockbridge, have a separate prefix than the county seat, which is located approximately 14 miles south with the prefix of 679. Although Ozark County is a very rural area, the communities of Wasola, Almartha, Souder, and Rockbridge all share their own zip code of 65773 and a phone line prefix of 265.This separates those communities from the rest of Ozark and Douglas counties, while the majority of those communities fall within the school district to the north, which is Douglas County with the town of Ava as the county seat.

The community was named from the first names of early settlers Albert and Martha McSpadden.
