= Brixey Creek =

Brixey Creek Brixy Creek

Location
- Country: United States
- State: Missouri
- Region: Ozark County

Physical characteristics
- Source
  - coordinates: 36°43′26″N 92°26′21″W
- Mouth
  - coordinates: 36°47′20″N 92°23′46″W
  - elevation: 751 ft (229 m)

Brixey Creek (also spelled Brixy Creek) is a stream in Ozark County, Missouri. It is a tributary of Spring Creek. The headwaters of Brixey Creek are southwest of the community of Brixey. The stream flows to the northeast past Brixey and parallels Missouri Route N passing under Route N and Missouri Route 95 just south and east of their intersection. The stream flows north parallel to Route N to its confluence with Spring Creek just east of Rockbridge.

Brixey Creek has the name of the local Brixy family.

== See also ==
- List of rivers of Missouri
