= Dugginsville, Missouri =

Unincorporated community in Missouri, U.S.

- Community
- Location of Dugginsville, Missouri
- Coordinates: 36°30′35″N 92°41′44″W
- Country: U. S. A.
- State: Missouri
- County: Ozark County
- Time zone: UTC-6 (CST)
  - Summer (DST): UTC-5 (CDT)

Dugginsville is an unincorporated community in southwestern Ozark County, Missouri, United States. It is located approximately five miles south of Theodosia, near Bull Shoals Lake and the Arkansas state line.

A post office called Dugginsville was established in 1894, and remained in operation until 1981. The community has the name of the local Duggins family.
