= Bridges Creek =

Location
- Country: United States
- State: Missouri
- Region: Ozark County

Physical characteristics
- Source
  - coordinates: 36°34′50″N 92°11′40″W
- Mouth
  - coordinates: 36°33′08″N 92°16′02″W
  - elevation: 558 ft (170 m)

Bridges Creek is a stream in southeast Ozark County in the Ozarks of southern Missouri. It is a tributary of the North Fork River.

The stream begins at the junction of North Bridges Creek with South Bridges Creek. The north branch has headwaters in Howell County just west of Caulfield and south of U. S. Route 160 and it flows southwest into Ozark County and past Elijah. South Bridges Creek also starts in Howell County to the south of Caulfield adjacent to Missouri Route 101 and flows southwest to the junction. The two streams are each about five miles in length. Bridges Creek flows southwest from the junction and enters Norfork Lake about two miles south of Tecumseh and just north of Udall.

Bridges Creek has the name of one Mr. Bridge, a pioneer citizen.

== See also ==
- List of rivers of Missouri
