= Thornfield (disambiguation) =

Thornfield is a Canadian racehorse. Thornfield may also refer to:

- Thornfield Township, Ozark County, Missouri, an inactive township
  - Thornfield, Missouri, United States, an unincorporated community
- Thornfield Hall, a location in the novel Jane Eyre by Charlotte Bronte
- Tara Thornfield, a character in the British soap opera Emmerdale
