= Hickory Stump Hollow =

Valley in Missouri, United States

Hickory Stump Hollow is a valley in southeastern Ozark County in the Ozarks of southern Missouri. The valley headwaters lie just south of U.S. Route 160 east of Tecumseh. The stream enters Bridges Creek about one-quarter mile east of the waters of Norfork Lake.

The headwaters of the stream in the valley are at 36°36′04″N 92°13′13″W and the confluence with Bridges Creek is at 36°34′13″N 92°14′26″W.

Hickory Stump Hollow was named for the fact stumps of hickory trees were a common sight in the area.
