= Ocie, Missouri =

Unincorporated community in Missouri, U.S.

- Community
- Location of Ocie, Missouri
- Coordinates: 36°33′33″N 92°45′33″W
- Country: U. S. A.
- State: Missouri
- County: Ozark County
- Elevation: 227 m (745 ft)
- Time zone: UTC-6 (CST)
  - Summer (DST): UTC-5 (CDT)

Ocie is an unincorporated community in southwestern Ozark County, Missouri, United States, 0.66 miles (1.06 km) from the Taney County line. It is located 1.1 miles (1.8 km) south of U.S. Highway 160, 6.0 miles (9.7 km) west-southwest of Theodosia. The townsite is in a valley 0.8 miles (1.3 km) north of the Lick Creek arm of Bull Shoals Lake.

A post office was founded in 1907 and was named for resident Ocie Conklin. The post office closed in 1967. Its mail now comes from Theodosia.
