= Souder, Missouri =

Unincorporated community in Missouri, U.S.

- Community
- Location of Souder, Missouri
- Coordinates: 36°47′38″N 92°27′31″W
- Country: U. S. A.
- State: Missouri
- County: Ozark County
- Elevation: 260 m (850 ft)
- Time zone: UTC-6 (CST)
  - Summer (DST): UTC-5 (CDT)

Souder is an unincorporated community on Spring Creek in northern Ozark County, Missouri, United States. It is thirteen miles north of Gainesville and is located on county road 142, north of Route 95.

A post office was established at Souder in 1903, and remained in operation until 1988. G. W. Souder, an early postmaster, gave the community his last name.
