= Romance, Missouri =

Unincorporated community in Missouri, U.S.

- Community
- Location of Romance, Missouri
- Coordinates: 36°43′2″N 92°30′11″W
- Country: U. S. A.
- State: Missouri
- County: Ozark County
- Elevation: 300 m (980 ft)
- Time zone: UTC-6 (CST)
  - Summer (DST): UTC-5 (CDT)

Romance is an unincorporated community in Ozark County, Missouri, United States. It is located approximately nine miles north of Gainesville. Romance is located in a valley at the confluence of two smaller streams with Ludecker Creek. It lies on state route Y, 2 miles (3.2 km) east of Missouri Route 5 and 2.3 miles (3.7 km) north of Willhoit. The Romance fire tower sits atop a knob at 1,490 feet (450 m), about 2.5 miles east.

== History ==
A post office was established in the community in 1881, which was first named Nora. In 1889, the name was changed to Romance. Romance School was located in the community. The post office was discontinued in 1967.
