= Brixey, Missouri =

Unincorporated community in Missouri, U.S.

- Community
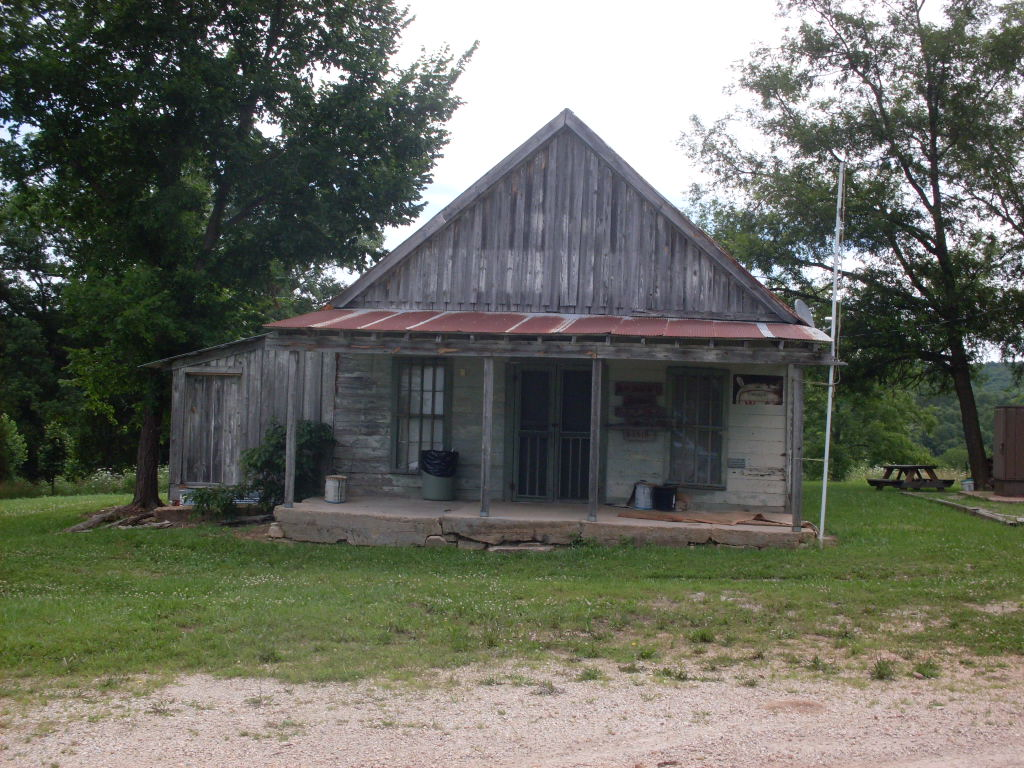
- Old store building at Brixey

- Location of Brixey, Missouri
- Coordinates: 36°45′3″N 92°24′16″W
- Country: U. S. A.
- State: Missouri
- County: Ozark County
- Elevation: 300 m (980 ft)
- Time zone: UTC-6 (CST)
  - Summer (DST): UTC-5 (CDT)
- Zip Code: 65618

Brixey is an unincorporated community in northern Ozark County, Missouri, United States. It is located 1.6 miles (2.6 km) south of Route 95 on Route N or approximately 10 miles (16 km) north of Gainesville.

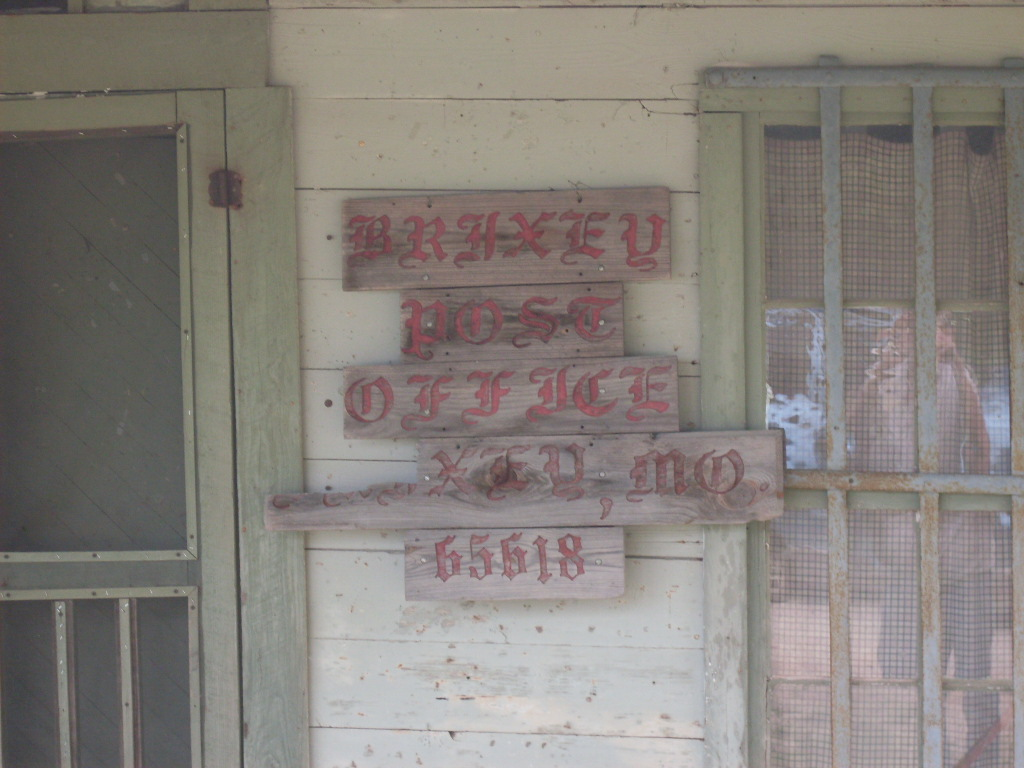
Post office sign on the porch of the Brixey store

A post office called Brixey has been in operation since 1917. The zip code is 65618. A variant spelling was "Brixy". The community takes its name from nearby Brixey Creek
