= Pondfork, Missouri =

Unincorporated community in Missouri, U.S.

Coordinates: 36°42′00″N 92°42′36″W

Pondfork is an unincorporated community in northwest Ozark County, Missouri, United States. Pondfork lies on the Hay Hollow tributary to Pond Fork Creek, which lies to the west. The community is approximately three miles west-southwest of Thornfield. Access is via Missouri Route D, from Missouri Route 95 to the southeast. Pondfork lies within the Mark Twain National Forest.

== History ==
Established in 1907, the Pondfork post office operated until 1955. The community takes its name from nearby Pond Fork creek.
