= Hodgson-Aid Mill =

- U.S. National Register of Historic Places
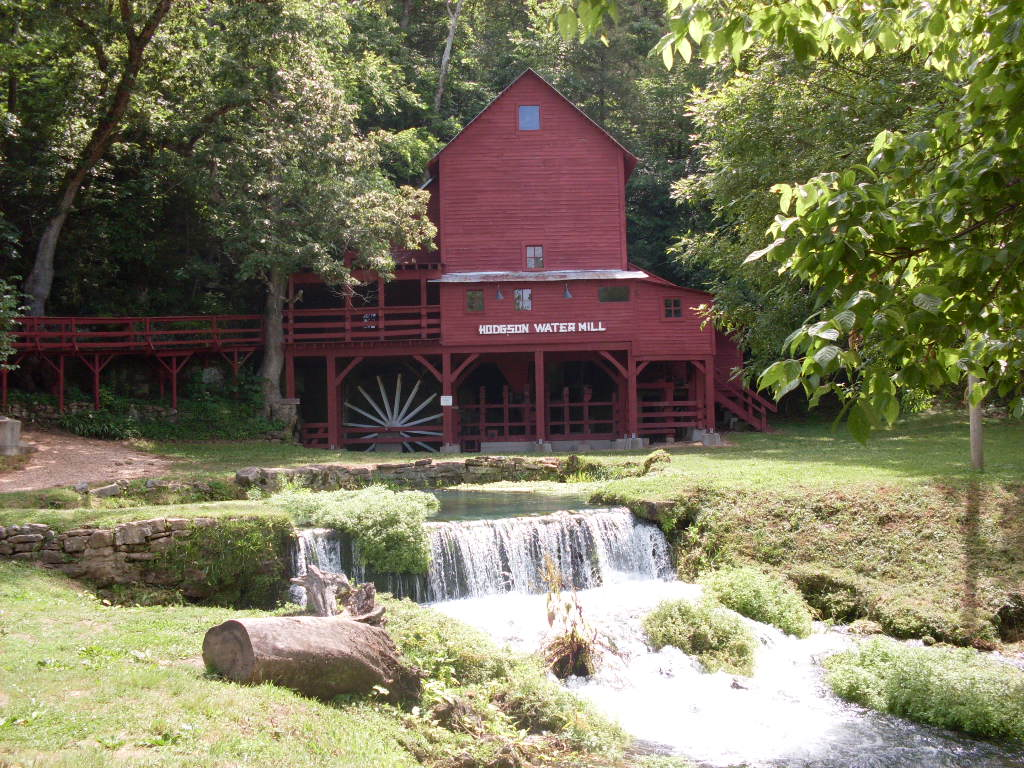
- Hodgson-Aid Mill, June 2014

- Location within Missouri Location within the United States
- Location: Highway 181, near Sycamore, Missouri
- Coordinates: 36°42′28″N 92°15′59″W
- Area: 0 acres (0 ha)
- Built: c. 1897
- Built by: Hodgson, Alva
- NRHP reference No.: 02000015
- Added to NRHP: February 12, 2002

Hodgson-Aid Mill, also known as Hodgson Water Mill and Aid-Hodgson Mill, is a historic grist mill located on Bryant Creek near Sycamore, Ozark County, Missouri. It was constructed around 1897, and is a 3 1/2-story, timber frame mill building covered with red-painted weatherboards. Associated with the mill are the man-made mill pond and the limestone barrel vault constructed at the base of the cliff where Hodgson Spring discharges. The mill has not been in operation since 1976. It is privately owned.

It was listed on the National Register of Historic Places in 2002.

== History ==
The area around Hodgson-Aid Mill had been settled prior to the Civil War; Ozark County, Missouri was organized in 1841, and until 1857, included parts of Howell and Douglas County. The Hodgson-Aid Water Mill is at least the second mill to be located on the Hodgson Mill Spring. In the early 1860s, William Holeman settled on Bryant Creek and constructed a water mill on or near the site of the Hodgson-Aid Mill. This mill was closed during the Civil War. It is unclear whether Holeman reopened this original mill, or whether he had to construct a new mill after the war. It is reported that Holeman's mill was powered by a vertical wood turbine. Holeman operated the mill until his death in 1879.

In 1884, Alva Hodgson and his mother, Mary Elizabeth Hodgson, purchased the mill from Manuel and Elizabeth Smith, the parents of Alva's future wife, Mary Elizabeth Smith Hodgson, for $500.00. Alva Hodgson continued to operate Holeman's existing mill, but made plans to construct a state-of-the-art mill capable of producing new white or "patent" flour, a higher quality flour than had previously been produced, made possible by the invention of the "middlings purifier" around 1870. Hodgson used this new milling machinery, including roller mills, and also installed two vertical steel water turbines, known as "Leffel turbines" or now as Francis Turbines.

The mill building also housed a general store and the Sycamore post office, sawmill, and cotton gin. Like other rural gristmills, the mill was likely an economic hub of the community. Farmers visited the mill to have their grain (corn and wheat) to be ground into flour and meal, and were able to buy and sell their crops, as well as other goods and services. The store "not only sold necessities - groceries, hardware, and dry goods - it also bought every valuable commodity produced in the area."

Construction of the new mill was completed around 1897; a notice that appeared in the local newspaper on November 25, 1897, noted that "Mr. Hodgson is making a good grade of flour on his new roller mill." Records show that at this time, Alva Hodgson's brother, George, bought 1/3 interest in the mill. In 1901, Alva Hodgson sold his brother the remaining 2/3 interest, and George Hodgson became sole proprietor. Alva Hodgson went on to build nearby Dawt Mill, completed in 1909, as well as a cotton gin in Harrison Arkansas. He returned to Hodgson Mill to work with his brother and improve the mill; he installed a dynamo to generate electricity to light the mill, and imported and installed two millstones, or buhrstones from the French Pyrenees for stone-grinding flour. Despite failing vision, Alva helped run the mill until his death in 1921. George Hodgson then continued to operate the mill until his death in 1927.

Ownership of the mill passed to Fred O. Foster from 1927 to 1934. In 1934, the mill was purchased by businessman Charles Theodore Aid. The mill stayed in the ownership of the Aid family until 1998 and so became known locally as the Hodgson-Aid Mill, or Aid-Hodgson Mill.

The mill was leased and operated intermittently from 1934 to 1949. In 1949 Fred Leach, an experienced miller, assumed the lease and both operated the mill and began marketing products through wholesalers, mostly whole grain flour and corn meal. He also provided picnic tables, campsites, and operated a gift shop for visitors to the mill. Leach increased production of meal and flour to as much as 2,000 pounds a day.

From 1963 to 1969, the Harold Stott family took over operation of the mill. They expanded the line of products to include "white and yellow cornmeal, whole wheat cereal, and bran, whole wheat, unbleached, rye and pancake flours."

In 1969, Ken and Teena Harrington, avid antiquers visiting the area, stumbled on the property. They took over the lease, and initially began selling antiques and operating canoe rentals for the nearby Bryant River They also offered flour and products in their store, and as demand grew; they incorporated the company as Hodgson Mill Inc, and sold products to wholesalers and grocers.

When Ken took up the lease in 1969, the mill was grinding only a couple of hundred pounds of flour a day. By 1973, sales had grown 500 percent, and the old mill was straining under the maximum of 1 million pounds of wheat and corn a year.

The Harringtons installed two more buhrstones to keep up with demand, and also acquired a site in the nearby Gainesville Missouri industrial park to construct a modern production facility. Production of Hodgson Mill Inc. products moved to the Gainesville location in 1976. No large-scale production has taken place at the Hodgson-Aid Mill since, and the mill has been intermittently operated primarily as a tourist attraction. At some point ca. 1970's a concrete block building was built near the mill building.

The Hodgson-Aid Mill suffered some flood damage in 1982, when water rose into the main milling room. Between 1985 and 1993, Herbert Smith (great-nephew of Alva Hodgson) and his wife leased the mill and provided tours, a store, resort cabins and campground.

The mill was sold to Hank and Jean Macler, who raised money in the community to fund restoration efforts. They stabilized the foundation, used Amish craftspeople to repair flood damage, installed facilities to bottle spring water and registered the Hodgson-Aid Mill in the National Register of Historic Places.

In 2011, the mill was sold to John and Gwen Deakle, experienced preservationists.
