= Blair Hollow =

Valley in the American state of Missouri

Blair Hollow is a valley in Ozark County in the Ozarks of south central Missouri. The valley is a tributary to North Fork River. The head of the valley lies just northwest of U.S. Route 160. Tecumseh is about three miles to the southwest along the North Fork.

The headwaters of the stream in the valley are at 36°36′33″N 92°12′09″W and the confluence with the North Fork River are at 36°37′23″N 92°14′49″W.

Blair Hollow has the name of the local Blair family.
