= Noble, Missouri =

Unincorporated community in Missouri, U.S.

- Community
- Location of Noble, Missouri
- Coordinates: 36°44′52″N 92°34′7″W
- Country: United States
- State: Missouri
- County: Ozark County
- Elevation: 1,080 ft (330 m)
- Time zone: UTC-6 (CST)
  - Summer (DST): UTC-5 (CDT)

Noble is a small unincorporated community in Ozark County, Missouri, United States. It is located on a ridge along Route A, one mile west of Route 5 and twelve miles northwest of Gainesville.

A post office was established at Noble in 1890, and remained in operation until 1999. According to one tradition, one Mr. Noble, an early postmaster, gave the community his last name.
