= Pontiac, Missouri =

Unincorporated community in Missouri, U.S.

- Census-designated place
- Location of Pontiac, Missouri
- Coordinates: 36°30′56″N 92°36′14″W
- Country: U. S. A.
- State: Missouri
- County: Ozark County

Area
  - Total: 3.29 sq mi (8.51 km^{2})
  - Land: 2.51 sq mi (6.49 km^{2})
  - Water: 0.78 sq mi (2.02 km^{2})
- Elevation: 823 ft (251 m)

Population (2020)
  - Total: 123
  - Density: 49.1/sq mi (18.96/km^{2})
- Time zone: UTC-6 (CST)
  - Summer (DST): UTC-5 (CDT)
- Zip Code: 65729
- FIPS code: 29-59060

Pontiac is a census-designated place in southern Ozark County, Missouri, United States. It lies six miles south of Isabella and 18.5 miles southwest of Gainesville, on the northeast shore of Bull Shoals Lake.

A post office called Pontiac has been in operation since 1887. The community was named in honor of the Ottawa Indian chief Pontiac, perhaps via Pontiac, Michigan.

The town is on a ridge above the lake at an elevation of about 820 feet. The lake has a normal surface elevation of 654 feet. The town consists of a post office, a marina and campgrounds on the lake, a restaurant, and a church. Pontiac is accessed via Missouri Route W from Missouri Route 5 south of Gainesville.

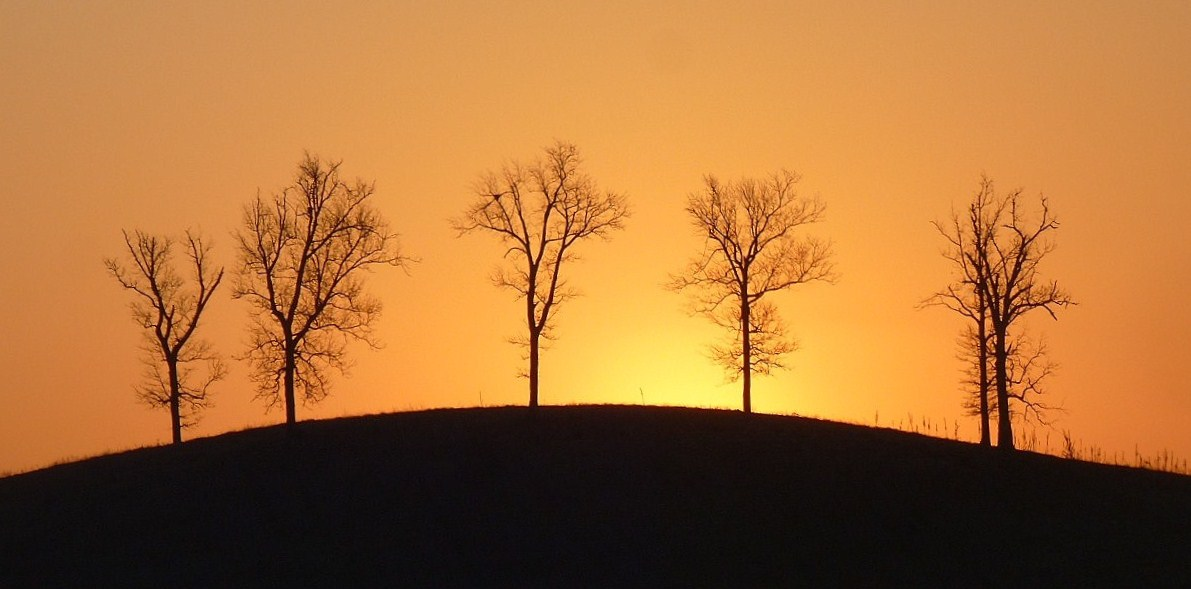
Sunrise on Highway W In Pontiac, Missouri

== Demographics ==
Historical population
| Census | Pop. | Note | %± |
|---|---|---|---|
| 2020 | 123 | | — |
U.S. Decennial Census
