= Toledo, Ozark County, Missouri =

Unincorporated community in Missouri, U.S.

Toledo, Missouri
- Community
- Location of Toledo, Missouri Toledo, Missouri (the United States)
- Coordinates: 36°46′28″N 92°41′08″W
- Country: U. S. A.
- State: Missouri
- County: Ozark County
- Elevation: 272 m (892 ft)
- Time zone: UTC-6 (CST)
  - Summer (DST): UTC-5 (CDT)

Toledo is an unincorporated community in Ozark County, in the U.S. state of Missouri. Toledo is located in the valley of the Little North Fork White River, approximately four miles north of Thornfield and Missouri Route 95.

== History ==
Toledo was formerly called Benners. A post office was established as Benners in 1898, the name was changed to Toledo in 1910, and the post office closed in 1942. The present name is a transfer from Toledo, Ohio. Little remains of the original community since much of the surrounding area was given over to the Mark Twain National Forest.
