= Lonnie Robertson =

American musician

Lonnie Robertson (January 8, 1908 in Longrun, Missouri – 1981) was an American musician, singer and composer

Born in Missouri, Robertson was recognized for his skill as a fiddle player. He also played guitar and mandolin, sang, and composed fiddle tunes. They also printed and sold song books. .

Robertson recorded many of his tunes from the 1960s to 1981, often on Caney Mountain Records. He and his wife Thelma played on radio station KWTO in Springfield, Missouri, for a number of years.
