= Possum Walk =

Possum Walk may refer to:

- Possum Walk Hotel, a historic building in Nodaway County, Missouri
- Possum Walk, Missouri, an unincorporated community in Nodaway County, Missouri
- Possum Walk, Texas, a former town in Trinity County, Texas

== See also ==
- Possum Walk Creek (disambiguation)
