= Lick Creek Township, Ozark County, Missouri =

Township in Ozark County, Missouri, U.S.

Coordinates: 36.5456°N 92.3267°W

Lick Creek Township is an inactive township in Ozark County, in the U.S. state of Missouri.

Lick Creek Township was established in 1841, taking its name from the creek of the same name within its borders.
