= Lutie, Missouri =

Unincorporated community in Missouri, U.S.

Coordinates: 36°35′14″N 92°41′52″W

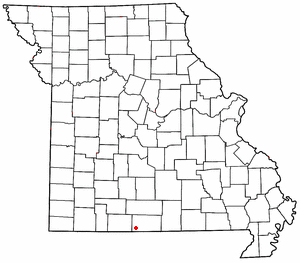

Lutie is an unincorporated community in Ozark County, Missouri, United States. It is located at the southern terminus of Route 95 on U.S. Route 160, approximately three miles west of Theodosia.

A post office called Lutie was established in 1893, and remained in operation until 1960. The community most likely was named after a woman named Lutie who was related to a certain early settler.

== Notable person ==
Lloyd Brown, one of the longest-lived World War I veterans, was born at Lutie in 1901.
