= Willhoit, Missouri =

Unincorporated community in Missouri, U.S.

- Community
- Location of Willhoit, Missouri
- Coordinates: 36°41′1″N 92°30′20″W
- Country: U. S. A.
- State: Missouri
- County: Ozark County
- Elevation: 270 m (890 ft)
- Time zone: UTC-6 (CST)
  - Summer (DST): UTC-5 (CDT)

Willhoit is an unincorporated community in Ozark County, Missouri, United States. It is located approximately eight miles north of Gainesville, just east of Route 5 on a county road. The community lies in a valley at the junction of Ludecker and Barren Fork Creeks.

== History ==
In 1908, a post office was established in the community and named Wilhoit after J. W. Wilhoit. In 1895, the post office had been named Arp after a storekeeper. A later postmaster changed the spelling to Willhoit. The post office closed in 1974.
