= Barren Fork Township, Ozark County, Missouri =

Township in Ozark County, Missouri, U.S.

Coordinates: 36.7289°N 92.5033°W

Barren Fork Township is an inactive township in Ozark County, in the U.S. state of Missouri.

Barren Fork Township was erected in 1841, taking its name from the creek of the same name within its borders.
