= Sycamore, Missouri =

Unincorporated community in Missouri, U.S.

- Community
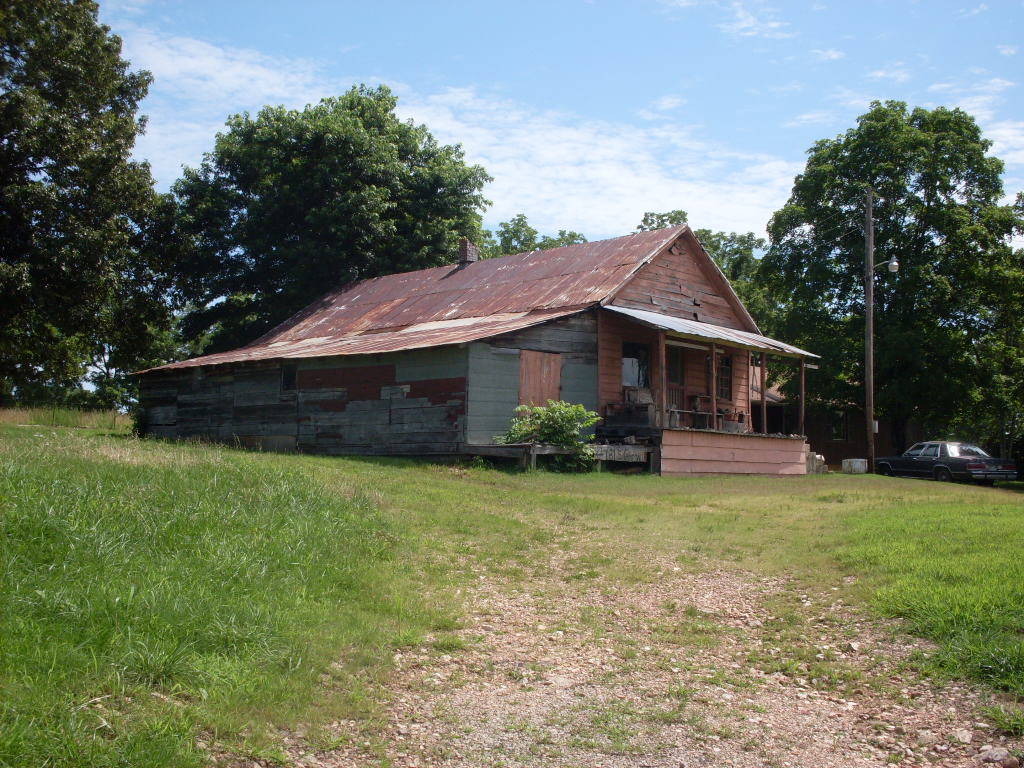
- The old Sycamore store building on the north side of Route 181

- Location of Sycamore, Missouri Sycamore, Missouri (the United States)
- Coordinates: 36°42′12″N 92°16′28″W
- Country: U. S. A.
- State: Missouri
- County: Ozark County
- Elevation: 250 m (820 ft)
- Time zone: UTC-6 (CST)
  - Summer (DST): UTC-5 (CDT)

Sycamore is an unincorporated community in eastern Ozark County in the Ozarks of southern Missouri, United States. It is located on Route 181, approximately fourteen miles northeast of Gainesville. The old townsite is located on a ridge on the west side of Bryant Creek, a major tributary of the North Fork River. The old Hodgson Mill and spring lie on Bryant Creek 0.8 mi (1.3 km) to the northeast. The mill was nominated to the National Register of Historic Places as Aid-Hodgson Mill in 2001.

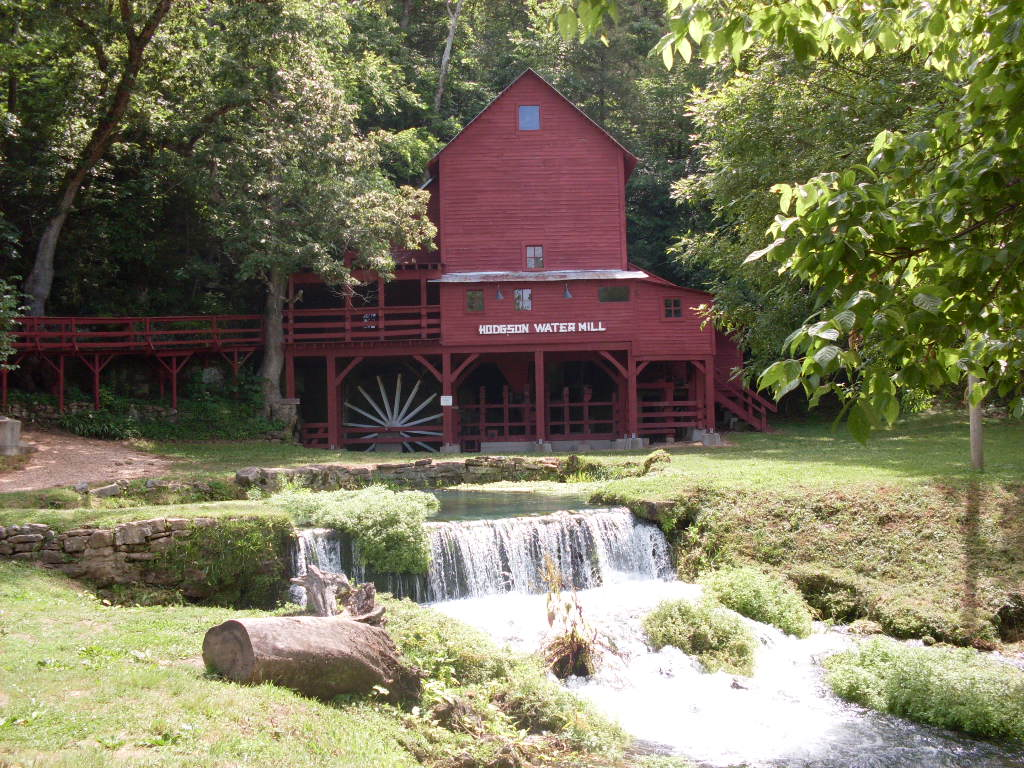
Historic Hodgson Mill on Bryant Creek northeast of Sycamore

The community was founded in 1891 and named for a grove of American sycamore trees near the original town site. The community post office was originally located in Hodgson Mill in 1891. The post office was later moved to the Sycamore store and remained active until 1973.
