= Trail, Missouri =

Unincorporated community in the U.S. state of Missouri

- Community
- Location of Trail, Missouri Trail, Missouri (the United States)
- Coordinates: 36°46′5″N 92°17′43″W
- Country: U. S. A.
- State: Missouri
- County: Ozark County
- Elevation: 230 m (750 ft)
- Time zone: UTC-6 (CST)
  - Summer (DST): UTC-5 (CDT)

Trail is an unincorporated community in northern Ozark County, Missouri, United States. It is located approximately twenty-two miles northeast of Gainesville. Access is from Missouri Route 14 in Douglas County south via route AC. The village site is located adjacent to Trail Creek. Trail Creek flows into Bryant Creek, about one mile to the southwest. The Trail cemetery lies about a mile to the northeast along Trail Creek.

== History ==
A post office called Toledo was established in 1890, and remained in operation until 1963. The community name was derived from a family name of local residents.
