= Estel Robirds =

American politician (1934–2024)

Member of the Missouri House of Representatives from the 143rd district
- In office January 6, 1993 – January 8, 2003
- Preceded by: Jim Mitchell
- Succeeded by: Maynard Wallace

Personal details
- Born: October 15, 1934 Ozark County, Missouri, U.S.
- Died: March 25, 2024 (aged 89) Ozark County, Missouri, U.S.
- Party: Republican

Estel Robirds (October 15, 1934 – March 25, 2024) was an American politician who served in the Missouri House of Representatives from the 143rd district from 1993 to 2003. Robirds died in Ozark County, Missouri on March 25, 2024, at the age of 89.
