= Bayou I Township, Ozark County, Missouri =

Township in Ozark County, Missouri, U.S.

Coordinates: 36.5394°N 92.2042°W

Bayou I Township is an inactive township in Ozark County, in the U.S. state of Missouri. It was named after Bayou Creek, which runs within its borders.

== Communities ==
The village of Bakersfield and the unincorporated community of Udall are located within the township.
