= Lick Creek Township =

Lick Creek Township may refer to the following places in the United States:

- Lick Creek Township, Davis County, Iowa
- Lick Creek Township, Van Buren County, Iowa
- Lick Creek Township, Ozark County, Missouri
