= Missouri Route 181 =

State highway in Missouri, U.S.

Route 181
- MO 181 highlighted in red

Route information
- Maintained by MoDOT
- Length: 56.718 mi (91.279 km)

Major junctions
- South end: US 160 in Gainesville
- US 60 in Cabool
- North end: US 60 Bus. in Cabool

Location
- Country: United States
- State: Missouri

Highway system
- Missouri State Highway System; Interstate; US; State; Supplemental
← Route 180	→ Route 185

Route 181 is a highway in southern Missouri. Its southern terminus is at US 160 in Gainesville in Ozark County. It passes through eastern Douglas County and reaches its northern terminus at Business U.S. Route 60 in Cabool in Texas County.

== Route description ==
Route 181 begins at an intersection with US 160 near Gainesville and heads northeast, intersecting Route 80. The route passes by Caney Mountain Conservation Area before passing through Zanoni and crossing over Pine Creek. It then passes through Sycamore, past the Hodgson Mill and continues northeast. It then heads due north through Dora in Ozark County and meets Route 14. The route then runs concurrent with Route 14 for 4.8 miles (7.7 km) until meeting the twin bridges at the North Fork River and Spring Creek.The two bridges on Route 14 are separated by an 880-foot-wide (270 m) low point in a north–south trending ridge between the North Fork River and its tributary Spring Creek to the east. Then, the route continues north until meeting up with Route 76 and runs concurrent with it for about 3.5 miles (5.6 km). It then continues north until it approaches Cabool. It interchanges with US 60 before crossing over the Big Piney River and reaching its northern terminus at US 60 Business.

== Major intersections ==
County	Location	mi	km	Destinations	Notes
Ozark	Gainesville	0.000	0.000	US 160 – Gainesville, Tecumseh	Southern terminus
Douglas	Brush Creek Township	25.118	40.424	Route 14 west – Ava	Southern end of Route 14 overlap
Douglas	Richland Township	29.883	48.092	Route 14 east to US 63	Northern end of Route 14 overlap
Douglas	McKinley–Clinton township line	42.525	68.437	Route 76 east – Willow Springs	Southern end of Route 76 overlap
Douglas	Clinton Township	46.047	74.105	Route 76 west to Route 95	Northern end of Route 76 overlap
Texas	Cabool	56.159	90.379	US 60 – Willow Springs, Mountain Grove	
Texas	Cabool	56.718	91.279	US 60 Bus. (Ozark Street)	Northern terminus
1.000 mi = 1.609 km; 1.000 km = 0.621 mi: Concurrency terminus
