= Udall, Missouri =

Unincorporated community in Missouri, U.S.

- Community
- Location of Udall, Missouri
- Coordinates: 36°32′33″N 92°15′45″W
- Country: U. S. A.
- State: Missouri
- County: Ozark County
- Elevation: 250 m (820 ft)
- Time zone: UTC-6 (CST)
  - Summer (DST): UTC-5 (CDT)

Udall is an unincorporated community in the Bayou I Township of Ozark County, in southern Missouri, United States, located approximately 12 miles southeast of Gainesville and eight miles west of Bakersfield on Missouri Route O. One and one-half miles west of Udall, the road ends at a park and landing on Norfork Lake.

== History ==
An early variant name was "Saint Leger". A post office called Saint Leger was established in 1848, the name was changed to Udall in 1885, and the post office closed in 2003. According to legend, the present name Udall is a contraction of "You doll, get up", a command, the story continues, was once overheard directed at a horse.
