= Possum Walk Creek (Lick Creek tributary) =

Stream in the U.S. state of Missouri

Location
- Country: United States
- State: Missouri and Arkansas
- Region: Ozark County, Missouri and Baxter County, Arkansas

Physical characteristics
- Source
  - coordinates: 36°29′25″N 92°29′22″W
- Mouth
  - coordinates: 36°32′33″N 92°23′43″W
  - elevation: 640 ft (200 m)

Possum Walk Creek is a stream in the U.S. states of Arkansas and Missouri. It is a tributary of Lick Creek. The headwaters are in Baxter County, Arkansas along the east side of Arkansas Route 5. The stream flows northeast into Ozark County, Missouri to its confluence with Lick Creek just north of Missouri Route T about three miles north of the border.

Possum Walk Creek was so named due to the presence of opossums near its course.

== See also ==
- List of rivers of Arkansas
- List of rivers of Missouri
