= Rockbridge, Missouri =

Unincorporated community in Missouri, U.S.

- Community
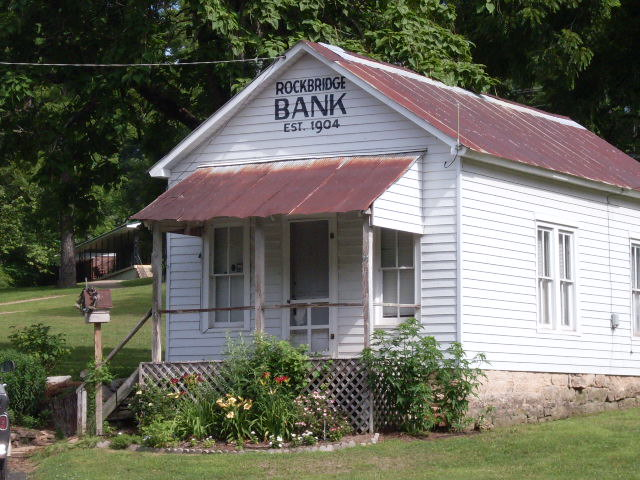
- The old bank building at Rockbridge

- Location of Rockbridge, Missouri
- Coordinates: 36°47′22″N 92°24′33″W
- Country: U. S. A.
- State: Missouri
- County: Ozark County
- Elevation: 230 m (750 ft)
- Time zone: UTC-6 (CST)
  - Summer (DST): UTC-5 (CDT)
- Zip Code: 65741

Rockbridge is an unincorporated community in northern Ozark County, Missouri, United States. It is the site of an old mill on spring-fed Spring Creek, a tributary of Bryant Creek, which still houses the post office. It lies twelve miles north of Gainesville on Missouri Route N, approximately one-half miles north of Route 95. The narrow valley floor is only about 650 feet (200 m) wide and at an elevation of 770 feet (230 m) and the Ozark ridges on either side are 200 to 250 feet (61 to 76 m) higher.

== History ==
The town was founded in the 19th century by pioneer families from Marion County, Kentucky, led by Captain Kim Amyx. The community was burned down during the American Civil War and rebuilt after the war. A post office called Rockbridge has been in operation since 1842. The community was named for a natural rock crossing at a nearby spring.

Rockbridge was once the county seat of a greater Ozark County, encompassing today's Ozark and parts of Douglas and Howell counties.

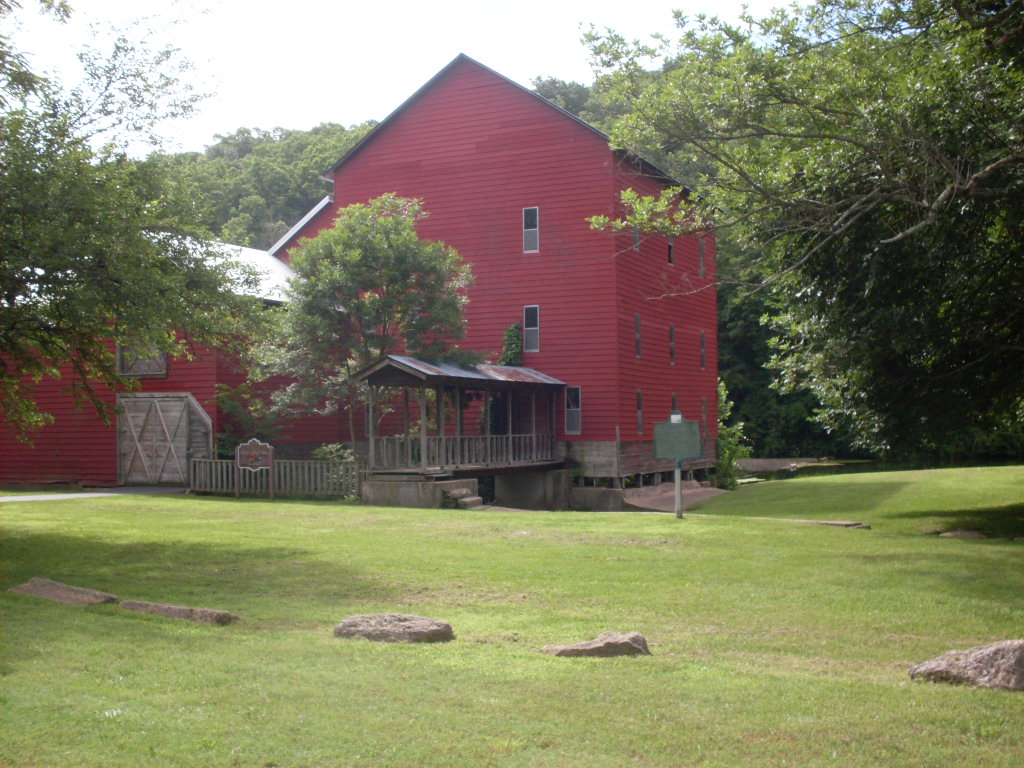
The old mill building at Rockbridge

== Springs ==
This community is in a karst region, with caves, springs, and natural stone bridges nearby. Four springs feed the mill pool and Morris Spring, which forms a small pool along the road below the dam. The Rockbridge Spring has a flow of 19.1 cubic feet per second (0.54 m^{3}/s) and the Morris Spring has a flow of 3.6 cubic feet per second (0.10 m^{3}/s). The springs flow from the contact between the Roubidoux sandstone and the underlying Gasconade dolomite.

The community is now owned by the Rainbow Trout & Game Ranch and Rockbridge Gun Club, founded in 1954, and includes a trout fish hatchery. About five miles to the northwest above the Bryant Creek floodplain in Douglas County is Assumption Abbey, a Trappist monastery.

== Rockbridge Road ==
Rockbridge was a central point along the old Rockbridge Road (or Rockbridge–Springfield Road) established before the Civil War as a freight road between Arkansas and Springfield. The road was used first for the transportation by wagon and ox team of pine lumber from the sawmills of Arkansas to the growing market in Springfield. Following the railroad's arrival to Springfield, the freight usage shifted to cotton which was hauled from northeast Arkansas to Springfield by mule team until after the Civil War.
