= Lick Creek (North Fork River tributary) =

Location
- Country: United States
- State: Missouri
- Region: Ozark County

Physical characteristics
- Source
  - coordinates: 36°40′59″N 92°26′38″W
- Mouth
  - coordinates: 36°32′57″N 92°16′53″W
  - elevation: 548 ft (167 m)

Lick Creek is a stream in Ozark County, Missouri. It is a tributary of the North Fork River.

The headwaters of Lick Creek are within the Caney Mountain Conservation Area about five miles north of Gainesville. The stream flows south paralleling Missouri Route 5 north of Gainesville and passing under U. S. Route 160 in south Gainesville. The stream flows south and then east to enter Norfork Lake across the lake from Udall.

Lick Creek was so named on account of mineral licks near its course.

== See also ==
- List of rivers of Missouri
