= Possum Walk Creek =

Possum Walk Creek may refer to:

- Possum Walk Creek (Lick Creek), a stream in Arkansas and Missouri
- Possum Walk Creek (Mayes Branch), a stream in Missouri
