= Lloyd Brown (veteran) =

American centenarian

Lloyd Brown (October 7, 1901 – March 29, 2007) was one of the last surviving American veterans of the First World War and also the last member of the United States Navy to have enlisted before the German armistice. Born in Lutie, Missouri, Brown enlisted at age 16, and served as a Seaman Second Class aboard the USS New Hampshire. He was discharged in 1919, but reenlisted in 1921, and served as a Musician 2nd Class. He was discharged in 1925. After his service, he worked at a Washington, D.C. firefighter company covering the White House and foreign embassies.

His age of 105 is subject to some dispute, as he may have been 'only' 104 based on the 1910 Census.
