= Nottinghill, Missouri =

Unincorporated community in Missouri, U.S.

- Community
- Location of Nottinghill, Missouri
- Coordinates: 36°40′6″N 92°34′29″W
- Country: U. S. A.
- State: Missouri
- County: Ozark County
- Elevation: 420 m (1,380 ft)

Population
  - Total: 69
- Time zone: UTC-6 (CST)
  - Summer (DST): UTC-5 (CDT)

Nottinghill is an unincorporated community in Ozark County, Missouri, United States. It is located on Missouri Supplemental Route Z, nine miles northwest of Gainesville.

The community was named after Notting Hill, in London, the former home of a first settler.
