= Longrun, Missouri =

Unincorporated community in Missouri, U.S.

- Community
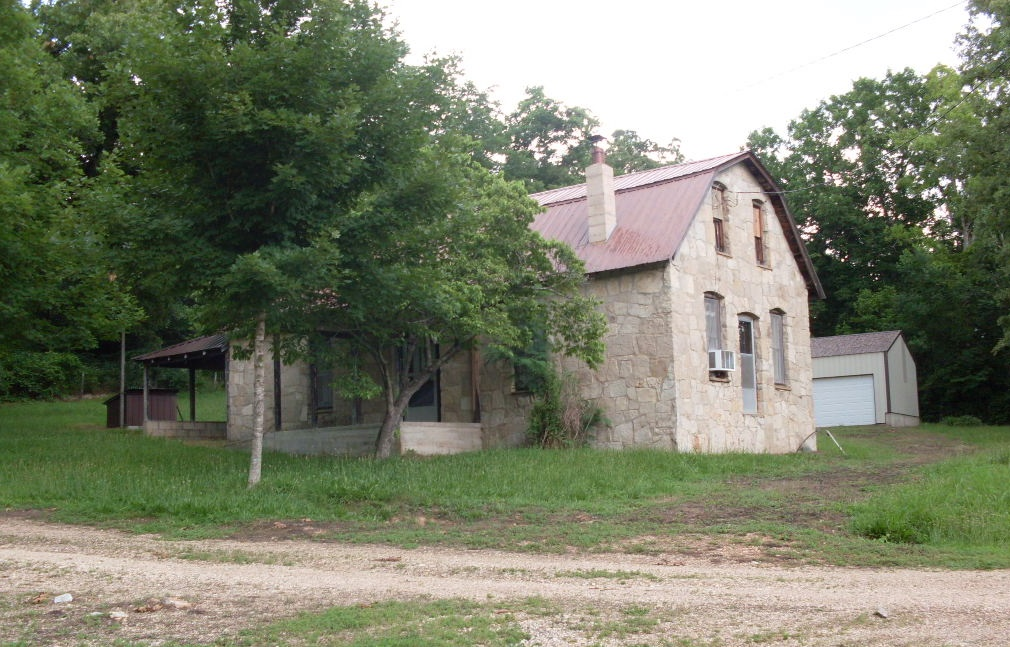
- An old flagstone building at Longrun

- Location of Longrun, Missouri Longrun, Missouri (the United States)
- Coordinates: 36°38′58″N 92°43′22″W
- Country: U. S. A.
- State: Missouri
- County: Ozark County
- Established: 1898
- Elevation: 263 m (863 ft)
- Time zone: UTC-6 (CST)
  - Summer (DST): UTC-5 (CDT)

Longrun is an unincorporated community in western Ozark County, Missouri, United States. It is located on Route 95, approximately 5.7 miles (9.2 km) northwest of Theodosia and 5.4 miles (8.7 km) southwest of Thornfield. Longrun's post office closed and mail delivery is now served by Theodosia.

Longrun was established in 1898 with a post office and school in Longrun Township near Longrun Creek. The post office was discontinued in 1980.
