= Dora, Missouri =

Unincorporated community in Ozark County, Missouri, United States

Coordinates: 36°46′37″N 92°13′03″W

Dora is an unincorporated community in Ozark County, Missouri, United States. The ZIP code for Dora is 65637.

== History ==
Dora was created when James K. P. Dobbs was given a deed from the U.S. government to the land he had homesteaded. The post office at Dora has been in operation since 1879and Dora has been thriving ever since the beginning of the post office. An early postmaster named Johann Gottlieb Anton Fischer gave the community the name of his daughter, Dora Fischer.

== Education ==
Dora is served by the Dora R-III School District.

== Local legend ==
The Blue Man is a local legend of a anthropomorphic bigfoot-like creature. It is said to be 9 feet tall, with black fur, that shone blue in the light. The legend reports that Soloman Collins, was on a hunting trip in the snow, and saw tracks bigger than he ever saw before. He followed them and suddenly had to narrowly avoid getting hit by a boulder. Collins caught a glimpse of the Blue Man and said he had thrown down a 10-foot club before picking up another boulder and many more screaming a high-pitched throughout the happening. After this incident occurred, he warned the people in the area. He gathered a group of people to go and look for the Blue Man. They stayed on his tracks, but no physical evidence was found other than a few small sightings. Although, people in the area did report hearing the same high-pitched scream Soloman heard and then having some livestock disappear.

== Notable people ==
- Steve Cropper (1941–2025), guitarist, songwriter and record producer; born in Dora.
