= Lyle Rowland =

American politician

Member of the Missouri House of Representatives from the 155th district
- In office 2011–2019
- Succeeded by: Karla Eslinger

Personal details
- Born: January 2, 1954 (age 72) Branson, Missouri
- Party: Republican
- Profession: Farmer

Lyle Rowland (born January 2, 1954) is an American politician. He was a member of the Missouri House of Representatives, having served from 2011 to 2019. He is a member of the Republican party.
