= Bakersfield, Missouri =

- Village
- Location of Bakersfield, Missouri
- Coordinates: 36°31′21″N 92°08′32″W
- Country: United States
- State: Missouri
- County: Ozark

Area
  - Total: 1.37 sq mi (3.55 km^{2})
  - Land: 1.37 sq mi (3.55 km^{2})
  - Water: 0 sq mi (0.00 km^{2})
- Elevation: 702 ft (214 m)

Population (2020)
  - Total: 186
  - Density: 135.8/sq mi (52.43/km^{2})
- Time zone: UTC-6 (Central (CST))
  - Summer (DST): UTC-5 (CDT)
- ZIP code: 65609
- Area code: 417
- FIPS code: 29-03052

Bakersfield is a village in southeastern Ozark County in the Ozarks of southern Missouri, United States. The population was 186 at the 2020 census.

== History ==
A post office called Bakersfield has been in operation since 1873. Variant names were "Bakersville" and "Waterville". The community was named after Jim Baker, the original owner of the town site.

== Geography ==
The community is located in the Bayou I Township, on the west side of Bennetts Bayou at the intersection of Missouri routes 101 and 142. It is approximately 1.5 miles north of the Missouri-Arkansas state line. Caulfield lies about seven miles to the northeast on route 101.

According to the United States Census Bureau, the village has a total area of 1.37 square miles (3.55 km^{2}), all land.

== Demographics ==
Historical population
Census	Pop.	Note	%±
1930	181		—
1940	177		−2.2%
1970	210		—
1980	241		14.8%
1990	292		21.2%
2000	285		−2.4%
2010	246		−13.7%
2020	186		−24.4%
U.S. Decennial Census

=== 2010 census ===
As of the census of 2010, there were 246 people, 100 households, and 59 families residing in the village. The population density was 179.6 inhabitants per square mile (69.3/km^{2}). There were 139 housing units at an average density of 101.5 per square mile (39.2/km^{2}). The racial makeup of the village was 96.75% White, 0.41% Native American, 0.41% from other races, and 2.44% from two or more races. Hispanic or Latino of any race were 1.63% of the population.

There were 100 households, of which 33.0% had children under the age of 18 living with them, 45.0% were married couples living together, 10.0% had a female householder with no husband present, 4.0% had a male householder with no wife present, and 41.0% were non-families. 37.0% of all households were made up of individuals, and 19% had someone living alone who was 65 years of age or older. The average household size was 2.46 and the average family size was 3.31.

The median age in the village was 35.8 years. 29.3% of residents were under the age of 18; 7.2% were between the ages of 18 and 24; 22% were from 25 to 44; 24.4% were from 45 to 64; and 17.1% were 65 years of age or older. The gender makeup of the village was 46.7% male and 53.3% female.

=== 2000 census ===
As of the census of 2000, the population density was 200.6 inhabitants per square mile (77.5/km^{2}). There were 125 housing units at an average density of 88.0 per square mile (34.0/km^{2}).

There were 111 households, out of which 35.1% had children under the age of 18 living with them, 55.0% were married couples living together, 11.7% had a female householder with no husband present, and 27.9% were non-families. 27.0% of all households were made up of individuals, and 16.2% had someone living alone who was 65 years of age or older. The average household size was 2.57 and the average family size was 3.15.

In the village, the population was spread out, with 27.7% under the age of 18, 11.2% from 18 to 24, 26.0% from 25 to 44, 18.6% from 45 to 64, and 16.5% who were 65 years of age or older. The median age was 33 years. For every 100 females, there were 91.3 males. For every 100 females age 18 and over, there were 94.3 males.

The median income for a household in the village was $20,139, and the median income for a family was $25,714. Males had a median income of $25,096 versus $18,125 for females. The per capita income for the village was $10,752. About 20.2% of families and 20.9% of the population were below the poverty line, including 23.8% of those under the age of 18 and 14.6% of those 65 or over.
