= Clinton Township, Douglas County, Missouri =

Township in Missouri, U.S.

Coordinates: 37°00′49″N 92°08′38″W

Clinton Township is a township in eastern Douglas County, in the U.S. state of Missouri.
