= Hammond, Missouri =

Unincorporated community in Missouri, U.S.

- Unincorporated community
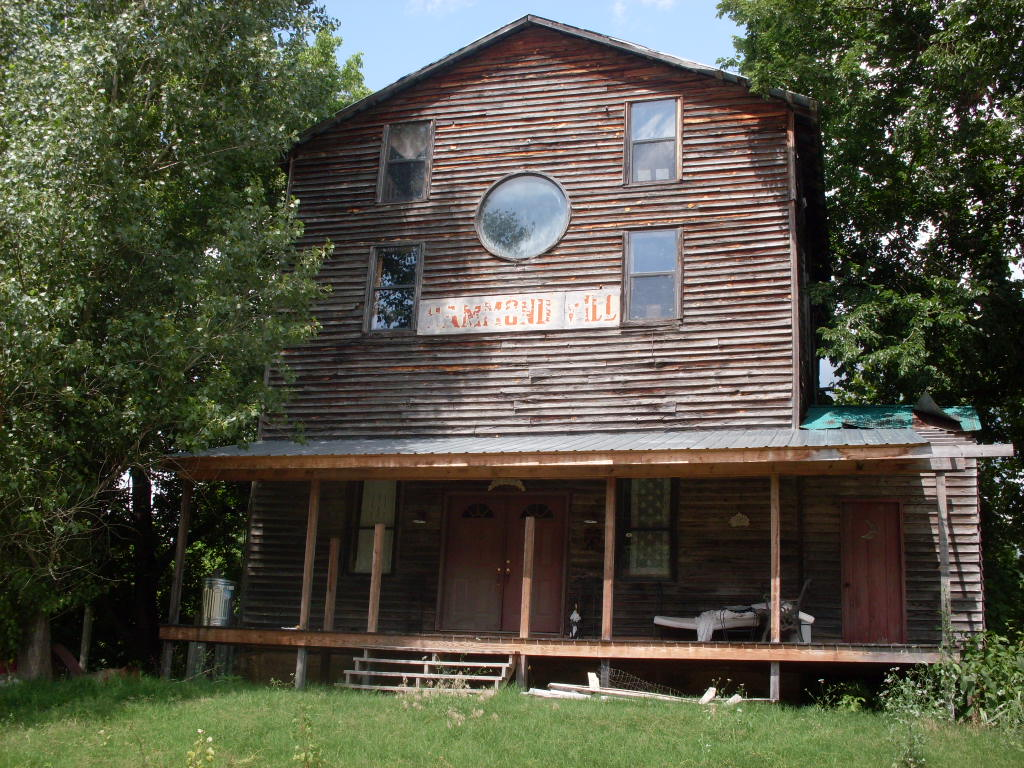
- The old Hammond Mill building in Ozark County, Missouri

- Location of Hammond, Missouri Hammond, Missouri (the United States)
- Coordinates: 36°40′32″N 92°38′40″W
- Country: U. S. A.
- State: Missouri
- County: Ozark County
- Elevation: 227 m (745 ft)
- Time zone: UTC-6 (CST)
  - Summer (DST): UTC-5 (CDT)

Hammond is an unincorporated community in Ozark County, Missouri, United States. It is located at the intersection of two county roads on the Little North Fork of the White River, approximately twelve miles northwest of Gainesville and 2.5 miles (4.0 km) southeast of Thornfield.

A post office called Hammond was established in 1894, and remained in operation until 1975. Some say the community has the name of the local Hammond family, allegedly the original owners of the town site, while others believe it is unknown why the name "Hammond" was selected.

Hammond is the site of the historic Hammond Mill. The mill was built in 1907 and served as a gristmill until around 1940. The mill has since been restored as a private residence. The townsite lies on the northeast side of a 1,300 feet (400 m) wide stream floodplain at an elevation of 744 feet (227 m) some 200 feet below the adjacent ridge tops.
