= Isabella, Missouri =

Unincorporated community in Missouri, U.S.

- Community
- Location of Isabella, Missouri Isabella, Missouri (the United States)
- Coordinates: 36°34′51″N 92°36′46″W
- Country: U. S. A.
- State: Missouri
- County: Ozark County
- Elevation: 292 m (958 ft)
- Time zone: UTC-6 (CST)
  - Summer (DST): UTC-5 (CDT)
- Postal code: 65676

Isabella is an unincorporated community in Ozark County, Missouri, United States. It is located approximately thirteen miles west of Gainesville and two miles east of Theodosia and Bull Shoals Lake along U.S. Highway 160. Isabella has a post office with the ZIP code 65676.

A post office called Isabella has been in operation since 1856. An early postmaster gave the community the name of his daughter, Isabella Brattin.
