= Zanoni, Missouri =

Unincorporated community in Missouri, U.S.

- Community
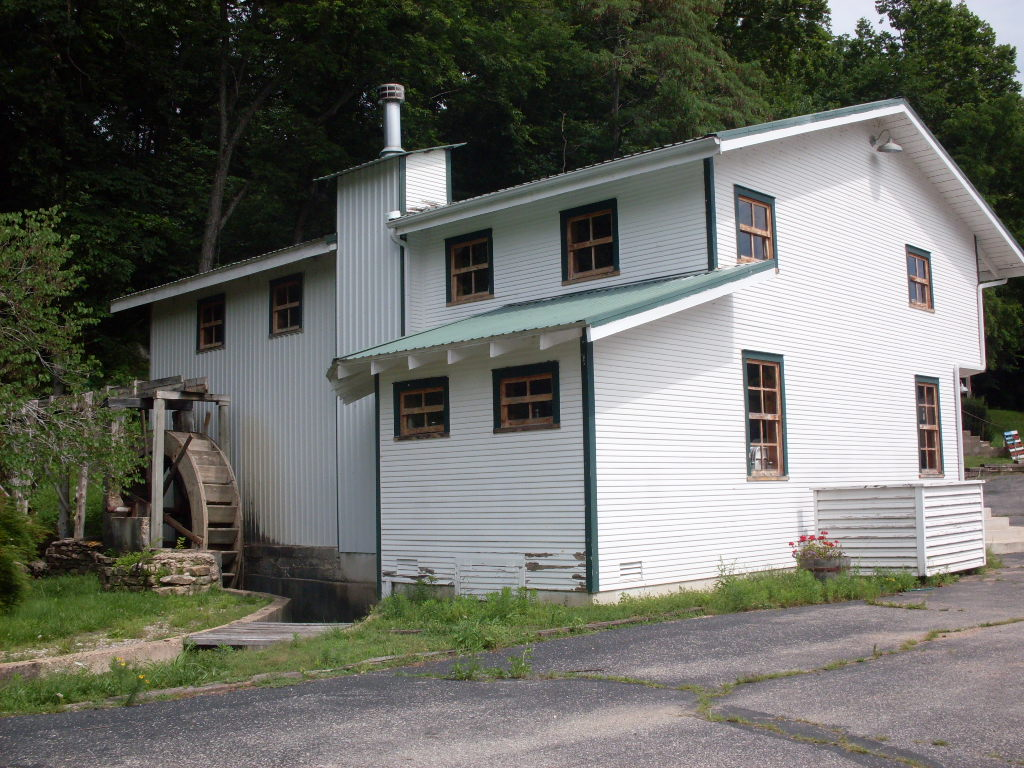
- Mill building and waterwheel at Zanoni

- Location of Zanoni, Missouri
- Coordinates: 36°41′10″N 92°19′55″W
- Country: U. S. A.
- State: Missouri
- County: Ozark County
- Elevation: 220 m (720 ft)
- Time zone: UTC-6 (CST)
  - Summer (DST): UTC-5 (CDT)
- ZIP code: 65784
- Area code: 417

Zanoni is an unincorporated community located in Ozark County, Missouri, United States on Route 181, approximately ten miles northeast of Gainesville. A watermill (doubling as a bed and breakfast) and a post office are all that remain of the community. The community was founded in 1898 and was named for the novel Zanoni by Edward Bulwer-Lytton. The mill was built in 1905 as an overshot wheel mill by "Doc" Morrison and restored by his grandson.

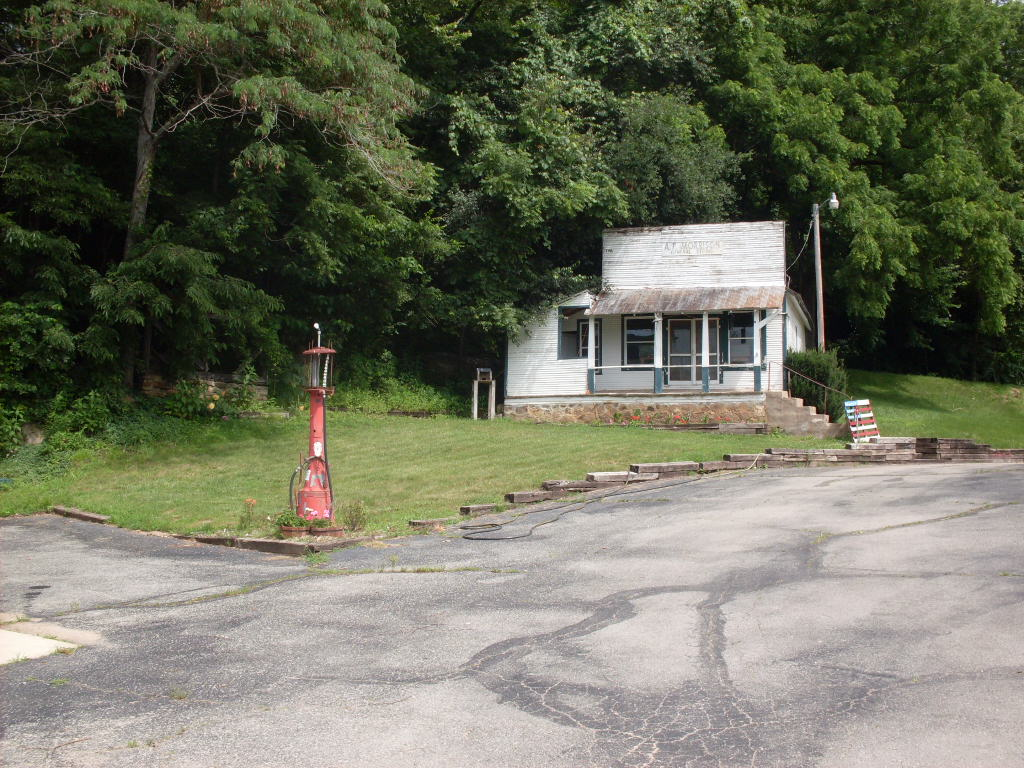
Old store building and gas pump at Zanoni

The mill is located where the Zanoni Spring arises from openings in the Roubidoux Formation, an Ordovician unit of mixed sandstone and dolomite. The spring discharges at the base of a ridge above Pine Creek, a tributary of Caney Creek which discharges into Bryant Creek just above its intersection with North Fork River and Norfork Lake. The discharge of the spring is 0.8 cubic feet per second (0.023 m^{3}/s) or 500,000 US gallons (1,900,000 L) per day.
