= Missouri Route 5 =

State highway in Missouri, U.S.

Route 5
- Route 5 highlighted in red

Route information
- Maintained by MoDOT
- Length: 352.834 mi (567.831 km)
- Existed: 1922–present

Major junctions
- South end: AR 5 at the Arkansas state line near Three Brothers, AR
- US 160 in Gainesville; US 60 in Mansfield; I-44 in Lebanon; US 54 in Camdenton; US 50 in Tipton; I-70 in Boonville; US 24 in Keytesville; US 36 / Route 110 between Laclede and Marceline; US 136 in Unionville
- North end: Iowa 5 at the Iowa state line near Cincinnati, IA

Location
- Country: United States
- State: Missouri
- Counties: Ozark, Douglas, Wright, Laclede, Camden, Morgan, Moniteau, Cooper, Howard, Chariton, Linn, Sullivan, Putnam

Highway system
- Missouri State Highway System; Interstate; US; State; Supplemental
← Route 4	→ Route 6

Missouri Route 5 is the longest state highway in Missouri and the only Missouri state highway to traverse the entire state. To the north, it continues into Iowa as Iowa Highway 5 and to the south it enters Arkansas as Arkansas Highway 5 as part of a three state 650 mile highway 5. With only a few exceptions, it is mostly a two-lane for its entire length.

== Route description ==
Route 5 begins at the Arkansas state line in Ozark County as a continuation of Arkansas Highway 5. Approximately 8.5 miles (13.7 km) to the north of the state line, Route 5 meets U.S. 160 after which it forms a 6.2 mi (10.0 km) east-west concurrency to the east where it enters Gainesville. After leaving its U.S. 160 concurrency to the north, Route 5 continues northwest for approximately 13.2 mi (21.2 km) before forming a 3.3 mi (5.3 km) north-south wrong-way concurrency with Route 95 into Wasola. Route 5 enters Douglas County 0.6 mi (0.97 km) north of Wasola.

Thirteen miles into Douglas County, Route 5 forms a four-mile north–south concurrency with Route 76 past Ava, and serves the town itself with a business route. Within the northwest part of Ava, the concurrent routes intersect Route 14. After Route 76 leaves the concurrency to the east, Route 5 continues for 10 miles before entering Wright County.

Shortly after entering Wright County, Route 5 forms a one-mile east–west concurrency with U.S. 60 (as a limited-access highway) in Mansfield. After leaving its U.S. 60 concurrency to the north, the route intersects with Route 38 in Hartville 11 miles later, and then continues for 24 miles into Laclede County.

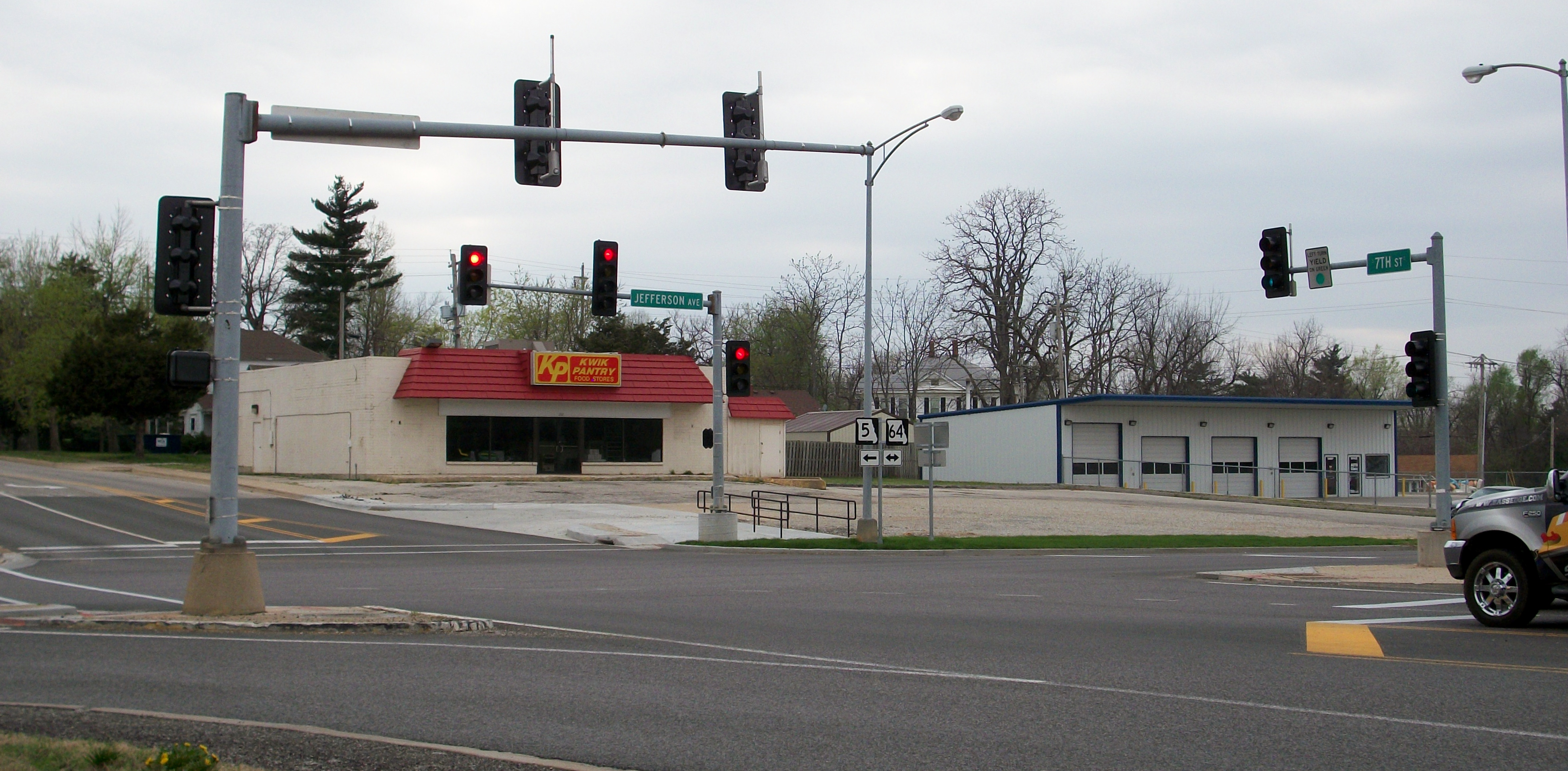
Route 5 southbound turns left onto Route 64 (Jefferson Ave) in Lebanon.

In Laclede County, Route 5 passes through Evergreen, intersects I-44, Route 32 and Route 64 in Lebanon, and enters Camden County 16 miles north of Lebanon.

Between Lebanon and Camdenton, the road has been realigned and straightened, and several older alignments are visible. Just south of Camdenton, Route 5 forms an 11-mile north–south concurrency with Route 7 which continues through the town and intersects U.S. Route 54. After Route 7 leaves Route 5 in Greenview, while Route 7 goes west, Route 5 leaves the Ozark Mountains and crosses the Lake of the Ozarks at the Hurricane Deck Bridge, passing through Sunrise Beach shortly before entering Morgan County.

Twenty miles north into Morgan County, Route 5 forms a short east–west concurrency with Route 52 in Versailles. After leaving its Route 52 concurrency to the north, it continues north for 14 miles and enters Tipton, in which the route forms a four-mile east–west concurrency with U.S. 50. Soon after leaving its U.S. 50 concurrency to the north, Route 5 enters Cooper County.

In Cooper County, Route 5 continues north for 20 miles before intersecting I-70 just south of Boonville. Three miles north of I-70, the route enters Boonville and forms a triple concurrency with U.S. 40 and Route 87. All three routes together cross the Missouri River into Howard County.

Immediately after entering Howard County, Route 87 leaves the concurrency to the west, and less than a mile thereafter, U.S. 40 leaves the concurrency to the east. From there, Route 5 continues north to Fayette, in which it forms a nine-mile concurrency with Route 240 that starts with a north–south alignment, but becomes an east–west alignment after intersecting Route 3. Shortly thereafter, Route 240 leaves the concurrency to the south (ultimately heading west), and Route 5 enters Glasgow, after which it returns to a north–south alignment and enters Chariton County.

Thirteen miles to the north of the Chariton County line, Route 5 forms a five-mile east–west concurrency with U.S. 24 and enters Keytesville, where it leaves the concurrency to the north and enters Linn County 21 miles later.

After entering Linn County, Route 5 immediately passes through Marceline and forms a 12-mile east–west concurrency with U.S. 36 (proposed future Interstate 72) past Brookfield, where they intersect Route 11 together. In Laclede, the route leaves the concurrency to the north at its intersection with Route 139, and passes through Linneus before entering Sullivan County.

In Sullivan County, Route 5 forms an eight-mile concurrency with Route 6 as they bypass Milan to the south and east. Business Route 5 serves Milan directly, using an older alignment of the route, and ends north of the town where Route 6 leaves the concurrent bypass to the east. From there, Route 5 enters Putnam County 15 miles later.

In Putnam County, Route 5 forms a brief east–west concurrency with U.S. Route 136 in Unionville. After leaving its U.S. 136 concurrency to the north, the route crosses the Iowa state line and turns into Iowa Highway 5 in Appanoose County.

Route 5 from I-44 in Lebanon to U.S. 50 in Tipton is a part of the National Highway System, a system of highways important to the nation's defense, economy, and mobility.

== History ==
As built in the original 1922 road system, the route is largely unchanged from its first path. Most of the paths bypassed are now business routes through cities.

In the 1950s a section of the route in Wright, Douglas and Ozark counties between Mansfield and Gainesville was straightened and widened. At this time the city of Ava was bypassed and the old route through the center of the town became business Route 5.

In 2009, a section of the route in Camdenton was rerouted onto a new four-lane highway. The old section became business Route 5.

=== Improvements between Lebanon and Camdenton ===
Beginning in the summer of 2008, MoDOT began a project to convert Route 5 into a "shared four-lane" highway, with continuous passing lanes based on the European 2+1 road model, between Lebanon and Camdenton. A shared four-lane road can be constructed largely within the same footprint as a two-lane road, but allows for alternating passing lanes in each direction. A number of roadways in Europe are built in this way, but Missouri is among the first to do so in the U.S., having first used the method on separate segments of US 63 and Route 37. The project was completed in 2010 for the Camden County section, it was built on a new realignment to bypass the existing alignment. The Laclede County was built with the existing alignment and was completed in 2011.

== Future ==
In February 2025, Lebanon city announced about a proposed expressway to bypass downtown Lebanon, no funding has been provided.

== Major intersections ==
County	Location	mi	km	Destinations	Notes
Ozark		0.000	0.000	AR 5 south – Mountain Home	Arkansas state line
Ozark	Gainesville	8.595	13.832	US 160 west – Isabella, Theodosia	Southern end of US 160 overlap
Ozark	Gainesville	10.711	17.238	US 160 east – West Plains	Northern end of US 160 overlap
Ozark		24.106	38.795	Route 95 north – Almartha	Southern end of Route 95 overlap
Ozark	Wasola	27.351	44.017	Route 95 south – Thornfield	Northern end of Route 95 overlap
Douglas	Ava	40.122	64.570	Route 76 west / Route 5 Bus. north – Forsyth	Southern end of Route 76 overlap
Douglas	Ava	41.935	67.488	Route 14 / Route 5 Bus. south (Northwest 12th Avenue) – Sparta	
Douglas		44.248	71.210	Route 76 east / Route B	Northern end of Route 76 overlap
Wright	Mansfield	54.013	86.925	US 60 Bus. east / Route B – Mansfield	Southern end of US 60 Bus. overlap
Wright	Mansfield	54.185	87.202	US 60 west / Route EE – Springfield	Interchange; northern end of US 60 Bus. overlap; southern end of US 60 overlap
Wright	Mansfield	55.493	89.307	US 60 east / US 60 Bus. west – Mountain Grove, Cabool, Mansfield	Interchange; northern end of US 60 overlap
Wright	Hartville	66.326	106.741	Route 38 to Route 95 – Marshfield	
Laclede	Lebanon	100.926	162.425	Route 32 east – Licking	Southern end of Route 32 overlap
Laclede	Lebanon	101.147	162.780	I-44 – Springfield, Rolla, St. Louis	I-44 exit 129; southern end of Route 64 overlap
Laclede	Lebanon	101.802	163.834	Route 32 / Historic US 66 west – Lebanon	Northern end of Route 32 overlap
Laclede	Lebanon	102.741	165.346	Route 64 west (Jefferson Avenue) – Bennett Springs	Northern end of Route 64 overlap
Camden		124.496	200.357	Route 7 south / Route 5 Bus. north – Camdenton, Richland	Interchange; southern end of Route 7 overlap
Camden	Camdenton	126.628	203.788	US 54 – Camdenton, Nevada, Osage Beach	Interchange
Camden	Camdenton	129.095	207.758	Route 5 Bus. south / Pier 31 Road – Camdenton	Interchange
Lake of the Ozarks				Niangua Bridge	
Camden	Greenview	134.531	216.507	Route 7 north – Climax Springs	Northern end of Route 7 overlap
Lake of the Ozarks		136.531	219.725	Hurricane Deck Bridge	
Morgan	Laurie	146.159	235.220	Route 135 north – Stover	
Morgan	Versailles	162.670	261.792	Route 52 west / Route W – Stover	Southern end of Route 52 overlap; Future roundabout
Morgan		165.374	266.144	Route 52 east – Eldon	Northern end of Route 52 overlap
Moniteau	Tipton	179.843	289.429	US 50 east / Route B – Bunceton, California	Southern end of US 50 overlap
Morgan		184.381	296.732	US 50 west – Syracuse	Northern end of US 50 overlap
Cooper	Boonville	204.055	328.395	I-70 / US 40 west – Kansas City, Columbia	I-70 exit 101; southern end of I-70 Bus. / US 40 overlap
Cooper	Boonville	205.077	330.039	Lewis and Clark Trail west (Sportsman Road)	Former US 40 west; southern end of Lewis and Clark Trail overlap
Cooper	Boonville	207.132	333.347	I-70 BL east / Route 87 south / Lewis and Clark Trail east (Main Street)	Northern end of I-70 Bus. / Lewis and Clark Trail overlap; southern end of Route 87 overlap
Missouri River		207.866	334.528	Boonslick Bridge	
Howard	Old Franklin	208.484	335.522	Route 87 north / Lewis and Clark Trail west – Glasgow, Boone's Lick Historic Site	Northern end of Route 87 overlap; southern end of Lewis and Clark Trail overlap
Howard		209.495	337.150	US 40 east / Lewis and Clark Trail east – Midway	Northern end of US 40 / Lewis and Clark Trail overlap
Howard	Fayette	221.876	357.075	Route 240 east to I-70 / US 40	Southern end of Route 240 overlap
Howard		226.876	365.122	Route 3 north – Armstrong	
Howard		229.658	369.599	Route 240 Bus. west – Glasgow	
Howard		233.827	376.308	Route 87 south / Lewis and Clark Trail east – Boonville	Southern end of Route 87 / Lewis and Clark Trail overlap
Howard	Glasgow	234.343	377.139	Route 240 west – Slater	Northern end of Route 87 / Route 240 overlap; southern end of Route 240 Bus. overlap
Howard	Glasgow	234.839	377.937	Route 240 Bus. east	Northern end of Route 240 Bus. overlap
Chariton		248.214	399.462	US 24 east – Salisbury	Southern end of US 24 overlap
Chariton	Keytesville	252.994	407.154	US 24 west / Lewis and Clark Trail west – Brunswick	Northern end of US 24 / Lewis and Clark Trail overlap
Linn		277.626	446.796	US 36 east / Route 110 (CKC) east / Route U – Macon	Interchange; southern end of US 36 / Route 110 overlap
Linn	Brookfield	284.651	458.101	US 36 Bus. west / Route 11 – Mendon, Brookfield	Interchange
Linn	Brookfield	286.446	460.990	US 36 Bus. east – Brookfield	
Linn	Laclede	290.193	467.020	US 36 west / Route 110 (CKC) west / Route 139 – Chillicothe, Sumner	Northern end of US 36 / Route 110 overlap
Sullivan		316.782	509.811	Route 6 west – Trenton	Southern end of Route 6 overlap
Sullivan		319.953	514.914	Route 5 Bus. north – Milan	
Sullivan	Milan	322.653	519.260	Route 5 Bus. south	
Sullivan	Milan	322.816	519.522	Route 6 east – Green City, Kirksville	Northern end of Route 6 overlap
Putnam		343.843	553.362	US 136 west – Princeton	Southern end of US 136 overlap
Putnam	Unionville	344.399	554.256	US 136 east – Business District	Northern end of US 136 overlap
Putnam		352.834	567.831	Iowa 5 north – Centerville	Iowa state line
1.000 mi = 1.609 km; 1.000 km = 0.621 mi: Concurrency terminus

== Business routes ==
=== Ava route ===
Route 5 Business
- Location: Ava
- Length: 2.36 mi (3.80 km)

A two-mile business route of MO 5 exists with Ava.

=== Camdenton route ===
Route 5 Business
- Location: Camden County
- Length: 4.94 mi (7.95 km)
- Existed: 2009–present

A five-mile business route of MO 5 exists that passes through Camdenton. It was created in 2009.

=== Milan route ===
Route 5 Business
- Location: Sullivan County
- Length: 2.64 mi (4.25 km)

A three-mile business route of MO 5 that passes through Milan.

== See also ==
- List of state highways in Missouri
