= Wasola, Missouri =

Unincorporated community in Missouri, U.S.

- census-designated place
- Location of Wasola, Missouri Wasola, Missouri (the United States)
- Coordinates: 36°47′40″N 92°34′31″W
- Country: U. S. A.
- State: Missouri
- County: Ozark County

Area
  - Total: 5.30 sq mi (13.73 km^{2})
  - Land: 5.30 sq mi (13.72 km^{2})
  - Water: 0.0039 sq mi (0.01 km^{2})
- Elevation: 1,280 ft (390 m)

Population (2020)
  - Total: 115
  - Density: 21.7/sq mi (8.38/km^{2})
- Time zone: UTC-6 (CST)
  - Summer (DST): UTC-5 (CDT)
- Postal code: 65773
- FIPS code: 29-77794

Wasola is an unincorporated community in northern Ozark County, Missouri, United States. As of the 2020 census, Wasola had a population of 115. It is located sixteen miles north of Gainesville on Route 5, at its northern intersection with Route 95. The Ozark–Douglas county line is approximately one–half mile north of the town. A few businesses and homes are located there.

The community was founded in 1912 and its name has an unknown derivation, according to Ramsay, possibly it is a coinage that is reminiscent of a Native American word. The Wasola post office was established in 1914 and has Zip code 65773.

== Demographics ==
Historical population
Census	Pop.	Note	%±
2020	115		—
U.S. Decennial Census
