= Tecumseh, Missouri =

Unincorporated community in Missouri, U.S.

- Community
- Location of Tecumseh, Missouri
- Coordinates: 36°35′12″N 92°17′12″W
- Country: U. S. A.
- State: Missouri
- County: Ozark County
- Elevation: 180 m (590 ft)
- Time zone: UTC-6 (CST)
  - Summer (DST): UTC-5 (CDT)
- Zip Code: 65760

Tecumseh (/tɪˈkʌmsə/ tih-KUM-sə) is an unincorporated community in eastern Ozark County in southern Missouri, United States. It is located on the North Fork River at the north end of Norfork Lake, approximately ten miles east of Gainesville and 32 miles west of West Plains on U.S. Highway 160. Tecumseh has a post office with ZIP code 65760.

A post office called Tecumseh has been in operation since 1898. The community was named after Tecumseh, a Shawnee Indian chief.
