= Thornfield, Missouri =

Unincorporated community in Ozark County, Missouri, United States

Thornfield
- Unincorporated community
- Location within Missouri Location within the United States
- Coordinates: 36.708527006542°N 92.65899559855124°W
- Country: United States
- State: Missouri
- County: Ozark
- Elevation: 804 ft (245 m)
- ZIP Code: 65762
- Area code: 417

Thornfield is an unincorporated community in Ozark County, Missouri, United States.

== Description ==
The community is located 15 miles (24 km) northwest of Gainesville, on Missouri Route 95 at the Little North Fork of the White River on the edge of the Mark Twain National Forest between Wasola to the northeast and Longrun to the southwest. Hammond, the site of the historic Hammond Mill, lies on the Little North Fork 2.5 miles (4.0 km) southeast of Thornfield. Thornfield has a post office with ZIP code 65762.

A post office called Thornfield has been in open since 1878. The area was named for the local Thornfield family.

Thornfield R-1 Elementary School is about one mile east of the town on Route 95.

Thornfield (GNIS FID: 752535) is a populated place located within the Township of Thornfield, a minor civil division (MCD) of Ozark County.

The elevation of Thornfield is 807 feet. Thornfield appears on the Thornfield U.S. Geological Survey Map.
