= Missouri Route 95 =

State highway in Missouri, U.S.

Route 95
- MO 95 highlighted in red

Route information
- Maintained by MoDOT
- Length: 93.051 mi (149.751 km)

Major junctions
- South end: US 160 at Lutie
- US 60 in Mountain Grove
- North end: Route 32 at Lynchburg

Location
- Country: United States
- State: Missouri

Highway system
- Missouri State Highway System; Interstate; US; State; Supplemental
← Route 94	→ Route 96

Route 95 is a highway in southern Missouri. Its northern terminus is at Route 32 at Lynchburg in Laclede County. Its southern terminus is at U.S. Route 160 at Lutie about 2.5 miles west of the Theodosia arm of Bull Shoals Lake in Ozark County.

A short 3.3 miles (5.3 km) section forms a wrong-way concurrency with Route 5; Route 95 is marked as "North Route 95" but goes south at this location.

== Route description ==
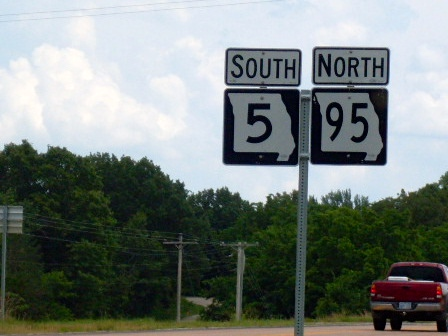
Wrong way concurrency sign on Missouri routes 5 and 95 at Wasola, Missouri

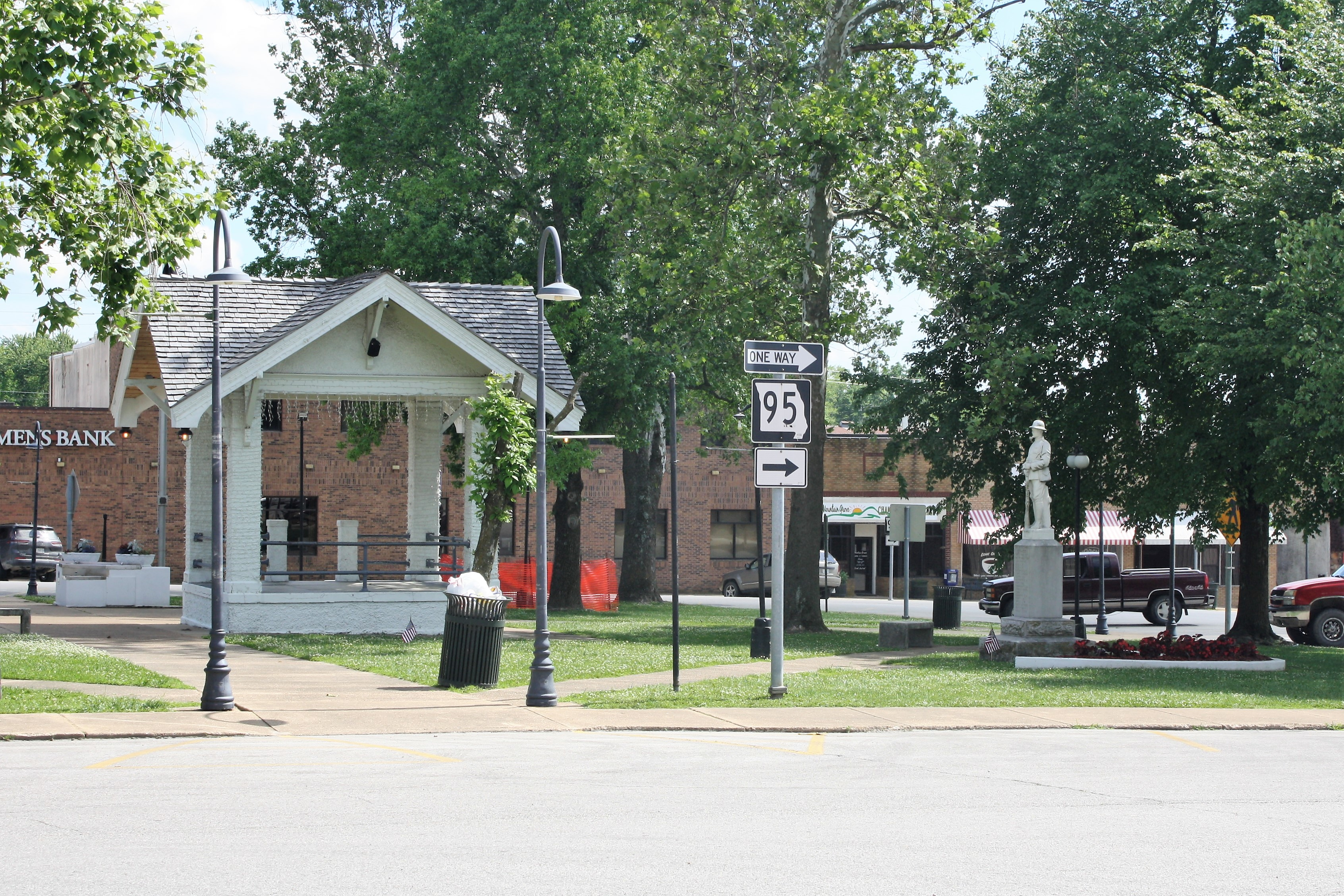
Route 5 turns right in downtown Mountain Grove

== History ==
The section of Route 95 north of Wasola to Lutie was originally a section of Route 5A, a branch of Route 5.

== Major intersections ==
County	Location	mi	km	Destinations	Notes
Ozark	Lutie	0.000	0.000	US 160 to Route 125 – Theodosia	
Ozark	Wasola	20.577	33.115	Route 5 north – Ava	Northern end of Route 5 overlap
Ozark	Barren Fork Township	23.822	38.338	Route 5 south – Gainesville	Southern end of Route 5 overlap
Douglas	Gentryville	41.523	66.825	Route 14 – Twin Bridges, Ava	
Douglas	Wood Township	51.022	82.112	Route 76 to Route 5 – Willow Springs	
Wright	Mountain Grove	62.931	101.278	US 60 Bus. (Third Street)	
Wright	Mountain Grove	64.070	103.111	US 60 – Willow Springs, Springfield	
Wright	Van Buren Township	76.037	122.370	Route 38 – Bendavis, Hartville	
Laclede	Lynchburg	93.051	149.751	Route 32 – Plato, Lebanon	
1.000 mi = 1.609 km; 1.000 km = 0.621 mi: Concurrency terminus
