= Bull Shoals Lake =

Reservoir in Arkansas and Missouri, U.S.

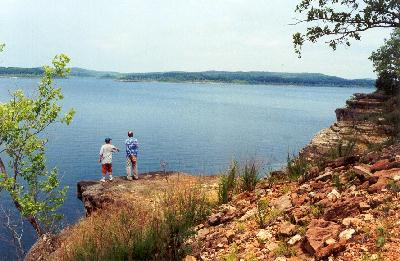

- Location within Arkansas
- Location: northern Arkansas, southern Missouri
- Coordinates: 36°21′55″N 092°34′30″W
- Lake type: reservoir
- Primary inflows: White River
- Primary outflows: White River
- Catchment area: 6,036 sq mi (15,630 km^{2})
- Basin countries: United States
- Max. length: 80 mi (130 km)
- Surface area: 45,150 acres (182.7 km^{2})
- Average depth: 75 ft (23 m)
- Max. depth: 210 ft (64 m)
- Surface elevation: 661 ft (201 m) at normal pool

Bull Shoals Lake is an artificial lake or reservoir in the Ozark Mountains of northern Arkansas and southern Missouri, United States. It has hundreds of miles of lake arms and coves, and common activities include boating, water sports, swimming, and fishing. Nineteen developed parks around the shoreline provide campgrounds, boat launches, swim areas, and marinas.

== History ==
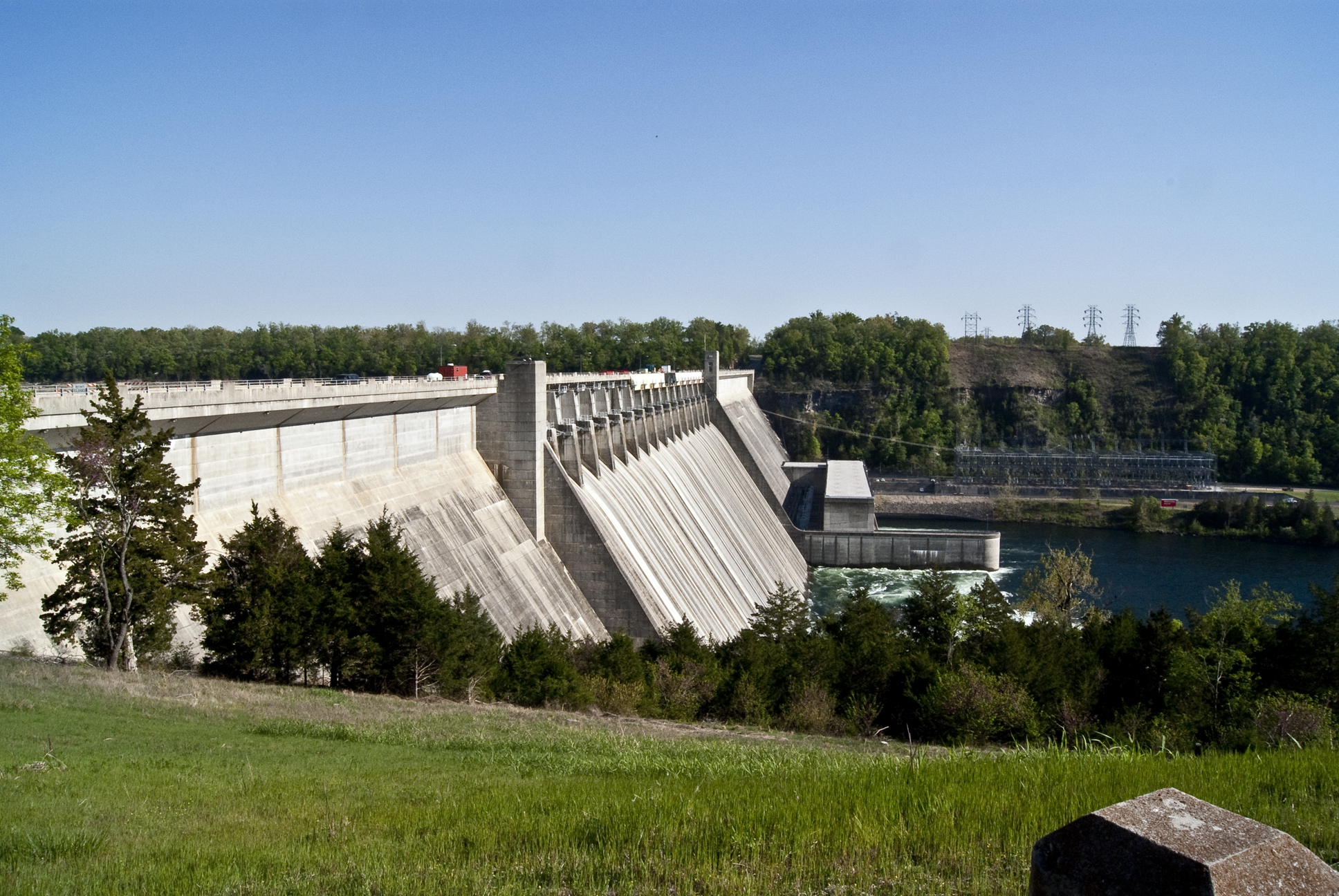
Bull Shoals Dam

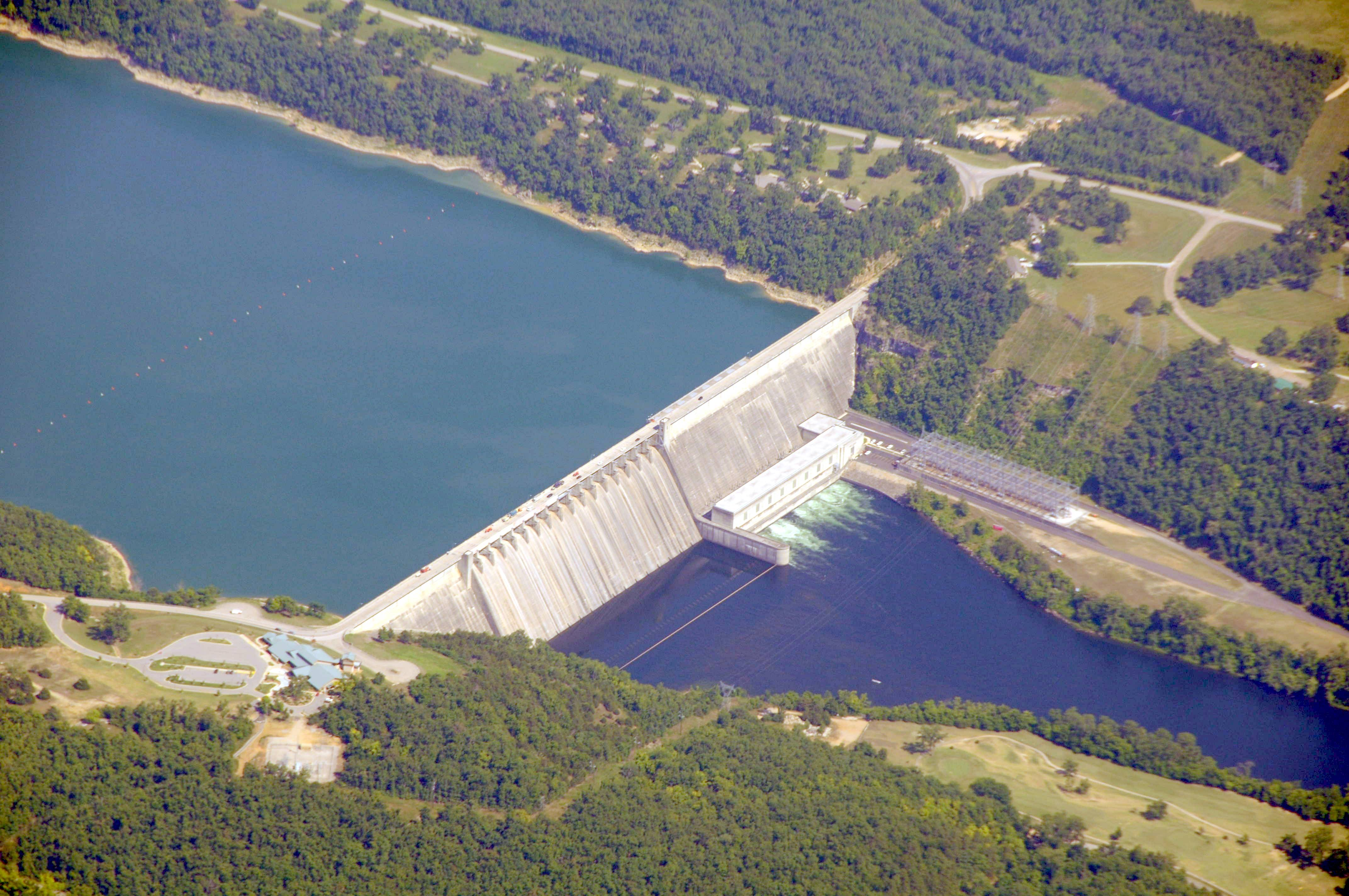
Aerial photo of Bull Shoals Dam

Bull Shoals Dam was created to impound the White River by one of the largest concrete dams in the United States and was the fifth largest dam in the world at its inception. Work on the dam began in 1947, was completed in 1951 and dedicated by President Harry S. Truman in 1952. At least seven small family cemeteries and 20 larger cemeteries were meticulously relocated to accommodate the new lake. Recent national events include Brostock 2010 and 2011 and the TBF Bass Federation and Bassmaster Elite Series Tournaments in 2012.

== Hydrology ==
Bull Shoals Lake impounds the White River for the last time as water travels toward its mouth on the Mississippi River. Bull Shoals is thus the lake farthest downstream in a chain of four artificial lakes that include (from upstream to downstream) Beaver Lake, Table Rock Lake and Lake Taneycomo. The lake is controlled by the Army Corps of Engineers and has the primary purpose of flood control. The level of the lake fluctuates regularly with a normal pool level elevation of 654 feet (199 m) above sea level, which is locally known as powerpool. However, the lake regularly fluctuates between an elevation of 630 to 680 ft (190 to 210 m). The upper part of the lake, below nearby Powersite Dam, is known as the "Pothole".

The shoreline of the lake is undeveloped and protected by a buffer zone (locally called the "take line") owned, operated, managed, and controlled by the Army Corps of Engineers. The dam is designed for a maximum elevation of 695 ft (212 m) (top of the flood pool). Bull Shoals Lake covers 45,000 acres (180 km^{2}) with a 700-mile (1,100 km) shoreline at powerpool to more than 70,000 acres (280 km^{2}) with a 1,000 miles (1,600 km) shoreline at 690 ft (210 m). The bottom of the lake consists of bedrock with very limited vegetation. The shoreline is heavily forested.

== State park ==
The Bull Shoals-White River State Park is a 725-acre (2.93 km^{2}) park in Baxter and Marion Counties of Arkansas both above and below the massive dam. Facilities, including camping, pavilions, dock and interpretive programs, stretch along the banks of the White River. Along the lakeshore, the park offers picnic sites and playgrounds.

== Flooding in 2008 and 2011 ==
In the spring of 2008, due to the record rainfall, Bull Shoals reached its highest water level since 1957. The lake crested at 695.02 ft (211.84 m) above sea level, prompting the Army Corps of Engineers to open the floodgates to relieve the lake from further flooding. A record crest of 696.51 ft (212.30 m) was achieved at 5 p.m. on May 27, 2011, due to record rainfall, exceeding the Spring 2008 lake levels and 1957 levels.

== See also ==
- List of Arkansas dams and reservoirs
