= Theodosia, Missouri =

- Village
- Location of Theodosia, Missouri
- Coordinates: 36°34′41″N 92°39′35″W
- Country: United States
- State: Missouri
- County: Ozark

Area
  - Total: 1.58 sq mi (4.08 km^{2})
  - Land: 1.37 sq mi (3.55 km^{2})
  - Water: 0.20 sq mi (0.53 km^{2})
- Elevation: 889 ft (271 m)

Population (2020)
  - Total: 188
  - Density: 137.2/sq mi (52.99/km^{2})
- Time zone: UTC-6 (Central (CST))
  - Summer (DST): UTC-5 (CDT)
- ZIP code: 65761
- Area code: 417
- FIPS code: 29-72898
- GNIS feature ID: 0752525

Theodosia is a village in Ozark County, Missouri, United States. The population was 188 at the 2020 census.

== History ==
A post office called Theodosia has been in operation since 1886. Some say the community has the name of Theodosia Herd, the wife of an early postmaster, while others believe another postmaster gave the community the name of his daughter, Theodosia Kirby.

== Geography ==
Theodosia is located at 36°34′41″N 92°39′35″W.

According to the United States Census Bureau, the village has a total area of 1.57 square miles (4.07 km^{2}), of which 1.37 square miles (3.55 km^{2}) is land and 0.20 square miles (0.52 km^{2}) is water.

== Demographics ==
Historical population
Census	Pop.	Note	%±
1970	132		—
1980	204		54.5%
1990	235		15.2%
2000	240		2.1%
2010	243		1.3%
2020	188		−22.6%
U.S. Decennial Census

=== 2010 census ===
As of the census of 2010, there were 243 people, 122 households, and 68 families living in the village. The population density was 177.4 inhabitants per square mile (68.5/km^{2}). There were 226 housing units at an average density of 165.0 per square mile (63.7/km^{2}). The racial makeup of the village was 97.94% White and 2.06% from two or more races. Hispanic or Latino of any race were 0.41% of the population.

There were 122 households, of which 17.2% had children under the age of 18 living with them, 41.8% were married couples living together, 11.5% had a female householder with no husband present, 2.5% had a male householder with no wife present, and 44.3% were non-families. 37.7% of all households were made up of individuals, and 21.4% had someone living alone who was 65 years of age or older. The average household size was 1.99 and the average family size was 2.56.

The median age in the village was 54.9 years. 17.7% of residents were under the age of 18; 3.7% were between the ages of 18 and 24; 16.5% were from 25 to 44; 27.3% were from 45 to 64; and 35% were 65 years of age or older. The gender makeup of the village was 51.0% male and 49.0% female.

=== 2000 census ===
At the 2000 census, there were 240 people, 112 households and 75 families living in the village. The population density was 178.3 inhabitants per square mile (68.8/km^{2}). There were 155 housing units at an average density of 115.1 per square mile (44.4/km^{2}). The racial makeup of the village was 98.75% White, and 1.25% from two or more races. Hispanic or Latino of any race were 0.42% of the population.

There were 112 households, of which 17.9% had children under the age of 18 living with them, 52.7% were married couples living together, 10.7% had a female householder with no husband present, and 33.0% were non-families. 31.3% of all households were made up of individuals, and 16.1% had someone living alone who was 65 years of age or older. The average household size was 2.14 and the average family size was 2.59.

Age distribution was 18.8% under the age of 18, 4.2% from 18 to 24, 22.1% from 25 to 44, 30.0% from 45 to 64, and 25.0% who were 65 years of age or older. The median age was 52 years. For every 100 females, there were 93.5 males. For every 100 females age 18 and over, there were 93.1 males.

The median household income was $23,750, and the median family income was $24,375. Males had a median income of $21,528 versus $16,875 for females. The per capita income for the village was $13,149. About 20.0% of families and 28.8% of the population were below the poverty line, including 41.1% of those under the age of eighteen and 8.8% of those 65 or over.

== Notable people ==
- Tava Smiley, actress, born in Theodosia

== In fiction ==
- Maggie Fitzgerald (fictional), the main character in the Academy Award winning film Million Dollar Baby, claimed Theodosia as her hometown.
