= Gainesville, Missouri =

- City
- Location of Gainesville, Missouri
- Coordinates: 36°36′11″N 92°25′42″W
- Country: United States
- State: Missouri
- County: Ozark

Area
  - Total: 2.87 sq mi (7.44 km^{2})
  - Land: 2.87 sq mi (7.44 km^{2})
  - Water: 0 sq mi (0.00 km^{2})
- Elevation: 781 ft (238 m)

Population (2020)
  - Total: 745
  - Density: 259.5/sq mi (100.19/km^{2})
- Time zone: UTC-6 (Central (CST))
  - Summer (DST): UTC-5 (CDT)
- ZIP code: 65655
- Area code: 417
- FIPS code: 29-26218
- GNIS feature ID: 0718308

Gainesville is a city in Ozark County, Missouri, United States. The population was 745 at the 2020 census. It is the county seat of Ozark County.

== History ==
Gainesville was platted in 1841, taking its name from Gainesville, Georgia, the native home of a large share of the early settlers. Gainesville was designated county seat of Ozark County in 1857. A post office called Gainesville has been in operation since 1860.

== Geography ==
Gainesville is located at the intersection of U.S. Route 160 and Missouri Route 5 in the Lick Creek valley. The southern terminus of Route 181 is at U.S Route 160, on the east side of town.

According to the United States Census Bureau, the city has a total area of 2.87 square miles (7.43 km^{2}), all land.

== Demographics ==
Historical population
Census	Pop.	Note	%±
1880	165		—
1890	175		6.1%
1900	222		26.9%
1910	195		−12.2%
1920	256		31.3%
1930	235		−8.2%
1940	255		8.5%
1950	309		21.2%
1960	266		−13.9%
1970	627		135.7%
1980	707		12.8%
1990	659		−6.8%
2000	632		−4.1%
2010	773		22.3%
2020	745		−3.6%
U.S. Decennial Census

=== 2010 census ===
As of the census of 2010, there were 773 people, 356 households, and 204 families living in the city. The population density was 269.3 inhabitants per square mile (104.0/km^{2}). There were 406 housing units at an average density of 141.5 per square mile (54.6/km^{2}). The racial makeup of the city was 96.51% White, 0.13% Black or African American, 1.42% Native American, 0.39% from other races, and 1.55% from two or more races. Hispanic or Latino of any race were 1.68% of the population.

There were 356 households, of which 28.1% had children under the age of 18 living with them, 41.3% were married couples living together, 11.0% had a female householder with no husband present, 5.1% had a male householder with no wife present, and 42.7% were non-families. 40.4% of all households were made up of individuals, and 20.8% had someone living alone who was 65 years of age or older. The average household size was 2.17 and the average family size was 2.86.

The median age in the city was 42.6 years. 22.4% of residents were under the age of 18; 8.3% were between the ages of 18 and 24; 22% were from 25 to 44; 28.2% were from 45 to 64; and 19.3% were 65 years of age or older. The gender makeup of the city was 46.6% male and 53.4% female.

=== 2000 census ===
As of the census of 2000, there were 632 people, 294 households, and 176 families living in the city. The population density was 239.3 inhabitants per square mile (92.4/km^{2}). There were 339 housing units at an average density of 128.3 per square mile (49.5/km^{2}). The racial makeup of the city was 98.73% White, 0.16% African American, 0.47% Native American, and 0.63% from two or more races. Hispanic or Latino of any race were 1.90% of the population.

There were 294 households, out of which 25.2% had children under the age of 18 living with them, 48.3% were married couples living together, 8.2% had a female householder with no husband present, and 40.1% were non-families. 37.8% of all households were made up of individuals, and 20.4% had someone living alone who was 65 years of age or older. The average household size was 2.15 and the average family size was 2.86.

In the city, the population was spread out, with 23.3% under the age of 18, 6.8% from 18 to 24, 24.7% from 25 to 44, 23.9% from 45 to 64, and 21.4% who were 65 years of age or older. The median age was 41 years. For every 100 females, there were 85.9 males. For every 100 females age 18 and over, there were 77.0 males.

The median income for a household in the city was $23,083, and the median income for a family was $32,019. Males had a median income of $22,188 versus $16,597 for females. The per capita income for the city was $14,566. About 12.8% of families and 18.4% of the population were below the poverty line, including 25.3% of those under age 18 and 20.0% of those age 65 or over.

== Education ==
Public education is provided by the Gainesville R-5 School District. The 61-acre campus includes the high school built in 1962, the junior high wing added in 1971, and the new elementary school completed in 1995. The school district covers 339 square miles and serves several rural communities including Thornfield, Wasola, Tecumseh, and Pontiac.

The Gainesville R-V School District is "fully accredited" and has A+ designation. Gainesville High School is unranked by U.S. News & World Report and has a graduation rate below the state median.
