= Ozark County, Missouri =

County in Missouri, United States

- County
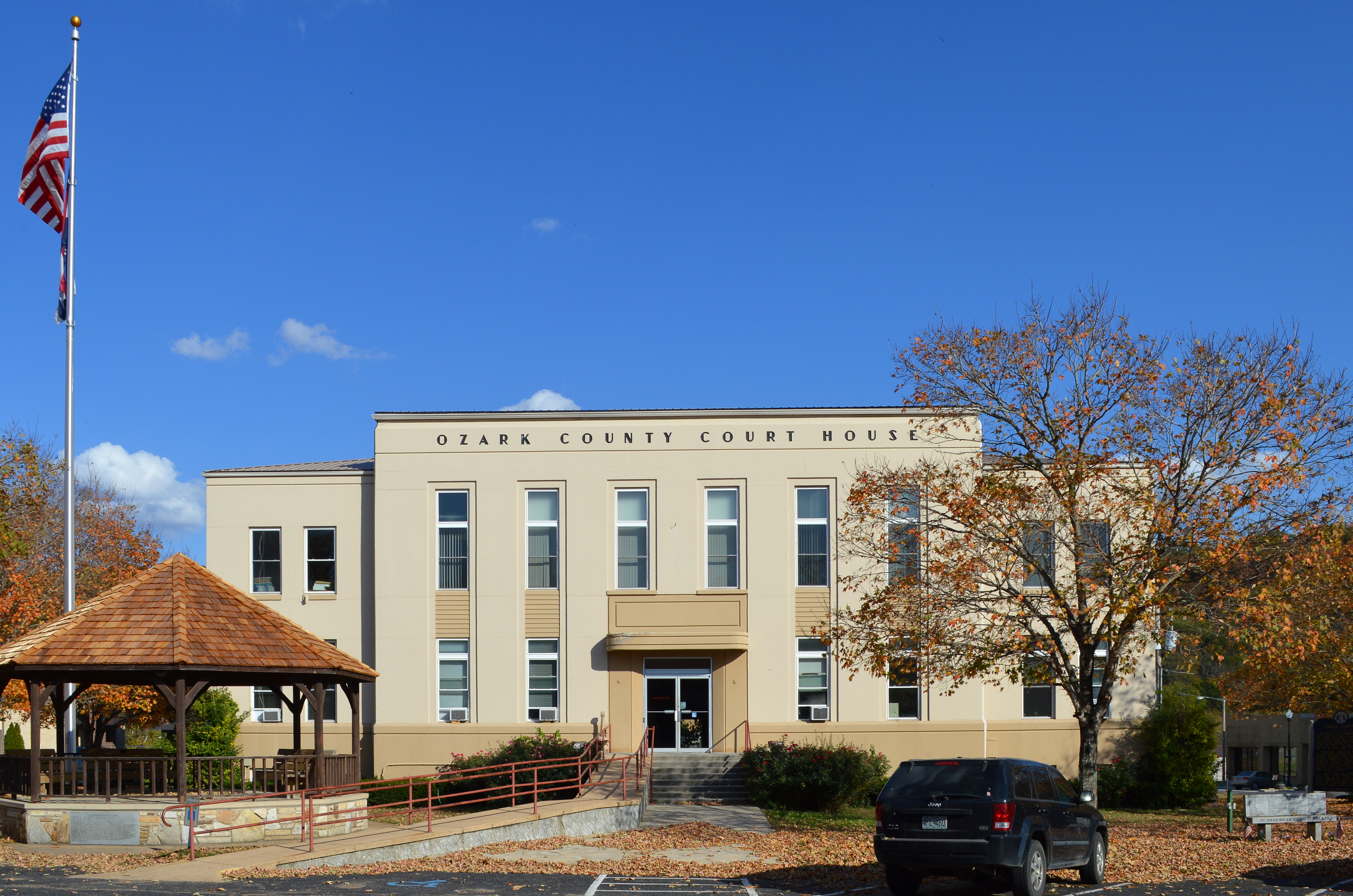
- Ozark County Courthouse in Gainesville

- Location within the U.S. state of Missouri
- Coordinates: 36°39′N 92°26′W
- Country: United States
- State: Missouri
- Founded: January 29, 1841
- Named for: Ozark Mountains
- Seat: Gainesville
- Largest city: Gainesville

Area
  - Total: 755 sq mi (1,960 km^{2})
  - Land: 745 sq mi (1,930 km^{2})
  - Water: 10 sq mi (26 km^{2}) 1.4%

Population (2020)
  - Total: 8,553
  - Estimate (2025): 9,172 ▲
  - Density: 11.5/sq mi (4.43/km^{2})
- Time zone: UTC−6 (Central)
  - Summer (DST): UTC−5 (CDT)
- Congressional district: 8th
- Website: www.mogenweb.org/ozark/

Ozark County is a county in the southern portion of the U.S. state of Missouri. The estimated 2025 population is 9,172. The largest city and county seat is Gainesville. The county was organized as Ozark County, named after the Ozark Mountains, on January 29, 1841. It was renamed Decatur County, after Commodore Stephen Decatur, from 1843 to 1845, after which the name Ozark County was restored.

== Geography ==
According to the U.S. Census Bureau, the county has a total area of 755 square miles (1,960 km^{2}), of which 745 square miles (1,930 km^{2}) is land and 10 square miles (26 km^{2}) (1.4%) is water. Arkansas is located to the south of Ozark County.

=== Adjacent counties ===
- Douglas County (north)
- Howell County (east)
- Fulton County, Arkansas (southeast)
- Baxter County, Arkansas (south)
- Marion County, Arkansas (southwest)
- Taney County (west)

==== Major highways ====
- U.S. Route 160
- Route 5
- Route 95
- Route 142
- Route 181

=== National protected area ===
- Mark Twain National Forest (part)

== Demographics ==
Historical population
Census	Pop.	Note	%±
1850	2,294		—
1860	2,447		6.7%
1870	3,363		37.4%
1880	5,618		67.1%
1890	9,795		74.4%
1900	12,145		24.0%
1910	11,926		−1.8%
1920	11,125		−6.7%
1930	9,537		−14.3%
1940	10,766		12.9%
1950	8,856		−17.7%
1960	6,744		−23.8%
1970	6,226		−7.7%
1980	7,961		27.9%
1990	8,598		8.0%
2000	9,542		11.0%
2010	9,723		1.9%
2020	8,553		−12.0%
2025 (est.)	9,172	▲	7.2%
U.S. Decennial Census; 1790-1960 1900-1990; 1990-2000 2010-2015

=== Racial and ethnic composition ===
Ozark County, Missouri – Racial and ethnic composition Note: the US Census treats Hispanic/Latino as an ethnic category. This table excludes Latinos from the racial categories and assigns them to a separate category. Hispanics/Latinos may be of any race.
Race / Ethnicity (NH = Non-Hispanic)	Pop 1980	Pop 1990	Pop 2000	Pop 2010	Pop 2020	% 1980	% 1990	% 2000	% 2010	% 2020
White alone (NH)	7,856	8,490	9,249	9,387	8,000	98.68%	98.74%	96.93%	96.54%	93.53%
Black or African American alone (NH)	1	2	14	11	19	0.01%	0.02%	0.15%	0.11%	0.22%
Native American or Alaska Native alone (NH)	41	35	59	58	38	0.52%	0.41%	0.62%	0.60%	0.44%
Asian alone (NH)	6	12	8	13	14	0.08%	0.14%	0.08%	0.13%	0.16%
Native Hawaiian or Pacific Islander alone (NH)	x	x	0	0	5	x	x	0.00%	0.00%	0.06%
Other race alone (NH)	4	3	2	2	41	0.05%	0.03%	0.02%	0.02%	0.48%
Mixed race or Multiracial (NH)	x	x	120	124	327	x	x	1.26%	1.28%	3.82%
Hispanic or Latino (any race)	53	56	90	128	109	0.67%	0.65%	0.94%	1.32%	1.27%
Total	7,961	8,598	9,542	9,723	8,553	100.00%	100.00%	100.00%	100.00%	100.00%

=== 2020 census ===
As of the 2020 census, the county had a population of 8,553. The median age was 51.9 years, 18.8% of residents were under the age of 18, and 28.1% of residents were 65 years of age or older. For every 100 females there were 100.9 males, and for every 100 females age 18 and over there were 98.7 males age 18 and over.

The racial makeup of the county was 93.9% White, 0.2% Black or African American, 0.5% American Indian and Alaska Native, 0.2% Asian, 0.1% Native Hawaiian and Pacific Islander, 0.7% from some other race, and 4.4% from two or more races. Hispanic or Latino residents of any race comprised 1.3% of the population.

Ozark County Racial Composition
Race	Num.	Perc.
White (NH)	8,000	93.5%
Black or African American (NH)	19	0.22%
Native American (NH)	38	0.44%
Asian (NH)	14	0.16%
Pacific Islander (NH)	5	0.06%
Other/Mixed (NH)	368	4.3%
Hispanic or Latino	109	1.27%

0.0% of residents lived in urban areas, while 100.0% lived in rural areas.

There were 3,759 households in the county, of which 22.2% had children under the age of 18 living with them and 22.1% had a female householder with no spouse or partner present. About 30.1% of all households were made up of individuals and 15.7% had someone living alone who was 65 years of age or older.

There were 5,025 housing units, of which 25.2% were vacant. Among occupied housing units, 80.5% were owner-occupied and 19.5% were renter-occupied. The homeowner vacancy rate was 2.4% and the rental vacancy rate was 9.8%.

=== 2000 census ===
As of the census of 2000, there were 9,542 people, 3,950 households, and 2,855 families residing in the county. The population density was 13 people per square mile (5.0 people/km^{2}). There were 5,114 housing units at an average density of 7 units per square mile (2.7/km^{2}). The racial makeup of the county was 97.57% White, 0.15% Black or African American, 0.65% Native American, 0.08% Asian, 0.19% from other races, and 1.36% from two or more races. Approximately 0.94% of the population were Hispanic or Latino of any race. Among the major first ancestries reported in Ozark County were 28.6% American, 15.9% German, 12.1% English, and 11.4% Irish.

There were 3,950 households, out of which 26.20% had children under the age of 18 living with them, 62.20% were married couples living together, 6.90% had a female householder with no husband present, and 27.70% were non-families. 24.40% of all households were made up of individuals, and 12.20% had someone living alone who was 65 years of age or older. The average household size was 2.40 and the average family size was 2.81.

In the county, the population was spread out, with 22.10% under the age of 18, 6.90% from 18 to 24, 22.80% from 25 to 44, 28.70% from 45 to 64, and 19.50% who were 65 years of age or older. The median age was 44 years. For every 100 females there were 98.10 males. For every 100 females age 18 and over, there were 96.30 males.

The median income for a household in the county was $31,508, and the median income for a family was $36,622. Males had a median income of $21,685 versus $17,312 for females. The per capita income for the county was $17,302. About 16.10% of families and 21.60% of the population were below the poverty line, including 30.80% of those under age 18 and 17.20% of those age 65 or over.

=== Religion ===
According to the Association of Religion Data Archives County Membership Report (2000), Ozark County is a part of the Bible Belt with evangelical Protestantism being the majority religion. The most predominant denominations among residents in Ozark County who adhere to a religion are Southern Baptists (25.79%), Churches of Christ (24.83%), and Pentecostals (17.07%).

== Education ==
Of adults 25 years of age and older in Ozark County, 73.0% possesses a high school diploma or higher while 8.3% holds a bachelor's degree or higher as their highest educational attainment.

=== Public schools ===
- Thornfield R-I School District - Thornfield - (K-08)
- Lutie R-VI School District - Theodosia
  - Lutie Elementary School (K-06)
  - Lutie High School (07-12)
- Gainesville R-V School District - Gainesville
  - Gainesville Elementary School (K-06)
  - Gainesville High School (07-12)
- Dora R-III School District - Dora
  - Dora Elementary School (K-06)
  - Dora High School (07-12)
- Bakersfield R-IV School District - Bakersfield
  - Bakersfield Elementary School (PK-05)
  - Bakersfield High School (06-12)

=== Public libraries ===
The county has a library in Gainesville, the Ozark County Library. It's completely run by volunteers, and open 5 days a week.

== Politics ==
=== Local ===
The Republican Party predominantly controls politics at the local level in Ozark County. Republicans hold all of the elected positions in the county.

Ozark County, Missouri

Elected countywide officials
Assessor	Jama Berry	Republican
Circuit Clerk	Jackie Smith	Republican
County Clerk	Brian Wise	Republican
Collector	Darla Sullivan	Republican
Commissioner (presiding)	Terry Newton	Republican
Commissioner (district 1)	Gary Collins	Republican
Commissioner (district 2)	Layne Nance	Republican
Coroner	Gene Britt	Republican
Prosecuting Attorney	Lee Pipkins	Republican
Public Administrator	Melinda Abraham	Republican
Recorder	Jackie Smith	Republican
Sheriff	Cass Martin	Republican
Surveyor	Matt Wade	Republican
Treasurer	Christy Thompson	Republican

=== State ===
All of Ozark County is a part of Missouri's 155th District in the Missouri House of Representatives and is represented by Travis Smith (R-Dora).

Missouri House of Representatives — District 155 — Ozark County (2016)
Party	Candidate	Votes	%	±%
Republican	Lyle Rowland	3,799	100.00%	

Missouri House of Representatives — District 155 — Ozark County (2014)
Party	Candidate	Votes	%	±%
Republican	Lyle Rowland	2,257	100.00%	

Missouri House of Representatives — District 155 — Ozark County (2012)
Party	Candidate	Votes	%	±%
Republican	Lyle Rowland	3,591	100.00%	

All of Ozark County is a part of Missouri's 33rd District in the Missouri Senate and is currently represented by Carla Eslinger (R-Wasola).

Missouri Senate — District 33 — Ozark County (2016)
Party	Candidate	Votes	%	±%
Republican	Mike Cunningham	3,787	100.00%	

Missouri Senate — District 33 — Ozark County (2012)
Party	Candidate	Votes	%	±%
Republican	Mike Cunningham	3,608	100.00%	

=== Federal ===
U.S. Senate — Missouri — Ozark County (2016)
Party	Candidate	Votes	%	±%
Republican	Roy Blunt	3,085	69.02%	+19.04
Democratic	Jason Kander	1,113	24.90%	−17.45
Libertarian	Jonathan Dine	126	2.82%	−4.85
Green	Johnathan McFarland	70	1.56%	+1.56
Constitution	Fred Ryman	76	1.70%	+1.70

U.S. Senate — Missouri — Ozark County (2012)
Party	Candidate	Votes	%	±%
Republican	Todd Akin	2,202	49.98%	
Democratic	Claire McCaskill	1,866	42.35%	
Libertarian	Jonathan Dine	338	7.67%	

Ozark County is included in Missouri's 8th Congressional District and is currently represented by Jason T. Smith (R-Salem) in the U.S. House of Representatives. Smith won a special election on Tuesday, June 4, 2013, to finish out the remaining term of U.S. Representative Jo Ann Emerson (R-Cape Girardeau). Emerson announced her resignation a month after being reelected with over 70 percent of the vote in the district. She resigned to become CEO of the National Rural Electric Cooperative.

U.S. House of Representatives — Missouri's 8th Congressional District — Ozark County (2016)
Party	Candidate	Votes	%	±%
Republican	Jason T. Smith	3,478	80.11%	+9.61
Democratic	Dave Cowell	723	16.61%	−0.85
Libertarian	Jonathan Shell	143	3.28%	+1.09

U.S. House of Representatives — Missouri's 8th Congressional District — Ozark County (2014)
Party	Candidate	Votes	%	±%
Republican	Jason T. Smith	1,833	70.50%	−1.54
Democratic	Barbara Stocker	454	17.46%	−2.04
Libertarian	Rick Vandeven	57	2.19%	−0.97
Constitution	Doug Enyart	33	1.27%	−4.03
Independent	Terry Hampton	223	8.58%	+8.58

U.S. House of Representatives — Missouri's 8th Congressional District — Special Election — Ozark County (2013)
Party	Candidate	Votes	%	±%
Republican	Jason T. Smith	639	72.04%	−3.05
Democratic	Steve Hodges	173	19.50%	−1.36
Libertarian	Bill Slantz	28	3.16%	−0.89
Constitution	Doug Enyart	47	5.30%	+5.30

U.S. House of Representatives — Missouri's 8th Congressional District — Ozark County (2012)
Party	Candidate	Votes	%	±%
Republican	Jo Ann Emerson	3,264%	75.09%	
Democratic	Jack Rushin	907	20.86%	
Libertarian	Rick Vandeven	176	4.05%	

Past Gubernatorial Elections Results
Year	Republican	Democratic	Third Parties
2024	82.77% 3,886	15.57% 731	1.66% 78
2020	82.25% 3,963	15.96% 769	1.78% 86
2016	68.66% 3,078	27.39% 1,228	3.95% 177
2012	52.63% 2,334	43.92% 1,948	3.45% 153
2008	42.47% 1,967	53.63% 2,484	3.90% 181
2004	63.04% 2,949	34.80% 1,628	2.16% 101
2000	58.65% 2,502	38.54% 1,644	2.81% 120
1996	59.15% 2,376	38.16% 1,533	2.69% 108
1992	53.21% 2,222	46.79% 1,954	0.00% 0
1988	74.47% 2,721	25.18% 920	0.36% 13
1984	74.92% 2,742	25.08% 918	0.00% 0
1980	61.61% 2,287	38.20% 1,418	0.19% 7
1976	61.76% 1,886	38.21% 1,167	0.03% 1

==== Political culture ====
United States presidential election results for Ozark County, Missouri
Year	Republican		Democratic		Third party(ies)	
Year	No.	%	No.	%	No.	%
1888	884	59.13%	434	29.03%	177	11.84%
1892	881	57.24%	387	25.15%	271	17.61%
1896	1,187	53.47%	1,025	46.17%	8	0.36%
1900	1,272	63.28%	695	34.58%	43	2.14%
1904	1,305	68.00%	556	28.97%	58	3.02%
1908	1,233	65.76%	594	31.68%	48	2.56%
1912	695	32.69%	575	27.05%	856	40.26%
1916	1,331	65.89%	654	32.38%	35	1.73%
1920	2,457	79.72%	569	18.46%	56	1.82%
1924	1,758	69.05%	688	27.02%	100	3.93%
1928	2,616	82.68%	529	16.72%	19	0.60%
1932	1,730	55.70%	1,358	43.72%	18	0.58%
1936	2,981	68.47%	1,359	31.21%	14	0.32%
1940	3,421	77.66%	965	21.91%	19	0.43%
1944	2,707	81.10%	628	18.81%	3	0.09%
1948	1,967	69.46%	859	30.33%	6	0.21%
1952	2,572	77.73%	734	22.18%	3	0.09%
1956	2,141	70.71%	887	29.29%	0	0.00%
1960	2,595	78.26%	721	21.74%	0	0.00%
1964	1,540	59.14%	1,064	40.86%	0	0.00%
1968	1,967	68.37%	606	21.06%	304	10.57%
1972	2,119	77.22%	625	22.78%	0	0.00%
1976	1,754	56.49%	1,341	43.19%	10	0.32%
1980	2,434	64.56%	1,242	32.94%	94	2.49%
1984	2,614	70.19%	1,110	29.81%	0	0.00%
1988	2,404	64.21%	1,329	35.50%	11	0.29%
1992	1,772	41.49%	1,581	37.02%	918	21.49%
1996	1,882	47.18%	1,445	36.22%	662	16.60%
2000	2,663	62.05%	1,432	33.36%	197	4.59%
2004	3,083	65.50%	1,561	33.16%	63	1.34%
2008	2,918	62.27%	1,661	35.45%	107	2.28%
2012	3,080	69.17%	1,261	28.32%	112	2.52%
2016	3,639	80.78%	724	16.07%	142	3.15%
2020	4,064	83.55%	752	15.46%	48	0.99%
2024	4,044	84.60%	698	14.60%	38	0.79%

Like most counties situated in Southwest Missouri, Ozark County is a Republican stronghold in presidential elections. George W. Bush carried Ozark County in 2000 and 2004 by convincing two-to-one margins. Like many other rural counties throughout Missouri, Ozark County favored John McCain over Barack Obama in 2008. No Democratic presidential nominee has won Ozark County since 1860.

Like most rural areas throughout the Bible Belt in Southwest Missouri, voters in Ozark County traditionally adhere to socially and culturally conservative principles which tend to influence their Republican leanings. In 2004, Missourians voted on a constitutional amendment to define marriage as the union between a man and a woman—it overwhelmingly passed Ozark County with 82.18 percent of the vote. The initiative passed the state with 71 percent of support from voters as Missouri became the first state to ban same-sex marriage. In 2006, Missourians voted on a constitutional amendment to fund and legalize embryonic stem cell research in the state—it narrowly failed in Ozark County with 51.07 percent voting against the measure. The initiative narrowly passed the state with 51 percent of support from voters as Missouri became one of the first states in the nation to approve embryonic stem cell research. Despite Ozark County's longstanding tradition of supporting socially conservative platforms, voters in the county have a penchant for advancing populist causes like increasing the minimum wage. In 2006, Missourians voted on a proposition (Proposition B) to increase the minimum wage in the state to $6.50 an hour—it passed Ozark County with 76.94 percent of the vote. The proposition strongly passed every single county in Missouri with 78.99 percent voting in favor as the minimum wage was increased to $6.50 an hour in the state. During the same election, voters in five other states also strongly approved increases in the minimum wage.

=== Missouri presidential preference primary (2008) ===
In the 2008 presidential primary, voters in Ozark County from both political parties supported candidates who finished in second place in the state at large and nationally. Former Governor Mike Huckabee (R-Arkansas) received more votes, a total of 766, than any candidate from either party in Ozark County during the 2008 presidential primary.

== Communities ==
=== City ===
- Gainesville (county seat)

=== Villages ===
- Bakersfield
- Theodosia

=== Census-designated places ===
- Pontiac
- Sundown
- Wasola

=== Unincorporated communities ===
- Almartha
- Brixey
- Dora
- Dugginsville
- Elijah
- Foil
- Hammond
- Hardenville
- Howards Ridge
- Isabella
- Longrun
- Lutie
- Mammoth
- Noble
- Nottinghill
- Ocie
- Rockbridge
- Romance
- Souder
- Sycamore
- Tecumseh
- Thornfield
- Trail
- Udall
- Willhoit
- Zanoni

== See also ==
- National Register of Historic Places listings in Ozark County, Missouri
