= Mingo Wilderness =

Wilderness area in Missouri, United States

- IUCN category Ib (wilderness area)
- Location within the United States
- Location: Wayne / Stoddard counties, Missouri, USA
- Nearest city: Puxico, Missouri
- Coordinates: 36°58′01″N 90°12′52″W
- Area: 8,000 acres (3,200 ha)
- Established: 1976
- Governing body: U.S. Fish and Wildlife Service

Mingo Wilderness is an 8,000 acre (32 km^{2}) U.S. Wilderness Area located in southeastern Missouri in the Mingo National Wildlife Refuge. It was established and governed under the Wilderness Act of 1964. While the public is invited to engage in recreational opportunities such as fishing, hiking, canoeing, and wildlife observation, all uses are primitive and nondestructive and all access is by either foot traffic or nonmotorized boat.

A special auto tour that runs around the perimeter of the Wilderness Area is open on Saturdays and Sundays in April, October, and November.

The following specific activities are permitted in the Wilderness Area:

- Hiking and backpacking: Most hiking is associated with and used as the means to accomplish other activities such as wildlife observation, berry picking, or fishing. There are no established hiking trails in the Wilderness Area.
- Fishing: Most fishing is done from small boats and canoes or from the bank. Fishing pressure is usually heaviest during the spring and summer months, especially on week-ends. Boat motors are prohibited in the Wilderness Area.
- Wildlife Observation: Wildlife and wild lands observation is a popular activity in the Wilderness Area. Deer, wild turkey, raccoon, migratory birds and other wildlife are readily seen in this area.
- Environmental Education and Interpretation: groups such as school and college classes are allowed to use the Wilderness area for educational purposes.

== See also ==
- Bell Mountain Wilderness
- Devils Backbone Wilderness
- Hercules-Glades Wilderness
- Irish Wilderness
- Paddy Creek Wilderness
- Piney Creek Wilderness
- Rockpile Mountain Wilderness
- Mingo National Wildlife Refuge
