= M. tigris =

M. tigris may refer to:

- Maniho tigris, a spider species in the genus Maniho
- Microlophus tigris, a lizard species in the genus Microlophus
- Mycteroperca tigris, a fish species

== See also ==
- Tigris (disambiguation)
