= Mingo (disambiguation) =

Mingo is the name of a Native American tribe and the tribe's language.

Mingo may also refer to:

== Place names ==
In the United States:

- Mingo, Iowa
- Mingo, Kansas
- Mingo, Mississippi
- Mingo, Missouri
- Mingo, Ohio
- Mingo County, West Virginia
- Mingo, North Carolina in Sampson County, North Carolina
- Mingo, West Virginia in Randolph County, West Virginia
- Black Mingo Creek, a creek in South Carolina
- Mingo Junction, Ohio
- Mingo National Wildlife Refuge, Missouri
  - Mingo Wilderness, Missouri, in the Mingo National Wildlife Refuge
- Mingo Run, a stream in West Virginia
- Mingo Creek (disambiguation)

== Other uses ==
- Mingo (footballer) (born 1977), Spanish footballer
- Mingo Sanders (1857–1929), American soldier involved in the Brownsville affair
- Alan Mingo Jr., American musical theater actor
- Barkevious Mingo (born 1990), American football player
- Jonathan Mingo (born 2001), American football player
- Lucy Mingo (born 1931), American quilt maker
- Norman Mingo (1896–1980), artist best known for his association with MAD Magazine
- USS Mingo, the name of two ships in the United States Navy
- Mingo Oak, until 1934, considered the largest and oldest white oak in the U.S., formerly in West Virginia
- Mingo snapper, another name for the Vermilion Snapper (Rhomboplites aurorubens), a fish of the Caribbean with rough leathery skin
- Mingo, a city in the Flash Gordon comic strip
- Mingo, a character in the television series Daniel Boone, played by actor Ed Ames
- Mingo, a character in the 1935 opera Porgy and Bess
- Dr. Mingo, a mad scientist character in Chuck Chicken (Malaysian animated tv series 2015)
