= Beaver Creek (White River tributary) =

Stream in Missouri, U.S.

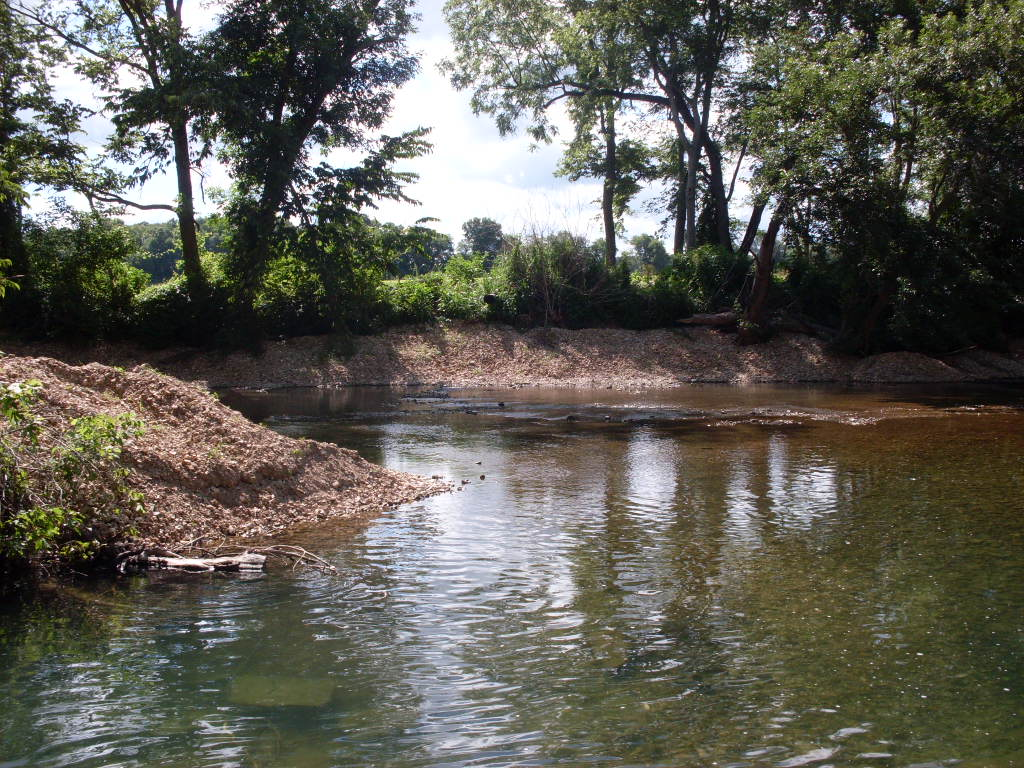
- The junction of Beaver and Cowskin creeks west of Arno in Douglas County. Looking southeast from Beaver Creek bridge, Cowskin entering from behind gravel bar on the left.

Location
- Country: United States
- State: Missouri
- Region: Douglas, Webster and Taney counties

Physical characteristics
- Source
  - coordinates: 37°04′18″N 92°43′12″W
- Mouth
  - coordinates: 36°38′18″N 93°02′25″W
  - elevation: 643 ft (196 m)
- Discharge
  - location: Bradleyville
  - average: 301 cu/ft. per sec.

Basin features
- Tributaries
  - left: Honey Creek, Cowskin Creek, Brushy Creek, Long Creek
  - right: Little Beaver Creek

Beaver Creek is a stream in western Douglas and eastern Taney counties of Missouri. It is a tributary to the White River of northern Arkansas.

== Description ==
The creek was named due to the presence of beaver dams.

The headwaters of Beaver Creek arise in northern Douglas County and extreme southeast Webster County northwest of Ava and southeast of Seymour. The stream flows south and southwest to join the White River southeast of Forsyth and south of Kissee Mills below the Lake Taneycomo powersite dam.

The stream headwaters arise in SE Webster County and it joins the White River in Taney County.

Just to the east of the old store building at Tigris, Beaver is crossed by Missouri Route 14 and a short distance to the south is joined by Honey Creek. The stream flows past Arno where Cowskin and Prairie creeks join it. Further south at Rome it is joined by Spring Creek. To the southwest of Rome, Beaver enters Taney County at Brownbranch. Past Brownbranch it flows west into the Mark Twain National Forest and is joined by Little Beaver Creek just north of Bradleyville. Beyond Bradleyville the Beaver flows through incised meanders past the Hercules Glades Wilderness area. At Kissee Mills Park the Beaver passes under US 160 and enters Bull Shoals Lake a short distance south at Beaver Creek Park.

The drainage basin of the Beaver and its tributary streams encompasses an area of 267,344 acres (108,190 ha).
