= S. tigris =

S. tigris may refer to:

- Scoturius tigris, a jumping spider species
- Sepia tigris, a cuttlefish species
- Spariolenus tigris, a huntsman spider species in the genus Spariolenus

== See also ==
- Tigris (disambiguation)
