= Tigris (disambiguation) =

The Tigris is the eastern member of the two great rivers that define Mesopotamia.

Tigris may also refer to:

== Astronomy ==
- 13096 Tigris, an outer main-belt asteroid
- River Tigris (constellation), also known as Tigris, a constellation

== Places ==
- The Bocca Tigris, a historical name for the Humen strait
- Tigris, Missouri, a community in the United States

== Ships ==
- HMS Tigris, the name of a number of ships of the Royal Navy
- Tigris (ship) – any of several vessels by that name
- The reed boat Tigris used in Thor Heyerdahl's expedition

== Other uses ==
- Cypraea tigris, or tiger cowrie, a type of sea snail
- Einsatzgruppe TIGRIS, a Swiss police force
- Panthera tigris (tiger)
- Tigris, a character in The Hunger Games
- Tigris (roller coaster), a roller coaster at Busch Gardens Tampa
- Tigris (Tiger), one of the dogs of the hunter Actaeon. Like the rest of the pack, he also devoured his master when he was transformed into a stag by Artemis, goddess of the hunt.
- Zilan Tigris, a Turkish singer

== See also ==
- Tigress (disambiguation)
- Tigri, a town in India
