= Long Creek (Beaver Creek tributary) =

Missouri waterway

Long Creek is a stream in Taney County in the Ozarks of southwest Missouri. It is a tributary of Beaver Creek.

The stream headwaters are at 36°40′37″N 92°52′32″W and the confluence with Beaver Creek is at 36°41′09″N 92°59′02″W.

The source area for Long Creek lies adjacent to Missouri Route 125 south of the Hercules community and the Hercules Fire Tower. The stream flows west entering the Hercules Glades Wilderness. The stream exits the wilderness just prior to entering Beaver Creek at the north edge of Bull Shoals Lake.
