= Brushy Creek (Beaver Creek tributary) =

Stream in the American state of Missouri

Coordinates: 36°43′21″N 92°57′41″W

Brushy Creek is a stream in eastern Taney County in the Ozarks of southern Missouri.

The stream source is in extreme eastern Taney County at coordinates: and its confluence with Beaver Creek is about 9.5 mi (15.3 km) to the west at coordinates: . The stream intersects Missouri Route 125 just south of Hercules and runs northwest parallel to that road for a short distance before turning west again. West of Hercules the stream flows just to the north of the boundary of Hercules Glades Wilderness and enters Beaver Creek just north of the wilderness area.

== History ==
The stream was named Brushy because of the dense brush along its banks.
