= Hercules, Missouri =

Unincorporated community in Missouri, U.S.

Coordinates: 36°42′27″N 92°52′23″W

Hercules is an unincorporated community in Taney County, in the Ozarks of southern Missouri. Hercules is located on Missouri Route 125, south of Bradleyville and just northeast of the Hercules Glades Wilderness protected area. The townsite is adjacent to Brushy Creek and within the Mark Twain National Forest.

== History ==
A post office called Hercules was established in 1899, and remained in operation until 1935. According to tradition, the area was so named because its difficult terrain was as formidable as Hercules.
