= Mingo, Missouri =

Unincorporated community in Missouri, U.S.

Coordinates: 36°56′14″N 90°12′00″W

Mingo is an unincorporated community in Stoddard County, in the U.S. state of Missouri.

== History ==
A variant name was "Grindle". A post office called Grindle was established in 1895, and closed in 1898. The post office reopened as Mingo in 1899, and was discontinued in 1952. The present name is derived from nearby Mingo Swamp.
