= Casto Creek =

- Location of the mouth within Missouri

Location
- Country: United States
- State: Missouri
- Region: Douglas County

Physical characteristics
- Source
  - coordinates: 37°03′14″N 92°39′42″W
  - elevation: Approximately 1,470 ft (450 m)
- Mouth
  - coordinates: 36°59′14″N 92°42′11″W.
  - elevation: 1,109 ft (338 m)

Casto Creek is a stream in northwest Douglas County, Missouri. The headwaters of Casto Creek are north of Ava within one half mile of the Douglas - Wright county line. The stream flows south roughly paralleling Missouri Route B then turns to the southwest west of the community of Mount Zion. The stream continues to the southwest meeting its confluence with Cowskin Creek just north of Missouri Route 14 about three miles west of Ava.

Casto Creek has the name of the local Casto family which settled near it.

== See also ==
- List of rivers of Missouri
