= Rockpile Mountain Wilderness =

Wilderness area in Missouri, United States

- IUCN category Ib (wilderness area)
- Location within the United States
- Location: Madison County, Missouri, United States
- Nearest city: Fredericktown, MO
- Coordinates: 37°25′31″N 90°25′17″W
- Area: 4,238 acres (1,715 ha)
- Established: 1980
- Governing body: U.S. Forest Service

The Rockpile Mountain Wilderness is a wilderness area in the U.S. state of Missouri in Mark Twain National Forest. It takes its name from an ancient circle of granite rock, piled by some earlier man on top of the mountain. The namesake rock pile most likely was an Indian cairn. It is located in Madison County, Missouri, southeast of Bell Mountain and southwest of Fredericktown, Missouri. The area is primarily a broken ridge, having steep rocky slopes running from Little Grass Mountain on the north to the National Forest boundary four miles to the south.

== See also ==
- Bell Mountain Wilderness
- Devils Backbone Wilderness
- Hercules-Glades Wilderness
- Irish Wilderness
- Paddy Creek Wilderness
- Piney Creek Wilderness
