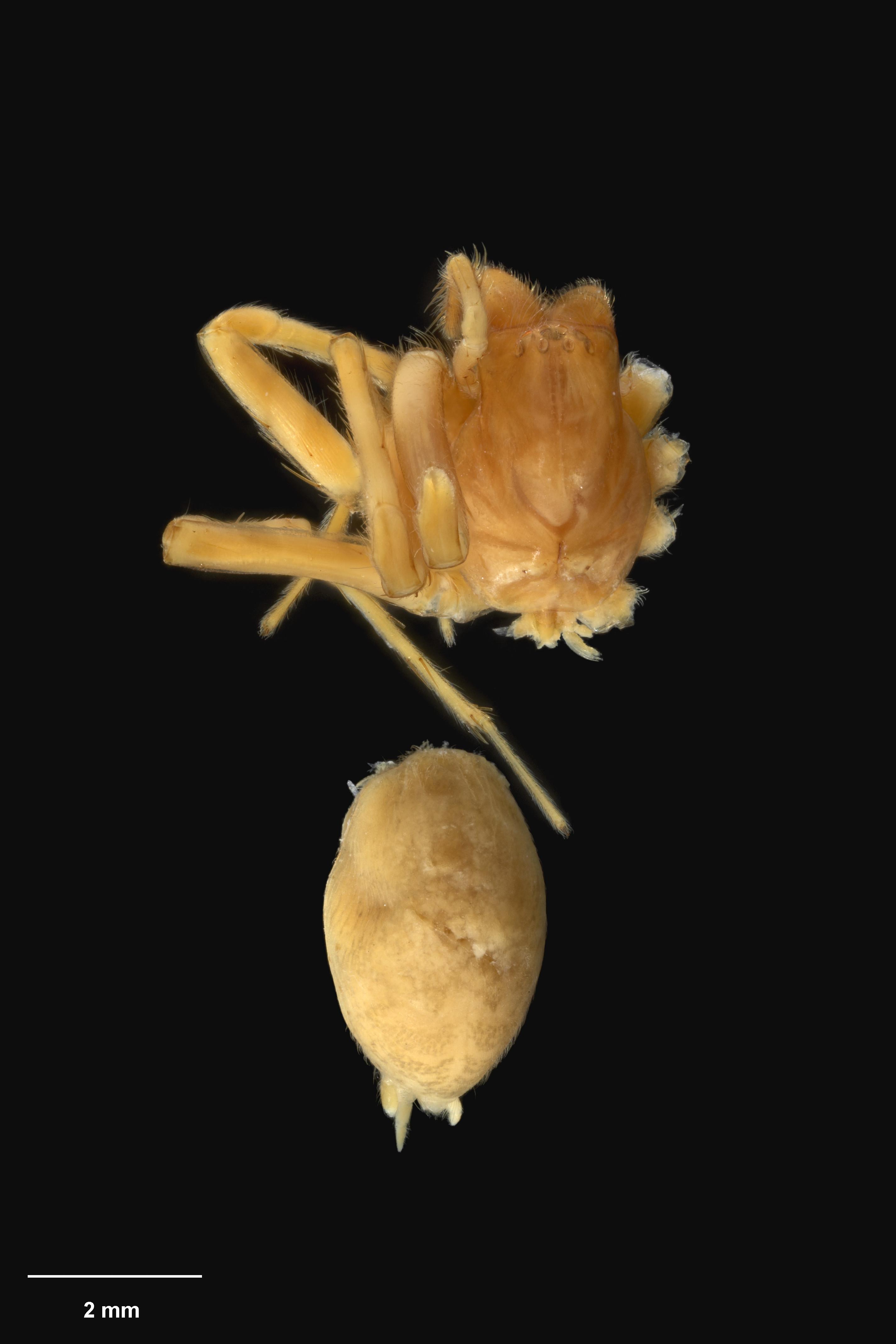

Conservation status
- Naturally Uncommon (NZ TCS)

Scientific classification
- Kingdom: Animalia
- Phylum: Arthropoda
- Subphylum: Chelicerata
- Class: Arachnida
- Order: Araneae
- Infraorder: Araneomorphae
- Family: Desidae
- Genus: Maniho
- Species: M. insulanus

Binomial name
- Maniho insulanus Forster & Wilton, 1973

= Maniho insulanus =

Species of spider

Maniho insulanus is a species of spider in the family Desidae that is endemic to New Zealand.

== Taxonomy ==
This species was described by Ray Forster and Cecil Wilton in 1973 from a female specimen. The holotype is stored in Te Papa Museum under registration number AS.000055.

== Description ==
The female is recorded at 7.5mm in length.

== Distribution ==
This species is only known from Cuvier Island, New Zealand.

== Conservation status ==
Under the New Zealand Threat Classification System, this species is listed as "Naturally Uncommon" with the qualifiers of "Island Endemic" and "One Location".
