= Spariolenus taprobanicus =

Scientific classification
- Kingdom: Animalia
- Phylum: Arthropoda
- Subphylum: Chelicerata
- Class: Arachnida
- Order: Araneae
- Infraorder: Araneomorphae
- Family: Sparassidae
- Genus: Spariolenus
- Species: S. taprobanicus

Binomial name
- Spariolenus taprobanicus (Walckenaer, 1837)

Species of spider

Spariolenus taprobanicus, is a species of spider of the genus Spariolenus. It is endemic to Sri Lanka.
