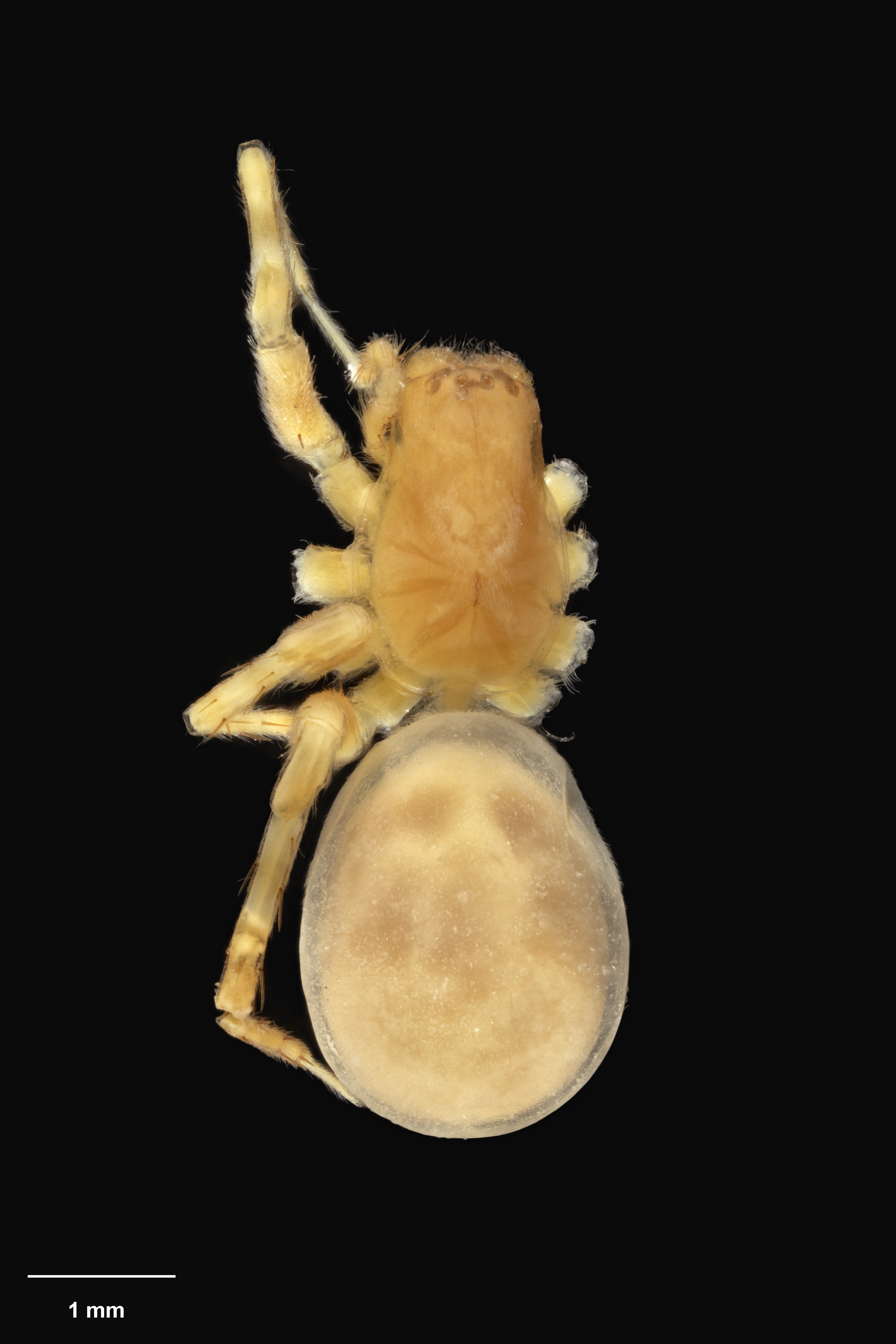

Conservation status
- Data Deficit (NZ TCS)

Scientific classification
- Kingdom: Animalia
- Phylum: Arthropoda
- Subphylum: Chelicerata
- Class: Arachnida
- Order: Araneae
- Infraorder: Araneomorphae
- Family: Desidae
- Genus: Maniho
- Species: M. australis

Binomial name
- Maniho australis Forster & Wilton, 1973

= Maniho australis =

Species of spider

Maniho australis is a species of Desidae that is endemic to New Zealand.

== Taxonomy ==
This species was described by Ray Forster and Cecil Wilton in 1973 from male and female specimens. The holotype is stored in Te Papa Museum under registration number AS.000010.

== Description ==
The male is recorded at 6.1mm in length whereas the female is 6.8mm.

== Distribution ==
This species is only known from Stewart Island, New Zealand.

== Conservation status ==
Under the New Zealand Threat Classification System, this species is listed as "Data Deficient" with the qualifiers of "Data Poor: Size" and "Data Poor: Trend".
