= Winona Ranger Station Historic District =

Historic district in Missouri, United States

- U.S. National Register of Historic Places
- U.S. Historic district
- Location within Missouri Location within the United States
- Location: Rte 1, MO 19N, Winona, Missouri
- Coordinates: 37°00′49″N 91°19′16″W
- Area: 13.1 acres (5.3 ha)
- Built: 1938
- Built by: Civilian Conservation Corps
- Architectural style: Colonial Revival
- MPS: Mark Twain National Forest MPS
- NRHP reference No.: 03000715
- Added to NRHP: August 4, 2003

Winona Ranger Station Historic District is a historic ranger station and national historic district located in Mark Twain National Forest near Winona, Shannon County, Missouri. The district encompasses four contributing buildings, associated with a ranger station constructed by the Civilian Conservation Corps (CCC) under the supervision of a Works Progress Administration (WPA) project. It developed between 1938 and 1938 and includes 1 1/2-story, Colonial Revival style ranger's dwelling, garage, warehouse, and oil house.

It was listed on the National Register of Historic Places in 2003.
