= Cowskin Creek =

Stream in the American state of Missouri

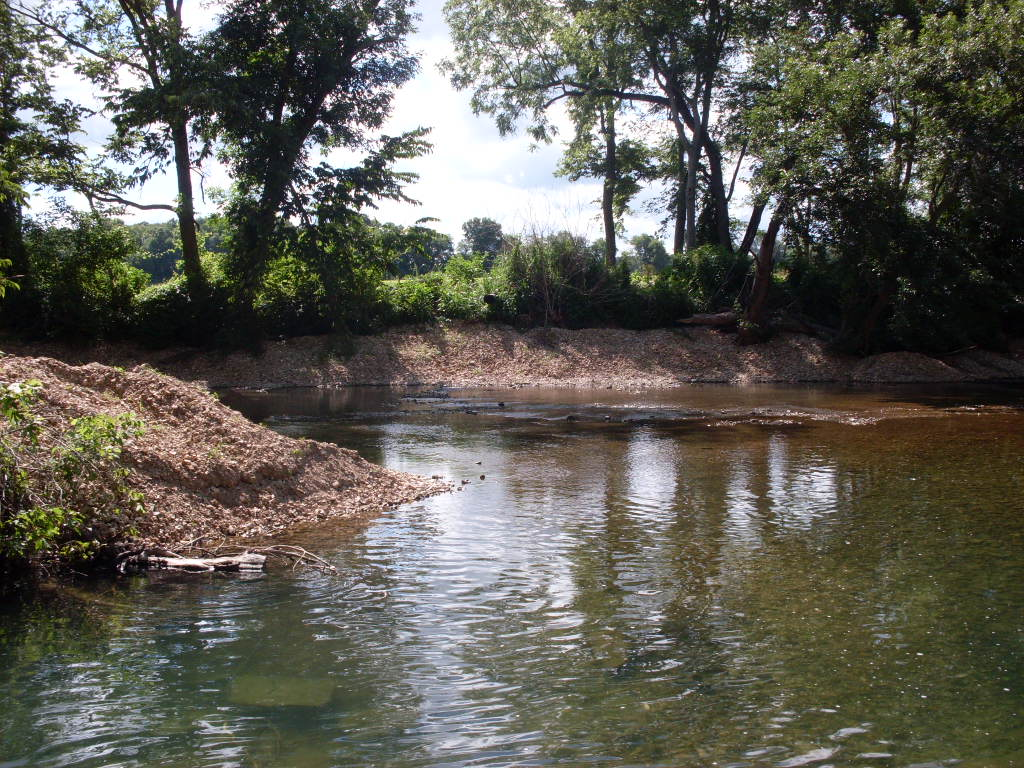
- The junction of Beaver and Cowskin creeks west of Arno. Looking southeast from Beaver Creek bridge, Cowskin entering from behind gravel bar on the left.

Location
- Country: United States
- State: Missouri
- Region: Douglas and Webster counties

Physical characteristics
- Source
  - coordinates: 37°05′31″N 92°41′48″W
  - elevation: Approximately 1,400 ft (430 m)
- Mouth
  - coordinates: 36°56′19″N 92°44′31″W
  - elevation: 1,040 ft (320 m)

Basin features
- Tributaries
  - left: Casto Creek, Prairie Creek

Cowskin Creek is a stream in northwest Douglas and extreme southeastern Webster counties of Missouri. Cowskin has its headwaters in southeast Webster County west of Cedar Gap and is a tributary to Beaver Creek which it joins just west of the Arno store. The stream is bridged by Missouri Route 14 just east of the junction with Missouri Route K.

According to tradition, a pioneer citizen skinned cows who had died of disease near this creek.

== See also ==
- List of rivers of Missouri
