= Honey Creek (Beaver Creek tributary) =

Location
- Country: United States
- State: Missouri
- Region: Douglas County

Physical characteristics
- Source
  - coordinates: 37°03′24″N 92°43′12″W
  - elevation: 1,550 ft (470 m)
- Mouth
  - coordinates: 36°59′54″N 92°45′19″W
  - elevation: 1,125 ft (343 m)

Honey Creek is a stream in Douglas County in the Ozarks of southern Missouri. It is a tributary of Beaver Creek.

The headwaters of the stream are in northwest Douglas County just to the west of Missouri Route K and about one-half mile south of the Douglas–Webster County line. The stream flows south to south-southwest parallel to County Road 14-531. It flows under Missouri Route 14 to its confluence with Beaver Creek five miles northwest of Ava.

The stream was named for the abundant honey bearing bee trees along its banks.
