= Tigri =

Tigri may refer to:

- Tigri, Bhiwani, village in the Bhiwani district of the Indian state of Haryana
- Tigri, Delhi, census town, near Khanpur in South district in the National Capital Territory of Delhi, India
- Tigri Area, forested area in the East Berbice-Corentyne region of Guyana, disputed by Suriname
  - Camp Tigri, a Guyanese military base in the Tigri Area
- Atto Tigri (1813–1875), Italian anatomist born in Pistoia
- Pascal Tigri, Beninese military officer

== See also ==
- Tigris (disambiguation)
