= Maniho vulgaris =

Conservation status
- Not Threatened (NZ TCS)

Scientific classification
- Kingdom: Animalia
- Phylum: Arthropoda
- Subphylum: Chelicerata
- Class: Arachnida
- Order: Araneae
- Infraorder: Araneomorphae
- Family: Desidae
- Genus: Maniho
- Species: M. vulgaris

Binomial name
- Maniho vulgaris Forster & Wilton, 1973

Species of spider

Maniho vulgaris is a species of spider in the family Desidae that is endemic to New Zealand.

== Taxonomy ==
This species was described by Ray Forster and Cecil Wilton in 1973 from female and male specimens. The holotype is stored in Otago Museum.

== Description ==
The female is recorded at 10.2mm in length whereas the male is 7.5mm.

== Distribution ==
This species is known from the southern half of New Zealand's North Island.

== Conservation status ==
Under the New Zealand Threat Classification System, this species is listed as "Not Threatened".
