= Prairie Creek (Cowskin Creek tributary) =

Stream in the American state of Missouri

Location
- Country: United States
- State: Missouri
- Region: Douglas County

Physical characteristics
- Source
  - coordinates: 36°58′03″N 92°39′30″W
- Mouth
  - coordinates: 36°56′19″N 92°44′31″W
  - elevation: 1,040 ft (320 m)

Prairie Creek is a stream in the west central Douglas County, Missouri. It is a tributary of Cowskin Creek. The stream headwaters are just north of the Ava city limits. It flows south through the west part of the city then turns southwest to west. The stream passes under routes 14 and 5 within west Ava. The confluence with Cowskin Creek is just east of Arno about four miles west-southwest of Ava.

Prairie Creek was named for the prairie land along its course.

== See also ==
- List of rivers of Missouri
