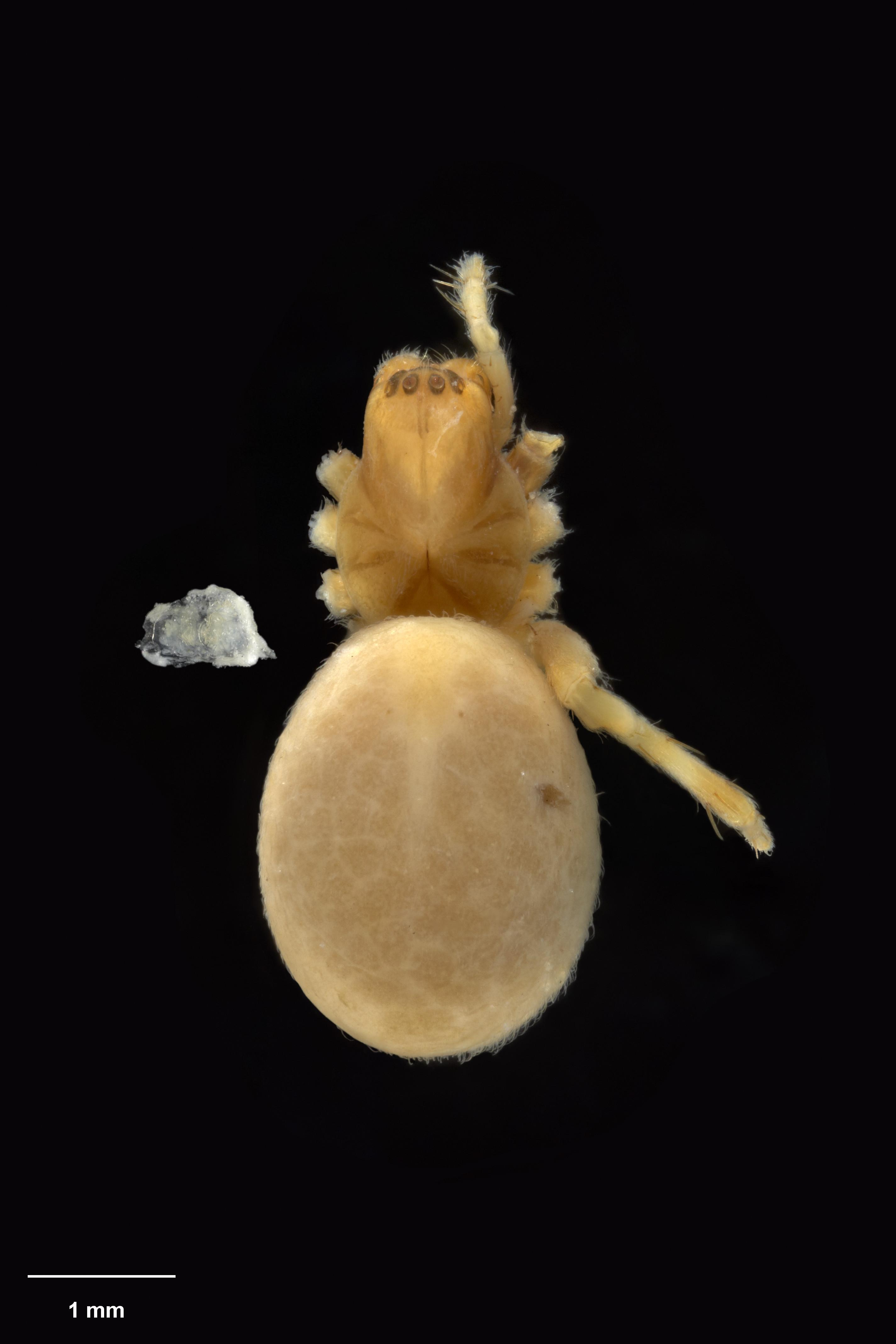

Conservation status
- Not Threatened (NZ TCS)

Scientific classification
- Kingdom: Animalia
- Phylum: Arthropoda
- Subphylum: Chelicerata
- Class: Arachnida
- Order: Araneae
- Infraorder: Araneomorphae
- Family: Desidae
- Genus: Maniho
- Species: M. pumilio

Binomial name
- Maniho pumilio Forster & Wilton, 1973

= Maniho pumilio =

Species of spider

Maniho pumilio is a species of spider in the family Desidae that is endemic to New Zealand.

== Taxonomy ==
This species was described by Ray Forster and Cecil Wilton in 1973 from female and male specimens. The holotype is stored in Te Papa Museum under registration number AS.000091.

== Description ==
The female is recorded at 5mm in length whereas the male is 4.6mm.

== Distribution ==
This species is only known from Wellington, New Zealand.

== Conservation status ==
Under the New Zealand Threat Classification System, this species is listed as "Not Threatened".
