= Tigress (disambiguation) =

A tigress is a female tiger.

Tigress or The Tigress may also refer to:

== Arts and entertainment ==
- The Tigress (1922 film), a German silent film
- The Tigress (1927 film), an American silent film
- The Tigress (1992 film), a German film
- Tigress, a comic book by Heroic Publishing
- Tigress (DC Comics), a number of comic book characters
- Master Tigress, a character in Kung Fu Panda
- Tigress Records, a record label
- Tigress (band), a British Rock band

== Ships ==
- USS Tigress, a number of U.S. Navy ships
- HMS Tigress, a number of Royal Navy ships

== Other uses ==
- Triumph Tigress/BSA Sunbeam, a motor scooter

== See also ==
- Tiger (disambiguation)
- Tigris, a river
- Tygress, the ring name of former WCW Nitro Girl Vanessa Sanchez
