= Piney Creek Wilderness =

Wilderness area in Missouri, United States

- IUCN category Ib (wilderness area)
- Location within the United States
- Location: Barry / Stone counties, Missouri, United States
- Nearest city: Cassville, Missouri
- Coordinates: 36°40′45″N 093°36′46″W
- Area: 8,112 acres (3,283 ha)
- Established: 1980
- Governing body: U.S. Forest Service

The Piney Creek Wilderness is an 8,122-acre (33 km^{2}) wilderness area in Missouri. The United States Congress designated it wilderness in 1980. The Piney Creek Wilderness is located within the Ava-Cassville-Willow Springs Ranger District of the Mark Twain National Forest, east of Cassville, Missouri. The area is named after Piney Creek, which runs the length of the wilderness area and eventually empties into the James River arm of Table Rock Lake. The Piney Creek Wilderness is one of eight wilderness areas of the Mark Twain National Forest that are protected and preserved in Missouri.

The major east-west trail follows Piney Creek for approximately four miles. From Pineview Tower Trailhead on the north, two paths of 1.5 miles each lead south to Piney Creek. Two other maintained foot and horse trails leave the main trail to head south for a grand total of 13.1 Wilderness miles. Portions of the trail system include old roads.

== See also ==
- Bell Mountain Wilderness
- Devils Backbone Wilderness
- Hercules-Glades Wilderness
- Irish Wilderness
- Paddy Creek Wilderness
- Rockpile Mountain Wilderness
