= HMS Tigris =

Five ships of the Royal Navy have borne the name HMS Tigris, after the river Tigris, in modern-day Iraq. Another was planned but never completed:

- HMS Tigris (1813) was a 36-gun fifth rate. She was built as HMS Forth but was renamed in 1812, before being launched in 1813. She was sold for breaking up in 1818.
- HMS Tigris was to have been a 46-gun fifth rate. She was laid down in 1822 but was cancelled in 1832.
- HMS Tigris (1882) was a paddle vessel launched in 1882 and sold into civilian service in 1904, being renamed Amarapoora.
- HMS Tigris (N63) was a T-class submarine launched in 1939 and sunk by an unknown cause in 1943.

== See also ==
- HCS Tigris (1829), a brig of 258 tons (bm) and 10 guns, was built at the Bombay Dockyard for the EIC's naval arm. (One source misnames her as Tigress.) The Indian Navy sold her in 1862.
- PS Tigris (1836), of 109 tons (bm), built by Laird & Co., was a flat-bottomed, iron, paddle steamer of 26HP. She was disassembled, shipped to the Bay of Antioch, carried overland, and reassembled in 1835 on the Lake of Antioch for the English Euphrates expedition, together with PS Euphrates (1836). She was wrecked at Anah on 21 May 1836. (Euphrates completed the descent.)
- Tigris (ship), a number of ships
