= Tigris, Missouri =

Unincorporated community in Missouri, U.S.

- Historic community
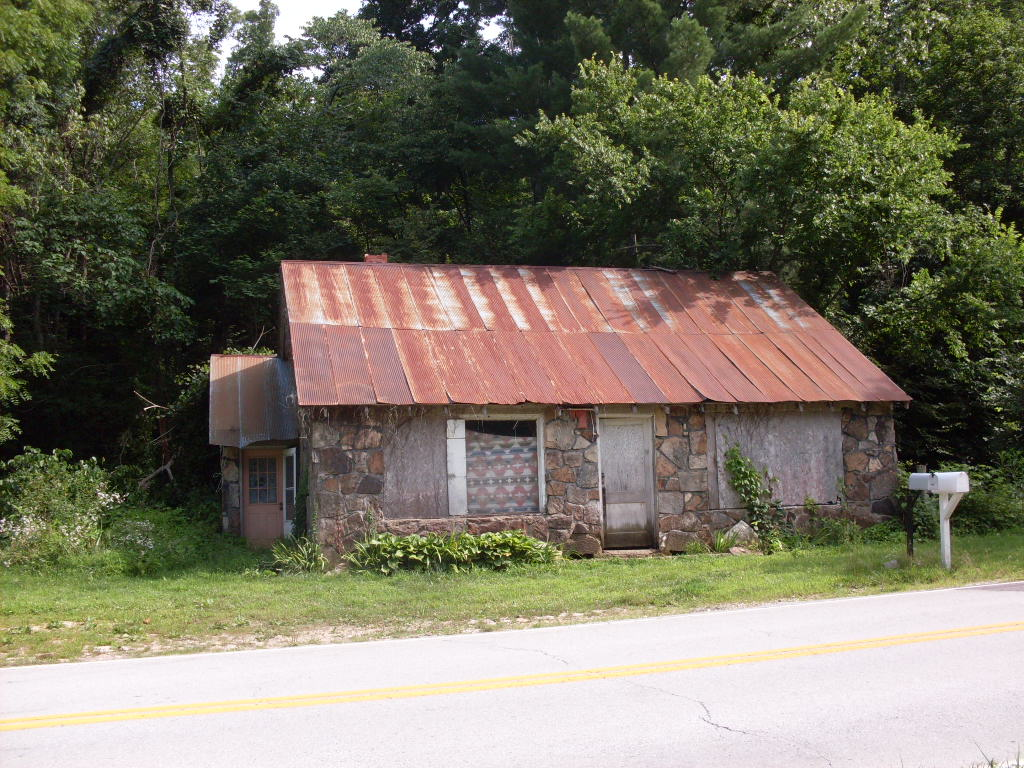
- Old Store building on the south side of Route 14 at Tigris

- Location of Tigris, Missouri Tigris, Missouri (the United States)
- Coordinates: 37°1′22″N 92°46′17″W
- Country: U. S. A.
- State: Missouri
- County: Douglas County
- Elevation: 358 m (1,175 ft)
- Time zone: UTC-6 (CST)
  - Summer (DST): UTC-5 (CDT)

Tigris is an unincorporated community in western Douglas County, in the U.S. state of Missouri. Tigris is located just west of the Beaver Creek bridge on Missouri Route 14.

== History ==
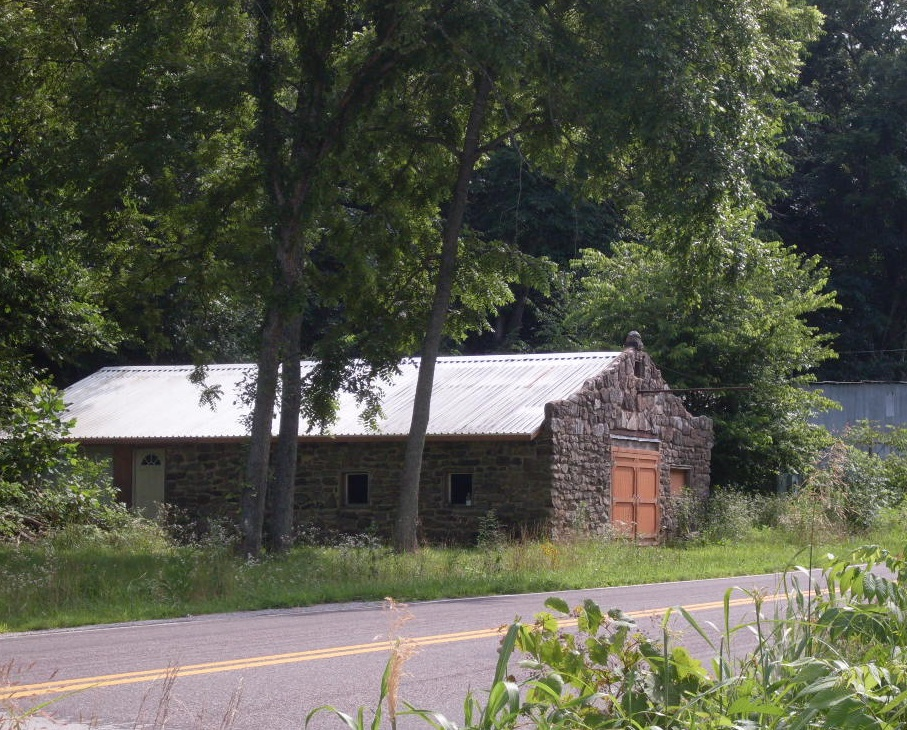
The old tomato canning factory/ garage along Route 14 at Tigris

A post office called Tigris was established in 1909, and remained in operation until 1926. The community was named after the Tigris River, in Asia.
