= Maniho tigris =

Conservation status
- Not Threatened (NZ TCS)

Scientific classification
- Domain: Eukaryota
- Kingdom: Animalia
- Phylum: Arthropoda
- Subphylum: Chelicerata
- Class: Arachnida
- Order: Araneae
- Infraorder: Araneomorphae
- Family: Desidae
- Genus: Maniho
- Species: M. tigris

Binomial name
- Maniho tigris Marples, 1959

Species of spider

Maniho tigris is a species of spider in the family Desidae that is endemic to New Zealand.

== Taxonomy ==
This species was described by Brian John Marples in 1959 from female and male specimens. It was most recently revised in 1973. The holotype is stored in Otago Museum.

== Description ==
The female is recorded at 7.4mm in length whereas the male is 6.25mm. The carapace and abdomen are coloured pale orange brown and have dark markings. The abdomen has a pale pattern dorsally.

== Distribution ==
This species is only known from Nelson, New Zealand.

== Conservation status ==
Under the New Zealand Threat Classification System, this species is listed as "Not Threatened".
