= Paddy Creek Wilderness =

Wilderness area in Missouri, United States

- IUCN category Ib (wilderness area)
- Location within the United States
- Location: Texas County, Missouri, USA
- Nearest city: Licking, Missouri
- Coordinates: 37°31′16″N 92°4′26″W
- Area: 7,019 acres (28 km^{2})
- Established: 1983
- Governing body: U.S. Forest Service

The Paddy Creek Wilderness is a 7,019-acre (28.40 km^{2}) wilderness area in the U.S. state of Missouri, United States. The United States Congress designated it wilderness in 1983. Paddy Creek Wilderness is located within the Houston-Rolla Ranger District, of the Mark Twain National Forest, 10 miles (16 km) northwest of Licking, Missouri. It was named for Big and Little Paddy Creeks that run through the area. The Paddy Creek Wilderness is one of eight wilderness areas protected and preserved in Missouri. Big Piney Trail is a 17-mile (27 km) long loop that traverses this wilderness area and is popular among avid backpackers. The 17-mile (27 km) loop trail can be hiked as a 10-mile (16 km) stretch (north section) or the 7.5-mile (12.1 km) south section. The trails are rugged and can be challenging for the inexperienced or unprepared hiker. Horseback riding is also common on the Piney Creek Trail. The Paddy Creek Recreation Area is nearby, and offers many camping amenities. There are many single sites, and a few double sites available. There is also fishing access on the Big Piney River, via a trail access from the campground.

== See also ==
- Bell Mountain Wilderness
- Devils Backbone Wilderness
- Hercules-Glades Wilderness
- Irish Wilderness
- Piney Creek Wilderness
- Rockpile Mountain Wilderness
