= Irish Wilderness =

Wilderness in Missouri, United States

- IUCN category Ib (wilderness area)
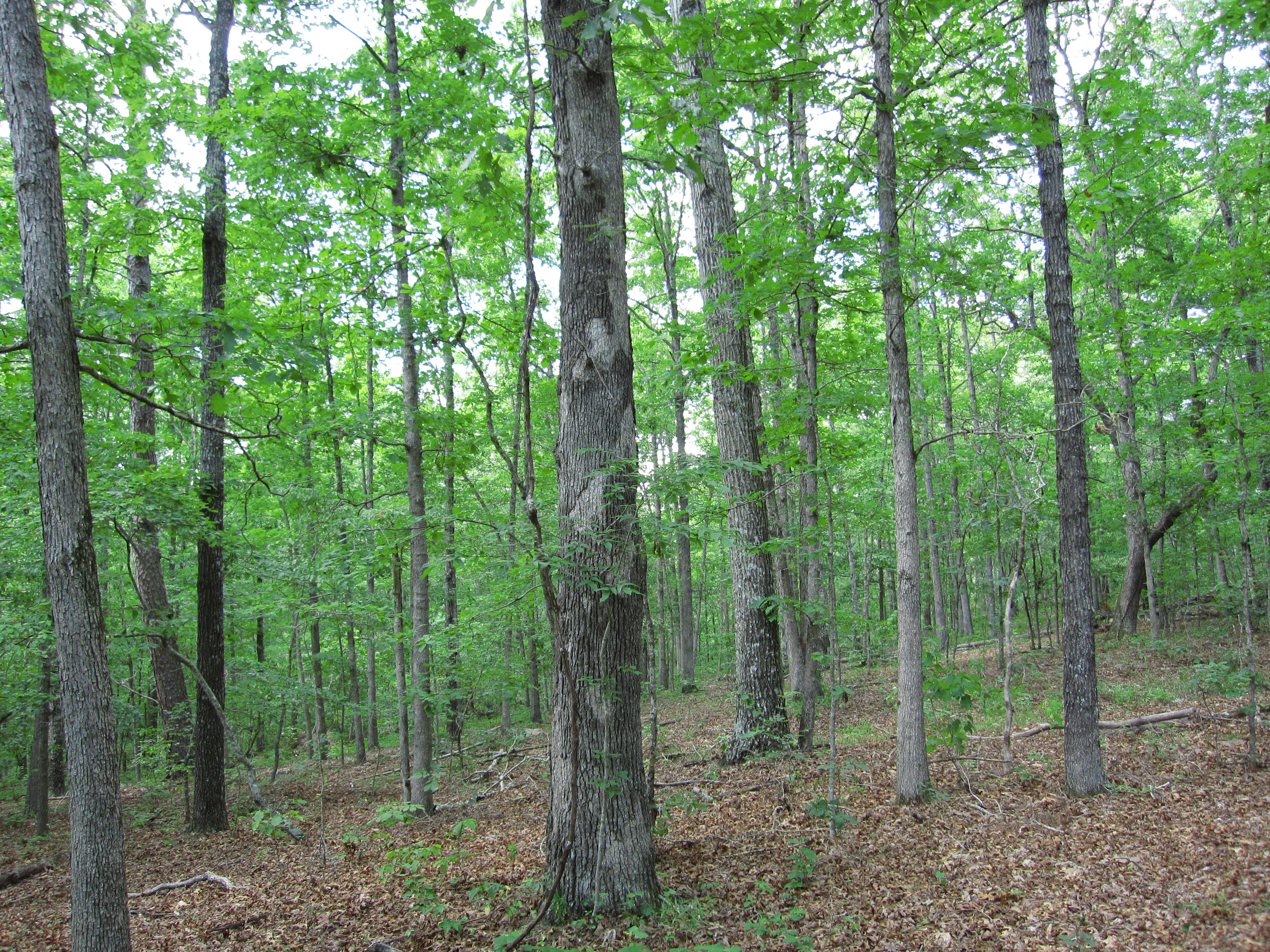
- Irish Wilderness, June 2010

- Location within Missouri Location within the United States
- Location: Oregon County, Missouri, United States
- Nearest city: Fremont, Missouri
- Coordinates: 36°43′51″N 91°10′30″W
- Area: 16,277 acres (65.87 km^{2})
- Established: May 21, 1984
- Governing body: U.S. Forest Service

The Irish Wilderness is a 16,227-acre (66 km^{2}) wilderness area in the U.S. State of Missouri. The U.S. Congress designated it a wilderness in 1984. The Irish Wilderness is located within the Eleven Point Ranger District of the Mark Twain National Forest, 10 miles (16 km) northeast of Alton, Missouri. The Irish Wilderness is one of eight wilderness areas protected and preserved in Missouri.

Hiking and horseback riding are popular on the White's Creek Trail, an 18.6 mile trail throughout the wilderness. Attractions include White's Creek Cave (temporarily gated to protect endangered bats), Fiddler and Bliss Springs, traces of old tramway railroads, and overlooks of the Eleven Point River. The karst topography of the area creates very scenic views along this trail. Wildlife present include black bear, mountain lion, whitetail deer, timber rattlesnakes, turkey, and bald eagles.

== History ==
The Irish Wilderness was historically a settlement of Irish immigrants in Oregon and Ripley Counties founded in 1858 by an Irish Catholic Priest, John Joseph Hogan. The settlement was wiped out during the American Civil War and has remained a wilderness ever since.

=== The Settlers ===
The settlers of the Irish Wilderness came from St. Louis, which had a high influx of Irish immigrants in the 1840s. The Irish immigrants in St. Louis were discriminated against, and were largely employed by the railroad and mining industries. Bishop John Joseph Hogan saw the potential for the immigrants to have their own land, to farm and settle in families. Some land in Oregon and Ripley Counties was bought and donated by a Reverend James Fox. In 1859, there were around forty families who began to settle in the wilderness, and more were on their way. The settlement's western border was the Eleven Point River in Oregon County, from there extending east past the Current River in Ripley County, as far east as Doniphan, Missouri.

=== Destruction of the Settlement ===
The settlement was in existence only from about 1859 through 1863. During the Civil War, the roads that crossed straight through the heart of the settlement, including the Old Bellevue (or Bellview) Road, made the settlers vulnerable to Union and Confederate troops, murderers and criminals. By the end of 1863, the settlement had been destroyed, and all settlers had fled or died. Union Major James Wilson was a factor in the destruction of the settlement. Jerry Ponder (1937-2005) is responsible for much of the research about the Civil War in the area of southern Missouri, especially Ripley County.

== See also ==
- Bell Mountain Wilderness
- Devils Backbone Wilderness
- Hercules-Glades Wilderness
- Paddy Creek Wilderness
- Piney Creek Wilderness
- Rockpile Mountain Wilderness
