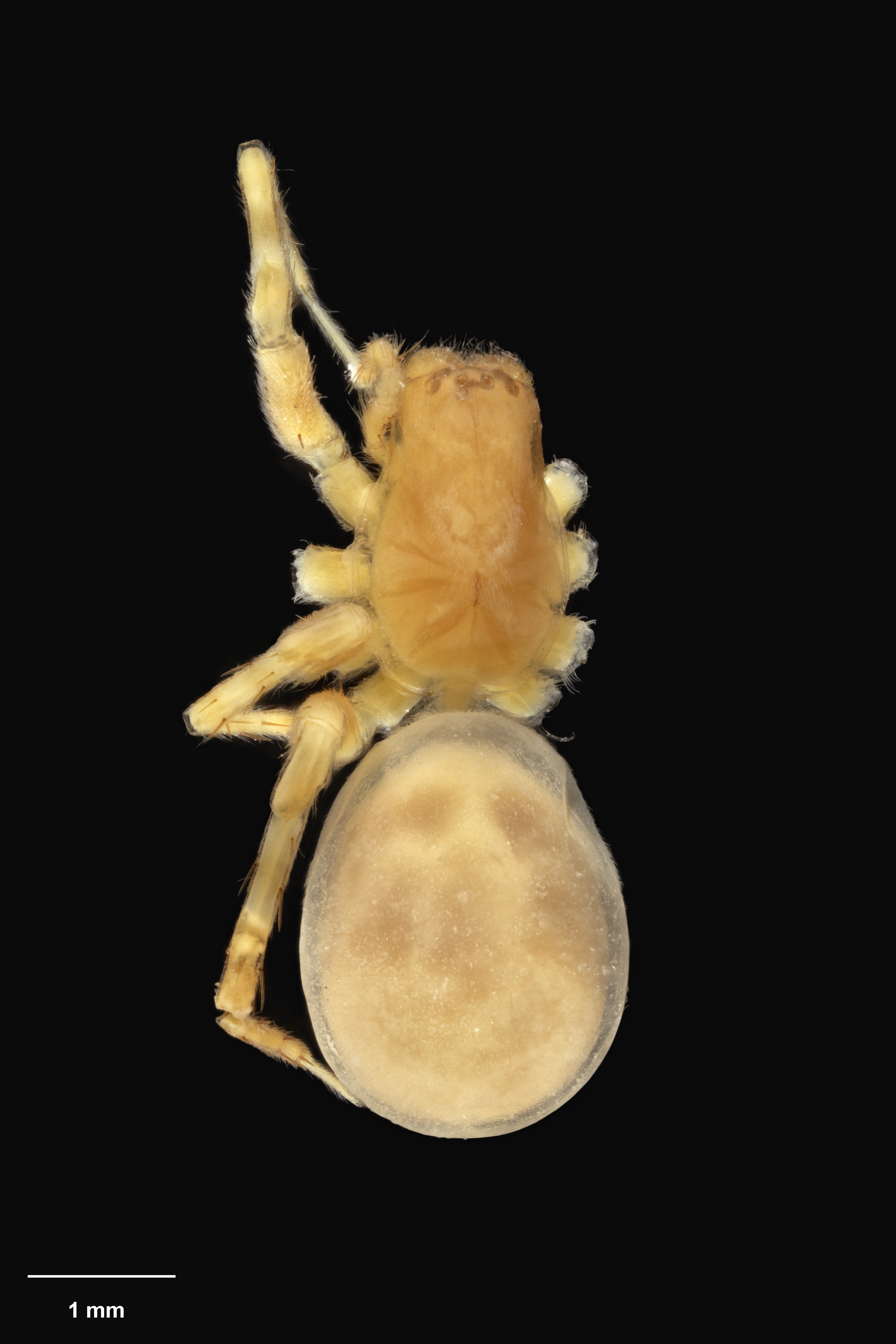
- Maniho australis

Scientific classification
- Kingdom: Animalia
- Phylum: Arthropoda
- Subphylum: Chelicerata
- Class: Arachnida
- Order: Araneae
- Infraorder: Araneomorphae
- Family: Desidae
- Genus: Maniho; Marples, 1959

Type species
- M. tigris Marples, 1959

Species
- 10, see text

= Maniho =

Genus of spiders

Maniho is a genus of intertidal spiders first described by R. R. Marples in 1959.

== Species ==
As of April 2019 it contains ten species, all found in New Zealand:

- Maniho australis Forster & Wilton, 1973 – New Zealand
- Maniho cantuarius Forster & Wilton, 1973 – New Zealand
- Maniho centralis Forster & Wilton, 1973 – New Zealand
- Maniho insulanus Forster & Wilton, 1973 – New Zealand
- Maniho meridionalis Forster & Wilton, 1973 – New Zealand
- Maniho ngaitahu Forster & Wilton, 1973 – New Zealand
- Maniho otagoensis Forster & Wilton, 1973 – New Zealand
- Maniho pumilio Forster & Wilton, 1973 – New Zealand
- Maniho tigris Marples, 1959 – New Zealand
- Maniho vulgaris Forster & Wilton, 1973 – New Zealand
