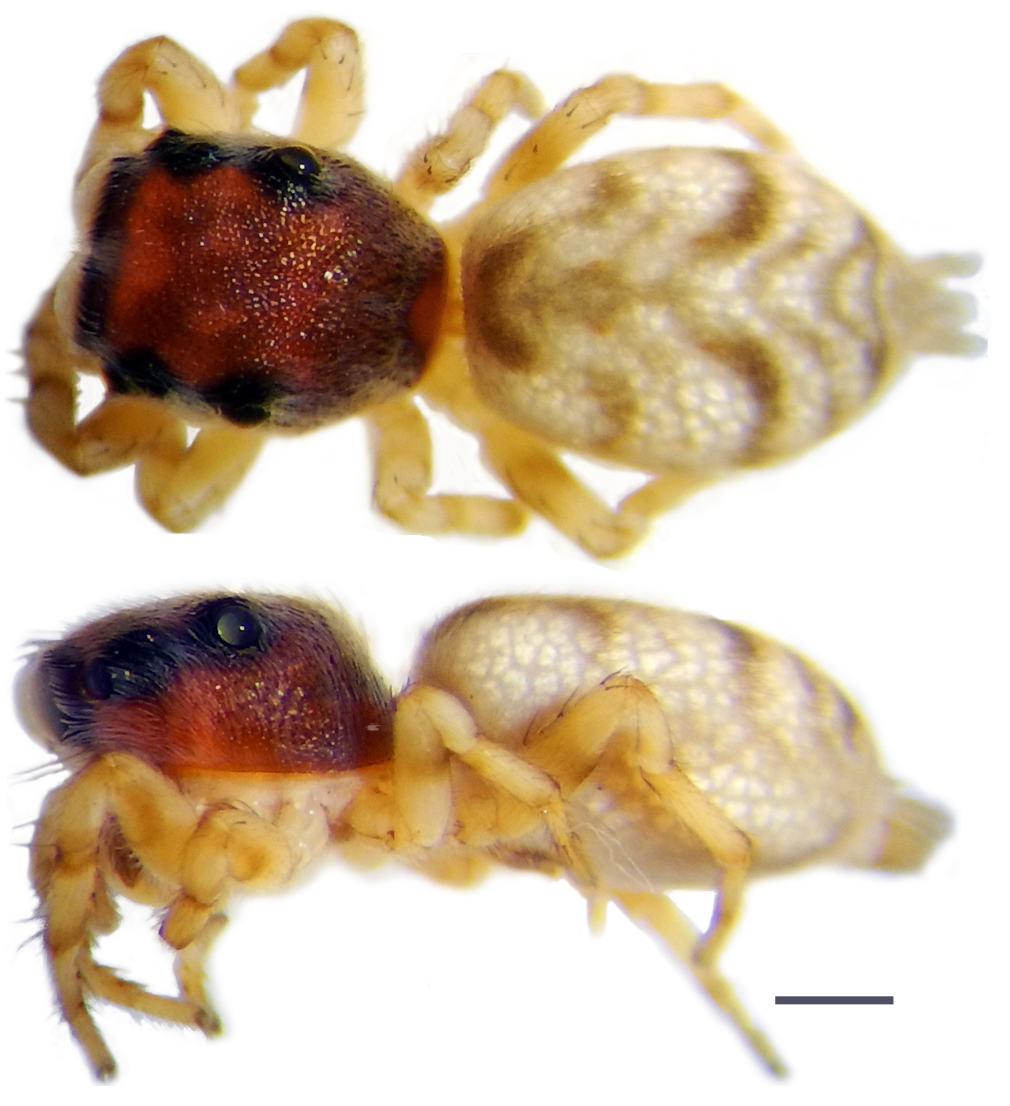
- Scoturius tigris

Scientific classification
- Kingdom: Animalia
- Phylum: Arthropoda
- Subphylum: Chelicerata
- Class: Arachnida
- Order: Araneae
- Infraorder: Araneomorphae
- Family: Salticidae
- Subfamily: Salticinae
- Genus: Scoturius; Simon, 1901

Type species
- S. tigris Simon, 1901

Species
- S. dipterioides Perger & Rubio, 2018 – Bolivia; S. tigris Simon, 1901 – Paraguay, Argentina

= Scoturius =

Genus of spiders

Scoturius is a genus of South American jumping spiders that was first described by Eugène Louis Simon in 1901. As of August 2019 it contains only two species, found only in Argentina, Paraguay, and Bolivia: Scoturius dipterioides and Scoturius tigris.
