= Arno, Missouri =

Unincorporated community in Missouri, U.S.

- Community
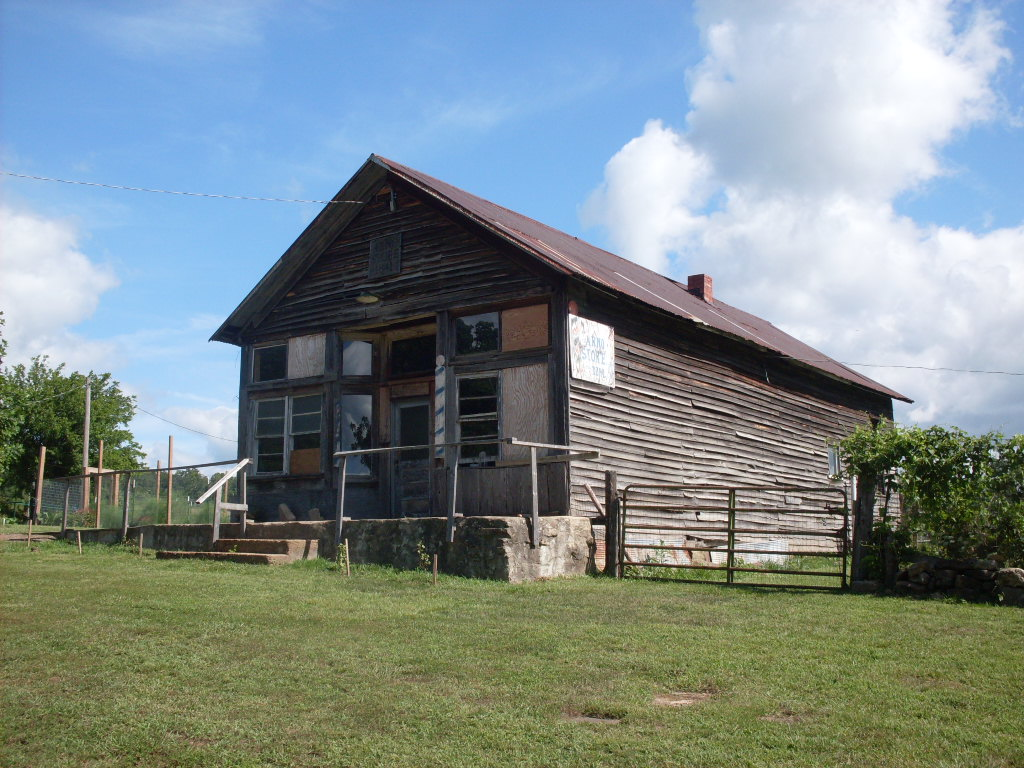
- Old store building at Arno, Missouri

- Location of Arno, Missouri Arno, Missouri (the United States)
- Coordinates: 36°56′24″N 92°44′50″W
- Country: U. S. A.
- State: Missouri
- County: Douglas County
- Elevation: 330 m (1,080 ft)
- Time zone: UTC-6 (CST)
  - Summer (DST): UTC-5 (CDT)
- GNIS feature ID: 713392

Arno is an unincorporated community in western Douglas County, Missouri, United States. Arno is located just east of the confluence of Beaver and Cowskin creeks, approximately five miles west of Ava.

== History ==
Arno was founded in about 1857 in Taney County and the area became part of Douglas County in 1864. Arno was temporarily the county seat of Douglas County in 1869 replacing Vera Cruz. In 1870 Ava became the county seat. Arno post office operated from 1857 to 1863 in Taney County and 1867–1933 in Douglas County.

In 1925, Arno had 31 inhabitants.
