= Tigris (ship) =

Several ships have been named Tigris for the Tigris River:

- Tigris (boat) was a reed boat built and sailed in 1977 by Thor Heyerdahl and a crew to demonstrate the feasibility of ancient migration and trade between Mesopotamia and the Indus Valley Civilization.
- Tigris (1802 ship) was launched at Newcastle-on-Tyne as an East Indiaman. She made six voyages for the British East India Company before she was sold in 1815. She then sailed as a West Indiaman until she was wrecked on 4 December 1823.
- HCS Tigris (1829), a brig of 258 tons (bm) and 10 guns, was built at the Bombay Dockyard for the EIC's naval arm. (One source misnames her as Tigress.) She sailed under Commander William Igglesden and 2nd Lieut. George Borlase Kempthorne from Bombay to Mer Island, arriving in July 1836, in search of survivors from Charles Eaton (1833 ship). The Indian Navy sold her in 1862.
- PS Tigris (1836), of 109 tons (bm), built by Laird & Co., was a flat-bottomed, iron, paddle steamer of 26HP. She was disassembled, shipped to the Bay of Antioch, carried overland, and reassembled in 1835 on the Lake of Antioch for the English Euphrates expedition, together with PS Euphrates (1836). She was wrecked at Anah on 21 May 1836. (Euphrates completed the descent.)

== See also ==
- HMS Tigris, any one of several vessels or shore establishments of the British Royal Navy
