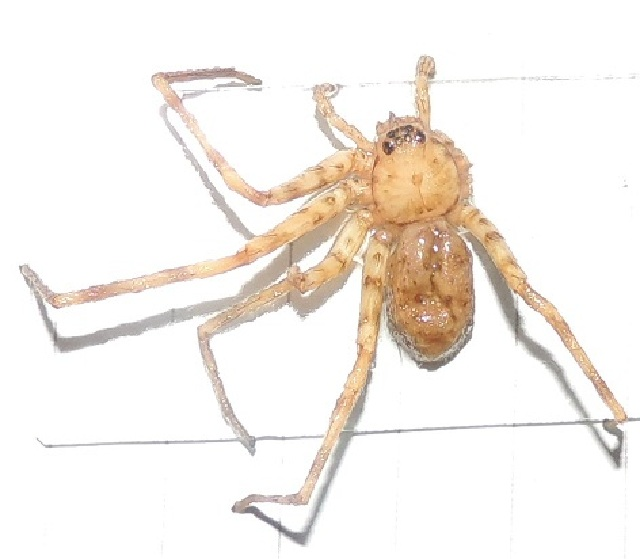
- S. tigris

Scientific classification
- Kingdom: Animalia
- Phylum: Arthropoda
- Subphylum: Chelicerata
- Class: Arachnida
- Order: Araneae
- Infraorder: Araneomorphae
- Family: Sparassidae
- Genus: Spariolenus; Simon, 1880

Type species
- S. tigris Simon, 1880

Species
- 13, see text

= Spariolenus =

Genus of spiders

Spariolenus is a genus of Asian huntsman spiders that was first described by Eugène Louis Simon in 1880. They are found in the Middle East reaching 15–16 cm.

== Etymology ==
The name in greek latin. Spar means "Cave-dweller". iolenus means " the middle east habitat".

== Description ==
Spariolenus are fast-moving cave dwelling predators that prey on cave crickets. The largest species is the Spariolenus iranomaximus which reaches 15 cm.

== Species ==
As of June 2024, the World Spider Catalog accepted the following species, found in Asia:

- Spariolenus aratta Moradmand & Jäger, 2011 – Iran
- Spariolenus bakasura Moradmand, Wesal & Kulkarni, 2023 – India
- Spariolenus baluchistanicus Moradmand, Wesal & Kulkarni, 2023 – Pakistan
- Spariolenus buxa (Saha, Biswas & Raychaudhuri, 1995) – India
- Spariolenus fathpouri Moradmand, 2017 – Iran
- Spariolenus hormozii Moradmand, 2017 – Iran
- Spariolenus iranomaximus Moradmand & Jäger, 2011 – Iran
- Spariolenus khoozestanus Zamani, 2016 – Iran
- Spariolenus lindbergi (Roewer, 1962) – Afghanistan
- Spariolenus manesht Moradmand & Jäger, 2011 – Iran
- Spariolenus mansourii Moradmand, 2017 – Iran
- Spariolenus omidvarbrothers Moradmand, Wesal & Kulkarni, 2023 – Iran
- Spariolenus secundus Jäger, 2006 – Oman
- Spariolenus taeniatus Thorell, 1890 – Indonesia (Sumatra)
- Spariolenus taprobanicus (Walckenaer, 1837) – Sri Lanka
- Spariolenus tigris Simon, 1880 (type) – India
- Spariolenus zagros Moradmand & Jäger, 2011 – Iran
