= Mingo National Wildlife Refuge =

National Wildlife Refuge in Missouri

- IUCN category IV (habitat/species management area)
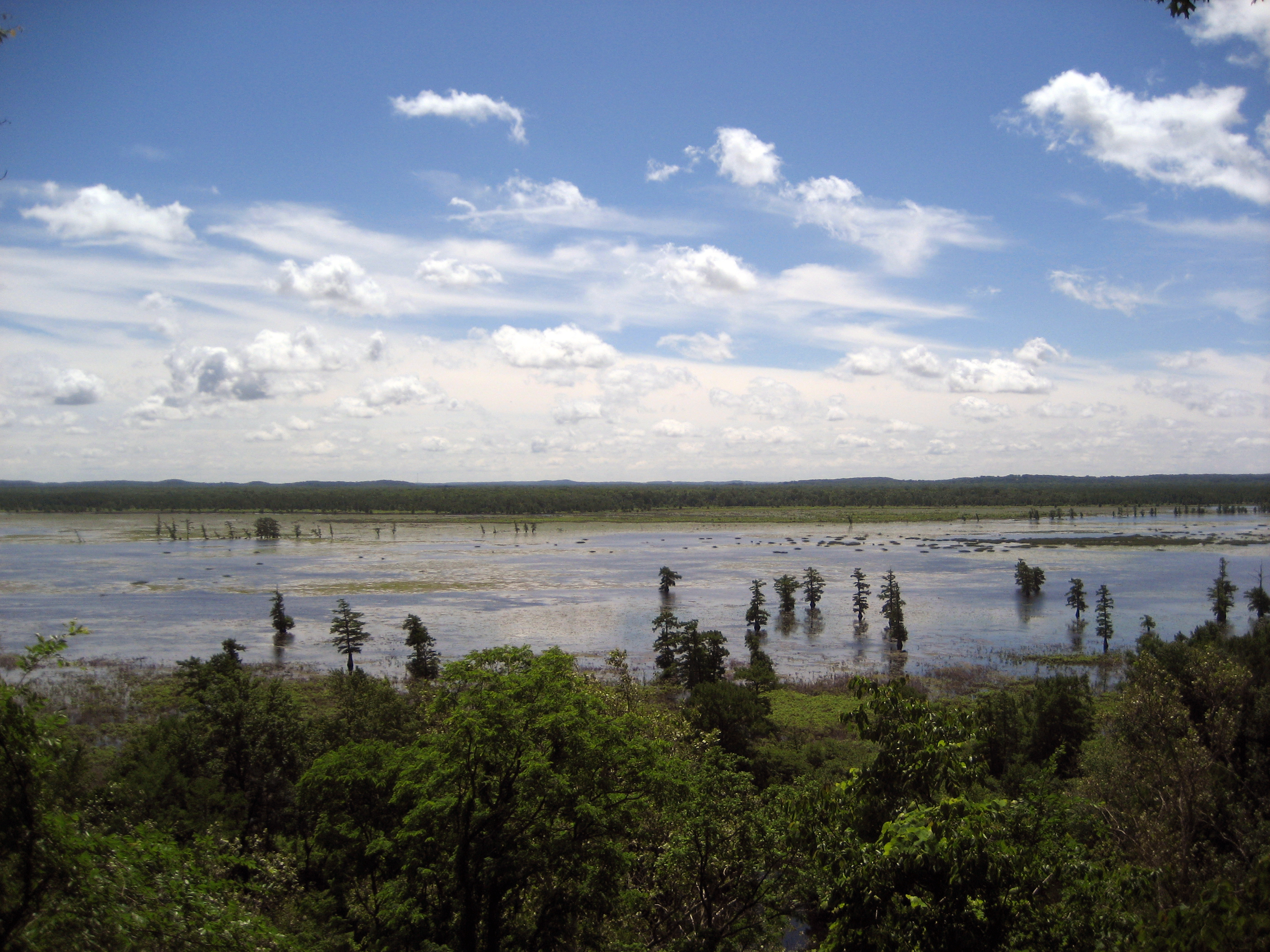
- Mingo National Wildlife Refuge, May 2013

- Location within the United States
- Location: Stoddard / Wayne counties, Missouri, USA
- Nearest city: Puxico, Missouri
- Coordinates: 36°59′36″N 90°10′25″W
- Area: 21,676 acres (8,772 ha)
- Established: 1944
- Visitors: 70,000 (in 2004)
- Governing body: U.S. Fish and Wildlife Service
- Website: Mingo National Wildlife Refuge

The Mingo National Wildlife Refuge is a 21,676-acre (87.7-km^{2}) National Wildlife Refuge located in northwestern Stoddard and southeastern Wayne counties in Missouri. Its southwesternmost portion lies on the shores of Lake Wappapello. Named after the Mingo tribe, it was established to preserve bottomland hardwoods and provide waterfowl and other migratory birds in the Mississippi Flyway with nesting, feeding, brooding, and resting habitat.

The refuge is maintained with a 9-person staff, with a fiscal year 2004 budget of $1.2 million.

== History ==
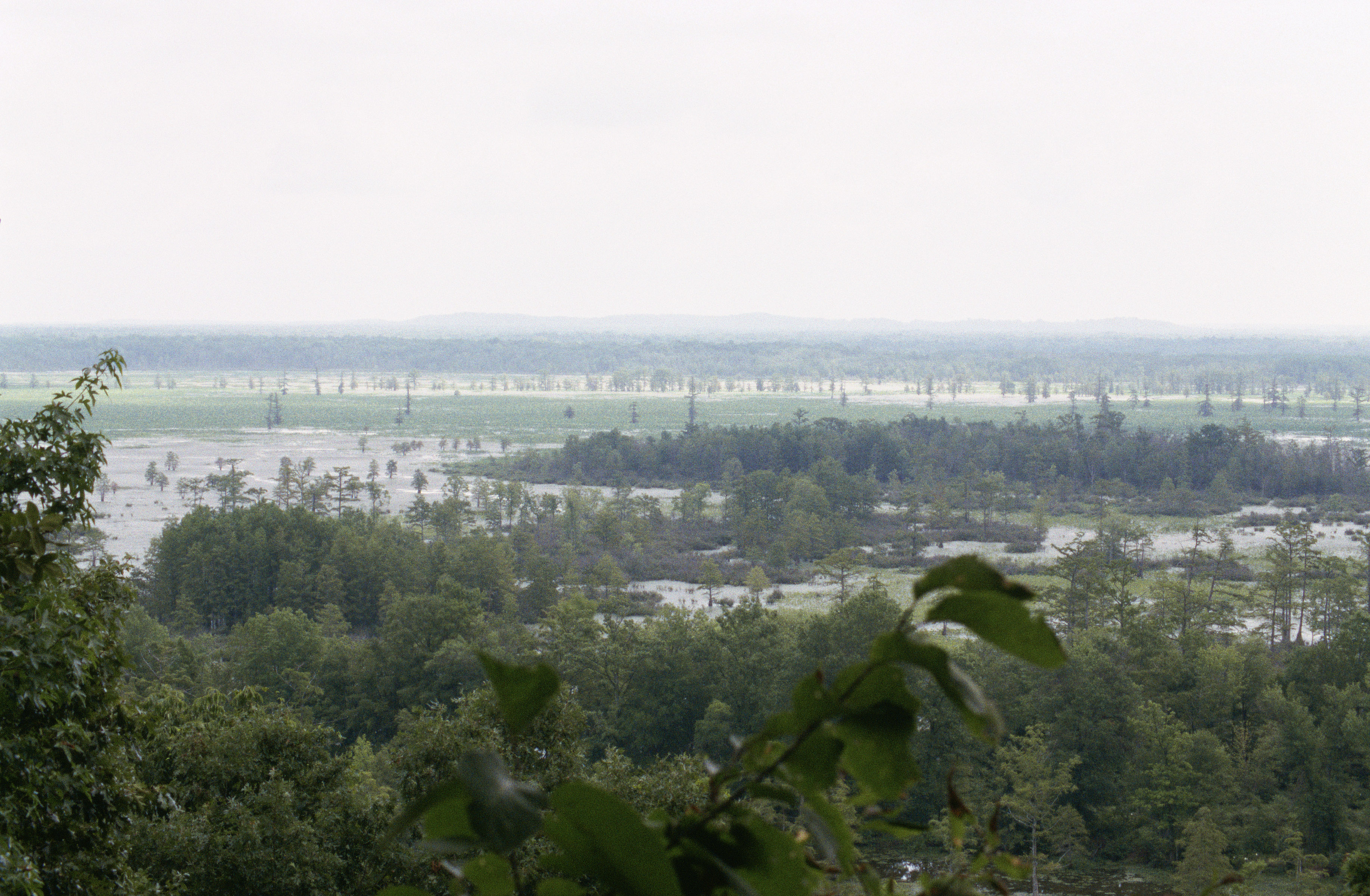
Mingo NWR

In 1804, the United States acquired this territory in the Louisiana Purchase. At that time, the population of the entire Bootheel was sparse, and the swamp area was considered inaccessible. When Missouri became a state in 1821, all of the counties in southeast Missouri had settlers, except Stoddard and Dunklin Counties, although Cape Girardeau was one of the most important river towns in Missouri.

Settlers first came to the swamp because of the vast cypress and tupelo forests. The giant cypress trees were the first to be used for railroad ties and building lumber. The T.J. Moss Tie Company was a large Bootheel lumbering operation, with its headquarters in Puxico, Missouri. By 1888, T.J. Moss was the largest tie contractor in the state, and many of their ties were cut from trees taken from the swamp. A large mill was operated just north of Puxico on land now within Mingo NWR. Local sources claim that, at one time, the mill was the largest bandsaw mill in America. The lumber industry reached peak production in the Bootheel between 1900 and 1910. During its peak, the Bootheel was consistently the leading lumber-producing area of Missouri. However, by 1935, most of the large operations had ceased. The giant trees were cut and it was necessary to find lumber in other places.

The powerful and wealthy lumber companies had not lost interest in the Bootheel yet. If the land could be drained, it would again become an important source of revenue. The size of the projects remained small because of the expanse involved. The lumber companies had considerable capital to invest, but demanded large grants of land for the drainage and were frequently more interested in the land than in efficiency of their drainage ditches. The Missouri State Legislature passed an act that allowed the formation of drainage districts, financed by long-term bonds. For the first time, drainage projects could be adequately financed and many drainage districts were created in the Bootheel.

In 1914, more than 20 drainage districts existed in Stoddard County. One of them was the Mingo Drainage District, a small district in the Advance Lowlands near Puxico. More than $1 million were spent to make Mingo Swamp suitable for farming. A system of seven major north–south ditches was constructed to drain water from the swamp into the St. Francis River, about 10 mi (16 km) south of Puxico. Except for the narrow southern extension of the district south of Puxico, the district's boundary and the Mingo NWR boundary are essentially the same. The ditches constructed by the district are used today by the refuge for water control and management.

During the Great Depression, land values plummeted and many of the large landholders (lumber companies) defaulted on payment of taxes rather than continue to maintain unprofitable investments in the land. Throughout the Bootheel, many drainage districts were unable to meet financial obligations and defaulted on bond payments, largely because they could not absorb the loss of revenue created by the large landholders. Mingo District was one of these.

Drainage attempts at Mingo had not been completely successful, at least in part because of the overflow from the St. Francis River. Also, the soil was not as productive as in other areas of the Bootheel. During the 1930s, Mingo District became insolvent.

The remaining timber was cut by anyone without regard to ownership. The area was open range country. Cattle and hogs ran over the entire swamp. To maintain it in a grassy condition, the land was burned, often several times a year. Hogs and cattle became so numerous, they overflowed into the small towns near the swamp.

Indiscriminate shooting of waterfowl was common. Other wildlife species were also not faring so well. Beaver and deer had disappeared and the wild turkey were nearly extinct from the swamp.

In 1945, the United States Fish and Wildlife Service purchased 21,676 acres (87.7 km^{2}) of the Mingo Swamp and established the Mingo National Wildlife Reserve. The condition of the land was deplorable. In the previous 50 years, people had reduced a beautiful swamp, lush with the growth of plants and alive with animals, into a burnt and eroded wasteland.

Through careful management, most of the natural plants and animals were restored. Native trees have replaced much of the brush and briers, and a canoe trip down the Mingo River will now reveal little to the casual observer of the abuse to this land in years past. Deer, wild turkey, bobcat, and beaver have returned and are plentiful. The refuge is now able to accomplish its primary objective; providing food and shelter for migratory waterfowl. The establishment of the Mingo Wilderness Area in 1976 helps ensure this protection for future generations of Americans.

== Topography ==
About 25,000 years ago, the Mississippi River ran between the Ozark Mountains and a terrace called Crowley's Ridge. Then, around 18,000 years ago, the river shifted, slicing its way through Crowley's Ridge to join the Ohio River further north. The abandoned riverbed developed into a rich and fertile swamp.

The refuge lies in a basin formed in an ancient abandoned channel of the Mississippi, bordered on the west by the foothills of the Ozark Mountains, and on the east by Crowley's Ridge.

The refuge contains the only remaining large tract of bottomland forest of 15,000 acres (61 km^{2}) from the original 2.5 million acres (10,000 km^{2}) native to the bootheel of Missouri. There are seven natural areas and 99 archaeological sites.

About 8000 acres (32 km^{2}) of land are contained in the Mingo Wilderness. Additionally, the 6,190-acre (25-km^{2}) Missouri Department of Conservation, Duck Creek Conservation Area, joins the refuge on the north and east boundary.

== Wildlife and protected species ==
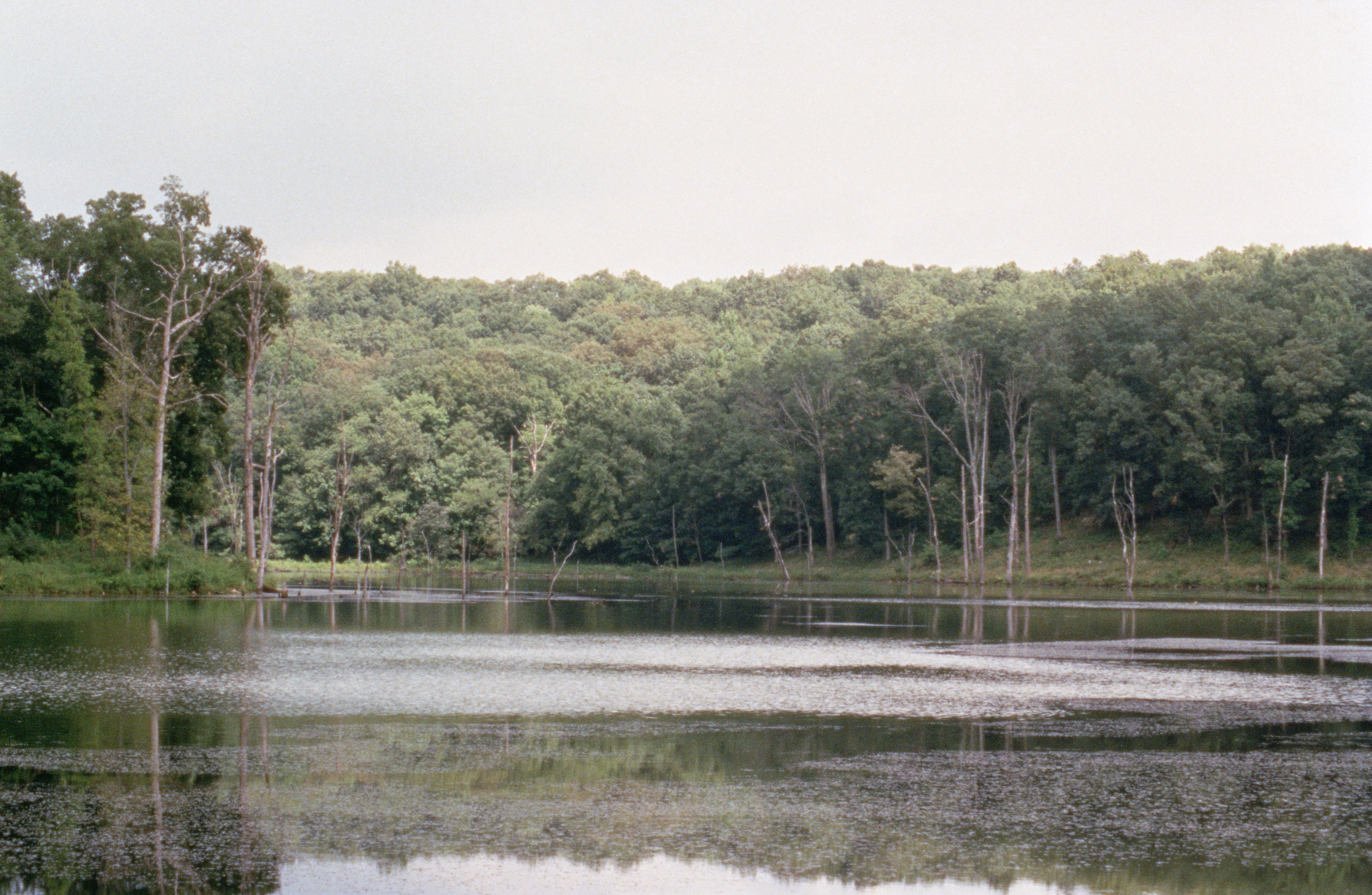
Mingo NWR

Mingo's primary goal is to protect wilderness resources and critical habitat for migratory waterfowl. Located in the center of the busy Mississippi Flyway, the refuge serves as an important resting and feeding area for migratory birds heading south.

In addition to resident waterfowl species, Mingo provides for migrating ducks, geese, shorebirds, gulls, terns, loons, grebes, pelicans, cormorants, herons, bitterns, ibises, rails, coots, and swans. Over 95 species of migratory waterfowl have been seen at Mingo. Through year-round management of the water levels on the refuge, the feeding and resting requirements of migrating birds can be met. The refuge provides wintering habitat for over 150,000 ducks and 75,000 geese.

Mingo also provides for other types of migratory and nonmigratory avian species. Over 250 species of birds have been seen at Mingo. Included in this list are the peregrine falcon, endangered whooping crane, and threatened bald eagle.

Due to the diverse habitat, Mingo is home for a wide variety of lowland swamp species and upland forest and field species. Mingo is home to over 38 species of mammals, 23 species of amphibians, and 37 species of reptiles. Due to wilderness protection and inaccessibility to many areas of the refuge, mammals, amphibians and reptiles are abundant but seldom seen, remaining for the most part unspoiled by man's influence.

== Facilities ==
Wildlife observation and photography are welcomed at the refuge. Twelve miles of refuge roadway are open daily, providing four observation overlooks and one boardwalk nature trail. A 25-mile, scenic, seasonal auto tour route is open throughout April and May to view spring wildflowers and spring songbird migration and October and November for the fall foliage and waterfowl migration.

Limited hunting for deer, wild turkey, squirrel, and waterfowl is available in designated areas of the refuge. Fishing for bass, crappie, bluegill, and catfish is a popular activity on the refuge.

=== Trails ===
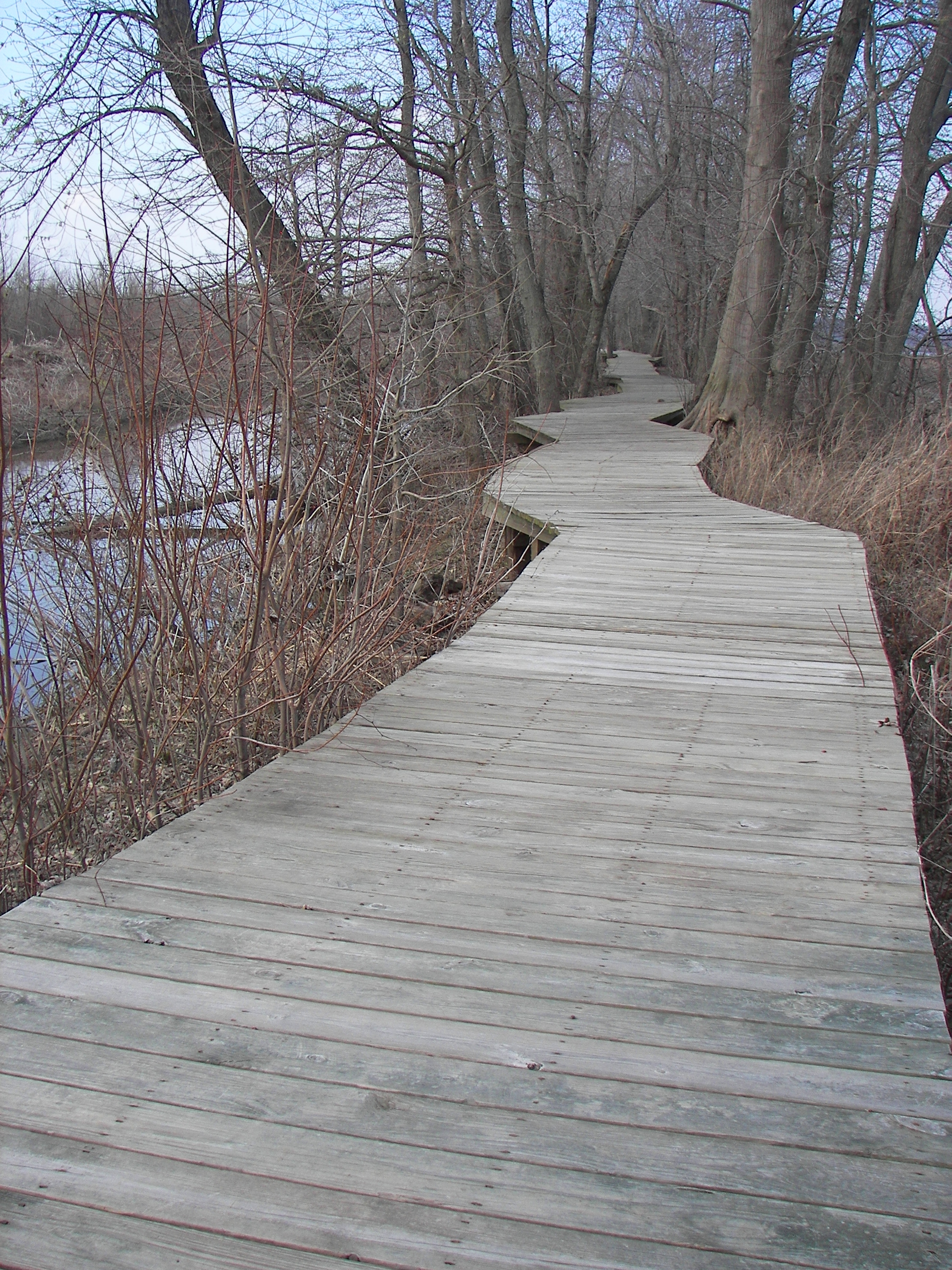
A section of boardwalk trail leads to an observation platform.

The refuge has three designated trails along with 50 mi (80 km) of unmarked trails:

==== Boardwalk Nature Trail ====
The Boardwalk Nature Trail allows visitors to enjoy the Mingo Swamp without getting wet. Down this path lies a one-mile (1.6-km) loop trail through the bottomland hardwood swamp. A self-guided pamphlet of the trail is available at the Boardwalk parking lot. The path is wheelchair accessible.

==== Bluff Trail ====
The quarter-mile Bluff Trail begins at the Visitor Center and connects with the Boardwalk. It provides a fascinating hike when wildflowers are blooming in the spring. It also furnishes an interesting view of the steep limestone bluffs bordering the swamp that once was the Mississippi River. This trail is rated "challenging" for hikers.

==== Hartz Pond Trail ====
The Hartz Pond Trail begins in the Visitor Center parking lot and leads to Hartz Pond, a small pond with a picnic table and fishing opportunities for children. Hartz Pond is also used an outdoor classroom for environmental education classes.

==== Other hiking areas ====
In addition to the trails listed above, Mingo has over 50 mi (80 km) of hiking opportunities on other refuge roads, dikes, and levees that are not open to vehicular traffic, but are open to foot traffic from March 15 through September 30. Visitors should contact the Visitor Center before venturing out for directions and special regulations that may apply.

== See also ==
- List of National Wildlife Refuges
