= Devils Backbone Wilderness =

Wilderness area in Missouri, United States

Devil's Backbone Wilderness
- IUCN category Ib (wilderness area)
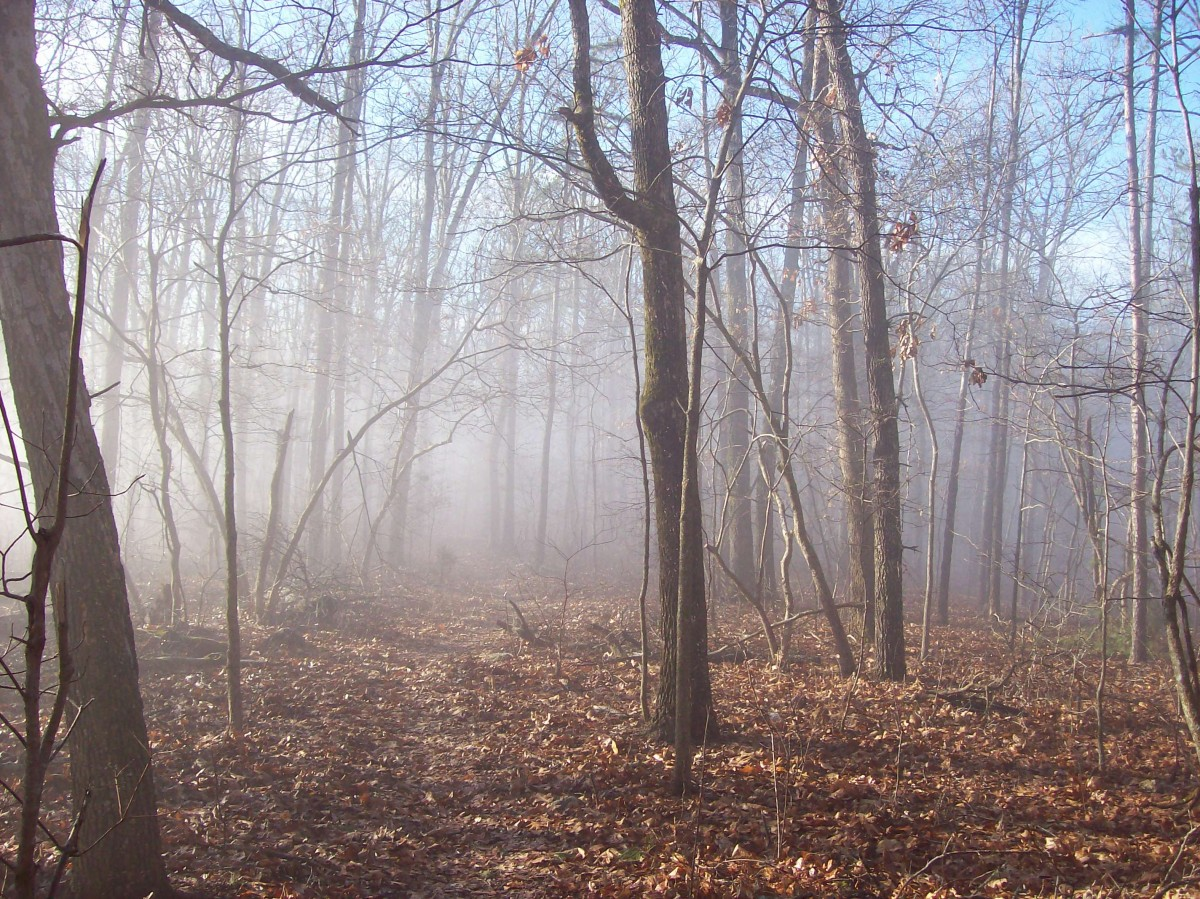

- Location within the United States
- Location: Ozark County, Missouri, USA
- Nearest city: Willow Springs, Missouri
- Coordinates: 36°44′3″N 92°8′42″W
- Area: 6,687 acres (2,706 ha)
- Established: 1980
- Governing body: U.S. Forest Service

Devils Backbone Wilderness is a protected area in Missouri that is maintained by the United States Forest Service and was designated as such by the United States Congress in 1980. The wilderness area now has a total of 6,687 acres (2,706 ha). Devils Backbone is located within the Willow Springs portion of the Ava-Cassville-Willow Springs Ranger District, of the Mark Twain National Forest, near Willow Springs. It was named for a prominent ridge down the center of the area. Devils Backbone Wilderness is one of eight wilderness areas protected and preserved in Missouri.

== Geography ==
The Devils Backbone Wilderness area is located in northeastern Ozark County about 15 mi (24 km) north of the Arkansas-Missouri border. It has a flatter topography than most of the Ozarks with a maximum elevation of 1,020 ft (310 m). The nearest city is West Plains which is 15 mi (24 km) east.

== Ecology ==
=== Flora ===
Devils Backbone offers a variety of recreational activities for visitors. In the spring season, dogwood, redbud, and serviceberry trees are flowering in full force. Then, in fall the foliage of the oaks, sassafras, and red maples begin to turn a vast array of reds, yellows, and oranges.

=== Fauna ===
For those interested in wildlife, White-tailed deer (Odocoileus virginiana), red and grey fox (Vulpes vulpes and Urycyon cinereoargenteus), bobcats (Lynx rufus), skunks (Mephitis mephitis), squirrels (Sciurus niger and S. carolinensis), coyotes (Canis latrans), and raccoons (Procyon lotor) can be seen roaming the limestone glades. Visitors, especially hikers should be aware of potentially threatening (but easily avoided) copperhead snakes (Agkistrodon contortrix) and Eastern timber rattlesnakes (Crotalus horridus) are likewise commonly seen.

== Recreation ==
The North Fork River is also main attraction for visitors to the area. There are three springs within Devils Backbone that feed the North Fork (Blue, Amber, and McGarr). There is even a canoe launch for the river which offers smallmouth bass, blue gill, and rock bass angling opportunities. Horseback riding is popular on a network of trails in the wilderness.

== See also ==
- Bell Mountain Wilderness
- Hercules-Glades Wilderness
- Irish Wilderness
- Paddy Creek Wilderness
- Piney Creek Wilderness
- List of U.S. Wilderness Areas
