= Mark Twain National Forest =

United States historic center

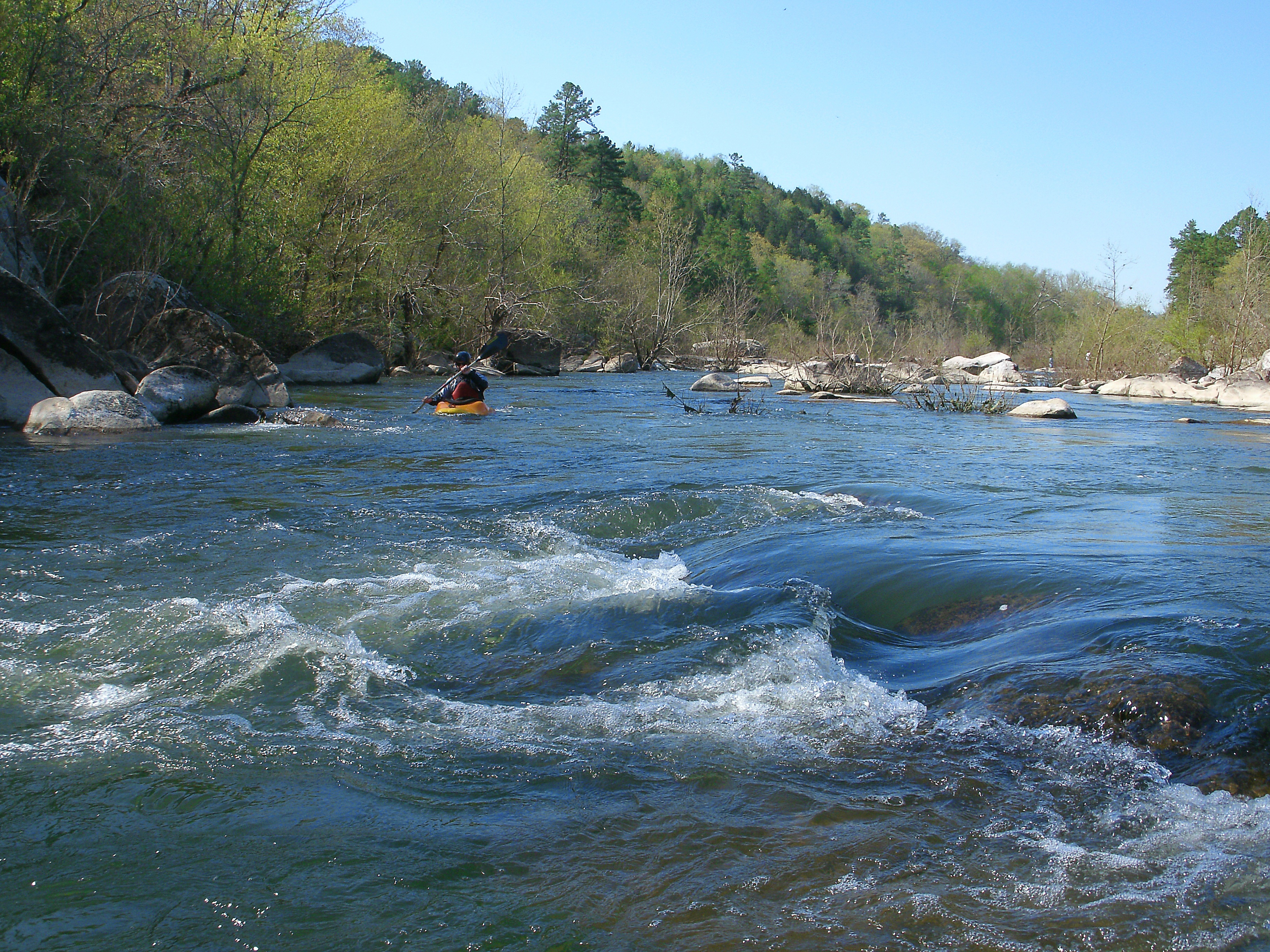
- A kayaker on the St. Francis River at Silver Mines Recreation Area in the Mark Twain National Forest

- Location within the United States
- Location: Missouri, United States
- Nearest city: Rolla, Missouri
- Coordinates: 37°38′13″N 91°05′24″W
- Area: 1,491,840 acres (6,037.3 km^{2})
- Established: September 23, 1939; 87 years ago
- Named for: Mark Twain
- Governing body: U.S. Forest Service
- Website: Mark Twain National Forest

Mark Twain National Forest (MTNF) is a U.S. National Forest located in the southern half of Missouri, composed of nine disconnected parcels. MTNF was established on September 11, 1939. It is named for author Mark Twain, a Missouri native. The MTNF covers 3,068,800 acres (4,795 sq mi) of which 1,506,100 acres (2,353.3 sq mi) is public owned, 78,000 acres (122 sq mi) of which are Wilderness, and National Scenic River area. MTNF spans 29 counties and represents 11% of all forested land in Missouri. MTNF's nine tracts are divided into six distinct ranger districts: Ava-Cassville-Willow Springs, Eleven Point, Houston-Rolla, Cedar Creek, Poplar Bluff, Potosi-Fredericktown, and the Salem. Its headquarters are in Rolla, Missouri.

Some unique features of the Mark Twain include Greer Spring, which is the largest spring on National Forest land and part of the Eleven Point National Scenic River with an average daily flow of 214 million U.S. gallons (810 million liters). The public can also visit the Glade Top Trail National Scenic Byway, which offers views of over 30 miles (48 km) to the Boston Mountains in Arkansas. The 350-mile (560 km) Ozark Trail system winds through much of the National Forest.

The Forest has two trail systems for certain motorized vehicles and bikes, being the Chadwick Motorcycle & ATV Use Area and the Sutton Bluff ATV, UTV, and Motorcycle Trail System.

== History ==
The Mark Twain National Forest, as we know it today, was created on February 17, 1976. The Mark Twain National forest has a rather unusual history – for it was once known as both the Clark National Forest and the Mark Twain National Forest – both being proclaimed on September 11, 1939.

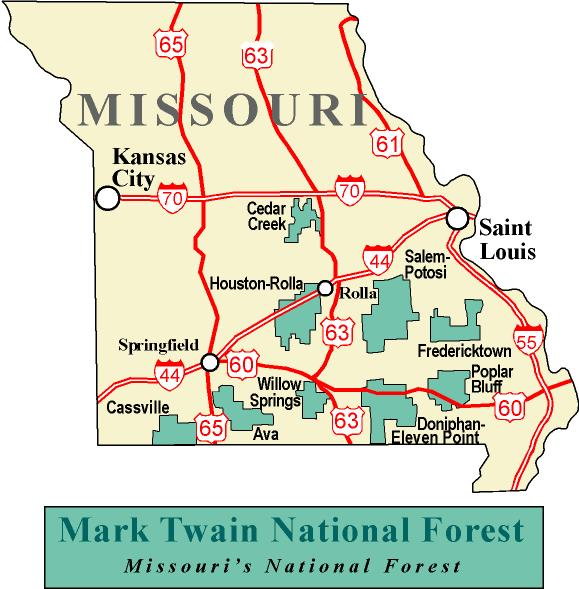
Map of the National Forest

In June 1973, the Clark and Mark Twain NF were brought under one headquarters in Rolla and became known as the National forests in Missouri. On February 17, 1976, the forests were combined and renamed the Mark Twain National Forest.

Missouri’s only national forest, The Mark Twain, encompasses roughly 1.5 million acres (2,300 sq mi), mostly within the Ozarks. Located across southern Missouri and northern Arkansas, the Ozark Highlands are an ancient landscape characterized by large permanent springs, over 5,000 caves, rocky barren glades, old volcanic mountains and nationally recognized streams. Portions of the Ozarks were never under oceans, nor were the areas glaciated. Much of the Arkansas Ozarks are preserved in the Ozark National Forest.

In the 1870s, citizens of southern Missouri began an era of extensive logging of the state's native oak, hickory, and pine forests. Lumber mills were commonplace, but by the 1920s they had disappeared, along with much of the state's native forests. Thus, in 1939, President Franklin D. Roosevelt signed the MTNF into existence. In March 1933, he also created the Emergency Conservation Work Act, better known as the Civilian Conservation Corps (CCC). In the area that would later become the Mark Twain National Forest, hundreds of young men at over 50 CCC sites worked at building roads and planting hundreds of acres of pine to preserve and enhance the natural resources of southern Missouri. Many of their contributions can still be visited and enjoyed today including the Rolla Ranger Station Historic District and Winona Ranger Station Historic District.

== Wilderness areas ==
- Bell Mountain Wilderness
- Devils Backbone Wilderness
- Hercules-Glades Wilderness
- Irish Wilderness
- Paddy Creek Wilderness
- Piney Creek Wilderness
- Rockpile Mountain Wilderness

== Counties ==
County	Area	
County	Acres	Hectares
Oregon County	104,721	42,379
Ripley County	97,437	39,431
Iron County	96,047	38,869
Carter County	90,641	36,681
Reynolds County	89,933	36,395
Wayne County	88,372	35,763
Shannon County	83,934	33,967
Washington County	82,133	33,238
Dent County	73,011	29,547
Taney County	65,953	26,690
Phelps County	65,379	26,458
Barry County	55,187	22,333
Christian County	52,260	21,149
Madison County	51,170	20,708
Howell County	50,504	20,438
Crawford County	50,048	20,254
Texas County	49,581	20,065
Butler County	48,494	19,625
Douglas County	41,030	16,604
Pulaski County	39,177	15,854
Ozark County	38,672	15,650
Laclede County	30,542	12,360
Callaway County	12,467	5,045
Stone County	10,335	4,182
Sainte Genevieve County	10,254	4,150
Wright County	7,159	2,897
Boone County	4,102	1,660
Bollinger County	1,646	666
Saint Francois County	673	272

Although it is far from being the largest National Forest in acreage, Mark Twain National Forest is located in more counties than any other. As of September 30, 2007, its 1,490,862 acres (2,329.472 sq mi; 6,033.30 km^{2}) were spread over parts of 29 counties in southern and central Missouri.

== Climate ==
Climate data for Mark Twain National Forest
Month	Jan	Feb	Mar	Apr	May	Jun	Jul	Aug	Sep	Oct	Nov	Dec	Year
Record high °F (°C)	75 (24)	80 (27)	88 (31)	90 (32)	94 (34)	100 (38)	107 (42)	104 (40)	99 (37)	94 (34)	83 (28)	75 (24)	107 (42)
Mean daily maximum °F (°C)	42 (6)	48 (9)	58 (14)	68 (20)	75 (24)	83 (28)	88 (31)	87 (31)	80 (27)	69 (21)	57 (14)	44 (7)	67 (19)
Mean daily minimum °F (°C)	21 (−6)	25 (−4)	33 (1)	42 (6)	52 (11)	61 (16)	65 (18)	64 (18)	55 (13)	44 (7)	34 (1)	25 (−4)	43 (6)
Record low °F (°C)	−19 (−28)	−11 (−24)	−2 (−19)	18 (−8)	28 (−2)	40 (4)	44 (7)	39 (4)	30 (−1)	19 (−7)	4 (−16)	−10 (−23)	−19 (−28)
Average precipitation inches (mm)	2.1 (53)	2.29 (58)	4.18 (106)	4.28 (109)	4.95 (126)	4.22 (107)	3.70 (94)	3.40 (86)	3.91 (99)	3.44 (87)	3.91 (99)	3.30 (84)	43.68 (1,108)
Average snowfall inches (cm)	6.7 (17)	4.6 (12)	2.1 (5.3)	0.3 (0.76)	0 (0)	0 (0)	0 (0)	0 (0)	0 (0)	0.3 (0.76)	0.9 (2.3)	7.1 (18)	22 (56.12)

== See also ==
- List of national forests of the United States

== Sources ==
- "Mark Twain National Forest". United States Forest Service.
