= Hercules Glades Wilderness =

Wilderness area in Missouri

- IUCN category Ib (wilderness area)
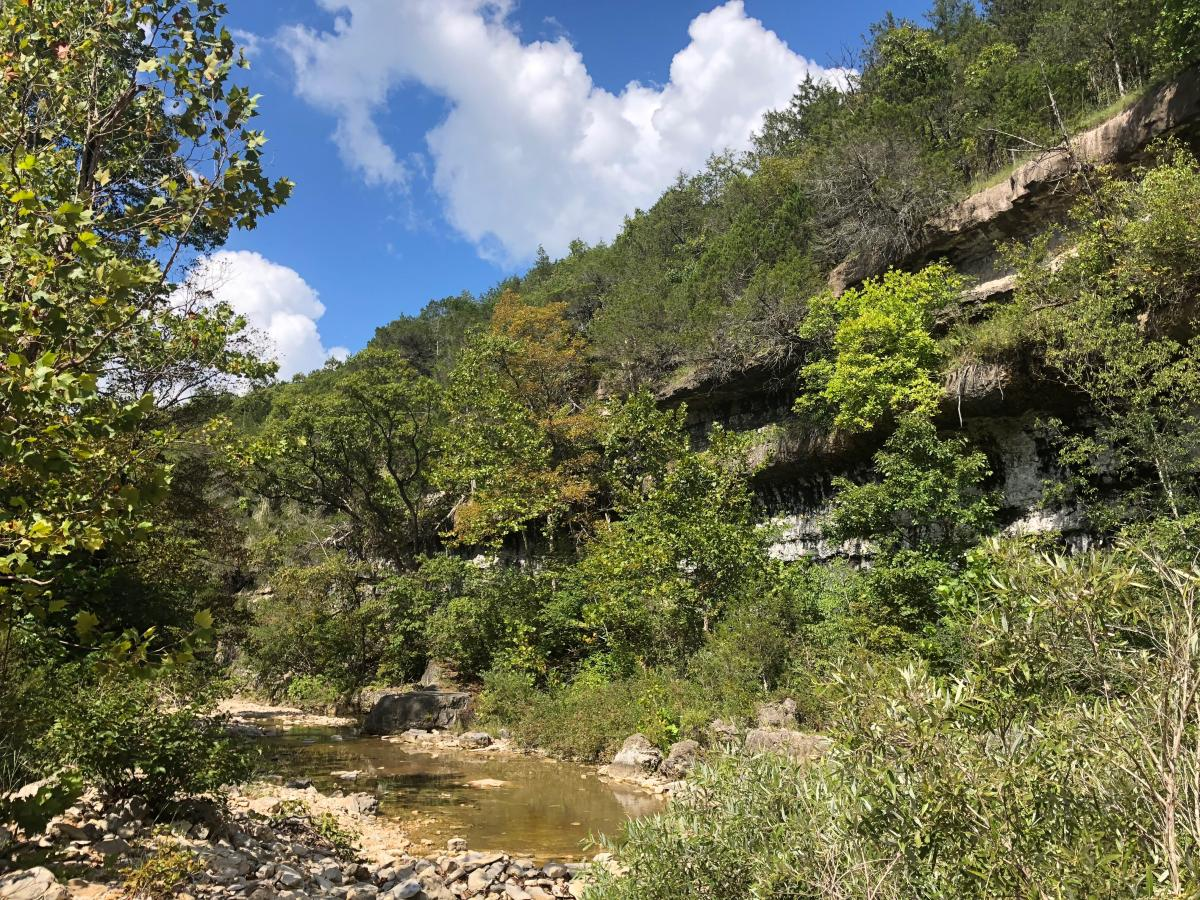

- Location within the United States
- Location: Taney County, Missouri, USA
- Nearest city: Forsyth, Missouri or Taneyville, Missouri
- Coordinates: 36°40′N 92°56′W
- Area: 12,314 acres (50 km^{2})
- Established: 1976
- Governing body: U.S. Forest Service

The Hercules Glades Wilderness is a 12,314-acre (50 km^{2}) wilderness area in Taney County in the Ozarks of southwest Missouri. The United States Congress designated it a wilderness in 1976, making it the oldest wilderness area in Missouri. It is one of eight wilderness areas in the Mark Twain National Forest and is within the Ava-Cassville-Willow Springs ranger district, about 10 miles (16 km) northeast of Branson, Missouri. Hercules Glades Wilderness derives its name from the open limestone glades (balds) that dot its landscape. The high points of Coy Bald and Pilot Knob stand 600 feet above Long Creek and offer splendid views of the drainage. Near the middle of the wilderness area is the main set of waterfalls, though Long Creek has several other smaller waterfalls and cascades along its path.

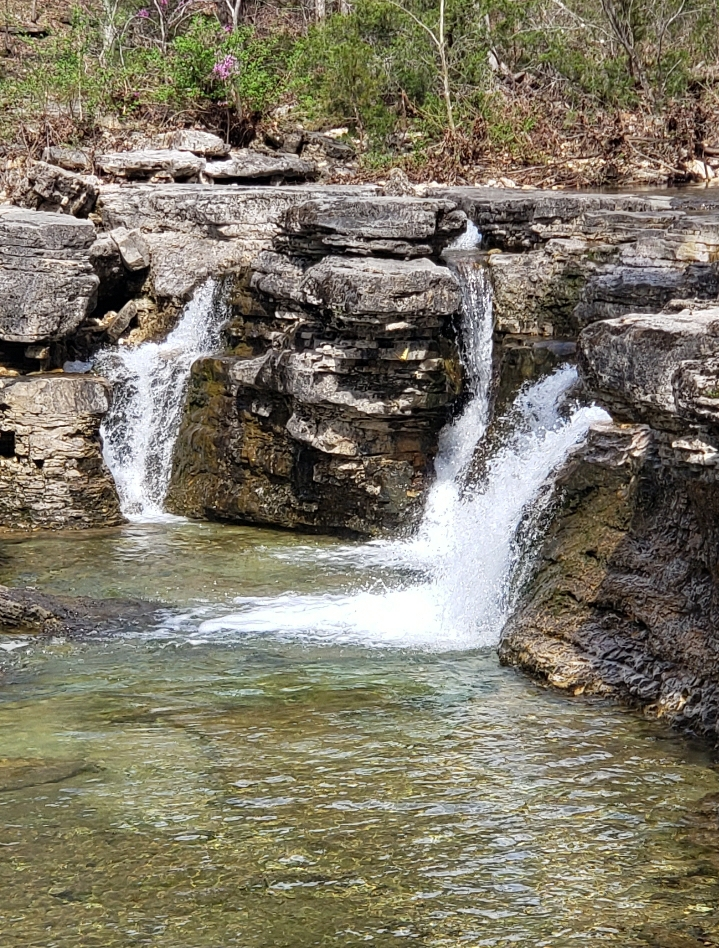
The "Falls" at Hercules Glades Wilderness

== Flora and fauna ==
The flora is a mix of typical oak and hickory forests interspersed with open post oak savannahs and rocky, desert-like glades; it is home to many species of plants and wildlife. This includes some that are often considered to be southwestern species. prickly pear cacti, roadrunner, scorpions, collared lizard, pygmy rattlesnakes, and even tarantulas call Hercules Glades Wilderness home, not to mention other wildlife more common in Missouri like the white-tailed deer and wild turkey. Hercules Glades Wilderness is also home to many species of plants that are Ozark endemics. Some of these plants are Bush's skullcap (Scutellaria bushii), Ozark corn salad (Valerianella ozarkana), purple penstemon (Penstemon cobaea var. purpureus), and Trelease's larkspur (Delphinium treleasei). Depending on past land-use histories (fire, grazing, and logging primarily) some places within Hercules Glades Wilderness exhibit floral diversities that rival other areas in Missouri.

== Trails ==
Hercules Glades has 32 miles (51 km) of trails that are popular for foot travel and horseback riding, and there are camping facilities available, with three main trailheads: the Coy Bald trailhead on the west edge, the Blair Ridge trailhead on the south edge, and the Tower trailhead on the east edge. The trails lack bridges when crossing the various shallow creeks within the wilderness area. The trailheads of the wilderness area are accessed from county roads branching off of U.S. Route 160 and Route 125.

== See also ==
- Bell Mountain Wilderness
- Devils Backbone Wilderness
- Irish Wilderness
- Paddy Creek Wilderness
- Piney Creek Wilderness
- Rockpile Mountain Wilderness
