= List of rivers of the United States Virgin Islands =

This is a list of rivers and streams of the United States Virgin Islands (U.S. territory), grouped by island.

== Saint Croix ==
- Salt River

== Saint John ==
From east to west, all flowing to the south coast:

- Carolina Gut
- Cob Gut
- Lameshur Bay Gut
- Reef Bay Gut
  - Living Gut (Rustenberg Gut)
- Mollendal Gut
- Fish Bay Gut
  - Battery Gut
- Guinea Gut

== Saint Thomas ==
- Turpentine Run
