= Clever Creek =

Stream in the American state of Missouri

Location
- Country: United States
- State: Missouri
- Region: Douglas County

Physical characteristics
- Source
  - coordinates: 37°01′35″N 92°24′03″W
  - elevation: 1,320 ft (400 m)
- Mouth
  - coordinates: 36°56′17″N 92°23′16″W
  - elevation: 886 ft (270 m)

Clever Creek is a stream in north central Douglas County the Ozarks of southern Missouri. It is a tributary to Fox Creek. From its source southeast of Tick Ridge, Clever Creek flows southwest to south and passes under Missouri Route 76 at Coldspring. From there the stream flows south to southeast to its confluence with Fox Creek just northeast of Champion.

Clever Creek takes its name from the city of Clever in Christian County.

== See also ==
- List of rivers of Missouri
