= Tedrick, Missouri =

Extinct hamlet in Missouri, U.S.

Coordinates: 36°54′38″N 92°22′25″W

Tedrick is an historic town in Douglas County, Missouri, United States. The location is on a ridge east of Fox Creek and approximately one mile south-southeast of Champion.

A post office called Tedrick was established in 1898, and remained in operation until 1901. The community has the name of one Mr. Tedrick, the proprietor of a local mill.
