= Bertha, Missouri =

Unincorporated community in Missouri, U.S.

Coordinates: 36°50′16″N 92°23′05″W

Bertha is an unincorporated community in southern Douglas County, Missouri, United States. Bertha is located on the Fox Creek floodplain, just north of its junction with Bryant Creek on County Road 95-345, southeast of Gentryville.

== History ==
A post office called Bertha was established in 1903, and remained in operation until 1956. An early postmaster gave the community the first name of his daughter, Bertha Hawkins.
