= Vanzant, Missouri =

Unincorporated community in Missouri, U.S.

- Community
- Location of Vanzant, Missouri
- Coordinates: 36°58′13″N 92°18′12″W
- Country: U. S. A.
- State: Missouri
- County: Douglas County
- Elevation: 357 m (1,171 ft)
- Time zone: UTC-6 (CST)
  - Summer (DST): UTC-5 (CDT)
- Zip Code: 65768 (historical)
- GNIS feature ID: 752693

Vanzant is an Unincorporated community in northeastern Douglas County, Missouri, United States. It is located on Route 95 at the intersection with state route W, approximately one mile south of Route 76 and thirteen miles south of Mountain Grove. The community of Drury is about three miles south on Route 95. Vanzant post office was established in 1892 and was assigned a zip code of 65768. The community was named after an early settler.

Vanzant is located on a ridge at an elevation of 1,150 feet (350 m) between southward-flowing tributary streams of Bryant Creek, Fox Creek to the west and Brush Creek to the east. The Vanzant community church is located to the north at the intersection of Routes 95 and 76 and the Vanzant cemetery is about one half mile to the southeast on route W. The community is within the northwest corner of a section of the Mark Twain National Forest.
