= Buckhart, Missouri =

Unincorporated community in Missouri, U.S.

Coordinates: 36°53′38″N 92°19′09″W

Buckhart is an unincorporated community in Douglas County, Missouri, United States. The townsite is at an elevation of 876 feet (267 m) located on Brush Creek east of Missouri Route 95 on State Route CC. It is south of Drury and northeast of Gentryville.

== History ==
A post office called Buckhart was established in 1884, and remained in operation until 1957. The community was named for the fact a buck was killed near the original town site.
