= Cane Hollow =

Valley in the American state of Missouri

Cane Hollow is a valley in Douglas County in the Ozarks of southern Missouri.

The headwaters of the hollow are at 36°54′51″N 92°26′57″W and the confluence with Bryant Creek is at 36°53′12″N 92°28′12″W. The intermittent stream in the valley is spring fed. The valley source lies just south of County Road C-224 west of Missouri Route C. The stream flows south-southwest turning southwest and flowing parallel to Missouri Route 14. Just prior to its confluence it passes under Route 14 and enters Bryant Creek south of the Route 14 bridge and adjacent to a portion of the Rippee State Wildlife Management Area.

Cane Hollow was named for the canebrake the valley contained.
