= Dicky Creek =

Stream in Douglas County, Missouri

Dicky Creek (also spelled Dickey Creek) is a stream in Douglas County, Missouri. The stream originates on the south side of a ridge below Missouri State Highway 76 about 3.5 miles east of Ava and it flows south-southeast through a narrow valley for about 3.7 miles to its junction with Hunter Creek.

The coordinates of the source are 36°58′26″N 92°34′27″W; and the coordinates of the mouth are 35°55′28″N 92°32′36″W. The headwaters are at an elevation of about 1250 feet and the mouth is at an elevation of 863 feet.

Dicky Creek bears the name of the local Dickey family, who lived along its course.

== See also ==
- List of rivers of Missouri
