= List of Missouri conservation areas – Ozark region =

Map of Missouri conservation areas with the Ozark region highlighted

The Ozark administrative region of the Missouri Department of Conservation encompasses Carter, Dent, Douglas, Howell, Oregon, Ozark, Phelps, Pulaski, Ripley, Shannon, Texas, and Wright counties. The regional conservation office is in West Plains.

Conservation Area	Description	Size		County	Location
Allen (Wilbur) Memorial Conservation Area	This area contains forest, old fields, cropland, and grassland. Facilities/features: primitive camping, picnic area, and a permanent stream (Gasconade River).	383 acres	155 ha	Wright	37°23′56.87″N 92°24′9.26″W
Angeline Conservation Area	This rugged forest and old fields area has a hiking trail and 25 miles (40 km) of field roads open to horseback riders. It also offers access to the Jacks Fork and Current Rivers.	39,663 acres	16,051 ha	Shannon	37°11′54.64″N 91°27′5.76″W
Austin Lake	This is a forest area. Facilities/features: boat ramp, picnic areas and a pavilion, fishing dock, and Austin Community Lake (22 acres).	56 acres	23 ha	Texas	37°9′41.91″N 92°10′59.03″W
Baptist Camp Access	This forest area offers access to Big Piney River. There is a picnic area.	6 acres	2.4 ha	Texas	37°15′28.40″N 92°1′3.16″W
Barn Hollow Natural Area	This is a mostly forest area.	250 acres	100 ha	Texas	37°3′12.84″N 91°41′42.57″W
Barnes (P F) Conservation Area	This is a predominantly forest area.	118 acres	48 ha	Texas	37°18′21.96″N 92°8′11.23″W
Beaver Creek Conservation Area	This is a forest area. Facilities/features: picnic areas and a pavilion, archery range, intermittent stream (Beaver Creek).	147 acres	59 ha	Phelps	37°52′32.26″N 91°47′36.49″W
Birch Creek Conservation Area	This is a forest area.	5,578 acres	2,257 ha	Shannon	36°56′6.92″N 91°31′34.73″W
Blair Bridge Access	This is a forest area. Facilities/features: boat ramp, picnic area and permanent stream (North Fork of the White River).	7 acres	2.8 ha	Ozark	36°39′19.10″N 92°13′47.15″W
Bohigian Conservation Area	This area offers bank access to Mill Creek, especially for trout fishing.	427 acres	173 ha	Phelps	37°51′34.75″N 91°56′30.67″W
Boiling Spring Access	This area offers access to the Big Piney River. There is a boat ramp and a picnic area.	10 acres	4.0 ha	Texas	37°27′36.71″N 91°59′16.59″W
Brown (Gerhild and Graham) Conservation Area	This area is mostly forested, with four ponds.	191 acres	77 ha	Dent	37°40′25.25″N 91°39′5.55″W
Bull Shoals Lake Management Lands	Bull Shoals Lake ML has more than 16,000 acres (65 km^{2}) of fishable water. Permanent streams in the area include Swan Creek, Beaver Creek, Big Creek, Pond Fork, Little Norfork, and Spring Creek. The area also contains large tracts of forest and wetlands.	37,350 acres	15,120 ha	Taney, Ozark	36°34′9.17″N 92°51′43.27″W
Buttin Rock Access	The boat launch at this area is no longer available. Use the nearby Chilton Access.	11 acres	4.5 ha	Shannon	37°9′12.72″N 91°21′33.13″W
Buzzard Bluff Access	This mostly forest area offers access to the Gasconade River. Facilities/features: primitive camping and picnic area.	95 acres	38 ha	Wright	37°20′1.38″N 92°23′42.50″W
Cabool Towersite	This is a forest area.	16 acres	6.5 ha	Texas	37°9′27.60″N 92°8′34.17″W
Camp Branch Access	This forest and cropland area offers access to the Gasconade River.	22 acres	8.9 ha	Wright	37°15′48.99″N 92°27′57.17″W
Caney Mountain Conservation Area	This area contains forest, savanna, and dolomite glades. Facilities/features: firearms and archery ranges, Caney Mountain Natural Area (1,330 acres). Interpretive nature programs are held at various times during the year.	7,971 acres	3,226 ha	Ozark	36°41′24.38″N 92°26′18.88″W
Carter Creek Conservation Area	This is a forest area with a permanent stream (Bear Spring).	444 acres	180 ha	Carter	37°2′7.82″N 90°55′4.70″W
Cedar Gap Conservation Area	This is a forest area at the headwaters of Bryant Creek.	436 acres	176 ha	Wright	37°6′1.78″N 92°40′16.76″W
Cedar Grove Conservation Area	This is an entirely forested area.	880 acres	360 ha	Dent	37°26′0.13″N 91°33′4.68″W
Chilton (Joshua T.) Memorial Access	This area features a boat ramp and a canoe launch on the Jacks Fork River. It also has a privy and a pavilion.	1 acre	0.40 ha	Shannon	37°9′9.4″N 91°21′15.4″W
Clement (R F) Memorial Forest and Wildlife Area	This is a forest area.	513 acres	208 ha	Dent	37°45′0.13″N 91°46′51.73″W
Cook (Flo ) Access	This mostly forest area offers access to Bryant Creek (the upper end of Norfork lake). There is a boat ramp.	4 acres	1.6 ha	Ozark	36°36′29.04″N 92°18′22.40″W
Cover (Dan and Maureen) Memorial Wildlife Area	This area is mostly forest with old fields and glades. There is a small, fishable pond.	294 acres	119 ha	Oregon	36°40′27.30″N 91°30′7.61″W
Cover (Dan and Maureen) Prairie Conservation Area	The area is located on a large sinkhole plain and includes several large sinkholes. Species associated with these sinkholes include yellow lady's slipper, Turk's cap lily, and the state-listed royal catchfly. There are hiking trails and 2 parking lots.	744 acres	301 ha	Howell	36°35′23.69″N 91°41′23.24″W
Current River Conservation Area	This is a predominantly forest area. Facilities/features: picnic area, fishing jetties, Buford Pond (3 acres, fishable), Blue Springs Natural Area (17 acres), Cardareva Bluff Natural Area (95 aces), and a permanent stream (Current River).	29,777 acres	12,050 ha	Shannon, Reynolds, Carter	37°9′2.46″N 91°4′6.23″W
Davidson (Carrick W) - Robert G Paris Wildlife Area	About a quarter of this area is wooded. The rest is grass, crop land, and old fields. There is a hiking trail, several ponds, and Middle Fork Creek.	270 acres	110 ha	Howell	36°47′6.07″N 91°45′26.44″W
Davis (Dean) Conservation Area	This area features a hiking trail, a fishing pond, and an archery range.	186 acres	75 ha	Howell	36°54′0.63″N 91°54′46.71″W
Dogs Bluff Access	This area offers access to the Big Piney River. There is a boat ramp.	3 acres	1.2 ha	Texas	37°19′36.89″N 92°0′8.16″W
Doniphan Towersite	This area is mostly forest. No hunting is allowed.	10 acres	4.0 ha	Ripley	36°39′5.86″N 90°47′41.00″W
Eck (Peter A) Conservation Area	It contains an old growth, pine-oak forest and Eck Natural Area.	379 acres	153 ha	Texas	37°34′50.98″N 92°1′22.00″W
Fort Leonard Wood Towersite	This is a forest area.	66.7 acres	27.0 ha	Pulaski	37°49′17.98″N 92°6′58.98″W
Fourche Creek Conservation Area	The West Fork of Fourche Creek runs through this area.	3,782 acres	1,531 ha	Ripley	36°32′52.40″N 91°1′41.37″W
Fuson (John Alva, MD) Conservation Area	Facilities/features: picnic area and intermittent stream (Parks Creek).	1,516 acres	614 ha	Wright	37°27′45.59″N 92°37′38.90″W
Gasconade Hills Conservation Area	This is a forest area bordering the Gasconade River.	363 acres	147 ha	Pulaski	37°52′36.11″N 92°6′17.59″W
Gist Ranch Conservation Area	This area is predominantly forest with glades, savanna, and old fields. Facilities/features: primitive camping and 2 intermittent streams (Peters Creek, Sanders Branch).	11,094 acres	4,490 ha	Texas	37°10′22.83″N 91°46′58.07″W
Grandin Towersite	This is a forest area. (This may no longer be an MDC property, but information is inconclusive as of 2026-09.)	158 acres	64 ha	Ripley	36°46′15.68″N 90°43′56.52″W
Greenville Ford Access	This area offers bank access to the Little Black River and a picnic table.	4 acres	1.6 ha	Ripley	36°44′49.68″N 90°44′9.09″W
Grundy Memorial Wildlife Area	This is a forest area with a 3,370-foot (1,030 m)-loop field archery range trail.	37 acres	15 ha	Douglas	36°55′57.15″N 92°49′53.19″W
Hebron Access	This is a forest area. Facilities/features: boat ramp, primitive camping, and a permanent stream (North Fork of the White River).	13 acres	5.3 ha	Douglas	36°51′2.49″N 92°11′12.16″W
Hemenway Conservation Area	This area contains old fields, forest, and wetlands.	173 acres	70 ha	Ripley	36°32′44.81″N 90°39′13.10″W
Houston Towersite	This is a forest area.	13 acres	5.3 ha	Texas	37°20′20.64″N 92°5′22.20″W
Hunter Towersite	This is a forest area with a fire tower.	79 acres	32 ha	Carter	36°52′58.60″N 90°51′40.73″W
Indian Trail Conservation Area	This large area is primarily forest. Facilities/features: primitive camping, Indian Trail Fish Hatchery/Blackwell Lake (35 acres), picnic area, numerous small ponds, 2 permanent streams (Fishwater Creek, Crooked Creek).	13,556 acres	5,486 ha	Dent	37°43′30.29″N 91°22′12.91″W
Jerome Access	This area offers access to the Gasconade River. There is a boat ramp.	9 acres	3.6 ha	Phelps	37°56′2.73″N 91°58′40.97″W
Little Black Conservation Area	This is a predominantly forest area. Facilities/features: Picnic area, archery range, fishless ponds, intermittent stream (Barton Branch), and permanent stream (North and South Prongs of the Little Black River).	2,375 acres	961 ha	Ripley	36°45′2.65″N 90°47′7.79″W
Little Prairie Conservation Area	This area contains forest and old fields. Facilities/features: boat ramp, picnic areas, fishing dock, and Towell Lake (100 acres).	339 acres	137 ha	Phelps	37°59′47.78″N 91°41′46.10″W
Maramec Spring Fish Hatchery	The fish hatchery is owned and operated by MDC. It is inside Maramec Spring Park, which is operated by the James Foundation, and charges an entry fee.	16 acres	6.5 ha	Phelps	37°57′25.73″N 91°32′3.88″W
Martin (George and Vida) Access	This forest area offers access to the Warm Fork of the Spring River.	10 acres	4.0 ha	Oregon	36°32′7.09″N 91°31′3.41″W
Mason Bridge Access	This forest area offers access to the Big Piney River. There is a boat ramp.	9 acres	3.6 ha	Texas	37°30′16.18″N 91°58′59.19″W
Massengill (Richard) Conservation Area	This area contains forest and old fields.	203 acres	82 ha	Douglas	36°53′43.87″N 92°13′46.24″W
Midvale Conservation Area	This is a forest area.	85 acres	34 ha	Texas	37°12′20.37″N 91°44′15.71″W
Miller Lake	Facilities/features: boat ramp, picnic areas, and Miller Community Lake (20 acres).	61 acres	25 ha	Carter	37°2′52.48″N 90°54′19.48″W
Mineral Springs Access	This forest area offers access to the Big Piney River. There is a boat ramp.	6 acres	2.4 ha	Texas	37°21′46.72″N 91°58′12.14″W
Mitschele Access	This area offers access to the Gasconade River. There is a boat ramp.	0.3 acres	0.12 ha	Pulaski	37°48′3.18″N 92°20′26.35″W
Montauk Fish Hatchery	The hatchery is on the headwaters of the Current River. Facilities/features: 5 fishing jetties, 2 springs (Montauk Springs, Bluff Springs), Montauk Lake (5 acres).	1,340 acres	540 ha	Dent	37°27′10.72″N 91°40′52.79″W
Montauk Towersite	This is a forest area.	40 acres	16 ha	Dent	37°30′58.67″N 91°42′29.08″W
Mountain View Towersite	This is a forest area with a fire lookout tower.	30 acres	12 ha	Howell	36°59′38.51″N 91°45′27.19″W
Mudpuppy Conservation Area	Facilities/features: fishable pond (1 acre), intermittent stream (Flat Creek), and a permanent Stream (Little Black River).	1,384 acres	560 ha	Ripley	36°42′52.48″N 90°42′48.15″W
Myrtle Access	This forest area offers access to the Eleven Point River. There is a boat ramp.	27 acres	11 ha	Oregon	36°30′47.73″N 91°10′23.74″W
Norfork Lake Management Lands	This area contains mostly forest along with cropland, wetlands and glades. Facilities/features: boat ramp, boat rental, boat dock, improved camping, picnic area, and Norfork Lake (1,000 acres).	5,124 acres	2,074 ha	Ozark	36°33′36.32″N 92°16′49.45″W
Odin Access	This forest, old fields, and grassland area offers access to the Gasconade River.	127 acres	51 ha	Wright	37°16′4.06″N 92°36′35.64″W
Patrick Bridge Access	This area is mostly forest. Facilities/features: picnic areas and 2 permanent streams (Althea Spring, North Fork of the White River).	149 acres	60 ha	Ozark	36°38′34.80″N 92°13′15.44″W
Peck Ranch Conservation Area	This area is predominantly forest with nearly 1,500 acres (6.1 km^{2}) in glades, along with old fields, savanna, cropland and some wetlands. Facilities/features: primitive camping, picnic areas, firearms range, viewing deck, two deer/turkey blinds, one intermittent s	22,907 acres	9,270 ha	Shannon, Carter	37°2′42.70″N 91°10′47.44″W
Riddle Bridge Access	This area offers access to the Gasconade River. There is a boat ramp.	9 acres	3.6 ha	Pulaski	37°54′35.30″N 92°7′57.86″W
Rippee Conservation Area	This area is predominantly forest. Facilities/features: primitive camping, picnic areas, 2 permanent streams (Rippee Creek, Bryant Creek), Bryant Creek Natural Area (riparian corridor).	438 acres	177 ha	Douglas	36°52′27.50″N 92°28′8.79″W
Rocky Creek Conservation Area	With almost 40,000 acres (160 km^{2}) of public land, the Rocky Creek Conservation Area provides for a wide range of outdoor activities. These include nature viewing, bird watching, hiking, dispersed primitive camping, and many hunting and fishing opportunities. It also provides a canoe launch on the Current River.	37,894 acres	15,335 ha	Shannon, Reynolds, Carter	37°7′38.77″N 91°14′12.11″W
Rose Hill Towersite	This is a forest area.	8 acres	3.2 ha	Oregon	36°32′50.73″N 91°25′22.70″W
Ross Access	This area offers access to the Big Piney River.	3 acres	1.2 ha	Pulaski	37°40′8.97″N 92°2′56.63″W
Roubidoux Creek Conservation Area	This is a grassland, wetlands, and forest area on the Gasconade River and Roubidoux Creek.	185 acres	75 ha	Pulaski	37°50′44.07″N 92°12′13.76″W
Ryden Cave Conservation Area	This is a forest area.	30 acres	12 ha	Pulaski	37°39′12.10″N 92°2′20.92″W
Sand Pond Conservation Area	This area has a unique dune-swale ecosystem. It also offers opportunities for hiking, wildlife viewing, and hunting.	302 acres	122 ha	Ripley	36°30′8.23″N 90°36′2.86″W
Schlicht Springs Access	This is a mostly forest area offering access to the Gasconade River. There is a boat ramp.	15 acres	6.1 ha	Pulaski	37°54′10.48″N 92°17′8.53″W
Shannon Ranch Conservation Area	This area contains forest, grassland, savanna and glades. Facilities/features: primitive camping and several intermittent streams.	1,571 acres	636 ha	Douglas	36°56′51.18″N 92°19′1.43″W
Shawnee Mac Lakes Conservation Area	This area contains forest and grassland. Facilities/features: 2 boat ramps, primitive camping, picnic area, pavilion, a fishing jetty, and 2 fishable lakes (Ziske Lake, 30 acres (120,000 m^{2}); Turner Lake, 17 acres).	249 acres	101 ha	Dent	37°38′48.51″N 91°30′45.43″W
Short Bend Access	This forest and old fields area offers access to the Meramec River.	76 acres	31 ha	Dent	37°44′59.72″N 91°25′38.29″W
Simmons Ford Access	This area offers access to the Big Piney River.	3 acres	1.2 ha	Texas	37°14′26.74″N 92°0′37.93″W
Sims Valley Lake	Facilities/features: boat ramp, picnic area, and Sims Valley Community Lake (41 acres).	100 acres	40 ha	Howell	37°0′35.02″N 91°50′54.91″W
South Prong Access	This forest area offers access to the South Prong of Jacks Fork.	2 acres	0.81 ha	Texas	37°4′41.25″N 91°44′11.73″W
Summersville Towersite	This was the former location of a fire tower in the midst of Gist Ranch Conservation Area.	31 acres	13 ha	Texas	37°11′38.73″N 91°46′32.58″W
Sunklands Conservation Area	This is a predominantly forest area with savanna and glades. Facilities/features: Sunklands Natural Area, numerous small streams, and permanent stream (Current River).	38,821 acres	15,710 ha	Shannon	37°19′17.29″N 91°29′16.59″W
Sycamore Access	This forest area offers access to Bryant Creek.	15 acres	6.1 ha	Ozark	36°42′23.82″N 92°15′55.71″W
Tecumseh Towersite	This is a forest area.	40 acres	16 ha	Ozark	36°35′53.67″N 92°13′56.72″W
Timber Knob Towersite	This area is completely forested and contains a fire tower.	41 acres	17 ha	Ozark	36°33′52.45″N 92°28′5.39″W
Tingler Prairie Conservation Area	This area contains prairie and forest. Facilities/features: Tingler Lake (3 acres) and permanent stream.	255 acres	103 ha	Howell	36°36′42.61″N 91°52′26.57″W
Twin Pines Conservation Education Center	Twin Pines has a visitor center, hiking trail, archery range, outside exhibits, and forest management demonstration areas.	462 acres	187 ha	Shannon	36°59′39.51″N 91°18′20.19″W
Vanderhoef (Archie and Gracie) Memorial State Forest	This area is mostly forest. Facilities/features: picnic area, viewing deck, and permanent stream (South Fork of the Spring River).	145 acres	59 ha	Howell	36°33′9.59″N 91°53′10.18″W
Vera Cruz Access	This area contains forest and old fields. Facilities/features: picnic area and 2 permanent streams (Hunter Creek and Bryant Creek).	78 acres	32 ha	Douglas	36°55′4.96″N 92°29′46.66″W
Warm Fork Conservation Area	This area is mostly grassland mixed with old fields and cropland.	159 acres	64 ha	Oregon	36°37′4.32″N 91°33′46.10″W
Warren Bridge Access	This forest area offers access to Bryant Creek.	8 acres	3.2 ha	Ozark	36°40′3.08″N 92°16′53.14″W
White (George O) State Forest Nursery	Nursery tours are available by prior arrangement. Facilities/features: Quercus Flatwoods Natural Area (48 acres of post oak flatwoods), picnic area, and fishable 3-acre (12,000 m^{2}) lake.	754 acres	305 ha	Texas	37°33′16.39″N 91°53′7.44″W
White Ranch Conservation Area	This area is predominantly forest. Facilities/features: primitive camping, picnic area, 15 trails, firearms range, and permanent stream (South Fork of the Spring River).	6,685 acres	2,705 ha	Howell	36°32′13.23″N 91°50′28.24″W
White River Trace Conservation Area	This area is managed for upland wildlife habitat. There are several hiking trails and primitive camping.	2,043 acres	827 ha	Dent	37°37′1.76″N 91°43′48.76″W
Woods (Woodson K) Memorial Conservation Area	This area is predominantly forest. Facilities/features: gravel bar boat launch (no concrete ramp) and 2 permanent streams (Dry Fork Creek, Meramec River).	5,739 acres	2,322 ha	Phelps, Crawford	37°57′42.42″N 91°30′59.84″W

== Notes ==
- Acreage and counties from MDCLand GIS file
- Names, descriptions, and locations from Conservation Atlas Online GIS file
