= Bill Macks Creek =

Stream in the American state of Missouri

Location
- Country: United States
- State: Missouri
- Region: Douglas County

Physical characteristics
- Source
  - coordinates: 36°59′49″N 92°36′04″W
  - elevation: 1,120 ft (340 m)
- Mouth
  - coordinates: 36°58′53″N 92°31′29″W
  - elevation: 902 ft (275 m)

Bill Macks Creek is a stream in Douglas County, Missouri. The stream headwaters lie just east of Basher and the junction of Missouri Route 76 with Missouri Route U. The stream flows east-southeast to its confluence with Bryant Creek.

Bill Macks Creek has the name of Bill Mac, a pioneer trapper.

== See also ==
- List of rivers of Missouri
