= Girdner, Missouri =

Unincorporated community in Missouri, U.S.

- Historic community
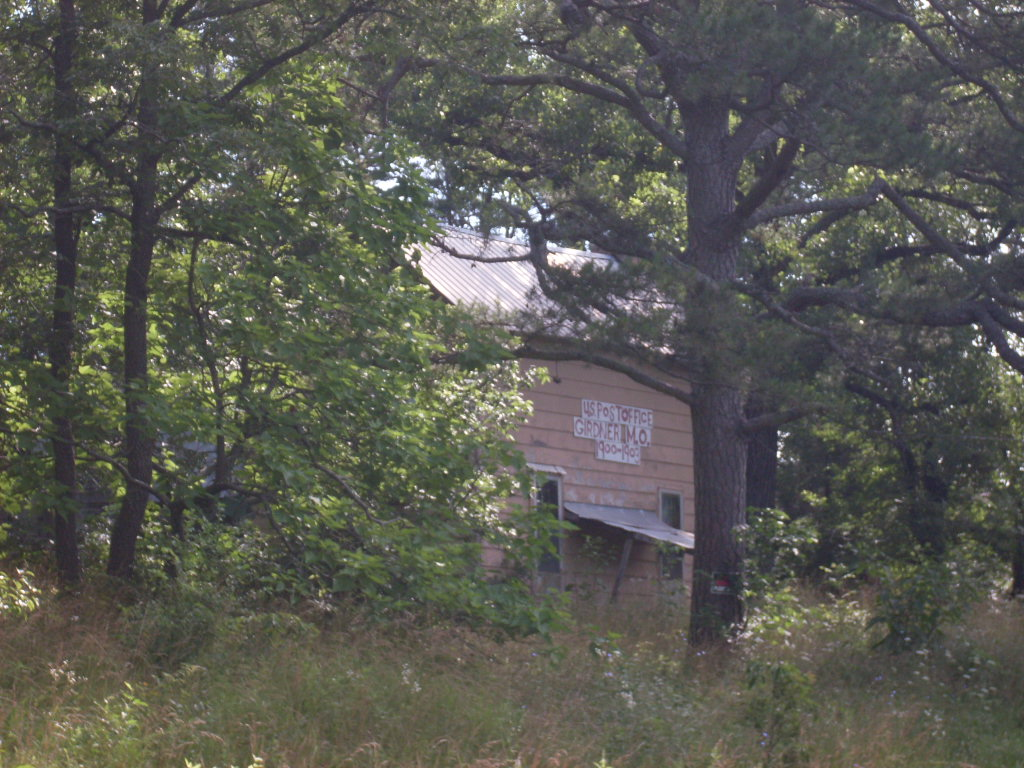
- The old Girdner post office

- Location of Girdner, Missouri
- Coordinates: 36°51′14″N 92°35′14″W
- Country: U. S. A.
- State: Missouri
- County: Douglas County
- Elevation: 320 m (1,050 ft)
- Time zone: UTC-6 (CST)
  - Summer (DST): UTC-5 (CDT)
- GNIS feature ID: 750044

Girdner is an unincorporated community in Douglas County, in the U.S. state of Missouri. Girdner is located in central Douglas County, southeast of Ava, on Missouri Route P and the north side of Rippee Creek, a tributary of Bryant Creek.

== History ==
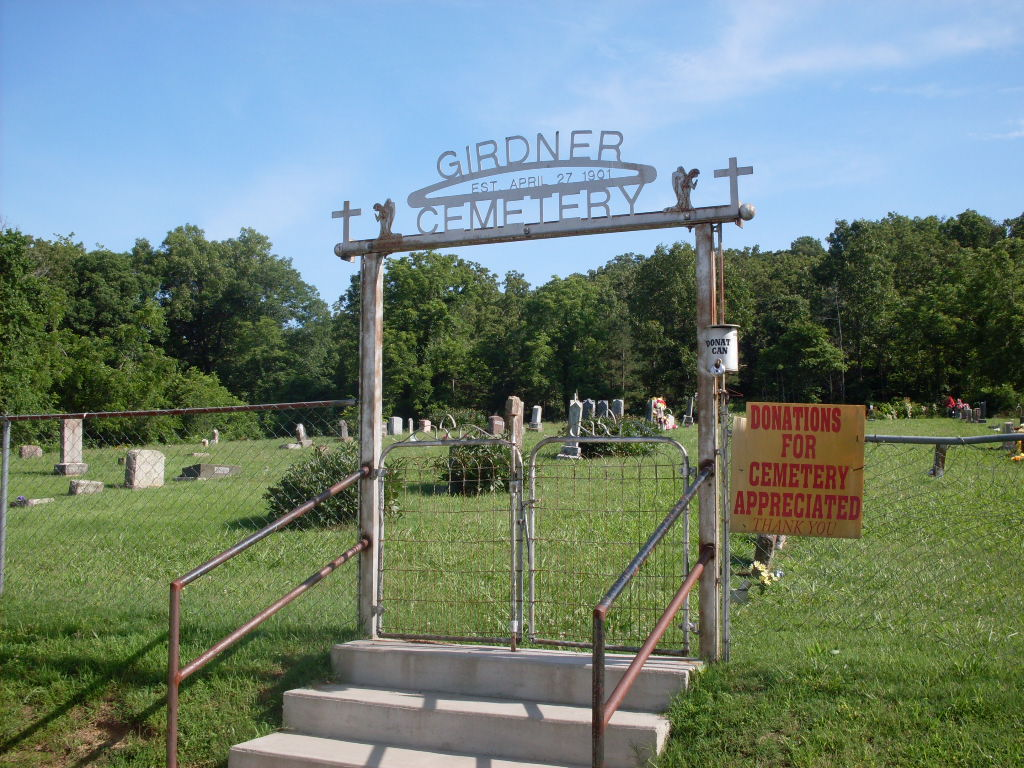
The cemetery at Girdner, Missouri

A post office called Girdner was established in 1885, and remained in operation until 1942. The community has the name of "Doc" Girdner, a pioneer citizen.
