= Rippee Creek =

Stream in the American state of Missouri

Location
- Country: United States
- State: Missouri
- Region: Douglas County

Physical characteristics
- Source
  - coordinates: 36°51′00″N 92°37′05″W
- Mouth
  - coordinates: 36°52′13″N 92°28′22″W
  - elevation: 781 ft (238 m)

Rippee Creek is a stream in southern Douglas County, Missouri. The stream starts in a hillside valley just east of Squires at an elevation just above 1200 feet and flows eastward past the Girdner community on Missouri Route P and on to its confluence with Bryant Creek at an elevation of 781 feet within the Rippee State Wildlife Management Area.
