= Larissa, Missouri =

Historic town in the American state of Missouri

Coordinates: 36°55′55″N 92°34′36″W

Larissa is an historic town located along Hunter Creek in Douglas County, Missouri, United States. The GNIS classifies it as a populated place. Larissa was located on the north part of the floodplain of Hunter Creek, along county road VV-210, at an elevation of 935 feet. The location is approximately one mile upstream (northwest) of the Crystal Springs fish hatchery.

A post office called Larissa was established in 1888, and remained in operation until 1919. An early postmaster gave the community the name of his wife, Larissa Andrews.
