= Hunter Creek (Bryant Creek tributary) =

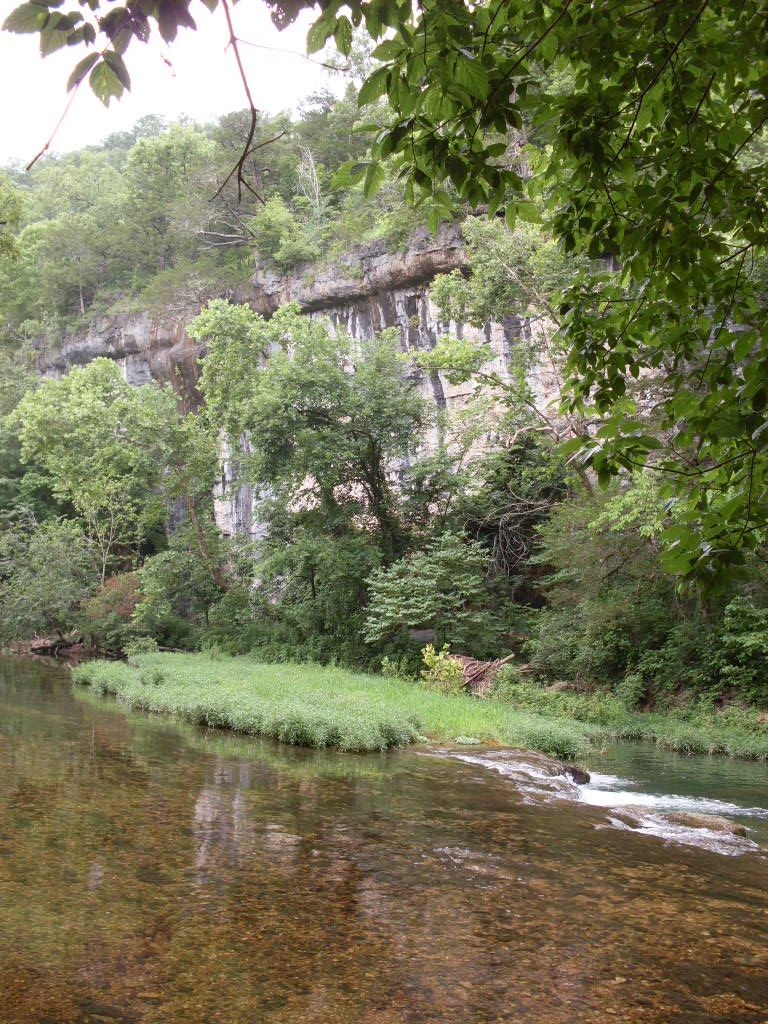
- The bluff along the north shore of Hunter Creek at Vera Cruz

Location
- Country: United States
- State: Missouri
- Region: Douglas County

Physical characteristics
- Source
  - coordinates: 36°59′27″N 92°38′56″W
  - elevation: 1,300 ft (400 m)
- Mouth
  - coordinates: 36°55′01″N 92°29′40″W
  - elevation: 817 ft (249 m)

Hunter Creek is a stream in Douglas County, Missouri. It is a tributary of Bryant Creek. Hunter Creek headwaters arise north of Ava along the south of a ridge and Missouri Route 76. The stream flows southeast along State Route FF and is further fed by Turkey Creek from the north, Wildcat Creek from the southwest and the springwaters of the rainbow trout hatchery at Crystal Springs. The stream flows on to the east gaining the tributaries of Whites Creek and Dicky Creek before joining Bryant Creek at Vera Cruz. The community of Larissa was located along Hunter Creek near Crystal Springs.

Hunter Creek was named for the hunting activity there by pioneers.

== See also ==
- List of rivers of Missouri
