= Whites Creek (Hunter Creek tributary) =

Stream in Missouri

- Whites Creek adjacent to Missouri Route 14 six miles east of Ava

Location
- Country: United States
- State: Missouri
- County: Douglas

Physical characteristics
- Source
  - coordinates: 36°54′22″N 92°38′18″W
  - elevation: 1,250 ft (380 m)
- Mouth
  - coordinates: 36°55′28″N 92°32′36″W
  - elevation: 863 ft (263 m)

Whites Creek is an Ozark stream in Douglas County, Missouri. It is a tributary of Hunter Creek.

The headwaters are at an elevation of about 1,250 feet and the mouth is at an elevation of 863 feet.

Whites Creek begins as a south flowing stream on the south side of Table Rock Knob just southeast of Ava and flows south for a short distance before turning east. The stream runs parallel to Missouri Route 14 and is bridged where the road turns south. Hoffmeister Spring emerges from a bluff along the north side of the stream a few hundred yards east of the bridge at 36°54′51″N 92°33′12″W and an elevation of 892 feet.

Whites Creek has the name of a pioneer citizen with the surname White.

== See also ==
- List of rivers of Missouri
