= Coldspring, Missouri =

Unincorporated community in Missouri, U.S.

Coordinates: 36°58′18″N 92°25′50″W

Coldspring (also spelled out Cold Spring) is an unincorporated community in north central Douglas County, in the Ozarks of southern Missouri. The community is located on Missouri Route 76 and Clever Creek.

== History ==
A post office called Cold Spring was established in 1875, the name was changed to Coldspring in 1894, and the post office closed in 1957. The community was so named on account of there being a spring near the original town site.
