= Drury, Missouri =

Unincorporated community in Missouri, U.S.

- Community
- Location of Drury, Missouri Drury, Missouri (the United States)
- Coordinates: 36°55′53″N 92°19′25″W
- Country: U. S. A.
- State: Missouri
- County: Douglas County
- Elevation: 368 m (1,207 ft)
- Time zone: UTC-6 (CST)
  - Summer (DST): UTC-5 (CDT)
- Zip Code: 65638 (historical)
- GNIS feature ID: 749698

Drury is an unincorporated community in Douglas County, Missouri, United States. It is located approximately fifteen miles south of Mountain Grove and about three miles south of Vanzant on Route 95.

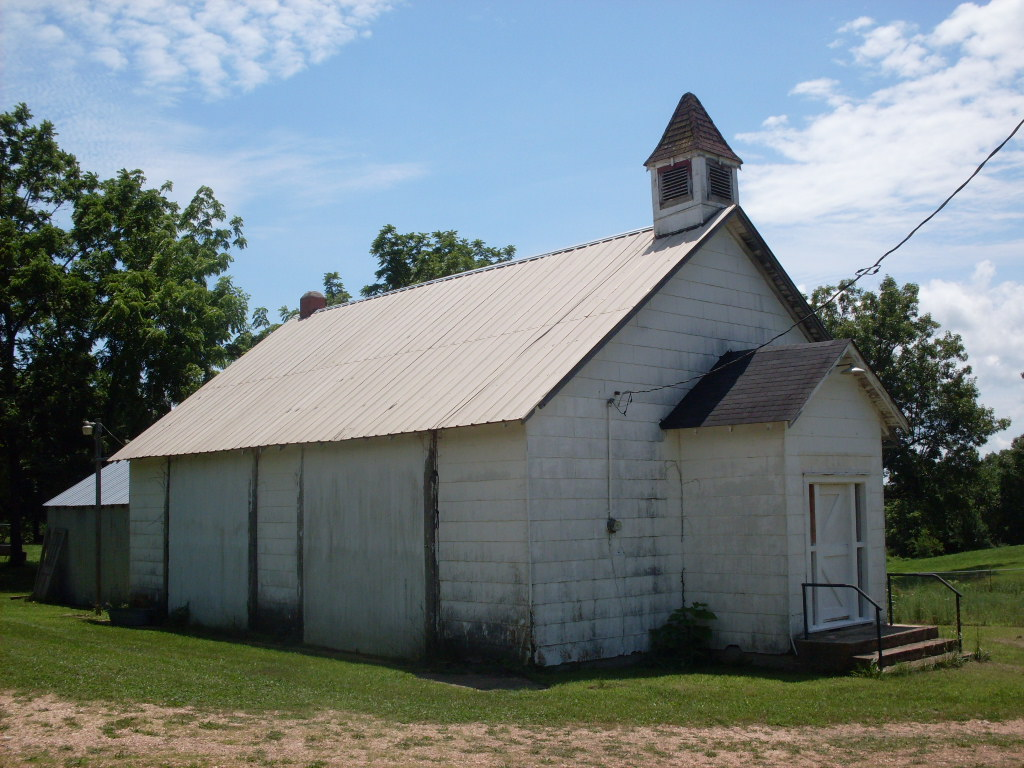
Old church building beside Route 95 in Drury, Missouri

Drury had a post office from 1893 until 2003, using zip code 65638. The community has the name of the local Drury family.

Drury is located on a ridge at an approximate elevation of 1,215 feet (370 m), between south flowing tributaries of Bryant Creek.
