= Turpentine Run =

Stream in the United States Virgin Islands

Coordinates: 18.3224°N 64.8777°W

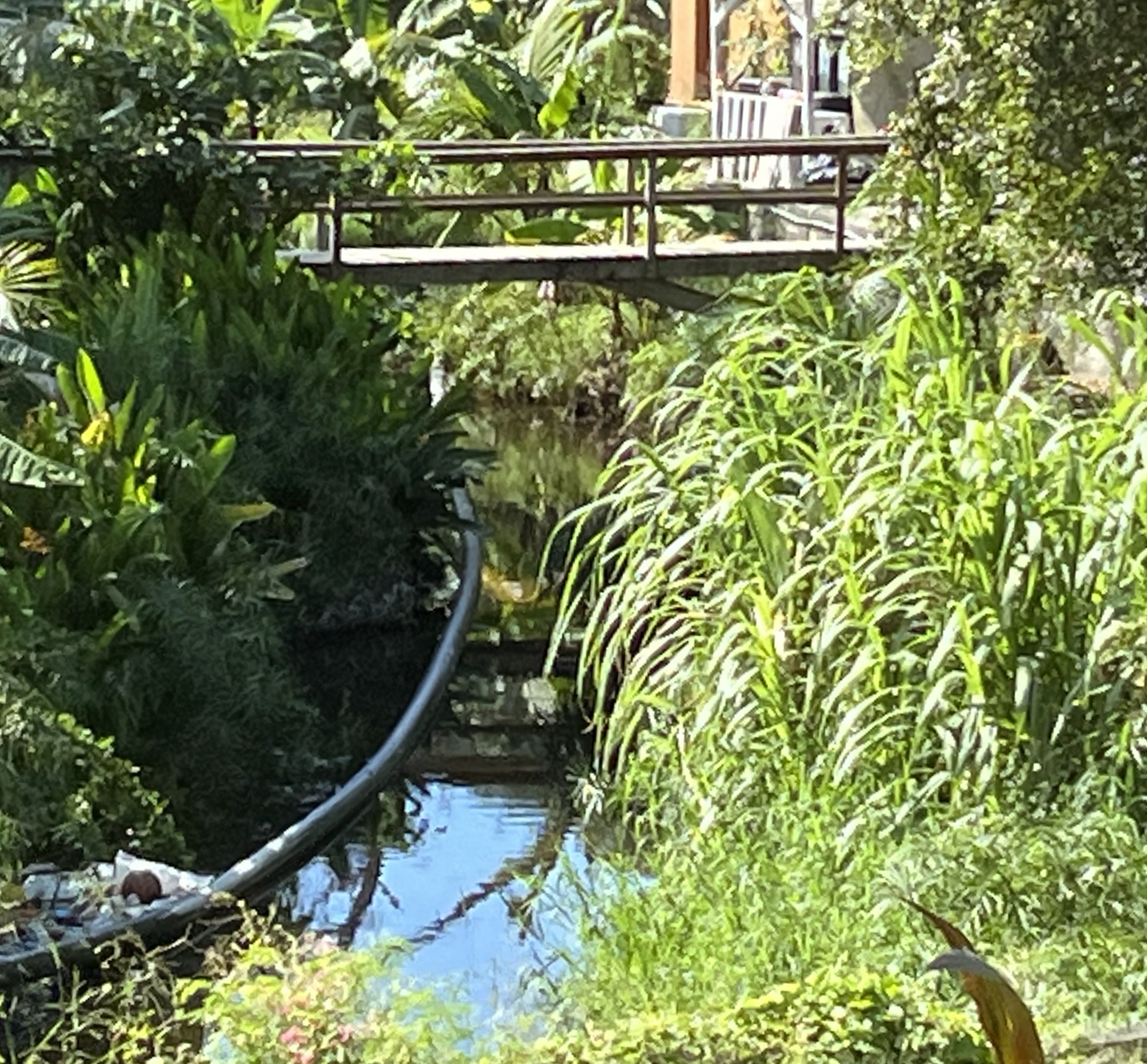
Turpentine Run

Turpentine Run is a stream in the United States Virgin Islands.
