= Brush Creek (Bryant Creek tributary) =

Stream in the American state of Missouri

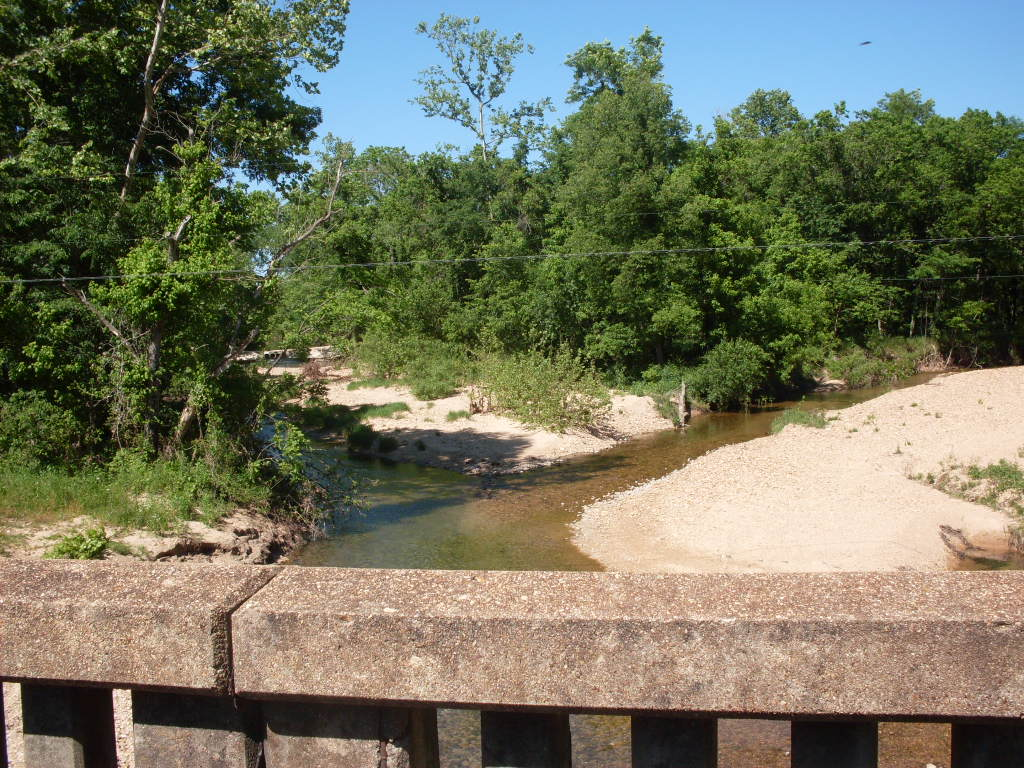
- Brush Creek looking north from Missouri route 14 bridge. Confluence of Little Brush Creek (right) and Brush Creek (left)

Location
- Country: United States
- State: Missouri
- Region: Douglas County and Ozark County

Physical characteristics
- Source
  - coordinates: 36°55′09″N 92°15′31″W
- Mouth
  - coordinates: 36°46′49″N 92°20′56″W
  - elevation: 692 ft (211 m)

Brush Creek is a southwest flowing stream in Douglas and Ozark counties in the Ozarks of south central Missouri. It is a tributary of Bryant Creek.

The stream headwaters start on the southwest flank of Twin Knobs Peak (elevation 1404 Feet) as an intermittent stream flowing to the southwest. The stream crosses Missouri Route W just southwest of its source and passes the community of Buckhart. It continues on to the southwest crossing under Missouri Route 14 about 1.5 miles east of Gentryville. It continues on to the southwest paralleling Missouri Route 95 and enters Ozark County and about one mile further south meets its confluence with Bryant Creek. The elevation of the confluence is 692 feet.
