= Guinea Gut =

- Location within the U.S. Virgin Islands

Location
- Country: United States
- Territory: United States Virgin Islands

Physical characteristics
- Mouth
  - coordinates: 18°19′24″N 64°47′16″W

Guinea Gut is a stream in the United States Virgin Islands.
