= Gentryville, Douglas County, Missouri =

Unincorporated community in Douglas County, Missouri, United States

Gentryville, Missouri
- Unincorporated community
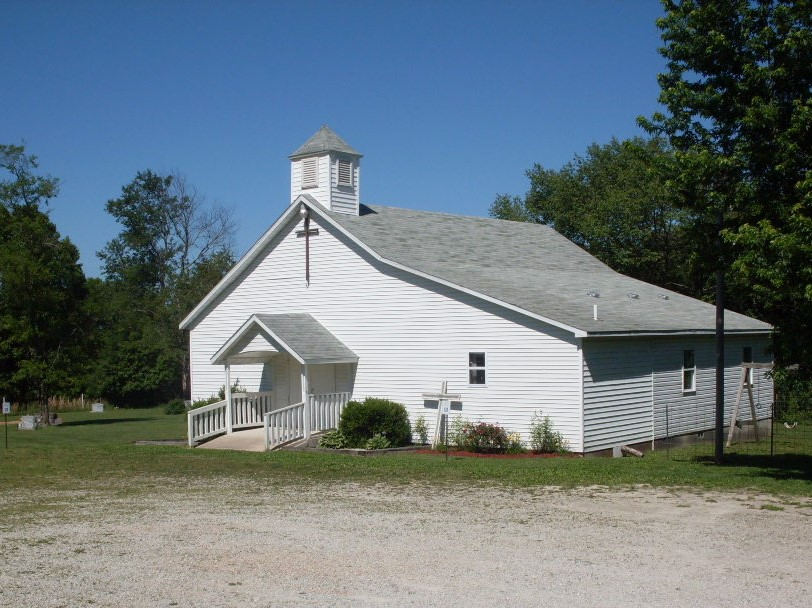
- Church and cemetery on Missouri Route 95 at Gentryville, May 2017

- Location of Gentryville, Missouri Gentryville, Missouri (the United States)
- Coordinates: 36°51′49″N 92°21′38″W
- Country: U. S. A.
- State: Missouri
- County: Douglas County
- Elevation: 339 m (1,112 ft)
- Time zone: UTC-6 (CST)
  - Summer (DST): UTC-5 (CDT)
- GNIS feature ID: 718391

Gentryville is an unincorporated community in Douglas County, Missouri, United States.

== Description ==
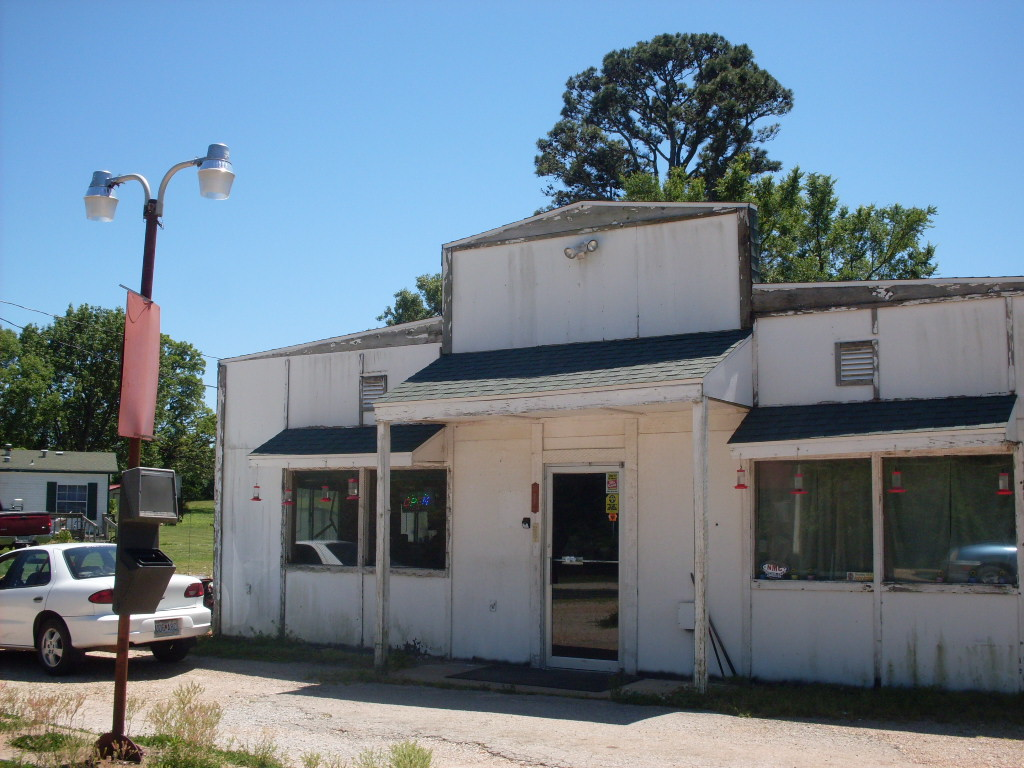
Old Gentryville store at junction of Missouri Route 14 and Missouri Route 95 in Gentryville, May 2017

The community is located approximately 21 miles (34 km) southeast of Ava and 22 miles (35 km) south of Mountain Grove at the intersection of Missouri Route 14 and Missouri Route 95. It consists of a small general store, an automotive repair shop, and a few churches. Gentryville cemetery and church are located about one-quarter mile north on Route 95.

Gentryville is located on a narrow ridge at 1,112 feet (339 m) elevation between Fox and Brush creeks, both tributaries to Bryant Creek, which is a major tributary to the North Fork River.
