= Champion, Missouri =

Unincorprated community in Douglas County, Missouri, United States

Coordinates: 36°55′53″N 92°23′28″W

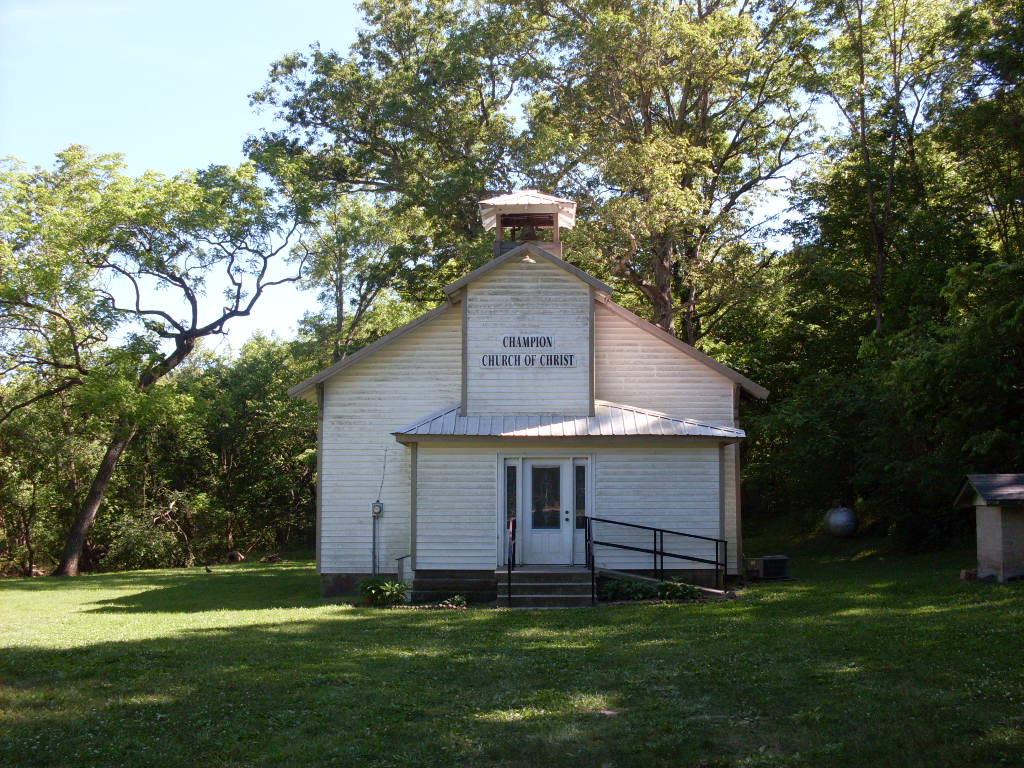
Old church building at Champion, May 2017i

Champion is an unincorporated community in central Douglas County, Missouri, United States. It is located along Missouri Route WW, on the west bank of Fox Creek.
