= Fish Bay Gut =

Stream in the United States Virgin Islands

Coordinates: 18.32387°N 64.765137°W

Fish Bay Gut is a stream in the United States Virgin Islands.
