= Cob Gut =

Stream in the U.S. Virgin Islands

Coordinates: 18.31468°N 64.71290°W

Cob Gut is a stream in the United States Virgin Islands.
