= Stream =

Body of surface water flowing down a channel

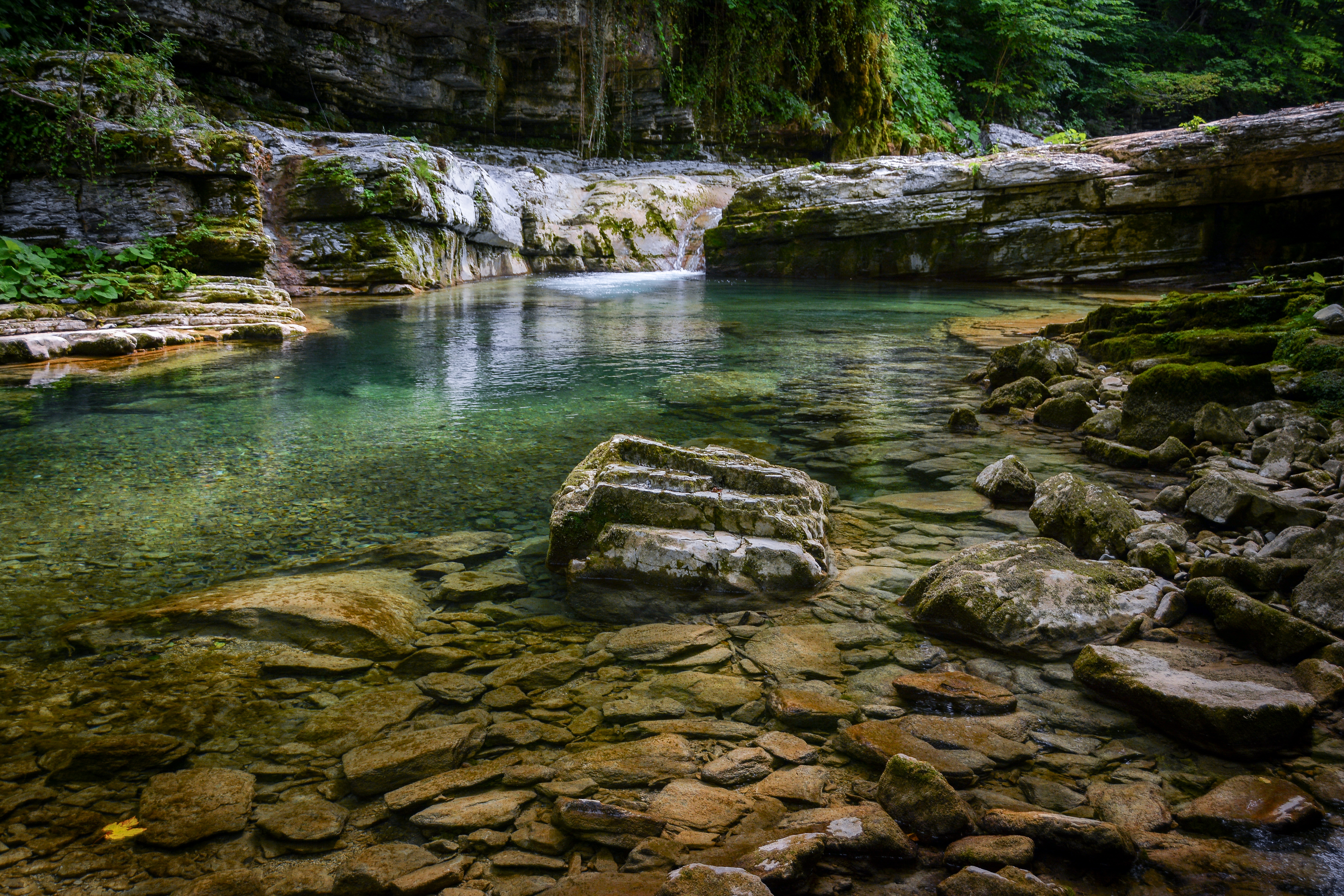
Cvrcka in Bosnia

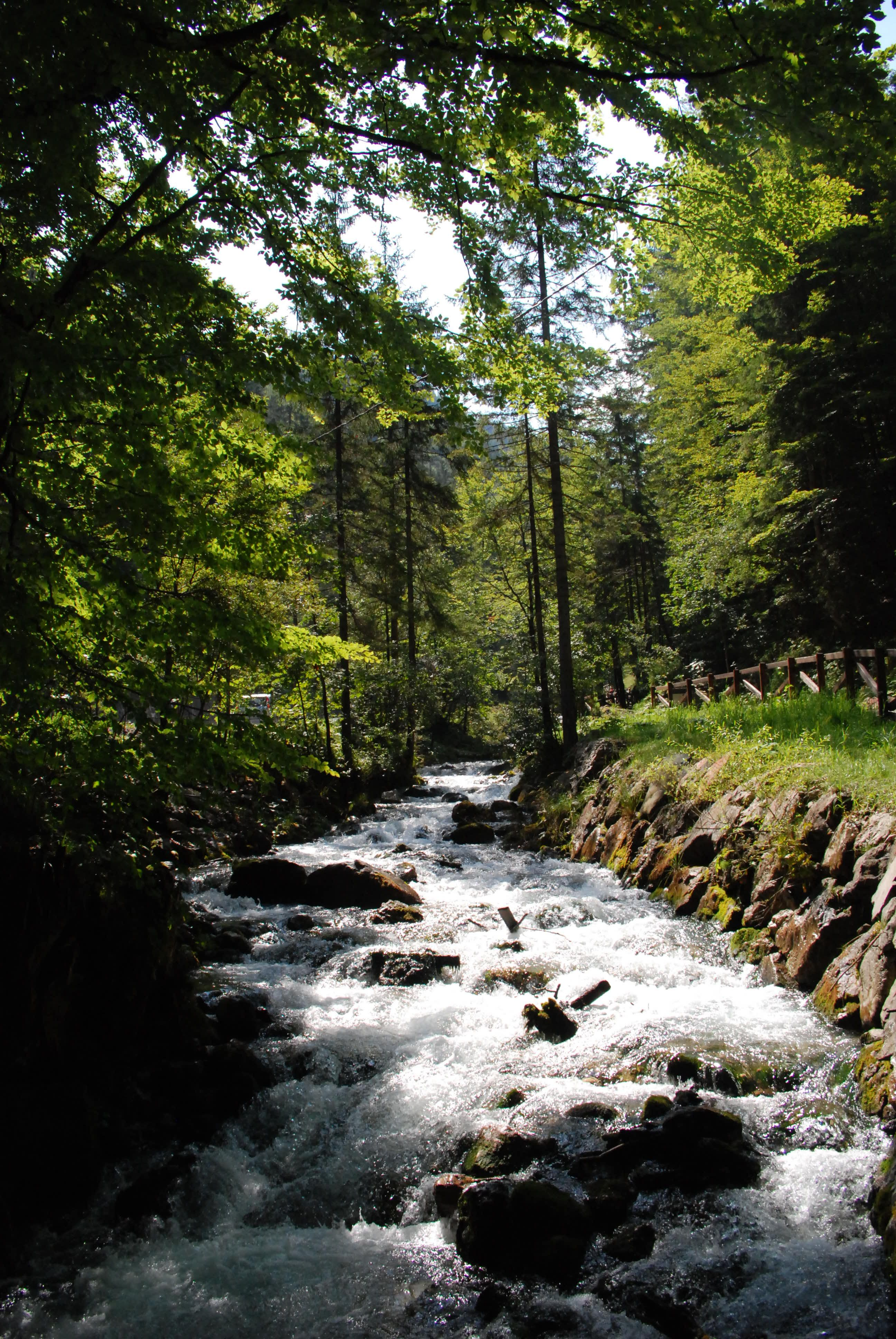
Rocky stream in Italy

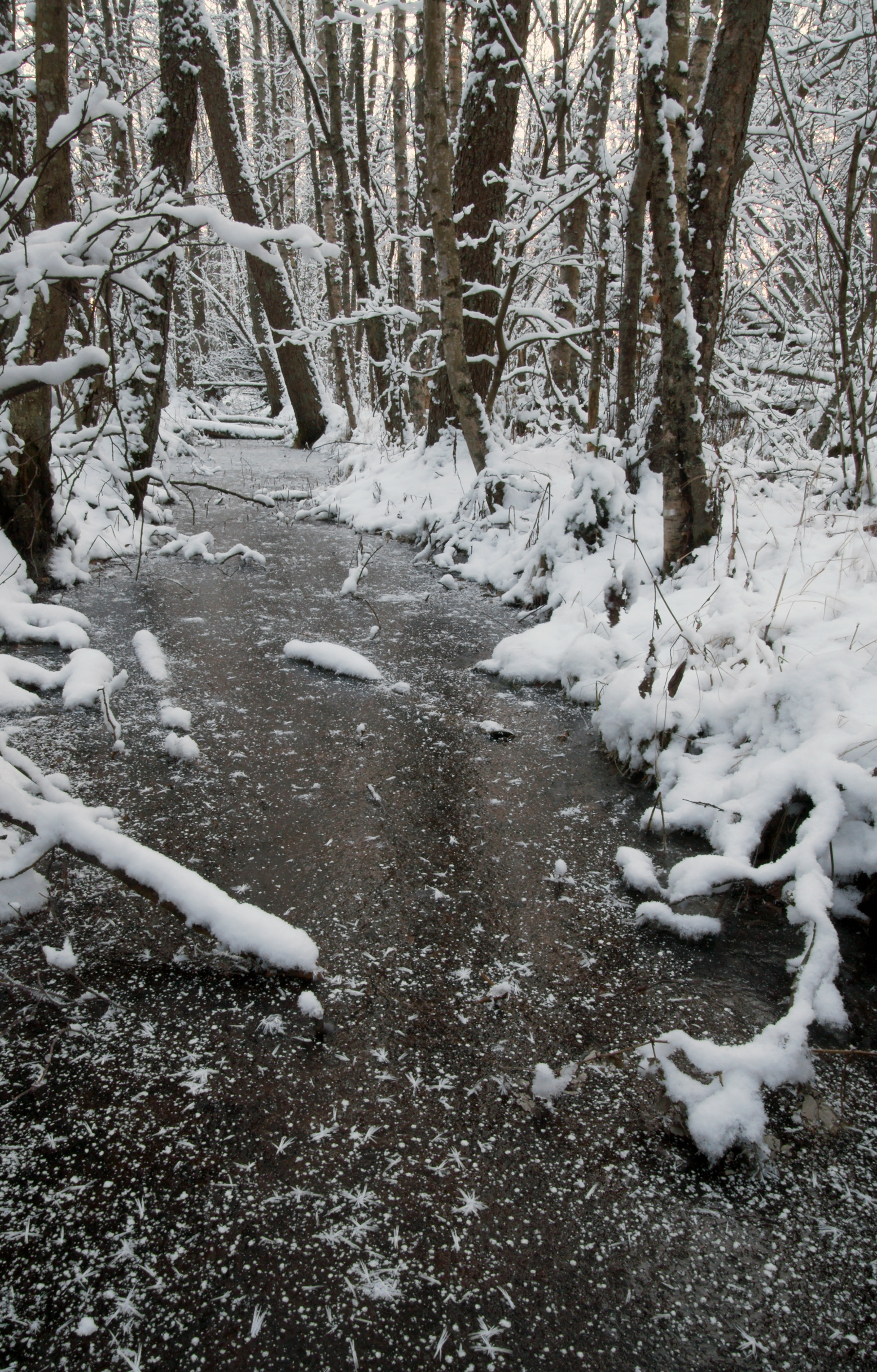
Frozen stream in Enäjärvi, Pori, Finland

A stream is a continuous body of surface water flowing within the bed and banks of a channel. The channel is a watercourse, although the watercourse may be seasonally or periodically dry. Depending on its location or certain characteristics, a stream may be referred to by a variety of local or regional names. A long, large stream is usually called a river, while a smaller, less voluminous, and more intermittent stream is known as a creek or tributary, among other names.

The flow of a stream is controlled by three inputs – surface runoff (from precipitation or meltwater), daylighted subterranean water, and surface groundwater (spring water). The surface and subterranean water are highly variable between periods of rainfall. Groundwater, on the other hand, has a relatively constant input and is controlled more by long-term patterns of precipitation. The stream encompasses surface, subsurface and groundwater fluxes that respond to geological, geomorphological, hydrological and biotic controls.

Streams are important as conduits in the water cycle, instruments in groundwater recharge, and corridors for fish and wildlife migration. The biological habitat in the immediate vicinity of a stream is called a riparian zone. Given the status of the ongoing Holocene extinction, streams play an important corridor role in connecting fragmented habitats and thus in conserving biodiversity. The study of streams and waterways in general is known as surface hydrology and is a core element of environmental geography.

== Types ==
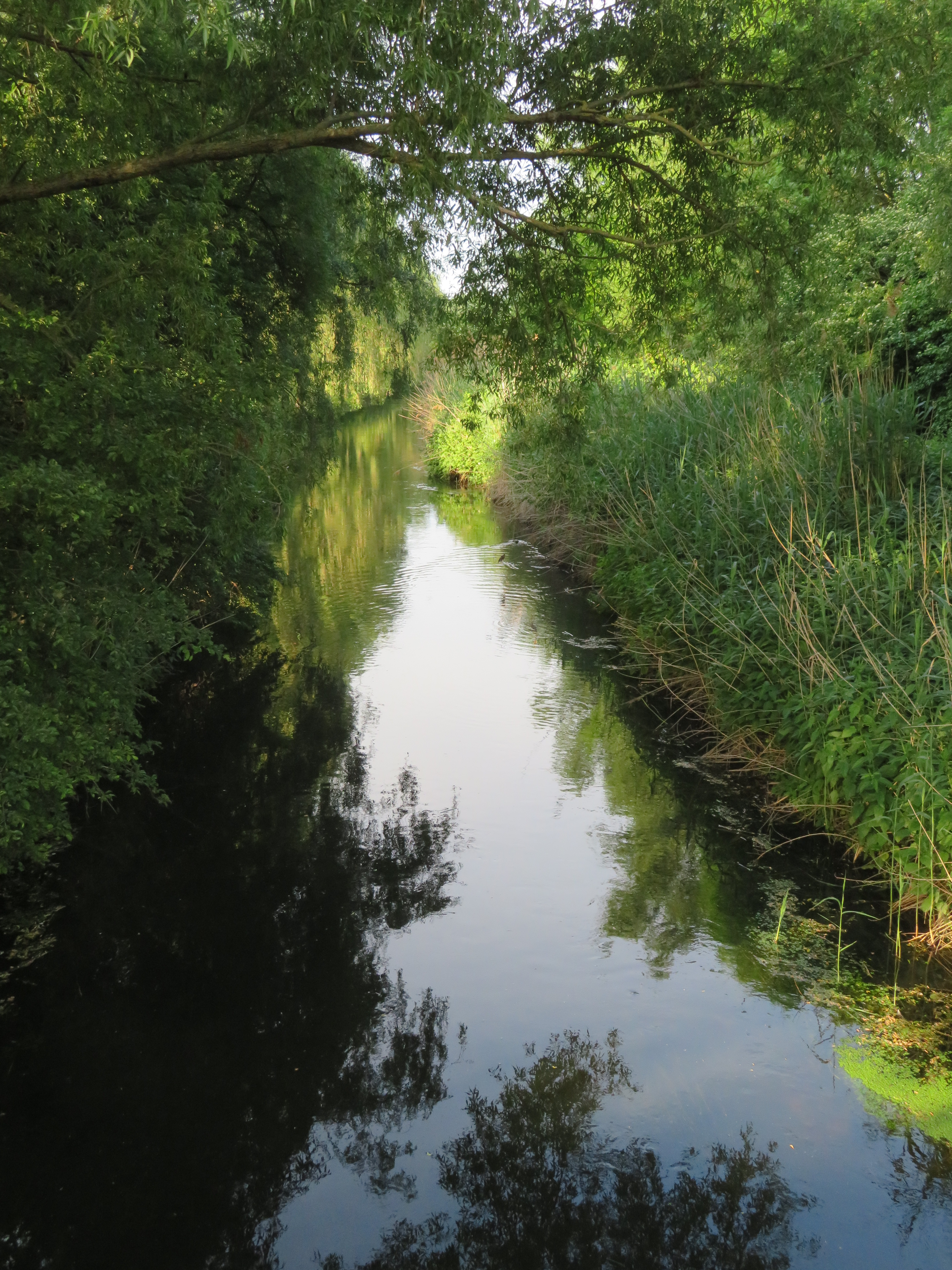
Stream with low gradient surrounded by natural riparian vegetation (Rhineland-Palatinate)

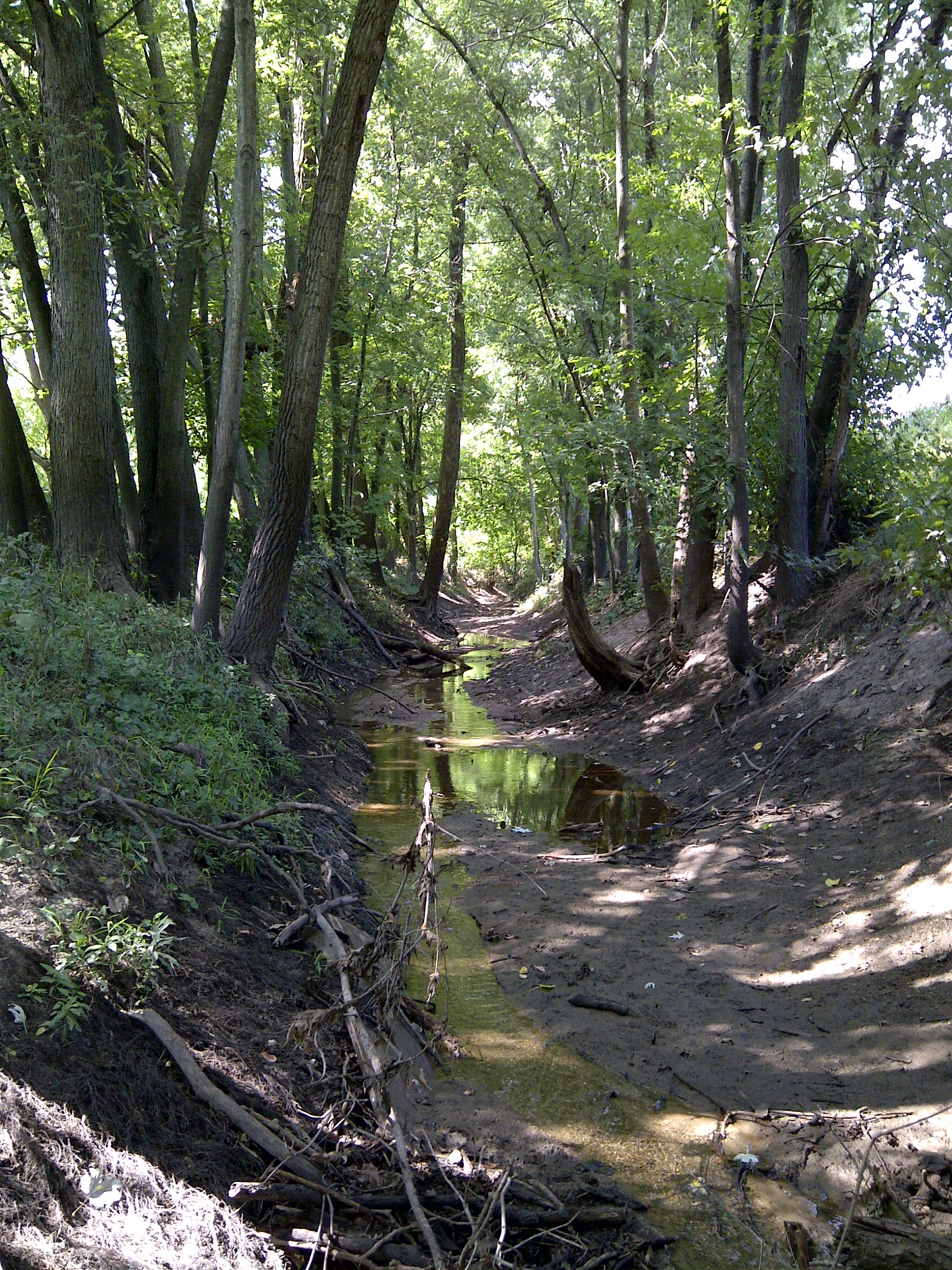
A low level stream in Macon County, Illinois

=== Brook ===
A brook is a stream smaller than a creek, especially one that is fed by a spring or seep. It is usually small and easily forded. A brook is characterised by its shallowness.

=== Creek ===
A creek (/kriːk/) or crick (/krɪk/):

- In Australia, Canada, New Zealand and the United States, a (narrow) stream that is smaller than a river; a minor tributary of a river; a brook. Sometimes navigable by water craft and may be intermittent.
- In the United Kingdom, India, and parts of Maryland, New England, a tidal inlet, typically in a salt marsh or mangrove swamp, or between enclosed and drained former salt marshes or swamps (e.g. Portsbridge Creek separating Portsea Island from the mainland). In these cases, the "stream" is the tidal stream, the course of the seawater through the creek channel at low and high tide.

In hydrography, gut is a small creek; this is seen in proper names in eastern North America from the Mid-Atlantic states (for instance, The Gut in Pennsylvania, Ash Gut in Delaware, and other streams) down into the Caribbean (for instance, Guinea Gut, Fish Bay Gut, Cob Gut, Battery Gut and other rivers and streams in the United States Virgin Islands, in Jamaica (Sandy Gut, Bens Gut River, White Gut River), and in many streams and creeks of the Dutch Caribbean).

=== River ===
A river is a large natural stream that is much wider and deeper than a creek and not easily fordable, and may be a navigable waterway.

=== Runnel ===
The linear channel between the parallel ridges or bars on a shoreline beach or river floodplain, or between a bar and the shore. Also called a swale.

=== Tributary ===
A tributary is a contributory stream to a larger stream, or a stream which does not reach a static body of water such as a lake, bay or ocean but joins another river (a parent river). Sometimes also called a branch or fork.

=== Distributary ===
A distributary, or a distributary channel, is a stream that branches off and flows away from a main stream channel, and the phenomenon is known as river bifurcation. Distributaries are common features of river deltas, and are often found where a valleyed stream enters wide flatlands or approaches the coastal plains around a lake or an ocean. They can also occur inland, on alluvial fans, or where a tributary stream bifurcates as it nears its confluence with a larger stream. Common terms for individual river distributaries in English-speaking countries are arm and channel.

== Other names ==
There are a number of regional names for a stream.

=== Northern America ===
- Branch is used to name streams in Maryland, Virginia and much of the United States.
- Creek is common throughout the United States, as well as Australia.
- Falls is also used to name streams in Maryland, for streams/rivers which have waterfalls on them, even if such falls only have a small vertical drop. Little Gunpowder Falls, Gwynns Falls, and the Jones Falls are actually rivers named in this manner, unique to Maryland.
- Kill in New York, Pennsylvania, Delaware, and New Jersey comes from a Dutch language word meaning "riverbed" or "water channel", and can also be used for the UK meaning of 'creek'.
- Run in Ohio, Maryland, Michigan, New Jersey, Pennsylvania, Virginia, or West Virginia can be the name of a stream.
- Run in Florida is the name given to streams coming out of small natural springs. River is used for streams from larger springs like the Silver River and Rainbow River.
- Stream and brook are used in Midwestern states, Mid-Atlantic states, and New England.
- Gut is sometimes used for a small creek, from the Mid-Atlantic states down into the Caribbean (see above).

=== United Kingdom ===
- Allt is used in the Scottish Highlands.
- Beck is used in an area between Lincolnshire, County Durham and Cumbria which were areas once occupied by the Danes and Norwegians.
- Bourne or winterbourne is used in the chalk downland of southern England for ephemeral rivers. When permanent, they are chalk streams.
- Brook.
- Burn is used in Scotland and North East England.
- Gill or ghyll is seen in the north of England and Kent and Surrey influenced by Old Norse. The variant "ghyll" is used in the Lake District and appears to have been an invention of William Wordsworth.
- Nant is used in Wales.
- Rivulet is a term encountered in Victorian era publications.
- Syke is used in the Scottish Lowlands and Cumbria for a seasonal stream.

=== Related terminology ===
Bar
A shoal that develops in a stream as sediment is deposited as the current slows or is impeded by wave action at the confluence.
Bifurcation
A fork into two or more streams.
Channel
A depression created by constant erosion that carries the stream's flow.
Confluence
The point at which the two streams merge. If the two tributaries are of approximately equal size, the confluence may be called a fork.
Drainage basin
(also known as a watershed in the United States) The area of land where water flows into a stream. A large drainage basin such as the Amazon River contains many smaller drainage basins.
Floodplain
Lands adjacent to the stream that are subject to flooding when a stream overflows its banks.
Headwaters or source
The part of a stream or river proximate to its source. The word is most commonly used in the plural where there is no single point source.
Knickpoint
The point on a stream's profile where a sudden change in stream gradient occurs.
Mouth
The point at which the stream discharges, possibly via an estuary or delta, into a static body of water such as a lake or ocean.
Pool
A segment where the water is deeper and slower moving.
Rapids
A very turbulent, fast-flowing, and of various depths, stretch of a stream or river.
Riffle
A segment of the flow which is shallower and turbulent but to lesser degree and without the vigor of a rapid.

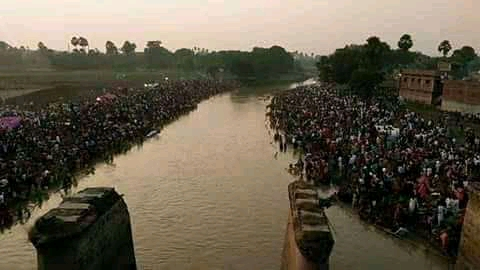
The Gangi River of Arrah, India

River
A large natural stream, which may be a waterway.
Run
A somewhat smoothly flowing segment of the stream.
Spring
The point at which a stream emerges from an underground course through unconsolidated sediments or through caves. A stream can, especially with caves, flow aboveground for part of its course, and underground for part of its course.
Stream bed
The bottom of a stream.
Stream corridor
Stream, its floodplains, and the transitional upland fringe.
Streamflow
The water moving through a stream channel.
Stream gauge
A site along the route of a stream or river, used for reference marking or water monitoring.
Thalweg
The river's longitudinal section, or the line joining the deepest point in the channel at each stage from source to mouth.
Watercourse
The channel followed by a stream (a flowing body of water) or the stream itself. In the UK, some aspects of criminal law, such as the Rivers (Prevention of Pollution) Act 1951, specify that a watercourse includes those rivers which are dry for part of the year. In some jurisdictions, owners of land over which the water flows may have the legal right to use or retain some or much of that water. This right may extend to estuaries, rivers, streams, anabranches and canals.
Waterfall or cascade
The fall of water where the stream goes over a sudden drop called a knickpoint; some knickpoints are formed by erosion when water flows over an especially resistant stratum, followed by one less so. The stream expends kinetic energy as it flows over the knickpoint.
Wetted perimeter
The line on which the stream's surface meets the channel walls.

== Sources ==
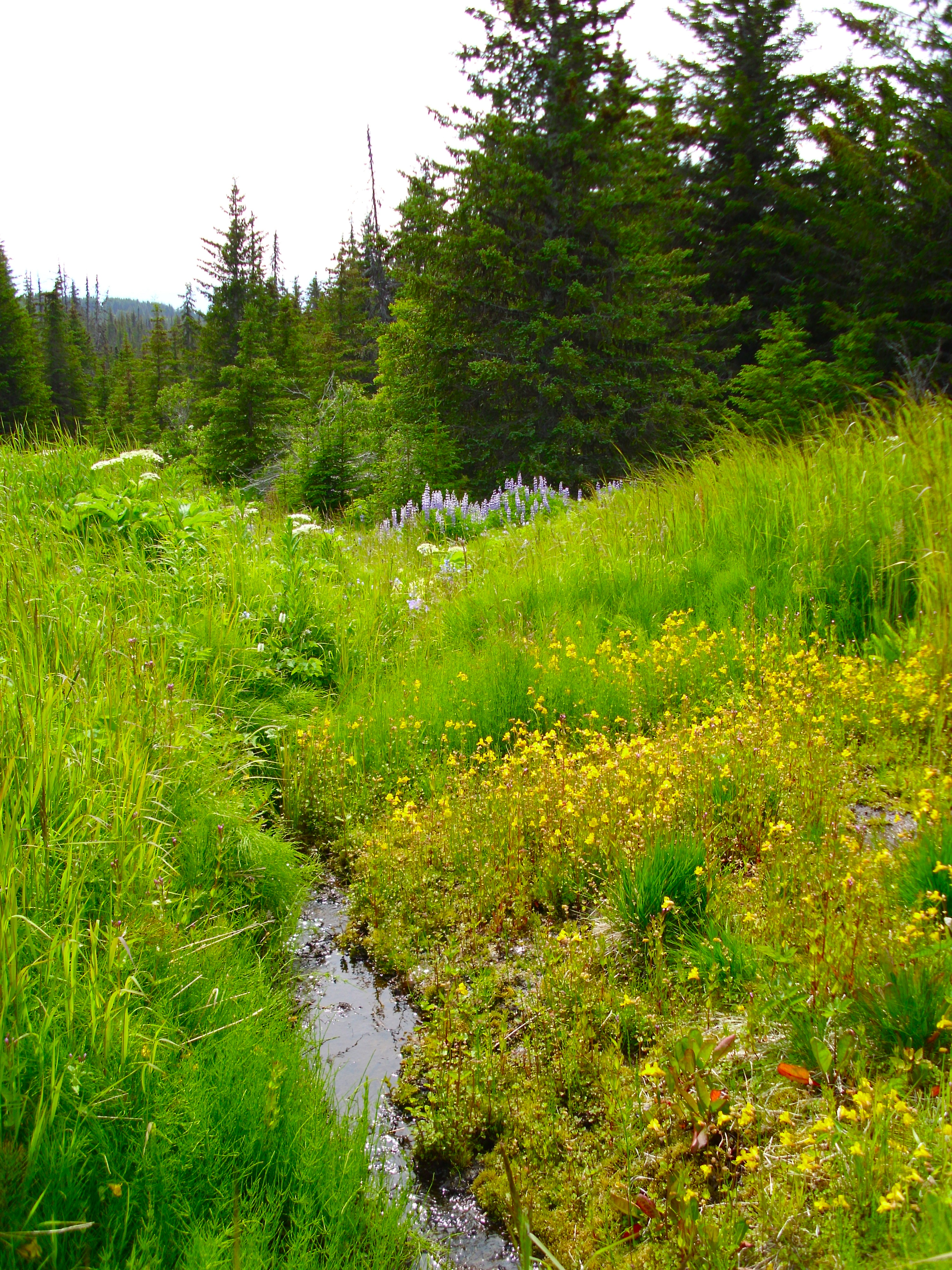
Small tributary stream, Diamond Ridge, Alaska

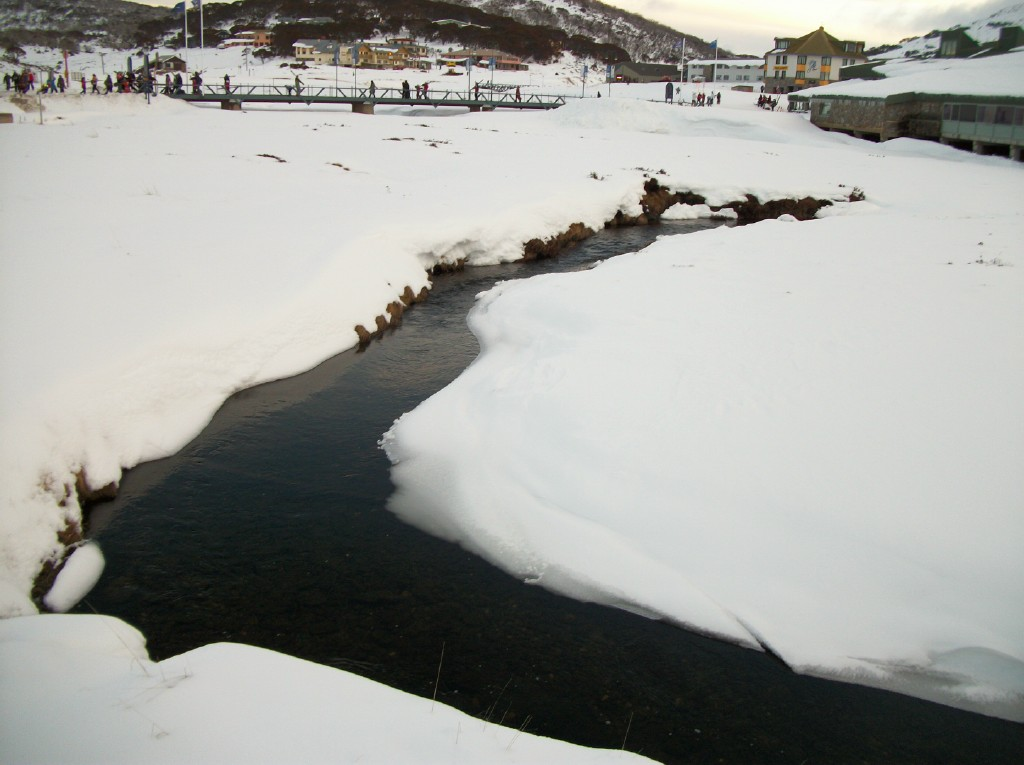
Creek in Perisher Ski Resort, Australia

A stream's source depends on the surrounding landscape and its function within larger river networks. While perennial and intermittent streams are typically supplied by smaller upstream waters and groundwater, headwater and ephemeral streams often derive most of their water from precipitation in the form of rain and snow. Most of this precipitated water re-enters the atmosphere by evaporation from soil and water bodies, or by the evapotranspiration of plants. Some of the water proceeds to sink into the earth by infiltration and becomes groundwater, much of which eventually enters streams. Some precipitated water is temporarily locked up in snow fields and glaciers, to be released later by evaporation or melting. The rest of the water flows off the land as runoff, the proportion of which varies according to many factors, such as wind, humidity, vegetation, rock types, and relief. This runoff starts as a thin film called sheet wash, combined with a network of tiny rills, together constituting sheet runoff; when this water is concentrated in a channel, a stream has its birth. Some creeks may start from ponds or lakes.

The streams typically derive most of their water from rain and snow precipitation. Most of this water re-enters the atmosphere either by evaporation from soil and water bodies, or by plant evapotranspiration. By infiltration some of the water sinks into the earth and becomes groundwater, much of which eventually enters streams. Most precipitated water is partially bottled up by evaporation or freezing in snow fields and glaciers. The majority of the water flows as a runoff from the ground; the proportion of this varies depending on several factors, such as climate, temperature, vegetation, types of rock, and relief. This runoff begins as a thin layer called sheet wash, combined with a network of tiny rills, which together form the sheet runoff; when this water is focused in a channel, a stream is born. Some rivers and streams may begin from lakes or ponds.

Freshwater's primary sources are precipitation and mountain snowmelt. However, rivers typically originate in the highlands, and are slowly created by the erosion of mountain snowmelt into lakes or rivers. Rivers usually flow from their source topographically, and erode as they pass until they reach the base stage of erosion.

Some scientists have proposed a critical support flow (CSD) concept and model to determine the hydrographic indicators of river sources in complex geographical areas.

The source of a river or stream (its point of origin) can consist of lakes, swamps, springs, or glaciers. A typical river has several tributaries; each of these may be made up of several other smaller tributaries, so that together this stream and all its tributaries are called a drainage network. Although each tributary has its own source, international practice is to take the source farthest from the river mouth as the source of the entire river system, from which the most extended length of the river measured as the starting point is taken as the length of the whole river system, and that furthest starting point is conventionally taken as the source of the whole river system. For example, the origin of the Nile River is the confluence of the White Nile and the Blue Nile, but the source of the whole river system is in its upper reaches. If there is no specific designation, "length of the Nile" refers to the "river length of the Nile system", rather than to the length of the Nile river from the point where it is formed by a confluence of tributaries. The Nile's source is often cited as Lake Victoria, but the lake has significant feeder rivers. The Kagera River, which flows into Lake Victoria near Bukoba's Tanzanian town, is the longest feeder, though sources do not agree on which is the Kagera's longest tributary and therefore the Nile's most remote source itself.

== Characteristics ==
=== Ranking ===
To qualify as a stream, a body of water must be either recurring or perennial. Recurring (intermittent) streams have water in the channel for at least part of the year. A stream of the first order is a stream which does not have any other recurring or perennial stream feeding into it. When two first-order streams come together, they form a second-order stream. When two second-order streams come together, they form a third-order stream. Streams of lower order joining a higher order stream do not change the order of the higher stream.

=== Gradient ===
The gradient of a stream is a critical factor in determining its character and is entirely determined by its base level of erosion. The base level of erosion is the point at which the stream either enters the ocean, a lake or pond, or enters a stretch in which it has a much lower gradient, and may be specifically applied to any particular stretch of a stream.

In geological terms, the stream will erode down through its bed to achieve the base level of erosion throughout its course. If this base level is low, then the stream will rapidly cut through underlying strata and have a steep gradient, and if the base level is relatively high, then the stream will form a flood plain and meander.

==== Profile ====
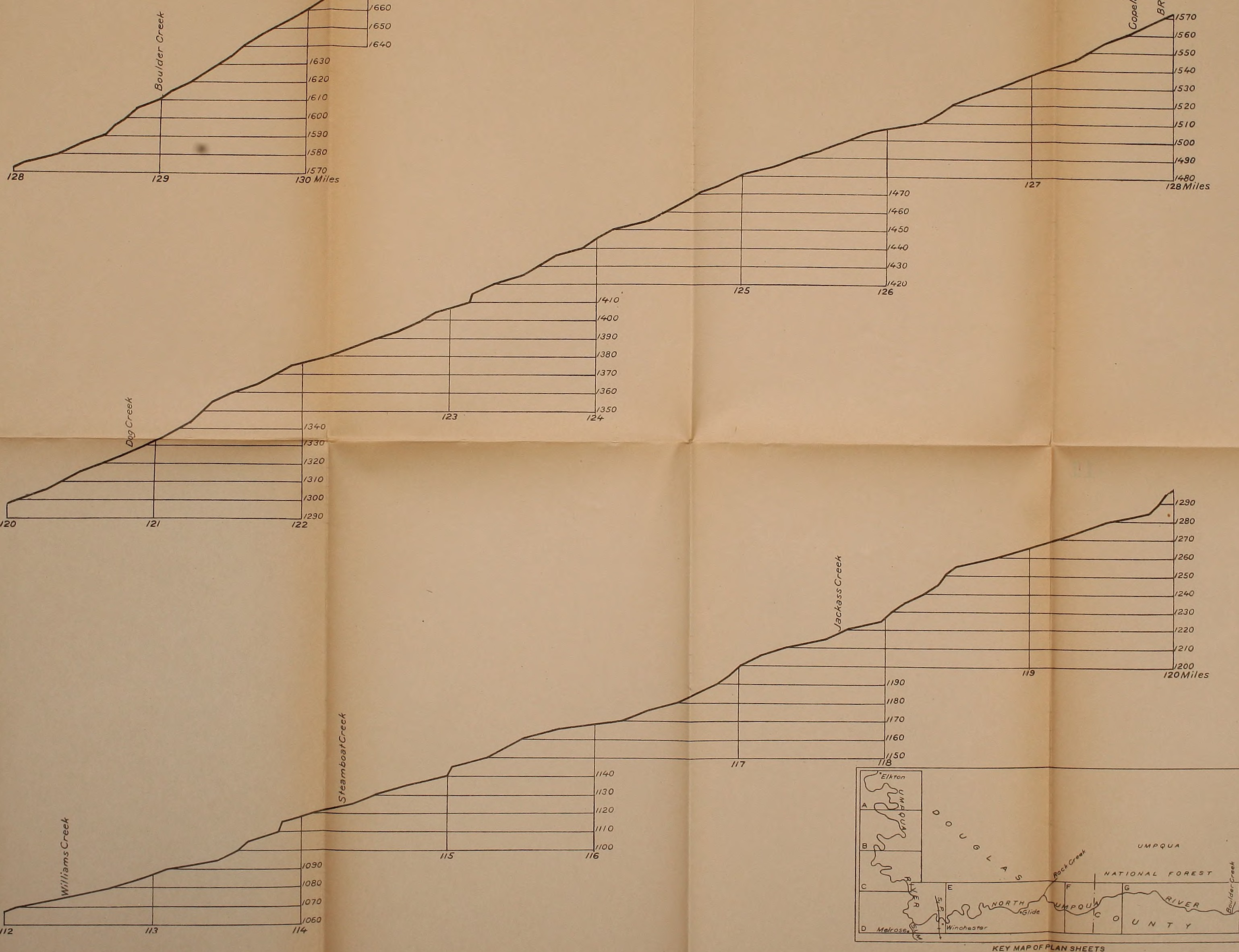
Profiles of the Umpqua River.

Typically, streams are said to have a particular elevation profile, also known as longitudinal profile or long profile. It begins at the source with steep gradients, no flood plain, and little shifting of channels, eventually evolving into streams with low gradients, wide flood plains, and extensive meanders. The initial stage is sometimes termed a "young" or "immature" stream, and the later state a "mature" or "old" stream. A stream cross profile is a cross section from bank to bank.

=== Meander ===
Meanders are looping changes of direction of a stream caused by the erosion and deposition of bank materials. These are typically serpentine in form. Typically, over time the meanders gradually migrate downstream. If some resistant material slows or stops the downstream movement of a meander, a stream may erode through the neck between two legs of a meander to become temporarily straighter, leaving behind an arc-shaped body of water termed an oxbow lake or bayou. A flood may also cause a meander to be cut through in this way.

=== Stream load ===
The stream load is defined as the solid matter carried by a stream. Streams can carry sediment, or alluvium. The amount of load it can carry (capacity) as well as the largest object it can carry (competence) are both dependent on the velocity of the stream.

== Classification ==
=== Perennial or not ===
Whites Creek a small perennial stream in the Ozarks of southern Missouri

A perennial stream is one which flows continuously all year. Some perennial streams may only have continuous flow in segments of its stream bed year round during years of normal rainfall. Blue-line streams are perennial streams and are marked on topographic maps with a solid blue line.

Perennial streams have one or more of these characteristics:

1. Direct observation or compelling evidence suggests that there is no interruption in the flow at ground.
2. The existence of one or more specific features of the perennial streams, including:
  - Riverbed forms, for example, riffles, pools, runs, gravel bars, other depositional characteristics, bed armor layer.
  - Riverbank erosion and/or polishment.
  - Indications of waterborne debris and sediment transport.
  - Defined river or stream bed and banks.
3. The catchment area exceeds .25 square miles (0.65 km^{2}).
4. USGS regression on the VHD data layer-oriented application on the probability of intermittent flow.
5. The existence of aquatic organisms that require uninterrupted circulation.
6. As shown by bank leakage, spring, or other indicators, grass-roots flow mainly supports groundwater recharge.
7. There are high channels of permeability, especially stratospheric, boundary conditions; while stratospheric groundwater also decreases on occasion.
8. Existence of native aquatic organisms which require undisturbed survival flow.
9. The surrounding topography exhibits features of being formed by fluvial processes.

Absence of such characteristics supports classifying a stream as intermittent, "showing interruptions in time or space".

==== Ephemeral stream ====
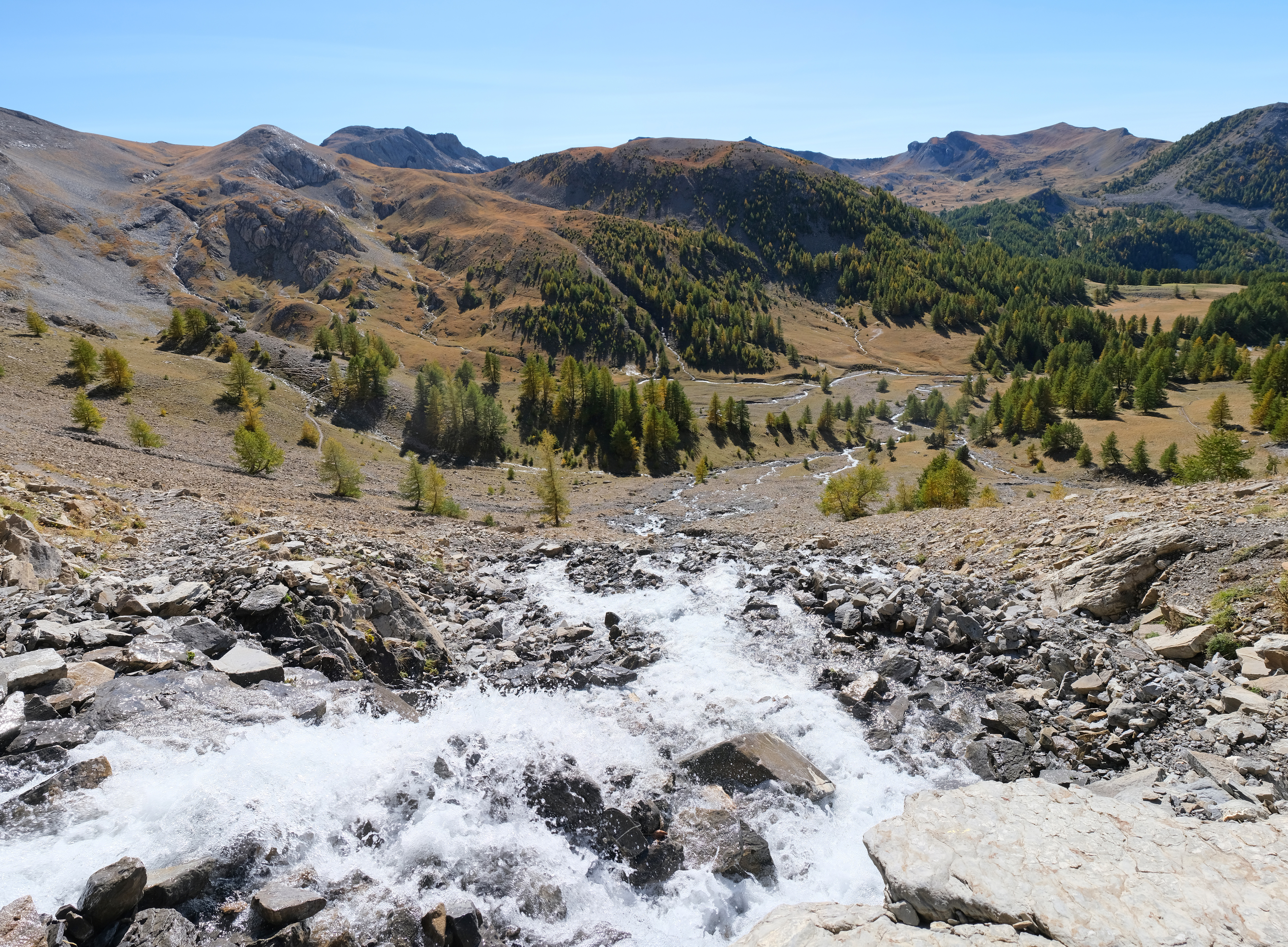
Ephemeral stream in Mont Pelat, Mercantour National Park.

Generally, streams that flow only during and immediately after precipitation are termed ephemeral. There is no clear demarcation between surface runoff and an ephemeral stream, and some ephemeral streams can be classed as intermittent—flow all but disappearing in the normal course of seasons but ample flow (backups) restoring stream presence — such circumstances are documented when stream beds have opened up a path into mines or other underground chambers.

According to official U.S. definitions, the channels of intermittent streams are well-defined, as opposed to ephemeral streams, which may or may not have a defined channel, and rely mainly on storm runoff, as their aquatic bed is above the water table. An ephemeral stream does not have the biological, hydrological, and physical characteristics of a continuous or intermittent stream. The same non-perennial channel might change characteristics from intermittent to ephemeral over its course.

==== Intermittent or seasonal stream ====
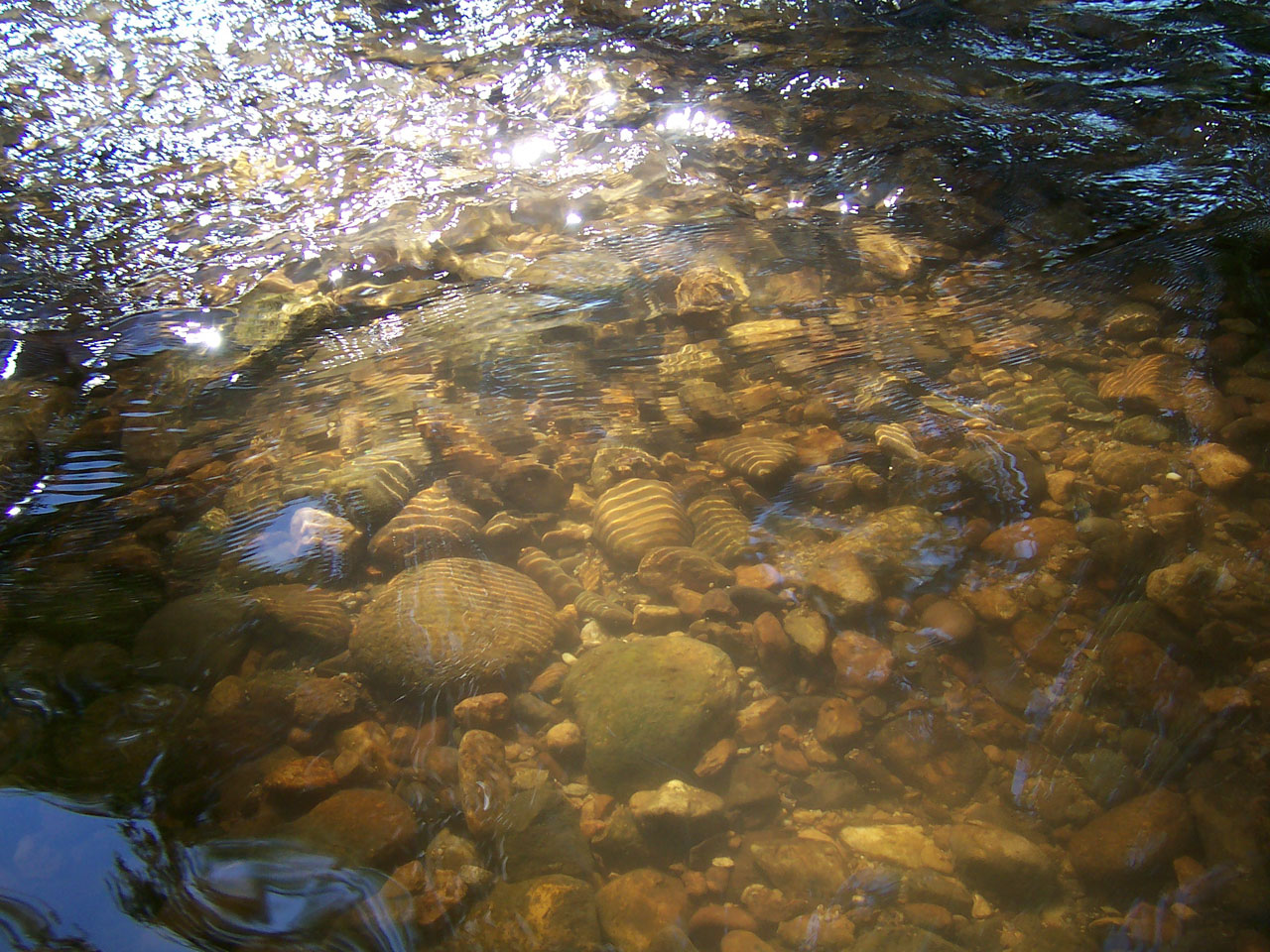
Australian creek, low in the dry season, carrying little water. The energetic flow of the stream had, in flood, moved finer sediment further downstream. There is a pool to lower right and a riffle to upper left of the photograph.

Washes can fill up quickly during rains, and there may be a sudden torrent of water after a thunderstorm begins upstream, such as during monsoonal conditions. In the United States, an intermittent or seasonal stream is one that only flows for part of the year and is marked on topographic maps with a line of blue dashes and dots. A wash, desert wash, or arroyo is normally a dry streambed in the deserts of the American Southwest, which flows after sufficient rainfall.

In Italy, an intermittent stream is termed a torrent (Italian: torrente). In full flood the stream may or may not be "torrential" in the dramatic sense of the word, but there will be one or more seasons in which the flow is reduced to a trickle or less. Typically torrents have Apennine rather than Alpine sources, and in the summer they are fed by little precipitation and no melting snow. In this case the maximum discharge will be during the spring and autumn.

An intermittent stream can also be called a winterbourne in Britain, a wadi in the Arabic-speaking world or torrente or rambla (this last one from Arabic origin) in Spain and Latin America. In Australia, an intermittent stream is usually called a creek and marked on topographic maps with a solid blue line.

=== Consequential or not ===
There are five generic classifications:

- Consequent streams are streams whose course is a direct consequence of the original slope of the surface upon which it developed, i.e., streams that follow slope of the land over which they originally formed.

- Subsequent streams are streams whose course has been determined by selective headward erosion along weak strata. These streams have generally developed after the original stream. Subsequent streams developed independently of the original relief of the land and generally follow paths determined by the weak rock belts.
- Resequent streams are streams whose course follows the original relief, but at a lower level than the original slope (e.g., flows down a course determined by the underlying strata in the same direction). These streams develop later and are generally a tributary to a subsequent stream.
- Obsequent streams are streams flowing in the opposite direction of the consequent drainage.
- Insequent streams have an almost random drainage often forming dendritic patterns. These are typically tributaries and have developed by a headward erosion on a horizontally stratified belt or on homogeneous rocks. These streams follow courses that apparently were not controlled by the original slope of the surface, its structure or the type of rock.

=== According to the water underneath ===
- Gaining: A stream or path to receive water from groundwater.
- Losing: A stream or reach of a stream which shows a net loss of water to groundwater or evaporation.
- Isolated: The water flow or channel shall not supply or remove water from the saturated region.
- Perched: refers to the loss or isolation flow separated from the groundwater in the air zone. Classification

== Indicators of a perennial stream ==
=== Benthic macroinvertebrates ===
"Macroinvertebrate" refers to easily seen invertebrates, larger than 0.5 mm, found in stream and river bottoms. Macroinvertebrates are larval stages of most aquatic insects and their presence is a good indicator that the stream is perennial. Larvae of caddisflies, mayflies, stoneflies, and damselflies require a continuous aquatic habitat until they reach maturity. Crayfish and other crustaceans, snails, bivalves (clams), and aquatic worms also indicate the stream is perennial. These require a persistent aquatic environment for survival.

=== Vertebrates ===
Fish and amphibians are secondary indicators in assessment of a perennial stream because some fish and amphibians can inhabit areas without persistent water regime. When assessing for fish, all available habitat should be assessed: pools, riffles, root clumps and other obstructions. Fish will seek cover if alerted to human presence, but should be easily observed in perennial streams. Amphibians also indicate a perennial stream and include tadpoles, frogs, salamanders, and newts. These amphibians can be found in stream channels, along stream banks, and even under rocks. Frogs and tadpoles usually inhabit shallow and slow moving waters near the sides of stream banks. Frogs will typically jump into water when alerted to human presence.

=== Geological indicators ===
Well defined river beds composed of riffles, pools, runs, gravel bars, a bed armor layer, and other depositional features, plus well defined banks due to bank erosion, are good identifiers when assessing for perennial streams. Particle size will help identify a perennial stream. Perennial streams cut through the soil profile, which removes fine and small particles. By assessing areas for relatively coarse material left behind in the stream bed and finer sediments along the side of the stream or within the floodplain will be a good indicator of persistent water regime.

=== Hydrological indicators ===
A perennial stream can be identified 48 hours after a storm. Direct storm runoff usually has ceased at this point. If a stream is still flowing and contributing inflow is not observed above the channel, the observed water is likely baseflow. Another perennial stream indication is an abundance of red rust material in a slow-moving wetted channel or stagnant area. This is evidence that iron-oxidizing bacteria are present, indicating persistent expression of oxygen-depleted ground water. In a forested area, leaf and needle litter in the stream channel is an additional indicator. Accumulation of leaf litter does not occur in perennial streams since such material is continuously flushed. In the adjacent overbank of a perennial stream, fine sediment may cling to riparian plant stems and tree trunks. Organic debris drift lines or piles may be found within the active overbank area after recent high flow.

== Importance ==
Streams, headwaters, and streams flowing only part of the year provide benefits upstream and downstream. They defend against floods, remove contaminants, recycle nutrients that are potentially dangerous as well as provide food and habitat for many forms of fish. It also helps in:

1. Clean drinking water
2. Flood and erosion protection
3. Groundwater recharge
4. Pollution reduction
5. Wildlife habitat
6. Economic importance in fishing, hunting, manufacturing and agriculture.

== Drainage basins ==
The extent of land basin drained by a stream is termed its drainage basin (also known in North America as the watershed and, in British English, as a catchment). A basin may also be composed of smaller basins. For instance, the Continental Divide in North America divides the mainly easterly-draining Atlantic Ocean and Arctic Ocean basins from the largely westerly-flowing Pacific Ocean basin. The Atlantic Ocean basin, however, may be further subdivided into the Atlantic Ocean and Gulf of Mexico drainages. (This delineation is termed the Eastern Continental Divide.) Similarly, the Gulf of Mexico basin may be divided into the Mississippi River basin and several smaller basins, such as the Tombigbee River basin. Continuing in this vein, a component of the Mississippi River basin is the Ohio River basin, which in turn includes the Kentucky River basin, and so forth.

== Crossings ==
Stream crossings are where streams are crossed by roads, pipelines, railways, or any other thing which might restrict the flow of the stream in ordinary or flood conditions. Any structure over or in a stream which results in limitations on the movement of fish or other ecological elements may be an issue.

== See also ==
- Aqueduct (water supply)
- Environmental flow
- Fluvial sediment processes
- Head cut
- Playfair's Law
- River ecosystem
- Rock-cut basin
- Tidal stream generator
- Winterbourne, a stream that flows only in winter
