= Fox Creek (Bryant Creek tributary) =

Stream in Douglas County, Missouri, United States

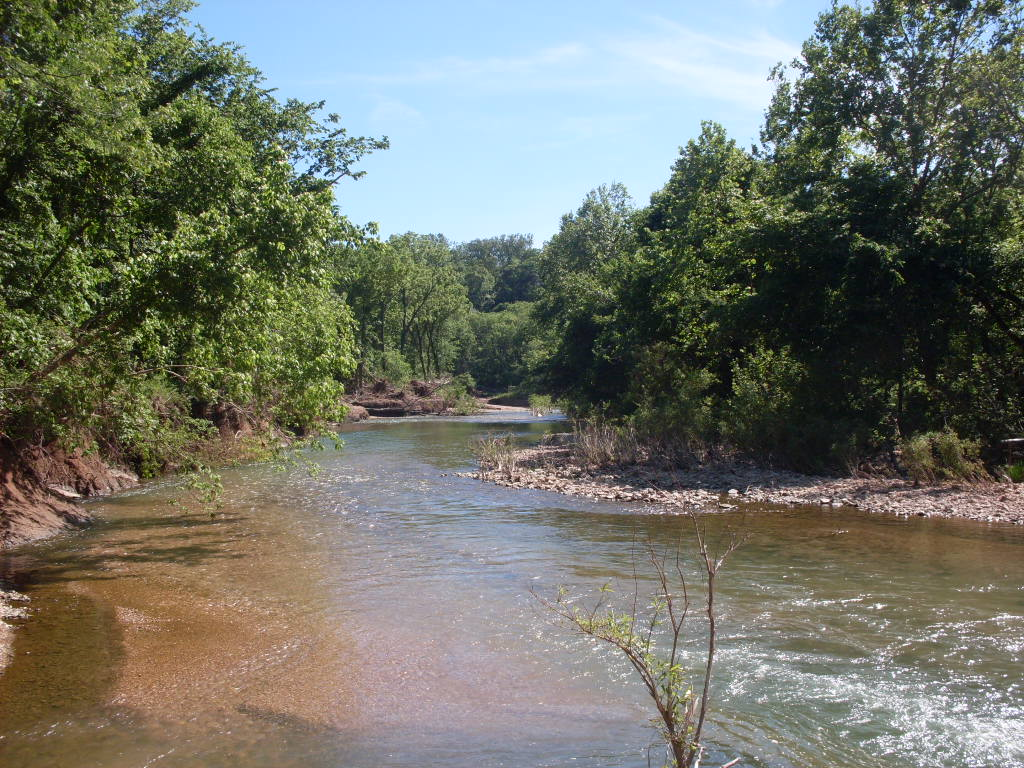
- Fox Creek looking south from county road bridge at Champion, Missouri

Location
- Country: United States
- State: Missouri
- Region: Douglas County and Wright County

Physical characteristics
- Source
  - coordinates: 37°05′24″N 92°23′58″W
  - elevation: 1,400 ft (430 m)
- Mouth
  - coordinates: 36°49′34″N 92°23′13″W
  - elevation: 722 ft (220 m)

Fox Creek is a south flowing stream in Douglas and Wright counties in Missouri, United States, that is a tributary of Bryant Creek.

== Description ==
The creek's headwaters is about three quarters of a mile east of Missouri Route C just southeast of the town of Norwood in southern Wright County. The stream flows in a meandering southerly direction past Denlow on Missouri Route 76; east of Champion; just west of Gentryville on Missouri Route 14; and Bertha to its confluence with Bryant Creek just south of Bertha. The elevation of the confluence is 722 ft (220 m).

== See also ==
- List of rivers in Missouri
