= Bryant Creek =

Stream in the American state of Missouri

Location
- Country: United States
- State: Missouri
- Region: Douglas County, Wright County and Ozark County

Physical characteristics
- Source
  - coordinates: 37°05′56″N 92°39′59″W
  - elevation: 1,650 ft (500 m)
- Mouth
  - coordinates: 36°35′46″N 92°17′19″W
  - elevation: 558 ft (170 m)
- Discharge
  - location: Tecumseh
  - average: 530 cu ft/s (15 m^{3}/s)

Basin features
- Tributaries
  - left: Dry Creek, Fox Creek, Brush Creek
  - right: Bill Macks Creek, Hunter Creek, Rippee Creek, Spring Creek, Pine Creek

Bryant Creek (also known as Bryant River) is a stream in the Ozarks region of Missouri, United States. Bryant Creek has headwaters just west of Lead Hill and southeast Cedar Gap in southwestern Wright County and flows in a southeasterly direction through Douglas County east of Ava. It joins the North Fork River in Ozark County just north of Tecumseh and within the waters of Norfork Lake. Its tributaries include Bill Macks Creek, Hunter Creek, Rippee Creek, Fox Creek, Brush Creek, Spring Creek and Pine Creek.

Bryant Creek is named after a pioneer citizen who arrived in the area in the 1830s.

== See also ==
- List of rivers of Missouri
