= Elkhorn Creek (McDonald County, Missouri) =

Stream in the U.S. state of Missouri

Elkhorn Creek is a stream in McDonald County in the U.S. state of Missouri. It is a tributary of Indian Creek.

The stream headwaters arise at 36°42′27″N 94°12′07″W just east of Missouri Route 76 south of Longview. It flows southwest past Bethpage and then west-northwest to its confluence with Indian Creek south of McNatt at 36°43′29″N 94°19′19″W.

Some say Elkhorn Creek was named for elk in the area, while others believe the name is a transfer from a creek of the same name in Letcher County, Kentucky.

== See also ==
- List of rivers of Missouri
