= Lanagan, Missouri =

City in McDonald County, Missouri, United States

- City
- Location in McDonald County and the state of Missouri
- Coordinates: 36°36′22″N 94°27′06″W
- Country: United States
- State: Missouri
- County: McDonald

Area
  - Total: 0.94 sq mi (2.44 km^{2})
  - Land: 0.94 sq mi (2.44 km^{2})
  - Water: 0 sq mi (0.00 km^{2})
- Elevation: 886 ft (270 m)

Population (2020)
  - Total: 373
  - Density: 396.7/sq mi (153.18/km^{2})
- Time zone: UTC-6 (Central (CST))
  - Summer (DST): UTC-5 (CDT)
- ZIP code: 64847
- Area code: 417
- FIPS code: 29-40592
- GNIS feature ID: 2396706
- Website: cityoflanagan.com

Lanagan is a city on Indian Creek in McDonald County, Missouri, United States. It is near Truitt's Cave. The population was 373 at the 2020 census, down from 419 in 2010.

== History ==
A post office called Lanagan has been in operation since 1891. According to tradition, the community was named after a railroad employee.

== Geography ==
Lanagan is located in west-central McDonald County. Missouri Route 59 passes through the town as Main Street, leading north 3 miles (5 km) to Anderson and south 6 miles (10 km) to Noel. Pineville, the county seat, is 5 miles (8 km) to the east via county roads.

According to the U.S. Census Bureau, Lanagan has a total area of 0.94 square miles (2.43 km^{2}), all of it recorded as land. Indian Creek passes through the city, with the bulk of the city on the west side of the creek. Indian Creek is a south-flowing tributary of the Elk River and part of the Neosho River watershed.

== Demographics ==
Historical population
Census	Pop.	Note	%±
1930	347		—
1940	340		−2.0%
1950	368		8.2%
1960	357		−3.0%
1970	374		4.8%
1980	440		17.6%
1990	501		13.9%
2000	411		−18.0%
2010	419		1.9%
2020	373		−11.0%
U.S. Decennial Census

=== 2010 census ===
As of the census of 2010, there were 419 people, 171 households, and 105 families living in the city. The population density was 445.7 inhabitants per square mile (172.1/km^{2}). There were 211 housing units at an average density of 224.5 per square mile (86.7/km^{2}). The racial makeup of the city was 82.3% White, 0.5% African American, 4.8% Native American, 3.8% from other races, and 8.6% from two or more races. Hispanic or Latino of any race were 10.7% of the population.

There were 171 households, of which 33.9% had children under the age of 18 living with them, 40.4% were married couples living together, 14.0% had a female householder with no husband present, 7.0% had a male householder with no wife present, and 38.6% were non-families. 33.3% of all households were made up of individuals, and 16.4% had someone living alone who was 65 years of age or older. The average household size was 2.45 and the average family size was 3.14.

The median age in the city was 36.3 years. 28.9% of residents were under the age of 18; 6.6% were between the ages of 18 and 24; 24.3% were from 25 to 44; 26.3% were from 45 to 64; and 13.8% were 65 years of age or older. The gender makeup of the city was 51.1% male and 48.9% female.

=== 2000 census ===
As of the census of 2000, there were 411 people, 170 households, and 106 families living in the town. The population density was 426.1 inhabitants per square mile (164.5/km^{2}). There were 222 housing units at an average density of 230.1 per square mile (88.8/km^{2}). The racial makeup of the town was 88.32% White, 0.24% African American, 4.87% Native American, 0.24% Asian, 1.95% from other races, and 4.38% from two or more races. Hispanic or Latino of any race were 8.27% of the population.

There were 170 households, out of which 27.1% had children under the age of 18 living with them, 48.8% were married couples living together, 8.8% had a female householder with no husband present, and 37.6% were non-families. 34.7% of all households were made up of individuals, and 21.8% had someone living alone who was 65 years of age or older. The average household size was 2.42 and the average family size was 3.17.

25.8% of Lanagan's people were under the age of 18, 12.9% were from 18 to 24, 20.2% from 25 to 44, 25.1% from 45 to 64, and 16.1% were 65 years of age or older. The median age was 37 years. For every 100 females, there were 96.7 males. For every 100 females age 18 and over, there were 94.3 males.

The median income for a household in the town was $20,125, and the median income for a family was $27,188. Males had a median income of $17,143 versus $18,250 for females. The per capita income for the town was $9,776. About 22.4% of families and 34.9% of the population were below the poverty line, including 52.0% of those under age 18 and 32.8% of those age 65 or over.

== Economy ==
Lanagan’s economy has traditionally relied on agriculture, small-scale manufacturing, and retail businesses. In recent years, tourism has grown due to its proximity to natural attractions like Truitt's Cave. However, like many small towns, Lanagan faces economic challenges, with a median household income of $40,625 and a significant portion (19.9%) of the population living below the poverty line.

== Education ==
It is in the McDonald County R-I School District.

== See also ==
- List of cities in Missouri
