= Jane, Missouri =

Village in McDonald County, Missouri, United States

- Village
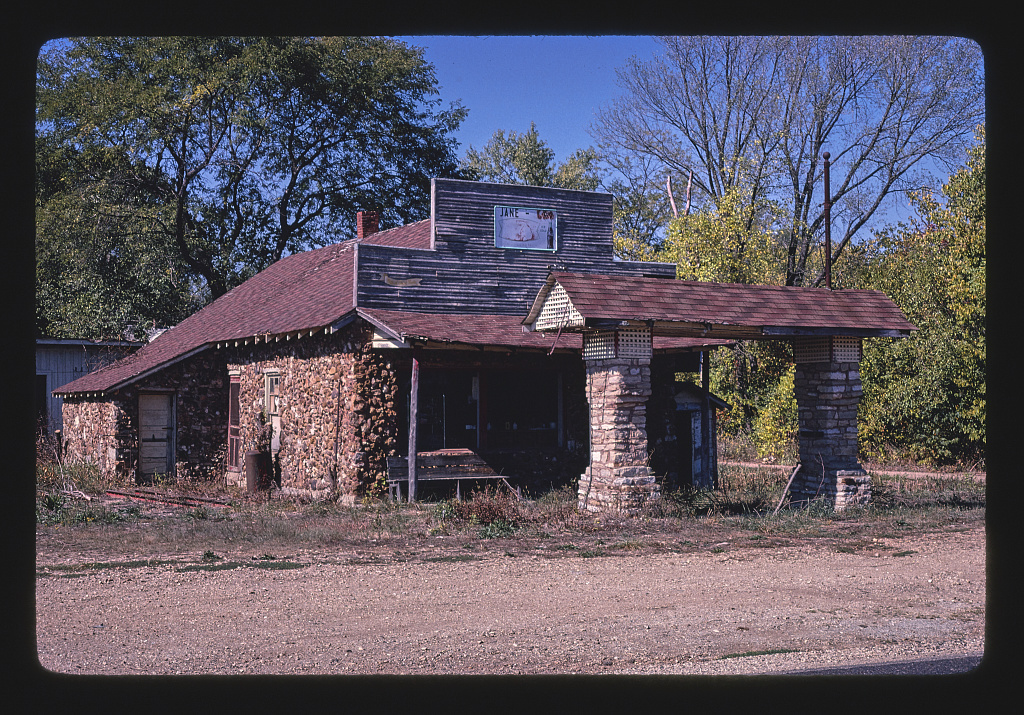
- The former Jane Gas & Grocery (now the Jane Store) along Route 90 in Jane, 1980

- Location within Missouri Location within the United States
- Coordinates: 36°32′25″N 94°18′28″W
- Country: United States
- State: Missouri
- County: McDonald
- Incorporation: April 13, 2005

Area
  - Total: 2.97 sq mi (7.70 km^{2})
  - Land: 2.97 sq mi (7.70 km^{2})
  - Water: 0 sq mi (0.00 km^{2})
- Elevation: 1,007 ft (307 m)

Population (2020)
  - Total: 359
  - Density: 120.7/sq mi (46.59/km^{2})
- Time zone: UTC-6 (Central (CST))
  - Summer (DST): UTC-5 (CDT)
- ZIP code: 64856
- Area code: 417
- FIPS code: 29-36422
- GNIS feature ID: 2741106
- Website: villageofjane.com

Jane is a village on Little Sugar Creek in McDonald County, Missouri, United States. As of the 2020 census it had a population of 359, up from 309 in 2010.

== History ==
Jane was an unincorporated community for many years, but incorporated in 2005 after a petition drive of local residents, in order to block possible annexation by Pineville, 6 miles (10 km) to the northwest. Pineville had greatly expanded its city limits with the opening of the widened U.S. Route 71 (US 71), later commissioned as Interstate 49, to its west. In 2006, the village of Jane expanded southward from its original boundaries to include a large section of US 71, at the behest of the McDonald County planning commission. It now extends south to within a one-half of a mile (0.80 km) of the Arkansas state line, abutting the unincorporated community of Caverna, and running primarily along the US 71 corridor.

Jane previously had the ZIP Code of 64846 but now shares the ZIP Code of 64856 with Pineville, the county seat of McDonald County. Rural delivery is managed from the post office in Anderson.

== Geography ==
Jane is in southern McDonald County on Missouri Route 90 at its intersection with US 71. The original settlement is approximately 1 mile (1.6 km) east on an older alignment of US 71.

According to the U.S. Census Bureau, the village of Jane has an area of 2.98 square miles (7.7 km^{2}), all land. The village is drained by tributaries of Little Sugar Creek, which flows northwest to form the Elk River at Pineville.

== Demographics ==
Historical population
Census	Pop.	Note	%±
2010	309		—
2020	359		16.2%
U.S. Decennial Census

=== 2015 American Community Survey ===
As of the 2015 American Community Survey, the racial makeup of the city was:
95.7% White
1.3% American Indian and Alaska Native
0.4% Some other race
2.6% Two or more races
35.4% Hispanic or Latino (of any race)

== Services ==
Municipal services include a volunteer fire department, and rural water and sewer service that is tied via a lift-pump system with the sewage treatment plant in Bella Vista. Arkansas. Funding for the sewer system was provided by a municipal bond voted on by the residents in 2008, with the payback coming directly from those served. Electric power for the area is supplied by New-Mac Electric Company, a cooperative based in Neosho.

Law enforcement and 911 services are provided by the McDonald County Sheriff's Office, located in Pineville.

== Education ==
It is in the McDonald County R-I School District. White Rock Elementary School, part of McDonald County R-I School District, is located near the village center.

== Economy ==
The sole Walmart store in McDonald County is just outside the southern village limits of Jane. A satellite of the McDonald County Sheriff's Office is located within the store. Walmart operates a large data center nicknamed Area 71, four miles (6.4 km) south of Jane and just north of the Arkansas border. Walmart's corporate headquarters are in Bentonville, Arkansas, about fourteen miles (23 km) south of Jane.

== See also ==
- List of cities in Missouri
