= Indian Creek (Elk River tributary) =

Stream in McDonald and Newton counties in Missouri, United States

Indian Creek is a stream in Newton and McDonald counties in southwest Missouri, United States. It is a tributary of the Elk River.

== Description ==
The headwaters are in Newton County at 36°47′41″N 94°13′55″W and the confluence with Elk River is at 36°34′53″N 94°27′00″W. The stream starts at the confluence of North and South Indian creeks just east of Boulder City and flows southwest into McDonald County. It flows past the communities of McNatt and Erie and under U. S. Route 71 and Missouri Route 76 just southeast of Anderson. The stream turns south and flows parallel to Missouri Route 59 past Lanagan to its confluence with the Elk River about midway between Pineville and Noel. At Lanagan, the creek has a mean annual discharge of 231 cubic feet per second.

Indian Creek was named for the fact American Indians had settled near its course.

== See also ==
- List of rivers of Missouri
