= Jesse James (1939 film) =

1939 film by Henry King

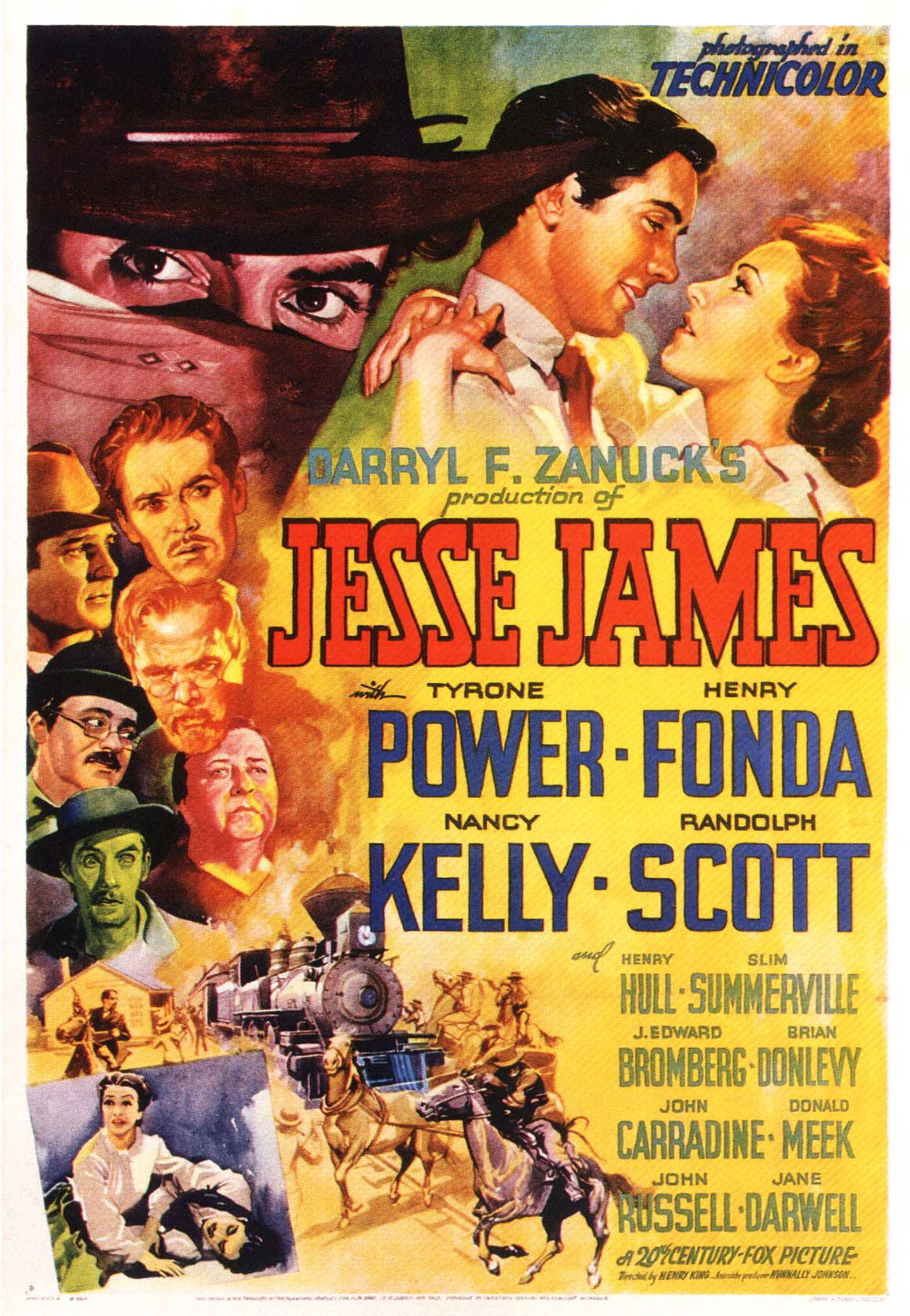
- Jesse James movie poster
- Directed by: Henry King
- Screenplay by: Nunnally Johnson
- Produced by: Nunnally Johnson (associate producer)
- Starring: Tyrone Power; Henry Fonda; Nancy Kelly; Randolph Scott; Henry Hull; Slim Summerville; J. Edward Bromberg; Brian Donlevy; John Carradine; Donald Meek; John Russell; Jane Darwell
- Cinematography: George Barnes; W. H. Greene
- Edited by: Barbara Mc Lean
- Music by: Louis Silvers (musical direction)
- Production company: 20th Century Fox
- Distributed by: Twentieth Century-Fox
- Release date: January 14, 1939
- Running time: 106 minutes
- Country: United States
- Language: English
- Budget: $1.6 million
- Box office: $2.335 million (U.S. and Canada rentals)

Jesse James is a 1939 American Western film directed by Henry King and starring Tyrone Power, Henry Fonda, Nancy Kelly, and Randolph Scott. Written by Nunnally Johnson, the film is loosely based on the life of Jesse James, the outlaw from whom the film derives its name. The supporting cast includes Henry Hull, John Carradine, Brian Donlevy, Jane Darwell, and Lon Chaney Jr.

The American Humane Association began to oversee film production's care of animals shortly after this film's release, in response to outcry over a scene in which a horse died after it was driven off a cliff.

The film has been described by the British Channel 4 website as being "notorious for its historical inaccuracy".

== Plot ==
A railroad representative named Barshee forces farmers to give up land a railroad is going to go through, giving them $1 per acre (much less than fair price) for it. When they come to Jesse's home, Barshee is told by Jesse that his mother Mrs Samuels is the farm's owner.

Barshee repeatedly tries to force her into selling, until her other son Frank James gets involved. Frank fights and easily beats Barshee, but Jesse shoots Barshee in the hand, in self-defense. When arrest warrants are issued for Frank and Jesse, Major A. Rufus Cobb, an editor in nearby Liberty, Missouri, and uncle of Zerelda (Zee) Cobb, Jesse's lover, quickly comes to tell them to leave.

Frank and Jesse learn that Barshee is responsible for the death of their mother and Jesse kills him in revenge. This begins Frank and Jesse's career as outlaws. They are pursued relentlessly by the unscrupulous railway boss, McCoy. Three years later, with a $5,000 reward on his head, Jesse marries Zee and turns himself in, at her insistence, having been promised a light sentence by Marshall Will Wright. But McCoy manages to manipulate the situation through his connections, by having the judge dismissed pre-trial, and installing a new judge, who is likely to favour McCoy's recommendation of imposing the death penalty for Jesse.

Frank breaks Jesse out of jail, and the James gang continue their life of crime. Eventually Zee leaves him, taking their son Jesse Jr. with her. Years later, following an unsuccessful robbery, a wounded Jesse returns home and Zee joins him in the belief that they will escape to California. Meanwhile, Bob Ford, an old member of the James gang, together with his brother Charlie Ford, contact Jesse, claiming that Frank sent them to ask Jesse to participate in their next robbery. They assert that the job will earn them all a large sum of money for very little risk. Jesse nevertheless refuses the Ford brothers' offer, and the brothers exit the house. However, sensing an opportunity to claim the generous reward for Jesse's death, Bob Ford sneaks back inside, and shoots Jesse in the back, thereby killing him.

== Cast ==
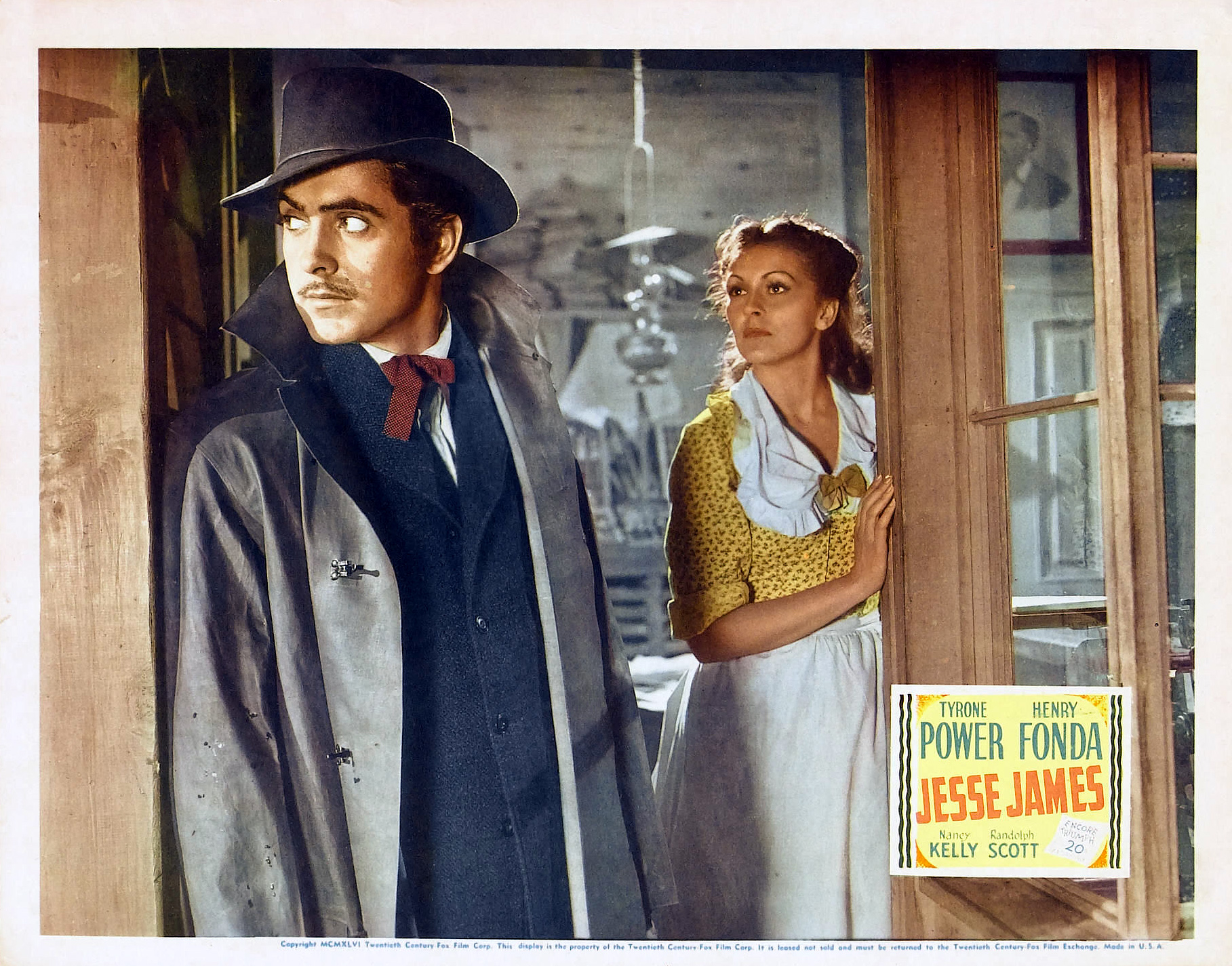
Tyrone Power and Nancy Kelly

- Tyrone Power as Jesse James
- Henry Fonda as Frank James
- Nancy Kelly as Zerelda (Zee)
- Randolph Scott as Will Wright
- Henry Hull as Major Rufus Cobb
- Slim Summerville as Jailer
- J. Edward Bromberg as Mr. Runyan
- Brian Donlevy as Barshee
- John Carradine as Bob Ford
- Donald Meek as McCoy
- John Russell as Jesse James, Jr.
- Jane Darwell as Mrs. Samuels
- Charles Tannen as Charles Ford
- Claire Du Brey as Mrs. Bob Ford
- Willard Robertson as Clarke
- Harold Goodwin as Bill
- Ernest Whitman as Pinkie
- Eddy Waller as Deputy
- Paul Burns as Hank
- Spencer Charters as Minister
- Arthur Aylesworth as Tom Colson
- Charles Middleton as Doctor
- Charles Halton as Heywood
- George Chandler as Roy
- Harry Tyler as Farmer
- Virginia Brissac as Boy's Mother
- Ed Le Saint as Judge Rankin
- John Elliott as Judge Mathews
- Erville Alderson as Old Marshall
- George Breakston as Farmer Boy
- Lon Chaney, Jr. as One of James Gang

== Production ==
Much of the filming for Jesse James took place around the town of Pineville in McDonald County, Missouri, because at the time the town and surrounding area looked much as it would have in the 1880s and 1890s. The town's historic Old McDonald County Courthouse, a National Register of Historic Places site, was featured in the film serving as a stand-in for the Liberty, Missouri, courthouse. Pineville still celebrates Jesse James Days annually in homage to the film and the movie stars who descended on the small town to make it. In their off time from filming, the films' stars and crew, including Tyrone Power, Henry Fonda, and Randolph Scott, would seek relaxation at the Shadow Lake resort in Noel, Missouri, on the shores of the Elk River (Oklahoma).

After its release the film would gain a measure of misplaced notoriety for a scene in which a horse appears to fall to its death down a rocky slope toward the end of the film. This scene was one of many cited by the American Humane Association against Hollywood's abuse of animals, and led to the association's monitoring of filmmaking. However, according to Leonard Mosley's biography Zanuck: The Rise and Fall of Hollywood's Last Tycoon, none of "the horses [had] been injured. Under Zanuck's direction, a short distance down the cliff, on a conveniently broad platform, the unit roper had arranged a soft landing for the horses."

The most difficult riding stunts were performed for high fees by Cliff Lyons, who doubled both costars.

== Reception ==
Jesse James was the third highest-grossing film of the year, behind Gone with the Wind and Mr. Smith Goes to Washington. A sequel, The Return of Frank James, directed by Fritz Lang with Henry Fonda reprising his role as Frank James along with other actors playing the same characters as they had in Jesse James, was released in 1940.

The film was on continuous release in the United States for more than 15 years. The film was reissued in March 1946 and was released for a fourth time in July 1951. By May 1954, it had played over 52,000 bookings in the United States and Canada.

A remake was directed by Nicholas Ray in 1957, The True Story of Jesse James.

== Animal cruelty ==
The film gained a measure of notoriety for a scene in which a horse falls down a rocky slope, apparently to its death, toward the end of the film. This scene was one of many cited by the American Humane Association against Hollywood's abuse of animals, and led to the association's monitoring of filmmaking. According to Leonard Mosley's 1985 biography Zanuck: The Rise and Fall of Hollywood's Last Tycoon, none of "the horses [had] been injured." But according to Time in 1939, Darryl Zanuck confirmed "in print and letters" the death of the horse was an "accident." According to most sources, the horse died, having to be put down after the 70 foot fall.

== See also ==
- List of American films of 1939
