= Ginger Blue, Missouri =

- Village
- Location within Missouri Location within the United States
- Coordinates: 36°35′24″N 94°27′35″W
- Country: United States
- State: Missouri
- County: McDonald
- Incorporation: January 21, 1965

Area
  - Total: 0.26 sq mi (0.68 km^{2})
  - Land: 0.26 sq mi (0.68 km^{2})
  - Water: 0 sq mi (0.00 km^{2})
- Elevation: 843 ft (257 m)

Population (2020)
  - Total: 37
  - Density: 141.9/sq mi (54.78/km^{2})
- Time zone: UTC-6 (Central (CST))
  - Summer (DST): UTC-5 (CDT)
- ZIP code: 64854 (Noel)
- Area code: 417
- FIPS code: 29-27100
- GNIS feature ID: 2398965

Ginger Blue is an incorporated village in McDonald County, Missouri, United States. The population was 37 at the 2020 census, down from 61 in 2010.

== Geography ==
Ginger Blue is in southwestern McDonald County on Missouri Route 59, which leads 2 miles (3 km) north to Lanagan and 4 miles (6 km) south to Noel. It is on the northwest side of a sharp meander in the Elk River.

According to the U.S. Census Bureau, the village has a total area of 0.26 square miles (0.67 km^{2}), including the Elk River where it curves through the southern part of the village. Via the Elk River, the village is within the Neosho River watershed, a tributary of the Arkansas River.

== Demographics ==
Historical population
Census	Pop.	Note	%±
2010	61		—
2020	37		−39.3%
U.S. Decennial Census

=== 2010 census ===
As of the census of 2010, there were 61 people, 28 households, and 17 families residing in the village. The population density was 234.6 inhabitants per square mile (90.6/km^{2}). There were 40 housing units at an average density of 153.8 per square mile (59.4/km^{2}). The racial makeup of the village was 88.5% White, 1.6% African American, 1.6% Pacific Islander, 6.6% from other races, and 1.6% from two or more races. Hispanic or Latino of any race were 6.6% of the population.

There were 28 households, of which 28.6% had children under the age of 18 living with them, 39.3% were married couples living together, 17.9% had a female householder with no husband present, 3.6% had a male householder with no wife present, and 39.3% were non-families. 35.7% of all households were made up of individuals, and 7.2% had someone living alone who was 65 years of age or older. The average household size was 2.18 and the average family size was 2.71.

The median age in the village was 40.6 years. 16.4% of residents were under the age of 18; 13.1% were between the ages of 18 and 24; 29.4% were from 25 to 44; 36% were from 45 to 64; and 4.9% were 65 years of age or older. The gender makeup of the village was 49.2% male and 50.8% female.

== Education ==
It is in the McDonald County R-I School District.
