= Patterson Creek (Buffalo Creek tributary) =

Stream in the U.S. state of Missouri

Patterson Creek is a stream in McDonald County, Missouri and Delaware County, Oklahoma in the United States. It is a tributary of Buffalo Creek in eastern Oklahoma.

The stream begins at the confluence of the small North Fork and South Fork streams about three miles west of Anderson (at 36°39′35″N 94°30′29″W). The stream flows due west past the community of Coy parallel to and north of Missouri Route 76 passing under the route 76 Missouri Route 43 concurrency about two miles east of Tiff City. The stream turns to the southwest for about two miles before reaching its confluence with Buffalo Creek just west of the Missouri-Oklahoma border about 1.5 miles south of Tiff City (at 36°38′54″N 94°37′07″W).

Patterson Creek has the name of John Patterson, a pioneer citizen.

== See also ==
- List of rivers of Missouri
- List of rivers of Oklahoma
