= Old McDonald County Courthouse =

- U.S. National Register of Historic Places
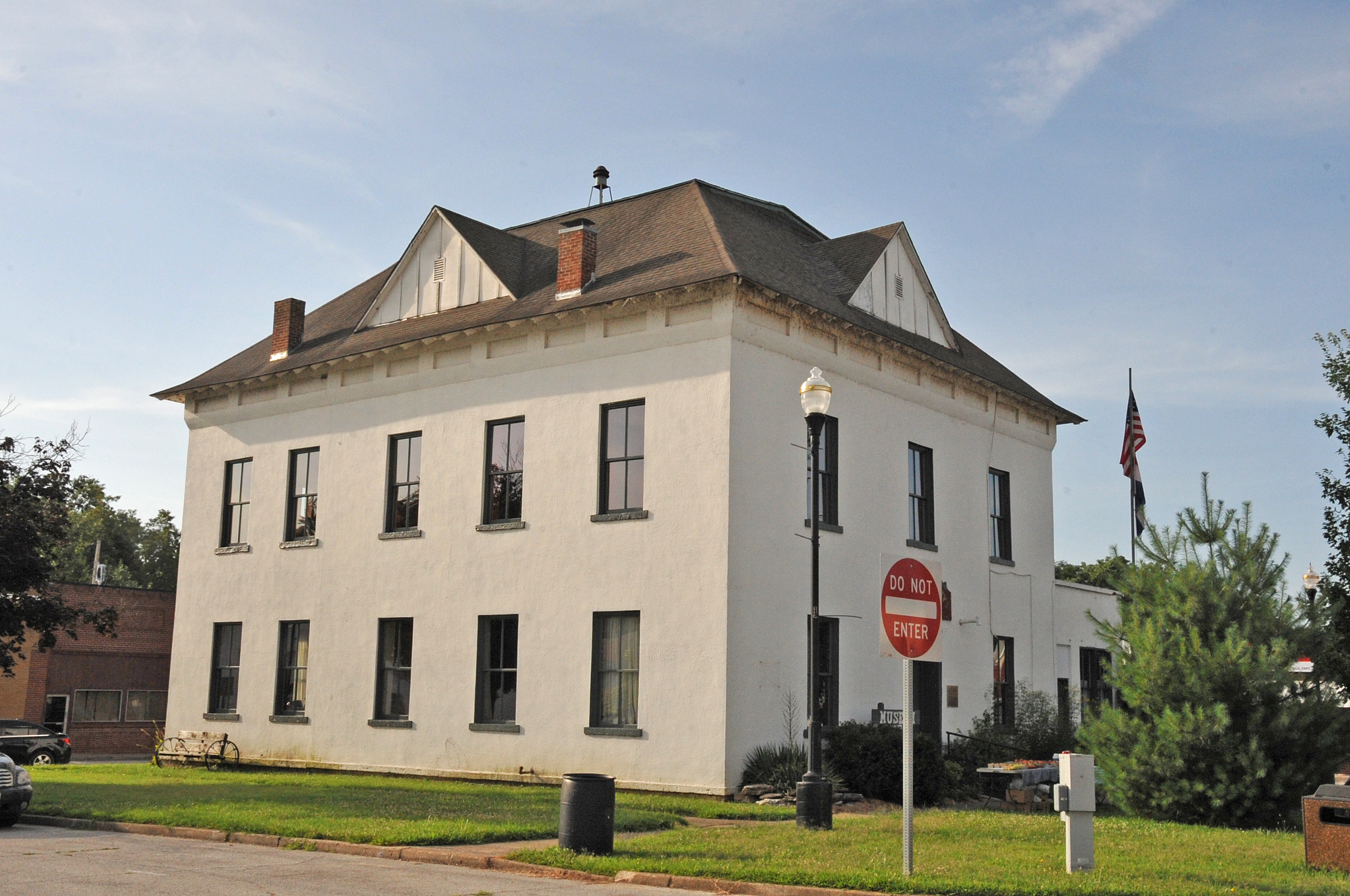
- North elevation and west profile in 2010.

- Location within Missouri Location within the United States
- Interactive map showing the location of Old McDonald County Courthouse
- Location: 400 N. Main Street, Pineville, Missouri
- Coordinates: 36°35′36.4056″N 94°23′1.7808″W
- Built: 1869-1871
- Architect: Z. P. Cogswell
- Architectural style: American Foursquare
- NRHP reference No.: 12000251
- Added to NRHP: May 1, 2012

The Old McDonald County Courthouse is a National Register of Historic Places listed building located at 400 N. Main Street in Pineville, Missouri, the county seat of McDonald County, Missouri. It is situated in the center of Pineville's town square and served as the county's courthouse from 1871 until 1978, when a new courthouse was constructed two blocks north of the square. The structure underwent a significant restoration from 2010 to 2015 and is currently operated as a museum by the McDonald County Historical Society. It is designed in the American Foursquare style and was featured in the 1939 film Jesse James, which starred Tyrone Power as the titular outlaw and Henry Fonda as his brother Frank James. It is one of three sites in the county on the National Register of Historic Places, which also includes the Powell Bridge in the rural community of Powell, Missouri.

The main, two-story section of the building is three bays on the east and west and five bays on the north and south. Its current stucco exterior, which was added in 1943, covers thick, load-bearing walls that consist of soft, locally made bricks, many of which were salvaged from the rubble of a previous courthouse on the site. The building is on a dressed and faced stone foundation with a stone water table and the hipped roof is slightly flared, with each slope containing a vented dormer. A paneled frieze circles the entire second floor of the structure and the courthouse's numerous double-hung 2-on-2 windows appear original. The one-story addition on the south side of the courthouse was added in 1943, at the same time the stucco exterior was applied, which was necessary to protect the soft bricks from deterioration.

== Previous courthouses ==
Upon the creation of McDonald County from neighboring Newton County on March 3, 1849, two communities, Rutledge and Maryville (which was later renamed Pineville) vied to be the county seat. The competition included an 1850 confrontation in Rutledge that resulted in the death of three participants. As such, from 1849 until the winter of 1857 the county operated with two courthouses, the one in Rutledge being a log structure, and two sets of officials. Finally, the Missouri General Assembly appointed commissioners to select the permanent location of the county seat, that choice being Pineville.

=== 1858 Courthouse ===
The first courthouse in Pineville, following the official designation of the town as the county seat, was a one-story frame building built in 1858-59. It measured 30 feet square and stood at the corner of Third and Main. The site of that first courthouse would later be a livery stable.

=== 1861 Courthouse ===
The second courthouse was a three-story brick building built in 1861. It was located in the approximate location of the existing Old McDonald County Courthouse in the center of the town square. The top story was reserved for the Freemasons, though the main lodge room was apparently never used for this purpose. The anteroom on the third floor, however, was rented for circuit and county clerk's office space. During the Civil War, McDonald County faced a tumultuous period, with residents' alliances split between the Union and the Confederacy. The result of this led the rise of bushwackers in the area. In August or September 1863 the courthouse was burned during an attack by bushwackers from south of town, led by a local man named Bill Hinson, destroying most of the county's records. The only records believed to be saved from the fire were a few carried away by County Clerk Absolem Applebee (A.A.) Hensley (1810-1882).

== Construction ==
Lacking a permanent courthouse for three years, in November 1866 the court appointed a representative to rent rooms for county use and to sell the bricks and bats from the old courthouse. Roman Malach, a local historian, noted a payment of $25 made to Neosho-based millwright and architect Zelats P. Cogswell (1829–1900) for designing the plans of a new courthouse beginning in 1869. Cogswell's design for the 2 1/2-story building was an early version of what would become the American Foursquare style, notable for a boxy, symmetrical design. And on December 27, 1869 the court accepted the low bid of $4,949.50 from contractors Willis R. Cox (1828-1911) and Zachariah Smith (1818-1880) for construction of the new courthouse. The courthouse was originally planned to have a wood exterior, but that detail was changed and construction began in 1870 on a brick building to measure approximately 42 by 48 feet. The building's construction included the use of some of the bricks from the previous 1861 courthouse along with new materials, including oak timber rafters and floor beams, primarily 2x12s, and soft locally made bricks. The court accepted the finished building on June 3, 1871.

The construction of the building was paid for, at least partially, by the issuance of bonds. In June 1981, George Foster, who owned the Ginger Blue Resort in the nearby McDonald County community of Ginger Blue, found in the resort's attic one of these bonds, dated June 19, 1871, that offered a face value of $100, plus 10 percent annual interest. When accounting for the interest over 110 years, the value was estimated at $3,574,636.84. The county court convened on the issue and considering the county was $5,000 in debt and its budget was less than one-third the value of Foster's bond, they rejected it on the condition for redemption of the bond, which stated "at the pleasure of the county court." Foster's discovery of the bond also fueled other people coming forward with similar bonds, but the county court rejected all of them.

=== Interior ===
As originally built, the building contained four rooms downstairs that held county offices with a large courtroom upstairs, that may have contained a holding area for prisoners at the top of an exterior stairwell. The entrances to the main long east-west hallway were double-leaf and transomed, consisting of two 3x12 doors. The transoms consisted of two glass panes separated by vertical wood muntins. The upstairs courtroom was accessed by an exterior enclosed staircase on the east side of the building. The original four-room interior with a courtroom upstairs was not elaborate, consisting of hardwood pine flooring, brick walls that were plastered and painted, and hewn lumber for the ceiling. The rudimentary appearance of the building exemplified the simplicity of McDonald County (and much of southwestern Missouri) at the time.

== Renovations and additions ==
In the century following the courthouse's construction, the building saw multiple additions and changes to enlarge and modernize it.

=== 1905 addition ===
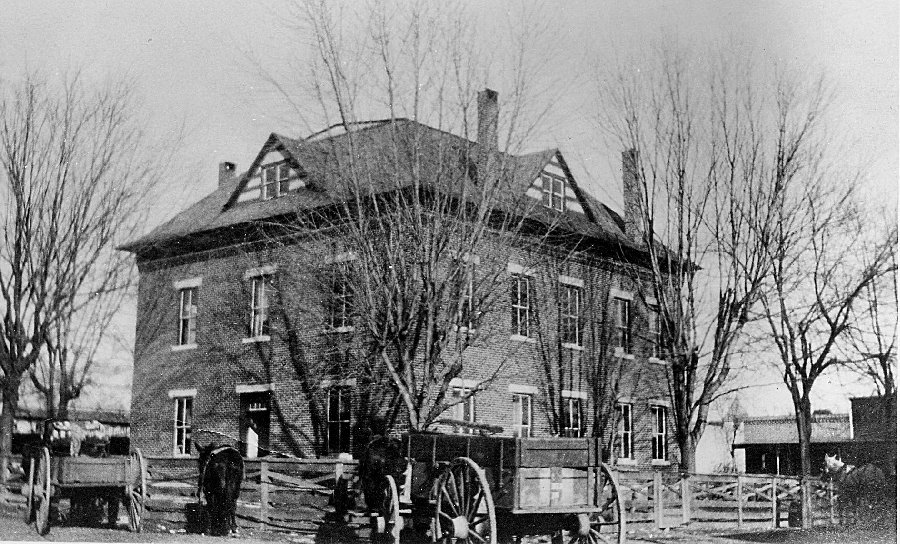
The west and south sides of the Old McDonald County Courthouse after the 1905 addition to the east side of the building.

The county commission approved a $1,500 appropriation on June 10, 1905 for an addition on the east side of the building to provide vaults for records storage. The full-height addition, like the original building, was constructed of brick and enlarged the courthouse's western exposure by approximately a third. It was during this expansion that interior staircases to the second floor and to the partially finished attic, both making 90 degree turns at the top and with tongue-and-groove wainscoting used in the sidewalls, were installed and the exterior staircase was removed. The addition also altered the original building's pure Foursquare design by adding 30 feet to the first and second floors plus two attic rooms with eight foot ceilings. Like with the construction of the original building, the addition used locally manufactured bricks and for consistency the new fenestration matched that in the original building. The addition also resulted in the dormers and chimneys being moved somewhat in order to maximize the symmetrical appearance of the now-modified Foursquare design.

The added rooms featured hardwood pine flooring, modest string course moldings and corner blocks, while the existing rooms were left with their original plank flooring. A vault was installed in the northeast corner room of the original Foursquare portion, with entry through a five-foot hallway between the original northwest room and the added-on northeast room. On the second floor, a hallway was added leading to the courtroom. The attic and the staircase above the second floor were only partially finished, with views of brick walls, rafters and other portions of the building's wood framework, and lathing readily visible. Horizontal tongue-and-groove siding was installed in the finished attic rooms. The courtroom itself was enlarged to provide more space in the jury box and seating area for attorneys. This was done by reducing the spectator section approximately four feet, which is still evidenced by marks left in the wood flooring and plastered walls. Although no records exist to indicate when this renovation to the courtroom was completed, it is surmised that these changes occurred in connection with the 1905 addition.

=== 1924 electrical installation ===
Electricity was installed in the building in 1924. This included 12 lights throughout the structure, including four in the courtroom.

=== 1943 addition ===
In 1943 a one-story frame addition with a flat roof was added along the full length of the south side of the courthouse. The addition included restrooms was needed to provide additional office and vault space. It increased the total size of the courthouse to 5,761 square feet. It was also at this time that the building was stuccoed, covering up the original brick exterior, and painted white. The stucco provided both a uniform veneer to the building and aided in preventing continued deterioration of the original soft brick exterior. Additionally, small double windows located in the attic dormers were boxed in and replaced by louvered vents and battens.

At this time, the downstairs rooms were assigned to the county clerk, collector, circuit clerk and recorder, probate judge and treasurer. And the second floor included the courtroom and offices for the superintendent of schools and the judge's chambers which doubled as a jury room.

=== 1969 renovation ===
Modern paneling was installed throughout the building's interior, covering the original painted plaster walls, and a suspended ceiling was added to the courtroom, lowering it from its original 16 foot height. During this time the courtroom was also rewired and new light fixtures were installed.

=== 1973 renovation ===
In 1973 small changes were made in the 1943 addition, when a storage area was created by moving and renovating multiple restrooms. The storage was designated for voter registration files.

== Jesse James film ==
While looking for a location to shoot his film, director Henry King first visited Clay County, Missouri, as it would have been the historically correct location, having actually been the home county of Jesse and Frank James. But King decided it looked much too modern for the film, so his friend Billy Parker, a Phillips Petroleum executive, recommended Pineville as a stand in for the town of Liberty, Missouri. Actor Tyrone Power, who portrayed Jesse James in the film, even wrote in his diary that "... the old red-brick courthouse ... in Pineville ... looks today more like yesterday's Liberty than the modern town of Liberty does ..." It took little to make courthouse camera-ready, largely limited to the addition of a temporary stone plaque over the main entrance inscribed with Clay County Courthouse. In the film itself, the courthouse is prominently featured. Major jail scenes were filmed inside the building and it also appears in outdoor shots, as the center of the public square where much action was staged.

== Threats of demolition and replacement ==
At multiple times in its history the Old McDonald County Courthouse faced potential destruction. One of the earliest came in 1940, when petitions were provided to the county asking it to hold a special election to levy bonds for the replacement of the courthouse, which only two years earlier had been featured in the Jesse James movie. The petitions sought between $20,000 and $25,000 in bond that would be used in combination with the county's share of a $80,000 Works Progress Administration project to replace the then 70 year old courthouse. And again in 1965, discussion took place of replacing the old courthouse.

In 1977, when the building of the current county courthouse was being planned, one option was to raze the existing courthouse and build on the same site. Bids were even solicited at this time for its removal, but only one was received and it was deemed too low. So the building was spared, in part due to its role in the 1939 Jesse James film. So that same year, the county court instead purchased a lot two blocks north of the city square for $10,000 with the intention of building a new courthouse. The firm of Hood-Rich, architects and consulting engineers from Springfield, Missouri, designed the one-story 72-by-84-foot masonry building and in December 1977 R. E. Smith Construction of Joplin, Missouri was chosen to building the building. The groundbreaking for the new, 5,000-square-foot building took place on December 21, 1977. The Local Public Works Capital Development and Investment Act of 1977, as amended by the Public Works Employment Act of 1977, under the U.S. Department of Commerce, provided a grant of $145,000 for construction of the building with local contributions of about $20,000 completing the funds. The dedication and open house for the new courthouse took place in July 1978, coinciding with the town's annual Jesse James Days festival, which celebrates the 1939 film that was shot in the town. At that time, it was the only new county courthouse in the state built purposely offsite to preserve its predecessor for posterity.

== Post 1978 uses ==
After being saved from the wrecking ball when the county decided to build the new courthouse on a separate lot, the building was leased in 1979 by local woman Jo Pearcy, who spearheaded some restoration work, including the replacement of some of the oak beams in the roof, and turned the upstairs courtroom into a museum and rented out the ground floor rooms for arts and crafts shops and a small cafe.

The county continued to use part of the old courthouse for the storage of county records and by the mid 1980s reclaimed the entire structure as county-designated office space. The occupants of the building at that time included the University of Missouri Extension Center's McDonald County office, which occupied first floor offices in the building for several years until 2010. The Missouri Division of Probation and Parole, which in 1996 began using the old courtroom for rehabilitation programs for people convicted of alcohol and drug related traffic offenses. And in 2004 the county provided the local chapter of Mothers Against Drunk Driving with office space in the building.

== National Register of Historic Places designation ==
Efforts to list the building on the National Register of Historic Places began as early as 1978, when the county court and other advocates pushed for inclusion on the list. Another effort for the designation was made in 1996, when Mayor Marylin Carnell conducted research and reached out to the state Department of Natural Resources for guidance. But these early efforts failed and it was not until June 2012, with the McDonald County Historical Society and its president Raylene Lamb driving the efforts amid their restoration of the building that it finally earned that designation.

== Restoration ==
By 2010 the old courthouse was again vacant and in danger of being demolished. So to preserve the building, the county government entered an agreement with the McDonald County Historical Society that provided a set 10-year lease with an automatic renewal. The goal of the society for taking possession of the old courthouse was to restore it to the time period of its 1905 addition and reopen it as a museum. After taking occupancy of the building, the historical society quickly began removing the suspended ceilings and paneling that were installed in 1969, revealing the building's original high ceilings, elegant wooden beams and decorative woodwork. The windows and doors were restored and the original wooden beams and moldings were refinished to their original state to reveal the natural wood. In cases of deteriorated and unsalvageable historic materials, some replication was done. Central heat and air was installed to provide climate control for artifacts, with the majority of the heat/air duct work run above the vault areas and hidden from view. And to provide handicapped access to the upstairs, an elevator is planned to be installed in the southeast rooms, the lower of which was divided in 2005 to create two handicapped accessible restrooms funded by a grant for a Visitors Center Affiliate.

== Historical Society Museum ==
The McDonald County Historical Society was established in 1963 and under its guidance the old courthouse has been restored and turned into a museum focused on the history of the county. The museum opened to the public in May 2013, though at that time only the downstairs was finished with the upstairs courtroom yet to be restored. But by 2015 the restoration of the upstairs courtroom and county prosecutor's office was complete. The museum is open Fridays and Saturdays during the summer months and includes exhibit areas focused on the 1939 Jesse James film; early county education; the music history of the county, which includes a focus on famed gospel songwriter Albert E. Brumley; local military service; a drug store exhibit; and a restored courtroom and county prosecutor's office.
