= Cora Hubbard =

19th-century outlaw and bank robber

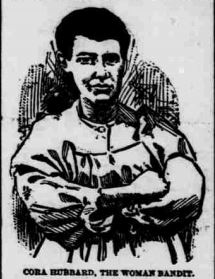
- Drawing of Cora Hubbard from the Rock Island (Illinois) Argus
- Born: Cora Hubbard; February 1877; Columbus, Ohio
- Died: Unknown
- Other names: Cora Parker, Cora Russell, Cora Sheets
- Spouse(s): John Sheets, Bud Parker
- Status: Pardoned effective January 1, 1905
- Criminal charges: Bank robbery
- Penalty: 12 years
- Accomplices: John Sheets, Albert Whitfield “Whit” Tennison

Cora Hubbard (February 1877 – 19??) was a 19th-century outlaw who participated in the August 17, 1897, robbing of the McDonald County Bank in Pineville, Missouri. Hubbard, who was compared at the time to the more prolific female outlaw Belle Starr, was one of only a handful of women who actively participated in the actual bank robbery process during that era.

== Background ==
Though Hubbard claimed to be 28 at the time of the robbery, which would have put her birth in 1870, the 1880 U.S. Census listed her age as three, which would have meant she was born in 1877. In addition, the 1885 Kansas state census puts her birth year at about 1876 and the 1900 federal census, where she is listed as an inmate at a prison in Cole County, Missouri, lists her birth as being in February 1877. Hubbard was born in Ohio to Union Army veteran Samuel C. and Elizabeth Hubbard. She was the sixth of their seven children and their third and final daughter. In the 1880 census, Samuel (1841–1919) is listed as a cross tie maker and the family is listed as living in the Cedar township of Callaway County, Missouri. Between 1880 and 1885, Elizabeth Hubbard died and the family moved from Missouri to Kansas, living in the Spring Hill Township of Johnson County and later Weir City.

By August 17, 1897, Cora had married and divorced one husband, James Russell, and had married her second husband, "Bud" Parker, just a month and a half earlier. At the time of her crime she was living on Parker's farm in Indian Territory (now Oklahoma) not far from the Kansas state line.

== Plan ==
The plans for the robbery started on Bud Parker's farm near Nowata, Oklahoma, where he had recently brought his new bride, Cora. Cora's brothers Al and William “Bill” Hubbard were living in the same area around this time and John Sheets, a 23-year-old from Missouri, was working on the Parker farm as a hired hand. It is likely the arrival of 31-year-old Albert Whitfield “Whit” Tennison, who drifted into the area that August, was the genesis for the bank robbery plan. Tennison claimed he had previous experience in bank robbing and soon had the group rallied around his idea. The McDonald County Bank was chosen because Bill Hubbard had previously lived in Pineville and knew its layout. Bill Hubbard drew up the map and Bud Parker, Sheets, Tennison and Al Hubbard were designated to execute the plan. But, when the time came for it to be put into action, both Parker and Al Hubbard backed out. Cora then left with Sheets and Tennison and reportedly told her husband that she would not live with a “damn coward.”

On their way to Pineville, the three would-be bank robbers stopped in Coffeyville, Kansas, so Sheets could buy a Winchester rifle and ammunition. They then headed to Cora's father's home in Weir City. Sam Hubbard reported that when his daughter arrived she had her hair cut short and was dressed in men's clothing. After spending a couple days in Weir City, the group headed for Pineville, more than 60 miles away.

The gang arrived in Pineville on August 16, 1897, and set up camp outside the town. The following morning, Sheets and Tennison went into town and checked out the layout and to make sure there were not any notable complications for their plan. Seeing none, they returned to the camp to get Cora.

== Robbery ==
Sheets, Tennison and Cora come into Pineville on the morning of August 17, 1897, and stopped about a block from the bank. Hubbard was left to hold the gang's horses while Sheets and Tennison headed to the bank to carry out the robbery. Sheets and Tennison snuck around the corner of the bank and drew their weapons on three men sitting in front of the building, A.V. Manning, president of the bank; John W. Shields, Cashier; and Marcus N. LaMance, county treasurer. They reportedly told the three men, "we're here for the money and we want it damn quick."

Sheets went into the bank with Manning and Shields, while Tennison stayed outside with LaMance to keep watch. Once inside the bank, Shields countered Sheets' demands and Sheets knocked him to the ground with his rifle. Sheets then ordered Manning to hold a sack while Shields filled it with money. Shields filled it with all the coins and currency he could find, a total of $589.23 (the equivalent of $15,700 in 2009 on the Consumer Price Index scale).

Once they had the cash, Sheets herded Shields and Manning out of the bank ahead of him. He and Tennison then moved them down the street in front of them in an effort to keep bystanders from shooting. By the time they reached where Hubbard was waiting with the horses, Tennison had also taken Manning's $15 silver watch.

== Escape and capture ==
From the stable, Sheets, Tennyson and Hubbard mounted up and headed to the northeast. A posse quickly formed in Pineville and followed the small gang. Meanwhile, the gang changed direction and headed around Pineville, but someone reported the change in town and it was telegraphed to Noel, Missouri, about five miles southwest of Pineville. That afternoon, a search party from Pineville got in front of fugitives and joined another posse from Noel at the crossing of Butler Creek to lie in ambush. When Tennison, Sheets and Hubbard started to ride down a gulch toward the creek, the posse opened fire, wounding both Tennison and Sheets with buckshot, mortally wounding Sheet's horse and shooting Cora Hubbard's revolver out of her hand. The gang returned fire, slightly wounding one deputy. Tennison's horse became frightened in the clash, running away and separating him from Hubbard and Sheets. Sheets and Hubbard turned their horses around and made their way out of the gulch before Sheets' horse collapsed and died. Tennison's horse was later found grazing not far from the scene, but the robber was not with it. The next day, a report of a man paying for his breakfast the next morning in Indian Territory, about 25 miles from Pineville, and paid for it in pennies, which coincided with the fact that many pennies had been taken in the robbery. A posse headed by Joe Yeargain of Southwest City, Missouri, followed that tip and found Tennison wounded in a cabin 20 miles inside Indian Territory, he had a .45 Winchester, .45 revolver and $121.50 from the robbery. He was captured without incident and was taken to Neosho, Missouri, about 30 miles north of Pineville, where he was housed in the Newton County jail. From Tennison, the posse learned that Hubbard and Sheets were from Weir City. Yeargain then headed the posse to that Kansas town.

Hubbard and Sheets had stolen a horse at gunpoint near where the shootout had happened, providing them both with a means to escape. They traveled 70 miles to Parsons, Kansas, from where Hubbard took a train back to Weir City on the morning of August 21. Sheets promised to follow in a day or two, and from Weir City the pair planned to escape to Iowa.

Shortly after Cora Hubbard returned to her father's home in Weir City the posse also arrived. City Marshal Jim Hatton went to her father's house under the ruse of borrowing his tar kettle and discovered Cora there. As the posse was returning to the home to arrest her, they located Bill Hubbard and arrested him for his role in the robbery, which they had been informed of by Tennison. After taking Bill Hubbard to the city jail, they returned to the Hubbard home, where Cora answered the door and obediently put up her hands "like a child at play putting up its hands before a toy pistol."

A later search of the Hubbard home by Marshal Hatton turned up $161 buried in the vegetable garden, $25 in a hill of peppers and the additional $141 in a hill of potatoes. Also on the premises they found the men's clothes worn by Cora Hubbard during the holdup. In response to this find, McDonald County Sheriff Richard Jarrett and Shields, the back cashier, went to Weir City on August 26. While they were interrogating Sam Hubbard, John Sheets drove up unaware in a buggy and was quickly arrested. In his buggy they found an additional $91 and a .45-caliber six-shooter. Along with Sheets, Sam Hubbard was also arrested and taken back to Missouri because of his reluctance to cooperate with officers in their search for the loot.

== Conviction ==
Sam and Bill Hubbard were released at Pineville on August 28, the day of the preliminary hearing for the three bank robbers. Cora Hubbard, John Sheets and Whit Tennyson were bound over for trial and returned to the Newton County jail in Neosho. They were convicted of bank robbery in January 1898 and sentenced to the state prison at Jefferson City — Hubbard and Sheets for 12 years each and Tennyson for 10. Missouri Governor Alexander Monroe Dockery commuted Cora's sentence the day after Christmas in 1904, and she was released on New Year's Day 1905. During her imprisonment, the one-time bank robber had let her hair grow out but had apparently done little else to enhance her feminine allure in the eyes of the reporter who described her at the time of her release as "short in stature with ... black eyes and a greasy dark complexion."

== Accomplices ==
Albert Whitfield Tennison was born in either September 1865 or on November 25, 1863, in Illinois. He is listed as married in the 1900 census, when he was in the custody of the Missouri State Penitentiary. In the 1910 census he is married to the former Emma Hogan, but had only been married to her for three years. He died on December 12, 1932, in Hudspeth County, Texas.

John Sheets was born in Missouri in December 1876. He lived for a time in Weir City, Kansas before becoming a farm hand for Bud Parker, Cora Hubbard's second husband. In the 1900 census, he is in the custody of the Missouri State Penitentiary and is listed as single. No additional information has been located on him.

Bud Parker was a farmer with a farm near what is now Nowata, Oklahoma. Though he was initially part of the plan to rob the McDonald County Bank, he eventually backed out, to the scorn of his new bride.

William "Bill" Hubbard was Cora's oldest brother who was born around 1865 in Ohio. He was the oldest child in the family and for a time lived in Pineville, Missouri and drew a plan of the town to aid in the robbery. He was arrested and later released.

Albert "Al" Hubbard was another of Cora's older brothers. He was born around 1871 in Ohio. He was living near the Parker farm when the robbery was planned and was originally planning to take part in the crime, but later backed out.

== Later life ==
Little is known about Cora after her release from prison. She is listed as being divorced in the 1900 census, making it unlikely that she went back to her second husband, Bud Parker, after her release. But a small note in a Jefferson City newspaper did remark on her release in 1904. It said she had been employed as a seamstress during her incarceration and had been a model prisoner. Now proficient at sewing, she planned to seek employment in that line of work.

== Legacy ==
As one of only a handful of female bank robbers, Cora Hubbard's legacy has survived, even though her known life of crime only included a single bank robbery. As soon as it was originally reported that one of the members of the gang was a woman, area headlines called her the "Second Belle Starr" and proclaimed "Female Bandit Rivals the Daring Deeds of Belle Starr and Kate Bender." Further enhancing this legacy is the only known photo of Cora, which shows her dressed in the men's clothing she wore during the robbery and holding her rifle alongside co-conspirators Tennison and Sheets.

In addition, Cora had previously bragged about being a member of the Dalton Gang. Although this would seem unlikely since she would have been only 15 at the time that infamous gang was obliterated, a Colt .45 revolver with the name "Bob Dalton" etched on the handle and seven notches carved near the trigger guard was found in her father's home after her arrest. This seemed to substantiate her claims that she had been with the Dalton Gang in earlier years and that she had Bob Dalton's six-shooter. The notches were presumed to represent the number of men killed with the Colt.
