= McDonald Territory =

Short-lived, unrecognized provisional government in mid-western U.S.

- Status: Unrecognized state
- Capital: Pineville
- Largest city: Anderson

Government
  - President: Z.L. McGowan (1961-1962), Dan M. Harmon (1962)
- Today part of: Missouri, United States

The McDonald Territory was an extralegal, unrecognized territory of the United States that comprised all of McDonald County, Missouri and existed for a short time from 1961 to 1962. In 1961, a provisional government chose the name when they attempted to secede the county from the state of Missouri. The government of the territory was never recognized by the State of Missouri nor the United States Congress. Described by the Neosho Daily News as a "publicity stunt", the McDonald Territory's claims to independence were rarely taken seriously by those not involved.

== Background ==
In 1961, the Missouri State Highway Commission published its annual Family Vacationland Map and distributed it around the state. Officials in McDonald County discovered upon reviewing the map that the small but economically vital Ozarks resort town of Noel, as well as Pineville, Southwest City, and "other significant historical and scenic points of interest in McDonald County" were omitted from the publication.

President McGowan and Chief Saugee show-off newly erected "Welcome to McDonald Territory" sign

Noel, located in the southwest corner of the state, was one of the most popular tourist destinations in that part of the state due to its resorts, bluffs, caves, and rivers. Its absence on one of the most popular tourist maps in the state hurt the town, with McDonald Territory President and Noel Mayor Dan Harmon later describing 1961 as "one of our poorest years".

Although a spokesman for the Missouri highway commission said that Noel's exclusion from the map was intentional on the basis that the area was too commercial and commercial attractions were not listed in the guide, Governor John M. Dalton apologized for it, calling it a "serious oversight".

This was the culmination of a series of multiple frustrations with the Missouri state government experienced by McDonald County. In 1960, U.S. Route 71 was rerouted away from Noel, separating the highway from several of the local attractions. The number of the highway running through Noel also changed twice, confusing tourists. Some also complained of high taxes, with one local merchant allegedly saying that, "this southwestern corner of Missouri could join Arkansas and not be so heavily taxed".

== History ==
McDonald Co. / Missouri; Benton Co. / Arkansas; Delaware Co. / Oklahoma; / (Kansas); Map of the proposed union with Benton County, Arkansas and Delaware County, Oklahoma

To demonstrate their dissatisfaction with the state's inattention to detail and apparent lack of respect for their rural isolated county, local officials drafted a resolution to secede from the state, and to possibly form a 51st state in union with Benton County, Arkansas and Delaware County, Oklahoma. Such a state would have had 11,798 McDonald County residents at its core. Few people took the effort seriously and as anything other than a publicity stunt.

Governor Orval E. Faubus of Arkansas was willing to accept McDonald County into Arkansas, but this plan never came to fruition. Giving Native Americans control of the land, which was suggested by Chief Henry Saugee of the Cherokee tribe of the nearby Jay, Oklahoma, was also under consideration.

== Provisional government ==
McDonald County set up a provisional government and printed their own tourism literature. They elected and appointed officers, but there is conflicting reporting on who held many government positions. A local territorial militia was formed and visas were issued. Vehicles entering the territory were stopped by militiamen, and if the occupants were not local residents, they were given entry visas and local tourism information.

The government of the territory also established a dispatch service, which provided mail service from the territorial post office to the nearest U.S. Post Office. This service issued a series of six two cent stamps to charge for its services.

== Activity ==
In April 1961, during a mock battle between the territorial militia and troops from nearby Jasper County, a Jasper County soldier was accidentally injured when his musket exploded. He received minor cuts and burns.

The McDonald Territory hosted a fishing derby that had paid out over $500 in prize money as of May 1962.
