= Powell Bridge =

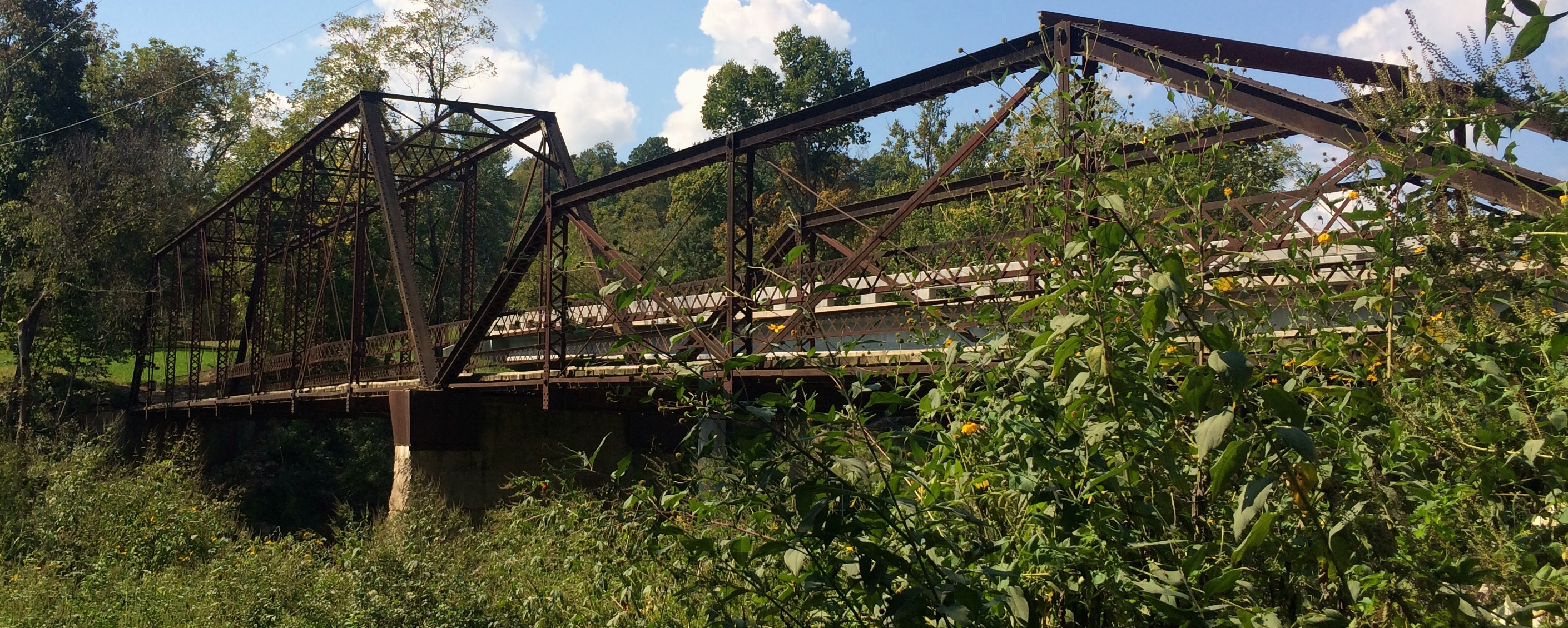
- Powell Bridge
- Coordinates: 36.6160766°N 94.1820064°W
- Powell Bridge
- U.S. National Register of Historic Places
- Location within Missouri Location within the United States
- Location: 0.4 miles (0.64 km) southwest of Powell on Cowan Ridge Rd. off Highway E, near Powell, Missouri
- Coordinates: 36.6160766°N 94.1820064°W
- Built: 1914-1915
- Architect: East St. Louis Bridge Co.
- Architectural style: Pin-connected Pratt through truss bridge
- NRHP reference No.: 11000215
- Added to NRHP: April 20, 2011
- Carries: Single lane
- Crosses: Big Sugar Creek
- Locale: Powell, Missouri
- Owner: Jack Hollingworth

Characteristics
- Design: Pin-connected Pratt through truss bridge
- Total length: 210 feet (64 m)
- Width: 12 feet (4 m)

History
- Designer: East St. Louis Bridge Co.
- Construction start: 1914; 112 years ago
- Opened: 1915; 111 years ago
- Closed: To auto traffic 2014

Location
- Interactive map of Powell Bridge

The Powell Bridge is a National Register of Historic Places site that crosses Big Sugar Creek near the community of Powell, Missouri, a rural hamlet in McDonald County, Missouri in the Ozark Mountains region. The bridge was built by the East St. Louis Bridge Co. and was opened to traffic on August 16, 1915. The single-lane pin-connected Pratt through truss was open to vehicular traffic from 1915 until a new two-lane bridge was built and opened beside it in 2015. It is currently owned by the Powell Historic Preservation Society and is one of three sites in McDonald County on the National Register of Historic Places, which also includes the Old McDonald County Courthouse. The community of Powell itself is best known as the home of famed gospel writer Albert E. Brumley.

== Description ==
The Powell Bridge consists of a 140’ 8-panel pin-connected Pratt through truss main span of wrought iron with a square arch and 70’ 4-panel pin-connected Pratt pony truss approach span, which equals a total bridge length of more than 210 feet. It was constructed to have a 12’ wide roadway. The substructure includes concrete abutments, wing walls and a pier cap reinforced with steel plate. The floor/decking is timber deck over steel stringers. The bridge has both a through and a pony configuration. Traffic travels through the Pratt truss of the superstructure which is cross-braced above and below the traffic and also through the pony truss, which are parallel superstructures which are not cross-braced at the top. It is one of only two bridges of this style built in McDonald County, the other was constructed in Anderson, Missouri and has since been demolished.

== History ==
Prior to the construction of the bridge, most of those crossing the creek in this vicinity crossed at the Bentonville Hollow Ford, near the current location of the bridge. But the use of a ford was unreliable, as during high water it was impassable. So in June 1913, R.H. Buck initiated a petition for a bridge to be built over the creek to the McDonald County Courthouse. The Court accepted the petition and ordered W. Mose Lett, the county surveyor and also a Powell resident, to seek out a site for the bridge near the ford, of the Powell community. As the ex-official county highway engineer, the county court also requested Lett to prepare the plans and specifications and advertise for bids for the bridge. The East St. Louis Bridge Co. bid $2,240 for the superstructure of the bridge and Fred L. Appleby of Kansas City bid $1,290 for the substructure. After wood fills and grading expenses, the total price of the Powell Bridge was $4,000.00, the total amount of available funds the county had allotted for the project. Construction of the bridge took place over approximately one year, from 1914-1915. Appleby built the massive concrete pier and concrete abutments with wing walls. Lett, the engineer, was on site to supervise the construction. Local labor was readily available, as were materials. Sycamore logs were cut and hauled to the bridge site by wagon and a team of horses to use for scaffolding. The local in charge of sawing the logs, a Mr. Cowan, donated every other load of logs. Once completed, the bridge provided a replacement for several low-water crossings in the area around Powell and helped the community thrive for the next several decades.

== Replacement ==
At the time of its construction, the traffic on the bridge was largely limited to buggies, wagons, horses and pedestrian, but in the intervening near century of use modes of transportation changed and while it remained in good condition, the structural limitations of the one lane bridge precluded modern agricultural equipment use and the heavier trucks built today, including emergency vehicles. As a 3-ton load limit was posted for the bridge. As the need for a new bridge became evident, the Powell Bridge was slated for demolition, but a group of residents formed a not-for-profit organization and petitioned the county commissioners to save it. This proved successful and the county built a new bridge alongside it and gave ownership of the old Powell Bridge to the Powell Historical Preservation Society for adapting it as a pedestrian bridge.

== Preservation ==
Since attaining ownership of the bridge in April 2014, the Powell Historical Preservation Society has been active in the bridges restoration and upkeep. This has included replacing damaged decking and making additions to it to enhance its appeal to pedestrians. Future plans include adding seating, flower planters and child proofing.
