= Splitlog, Missouri =

Unincorporated community in the U.S. state of Missouri

Coordinates: 36°42′28″N 94°27′32″W

Splitlog is an unincorporated community in western McDonald County, in the U.S. state of Missouri. The community is located approximately four miles northwest of Anderson and 1.5 miles west of Elliff on Missouri Route 59.

== History ==
Mathias Splitlog was a member of the Wyandot people, named for his childhood apprenticeship to a carpenter, and known initially for the lumber industry he founded in Wyandotte, Kansas. A self-educated engineer, real estate speculator, and a businessman in the Missouri mining industry, Mathias plated the town site of Splitlog. A post office for Splitlog was established in 1887, and remained in operation until 1906.
