= Bear Hollow =

Valley in Missouri, United States of America

Coordinates: 36.50813°N 94.231319°W

Bear Hollow is a valley in McDonald County in the U.S. state of Missouri.

Some say Bear Hollow derives its name from a corruption of Baer, the surname of a local family, while others believe the area was a hunting ground of bears, causing the name to be selected.
