= Thomas Hollow =

Valley in Missouri, United States

Coordinates: 36.677292°N 94.098819°W

Thomas Hollow is a valley in Barry and McDonald Counties in the U.S. state of Missouri.

Thomas Hollow has the name of the local Thomas family.
