= Boone Hollow =

Valley in Missouri, United States

Coordinates: 36.6325721°N 94.212432°W

Boone Hollow is a valley in McDonald County in the U.S. state of Missouri.

Boone Hollow has the name of the local Boone family.
