= Havenhurst, Missouri =

Unincorporated community in Missouri, U.S.

Coordinates: 36°35′00″N 94°22′28″W

Havenhurst is an unincorporated community in southern McDonald County, Missouri, United States. The community is located on Missouri Route K, just north of U.S. Route 71, approximately one mile southeast of Pineville. The site is on the bank of Little Sugar Creek.

The community name reflects its development as a resort area.
