= Grannys Branch =

Stream in McDonald County, Missouri, U.S.

Coordinates: 36.6147951°N 94.2568774°W

Grannys Branch is a stream in McDonald County in the U.S. state of Missouri.

Grannys Branch was named after an unidentified elderly person.

== See also ==
- List of rivers of Missouri
