= Cyclone, Missouri =

Unincorporated community in Missouri, U.S.

Coordinates: 36°37′06″N 94°15′23″W

Cyclone is an unincorporated community in east central McDonald County, in the U.S. state of Missouri. The community is located on Big Sugar Creek west of Powell.

== History ==
A post office called Cyclone was established in 1883, and remained in operation until 1955. The community was named for a cyclone (tornado) which stuck the area in 1880.
