= Smith Hollow =

Valley in Missouri, United States

Coordinates: 36.679236°N 94.105763°W

Smith Hollow is a valley in McDonald County in the U.S. state of Missouri.

Smith Hollow has the name of the local Smith family.
