= Big Cedar Hollow =

Valley in Missouri, United States

Coordinates: 36.6339614°N 94.2663225°W

Big Cedar Hollow is a valley in McDonald County in the U.S. state of Missouri.

Big Cedar Hollow was named for the cedar timber it contains.
