= Little Sugar Creek =

Stream in McDonald County, Missouri and Benton County, Arkansas in the United States

Little Sugar Creek is a stream in northwestern Benton County, Arkansas and southwestern McDonald County, Missouri in the United States, that is a tributary of the Elk River (Oklahoma).

== Description ==
The headwaters of the stream arise in northeast Benton County just southeast of Garfield (at 36°25′09″N 93°55′53″W). The stream flows west crossing under U.S. Route 62 west of Brightwater and Arkansas routes 94 and 72 south of Pea Ridge. The stream turns to the northwest and flows parallel to U.S. Route 62 through the Bella Vista area to enter Missouri at the community of Caverna. In Missouri the stream flows northwest passing under Missouri Route 90. The stream passes the community of Havenhurst and reaches its confluence with Big Sugar Creek to form the Elk River just south of Pineville (36°35′18″N 94°22′58″W). At Pineville, the creek measures approximately 224 cubic feet per second. Ironically, this stream is actually larger than the so-called "Big" Sugar Creek (see Big Sugar Creek for its discharge).

== See also ==
- List of rivers of Arkansas
- List of rivers of Missouri
