= Buffalo Creek (Elk River tributary, Oklahoma) =

Location
- Country: United States
- States: Missouri, Oklahoma

Buffalo Creek is a stream in McDonald and Newton counties in Missouri and Delaware County, Oklahoma. It is a tributary of the Elk River.

The stream headwaters arise in Newton County south of Neosho near the campus of Crowder College at 36°48′15″N 94°21′38″W and it flows west passing under US Route 71 and then southwest into McDonald County passing the community of May. It continues to the southwest passing under Missouri routes 43 and 76 and the community of Tiff City and into Oklahoma. It reaches its confluence with the Elk about two miles southwest of the border at 36°38′04″N 94°37′53″W.

Buffalo Creek was named for the fact a pioneer killed a buffalo near its banks.

== See also ==
- List of rivers of Missouri
- List of rivers of Oklahoma
