= Layton Hollow =

Valley in Missouri, United States

Coordinates: 36.6893106°N 94.0870857°W

Layton Hollow is a valley in Barry and McDonald County in the U.S. state of Missouri.

Layton Hollow has the name of the local Layton family.
