= Mikes Creek =

Stream in southwestern Missouri, U.S.

Mikes Creek is a stream in Barry and McDonald counties of the Ozarks of southwestern Missouri.

The headwaters are in western Barry County at 36°43′22″N 94°03′28″W and the confluence with Big Sugar Creek is in McDonald County at 36°37′27″N 94°11′12″W. The source of the stream is in western Barry County to the southeast of Rocky Comfort in northeast McDonald County. The stream flows southwest paralleling Missouri Route U then turns west to its confluence just northwest of Powell.

Some say Mike's Creek was named after an elderly settler named Mike, while others believe the name is a corruption of Michael, the surname of Phillip Michael, a pioneer citizen.

== See also ==
- List of rivers of Missouri
