= Wolf Pen Hollow =

Valley in Missouri, United States

Coordinates: 36.570073°N 94.359380°W

Wolf Pen Hollow is a valley in McDonald County in the U.S. state of Missouri.

Wolf Pen Hollow took its name from the wolf pen, a device used to trap wolves.
