= Green Hollow =

Valley in Missouri

Coordinates: 36.5684069°N 94.3218785°W

Green Hollow is a valley in McDonald County in the U.S. state of Missouri.

The name "Green Hollow" likely derives from a local family surnamed Green that lived in the valley.
