= Blankenship Hollow =

Valley in Missouri, United States

Coordinates: 36.5670177°N 94.4266041°W

Blankenship Hollow is a valley in McDonald County in the U.S. state of Missouri.

Blankenship Hollow has the name of the local Blankenship family.
