= Coy, Missouri =

Unincorporated community in the U.S. state of Missouri

Coordinates: 36°39′40″N 94°31′56″W

Coy is an unincorporated community in western McDonald County, in the U.S. state of Missouri. The community is located about mid-way between Anderson and Tiff City along the south side of the Patterson Creek valley. Missouri Route 76 passes about three-quarters of a mile to the south.

== History ==
A post office called Coy was established in 1886, and remained in operation until 1903. The community was named after George McCoy, a local merchant.
