= Blackjack Hollow =

Valley in Missouri, United States

- Location within Missouri

Geography
- Location: McDonald County, Missouri, United States
- Coordinates: 36.6000719°N 94.1585409°W
- Interactive map of Blackjack Hollow

Blackjack Hollow is a valley in McDonald County in the U.S. state of Missouri.

Blackjack Hollow was named for the blackjack oak timber it contains.
