= Beeman Hollow =

Valley in Missouri, United States

Coordinates: 36.723681°N 94.5654996°W

Beeman Hollow is a valley in McDonald County in the U.S. state of Missouri.

Beeman Hollow was named after James Bee(m)an, a pioneer citizen.
