= Skaggs Hollow =

Valley in Missouri, United States

Coordinates: 36.568407°N 94.302989°W

Skaggs Hollow is a valley in McDonald County in the U.S. state of Missouri.

Skaggs Hollow has the name of the local Skaggs family.
