= Peach Orchard Hollow =

Valley in Missouri, United States

Coordinates: 36.698404°N 94.373271°W

Peach Orchard Hollow is a valley in McDonald County in the U.S. state of Missouri.

Peach Orchard Hollow was so named on account of peach orchards the valley once contained.
