= Area 71 =

Coordinates: 36.500767°N 94.264648°W

Area 71 is the unofficial title for Walmart's 125,000-square-foot (11,600 m^{2}) data center, located in Jane, Missouri, near the Arkansas border. The facility has a capacity of over 460 terabytes (1 trillion bytes) of data. The facility is built directly on bedrock to better withstand natural and man-made disasters. It is self-sufficient, with generators and the capability to retain data connection with the Walmart network using copper wire, fiber optic cable, or satellite communications.

Sales patterns are analyzed here to identify trends in purchasing before major events (e.g., natural disasters, holidays) so that Walmart executives can better stock store shelves in anticipation of this event.

Walmart uses the data facility to control many functions of its stores, including control of lighting, adjusting the climate control, and playing the in-store music. The data center maintains the computer system that employees use to "clock in" at every location, and provides email to keep employees informed of events pertinent to their job function.
