= May, Missouri =

Unincorporated community in Missouri, U.S.

Coordinates: 36°45′04″N 94°31′20″W

May is an unincorporated community in northwest McDonald County, in the U.S. state of Missouri. The community is on the banks of Buffalo Creek, approximately one mile (1.6 km) south of the McDonald-Newton county line.

== History ==
A post office called May was established in 1884, and remained in operation until 1907. Some say the community has the name of May Maynard, the daughter of a local physician, while others believe the place name is derived directly from the doctor's last name.
