= Hart, McDonald County, Missouri =

Unincorporated community in the U.S. state of Missouri

Coordinates: 36°44′14″N 94°36′21″W

Hart is an unincorporated community in northwest McDonald County, in the U.S. state of Missouri. The community is located along Missouri Route 43, north of Tiff City and less than one-half mile east of the Missouri - Oklahoma border.

== History ==
A post office called Hart was established in 1883, and remained in operation until 1911. Phillip Rinehart, an early postmaster, most likely gave the community a syllable of his last name. An older source maintains the community has the name of W. B. Hart, a pioneer citizen.
