= Boulder City, Missouri =

Unincorporated community in Missouri, U.S.

Coordinates: 36°47′38″N 94°14′58″W

Boulder City is an unincorporated community in Newton County, in the U.S. state of Missouri. The community is on Missouri Route O, one mile west of Indian Creek and approximately nine miles southeast of Neosho.

Boulder City was so named on account of boulders near the original town site.
