= Simcoe, Missouri =

Unincorporated community in Missouri, U.S.

Coordinates: 36°43′18″N 94°10′03″W

Simcoe (also spelled Simco) is an unincorporated community in northeastern McDonald County, in the U.S. state of Missouri. Simcoe is located along Missouri Route 76 between Longview and Bethlehem.

== History ==
A post office called Simcoe was established in 1893, and remained in operation until 1909. According to tradition, the community took its name from a local cooperative of the same name.
