= Longview, Missouri =

Unincorporated community in Missouri, U.S.

Coordinates: 36°43′23″N 94°12′11″W

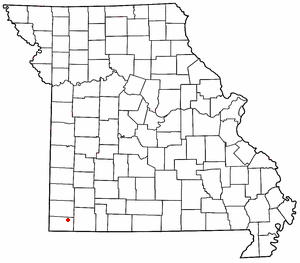

Longview is an unincorporated community in northeastern McDonald County, Missouri, United States. Longview is situated at the junction of Routes D, CC and 76. Longview is located between Simcoe to the east and Bethpage to the southwest.
