= Erie, Missouri =

Unincorporated community in the U.S. state of Missouri

Coordinates: 36°43′40″N 94°21′48″W

Erie is an unincorporated community in northern McDonald County, in the U.S. state of Missouri.

The community is located at the confluence of Bullskin Creek with Indian Creek along Missouri Route C two miles east of Goodman.

== History ==
Erie was platted in 1868. A post office called Erie was established in 1858, and remained in operation until 1901.
