= McNatt, Missouri =

Unincorporated community in the U.S. state of Missouri

Coordinates: 36°44′08″N 94°18′46″W

McNatt is an unincorporated community in north central McDonald County, in the U.S. state of Missouri.

The community is located adjacent to Indian Creek along Missouri Route C.

== History ==
A post office called McNatt was established in 1901, and remained in operation until 1907. J. J. McNatt was the proprietor of a mill near the original town site.
