= Powell, Missouri =

Unincorporated community in McDonald County, Misosuri, USA

Coordinates: 36°37′22″N 94°10′51″W

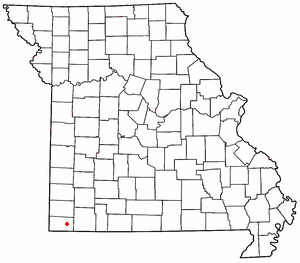

Powell is an unincorporated community on Big Sugar Creek in eastern McDonald County, Missouri, United States.

== Description ==
The community is located on Missouri Supplemental Route E, approximately ten miles (16 km) east of Pineville. The community includes some homes, a couple of businesses, and a post office. It is part of the Fayetteville–Springdale–Rogers, AR-MO Metropolitan Statistical Area. The 1915 Powell Bridge, a single-lane pin-connected Pratt through truss bridge, is 0.4 mile southwest of the community and was added to the National Register of Historic Places in 2011. A new bridge beside the 1915 structure handles all vehicular traffic, while the old Powell Bridge serves as a pedestrian crossing.

== History ==
This community sits near the juncture of Big Sugar Creek and Mikes Creek. Powell was once a thriving community and still retains many remnants of this time. At one time it had multiple general stores, a blacksmith, a gas station, several churches and a watermill. One of its general store buildings still stands and is occasionally in operation as is the Albert E. Brumley and Sons/Hartford Music Company, which has operated out of Powell since the 1940s. Owned and operated by the late gospel composer Albert E. Brumley, the hymn and songbook publishing operation was run by his son Robert Brumley up until his passing in late 2020. Albert E. Brumley's best known song, "I'll Fly Away" has been recorded by multiple Grammy Award-winning musicians and even inspired the name of a television series. Brumley also started an annual, though now defunct, Hill and Hollow craft fair and concert in a field next to his house in Powell. Through the years such celebrities as Minnie Pearl and Grandpa Jones, of country music and Hee Haw fame, performed at the venue. Brumley, along with his wife, the former Goldie Schell, are buried in Fox Cemetery just outside Powell, along with other local pioneers. Several older structures still exist in the community, but are no longer in use, such as the First Baptist Church building, the Hill and Hollow exhibit hall and an old gas station.
