= Caverna, Missouri =

Unincorporated community in Missouri, U.S.

Coordinates: 36°29′59″N 94°15′58″W

Caverna is an unincorporated community in southern McDonald County, Missouri, United States. It is located on U.S. Route 71, immediately north of the Missouri-Arkansas state line, opposite Bella Vista. Several businesses are located there.

A post office called Caverna was established in 1876, and remained in operation until 1906. The community was named for caves near the original town site.
