= Bethpage, Missouri =

Unincorporated community in Missouri, U.S.

Coordinates: 36°41′24″N 94°14′11″W

Bethpage is an unincorporated community in McDonald County, in the U.S. state of Missouri.

== History ==
A post office called Bethpage was established in 1858, and remained in operation until 1910. The community was named after Bethphage, a place in ancient Israel.
