= Albert E. Brumley =

American composer

- Born: Albert Edward Brumley; October 29, 1905 near Spiro, Oklahoma, United States
- Died: November 15, 1977 (aged 72) Powell, Missouri, United States
- Genres: Christian

Albert Edward Brumley (October 29, 1905 – November 15, 1977) was an American shape note music composer and publisher, prolific in the genre of southern gospel.

== Biography ==
Brumley was born near Spiro, Oklahoma on October 29, 1905, into a family of sharecroppers. He spent much of his early life chopping and picking cotton on his family's farm. In 1926, he enrolled in the Hartford Musical Institute of Hartford, Arkansas, and studied there through 1931. The institute was led by Eugene Monroe Bartlett (1884–1941), owner of the Hartford Music Company and composer of the well-known gospel song "Victory in Jesus". Brumley purchased Hartford Music Company in 1948.

On 30 August 1931, Brumley married Goldie Edith Schell. They lived on the banks of Big Sugar Creek in Powell, Missouri, where they raised six children.

"I'll Fly Away," "Turn Your Radio On," "If We Never Meet Again (This Side of Heaven)," "I'll Meet You in the Morning," "Rank Stranger," and "He Set Me Free" are among a host of favorites written by Albert E. Brumley. He wrote over 800 songs. He established the Albert E. Brumley Sundown to Sunup Gospel Sing (now Albert E. Brumley Gospel Sing) in 1969 in Springdale, Arkansas. Brumley has been inducted into the Nashville Songwriters Hall of Fame, Gospel Music Hall of Fame, and Oklahoma Music Hall of Fame.

== Death ==
Albert Brumley was a member of the Church of Christ and is buried at Fox Church of Christ Cemetery near Powell, Missouri. He died November 15, 1977. Brumley's son Tom, who would die in 2009, later became a respected steel guitarist in country music and songleader in the Church of Christ in Powell.
