= Missouri Route 59 =

State highway in Missouri, U.S.

Route 59

Route information
- Maintained by MoDOT
- Length: 46.475 mi (74.794 km)

Major junctions
- South end: AR 59 at the Arkansas state line near Noel
- I-49 / US 71 at Goodman; I-49 BL / US 60 / US 60 Bus. at Neosho
- North end: I-44 / I-49 / US 71 at Fidelity

Location
- Country: United States
- State: Missouri

Highway system
- Missouri State Highway System; Interstate; US; State; Supplemental
← US 59	→ US 60

Route 59 is a highway in southwest Missouri running from the Arkansas state line north to I-44/I-49 at Fidelity. It replaced a large section of U.S. Route 71 and Alternate US 71 in sections. The first section was designated in 1960 between Lanagan and the Arkansas state line when US 71 was moved down the former Route 88. In the 1990s, US 71 was moved and upgraded to interstate standards from Neosho to Lanagan and Route 59 was extended north to Neosho. When US 71 was moved east of Joplin in the late 1990s, Alternate US 71 was deleted, and Route 59 was extended north to replace that highway. The highway was numbered after Arkansas Highway 59.

== Route description ==
Route 59 is a two-lane highway for its entire length except for a short section in southern Neosho where it forms a concurrency with Business I-49.

The highway begins at the Arkansas state line where it is continued from Arkansas Highway 59. The road runs under some of the bluffs along the Elk River (with signs warning of low clearance for trucks). It also runs into a very scenic area, squeezed between steep bluffs and the railroad then passes through Noel and briefly has a concurrency with Route 90 then curves east where it runs next to the Kansas City Southern Railway for several miles then passes through Anderson. At Anderson, there is a short concurrency with Route 76 then has a concurrency with Business US 71 and turning into a windy road until it intersects with I-49 at a partial interchange.

Then, it leaves McDonald County before passing through Goodman. In Neosho, Route 59 picks ups a concurrency with U.S. Route 60 and then picks up Route 86 for a brief moment. There is an interchange with the northern junction with U.S. Route 60 northeast of Neosho where US 60 concurrency ends. The road remains two lanes (US 60 is also two lanes here) for the interchange. Next, Route 59 passes through Diamond. Finally, the highway becomes a freeway and ends at I-44/I-49/US 71 at a cloverleaf interchange in Fidelity where the road continues north as I-49/US 71 heading towards Kansas City.

== Major intersections ==
County	Location	mi	km	Destinations	Notes
McDonald	Elk River Township	0.000	0.000	AR 59 south – Sulphur Springs	Continuation into Arkansas
McDonald	Noel	3.336	5.369	Route 90 east	South end of Route 90 overlap
McDonald	Noel	3.660	5.890	Route 90 west – Southwest City	North end of Route 90 overlap
McDonald	Anderson	12.477	20.080	Route 76 west – Tiff City	South end of Route 76 overlap
McDonald	Anderson	13.647	21.963	US 71 Bus. south / Route 76 east	North end of Route 76 overlap; south end of US 71 Bus. overlap
McDonald	Goodman	18.347	29.527	I-49 north / US 71 north – Joplin US 71 Bus. ends	Northern terminus of US 71 Bus.; exit 16 on I-49
Newton	Neosho	23.163	37.277	I-49 BL south to Route AA	South end of I-49 BL overlap
Newton	Neosho	26.897	43.287	I-49 BL north / US 60 west / US 60 Bus. east (S. Neosho Boulevard)	North end of I-49 BL overlap; south end of US 60 overlap; western terminus of US 60 Bus.
Newton	Neosho–Granby township line	31.744	51.087	Route 86 west – Neosho	South end of Route 86 overlap
Newton	Neosho–Granby township line	31.994	51.489	Route 86 east – Cassville	North end of Route 86 overlap
Newton	Neosho–Granby township line	34.037	54.777	US 60 east / US 60 Bus. west – Neosho, Granby	North end of US 60 overlap; eastern terminus of US 60 Bus.
Jasper	Jackson Township			Southern end of freeway section	
Jasper	Jackson Township			I-44 / I-49 south / US 71 south – Joplin, Springfield	Northbound exit and southbound entrance; exit 18A on I-44
Jasper	Jackson Township	46.475	74.794	I-49 north / US 71 north – Kansas City	Northern terminus; exit 46A on I-49
1.000 mi = 1.609 km; 1.000 km = 0.621 mi: Concurrency terminus; Incomplete access
