= Noel, Missouri =

City in McDonald County, Missouri, United States

- City
- Location in McDonald County and the state of Missouri
- Coordinates: 36°32′38″N 94°29′21″W
- Country: United States
- State: Missouri
- County: McDonald

Area
  - Total: 2.10 sq mi (5.44 km^{2})
  - Land: 2.03 sq mi (5.25 km^{2})
  - Water: 0.077 sq mi (0.20 km^{2})
- Elevation: 846 ft (258 m)

Population (2020)
  - Total: 2,124
  - Density: 1,048.7/sq mi (404.92/km^{2})
- Time zone: UTC-6 (Central (CST))
  - Summer (DST): UTC-5 (CDT)
- ZIP Code: 64854
- Area code: 417
- FIPS code: 29-52742
- GNIS feature ID: 2395242
- Website: noelmo.org

Noel is a city on the Elk River and Butler and Mill creeks in McDonald County, Missouri, United States. The population was 2,124 as of the 2020 census, up from 1,832 in 2010. The city is in the southwest corner of Missouri, just north of the Arkansas border.

== History ==
A post office called Noel has been in operation since 1886. The community was named for Clark Wallace "C.W." and William Jasper "W.J." Noel; brothers, stockmen, and owners of a sawmill. The town was founded after the Kansas City, Pittsburg, and Gulf Railroad arrived.

Noel has capitalized on its Christmas-themed name, along with North Pole, Alaska, Christmas, Michigan, Santa Claus, Indiana, and Bethlehem, Pennsylvania. Each year, tens of thousands of Christmas cards and letters are sent to the USPS Noel Post Office during the holiday season to be stamped with a postmark reading, Noel, Mo. - "The Christmas City in the Ozark Vacation Land". This practice became popular in the late 1940s when Kate Smith, a radio and television singer, began telling the "Noel Story" during her broadcasts. Most of the year, area residents pronounce Noel as rhyming with "mole", in honor of the town's namesake, Bridges Noel.

On August 3, 1969, a freight train exploded while passing through Noel, spraying fragments of metal through houses and buildings over a six-block area. One person was killed, and 40 others injured.

On October 6, 1989, the Agofsky brothers robbed the State Bank of Noel and kidnapped the bank president Dan Short, in which he was later murdered by the brothers, 5 Days after the robbery, a fisherman discovered a piece of tape that was tied to the robbery and led to the arresting of the Agofsky brothers.

Noel was home to a Tyson Foods chicken-processing plant.

By 2010, an estimated 400 to 500 Somali refugees, and 60 and 70 Sudanese refugees, out of 1,800 residents, lived in the town, most of whom worked for Tyson Foods. In 2011, 130 Muslim employees stopped working temporarily after they were allegedly discouraged from praying five times a day for fear of low productivity. Tyson Foods later released a statement dismissing it as a cross-cultural misunderstanding.

A mosque was established in 2009, and an African grocery store which sells headscarves and rugs in 2010; both are located on Main Street. In 2017, the mayor, John Lafley, said that the Muslim refugees "want to practice their Sharia law here, and that's one thing the city won't tolerate." On December 28, 2020, an early morning fire broke out at the African grocery. It was destroyed. The fire spread to the adjacent mosque as well as other businesses. One person inside the store suffered extensive burns from which they died. A few days after the fire, the Islamic Society of Joplin launched a fundraising campaign to find a new home for the mosque. The goal was met, raising $100,480.

== Geography ==
Noel is in southwestern McDonald County, 3 miles (5 km) north of the Arkansas border. Missouri Route 90 passes through the city as its Main Street, leading east 13 miles (21 km) to Jane and west 8 miles (13 km) to Southwest City next to the Oklahoma border. Missouri Route 59 runs through the west side of Noel, briefly joining Route 90 near the center of town. Route 59 leads north 9 miles (14 km) to Anderson and south 5 miles (8 km) to Sulphur Springs, Arkansas.

According to the U.S. Census Bureau, Noel has a total area of 2.10 square miles (5.44 km^{2}), of which 2.03 square miles (5.26 km^{2}) are land and 0.08 square miles (0.21 km^{2}), or 3.62%, are water. The Elk River passes through the city, flowing northwest to join the Neosho River in Oklahoma and part of the Arkansas River watershed.

== Spring Valley ==
Spring Valley was formerly an unincorporated community along the south bank of the Elk River, just northwest of Noel. The community merged with the city of Noel on April 1, 1982.

== Demographics ==
Historical population
Census	Pop.	Note	%±
1920	324		—
1930	431		33.0%
1940	515		19.5%
1950	685		33.0%
1960	736		7.4%
1970	924		25.5%
1980	1,161		25.6%
1990	1,169		0.7%
2000	1,480		26.6%
2010	1,832		23.8%
2020	2,124		15.9%
U.S. Decennial Census

=== 2020 census ===
As of the 2020 census, there were 2,124 people in Noel.

There were 767 housing units, of which 10.4% were vacant. The homeowner vacancy rate was 3.2% and the rental vacancy rate was 6.5%.

0.0% of residents lived in urban areas, while 100.0% lived in rural areas.

There were 687 households, of which 44.7% had children under the age of 18 living in them. Of all households, 37.8% were married-couple households, 25.2% were households with a male householder and no spouse or partner present, and 28.4% were households with a female householder and no spouse or partner present. About 26.0% of all households were made up of individuals and 9.4% had someone living alone who was 65 years of age or older. The average household size was 3.09.

The median age in the city was 30.8 years. 32.8% of residents were under the age of 18; 9.8% were from 18 to 24; 27.5% were from 25 to 44; 22.5% were from 45 to 64; and 7.5% were 65 years of age or older. The gender makeup of the city was 51.0% male and 49.0% female. For every 100 females, there were 104.2 males, and for every 100 females age 18 and over, there were 102.3 males age 18 and over.

Racial composition as of the 2020 census
Race	Number	Percent
White	663	31.2%
Black or African American	354	16.7%
American Indian and Alaska Native	57	2.7%
Asian	17	0.8%
Native Hawaiian and Other Pacific Islander	212	10.0%
Some other race	368	17.3%
Two or more races	453	21.3%
Hispanic or Latino (of any race)	882	41.5%

=== 2010 census ===
As of the census of 2010, there were 1,832 people, 616 households, and 428 families residing in the city. The population density was 916.0 inhabitants per square mile (353.7/km^{2}). There were 731 housing units at an average density of 365.5 per square mile (141.1/km^{2}). The racial makeup of the city was 56.6% White, 5.0% African American, 2.4% Native American, 0.1% Asian, 2.9% Pacific Islander, 29.4% from other races, and 3.5% from two or more races. Hispanic or Latino of any race were 49.7% of the population.

There were 616 households, of which 45.1% had children under the age of 18 living with them, 41.2% were married couples living together, 18.3% had a female householder with no husband present, 9.9% had a male householder with no wife present, and 30.5% were non-families. 22.4% of all households were made up of individuals, and 6.4% had someone living alone who was 65 years of age or older. The average household size was 2.97 and the average family size was 3.43.

The median age in the city was 28.5 years. 31.8% of residents were under the age of 18; 11.2% were between the ages of 18 and 24; 30% were from 25 to 44; 20% were from 45 to 64; and 6.9% were 65 years of age or older. The gender makeup of the city was 49.3% male and 50.7% female.

=== 2000 census ===
As of the census of 2000, there were 1,480 people, 566 households, and 354 families residing in the city. The population density was 739.7 inhabitants per square mile (285.6/km^{2}). There were 630 housing units at an average density of 314.9 per square mile (121.6/km^{2}). The racial makeup of the city was 71.42% White, 0.34% African American, 2.16% Native American, 0.07% Asian, 0.07% Pacific Islander, 22.97% from other races, and 2.97% from two or more races. Hispanic or Latino of any race were 36.49% of the population.

There were 566 households, out of which 31.8% had children under the age of 18 living with them, 44.9% were married couples living together, 10.8% had a female householder with no husband present, and 37.3% were non-families. 29.3% of all households were made up of individuals, and 9.2% had someone living alone who was 65 years of age or older. The average household size was 2.61 and the average family size was 3.25.

In the city the population was spread out, with 27.3% under the age of 18, 12.3% from 18 to 24, 28.5% from 25 to 44, 20.6% from 45 to 64, and 11.3% who were 65 years of age or older. The median age was 32 years. For every 100 females, there were 109.9 males. For every 100 females age 18 and over, there were 112.6 males.

The median income for a household in the city was $27,386, and the median income for a family was $32,159. Males had a median income of $18,819 versus $16,848 for females. The per capita income for the city was $11,166. About 15.4% of families and 21.0% of the population were below the poverty line, including 29.8% of those under age 18 and 13.8% of those age 65 or over.

== Education ==
Public education in Noel is administered by McDonald County R-1 School District.

Noel has a public library, the Noel Community Branch Library.

== See also ==
- List of cities in Missouri
- McDonald Territory
