= Pineville, Missouri =

City in Missouri, U.S.

- City
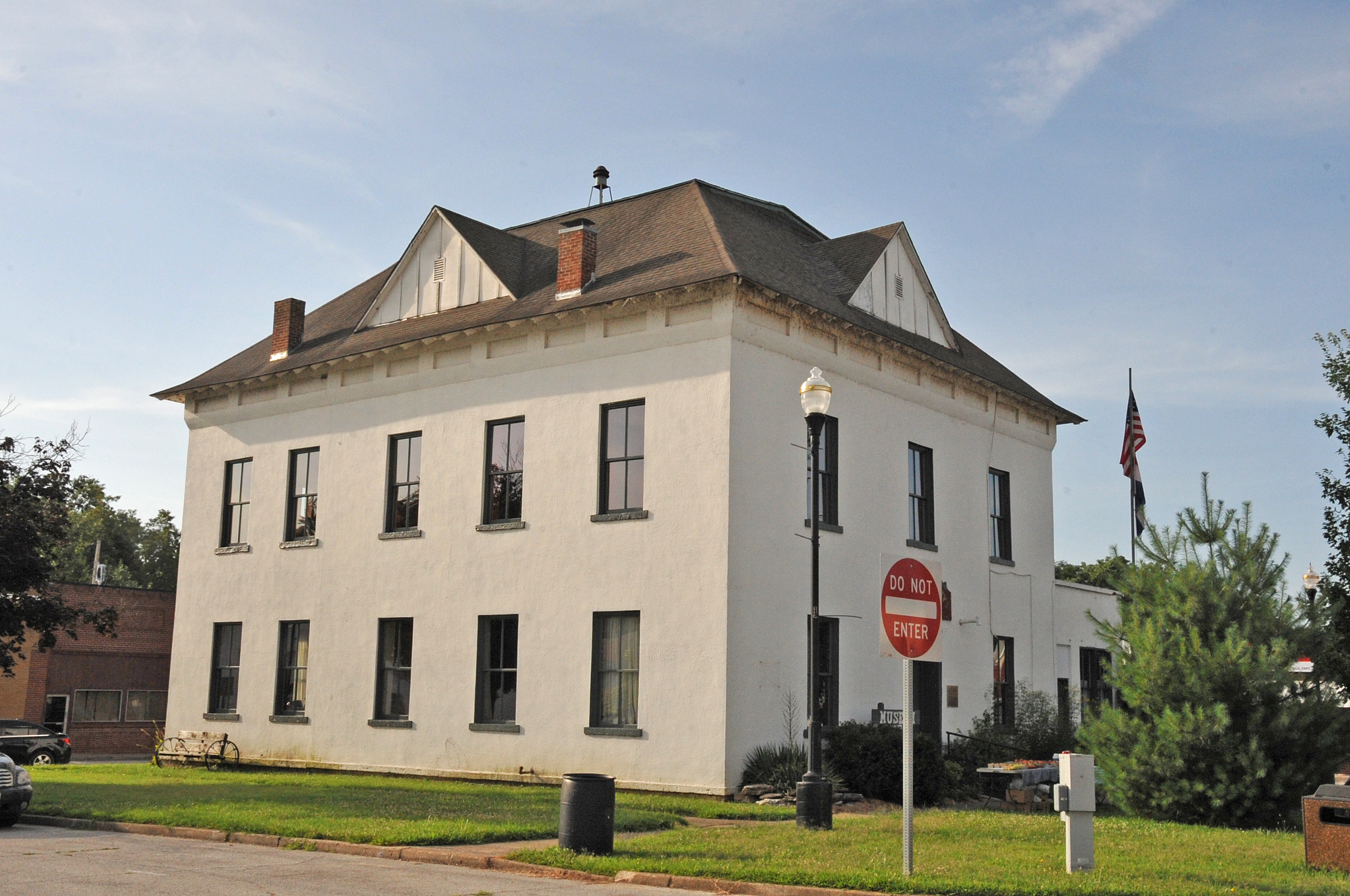
- The county's historic Old McDonald County Courthouse in Pineville, January 2009
- Nickname: The River City
- Location of Pineville, Missouri
- Coordinates: 36.575504°N 94.391543°W
- Country: United States
- State: Missouri
- County: McDonald
- Founded: 1847

Government
  - Mayor: Scott Dennis

Area
  - Total: 3.292 sq mi (8.526 km^{2})
  - Land: 3.292 sq mi (8.526 km^{2})
  - Water: 0 sq mi (0.000 km^{2})
- Elevation: 1,070 ft (326 m)

Population (2020)
  - Total: 802
  - Estimate (2023): 826
  - Density: 250.9/sq mi (96.87/km^{2})
- Time zone: UTC–6 (Central (CST))
  - Summer (DST): UTC–5 (CDT)
- ZIP Code: 64856
- Area code: 417
- FIPS code: 29-57818
- GNIS feature ID: 2396212
- Sales tax: 7.725%
- Website: pinevillemo.us

Pineville is a city in and the county seat of McDonald County, Missouri, United States. The population was 802 at the 2020 census, and was estimated to be 826 in 2023.

== History ==
Pineville was originally named Maryville, and was laid out under the latter name in 1847. The name was changed to "Pineville" in 1849 since another community already had the name of Maryville. Some say that Pineville was named for a grove of pine trees at the original town site, while others believe the name is a transfer from Pineville, Kentucky.

On August 17, 1897, Pineville was the site of a bank robbery which was one of the few at that time that involved a woman as an active participant in the actual robbery. Cora Hubbard, who was 20 at the time, John Sheets, a 23-year-old from Missouri, and 31-year-old Albert Whitfield "Whit" Tennison robbed the McDonald County Bank, stealing a total of $589.23 (equivalent to $22,803 in 2025). All three were soon captured and imprisoned.

Jesse James (1939) was filmed almost entirely in Pineville. The sequel Belle Starr (1941) was also filmed here.

The county's historic Old McDonald County Courthouse, which is operated as a museum by the McDonald County Historical Society, was named to the National Register of Historic Places on May 1, 2012.

== Geography ==
Pineville is in south-central McDonald County, located just north of the confluence of Big and Little Sugar Creeks, which forms the Elk River. Noel lies 8 miles (13 km) to the southwest, downstream on the Elk River, and Anderson lies about 6 miles (10 km) to the northwest, along U.S. Route 71. Interstate 49 passes west of the center of the city, with access from exits 5 and 7. I-49 leads north 20 miles (32 km) to Neosho and south 24 miles (39 km) to Bentonville, Arkansas.

According to the United States Census Bureau, the city has a total area of 3.292 square miles (8.53 km^{2}), all land. Big Sugar Creek forms part of the eastern border of the city, and the Elk River flows west across the city from its source at the confluence of Big and Little Sugar Creeks.

== Demographics ==
Historical population
Census	Pop.	Note	%±
1880	147		—
1890	192		30.6%
1920	359		—
1930	422		17.5%
1940	524		24.2%
1950	464		−11.5%
1960	454		−2.2%
1970	444		−2.2%
1980	504		13.5%
1990	580		15.1%
2000	768		32.4%
2010	791		3.0%
2020	802		1.4%
2023 (est.)	826		3.0%
U.S. Decennial Census; 2020 Census

As of the 2023 American Community Survey, there are 387 estimated households in Pineville with an average of 2.32 persons per household. The city has a median household income of $34,688. Approximately 18.5% of the city's population lives at or below the poverty line. Pineville has an estimated 52.8% employment rate, with 14.9% of the population holding a bachelor's degree or higher and 82.9% holding a high school diploma.

The top five reported ancestries (people were allowed to report up to two ancestries, thus the figures will generally add to more than 100%) were English (95.1%), Spanish (3.1%), Indo-European (0.0%), Asian and Pacific Islander (1.7%), and Other (0.0%).

The median age in the city was 40.2 years.

Pineville, Missouri – racial and ethnic composition Note: the US Census treats Hispanic/Latino as an ethnic category. This table excludes Latinos from the racial categories and assigns them to a separate category. Hispanics/Latinos may be of any race.
Race / ethnicity (NH = non-Hispanic)	Pop. 2000	Pop. 2010	Pop. 2020	% 2000	% 2010	% 2020
White alone (NH)	731	718	690	95.18%	90.77%	86.03%
Black or African American alone (NH)	0	1	8	0.00%	0.13%	1.00%
Native American or Alaska Native alone (NH)	19	36	22	2.47%	4.55%	2.74%
Asian alone (NH)	0	0	0	0.00%	0.00%	0.00%
Pacific Islander alone (NH)	0	0	2	0.00%	0.00%	0.25%
Other race alone (NH)	0	0	6	0.00%	0.00%	0.75%
Mixed race or multiracial (NH)	10	11	54	1.30%	1.39%	6.73%
Hispanic or Latino (any race)	8	25	20	1.04%	3.16%	2.49%
Total	768	791	802	100.00%	100.00%	100.00%

=== 2020 census ===
As of the 2020 census, there were 802 people, 311 households, and 202 families residing in the city. The population density was 243.62 inhabitants per square mile (94.1/km^{2}). There were 361 housing units at an average density of 109.66 per square mile (42.3/km^{2}). The racial makeup of the city was 86.28% White, 1.37% African American, 2.87% Native American, 0.00% Asian, 0.25% Pacific Islander, 1.50% from some other races and 7.73% from two or more races. Hispanic or Latino people of any race were 2.49% of the population.

=== 2010 census ===
As of the 2010 census, there were 791 people, 287 households, and 185 families residing in the city. The population density was 254.3 inhabitants per square mile (98.2/km^{2}). There were 357 housing units at an average density of 114.8 per square mile (44.3/km^{2}). The racial makeup of the city was 92.04% White, 0.13% African American, 4.68% Native American, 0.00% Asian, 0.00% Pacific Islander, 1.52% from some other races and 1.64% from two or more races. Hispanic or Latino people of any race were 3.16% of the population.

There were 287 households, of which 36.2% had children under the age of 18 living with them, 44.3% were married couples living together, 17.8% had a female householder with no husband present, 2.4% had a male householder with no wife present, and 35.5% were non-families. 31.4% of all households were made up of individuals, and 12.2% had someone living alone who was 65 years of age or older. The average household size was 2.63 and the average family size was 3.31.

The median age in the city was 33.8 years. 29.7% of residents were under the age of 18; 10.3% were between the ages of 18 and 24; 24.3% were from 25 to 44; 22.5% were from 45 to 64; and 13.1% were 65 years of age or older. The gender makeup of the city was 45.6% male and 54.4% female.

=== 2000 census ===
As of the 2000 census, there were 768 people, 309 households, and 207 families residing in the city. The population density was 1,094.0 inhabitants per square mile (422.4/km^{2}). There were 350 housing units at an average density of 498.6 per square mile (192.5/km^{2}). The racial makeup of the city was 95.70% White, 0.00% African American, 2.60% Native American, % Asian, 0.00% Pacific Islander, 0.39% from some other races and 1.30% from two or more races. Hispanic or Latino people of any race were 1.04% of the population.

There were 309 households, out of which 33.7% had children under the age of 18 living with them, 48.9% were married couples living together, 14.9% had a female householder with no husband present, and 33.0% were non-families. 29.1% of all households were made up of individuals, and 13.9% had someone living alone who was 65 years of age or older. The average household size was 2.41 and the average family size was 2.98.

In the city the population was spread out, with 27.3% under the age of 18, 9.4% from 18 to 24, 28.8% from 25 to 44, 19.4% from 45 to 64, and 15.1% who were 65 years of age or older. The median age was 34 years. For every 100 females, there were 86.9 males. For every 100 females age 18 and over, there were 83.6 males.

The median income for a household in the city was $24,886, and the median income for a family was $34,583. Males had a median income of $23,182 versus $20,515 for females. The per capita income for the city was $13,414. About 19.3% of families and 23.2% of the population were below the poverty line, including 30.8% of those under age 18 and 20.4% of those age 65 or over.

== Education ==
Public education in Pineville is administered by the McDonald County R-I School District.

Pineville has a public library, the McDonald County Library.

== See also ==
- List of cities in Missouri
