= Elk River (Oklahoma) =

River in Delaware County, Oklahoma and McDonald County, Missouri in the United States

Physical characteristics
- Source
  - location: Confluence of Big Sugar Creek and Little Sugar Creek near Pineville, Missouri
  - coordinates: 36°35′18″N 94°22′58″W
  - elevation: 860 ft (260 m)
- Mouth
  - location: Confluence with the Neosho River in Delaware County, Oklahoma
  - coordinates: 36°39′56″N 94°46′03″W
  - elevation: 741 ft (226 m)
- Length: 35 mi (56 km)
- Discharge
  - location: Tiff City
  - average: 821 cu ft/s (23.2 m^{3}/s)

Basin features
- Progression: Elk River → Neosho → Arkansas → Mississippi → Gulf of Mexico
- GNIS ID: 1092538

The Elk River is a 35.2-mile-long (56.6 km) tributary of the Neosho River in southwestern Missouri and northeastern Oklahoma in the United States. Its tributaries also drain a small portion of northwestern Arkansas. Via the Neosho and Arkansas rivers, the Elk is part of the Mississippi River watershed.

== Name ==
The river was said to have been named after elk in the area. However, it has also been reported that the name was originally Cowskin and was changed to Elk due to the influence of Steve Elkins, a local politician.

== Course ==
The Elk is formed by the confluence of Big Sugar Creek and Little Sugar Creek at Pineville, Missouri, and flows generally westward through McDonald County, Missouri, past the town of Noel, into Delaware County, Oklahoma, where it meets the Neosho River. Most of the river's course in Oklahoma is part of the Grand Lake o' the Cherokees, an impoundment formed by Pensacola Dam on the Neosho. The portion of the river between the confluence of Big and Little Sugar Creeks and the dam at Noel, Missouri is a popular route for recreational canoeing, kayaking, rafting, and tubing.

== See also ==
- List of rivers of Missouri
- List of rivers of Oklahoma
