= Anderson, Missouri =

City in McDonald County, Missouri, United States

- City
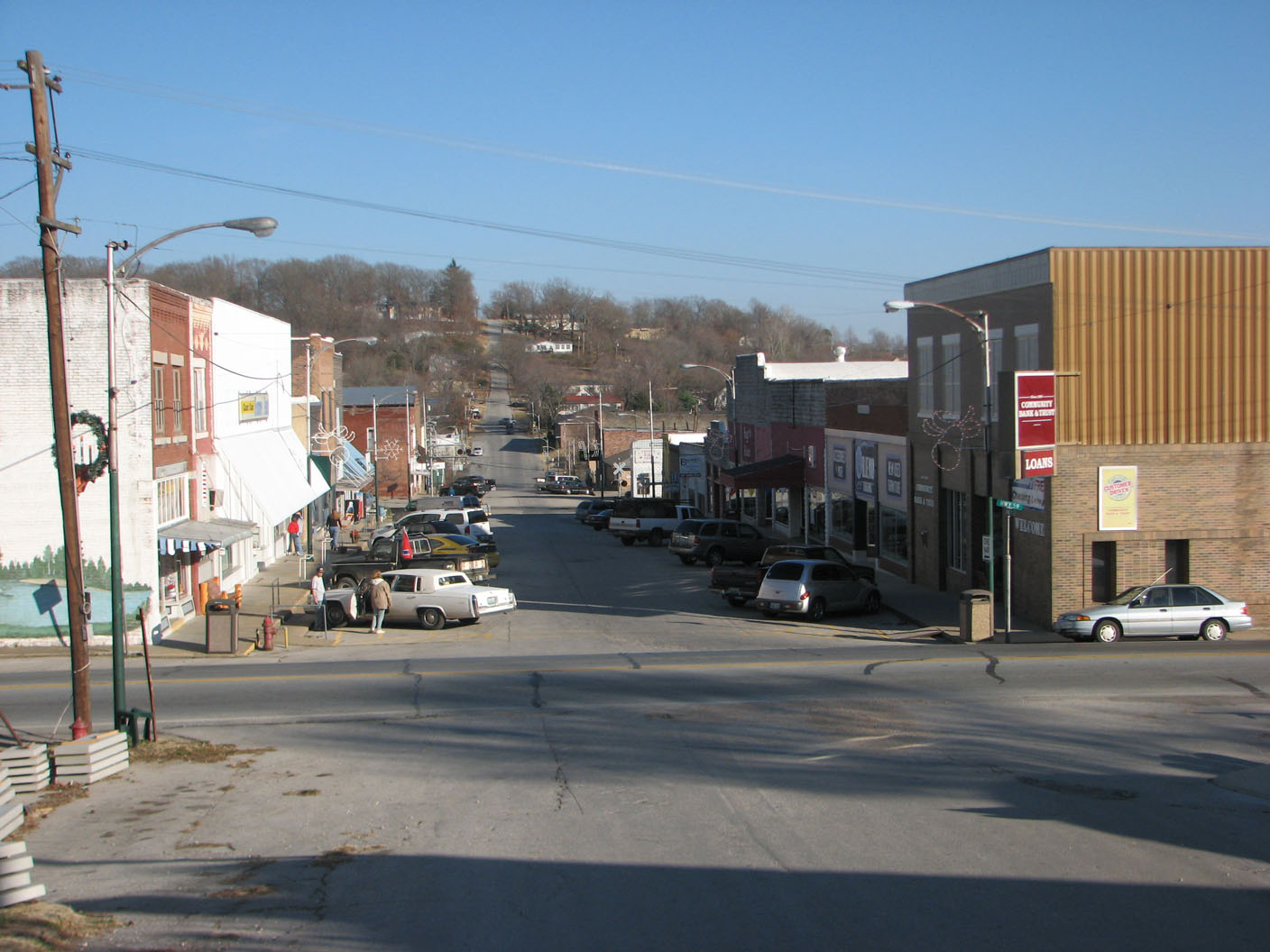
- Main Street in Anderson, November 2006

- Location in McDonald County and the state of Missouri
- Coordinates: 36°38′32″N 94°26′07″W
- Country: United States
- State: Missouri
- County: McDonald

Area
  - Total: 2.27 sq mi (5.89 km^{2})
  - Land: 2.27 sq mi (5.89 km^{2})
  - Water: 0 sq mi (0.00 km^{2})
- Elevation: 892 ft (272 m)

Population (2020)
  - Total: 1,981
  - Density: 871.5/sq mi (336.49/km^{2})
- Time zone: UTC-6 (Central (CST))
  - Summer (DST): UTC-5 (CDT)
- ZIP code: 64831
- Area code: 417
- FIPS code: 29-01198
- GNIS feature ID: 2393953
- Website: andersonmo.us

Anderson is a city in McDonald County, Missouri, United States. The population was 1,981 at the 2020 census.

== History ==
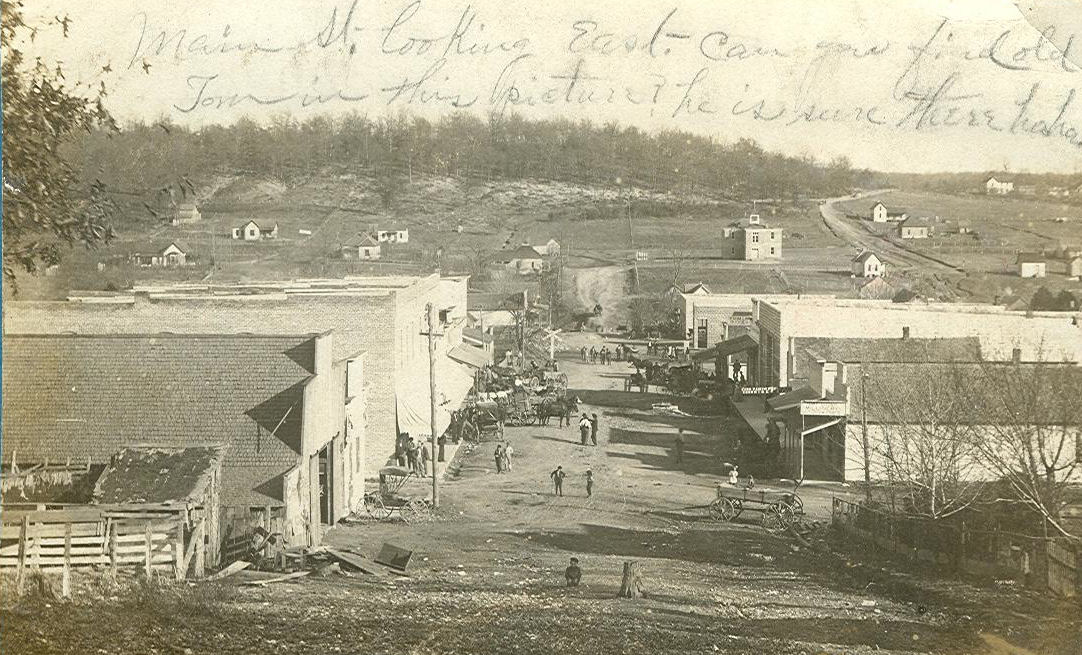
Main Street, Anderson, 1907

A post office called Anderson has been in operation since 1886. The community has the name of Robert Anderson, a local merchant.

== Demographics ==
Historical population
Census	Pop.	Note	%±
1910	721		—
1920	918		27.3%
1930	857		−6.6%
1940	938		9.5%
1950	1,073		14.4%
1960	992		−7.5%
1970	1,065		7.4%
1980	1,237		16.2%
1990	1,432		15.8%
2000	1,856		29.6%
2010	1,961		5.7%
2020	1,981		1.0%
U.S. Decennial Census

=== 2020 census ===
As of the 2020 census, Anderson had a population of 1,981. The median age was 35.7 years. 26.1% of residents were under the age of 18 and 15.6% of residents were 65 years of age or older. For every 100 females there were 95.8 males, and for every 100 females age 18 and over there were 92.1 males age 18 and over.

0.0% of residents lived in urban areas, while 100.0% lived in rural areas.

There were 728 households in Anderson, of which 37.6% had children under the age of 18 living in them. Of all households, 40.5% were married-couple households, 22.0% were households with a male householder and no spouse or partner present, and 27.2% were households with a female householder and no spouse or partner present. About 30.5% of all households were made up of individuals and 11.9% had someone living alone who was 65 years of age or older.

There were 822 housing units, of which 11.4% were vacant. The homeowner vacancy rate was 1.0% and the rental vacancy rate was 10.7%.

Racial composition as of the 2020 census
Race	Number	Percent
White	1,416	71.5%
Black or African American	11	0.6%
American Indian and Alaska Native	94	4.7%
Asian	16	0.8%
Native Hawaiian and Other Pacific Islander	126	6.4%
Some other race	109	5.5%
Two or more races	209	10.6%
Hispanic or Latino (of any race)	238	12.0%

=== 2010 census ===
As of the census of 2010, there were 1,961 people, 715 households, and 486 families living in the city. The population density was 951.9 inhabitants per square mile (367.5/km^{2}). There were 843 housing units at an average density of 409.2 per square mile (158.0/km^{2}). The racial makeup of the city was 85.8% White, 0.4% African American, 4.8% Native American, 0.6% Asian, 0.5% Pacific Islander, 4.9% from other races, and 2.9% from two or more races. Hispanic or Latino of any race were 9.7% of the population.

There were 715 households, of which 39.6% had children under the age of 18 living with them, 46.2% were married couples living together, 15.7% had a female householder with no husband present, 6.2% had a male householder with no wife present, and 32.0% were non-families. 27.7% of all households were made up of individuals, and 10.4% had someone living alone who was 65 years of age or older. The average household size was 2.62 and the average family size was 3.17.

The median age in the city was 34.3 years. 27% of residents were under the age of 18; 10.2% were between the ages of 18 and 24; 25.5% were from 25 to 44; 22.2% were from 45 to 64; and 15.2% were 65 years of age or older. The gender makeup of the city was 49.0% male and 51.0% female.

=== 2000 census ===
As of the census of 2000, there were 1,856 people, 712 households, and 462 families living in the city. The population density was 965.4 inhabitants per square mile (372.7/km^{2}). There were 781 housing units at an average density of 406.2 per square mile (156.8/km^{2}). The racial makeup of the city was 90.68% White, 0.59% African American, 3.50% Native American, 0.16% Asian, 0.11% Pacific Islander, 1.94% from other races, and 3.02% from two or more races. Hispanic or Latino of any race were 3.45% of the population.

There were 712 households, out of which 34.3% had children under the age of 18 living with them, 46.3% were married couples living together, 14.6% had a female householder with no husband present, and 35.1% were non-families. 30.5% of all households were made up of individuals, and 14.2% had someone living alone who was 65 years of age or older. The average household size was 2.47 and the average family size was 3.05.

In the city the population was spread out, with 27.2% under the age of 18, 9.8% from 18 to 24, 26.5% from 25 to 44, 19.7% from 45 to 64, and 16.9% who were 65 years of age or older. The median age was 35 years. For every 100 females, there were 88.2 males. For every 100 females age 18 and over, there were 81.2 males.

The median income for a household in the city was $23,966, and the median income for a family was $31,406. Males had a median income of $24,018 versus $17,679 for females. The per capita income for the city was $12,967. About 21.5% of families and 25.1% of the population were below the poverty line, including 35.8% of those under age 18 and 22.1% of those age 65 or over.

== Geography ==
Anderson is in west-central McDonald County on Indian Creek at the intersection of Missouri Routes 59 and 76 and U.S. Route 71. Interstate 49 passes just to the east of the city, with access from Exit 10 (MO 76). Neosho is 16 miles (26 km) to the north, and Bentonville, Arkansas, is 26 miles (42 km) to the southeast. Pineville, the McDonald county seat, is 6 miles (10 km) to the south.

According to the U.S. Census Bureau, Anderson has a total area of 2.27 square miles (5.88 km^{2}), all land. Indian Creek, which forms part of the southern boundary of the city, flows generally southward to join the Elk River, which in turn flows west to the Neosho River in Oklahoma.

=== Climate ===
Climate data for Anderson, Missouri (1991–2020)
Month	Jan	Feb	Mar	Apr	May	Jun	Jul	Aug	Sep	Oct	Nov	Dec	Year
Mean daily maximum °F (°C)	46.2 (7.9)	51.3 (10.7)	60.6 (15.9)	69.6 (20.9)	75.9 (24.4)	83.6 (28.7)	87.9 (31.1)	87.4 (30.8)	80.6 (27.0)	69.9 (21.1)	58.5 (14.7)	49.0 (9.4)	68.4 (20.2)
Daily mean °F (°C)	35.6 (2.0)	39.8 (4.3)	48.6 (9.2)	57.5 (14.2)	65.3 (18.5)	73.4 (23.0)	77.6 (25.3)	76.5 (24.7)	69.2 (20.7)	57.8 (14.3)	47.1 (8.4)	38.4 (3.6)	57.2 (14.0)
Mean daily minimum °F (°C)	25.0 (−3.9)	28.3 (−2.1)	36.7 (2.6)	45.5 (7.5)	54.7 (12.6)	63.2 (17.3)	67.3 (19.6)	65.6 (18.7)	57.8 (14.3)	45.7 (7.6)	35.7 (2.1)	27.8 (−2.3)	46.1 (7.8)
Average precipitation inches (mm)	1.89 (48)	2.03 (52)	3.68 (93)	4.70 (119)	6.01 (153)	4.97 (126)	3.57 (91)	3.73 (95)	4.30 (109)	3.22 (82)	3.69 (94)	2.54 (65)	44.33 (1,127)
Average snowfall inches (cm)	2.6 (6.6)	2.2 (5.6)	2.2 (5.6)	0.0 (0.0)	0.0 (0.0)	0.0 (0.0)	0.0 (0.0)	0.0 (0.0)	0.0 (0.0)	0.0 (0.0)	0.5 (1.3)	1.9 (4.8)	9.4 (23.9)
Source: NOAA

== Education ==
It is in the McDonald County R-I School District.

Anderson is home to McDonald County High School. The school mascot is the Mustang.

== Notable person ==
- Richard Corben (1940 – 2020), illustrator and comic book artist

== See also ==
- List of cities in Missouri
