= McDonald County, Missouri =

County in Missouri, United States

- County
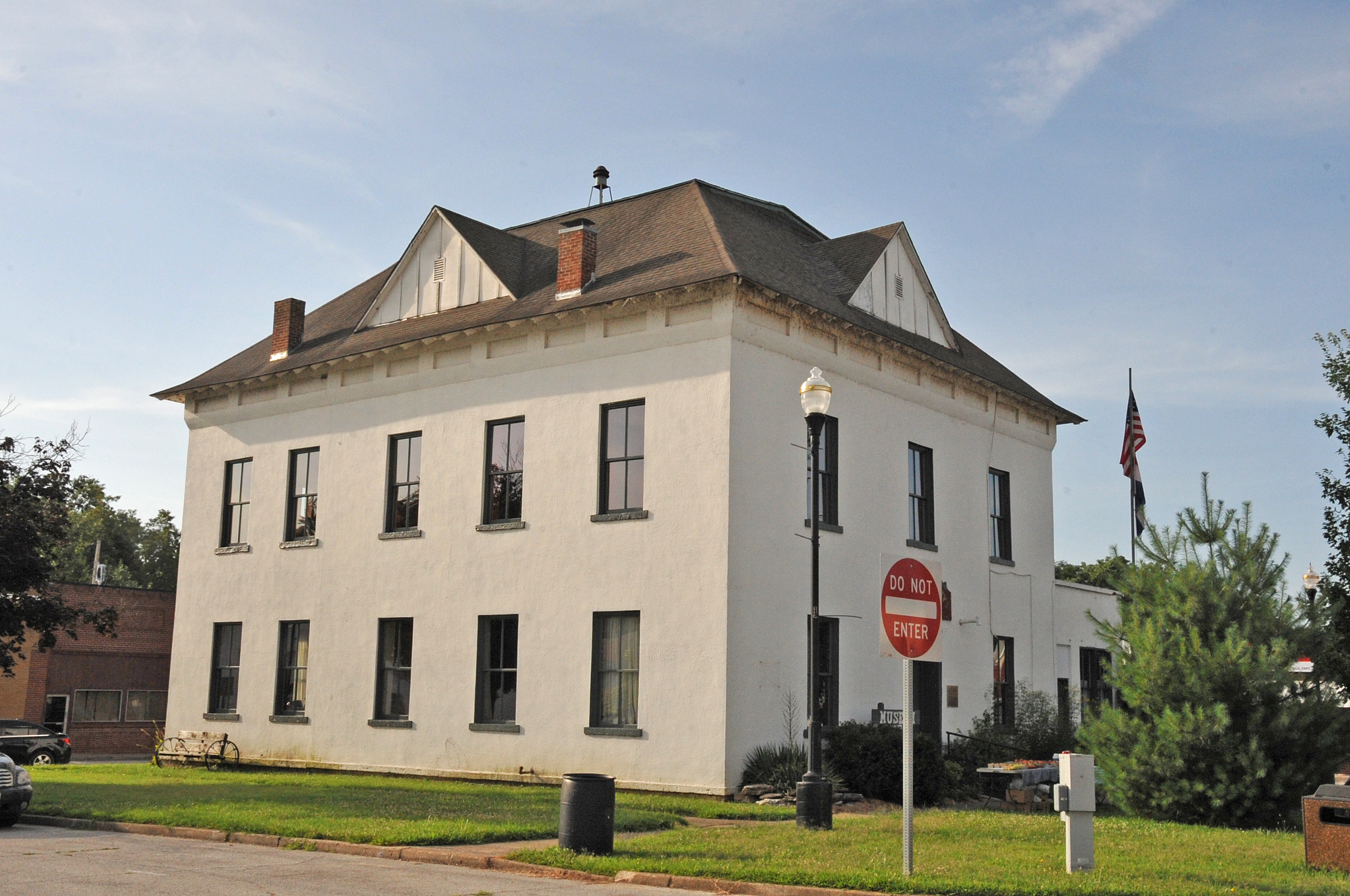
- The New McDonald County courthouse in Pineville The Old McDonald County Courthouse in Pineville

- Location within the U.S. state of Missouri
- Coordinates: 36.627955°N 94.343716°W
- Country: United States
- State: Missouri
- Founded: March 3, 1849
- Named for: Sergeant Alexander McDonald
- Seat: Pineville
- Largest city: Noel

Area
  - Total: 539.646 sq mi (1,397.68 km^{2})
  - Land: 539.445 sq mi (1,397.16 km^{2})
  - Water: 0.201 sq mi (0.52 km^{2}) 0.04%

Population (2020)
  - Total: 23,303
  - Estimate (2025): 23,992 ▲
  - Density: 44.599/sq mi (17.220/km^{2})
- Time zone: UTC−6 (Central)
  - Summer (DST): UTC−5 (CDT)
- Area code: 417
- Congressional district: 7th
- Website: mcdonaldcountymo.gov

McDonald County is a county located in the southwestern corner of the U.S. state of Missouri. As of the 2020 census, the population was 23,303 and was estimated to be 23,992 in 2025. Its county seat is Pineville.

== History ==
The county was organized in 1849 and named for Sergeant Alexander McDonald, a soldier in the American Revolutionary War. The county has three sites on the National Register of Historic Places, including the Old McDonald County Courthouse and the Powell Bridge.

== Geography ==
According to the United States Census Bureau, the county has a total area of 539.646 square miles (1,397.68 km^{2}), of which 539.445 square miles (1,397.16 km^{2}) is land and 0.201 square miles (0.52 km^{2}) (0.04%) is water. It is the 71st largest county in Missouri by total area.

=== Adjacent counties ===
- Newton County (north)
- Barry County (east)
- Benton County, Arkansas (south)
- Delaware County, Oklahoma (west)
- Ottawa County, Oklahoma (northwest)

=== Major highways ===
- I-49
- US 71
- Route 43
- Route 59
- Route 76
- Route 90

== Demographics ==
Historical population
Census	Pop.	Note	%±
1850	2,236		—
1860	4,008		79.2%
1870	3,756		−6.3%
1880	7,816		108.1%
1890	11,283		44.4%
1900	13,574		20.3%
1910	13,539		−0.3%
1920	12,690		−6.3%
1930	13,936		9.8%
1940	15,749		13.0%
1950	14,144		−10.2%
1960	11,798		−16.6%
1970	12,357		4.7%
1980	14,917		20.7%
1990	16,938		13.5%
2000	21,681		28.0%
2010	23,083		6.5%
2020	23,303		1.0%
2025 (est.)	23,992	▲	3.0%
U.S. Decennial Census; 1790–1960 1900–1990; 1990–2000 2010–2020

As of the fourth quarter of 2024, the median home value in McDonald County was $139,937.

=== American Community Survey (2023) ===
As of the 2023 American Community Survey, there are 8,512 estimated households in McDonald County with an average of 2.74 persons per household. The county has a median household income of $48,145. Approximately 18.2% of the county's population lives at or below the poverty line. McDonald County has an estimated 56.6% employment rate, with 13.4% of the population holding a bachelor's degree or higher and 81.3% holding a high school diploma.

The top five reported ancestries (people were allowed to report up to two ancestries, thus the figures will generally add to more than 100%) were English (85.1%), Spanish (9.0%), Indo-European (1.0%), Asian and Pacific Islander (3.6%), and Other (1.3%).

=== 2020 census ===
As of the 2020 census, the county had 23,303 people, 8,518 households, and 5,957 families; the population density was 43.2 inhabitants per square mile (16.7/km^{2}), and there were 9,760 housing units at an average density of 18.09 per square mile (7.0/km^{2}).

The median age was 37.8 years; 26.3% of residents were under the age of 18 and 14.7% of residents were 65 years of age or older. For every 100 females there were 102.7 males, and for every 100 females age 18 and over there were 100.5 males age 18 and over.

The racial makeup of the county was 73.4% White, 1.9% Black or African American, 2.5% American Indian and Alaska Native, 1.6% Asian, 3.7% Native Hawaiian and Pacific Islander, 6.5% from some other race, and 10.4% from two or more races. Hispanic or Latino residents of any race comprised 12.1% of the population.

0.1% of residents lived in urban areas, while 99.9% lived in rural areas.

There were 8,518 households in the county, of which 34.1% had children under the age of 18 living with them and 22.1% had a female householder with no spouse or partner present. About 24.7% of all households were made up of individuals and 10.6% had someone living alone who was 65 years of age or older.

Of those 9,760 housing units, 12.7% were vacant. Among occupied housing units, 69.8% were owner-occupied and 30.2% were renter-occupied. The homeowner vacancy rate was 1.8% and the rental vacancy rate was 9.4%.

=== Racial and ethnic composition ===
McDonald County, Missouri – Racial and ethnic composition Note: the US Census treats Hispanic/Latino as an ethnic category. This table excludes Latinos from the racial categories and assigns them to a separate category. Hispanics/Latinos may be of any race.
Race / Ethnicity (NH = Non-Hispanic)	Pop 1980	Pop 1990	Pop 2000	Pop 2010	Pop 2020	% 1980	% 1990	% 2000	% 2010	% 2020
White alone (NH)	14,584	16,230	18,348	18,700	16,667	97.77%	95.82%	84.63%	81.01%	71.52%
Black or African American alone (NH)	2	4	33	127	421	0.01%	0.02%	0.15%	0.55%	1.81%
Native American or Alaska Native alone (NH)	192	540	595	599	493	1.29%	3.19%	2.74%	2.59%	2.12%
Asian alone (NH)	15	40	27	186	376	0.10%	0.24%	0.12%	0.81%	1.61%
Native Hawaiian or Pacific Islander alone (NH)	x	x	29	255	868	x	x	0.13%	1.10%	3.72%
Other race alone (NH)	6	3	10	3	82	0.04%	0.02%	0.05%	0.01%	0.35%
Mixed race or Multiracial (NH)	x	x	609	626	1,578	x	x	2.81%	2.71%	6.77%
Hispanic or Latino (any race)	118	121	2,030	2,587	2,818	0.79%	0.71%	9.36%	11.21%	12.09%
Total	14,917	16,938	21,681	23,083	23,303	100.00%	100.00%	100.00%	100.00%	100.00%

=== 2023 estimate ===
As of the 2023 estimate, there were 23,903 people and 8,512 households residing in the county. There were 9,857 housing units at an average density of 18.27 per square mile (7.1/km^{2}). The racial makeup of the county was 84.5% White (74.0% NH White), 2.1% African American, 3.1% Native American, 1.8% Asian, 4.3% Pacific Islander, _% from some other races and 4.2% from two or more races. Hispanic or Latino people of any race were 12.4% of the population.

=== 2010 census ===
As of the 2010 census, there were 23,083 people, 8,404 households, and _ families residing in the county. The population density was 42.8 inhabitants per square mile (16.5/km^{2}). There were 9,925 housing units at an average density of 18.39 per square mile (7.1/km^{2}). The racial makeup of the county was 84.99% White, 0.58% African American, 2.87% Native American, 0.83% Asian, 1.12% Pacific Islander, 6.36% from some other races and 3.25% from two or more races. Hispanic or Latino people of any race were 11.21% of the population.

=== 2000 census ===
As of the 2000 census, there were 21,681 people, 8,113 households, and 5,865 families residing in the county. The population density was 40.0 inhabitants per square mile (15.4/km^{2}). There were 9,287 housing units at an average density of 17.0 per square mile (6.6/km^{2}). The racial makeup of the county was 89.66% White, 0.18% African American, 2.88% Native American, % Asian, 0.14% Pacific Islander, 3.70% from some other races and 3.30% from two or more races. Hispanic or Latino people of any race were 9.36% of the population.

In terms of ancestry, 28.0% were of American, 11.5% German, 10.5% Irish and 6.6% English.

There were 8,113 households, out of which 35.70% had children under the age of 18 living with them, 57.60% were married couples living together, 9.60% had a female householder with no husband present, and 27.70% were non-families. 23.30% of all households were made up of individuals, and 9.10% had someone living alone who was 65 years of age or older. The average household size was 2.65 and the average family size was 3.11.

In the county, the population was spread out, with 28.90% under the age of 18, 8.70% from 18 to 24, 28.60% from 25 to 44, 22.60% from 45 to 64, and 11.30% who were 65 years of age or older. The median age was 34 years. For every 100 females, there were 102.60 males. For every 100 females age 18 and over, there were 99.50 males.

The median income for a household in the county was $27,010, and the median income for a family was $31,530. Males had a median income of $23,434 versus $18,157 for females. The per capita income for the county was $13,175. About 15.60% of families and 20.70% of the population were below the poverty line, including 28.60% of those under age 18 and 17.20% of those age 65 or over.

== Education ==
=== Public schools ===
The majority of the county is in the McDonald County R–I School District. This district is headquartered in Anderson. Schools include:

- Noel Primary School (PK–02) – Noel
- Pineville Primary School (PK–02) – Pineville
- Anderson Elementary School (PK–05) – Anderson
- Noel Elementary School (03–08) – Noel
- Pineville Elementary School (03–08) – Pineville
- Rocky Comfort Elementary School (PK–08) – Rocky Comfort
- Southwest City Elementary School (PK–08) – Southwest City
- White Rock Elementary School (PK–08) – Jane
- Anderson Middle School (06–08) – Anderson
- McDonald County R-I High School (09–12) – Anderson

Other school districts cover small portions of the county. They are:

- East Newton County R-VI School District
- Neosho R-V School District
- Seneca R-VII School District
- Southwest R-V School District
- Wheaton R-III School District

=== History of McDonald County R-I School District ===
The present McDonald County R-I School District is the result of consolidations of several county school districts. The first two school districts to consolidate were the Pineville and Anderson school districts. This was the first step in what was a long-range plan to combine all of the remaining high schools in the county with the exception of the Goodman School District which would become a part of the Neosho school system. The plan for the Pineville–Anderson consolidation was approved and the state offered a $50,000 matching grant for the building of a new high school. If the remaining high schools were to have joined, an additional $200,000 in matching grants would have been recurred.

The first consolidated class from Pineville and Anderson was the Class of 1966. David Alumbaugh was a member of that class and remembers it was the class that elected the school mascot as the mustang and the school colors of red and black. There was not a new high school so each town maintained a high school faculty but all activities including athletics were combined. When asked what the mood of the people in Pineville was concerning the school consolidation, Alumbaugh said, "I don't remember it being a great deal; most people considered it inevitable it was going to happen sooner or later." It was something that could not be stopped, according to Larry Warner who taught during the first year (1966) at the Pineville campus and then at the new high school in Anderson its next year. "It was something that was really needed. The faculty at the old Pineville High School was not very good either at the end of their careers or just beginning. The kids got along fine at the new school but it was the parents who fought."

The next school district to consider joining Pineville and Anderson was the Noel School District. Noel Lawmen had a serious concern on where the new high school, which would serve all students, would be located. The proposed site was about a mile east of the city of Anderson at the junction of Highway 76 and then new Highway 71. The Noel patrons wanted a site closer to the center of the county which would be just north of the Indian River Bridge at the city of Lanagan. The Noel School Board sent a letter to the Missouri Department of Elementary & Secondary Education calling for a vote of the people of McDonald County on the site but this didn't happen. The reasoning for there not being a countywide vote couldn't be found, but the proposed new high school site had already been approved by the Missouri Department of Education.

Once a school district was asked to be included in the reorganized district the people of the district asked to be included and the people of the reorganized district both voted. What this meant was that the people of Pineville and Anderson could vote in other districts even if that other district's patrons didn't want to come into the reorganized district, they had to. This led to many of the hard feelings that last even today in McDonald County about the school consolidation. With the addition of Noel to the reorganization there were only the high schools of Goodman, Rocky Comfort and Southwest City left. The school district of Goodman decided to join the school district of Neosho. This left Southwest City with its school population of 89 and Rocky Comfort with its high school population of 107 as the only other two schools left in the county. Southwest City, located only miles from the Arkansas and Oklahoma borders, had no other choice. There were no Missouri schools close to it so it asked and was voted into the reorganized plan. Rocky Comfort is located on the eastern edge of McDonald County and would have been much closer to reorganize with the town of Wheaton in Barry County. Rocky Comfort ended up joining the reorganization of the McDonald County schools.

=== Public libraries ===
- McDonald County Library

== Communities ==
=== Cities and Towns ===
- Anderson
- Ginger Blue
- Goodman
- Jane
- Lanagan
- Noel
- Pineville (county seat)
- Southwest City

=== Census-designated place ===
- Rocky Comfort

=== Unincorporated communities ===
- Arnett
- Bethpage
- Caverna
- Cove
- Coy
- Cyclone
- Erie
- Hart
- Havenhurst
- Jacket
- Longview
- May
- McNatt
- Pack
- Powell
- Simcoe
- Splitlog
- Tiff City

== Politics ==
=== Local ===
The Republican Party predominantly controls politics at the local level in McDonald County. Republicans hold all but one of the elected positions in the county.

McDonald County, Missouri

Elected countywide officials
Assessor	Sue Ann Stokes	Republican
Circuit Clerk	Tanya Lewis	Republican
County Clerk	Kimberly Bell	Republican
Collector	Brenda Gordon	Republican
Commissioner (presiding)	Bryan Hall	Republican
Commissioner (district 1)	Jamey Cope	Republican
Commissioner (district 2)	Rick Lett	Republican
Coroner	BJ Goodwin	Republican
Prosecuting Attorney	Maleia Cheney	Republican
Public Administrator	Tonya Garvin	Republican
Recorder	Michelle Barker	Republican
Sheriff	Robert Evenson	Republican
Surveyor	Travis Green	Republican
Treasurer	Joye Helm	Republican

=== State ===
Past Gubernatorial Elections Results
Year	Republican	Democratic	Third Parties
2024	83.25% 7,668	14.42% 1,328	2.34% 215
2020	81.69% 7,325	16.04% 1,438	2.27% 204
2016	72.55% 5,915	22.73% 1,853	4.72% 385
2012	62.26% 4,823	33.10% 2,564	4.64% 359
2008	59.74% 4,766	36.63% 2,922	3.63% 290
2004	73.36% 5,622	24.71% 1,894	1.94% 148
2000	64.92% 4,216	32.14% 2,087	2.94% 191
1996	54.46% 3,297	41.89% 2,536	3.65% 221

All of McDonald County is a part of Missouri's 159th district in the Missouri House of Representatives and is represented by Bill Lant (R-Pineville).

Missouri House of Representatives — District 159 — McDonald County (2016)
Party	Candidate	Votes	%	±%
Republican	Bill Lant	7,290	100.00%	

Missouri House of Representatives — District 159 — McDonald County (2014)
Party	Candidate	Votes	%	±%
Republican	Bill Lant	3,346	100.00%	

Missouri House of Representatives — District 159 — McDonald County (2012)
Party	Candidate	Votes	%	±%
Republican	Bill Lant	6,621	100.00%	

All of McDonald County is a part of Missouri's 29th District and is currently represented in the Missouri Senate by David Sater (R-Cassville).

Missouri Senate — District 29 — McDonald County (2016)
Party	Candidate	Votes	%	±%
Republican	David Sater	7,176	100.00%	

Missouri Senate — District 29 — McDonald County (2012)
Party	Candidate	Votes	%	±%
Republican	David Sater	6,575	100.00%	

=== Federal ===
U.S. Senate — Missouri — McDonald County (2016)
Party	Candidate	Votes	%	±%
Republican	Roy Blunt	5,812	71.10%	+11.12
Democratic	Jason Kander	1,793	21.94%	−12.04
Libertarian	Jonathan Dine	258	3.16%	−2.88
Constitution	Fred Ryman	170	2.08%	+2.08
Green	Johnathan McFarland	141	1.72%	+1.72

U.S. Senate — Missouri — McDonald County (2012)
Party	Candidate	Votes	%	±%
Republican	Todd Akin	4,667	59.98%	
Democratic	Claire McCaskill	2,644	33.98%	
Libertarian	Jonathan Dine	470	6.04%	

All of McDonald County is included in Missouri's 7th congressional district and is represented by Billy Long (R-Springfield) in the U.S. House of Representatives.

U.S. House of Representatives — Missouri's 7th Congressional District — McDonald County (2016)
Party	Candidate	Votes	%	±%
Republican	Billy Long	6,271	77.92%	+0.42
Democratic	Genevieve Williams	1,428	17.74%	−0.14
Libertarian	Benjamin T. Brixey	349	4.34%	−0.28

U.S. House of Representatives — Missouri's 7th Congressional District — McDonald County (2014)
Party	Candidate	Votes	%	±%
Republican	Billy Long	2,970	77.50%	+6.96
Democratic	Jim Evans	685	17.88%	−6.89
Libertarian	Kevin Craig	177	4.62%	−0.07

U.S. House of Representatives — Missouri's 7th Congressional District — McDonald County (2012)
Party	Candidate	Votes	%	±%
Republican	Billy Long	5,363	70.54%	
Democratic	Jim Evans	1,883	24.77%	
Libertarian	Kevin Craig	357	4.69%	

==== Political culture ====
United States presidential election results for McDonald County, Missouri
Year	Republican		Democratic		Third party(ies)	
Year	No.	%	No.	%	No.	%
1888	802	37.99%	1,069	50.64%	240	11.37%
1892	835	37.95%	1,026	46.64%	339	15.41%
1896	998	37.14%	1,676	62.37%	13	0.48%
1900	1,138	42.40%	1,469	54.73%	77	2.87%
1904	1,266	47.15%	1,269	47.26%	150	5.59%
1908	1,333	48.49%	1,306	47.51%	110	4.00%
1912	916	31.82%	1,326	46.06%	637	22.13%
1916	1,414	44.59%	1,631	51.43%	126	3.97%
1920	2,921	55.21%	2,242	42.37%	128	2.42%
1924	2,374	48.29%	2,301	46.81%	241	4.90%
1928	3,684	64.79%	1,986	34.93%	16	0.28%
1932	2,464	38.11%	3,943	60.99%	58	0.90%
1936	3,312	48.57%	3,503	51.37%	4	0.06%
1940	4,063	54.95%	3,312	44.79%	19	0.26%
1944	3,520	58.12%	2,523	41.66%	13	0.21%
1948	2,979	50.36%	2,925	49.45%	11	0.19%
1952	4,121	61.90%	2,525	37.93%	11	0.17%
1956	3,646	56.94%	2,757	43.06%	0	0.00%
1960	3,955	61.31%	2,496	38.69%	0	0.00%
1964	3,055	46.69%	3,488	53.31%	0	0.00%
1968	3,025	51.32%	2,188	37.12%	681	11.55%
1972	4,339	70.83%	1,787	29.17%	0	0.00%
1976	2,949	48.28%	3,111	50.93%	48	0.79%
1980	4,114	60.65%	2,485	36.64%	184	2.71%
1984	4,521	68.19%	2,109	31.81%	0	0.00%
1988	3,812	61.95%	2,299	37.36%	42	0.68%
1992	3,010	43.78%	2,281	33.18%	1,584	23.04%
1996	3,008	50.36%	1,980	33.15%	985	16.49%
2000	4,460	68.31%	1,866	28.58%	203	3.11%
2004	5,443	70.46%	2,215	28.67%	67	0.87%
2008	5,499	67.60%	2,454	30.17%	182	2.24%
2012	5,694	72.84%	1,920	24.56%	203	2.60%
2016	6,599	79.49%	1,329	16.01%	374	4.50%
2020	7,465	82.46%	1,439	15.90%	149	1.65%
2024	7,843	83.99%	1,423	15.24%	72	0.77%

Like most counties situated in Southwest Missouri, McDonald County is a Republican stronghold in presidential elections. George W. Bush carried McDonald County in 2000 and 2004 by more than two-to-one margins, and like many other rural and exurban counties throughout Missouri, McDonald County strongly favored John McCain over Barack Obama in 2008. Despite the strength of Republicans at the presidential level here, Democrat Jimmy Carter did manage to carry McDonald County in 1976, making it the only county in Southwest Missouri to have been won by any Democrat in the past 50 years.

Like most areas throughout the Bible Belt in Southwest Missouri, voters in McDonald County traditionally adhere to socially and culturally conservative principles which tend to strongly influence their Republican leanings. In 2004, Missourians voted on a constitutional amendment to define marriage as the union between a man and a woman—it overwhelmingly passed McDonald County with 84.42 percent of the vote. The initiative passed the state with 71 percent of support from voters as Missouri became the first state to ban same-sex marriage. In 2006, Missourians voted on a constitutional amendment to fund and legalize embryonic stem cell research in the state—it failed in McDonald County with 57.02 percent voting against the measure. The initiative narrowly passed the state with 51 percent of support from voters as Missouri became one of the first states in the nation to approve embryonic stem cell research. Despite McDonald County's longstanding tradition of supporting socially conservative platforms, voters in the county have a penchant for advancing populist causes like increasing the minimum wage. In 2006, Missourians voted on a proposition (Proposition B) to increase the minimum wage in the state to $6.50 an hour—it passed McDonald County with 76.37 percent of the vote. The proposition strongly passed every single county in Missouri with 78.99 percent voting in favor as the minimum wage was increased to $6.50 an hour in the state. During the same election, voters in five other states also strongly approved increases in the minimum wage.

=== Missouri presidential preference primary (2008) ===
Former Governor Mike Huckabee (R-Arkansas) received more votes, a total of 1,285, than any candidate from either party in McDonald County during the 2008 Missouri Presidential Primaries.

== See also ==
- McDonald Territory
- National Register of Historic Places listings in McDonald County, Missouri
