= McDowell Township, Barry County, Missouri =

McDowell Township
- Township
- Coordinates: 36°49′31″N 093°47′52″W
- Country: United States
- State: Missouri
- County: Barry

Area
  - Total: 23.85 sq mi (61.78 km^{2})
  - Land: 23.85 sq mi (61.78 km^{2})
  - Water: 0 sq mi (0 km^{2}) 0%
- Elevation: 1,296 ft (395 m)

Population (2000)
  - Total: 275
  - Density: 12/sq mi (4.5/km^{2})
- FIPS code: 29-44966
- GNIS feature ID: 0766260

McDowell Township is one of twenty-five townships in Barry County, Missouri, United States. In the 1890s, McDowell mined and extracted lead and jack ore. As of the 2000 census, its population was 275.

== Geography ==
McDowell Township covers an area of 23.85 square miles (61.8 km^{2}) and contains no incorporated settlements.

The streams of Brights Spring, Calton Creek, Gunter Creek, Little Flat Creek, Stansberry Creek and Willow Branch run through this township.
