= Wheaton Township =

Wheaton Township may refer to:

- Wheaton Township, Barry County, Missouri
- Wheaton Township, Bottineau County, North Dakota

== See also ==
- Wheaton (disambiguation)
