= Missouri Route 97 =

State highway in Missouri, U.S.

Route 97
- Route 97 highlighted in red

Route information
- Maintained by MoDOT
- Length: 76.898 mi (123.755 km)

Major junctions
- South end: Route 86 north of Wheaton
- US 60 west of Monett; I-44 west of Mount Vernon; US 160 in Lockwood
- North end: Route 32 south of El Dorado Springs

Location
- Country: United States
- State: Missouri

Highway system
- Missouri State Highway System; Interstate; US; State; Supplemental
← Route 96	→ Route 98

Route 97 is a highway in southwest Missouri. Its northern terminus is at Route 32 eight miles (13 km) south of El Dorado Springs; its southern terminus is at Route 86, four miles north of Wheaton.

== Route description ==
Route 97 starts at a curve of Route 32, 8 miles south of El Dorado Springs. Runs south for 8 miles, where State Hwy B joins it for a 2-mile stretch to the western edge of Jerico Springs. On the western side of Jerico Springs, the road turns to the east. In downtown Jerico Springs, Hwy B continues straight; while 97 turns to the south. 3 miles south of Jerico Springs, at the junction of State Hwy D, 97 turns east for a few miles, before turning back south to Lockwood. At Lockwood, 97 intersects US Route 160. It then crosses the BNSF railroad Fort Scott sub in downtown Lockwood; then runs south for 14 miles to a junction with Missouri Route 96. After crossing 96, it crosses Spring River & the Missouri & North Arkansas railroad, just north of Stotts City. It then passes through Stotts City; then 2 miles south of Stotts City; it crosses I-44 at exit 38; then it turns west on the old US Route 166 roadbed for 2 miles, before turning left (south) to go to Pierce City. In Pierce City, it shares a 2 block stretch of Missouri Route 37; then turns south & crosses the BNSF Cherokee Sub. Two miles south of Pierce City, it intersects US Route 60 at Yonkerville; also the home of the Monett Municipal Airport. Route 97 runs south for 7 miles, passing the unincorporated community of Pulaskifield. South of Pulaskifield, it intersects State Route B, then turns west for 2 miles to its southern terminus at Missouri Route 86; four miles north of Wheaton.

== Major intersections ==
County	Location	mi	km	Destinations	Notes
Barry	Pioneer Township	0.000	0.000	Route 86 – Fairview, Wheaton	
Barry	Monett	9.406	15.137	US 60 – Monett, Granby	
Lawrence	Pierce City	11.523	18.544	Route 37 north – Wentworth	Southern end of Route 37 overlap
Lawrence	Pierce City	11.677	18.792	Route 37 south – Monett	Northern end of Route 37 overlap
Lawrence	Mount Pleasant–Vineyard township line	23.148	37.253	I-44 – Springfield, Joplin	exit 38 on I-44
Lawrence	Green Township	31.148	50.128	Route 96 – Phelps, Avilla	
Dade	Lockwood	45.229	72.789	US 160 – Greenfield, Golden City	
Cedar	Box Township	76.898	123.755	Route 32 – El Dorado Springs, Stockton	
1.000 mi = 1.609 km; 1.000 km = 0.621 mi: Concurrency terminus
