= Pogue Creek =

Stream in the American state of Missouri

Pogue Creek or Pogues Creek is a small stream in west-central Barry County, Missouri. Pogue Creek starts just south of Butterfield and it flows west under Missouri Route 37 and on past Burtonville to join Shoal Creek east of Wheaton.

The stream headwaters are at 36°45′14″N 93°54′42″W and the confluence with Shoal Creek is at 36°45′49″N 94°00′56″W.

Pogue Creek has the name of Marion Pogue, a settler.

== See also ==
- List of rivers of Missouri
