= Crane Creek Township =

Crane Creek Township may refer to the following townships in the United States:

- Crane Creek Township, Mason County, Illinois
- Crane Creek Township, Barry County, Missouri
