= Jenkins Township =

Jenkins Township may refer to the following townships in the United States:

- Jenkins Township, Mitchell County, Iowa
- Jenkins Township, Crow Wing County, Minnesota
- Jenkins Township, Barry County, Missouri
- Jenkins Township, Luzerne County, Pennsylvania
