= Wes Wilson =

American artist (1937–2020)

- Born: Robert Wesley Wilson; July 15, 1937; Sacramento, California, U.S.
- Died: January 24, 2020 (aged 82); Leann, Missouri, U.S.
- Known for: Psychedelic art, Poster art, Painting
- Movement: Psychedelic art

Robert Wesley Wilson (July 15, 1937 – January 24, 2020) was an American artist and one of the leading designers of psychedelic posters. Best known for designing posters for Bill Graham of The Fillmore in San Francisco, he invented a style that is now synonymous with the peace movement, the psychedelic era and the 1960s. In particular, he was known for inventing and popularizing a "psychedelic" font around 1966 that made the letters look like they were moving or melting.

His style was heavily influenced by the Art Nouveau movement. Wilson was considered to be one of "The Big Five" San Francisco poster artists, along with Alton Kelley, Victor Moscoso, Rick Griffin, and Stanley Mouse.

== Early life and education ==
Robert Wesley Wilson was born on July 15, 1937, in Sacramento, California. He was raised in rural northern California by his mother. He had a stint in the military after graduating high school. Moving to San Francisco, he put himself through college by working at a small printing press. Attending San Francisco State College to study philosophy and religion, he later dropped out to support his young family.

== Career ==
=== First publishing company ===
Early in his career in San Francisco, he lived in the Wently apartment complex with other artists such as Bob Carr, with Wilson and Carr forming a printing business together. Both of them developed their skill at creating flyers for performing groups. Wilson and his wife also began interacting with local artists at parties and dances, including Janis Joplin and Jerry Garcia. According to Wilson about the 1960s hippie scene in San Francisco, "It was a time of enlightenment. In the '60s, we used to think of Utopia as something that was really going to happen."

His first major poster of note, which announced The Association among other groups, "features shimmering red flame-like lettering on a green background." Wilson became "particularly noted for the lettering style he launched," which Wilson created to catch the eye and be "something people had to stop to figure out." He was inspired by the block lettering of Alfred Roller, in particular "how it filled the space and resculpted the style to make it his own," with Wilson making it his signature style and other artists following suit. He also became known for the "earthy, sensual women he drew."

=== Psychedelic poster craze ===
In the middle 1960s, the Haight-Ashbury movement increased the demand for posters and handbills in the San Francisco area, and Wilson began taking commissions. In 1965, he published his first poster "Are We Next?" The Vietnam War protest poster was designed, self-printed, and sold by Wilson and portrayed a swastika imprinted with an American flag design. Said Wilson, "I just put it out there to stir people up to thinking about things." The poster caught the attention of rock promoter Chet Helms, who commissioned Wilson to design handbills for Family Dog.

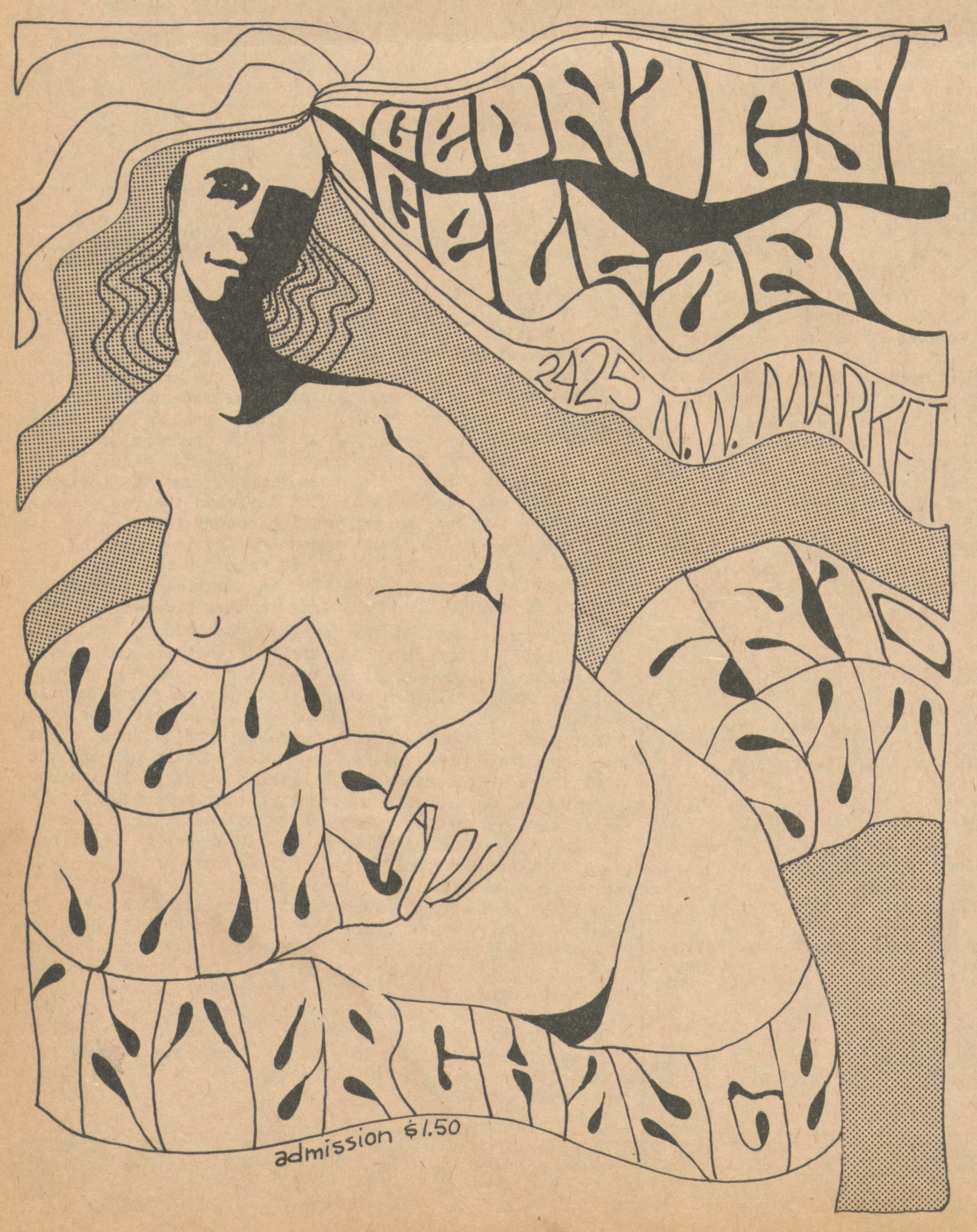
New Blues Interchange at Cedric's Cellar, 1967

By early 1966, Wilson had started making posters for both Helms and Bill Graham, both of whom were producing weekly dances, Helms' at the Avalon Ballroom and Graham's at the Fillmore Auditorium and Fillmore West. Inspired in part by the dances, "Wilson, and the artists who followed, attempted to capture that intensity in graphic form. The posters became so popular, people were tearing them down as quickly as they went up. Soon, they were being reprinted for sale. Poster shops sprang up locally and nationwide." He created iconic posters for Jefferson Airplane, Otis Redding, and the Grateful Dead, and in 1966 he made the poster for a Fillmore performance by the Plastic Inevitable. Other posters he designed were local bands such as the Quicksilver Messenger Service. For the final Beatles concert at Candlestick Park on August 29, 1966, Wilson was the poster designer.

He amicably stopped working with Helms in the 1960s, with Wilson feeling "stifled" by the promoter saying his art was "too far out" at the time. Several months later, Wilson had begun working exclusively for Graham, an arrangement which ended in 1967 over a contract dispute. One of Wilson's Grateful Dead posters was used on the cover of Life in September 1967, with the magazine quoting him in an article on "the national poster craze." He received a National Endowment for the Arts award in 1968.

=== Later career ===
In the 1970s he moved to a farm south of Aurora, Missouri, where he painted up until his death. Wilson was covered in the 1985 art book The Art of Rock, creating its original cover as well. He was later written about in the Art of Engagement by Peter Selz. KY3's Ed Fillmer traveled to Wilson's farm in 1989, setting up an exhibition of Wilson's work at the Springfield Art Museum. In the 1990s, Wilson co-produced three successful rock art exposition in California.

On May 27, 2006, the Keyes Gallery displayed his work for groups such as the Doors, the Grateful Dead, Jefferson Airplane, Sopwith Camel, and The Grass Roots. By 2006, his posters had also been exhibited at the Louvre, the National Museum of American Art in Washington, D.C., and the San Francisco Museum of Modern Art and others. By the end of his career, Wilson's concert posters had been collected by a number of art and history museums, among them the Smithsonian, the Metropolitan Museum of Art, and the Museum of Modern Art. He continued working on posters as he grew older, and in 2019 he created poster art for the band Moonalice in Northern California.

== Style and impact ==
According to the News-Leader in 2006, "historians, journalists and fellow artists credit Wilson with launching an entire art movement — and the fluid block lettering style that became synonymous with the '60s — as the father of the psychedelic rock concert poster. Today his posters are coveted among collectors, bringing hundreds, sometimes thousands of dollars." He experimented with fonts and colors to make it seem as if the letters were themselves moving, helping "usher in an entirely new art style of psychedelia," along with artists such as Stanley Mouse, Alton Kelley, Victor Moscoso, and Rick Griffin.

Wilson was called the "founder of the hippie poster movement" by the Chicago Tribune. He was also described as the most "widely known poster artist" in the United States at one point by The Daily Californian. He "became one of San Francisco's most well-known artists during the hippie movement of the 1960s. The celebrated psychedelic rock poster artist was a significant contributor to the Haight-Asbury scene." According to author Eric King, Wilson's posters are among the most collectible from the psychedelic poster scene, with an early first run poster by Wilson for the Tribal Stomp even selling for $16,500 in 2005.

== Personal life ==
Wilson and his first wife have three daughters together. He met his second wife, Eva, in San Francisco in the 1960s at the Wently apartment complex for artists. In 1976, the couple headed to the Ozarks, where they raised their three children on a former dairy farm. He died of cancer at his home in Leann, Missouri on January 24, 2020. He was 82 years old.

== See also ==
- Bonnie MacLean
- Psychedelic art
