= Ash Township =

Ash Township may refer to the following townships in the United States:

- Ash Township, Michigan
- Ash Township, Barry County, Missouri
