= Madry =

Madry may refer to:

- Madry, Missouri, an unincorporated community in Missouri, United States
- Mądry, a Polish surname
