= Gunter Creek =

Stream in the American state of Missouri

Gunter Creek is a stream in Barry County of southwest Missouri. The headwaters of Gunter Creek are located south of Butterfield and the stream flows northeast to its confluence with Flat Creek south of McDowell.

The stream source is located at 36°43′47″N 93°54′12″W and the confluence is at 36°48′44″N 93°47′57″W.

Gunter Creek has the name of the pioneer Gunter family.

== See also ==
- List of rivers of Missouri
