= Wheaton =

Wheaton may refer to:

== Places ==
United States

- Wheaton, Illinois, a city
  - Wheaton station (Metra), a railroad station
- Wheaton, Kansas, a city
- Wheaton, Maryland, a census-designated place
  - Wheaton station (Washington Metro), a Washington Metro rapid transit station
- Wheaton, Minnesota, a city
- Wheaton Township, Barry County, Missouri
  - Wheaton, Missouri, a city in the township
- Wheaton, Wisconsin, a town

Canada

- Wheaton Lake, British Columbia

United Kingdom

- Wheaton Aston, a village in Staffordshire

== Businesses ==
- Wheaton Industries, manufacturer of glass and ceramic products in southern New Jersey
- Wheaton Science Products, a subsidiary of Alcan based in Millville, New Jersey, related to Wheaton Industries
- Wheaton World Wide Moving, international moving and storage company in Indiana
- Wheaton Precious Metals

== Schools ==
- Wheaton Academy, West Chicago, Illinois
- Wheaton College (Illinois)
- Wheaton College (Massachusetts)
- Wheaton High School, Montgomery County, Maryland

== People ==
- Wheaton (surname)
- Wheaton Chambers (1887-1958), American film and television actor

== Other uses ==
- Wheaton v. Peters, the first United States Supreme Court case on copyright law
- Wheatons, a unit of Twitter followers

== See also ==
- Wheaton Aston, Staffordshire, England
