= Pleasant Ridge Township =

Pleasant Ridge Township may refer to:

- Pleasant Ridge Township, Fulton County, Arkansas, in Fulton County, Arkansas
- Pleasant Ridge Township, Livingston County, Illinois
- Pleasant Ridge Township, Lee County, Iowa
- Pleasant Ridge Township, Pawnee County, Kansas, in Pawnee County, Kansas
- Pleasant Ridge Township, Barry County, Missouri
- Pleasant Ridge Township, Corson County, South Dakota, in Corson County, South Dakota
