= Mineral Township =

Mineral Township may refer to the following townships in the United States:

- Mineral Township, Bureau County, Illinois
- Mineral Township, Cherokee County, Kansas
- Mineral Township, Barry County, Missouri
- Mineral Township, Venango County, Pennsylvania
