= Emerald Beach, Missouri =

- Village
- Location of Emerald Beach, Missouri
- Coordinates: 36°34′32″N 93°40′16″W
- Country: United States
- State: Missouri
- County: Barry
- Township: White River

Area
  - Total: 0.72 sq mi (1.86 km^{2})
  - Land: 0.71 sq mi (1.85 km^{2})
  - Water: 0.0039 sq mi (0.01 km^{2})
- Elevation: 961 ft (293 m)

Population (2020)
  - Total: 212
  - Density: 296.1/sq mi (114.31/km^{2})
- Time zone: UTC-6 (Central (CST))
  - Summer (DST): UTC-5 (CDT)
- FIPS code: 29-22250
- GNIS feature ID: 2398826

Emerald Beach is a village in White River Township, Barry County, Missouri, United States. The community is located on a bend in the White River now Table Rock Lake. Cassville is approximately 13 miles to the northwest and Rogers, Arkansas is 32 miles to the southwest.

It was incorporated in 1981. The village is served by the Golden Post Office and thus has a Golden address. As of the 2020 census, Emerald Beach had a population of 212.

== Geography ==
According to the United States Census Bureau, the village has a total area of 0.72 square miles (1.86 km^{2}), all land. The village is located adjacent to Table Rock Lake.

== Demographics ==
Historical population
| Census | Pop. | Note | %± |
|---|---|---|---|
| 1990 | 172 | | — |
| 2000 | 250 | | 45.3% |
| 2010 | 228 | | −8.8% |
| 2020 | 212 | | −7.0% |
U.S. Decennial Census

=== 2010 census ===
As of the census of 2010, there were 228 people, 117 households, and 76 families living in the village. The population density was 316.7 inhabitants per square mile (122.3/km^{2}). There were 245 housing units at an average density of 340.3 per square mile (131.4/km^{2}). The racial makeup of the village was 96.9% White, 1.3% Native American, 0.4% Asian, and 1.3% from two or more races. Hispanic or Latino of any race were 0.9% of the population.

There were 117 households, of which 13.7% had children under the age of 18 living with them, 54.7% were married couples living together, 7.7% had a female householder with no husband present, 2.6% had a male householder with no wife present, and 35.0% were non-families. 29.1% of all households were made up of individuals, and 8.5% had someone living alone who was 65 years of age or older. The average household size was 1.95 and the average family size was 2.37.

The median age in the village was 60.1 years. 11.8% of residents were under the age of 18; 2.7% were between the ages of 18 and 24; 7.9% were from 25 to 44; 39% were from 45 to 64; and 38.6% were 65 years of age or older. The gender makeup of the village was 53.1% male and 46.9% female.

=== 2000 census ===
As of the census of 2000, there were 250 people, 120 households, and 84 families living in the village. The population density was 349.8 inhabitants per square mile (135.1/km^{2}). There were 215 housing units at an average density of 300.8 per square mile (116.1/km^{2}). The racial makeup of the village was 98.40% White, 0.40% Native American, and 1.20% from two or more races. Hispanic or Latino of any race were 1.20% of the population.

There were 120 households, out of which 15.0% had children under the age of 18 living with them, 64.2% were married couples living together, 3.3% had a female householder with no husband present, and 29.2% were non-families. 25.8% of all households were made up of individuals, and 15.0% had someone living alone who was 65 years of age or older. The average household size was 2.08 and the average family size was 2.45.

In the village, the population was spread out, with 13.2% under the age of 18, 1.6% from 18 to 24, 16.8% from 25 to 44, 36.8% from 45 to 64, and 31.6% who were 65 years of age or older. The median age was 60.1 years according to city-data.com. For every 100 females, there were 98.4 males. For every 100 females age 18 and over, there were 93.8 males.

The median income for a household in the village was $32,813, and the median income for a family was $36,875. Males had a median income of $29,286 versus $19,063 for females. The per capita income for the village was $16,267. About 9.0% of families and 12.9% of the population were below the poverty line, including 26.7% of those under the age of eighteen and 8.3% of those 65 or over.

== Education ==
It is in the Cassville R-IV School District.
