= McDonald Township =

McDonald Township may refer to the following townships in the United States:

- McDonald Township, Barry County, Missouri
- McDonald Township, Hardin County, Ohio
