= Carney Creek =

Stream in the American state of Missouri

Carney Creek or Carneys Branch is a stream in eastern Barry County in the Ozarks of southwest Missouri.

The stream headwaters are at 36°49′42″N 93°36′52″W and its confluence with Flat Creek is at 36°45′48″N 93°36′13″W. The stream source is just southwest of Wheelerville on Missouri Route 248. It flows to the south-southeast and receives waters from Gum and Carney springs before joining Flat Creek. The stream's flow is intermittent and the confluence is about five and a half miles from its source.

Carney Creek was named after Thomas Carney, a pioneer settler.

== See also ==
- List of rivers of Missouri
