= Corsicana, Missouri =

Unincorporated community in Missouri, U.S.

Coordinates: 36°47′56″N 93°59′42″W

Corsicana is an unincorporated community in western Barry County, in the U.S. state of Missouri. The community is located along a tributary to Shoal Creek, four miles west-southwest of Purdy.

== History ==
A variant name was Gadfly. A post office called Gadfly was established in 1848, the name was changed to Corsicana in 1869, and the post office closed in 1905. The present name is a transfer from Corsicana, New York.
