= Admiral Foote =

Admiral Foote may refer to:

- Andrew Hull Foote (1806–1863), U.S. Navy rear admiral
- Edward Foote (1767–1833), British Royal Navy vice admiral
- Percy Wright Foote (1879–1961), U.S. Navy rear admiral
