= Travers, Missouri =

Unincorporated community in Missouri, U.S.

Coordinates: 36°44′37″N 93°50′12″W

Travers is an unincorporated community in Barry County, in the U.S. state of Missouri. The community is on the west side of Flat Creek just north of the Twin Springs in Corder Hollow. Butterfield is approximately 3.5 miles to the west and Cassville is about five mile upstream (southwest) along Flat Creek.

== History ==
A post office called Traverse was in operation from 1889 until 1894. The name was changed to Travers in 1898, and the post office was discontinued in 1903. The community was named after O.H. Traverse, an Illinois legislator.
