= Mountain Township, Barry County, Missouri =

Mountain Township
- Township
- Coordinates: 36°45′24″N 093°37′29″W
- Country: United States
- State: Missouri
- County: Barry

Area
  - Total: 34.90 sq mi (90.38 km^{2})
  - Land: 34.90 sq mi (90.38 km^{2})
  - Water: 0 sq mi (0 km^{2}) 0%
- Elevation: 1,020 ft (310 m)

Population (2000)
  - Total: 299
  - Density: 8.5/sq mi (3.3/km^{2})
- FIPS code: 29-50366
- GNIS feature ID: 0766263

Mountain Township is one of twenty-five townships in Barry County, Missouri, United States. As of the 2000 census, its population was 299.

Mountain Township was organized in 1846, and named for the hilly terrain within its borders.

== Geography ==
Mountain Township covers an area of 34.89 square miles (90.4 km^{2}) and contains no incorporated settlements. It contains two cemeteries: Carney and Doughty.

The stream of Carney Creek runs through this township.
