= Crane Creek Township, Barry County, Missouri =

Crane Creek Township
- Township
- Coordinates: 36°53′16″N 093°38′27″W
- Country: United States
- State: Missouri
- County: Barry

Area
  - Total: 28.19 sq mi (73.02 km^{2})
  - Land: 28.19 sq mi (73.02 km^{2})
  - Water: 0 sq mi (0 km^{2}) 0%
- Elevation: 1,355 ft (413 m)

Population (2000)
  - Total: 923
  - Density: 33/sq mi (12.6/km^{2})
- FIPS code: 29-17092
- GNIS feature ID: 0766253

Crane Creek Township is one of twenty-five townships in Barry County, Missouri, United States. As of the 2000 census, its population was 923.

Crane Creek Township was organized in 1848, and named for nearby Crane Creek.

== Geography ==
Crane Creek Township covers an area of 28.19 square miles (73.0 km^{2}) and contains no incorporated settlements. The unincorporated community of Scholten, Missouri lies within its boundaries. It contains two cemeteries: Hilton and Mars Hill.

The stream of East Fork Jenkins Creek runs through this township.
