= Tom Town Historic District =

Historic district in Missouri, United States

- U.S. National Register of Historic Places
- U.S. Historic district
- Location within Missouri Location within the United States
- Location: Off county road VV, south of Pleasant Ridge, Missouri
- Coordinates: 36°52′12″N 93°48′35″W
- Area: 2.8 acres (1.1 ha)
- Built: 1870
- NRHP reference No.: 89002126
- Added to NRHP: December 15, 1989

Tom Town Historic District, also known as Calton Mill, Carter Canning Co., and Sperandio Canning Co., is a national historic district located along Little Flat Creek approximately 4.5 miles south of Pleasant Ridge, Barry County, Missouri. The district consists of two buildings (a mill and a cannery) and a single structure (a boiler house) which are the last remnants of an historic Ozarks agricultural complex.

It was added to the National Register of Historic Places in 1989.
