= Mineral Springs =

Mineral Springs is the name of several locations in the United States:

- Mineral Springs, Arkansas
- Mineral Springs, Bartholomew County, Indiana
- Mineral Spring, Missouri
- Mineral Springs, North Carolina
- Mineral Springs Township, North Dakota
- Mineral Springs, Ohio
- Mineral Springs at Green Springs, Ohio
- Mineral Springs, Marion County, Tennessee
- Mineral Springs, Overton County, Tennessee
- Mineral Springs, Texas
- Mineral Springs, West Virginia
- Mineral Spring Turnpike
- Sycamore Mineral Springs Resort in California
- Mineral Springs Falls, in Hamilton, Ontario, Canada
- Mineral Springs Resort in Washington

== See also ==
- Mineral spring
- Mineral spa
- Mineral water
