= Roaring River (Missouri) =

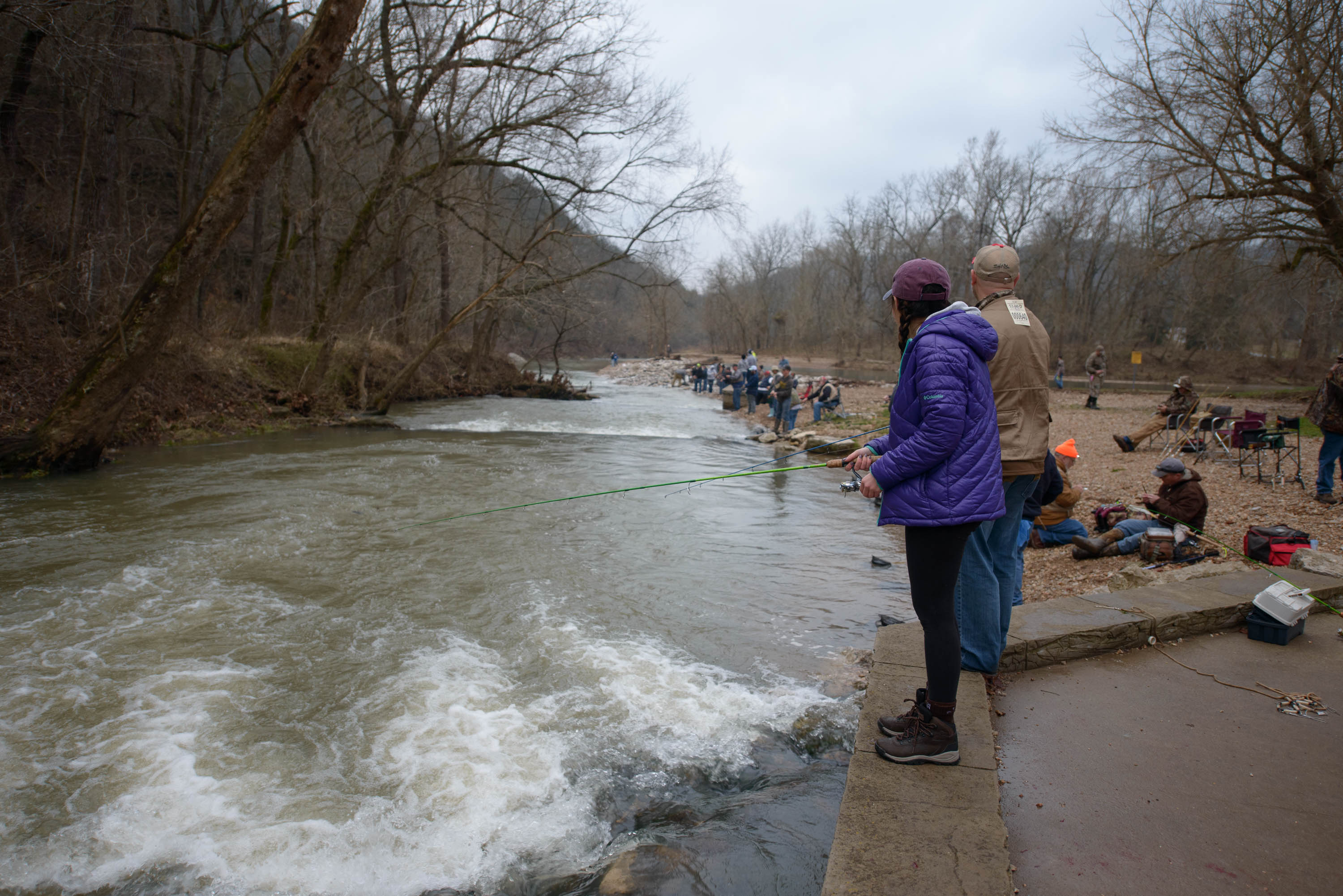

Location
- Country: United States
- State: Missouri
- Region: Ozark Plateau

Physical characteristics
- Source: Roaring River Spring
  - location: Salem Plateau, Ozark Plateau, Missouri
  - coordinates: 36°38′38″N 93°48′32″W
- Mouth: White River
  - location: Barry County, Ozark Plateau, Missouri
  - coordinates: 36°32′16″N 93°42′59″W
- Length: 14.9 mi (24.0 km)
- Discharge
  - location: Roaring River State Park
  - average: 71 cu/ft. per sec.

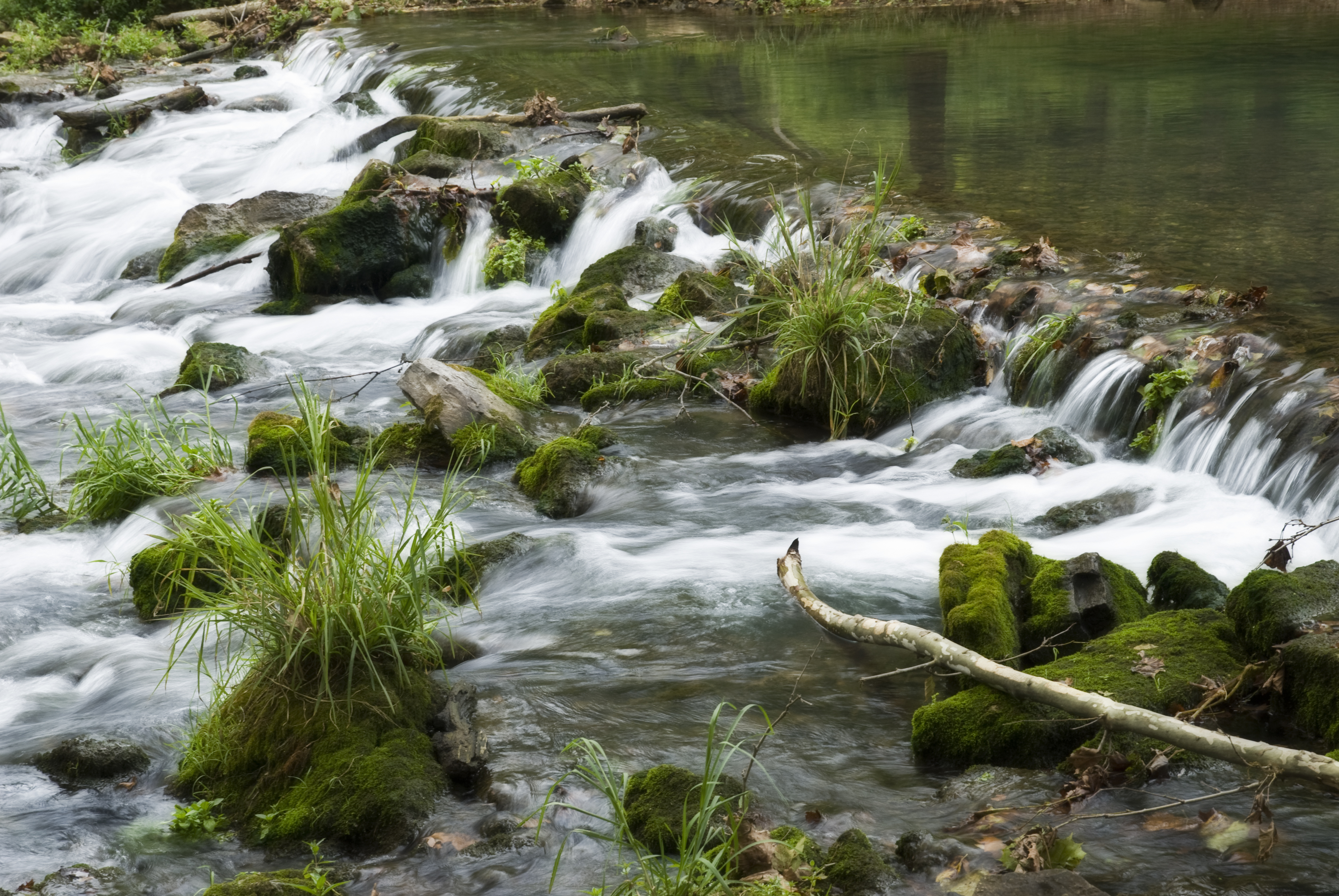
The water rippling over the rocks at Roaring River State Park.

The Roaring River is a 14.9-mile-long (24.0 km) river in Barry County, Missouri, in the Ozarks. It is a tributary of the White River, into which it flows in Eagle Rock, Missouri. This section of the White River is a reservoir called Table Rock Lake.

The stream was named on account of roaring waters from a cave along its course.

== See also ==
- List of rivers of Missouri
- List of rivers of Arkansas
- List of Ozark springs
