= Wheaton station (Missouri) =

- Wheaton Missouri and North Arkansas Railroad Depot
- U.S. National Register of Historic Places
- Location within Missouri Location within the United States
- Location: Jct. of Main and Barnett Sts., Wheaton, Missouri
- Coordinates: 36°45′48″N 94°3′15″W
- Area: less than one acre
- Built: 1908
- Architectural style: Standardized depot
- NRHP reference No.: 00000085
- Added to NRHP: February 10, 2000

Wheaton Missouri and North Arkansas Railroad Depot is a historic train station located at Wheaton, Barry County, Missouri. It was built in 1908 by the Missouri and Northern Arkansas Railroad. It is a one-story rectangular frame building with a hipped roof. It measures 18 feet by 58 feet and features a three-sided bay window. It remained in use until 1947.

It was added to the National Register of Historic Places in 2000.
