= McDowell, Missouri =

Unincorporated community in Missouri, U.S.

Coordinates: 36°49′27″N 93°47′36″W

McDowell is an unincorporated community in Barry County, in the U.S. state of Missouri.

The community is on Missouri Route VV 5 miles south of Pleasant Ridge. Missouri Route C passes the south side of the community along Little Flat Creek. Purdy is seven miles to the west along Route C.

== History ==
A post office called McDowell was established in 1858, and remained in operation until 1925. The community's name honors the local McDowell family.
