= Roaring River Township, Barry County, Missouri =

Roaring River Township
- Township
- Coordinates: 36°32′45″N 093°43′49″W
- Country: United States
- State: Missouri
- County: Barry

Area
  - Total: 72.06 sq mi (186.63 km^{2})
  - Land: 68.68 sq mi (177.87 km^{2})
  - Water: 3.38 sq mi (8.76 km^{2}) 4.69%
- Elevation: 968 ft (295 m)

Population (2000)
  - Total: 1,396
  - Density: 20/sq mi (7.8/km^{2})
- FIPS code: 29-62318
- GNIS feature ID: 0766268

Roaring River Township is one of twenty-five townships in Barry County, Missouri, United States. As of the 2000 census, its population was 1,396.

The township takes its name from Roaring River.

== Geography ==
Roaring River Township covers an area of 72.06 square miles (186.6 km^{2}) and contains one incorporated settlement, Chain-O-Lakes. It contains three cemeteries: Easley, Munsey and Roach.

The streams of Butler Creek, Cedar Creek, Darity Branch, East Fork Rock Creek, Haddock Creek, Hottle Branch, Johns Branch, Panther Creek, Raridan Branch, Roaring River and Stubblefield Branch run through this township.
