= Chain-O-Lakes, Missouri =

- Village
- Location of Chain-O-Lakes, Missouri
- Coordinates: 36°32′3″N 93°43′27″W
- Country: United States
- State: Missouri
- County: Barry
- Township: Roaring River

Area
  - Total: 0.085 sq mi (0.22 km^{2})
  - Land: 0.085 sq mi (0.22 km^{2})
  - Water: 0 sq mi (0.00 km^{2})
- Elevation: 1,024 ft (312 m)

Population (2020)
  - Total: 106
  - Density: 1,266.9/sq mi (489.17/km^{2})
- Time zone: UTC-6 (Central (CST))
  - Summer (DST): UTC-5 (CDT)
- ZIP code: 65641
- Area code: 417
- FIPS code: 29-13015
- GNIS feature ID: 2397597

Chain-O-Lakes is a village in Roaring River Township of southeast Barry County, Missouri, United States. As of the 2020 census, Chain-O-Lakes had a population of 106.

== Geography ==
According to the United States Census Bureau, the village has a total area of 0.08 square miles (0.21 km^{2}), all land.

== Demographics ==
Historical population
Census	Pop.	Note	%±
1980	76		—
1990	111		46.1%
2000	127		14.4%
2010	126		−0.8%
2020	106		−15.9%
U.S. Decennial Census

=== 2010 census ===
As of the census of 2010, there were 126 people, 57 households, and 37 families living in the village. The population density was 1,575.0 inhabitants per square mile (608.1/km^{2}). There were 84 housing units at an average density of 1,050.0 per square mile (405.4/km^{2}). The racial makeup of the village was 99.2% White and 0.8% Asian.

There were 57 households, of which 19.3% had children under the age of 18 living with them, 52.6% were married couples living together, 8.8% had a female householder with no husband present, 3.5% had a male householder with no wife present, and 35.1% were non-families. 29.8% of all households were made up of individuals, and 17.6% had someone living alone who was 65 years of age or older. The average household size was 2.21 and the average family size was 2.76.

The median age in the village was 59.3 years. 15.1% of residents were under the age of 18; 2.5% were between the ages of 18 and 24; 14.4% were from 25 to 44; 30.1% were from 45 to 64; and 38.1% were 65 years of age or older. The gender makeup of the village was 50.0% male and 50.0% female.

=== 2000 census ===
As of the census of 2000, there were 127 people, 64 households, and 40 families living in the village. The population density was 1,505.9 inhabitants per square mile (581.4/km^{2}). There were 81 housing units at an average density of 960.4 per square mile (370.8/km^{2}). The racial makeup of the village was 96.06% White, 0.79% Native American, and 3.15% from two or more races.

There were 64 households, out of which 9.4% had children under the age of 18 living with them, 57.8% were married couples living together, 3.1% had a female householder with no husband present, and 37.5% were non-families. 32.8% of all households were made up of individuals, and 23.4% had someone living alone who was 65 years of age or older. The average household size was 1.98 and the average family size was 2.48.

In the village, the population was spread out, with 13.4% under the age of 18, 0.8% from 18 to 24, 15.7% from 25 to 44, 30.7% from 45 to 64, and 39.4% who were 65 years of age or older. The median age was 59 years. For every 100 females, there were 86.8 males. For every 100 females age 18 and over, there were 96.4 males.

The median income for a household in the village was $25,714, and the median income for a family was $29,375. Males had a median income of $14,583 versus $14,545 for females. The per capita income for the village was $14,944. There were 3.2% of families and 7.8% of the population living below the poverty line, including 21.4% of under eighteens and none of those over 64.
