= Exeter, Missouri =

- City
- Location of Exeter, Missouri
- Coordinates: 36°40′14″N 93°56′24″W
- Country: United States
- State: Missouri
- County: Barry
- Township: Exeter

Area
  - Total: 0.79 sq mi (2.05 km^{2})
  - Land: 0.79 sq mi (2.05 km^{2})
  - Water: 0 sq mi (0.00 km^{2})
- Elevation: 1,549 ft (472 m)

Population (2020)
  - Total: 733
  - Density: 927.6/sq mi (358.16/km^{2})
- Time zone: UTC-6 (Central (CST))
  - Summer (DST): UTC-5 (CDT)
- ZIP code: 65647
- Area code: 417
- FIPS code: 29-23122
- GNIS feature ID: 2394719

Exeter is a city in Exeter Township, Barry County, Missouri, United States. As of the 2020 census, Exeter had a population of 733.

== Geography ==
According to the United States Census Bureau, the city has a total area of 0.79 square miles (2.05 km^{2}), all land.

== History ==
Exeter was platted in 1880. The city was named after Exeter in Devon, England.

The Frisco rail line ran through much of the Ozarks, including Exeter, bringing in tourists on their way to resorts, such as Mineral Springs. In 1896, the shortest railway in the country was built to connect Exeter and Cassville. It served as the main way into Cassville during the harsh winters that made many roads impassable. The rail-line was named "The Cassville and Western Railroad." Because the railway ran only 4.8 miles one-way, the railway had to rely on steam power to travel uphill back to Exeter. Since Exeter is the highest point in the county, it was able to use gravity to coast back downhill to Cassville During its economic height, a hotel called The Palace was also built in Exeter as well as a flour mill. A massive fire broke out and burned the downtown on Oct. 21st, 1927. The railroad went bankrupt in 1956. In the 1950s, there was an Exeter's Farmer Exchange, a market, and a post office. The post office has been in operation at Exeter since 1880.

Notable people born in Exeter include Major League baseball player Ed Hawk and professional bull rider Mason Lowe. The Exeter High School Boys Basketball team won the state championship in 1963. The Exeter High School Girls Basketball team won the state championship in 2009 and finished second in 2011. The Exeter High school won District first time in program in 23-24 spring season for Baseball

== Demographics ==
Historical population
Census	Pop.	Note	%±
1890	244		—
1900	438		79.5%
1910	375		−14.4%
1920	399		6.4%
1930	323		−19.0%
1940	249		−22.9%
1950	355		42.6%
1960	294		−17.2%
1970	434		47.6%
1980	588		35.5%
1990	597		1.5%
2000	707		18.4%
2010	772		9.2%
2020	733		−5.1%
U.S. Decennial Census

=== 2010 census ===
As of the census of 2010, there were 772 people, 293 households, and 213 families living in the city. The population density was 977.2 inhabitants per square mile (377.3/km^{2}). There were 344 housing units at an average density of 435.4 per square mile (168.1/km^{2}). The racial makeup of the city was 94.7% White, 0.4% African American, 0.4% Native American, 0.5% Asian, 1.7% from other races, and 2.3% from two or more races. Hispanic or Latino of any race were 5.1% of the population.

There were 293 households, of which 41.0% had children under the age of 18 living with them, 49.1% were married couples living together, 17.7% had a female householder with no husband present, 5.8% had a male householder with no wife present, and 27.3% were non-families. 22.9% of all households were made up of individuals, and 9.2% had someone living alone who was 65 years of age or older. The average household size was 2.63 and the average family size was 3.05.

The median age in the city was 33.6 years. 30.2% of residents were under the age of 18; 8.8% were between the ages of 18 and 24; 25.7% were from 25 to 44; 22.4% were from 45 to 64; and 12.8% were 65 years of age or older. The gender makeup of the city was 48.3% male and 51.7% female.

=== 2000 census ===
As of the census of 2000, there were 707 people, 303 households, and 196 families living in the city. The population density was 889.0 inhabitants per square mile (343.2/km^{2}). There were 324 housing units at an average density of 407.4 per square mile (157.3/km^{2}). The racial makeup of the city was 95.05% White, 0.57% Native American, 1.70% from other races, and 2.69% from two or more races. Hispanic or Latino of any race were 4.53% of the population.

There were 303 households, out of which 33.7% had children under the age of 18 living with them, 46.5% were married couples living together, 13.9% had a female householder with no husband present, and 35.0% were non-families. 32.3% of all households were made up of individuals, and 15.2% had someone living alone who was 65 years of age or older. The average household size was 2.33 and the average family size was 2.89.

In the city the population was spread out, with 28.3% under the age of 18, 8.5% from 18 to 24, 27.9% from 25 to 44, 21.8% from 45 to 64, and 13.6% who were 65 years of age or older. The median age was 35 years. For every 100 females, there were 84.1 males. For every 100 females age 18 and over, there were 81.7 males.

The median income for a household in the city was $25,438, and the median income for a family was $28,906. Males had a median income of $24,643 versus $17,981 for females. The per capita income for the city was $11,600. About 11.8% of families and 18.6% of the population were below the poverty line, including 18.1% of those under age 18 and 26.1% of those age 65 or over.
