= Osa, Missouri =

Unincorporated community in Missouri, U.S.

Coordinates: 36°54′16″N 93°38′04″W

Osa is an unincorporated community in the northeast corner of Barry County, in the U.S. state of Missouri. The community is on Missouri Route JJ 1.5 miles north of Reavisville. Crane in adjacent Stone County is three miles to the east.

== History ==
A post office called Osa was established in 1895, and remained in operation until 1908. The origin of the name Osa is obscure.
