= Percy Wright Foote =

United States Navy admiral (1879–1961)

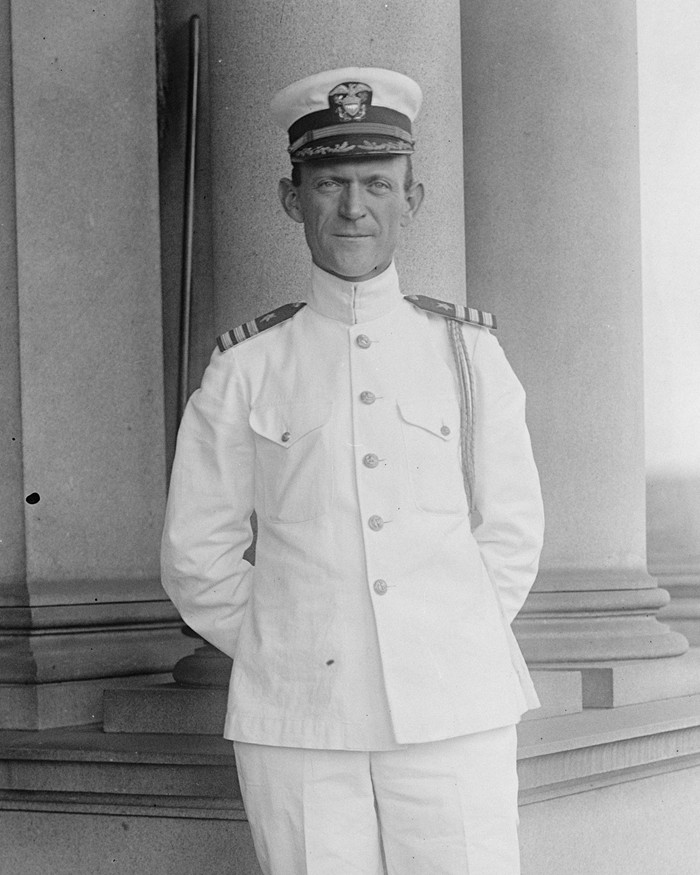
- Percy Wright Foote as US navy commander
- Born: August 13, 1879; Roaring River, Wilkes County, North Carolina
- Died: June 23, 1961 (aged 81); Charlotte, Mecklenburg, United States
- Military career
- Allegiance: United States
- Branch: U.S. Navy (USS President Lincoln)
- Rank: Rear Admiral
- Conflicts: World War I
- Awards: Distinguished Service Medal

Percy Wright Foote (August 13, 1879 – June 23, 1961) was an American naval officer, and rear admiral of the United States Navy who served as the commanding officer of a US ship during World War I. The President of the United States of that time conferred Distinguished Service Medal upon Foote for representing his responsibilities as commanding officer of the USS President Lincoln. Foote was praised by the Government of United States and the navy officials for combating a disaster when torpedoes from the German submarine U-90 struck his ship on 31 May 1918.

== Biography ==
Foote was born to James Henry Foote and Susanna Clemene Hunt on August 13, 1879 in Roaring River Township, North Carolina. He was married to Grace Genevieve Clary and had two children Capt Thomas Clary Foote and Diana Harrison Foote. Foote graduated from the United States Naval Academy at Annapolis in 1901. He served as a commanding officer and later, rear admiral of the United States Navy.

== Career ==
On May 20, 1887, he was appointed as naval cadet and was commissioned ensign on June 6, 1903.

In 1906, he strengthened the Navy by introducing a specific fire control method.

Foote was promoted to the junior grade of lieutenant and lieutenant on June 7, 1907. Percy also served lieutenant commander on March 10, 1914, and later, he took several positions, including commanding officer.

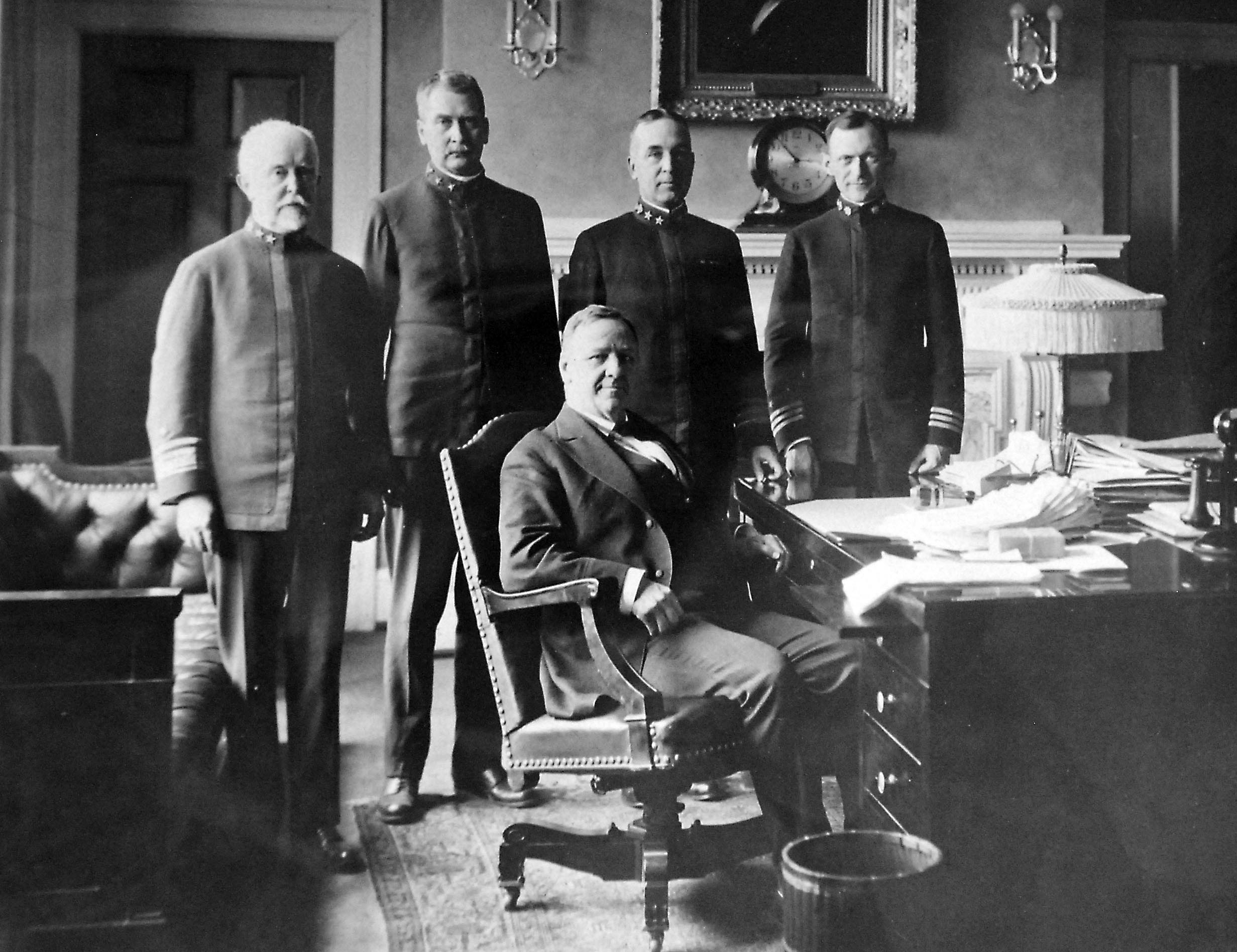
In 1920 Foote (far right) was aide to Secretary of the Navy Josephus Daniels’ Office at the State, War and Navy Building (now Eisenhower Executive Building), Washington, D.C.

The US navy commander Percy was described in heroic terms for saving his ship, the USS President Lincoln when it was struck by a German submarine that was carrying US military personnel during the war. On May 31, 1918, the ship was torpedoed by the U-90 submarine that killed seven military personnel, and rest men were rescued by him and prevented the ship from sinking. He was consequently commended by the Navy Secretary Josephus Daniels, and awarded the Silver Star for gallantry in action, and the Distinguished Service Medal.

He was the aide to Josephus Daniels, Secretary of the Navy, during 1918-1921. Later appointed commander of the USS Arkansas, 1931-1933, before his retirement.

He was recalled during World War II as senior inspector of shipyards in Arkansas, Oklahoma, Louisiana, and Texas during World War II.

He retired as rear admiral. He is buried in Arlington National Cemetery.
