= Brights Spring =

Spring in Missouri, U.S.

Coordinates: 36.8050626°N 93.8004773°W

Brights Spring is a stream in Barry County in the U.S. state of Missouri.

Brights Spring has the name of O. P. Bright, the original owner of the site.

== See also ==
- List of rivers of Missouri
