= Corsicana Township, Barry County, Missouri =

Corsicana Township
- Township
- Coordinates: 36°48′00″N 093°59′17″W
- Country: United States
- State: Missouri
- County: Barry

Area
  - Total: 17.06 sq mi (44.19 km^{2})
  - Land: 17.06 sq mi (44.19 km^{2})
  - Water: 0 sq mi (0 km^{2}) 0%
- Elevation: 1,325 ft (404 m)

Population (2000)
  - Total: 326
  - Density: 19/sq mi (7.4/km^{2})
- FIPS code: 29-16534
- GNIS feature ID: 0766252

Corsicana Township is one of twenty-five townships in Barry County, Missouri, United States. As of the 2000 census, its population was 326.

== Geography ==
Corsicana Township covers an area of 17.06 square miles (44.2 km^{2}) and contains no incorporated settlements. It contains two cemeteries: Burton and Clark.
