= Monett Township, Barry County, Missouri =

Monett Township
- Township
- Coordinates: 36°54′49″N 093°55′48″W
- Country: United States
- State: Missouri
- County: Barry

Area
  - Total: 16.17 sq mi (41.87 km^{2})
  - Land: 16.17 sq mi (41.87 km^{2})
  - Water: 0 sq mi (0 km^{2}) 0%
- Elevation: 1,289 ft (393 m)

Population (2000)
  - Total: 5,906
  - Density: 365/sq mi (141.1/km^{2})
- FIPS code: 29-49214
- GNIS feature ID: 0766262

Monett Township is one of twenty-five townships in Barry County, Missouri, United States. As of the 2000 census, its population was 5,906.

Monett Township was named for a railroad official.

== Geography ==
Monett Township covers an area of 16.17 square miles (41.9 km^{2}) and contains one incorporated settlement, Monett. It contains two cemeteries: Carlin and New Site.

The stream of Kelly Creek runs through this township.
