= Arrow Point, Missouri =

- Village
- Location of Arrow Point, Missouri
- Coordinates: 36°32′38″N 93°37′37″W
- Country: United States
- State: Missouri
- County: Barry
- Township: White River

Area
  - Total: 0.19 sq mi (0.50 km^{2})
  - Land: 0.19 sq mi (0.50 km^{2})
  - Water: 0 sq mi (0.00 km^{2})
- Elevation: 1,086 ft (331 m)

Population (2020)
  - Total: 75
  - Density: 391.7/sq mi (151.24/km^{2})
- Time zone: UTC-6 (Central (CST))
  - Summer (DST): UTC-5 (CDT)
- Zip Code: 65658
- FIPS code: 29-02034
- GNIS feature ID: 2397991

Arrow Point is a village in White River Township of southeast Barry County, Missouri, United States. The population was 75 at the 2020 census.

== Geography ==
According to the United States Census Bureau, the village has a total area of 0.19 square miles (0.49 km^{2}), all land.

== Demographics ==
Historical population
Census	Pop.	Note	%±
2000	133		—
2010	86		−35.3%
2020	75		−12.8%
U.S. Decennial Census

=== 2010 census ===
As of the census of 2010, there were 86 people, 43 households, and 26 families living in the village. The population density was 452.6 inhabitants per square mile (174.7/km^{2}). There were 79 housing units at an average density of 415.8 per square mile (160.5/km^{2}). The racial makeup of the village was 98.8% White and 1.2% from two or more races.

There were 43 households, of which 18.6% had children under the age of 18 living with them, 51.2% were married couples living together, 7.0% had a female householder with no husband present, 2.3% had a male householder with no wife present, and 39.5% were non-families. 34.9% of all households were made up of individuals, and 16.3% had someone living alone who was 65 years of age or older. The average household size was 2.00 and the average family size was 2.54.

The median age in the village was 56 years. 15.1% of residents were under the age of 18; 4.6% were between the ages of 18 and 24; 14.1% were from 25 to 44; 31.3% were from 45 to 64; and 34.9% were 65 years of age or older. The gender makeup of the village was 53.5% male and 46.5% female.

=== 2000 census ===
As of the census of 2000, there were 133 people, 62 households, and 43 families living in the village. The population density was 256.6 inhabitants per square mile (99.1/km^{2}). There were 113 housing units at an average density of 218.0 per square mile (84.2/km^{2}). The racial makeup of the village was 98.50% White, and 1.50% from two or more races. Hispanic or Latino of any race were 0.75% of the population.

There were 62 households, out of which 16.1% had children under the age of 18 living with them, 62.9% were married couples living together, 4.8% had a female householder with no husband present, and 30.6% were non-families. 25.8% of all households were made up of individuals, and 11.3% had someone living alone who was 65 years of age or older. The average household size was 2.15 and the average family size was 2.51.

In the village, the population was spread out, with 18.0% under the age of 18, 3.0% from 18 to 24, 21.1% from 25 to 44, 36.8% from 45 to 64, and 21.1% who were 65 years of age or older. The median age was 49 years. For every 100 females, there were 107.8 males. For every 100 females age 18 and over, there were 87.9 males.

The median income for a household in the village was $21,429, and the median income for a family was $22,143. Males had a median income of $23,750 versus $15,625 for females. The per capita income for the village was $11,014. There were 25.0% of families and 34.1% of the population living below the poverty line, including 51.7% of under eighteens and 5.0% of those over 64.

== Education ==
It is in the Cassville R-IV School District.
