= Leann, Missouri =

Unincorporated community in Missouri, U.S.

Coordinates: 36°48′46″N 93°41′25″W

Leann is an unincorporated community in northeast Barry County, in the U.S. state of Missouri. The community is on Missouri Route 39 approximately two miles north of Jenkins. Jenkins Creek flow past the east side of the site. Cassville is twelve miles to the southwest.

== History ==
A variant name was Marmaduke. A post office called Marmaduke was established in 1886, the name was changed to Leann in 1890, and the post office closed in 1935. The present name is after Leann Thomas, the wife of an early postmaster.
