= Roaring River State Park =

State park in Missouri, United States

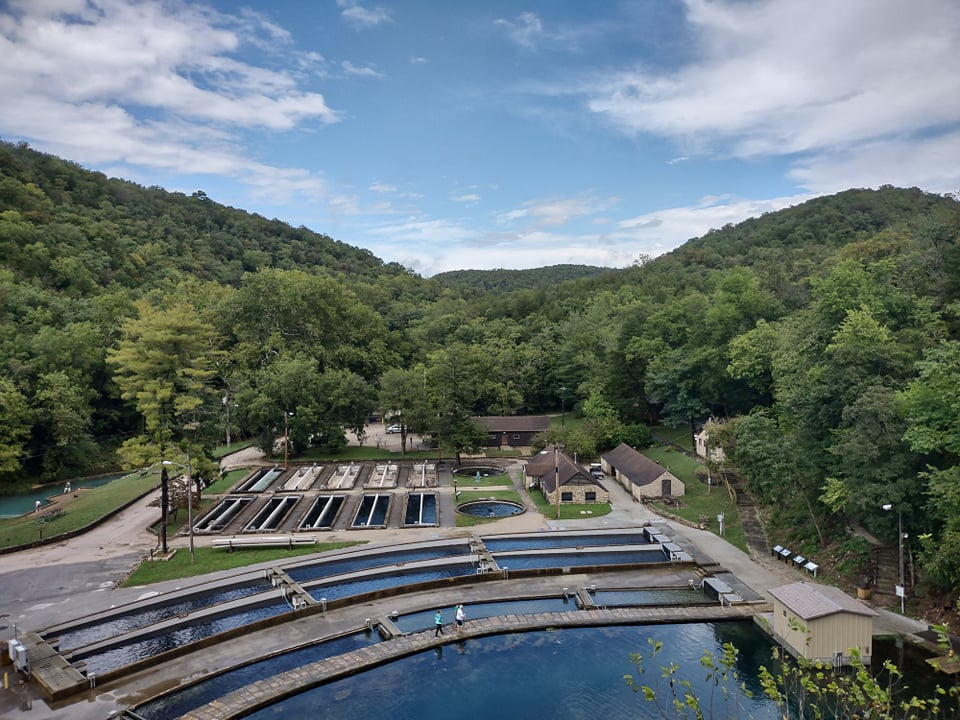
- Fish hatchery at Roaring River State Park

- Location within Missouri Location within the United States
- Location: Barry County, Missouri, United States
- Coordinates: 36°35′29″N 93°49′54″W
- Area: 4,820.68 acres (1,950.86 ha)
- Elevation: 1,188 ft (362 m)
- Established: 1928
- Administrator: Missouri Department of Natural Resources
- Visitors: 1,130,496 (in 2023)
- Website: Official website

Roaring River State Park is a public recreation area covering of 4,294 acres (1,738 ha) eight miles (13 km) south of Cassville in Barry County, Missouri. The state park offers trout fishing on the Roaring River, hiking on seven different trails, and the seasonally open Ozark Chinquapin Nature Center.

== History ==
Land for the park was originally donated by Thomas Mark “Doc” Sayman, a medicine-show man who made millions peddling patent medicines and soaps during his traveling tent shows in the early 20th century. When Sayman failed to get the game and fish commission to buy property at Roaring River Spring, he purchased 2,400 acres which he then turned over to the state. The original park was acquired in 1923, and developed between 1933 and 1939 by the Civilian Conservation Corps and Works Progress Administration.

== Historic sites ==
The park includes several resources dating from the 1930s that were listed on the National Register of Historic Places in 1985 and that are also included in the Emergency Conservation Work (E.C.W.) Architecture in Missouri State Parks, 1933-1942, Thematic Resources.

- Bath House (NRIS 85000500): The clubhouse (or bath house) was built between 1936 and 1938, and is a rambling one-story, rustic stone building. It has a curvilinear section and a gable roof. It is the last surviving structure in a lake and beach development project initiated, but never completed, by the Civilian Conservation Corps (CCC).
- Camp Smokey/Company 1713 Historic District (NRIS 85000513): This historic district encompasses three buildings and one structure that were part of the central compound of the CCC installation. They were erected in 1933 and are the Outdoor Fireplace/Chimney, Barracks No. 2 (Foreman's Quarters), Barracks #3 (Hospital), and Barracks #4 (Education and Supply Building).
- Dam/Spillway (NRIS 85000518): The original stone and earthen dam was built in 1865 by William McClure to power McClure's Mill (destroyed c. 1920). The dam was reconstructed by the CCC in 1933 for an important fish hatchery complex.
- Deer Leap Trail (NRIS 85000519): It was built between 1933 and 1939 by the CCC, and is a man-made trail, approximately 3/10 of a mile in length. It has rough stone steps and stone retaining walls and features the Deer Leap Overlook.
- Honeymoon Cabin (NRIS 85000520): Also known as Cabin #26, it is a small (15 feet by 23 feet) rectangular rustic cottage with an enclosed front porch in a secluded location. It was built between 1933 and 1939 by the CCC, and has a cross-gable roof, board-and-batten siding, and a stone foundation.
- Hotel (NRIS 85000501): Also known as the Lodge, it is a three-story, native stone and wood rectangular building with a full-length second-story porch. It was built in 1938 by CCC and Works Progress Administration relief workers.
- Shelter Kitchen No. 2 and Rest Room (NRIS 85000521): The Shelter Kitchen No. 2, or Shelter House, was built by the CCC in 1934, and is a rustic log structure with a flagstone floor and side-gable roof. The stone rest room is a small rectangular building with a front gable roof.

In April, 2002, the restored Russell family gravesite and monument was dedicated. In the 1830s, Milo B. Russell and his wife, Unice Mariah Haddock Russell, homesteaded land on the eastern end of what is now Roaring River State Park. The monument includes an exhibit of historical photographs of the old homestead.

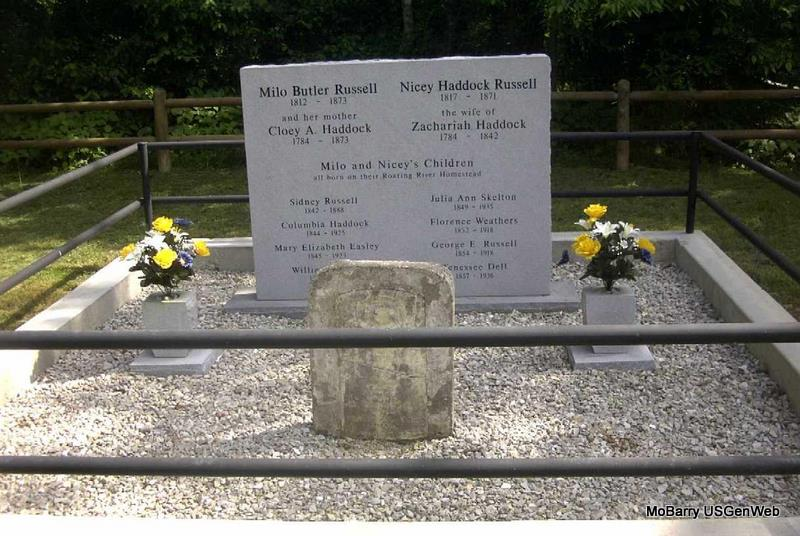
Monument to Milo & Unice Haddock Russell at Roaring River State Park
