= Pulaskifield, Missouri =

Pulaskifield
- Unincorporated community
- Location within Missouri Location within the United States
- Coordinates: 36°52′21″N 94°00′39″W
- Country: United States
- State: Missouri
- County: Barry
- Settled: 1893
- unincorporated community: 1835
- Elevation: 1,270 ft (390 m)
- Time zone: UTC-6 (CST)
  - Summer (DST): UTC-5 (CDT)
- ZIP codes: 65708, 65723
- Area code: 417
- FIPS code: 29/60104
- GNIS feature ID: 735810

Pulaskifield is an unincorporated community located in Capps Creek Township, Barry County, Missouri, United States.

The area was originally known as Bricefield (named for J. Brice Hudson whose father owned the land on which the general store of August Dombroski (first postmaster) was located and in which the post office was established in 1893); archaically misspelled Brassfield or Brycefield.

The area was locally known under the community name of Pulaskifield, but officially changed to that name in 1930 by request of the large group of Polish immigrants who bought land and began farming, beginning in the late 1870s, in an approximate two-mile radius of the crossing point of Missouri Route 97 and Barry County Farm Road 2040. The community was renamed to honor Casimir Pulaski, a Polish nobleman and Revolutionary Continental Army Brigadier General remembered as a hero who fought for independence and freedom both in Poland and in the United States.
