= Capps Creek Township, Barry County, Missouri =

Capps Creek Township
- Township
- Coordinates: 36°54′00″N 094°02′44″W
- Country: United States
- State: Missouri
- County: Barry

Area
  - Total: 29.22 sq mi (75.67 km^{2})
  - Land: 29.22 sq mi (75.67 km^{2})
  - Water: 0 sq mi (0 km^{2}) 0%
- Elevation: 1,207 ft (368 m)

Population (2000)
  - Total: 570
  - Density: 19/sq mi (7.5/km^{2})
- FIPS code: 29-11332
- GNIS feature ID: 0766251

Capps Creek Township is one of twenty-five townships in Barry County, Missouri, United States. As of the 2000 census, its population was 570.

Capps Creek Township was established in 1845, taking its name from Capps Creek.

== Geography ==
Capps Creek Township covers an area of 29.22 square miles (75.7 km^{2}) and contains no incorporated settlements.

The streams of Hudson Creek, South Fork Capps Creek and Zerbert Branch run through this township.

Jolly Bethel Church and Cemetery and Sts. Peter and Paul Catholic Church and Cemitery are located in the township.

== Transportation ==
Capps Creek Township contains one airport or landing strip, Monett Municipal Airport.
