= Shell Knob Township, Barry County, Missouri =

Shell Knob Township
- Township
- Coordinates: 36°37′19″N 093°37′42″W
- Country: United States
- State: Missouri
- County: Barry

Area
  - Total: 39.00 sq mi (101.01 km^{2})
  - Land: 36.92 sq mi (95.63 km^{2})
  - Water: 2.08 sq mi (5.38 km^{2}) 5.33%
- Elevation: 1,152 ft (351 m)

Population (2000)
  - Total: 1,181
  - Density: 32/sq mi (12.3/km^{2})
- FIPS code: 29-67250
- GNIS feature ID: 0766269

Shell Knob Township is one of twenty-five townships in Barry County, Missouri, United States. As of the 2000 census, its population was 1,181.

Some say the namesake Shell Knob has the name of one Mr. Shell, an early settler, while others believe deposits of shell fossils caused the name to be selected.

== Geography ==
Shell Knob Township covers an area of 39 square miles (100 km^{2}) and contains no incorporated settlements. It contains one cemetery, Epperly Memorial.

The streams of Big Creek, Carter Branch, Cedar Branch, Kings River and Mill Creek run through this township.

== Transportation ==
Shell Knob Township contains one airport or landing strip, Turkey Mountain Estates Airport.

== Notes ==
- USGS Geographic Names Information System (GNIS)
