= Jenkins Creek (Flat Creek tributary) =

Stream in Barry County, Missouri, U.S.

Jenkins Creek is a stream in Barry County, Missouri. The stream source at the junction of the East and West forks is at coordinates: 36°49′24″N 93°41′17″W just north of Leann and the confluence with Flat Creek is at: 36°46′30″N 93°41′06″W just south of Jenkins.

Jenkins Creek bears the name of a pioneer settler.

== See also ==
- List of rivers of Missouri
