= Purdy Township, Barry County, Missouri =

Township in the U.S. state of Missouri

Purdy Township
- Township
- Coordinates: 36°49′15″N 093°55′12″W
- Country: United States
- State: Missouri
- County: Barry

Area
  - Total: 23.56 sq mi (61.02 km^{2})
  - Land: 24 sq mi (61 km^{2})
  - Water: 0.0077 sq mi (0.02 km^{2}) 0.03%
- Elevation: 1,480 ft (451 m)

Population (2000)
  - Total: 2,031
  - Density: 86/sq mi (33.3/km^{2})
- FIPS code: 29-60194
- GNIS feature ID: 0766267

Purdy Township is one of twenty-five townships in Barry County, Missouri, United States. As of the 2000 census, its population was 2,031.

== Geography ==
Purdy Township covers an area of 23.56 square miles (61.0 km^{2}) and contains one incorporated settlement, Purdy. It contains two cemeteries: Matty and Stinett.

== Transportation ==
Purdy Township contains two airports or landing strips: Gibbons Air Park and Ingram Private Airport.
