= Cato, Missouri =

Unincorporated community in Missouri, U.S.

Coordinates: 36°43′15″N 93°40′49″W

Cato is an unincorporated community in Barry County, in the U.S. state of Missouri. The community is located on Missouri Route 39 in the Mark Twain National Forest, approximately ten miles east-northeast of Cassville.

== History ==
A post office called Cato was established in 1895, and remained in operation until 1958. The community was named after Cato, a local Native American.

Cato is mentioned in the 1960 film "Elmer Gantry."
