= Cassville R-IV School District =

School district in Missouri, U.S.

Cassville R-IV School District is a school district headquartered in Cassville, Missouri.

It includes the communities of Cassville, Arrow Point, Butterfield, Eagle Rock, Emerald Beach, and Golden. An island in the Shell Knob census-designated place also falls in the district boundaries.

== History ==
In 2001 the district stopped allowing the use of corporal punishment.

Merlyn Johnson became superintendent in 2021. In 2022 the district had 1,900 students. That year the district began using corporal punishment again in cases where parents approve of the option. The district did this because several area parents wanted that option.

== Schools ==
- Cassville High School
- Cassville Middle School
- Cassville Intermediate School
- Eunice Thomas Elementary School
