= Butterfield Township, Barry County, Missouri =

Township in the US state of Missouri

Butterfield Township
- Township
- Coordinates: 36°44′51″N 093°54′43″W
- Country: United States
- State: Missouri
- County: Barry

Area
  - Total: 14.48 sq mi (37.51 km^{2})
  - Land: 14.48 sq mi (37.51 km^{2})
  - Water: 0 sq mi (0 km^{2}) 0%
- Elevation: 1,510 ft (460 m)

Population (2000)
  - Total: 916
  - Density: 63/sq mi (24.4/km^{2})
- FIPS code: 29-10162
- GNIS feature ID: 0766250

Butterfield Township is one of twenty-five townships in Barry County, Missouri, United States. As of the 2000 census, its population was 916.

The township has the name of Fredrick Butterfield, a railroad official.

== Geography ==
Butterfield Township covers an area of 14.48 square miles (37.5 km^{2}) and contains one incorporated settlement, Butterfield.
