= Little Flat Creek =

Stream in south-central Missouri, U.S.

Little Flat Creek is a stream in Barry County in the Ozarks of south-central Missouri. It is a tributary of Flat Creek.

The stream headwaters arise at 36°47′45″N 93°55′15″W just east of Missouri Route 37 about 1.5 miles south of Purdy. The stream flows north-northeast about three miles past the east side of Purdy to the Macedonia Church. There it turns east and flows east to southeast for approximately five miles. It passes under Missouri Route C south of McDowell to enter Flat Creek at 36°49′06″N 93°47′16″W.

The Tom Town Historic District is located along Little Flat Creek.
