= Scholten, Missouri =

Unincorporated community in Missouri, U.S.

Coordinates: 36°30′21″N 93°22′30″W

Scholten is an unincorporated community in northeast Barry County, Missouri, United States, located approximately 16 miles (26 km) northeast of Cassville. Scholten is located on Missouri Route D one mile north of Wheelerville and Missouri Route 248. Its elevation is 1,378 feet (420 m).

A post office called Scholten was established in 1886, and remained in operation until 1919. The community has the name of the local Scholten family.
