= Pasley, Missouri =

- Unincorporated community
- Location within Missouri
- Coordinates: 36°37′41″N 93°53′19″W
- Country: United States
- State: Missouri
- County: Barry
- Elevation: 1,476 ft (450 m)
- Time zone: UTC-6 (Central (CST))
  - Summer (DST): UTC-5 (CDT)
- Area code: 417
- GNIS feature ID: 724066

Pasley (formerly known as Milwaukee or Millowakee) is an unincorporated community in Barry County, Missouri, United States. Pasley was originally known as Milwaukee after a store in the community; after a fire destroyed the store in the 1930s, the name was changed to Pasley for a local school.
