= Yonkerville, Missouri =

Unincorporated area in Missouri, U.S.

Coordinates: 36°54′58″N 94°00′34″W

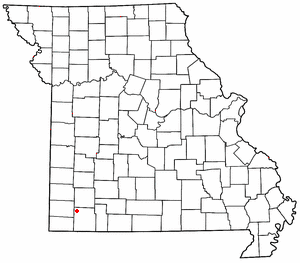

Yonkerville refers generally to the intersection of U.S. Route 60 and Route 97 in an unincorporated area in northwestern Barry County, Missouri, United States., and specifically to the commercial establishments operated on the northwest corner of that intersection first opened by Tommy Yonker in 1929. It is located approximately four miles west of Monett and two miles south of Pierce City. The Monett Municipal Airport is located on the southwest corner of the intersection.
