= Exeter Township, Barry County, Missouri =

Exeter Township
- Township
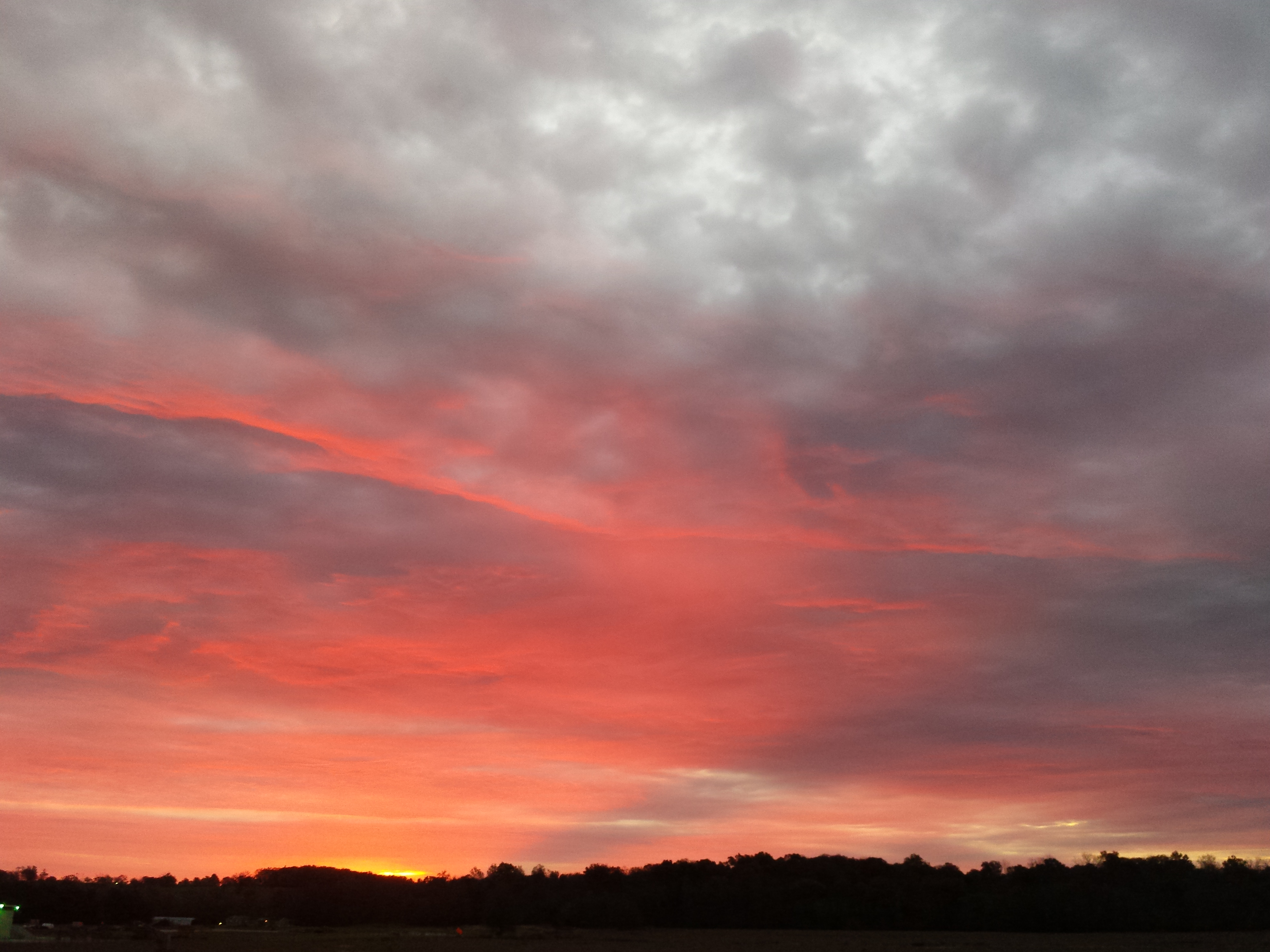

- Coordinates: 36°40′37″N 093°56′49″W
- Country: United States
- State: Missouri
- County: Barry

Area
  - Total: 23.42 sq mi (60.66 km^{2})
  - Land: 23.42 sq mi (60.65 km^{2})
  - Water: 0.0077 sq mi (0.02 km^{2}) 0.03%
- Elevation: 1,535 ft (468 m)

Population (2000)
  - Total: 1,521
  - Density: 65/sq mi (25.1/km^{2})
- FIPS code: 29-23140
- GNIS feature ID: 0766254

Exeter Township is one of twenty-five townships in Barry County, Missouri, United States. As of the 2000 census, its population was 1,521.

== Geography ==
Exeter Township covers an area of 23.42 square miles (60.7 km^{2}) and contains one incorporated settlement, Exeter. It contains three cemeteries: Crow Pond, Maplewood and McCary.
