= White River Township, Barry County, Missouri =

Township in the US state of Missouri

White River Township
- Township
- Coordinates: 36°32′17″N 093°37′49″W
- Country: United States
- State: Missouri
- County: Barry

Area
  - Total: 35.58 sq mi (92.16 km^{2})
  - Land: 29.27 sq mi (75.82 km^{2})
  - Water: 6.31 sq mi (16.35 km^{2}) 17.74%
- Elevation: 1,070 ft (326 m)

Population (2000)
  - Total: 2,434
  - Density: 83/sq mi (32.1/km^{2})
- FIPS code: 29-79522
- GNIS feature ID: 0766273

White River Township is one of twenty-five townships in Barry County, Missouri, United States. As of the 2000 census, its population was 2,434.

White River Township was established in 1841.

== Geography ==
White River Township covers an area of 35.58 square miles (92.2 km^{2}) and contains two incorporated settlements, Arrow Point, Emerald Beach, and one unincorporated community, the census-designated place of Shell Knob. It contains three cemeteries: McGuire, Viney and Viola.

The streams of Owl Creek, Rock Creek, Sweetwater Creek and Viney Creek run through this township.

== Transportation ==
White River Township contains two airports or landing strips: Bel-Voir Acres Airport and Table Rock Airport.
