= Lohmer, Missouri =

Unincorporated community in Missouri, U.S.

Coordinates: 36°39′59″N 93°42′32″W

Lohmer is an unincorporated community in Barry County, in the U.S. state of Missouri. The community is located on Missouri Route 76, east of Cassville and within the Mark Twain National Forest.

== History ==
A variant name was Lohmansburg. A post office called Lohmansburg was established in 1891, and remained in operation until 1906. The community was named after Henry Lohmar, an early settler.
