= Ozark Township, Barry County, Missouri =

Ozark Township
- Township
- Coordinates: 36°54′20″N 093°42′49″W
- Country: United States
- State: Missouri
- County: Barry

Area
  - Total: 26.33 sq mi (68.19 km^{2})
  - Land: 26.32 sq mi (68.17 km^{2})
  - Water: 0.0077 sq mi (0.02 km^{2}) 0.03%
- Elevation: 1,483 ft (452 m)

Population (2000)
  - Total: 879
  - Density: 33/sq mi (12.9/km^{2})
- FIPS code: 29-55730
- GNIS feature ID: 0766264

Ozark Township is one of twenty-five townships in Barry County, Missouri, United States. As of the 2000 census, its population was 879.

Ozark Township was organized in 1840, taking its name from the Ozark Mountains.

== Geography ==
Ozark Township covers an area of 26.33 square miles (68.2 km^{2}) and contains no incorporated settlements.

The stream of West Fork Jenkins Creek runs through this township.
