= Pleasant Ridge, Barry County, Missouri =

Unincorporated community in Missouri, U.S.

Coordinates: 36°53′47″N 93°47′30″W

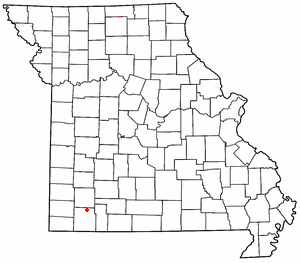

Pleasant Ridge is an unincorporated community in northern Barry County, Missouri, United States. It is located on Missouri Supplemental Routes Z and VV, seven miles east of Monett.

== History ==
Pleasant Ridge at one time was home to a small gas station and convenience store, school, church and several residences. The schoolhouse still stands on the southwest corner of the intersection of Routes Z and VV. The cannery is no longer standing, however it is believed to have been located at Tom Town close to Little Flat Creek approximately 4.5 miles south of Pleasant Ridge. There was also a mill on Little Flat Creek across from the cannery owned by John Sperandio.

The Tom Town Historic District was added to the National Register of Historic Places in 1989.

== Climate ==
The climate is characterized by relatively high temperatures and evenly distributed precipitation throughout the year. The Köppen Climate Classification subtype for this climate is "Cfa" (Humid Subtropical Climate).

Climate data for Pleasant Ridge, Missouri
Month	Jan	Feb	Mar	Apr	May	Jun	Jul	Aug	Sep	Oct	Nov	Dec	Year
Mean daily maximum °C (°F)	6 (42)	9 (48)	14 (57)	19 (67)	23 (74)	28 (82)	28 (82)	31 (88)	27 (80)	21 (69)	13 (56)	7 (45)	19 (66)
Mean daily minimum °C (°F)	−5 (23)	−3 (27)	2 (36)	7 (45)	12 (54)	17 (63)	19 (67)	19 (66)	14 (58)	8 (47)	3 (37)	−3 (26)	8 (46)
Average precipitation mm (inches)	56 (2.2)	53 (2.1)	100 (4)	110 (4.5)	130 (5.3)	140 (5.4)	89 (3.5)	86 (3.4)	130 (5.1)	97 (3.8)	100 (4.1)	71 (2.8)	1,170 (46.2)
Average precipitation days	7	7	10	10	12	10	7	7	8	8	8	7	101
Source: Weatherbase
