= Pleasant Ridge Township, Barry County, Missouri =

Township in the US state of Missouri

Pleasant Ridge Township
- Township
- Coordinates: 36°54′01″N 093°47′19″W
- Country: United States
- State: Missouri
- County: Barry

Area
  - Total: 19.34 sq mi (50.08 km^{2})
  - Land: 19.34 sq mi (50.08 km^{2})
  - Water: 0 sq mi (0 km^{2}) 0%
- Elevation: 1,480 ft (451 m)

Population (2000)
  - Total: 429
  - Density: 22/sq mi (8.6/km^{2})
- FIPS code: 29-58484
- GNIS feature ID: 0766266

Pleasant Ridge Township is one of twenty-five townships in Barry County, Missouri, United States. As of the 2000 census, its population was 429.

Pleasant Ridge Township was organized in 1887 and named for a ridge within its borders.

== Geography ==
Pleasant Ridge Township covers an area of 19.34 square miles (50.1 km^{2}) and contains no incorporated settlements. It contains one cemetery, Calton.
