= Jenkins, Missouri =

Unincorporated community in Missouri, U.S.

Coordinates: 36°46′45″N 93°41′12″W

Jenkins is an unincorporated community in Barry County, Missouri, United States. It is located on Route 39, just north of Route 248, approximately twelve miles northeast of Cassville. Jenkins Creek flows through the community and its confluence with Flat Creek is just to the south.

A post office called Jenkins was established in 1883, and remained in operation until 1965. Besides the post office, Jenkins had a schoolhouse. The community name came from Jenkins Creek which flows past southeast of the community.
