= Shell Knob, Missouri =

- Census-designated place
- Location of Shell Knob, Missouri
- Coordinates: 36°36′56″N 93°37′53″W
- Country: United States
- State: Missouri
- Counties: Barry, Stone
- Township: White River, Alpine

Area
  - Total: 12.91 sq mi (33.43 km^{2})
  - Land: 9.48 sq mi (24.55 km^{2})
  - Water: 3.43 sq mi (8.88 km^{2})
- Elevation: 915 ft (279 m)

Population (2020)
  - Total: 1,254
  - Density: 132.3/sq mi (51.08/km^{2})
- Time zone: UTC-6 (Central (CST))
  - Summer (DST): UTC-5 (CDT)
- ZIP code: 65747
- Area code: 417
- FIPS code: 29-67232
- GNIS feature ID: 2393231

Shell Knob is a census-designated place (CDP) located within White River Township, Barry County, Missouri. The population was 1,254 at the 2020 census.

The Stone County portion of Shell Knob is part of the Branson, Missouri Micropolitan Statistical Area.

== History ==
Located in the Ozark Mountains, Shell Knob was established in 1835 on the banks of the White River when Henry and Elizabeth Yoachum Schell built a trading post. The "c" was left off the name when the post office was established in 1872. The Schells left in 1846 and went on to establish the community of Jacket, Missouri. In 1959, Table Rock Dam was completed and Table Rock Lake filled.

== Geography ==
Shell Knob is located on Missouri Route 39 on the north shore of Table Rock Lake. Shell Knob is an active lake resort area on Table Rock Lake with a population of more than 1,200.

According to the United States Census Bureau, the CDP has a total area of 10.9 square miles (28.2 km^{2}), of which 8.2 square miles (21.3 km^{2}) is land and 2.6 square miles (6.8 km^{2}), or 24.25%, is water.

== Demographics ==
Historical population
Census	Pop.	Note	%±
2020	1,254		—
U.S. Decennial Census

As of the census of 2000, there were 1,393 people, 651 households, and 462 families residing in the CDP. The population density was 169.7 inhabitants per square mile (65.5/km^{2}). There were 1,022 housing units at an average density of 124.5 per square mile (48.1/km^{2}). The racial makeup of the CDP was 98.21% White, 0.36% Native American, 0.14% Pacific Islander, 0.22% from other races, and 1.08% from two or more races. Hispanic or Latino of any race were 1.44% of the population.

There were 651 households, out of which 14.9% had children under the age of 18 living with them, 63.9% were married couples living together, 4.5% had a female householder with no husband present, and 29.0% were non-families. 25.0% of all households were made up of individuals, and 16.3% had someone living alone who was 65 years of age or older. The average household size was 2.14 and the average family size was 2.51.

In the CDP, the population was spread out, with 14.9% under the age of 18, 3.8% from 18 to 24, 15.9% from 25 to 44, 33.5% from 45 to 64, and 31.9% who were 65 years of age or older. The median age was 55 years. For every 100 females, there were 94.0 males. For every 100 females age 18 and over, there were 92.1 males.

The median income for a household in the CDP was $29,896, and the median income for a family was $36,172. Males had a median income of $29,500 versus $23,438 for females. The per capita income for the CDP was $18,111. About 9.6% of families and 12.1% of the population were below the poverty line, including 24.4% of those under age 18 and 5.2% of those age 65 or over.

== Food ==
A Pizza Hut in Shell Knob is accessible by boat on the Table Rock Lake.

== Education ==
Shell Knob 78 School District operates the Shell Knob Elementary School. Shell Knob has a public library, a branch of the Barry-Lawrence Regional Library.

== Notable people ==
- Scott Cupps, member of the Missouri House of Representatives
- Scott Fitzpatrick, 47th treasurer of Missouri
- Larry Gene Taylor, member of the Missouri General Assembly
