= Mineral Spring, Missouri =

Unincorporated community in Missouri, U.S.

Coordinates: 36°40′14″N 93°46′23″W

Mineral Spring is an unincorporated community in Barry County, in the U.S. state of Missouri.

== History ==
A variant name was Panacea. A post office called Panacea was established in 1880, the name was changed to Mineral Spring in 1895, and the post office closed in 1940. The community was named for a mineral spring near the original town site.
