= Wheaton Township, Barry County, Missouri =

Township in the US state of Missouri

Wheaton Township
- Township
- Coordinates: 36°45′48″N 094°02′57″W
- Country: United States
- State: Missouri
- County: Barry

Area
  - Total: 14.59 sq mi (37.78 km^{2})
  - Land: 14.59 sq mi (37.78 km^{2})
  - Water: 0 sq mi (0 km^{2}) 0%
- Elevation: 1,410 ft (430 m)

Population (2000)
  - Total: 1,138
  - Density: 78/sq mi (30.1/km^{2})
- FIPS code: 29-79144
- GNIS feature ID: 0766272

Wheaton Township is one of twenty-five townships in Barry County, Missouri, United States. As of the 2000 census, its population was 1,138.

== Geography ==
Wheaton Township covers an area of 14.59 square miles (37.8 km^{2}) and contains one incorporated settlement, Wheaton.

The streams of Joyce Creek, Pogue Creek and Woodward Creek run through this township.
