= McDonald Township, Barry County, Missouri =

Township in the US state of Missouri

McDonald Township
- Township
- Coordinates: 36°46′18″N 093°48′24″W
- Country: United States
- State: Missouri
- County: Barry

Area
  - Total: 38.05 sq mi (98.54 km^{2})
  - Land: 38.05 sq mi (98.54 km^{2})
  - Water: 0 sq mi (0 km^{2}) 0%
- Elevation: 1,224 ft (373 m)

Population (2000)
  - Total: 882
  - Density: 23/sq mi (9/km^{2})
- FIPS code: 29-44912
- GNIS feature ID: 0766259

McDonald Township is one of twenty-five townships in Barry County, Missouri, United States. As of the 2000 census, its population was 882.

The settlement of McDonald was laid out in 1841. Named after a settler family, it was the county seat for a brief period. A post office called McDonald was in operation from 1840 to 1854.

== Geography ==
McDonald Township covers an area of 38.04 square miles (98.5 km^{2}) and contains no incorporated settlements. It contains two cemeteries: Bullington and Sparks.
