= Eagle Rock, Missouri =

- Census-designated place & unincorporated community
- Location within Missouri
- Coordinates: 36°33′00″N 93°45′16″W
- Country: United States
- State: Missouri
- County: Barry

Area
  - Total: 2.76 sq mi (7.14 km^{2})
  - Land: 2.34 sq mi (6.05 km^{2})
  - Water: 0.42 sq mi (1.09 km^{2})
- Elevation: 984 ft (300 m)

Population (2020)
  - Total: 193
  - Density: 82.7/sq mi (31.92/km^{2})
- Time zone: UTC-6 (Central (CST))
  - Summer (DST): UTC-5 (CDT)
- Area code: 417
- GNIS feature ID: 2587065

Eagle Rock is an unincorporated community and census-designated place in Barry County, Missouri, United States. As of the 2020 census, it had a population of 193.

It is located on Missouri Route 86 near Table Rock Lake. Eagle Rock has a state campground and public marina.

A post office called Eagle Rock has been in operation since 1886. The community takes its name from a nearby rock formation.

The Eagle Rock Retreat Center, home of the Assembly of God youth organizations Royal Rangers National Training Center, is located approximately 4 miles southwest of Eagle Rock.

== Demographics ==
Historical population
| Census | Pop. | Note | %± |
|---|---|---|---|
| 2020 | 193 | | — |
U.S. Decennial Census

== Education ==
It is in the Cassville R-IV School District.

Eagle Rock has a public library, a branch of the Barry-Lawrence Regional Library.
