= Golden, Missouri =

Unincorporated community in Missouri, U.S.

- Census-designated place & unincorporated community
- Location within Missouri
- Coordinates: 36°31′27″N 93°39′14″W
- Country: United States
- State: Missouri
- County: Barry

Area
  - Total: 5.72 sq mi (14.81 km^{2})
  - Land: 5.33 sq mi (13.80 km^{2})
  - Water: 0.39 sq mi (1.01 km^{2})
- Elevation: 1,066 ft (325 m)

Population (2020)
  - Total: 275
  - Density: 51.6/sq mi (19.93/km^{2})
- Time zone: UTC-6 (Central (CST))
  - Summer (DST): UTC-5 (CDT)
- ZIP code: 65658
- Area code: 417
- GNIS feature ID: 2587074

Golden is an unincorporated community and census-designated place in southeastern Barry County, Missouri, United States. It is approximately 20 miles (32 km) southeast of Cassville. It is located south of Table Rock Lake and one mile north of Missouri Route 86 on Highway J. At the 2020 census, Golden had a population of 275.

A post office called Golden has been in operation since 1876. The community most likely was named after the local Golden family.

== Demographics ==
Historical population
Census	Pop.	Note	%±
2020	275		—
U.S. Decennial Census

== Education ==
It is in the Cassville R-IV School District.
