= Madry, Missouri =

Unincorporated community in Missouri, U.S.

Coordinates: 36°52′10″N 93°43′13″W

Madry is an unincorporated community in northeast Barry County, in the U.S. state of Missouri. The community is located on Missouri Route 39, approximately 6.5 miles south of Aurora.

== History ==
A post office called Madry was established in 1892, and remained in operation until 1918. The community was named after A. H. Madry, the original owner of the town site.
