= Ash Township, Barry County, Missouri =

Township in the U.S. state of Missouri

Ash Township
- Township
- Coordinates: 36°33′29″N 094°01′38″W
- Country: United States
- State: Missouri
- County: Barry

Area
  - Total: 41.30 sq mi (106.97 km^{2})
  - Land: 41.30 sq mi (106.96 km^{2})
  - Water: 0.0039 sq mi (0.01 km^{2}) 0.01%
- Elevation: 1,434 ft (437 m)

Population (2000)
  - Total: 876
  - Density: 21/sq mi (8.2/km^{2})
- FIPS code: 29-02116
- GNIS feature ID: 0766249

Ash Township is one of twenty-five townships in Barry County, Missouri, United States. As of the 2000 census, its population was 876.

Ash Township was established in 1870, and named after an early settler with the surname Ash.

== Geography ==
Ash Township covers an area of 41.3 square miles (107 km^{2}) and contains no incorporated settlements.

The stream of Greasy Creek runs through this township.
