= Jenkins Township, Barry County, Missouri =

Jenkins Township
- Township
- Coordinates: 36°46′50″N 093°41′12″W
- Country: United States
- State: Missouri
- County: Barry

Area
  - Total: 28.26 sq mi (73.19 km^{2})
  - Land: 28.26 sq mi (73.19 km^{2})
  - Water: 0 sq mi (0 km^{2}) 0%
- Elevation: 1,142 ft (348 m)

Population (2000)
  - Total: 382
  - Density: 13/sq mi (5.2/km^{2})
- FIPS code: 29-37142
- GNIS feature ID: 0766256

Jenkins Township is one of twenty-five townships in Barry County, Missouri, United States. As of the 2000 census, its population was 382.

== Geography ==
Jenkins Township covers an area of 28.26 square miles (73.2 km^{2}) and contains no incorporated settlements. It contains five cemeteries: Clio, Coones, Kane, Potter and Stubblefield.

The streams of Bailey Branch, Blacksmith Branch, Brantley Branch, Coon Creek, Jacks Branch and Jenkins Creek run through this township.
