= Butterfield, Missouri =

City in Barry County, Missouri, United States

- City
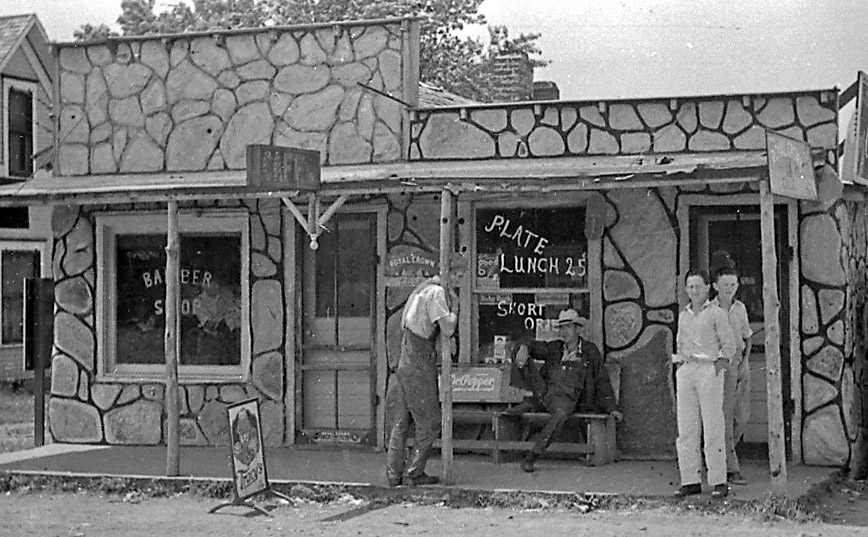
- Butterfield, 1939

- Location of Butterfield, Missouri
- Coordinates: 36°44′56″N 93°54′16″W
- Country: United States
- State: Missouri
- County: Barry
- Township: Butterfield

Area
  - Total: 0.46 sq mi (1.20 km^{2})
  - Land: 0.46 sq mi (1.20 km^{2})
  - Water: 0 sq mi (0.00 km^{2})
- Elevation: 1,532 ft (467 m)

Population (2020)
  - Total: 378
  - Density: 815.7/sq mi (314.93/km^{2})
- Time zone: UTC-6 (Central (CST))
  - Summer (DST): UTC-5 (CDT)
- ZIP code: 65623
- Area code: 417
- FIPS code: 29-10144
- GNIS feature ID: 2397515
- Website: cityofbutterfield.com

Butterfield is a city in Butterfield Township, Barry County, Missouri, United States. The population was 378 at the 2020 census.

== History ==
Butterfield was platted in 1883. The town has the name of Fredrick Butterfield, a railroad official.

== Geography ==
Butterfield is located along Missouri Route U one half mile east of Missouri Route 37. Purdy is approximately 4.5 miles to the north and Cassville is five miles to the south. The headwaters of Gunter Creek arise just south of the community.

According to the United States Census Bureau, the village has a total area of 0.46 square miles (1.19 km^{2}), all land.

== Demographics ==
Historical population
Census	Pop.	Note	%±
1940	150		—
1950	136		−9.3%
1960	125		−8.1%
1970	125		0.0%
1980	234		87.2%
1990	248		6.0%
2000	397		60.1%
2010	470		18.4%
2020	378		−19.6%
U.S. Decennial Census

=== 2010 census ===
As of the census of 2010, there were 470 people, 146 households, and 118 families living in the village. The population density was 1,021.7 inhabitants per square mile (394.5/km^{2}). There were 185 housing units at an average density of 402.2 per square mile (155.3/km^{2}). The racial makeup of the village was 79.4% White, 0.2% African American, 1.7% Native American, 1.9% Asian, 13.4% from other races, and 3.4% from two or more races. Hispanic or Latino of any race were 26.8% of the population.

There were 146 households, of which 52.1% had children under the age of 18 living with them, 61.6% were married couples living together, 14.4% had a female householder with no husband present, 4.8% had a male householder with no wife present, and 19.2% were non-families. 15.1% of all households were made up of individuals, and 6.2% had someone living alone who was 65 years of age or older. The average household size was 3.22 and the average family size was 3.54.

The median age in the village was 30 years. 36.4% of residents were under the age of 18; 9.5% were between the ages of 18 and 24; 24.2% were from 25 to 44; 22.1% were from 45 to 64; and 7.7% were 65 years of age or older. The gender makeup of the village was 48.5% male and 51.5% female.

=== 2000 census ===
As of the census of 2000, there were 397 people, 136 households, and 102 families living in the village. The population density was 947.6 inhabitants per square mile (365.9/km^{2}). There were 149 housing units at an average density of 355.7 per square mile (137.3/km^{2}). The racial makeup of the village was 85.14% White, 0.50% African American, 0.50% Native American, 11.59% from other races, and 2.27% from two or more races. Hispanic or Latino of any race were 21.41% of the population.

There were 136 households, out of which 43.4% had children under the age of 18 living with them, 56.6% were married couples living together, 13.2% had a female householder with no husband present, and 24.3% were non-families. 22.1% of all households were made up of individuals, and 9.6% had someone living alone who was 65 years of age or older. The average household size was 2.92 and the average family size was 3.44.

In the village, the population was spread out, with 34.0% under the age of 18, 11.8% from 18 to 24, 28.2% from 25 to 44, 20.2% from 45 to 64, and 5.8% who were 65 years of age or older. The median age was 28 years. For every 100 females, there were 98.5 males. For every 100 females age 18 and over, there were 98.5 males.

The median income for a household in the village was $24,706, and the median income for a family was $28,000. Males had a median income of $20,417 versus $18,750 for females. The per capita income for the village was $9,460. About 19.8% of families and 19.9% of the population were below the poverty line, including 25.2% of those under age 18 and 28.6% of those age 65 or over.

== Education ==
It is in the Cassville R-IV School District.

== See also ==
- List of cities in Missouri
