= Mineral Township, Barry County, Missouri =

Mineral Township
- Township
- Coordinates: 36°42′40″N 093°42′06″W
- Country: United States
- State: Missouri
- County: Barry

Area
  - Total: 60.59 sq mi (156.94 km^{2})
  - Land: 60.59 sq mi (156.92 km^{2})
  - Water: 0.0077 sq mi (0.02 km^{2}) 0.01%
- Elevation: 1,155 ft (352 m)

Population (2000)
  - Total: 886
  - Density: 15/sq mi (5.6/km^{2})
- FIPS code: 29-48674
- GNIS feature ID: 0766261

Mineral Township is one of twenty-five townships in Barry County, Missouri, United States. As of the 2000 census, its population was 886.

== Geography ==
Mineral Township covers an area of 60.6 square miles (157 km^{2}) and contains no incorporated settlements. It contains three cemeteries: Ennis, Pierce and Snyder.

The streams of Fortune Branch, Rockhouse Creek and Williams Branch run through this township.

== Transportation ==
Mineral Township contains one airport or landing strip, Timber Line Airpark.
