= Pioneer Township, Barry County, Missouri =

Pioneer Township
- Township
- Coordinates: 36°50′00″N 094°03′04″W
- Country: United States
- State: Missouri
- County: Barry

Area
  - Total: 9.09 sq mi (23.54 km^{2})
  - Land: 9.09 sq mi (23.54 km^{2})
  - Water: 0 sq mi (0 km^{2}) 0%
- Elevation: 1,201 ft (366 m)

Population (2000)
  - Total: 186
  - Density: 20/sq mi (7.9/km^{2})
- FIPS code: 29-57962
- GNIS feature ID: 0766265

Pioneer Township is one of twenty-five townships in Barry County, Missouri, United States. As of the 2000 census, its population was 186.

== Geography ==
Pioneer Township covers an area of 9.09 square miles (23.5 km^{2}) and contains no incorporated settlements.
