= Wheelerville, Missouri =

Unincorporated community in Missouri, U.S.

Coordinates: 36°50′10″N 93°37′46″W

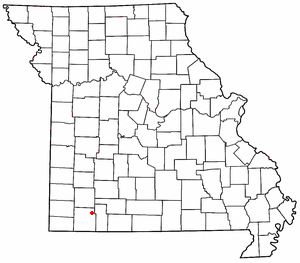

Wheelerville is an unincorporated community in northeastern Barry County, Missouri, United States. It is located at the intersection of Route 248 and Route D, approximately eight miles west-northwest of Galena in adjacent Stone County.

Wheelerville's ZIP code is 65605.
