= Wheaton, Missouri =

- City
- Location of Wheaton, Missouri
- Coordinates: 36°45′44″N 94°3′18″W
- Country: United States
- State: Missouri
- County: Barry
- Township: Wheaton

Area
  - Total: 0.51 sq mi (1.32 km^{2})
  - Land: 0.51 sq mi (1.32 km^{2})
  - Water: 0 sq mi (0.00 km^{2})
- Elevation: 1,371 ft (418 m)

Population (2020)
  - Total: 672
  - Density: 1,322.3/sq mi (510.54/km^{2})
- Time zone: UTC-6 (Central (CST))
  - Summer (DST): UTC-5 (CDT)
- ZIP code: 64874
- Area code: 417
- FIPS code: 29-79126
- GNIS feature ID: 2397296
- Website: www.cityofwheaton.mo.citygovt.org

Wheaton is a city in Wheaton Township, Barry County, Missouri, United States. As of the 2020 census, Wheaton had a population of 672.

== History ==
The Missouri and North Arkansas Railroad previously served the city and their Wheaton Depot was added to the National Register of Historic Places in 2000.

The Wheaton Barbeque is a long-standing summer community event at Wheaton Park.

== Geography ==
Wheaton is located in western Barry County adjacent to the Barry-Newton county line. The community is located on Route 86 one mile north of Missouri Route 76.

According to the United States Census Bureau, the city has a total area of 0.51 square miles (1.32 km^{2}), all land.

== Demographics ==
Historical population
Census	Pop.	Note	%±
1920	374		—
1930	359		−4.0%
1940	393		9.5%
1950	394		0.3%
1960	341		−13.5%
1970	360		5.6%
1980	548		52.2%
1990	637		16.2%
2000	721		13.2%
2010	696		−3.5%
2020	672		−3.4%
U.S. Decennial Census

=== 2010 census ===
As of the census of 2010, there were 696 people, 274 households, and 175 families living in the city. The population density was 1,364.7 inhabitants per square mile (526.9/km^{2}). There were 333 housing units at an average density of 652.9 per square mile (252.1/km^{2}). The racial makeup of the city was 89.8% White, 0.1% African American, 0.7% Native American, 1.4% Asian, 5.2% from other races, and 2.7% from two or more races. Hispanic or Latino of any race were 7.5% of the population.

There were 274 households, of which 35.8% had children under the age of 18 living with them, 45.6% were married couples living together, 15.3% had a female householder with no husband present, 2.9% had a male householder with no wife present, and 36.1% were non-families. 32.8% of all households were made up of individuals, and 15.7% had someone living alone who was 65 years of age or older. The average household size was 2.54 and the average family size was 3.17.

The median age in the city was 35.8 years. 29.5% of residents were under the age of 18; 8.1% were between the ages of 18 and 24; 23.9% were from 25 to 44; 24.7% were from 45 to 64; and 13.6% were 65 years of age or older. The gender makeup of the city was 46.1% male and 53.9% female.

=== 2000 census ===
As of the census of 2000, there were 721 people, 285 households, and 196 families living in the city. The population density was 1,420.3 inhabitants per square mile (548.4/km^{2}). There were 318 housing units at an average density of 626.4 per square mile (241.9/km^{2}). The racial makeup of the city was 92.37% White, 0.14% African American, 0.83% Native American, 4.58% from other races, and 2.08% from two or more races. Hispanic or Latino of any race were 8.74% of the population.

There were 285 households, out of which 36.8% had children under the age of 18 living with them, 54.4% were married couples living together, 10.5% had a female householder with no husband present, and 30.9% were non-families. 27.4% of all households were made up of individuals, and 18.2% had someone living alone who was 65 years of age or older. The average household size was 2.53 and the average family size was 3.05.

In the city, the population was spread out, with 28.8% under the age of 18, 12.1% from 18 to 24, 25.7% from 25 to 44, 16.9% from 45 to 64, and 16.5% who were 65 years of age or older. The median age was 32 years. For every 100 females, there were 87.8 males. For every 100 females age 18 and over, there were 85.2 males.

The median income for a household in the city was $21,354, and the median income for a family was $26,058. Males had a median income of $22,750 versus $16,827 for females. The per capita income for the city was $11,124. About 18.2% of families and 20.8% of the population were below the poverty line, including 25.4% of those under age 18 and 20.5% of those age 65 or over.
