= Purdy, Missouri =

City in Purdy County, Missouri, United States

- City
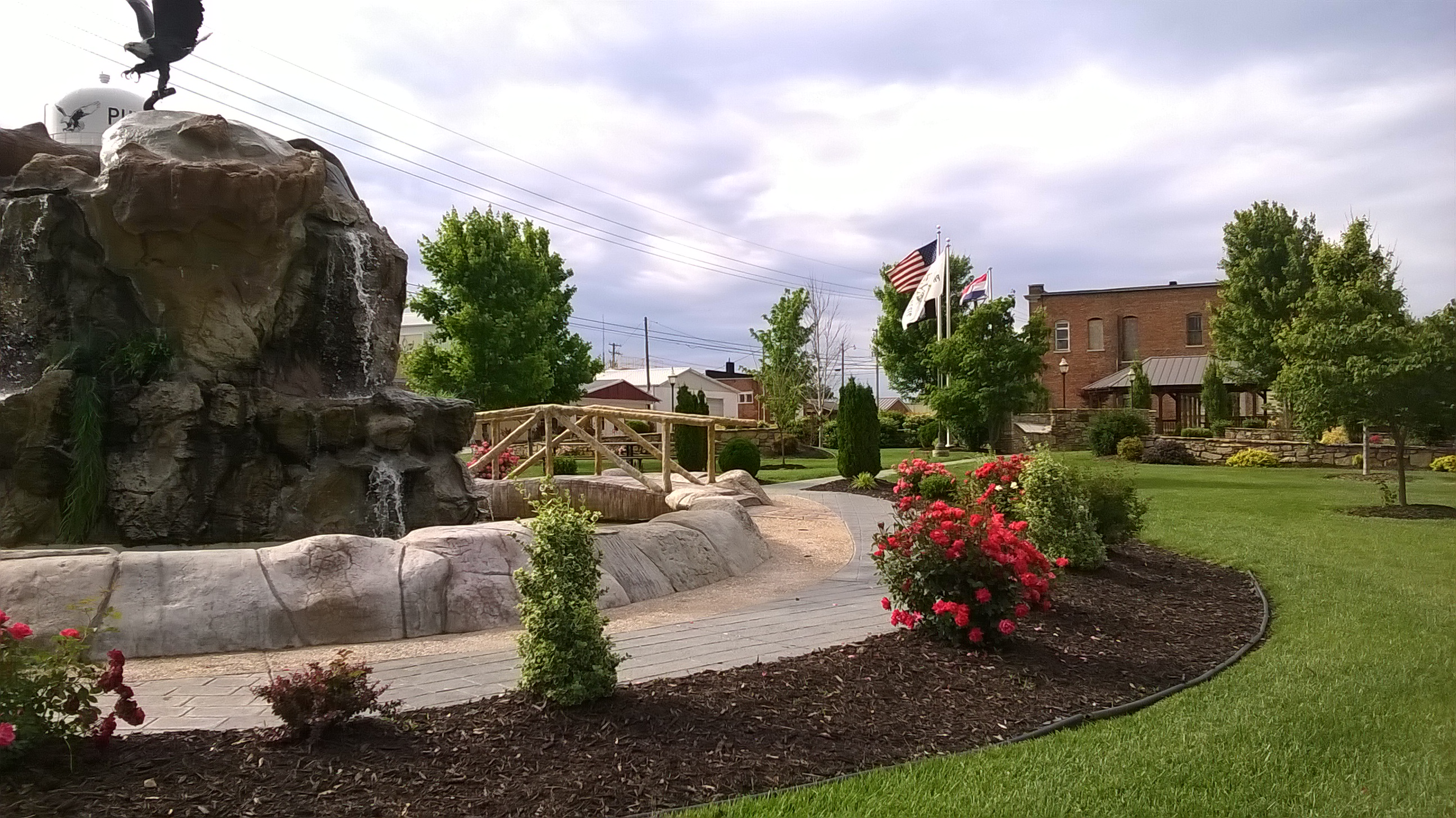

- Seal

- Location of Purdy, Missouri
- Coordinates: 36°49′7″N 93°55′15″W
- Country: United States
- State: Missouri
- County: Barry
- Township: Purdy
- Established: 1880

Government
  - Mayor: Brian Bowers

Area
  - Total: 0.64 sq mi (1.67 km^{2})
  - Land: 0.64 sq mi (1.67 km^{2})
  - Water: 0 sq mi (0.00 km^{2})
- Elevation: 1,473 ft (449 m)

Population (2020)
  - Total: 1,031
  - Estimate (2024): 1,052
  - Density: 1,598.45/sq mi (617.16/km^{2})
- Time zone: UTC-6 (Central (CST))
  - Summer (DST): UTC-5 (CDT)
- ZIP code: 65734
- Area code: 417
- FIPS code: 29-60176
- GNIS Feature ID: 2396294
- Website: cityofpurdy.com

Purdy is a city in Purdy Township, Barry County, Missouri, United States, on the foothills of the Ozarks, eight miles (13 km) south of Monett and twelve miles (19 km) north of Cassville along Highway 37. The population was 1,028 at the 2020 census.

== History ==
Purdy was platted in 1880. The city was named for George A. Purdy, a railroad promoter. A post office called Purdy has been in operation since 1880.

US Department of the Interior Original Surveys and USGS Topographical map showing the Butterfield Overland Mail Route.

== Geography ==
According to the United States Census Bureau, the city has a total area of 0.65 square miles (1.68 km^{2}), all land.

== Demographics ==
Historical population
Census	Pop.	Note	%±
1890	325		—
1900	434		33.5%
1910	459		5.8%
1920	442		−3.7%
1930	436		−1.4%
1940	488		11.9%
1950	437		−10.5%
1960	467		6.9%
1970	588		25.9%
1980	928		57.8%
1990	977		5.3%
2000	1,103		12.9%
2010	1,098		−0.5%
2020	1,031		−6.1%
U.S. Decennial Census

=== 2010 census ===
As of the census of 2010, there were 1,098 people, 399 households, and 271 families living in the city. The population density was 1,689.2 inhabitants per square mile (652.2/km^{2}). There were 452 housing units at an average density of 695.4 per square mile (268.5/km^{2}). The racial makeup of the city was 81.9% White, 1.3% Native American, 1.5% Asian, 11.8% from other races, and 3.5% from two or more races. Hispanic or Latino people of any race were 26.0% of the population.

There were 399 households, of which 40.9% had children under the age of 18 living with them, 49.1% were married couples living together, 13.0% had a female householder with no husband present, 5.8% had a male householder with no wife present, and 32.1% were non-families. 28.8% of all households were made up of individuals, and 13.1% had someone living alone who was 65 years of age or older. The average household size was 2.75 and the average family size was 3.40.

The median age in the city was 34.1 years. 31.4% of residents were under the age of 18; 8% were between the ages of 18 and 24; 24.9% were from 25 to 44; 23% were from 45 to 64; and 12.6% were 65 years of age or older. The gender makeup of the city was 48.5% male and 51.5% female.

=== 2000 census ===
As of the census of 2000, there were 1,103 people, 432 households, and 288 families living in the city. The population density was 1,697.4 inhabitants per square mile (655.4/km^{2}). There were 480 housing units at an average density of 738.7 per square mile (285.2/km^{2}). The racial makeup of the city was 81.50% White, 0.09% African American, 0.73% Native American, 0.18% Asian, 14.69% from other races, and 2.81% from two or more races. Hispanic or Latino people of any race were 18.04% of the population.

There were 432 households, out of which 35.0% had children under the age of 18 living with them, 50.5% were married couples living together, 11.8% had a female householder with no husband present, and 33.3% were non-families. 30.3% of all households were made up of individuals, and 19.7% had someone living alone who was 65 years of age or older. The average household size was 2.55 and the average family size was 3.20.

In the city the population was spread out, with 29.7% under the age of 18, 8.8% from 18 to 24, 25.8% from 25 to 44, 18.9% from 45 to 64, and 16.7% who were 65 years of age or older. The median age was 34 years. For every 100 females, there were 89.5 males. For every 100 females age 18 and over, there were 81.1 males.

The median income for a household in the city was $24,318, and the median income for a family was $28,636. Males had a median income of $21,731 versus $16,806 for females. The per capita income for the city was $10,662. About 14.6% of families and 20.2% of the population were below the poverty line, including 25.8% of those under age 18 and 24.5% of those age 65 or over.

== Education ==
Purdy R-II School District operates one elementary school, one middle school, and Purdy High School.

Dancing is not allowed in the Purdy school without permission from the school board. The authority of the school board was upheld by the US Supreme Court in 1990 when it refused to hear a challenge by a group of students and parents.

== Notable person ==
- Phil Mulkey - track and field athlete

== See also ==
- List of cities in Missouri
