= Barry County, Missouri =

County in Missouri, United States

- County
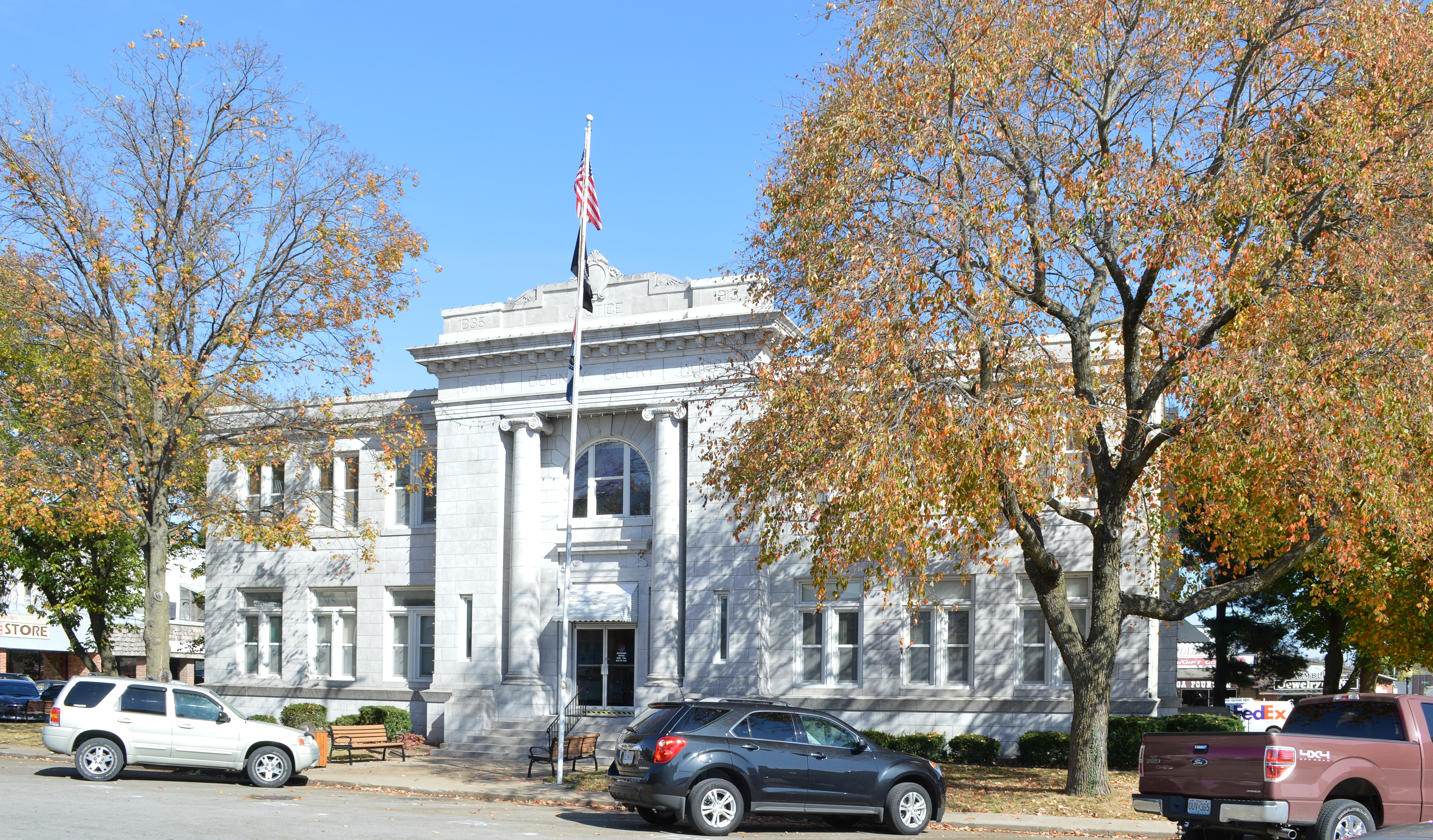
- The Barry County Courthouse in Cassville

- Location within the U.S. state of Missouri
- Coordinates: 36°43′N 93°50′W
- Country: United States
- State: Missouri
- Founded: January 5, 1835
- Named for: William Taylor Barry
- Seat: Cassville
- Largest city: Monett

Area
  - Total: 791 sq mi (2,050 km^{2})
  - Land: 778 sq mi (2,020 km^{2})
  - Water: 13 sq mi (34 km^{2}) 1.6%

Population (2020)
  - Total: 34,534
  - Estimate (2025): 36,200 ▲
  - Density: 44.4/sq mi (17.1/km^{2})
- Time zone: UTC−6 (Central)
  - Summer (DST): UTC−5 (CDT)
- Congressional district: 7th
- Website: www.barrycountymo.gov

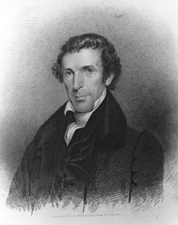
William Taylor Barry

Barry County is a county located in the southwest portion of the U.S. state of Missouri. As of the 2020 Census, the population was 34,534. Its county seat is Cassville. The county was organized in 1835 and named after William Taylor Barry, a U.S. Postmaster General from Kentucky. The town of Barry, also named after the postmaster-general, was located just north of Kansas City, not in Barry County.

== Geography ==
According to the U.S. Census Bureau, the county has a total area of 791 square miles (2,050 km^{2}), of which 778 square miles (2,020 km^{2}) is land and 13 square miles (34 km^{2}) (1.6%) is water. Roaring River State Park is located in the southern part of the county, amid the Mark Twain National Forest.

=== Adjacent counties ===
- Lawrence County (north)
- Stone County (east)
- Carroll County, Arkansas (southeast)
- Benton County, Arkansas (south)
- McDonald County (southwest)
- Newton County (northwest)

=== Major highways ===
- U.S. Route 60
- Route 37
- Route 39
- Route 76
- Route 86
- Route 97
- Route 248

=== National protected area ===
- Mark Twain National Forest (part)

== Demographics ==
Historical population
Census	Pop.	Note	%±
1840	4,745		—
1850	3,467		−26.9%
1860	7,995		130.6%
1870	10,373		29.7%
1880	14,405		38.9%
1890	22,943		59.3%
1900	25,532		11.3%
1910	23,869		−6.5%
1920	23,473		−1.7%
1930	22,803		−2.9%
1940	23,546		3.3%
1950	21,755		−7.6%
1960	18,921		−13.0%
1970	19,597		3.6%
1980	24,408		24.5%
1990	27,547		12.9%
2000	34,010		23.5%
2010	35,597		4.7%
2020	34,534		−3.0%
2025 (est.)	36,200	▲	4.8%
U.S. Decennial Census; 1790–1960 1900–1990; 1990–2000 2010–2015

=== Racial and ethnic composition ===
Barry County, Missouri – Racial and ethnic composition Note: the US Census treats Hispanic/Latino as an ethnic category. This table excludes Latinos from the racial categories and assigns them to a separate category. Hispanics/Latinos may be of any race.
Race / Ethnicity (NH = Non-Hispanic)	Pop 1980	Pop 1990	Pop 2000	Pop 2010	Pop 2020	% 1980	% 1990	% 2000	% 2010	% 2020
White alone (NH)	24,076	27,030	31,486	31,505	28,058	98.64%	98.12%	92.58%	88.50%	81.25%
Black or African American alone (NH)	5	24	30	87	102	0.02%	0.09%	0.09%	0.24%	0.30%
Native American or Alaska Native alone (NH)	112	266	279	289	316	0.46%	0.97%	0.82%	0.81%	0.92%
Asian alone (NH)	70	73	86	459	808	0.29%	0.27%	0.25%	1.29%	2.34%
Native Hawaiian or Pacific Islander alone (NH)	x	x	10	6	70	x	x	0.03%	0.02%	0.20%
Other race alone (NH)	28	2	4	8	81	0.11%	0.01%	0.01%	0.02%	0.23%
Mixed race or Multiracial (NH)	x	x	402	498	1,766	x	x	1.18%	1.40%	5.11%
Hispanic or Latino (any race)	117	152	1,713	2,745	3,333	0.48%	0.55%	5.04%	7.71%	9.65%
Total	24,408	27,547	34,010	35,597	34,534	100.00%	100.00%	100.00%	100.00%	100.00%

=== 2020 census ===
As of the 2020 census, the county had a population of 34,534. The median age was 43.1 years. 23.0% of residents were under the age of 18 and 21.1% of residents were 65 years of age or older. For every 100 females there were 101.1 males, and for every 100 females age 18 and over there were 99.3 males age 18 and over. 17.5% of residents lived in urban areas, while 82.5% lived in rural areas.

The racial makeup of the county was 83.0% White, 0.3% Black or African American, 1.3% American Indian and Alaska Native, 2.3% Asian, 0.2% Native Hawaiian and Pacific Islander, 4.9% from some other race, and 7.9% from two or more races. Hispanic or Latino residents of any race comprised 9.7% of the population.

There were 13,720 households in the county, of which 28.8% had children under the age of 18 living with them and 22.3% had a female householder with no spouse or partner present. About 26.5% of all households were made up of individuals and 12.6% had someone living alone who was 65 years of age or older.

There were 16,990 housing units, of which 19.2% were vacant. Among occupied housing units, 73.7% were owner-occupied and 26.3% were renter-occupied. The homeowner vacancy rate was 2.1% and the rental vacancy rate was 9.0%.

Barry County Racial Composition
Race	Num.	Perc.
White (NH)	28,058	81.3%
Black or African American (NH)	102	0.3%
Native American (NH)	316	1%
Asian (NH)	808	2.34%
Pacific Islander (NH)	70	0.2%
Other/Mixed (NH)	1,847	5.4%
Hispanic or Latino	3,333	9.7%

=== 2000 census ===
As of the 2000 census, there were 34,010 people, 13,398 households, and 9,579 families residing in the county. The population density was 44 people per square mile (17 people/km^{2}). There were 15,964 housing units at an average density of 20 units per square mile (7.7/km^{2}). The racial makeup of the county was 94.09% White, 0.11% Black or African American, 0.86% Native American, 0.27% Asian, 0.03% Pacific Islander, 3.25% from other races, and 1.38% from two or more races. Approximately 5.04% of the population were Hispanic or Latino of any race. 26.5% were of American, 15.5% German, 11.7% English and 10.4% Irish ancestry.

There were 13,398 households, out of which 31.20% had children under the age of 18 living with them, 59.30% were married couples living together, 8.40% had a female householder with no husband present, and 28.50% were non-families. 24.70% of all households were made up of individuals, and 11.60% had someone living alone who was 65 years of age or older. The average household size was 2.51 and the average family size was 2.98.

In the county, the population was spread out, with 26.10% under the age of 18, 7.80% from 18 to 24, 26.10% from 25 to 44, 23.90% from 45 to 64, and 16.10% who were 65 years of age or older. The median age was 38 years. For every 100 females there were 98.30 males. For every 100 females age 18 and over, there were 95.60 males.

The median income for a household in the county was $28,906, and the median income for a family was $34,043. Males had a median income of $25,381 versus $18,631 for females. The per capita income for the county was $14,980. About 11.80% of families and 16.60% of the population were below the poverty line, including 23.50% of those under age 18 and 11.90% of those age 65 or over.

=== Religion ===
According to the Association of Religion Data Archives County Membership Report (2010), Barry County is regarded as being a part of the Bible Belt, with evangelical Protestantism being the most predominant religion. The most predominant denominations among residents in Barry County who adhere to a religion are Southern Baptists (50.27%), Roman Catholics (19.26%), and United Methodists (4.67%).

== Education ==
=== Public schools ===
- Cassville R-IV School District – Cassville
  - Eunice Thomas Elementary School (PK-02)
  - Cassville Intermediate School (03-05)
  - Cassville Middle School (06-08)
  - Cassville High School (09-12)
- Exeter R-VI School District – Exeter
  - Exeter Elementary School (K-08)
  - Exeter High School (09-12)
- Monett R-I School District – Monett
  - Monett Elementary School (PK-02)
  - Central Park Elementary School (03-04)
  - Monett Intermediate School (05-06)
  - Monett Middle School (07-08)
  - Monett High School (09-12)
- Purdy R-II School District Purdy
  - Purdy Elementary School (K-04)
  - Purdy Middle School (05-08)
  - Purdy High School (09-12)
- Shell Knob School District No. 78 – Shell Knob
  - Shell Knob Elementary School (K-08)
- Southwest R-V School District Washburn
  - Southwest Elementary School (PK-04)
  - Southwest Middle School (05-08)
  - Southwest High School (09-12)
- Wheaton R-III School District – Wheaton
  - Wheaton Elementary School (PK-06)
  - Wheaton High School (07-12)

=== Private schools ===
- St. Lawrence Catholic School – Monett (K-06) – Roman Catholic

=== Public libraries ===
- Barry-Lawrence Regional Library

== Communities ==
=== Cities ===
- Cassville (county seat)
- Exeter
- Monett
- Pierce City
- Purdy
- Seligman
- Washburn
- Wheaton

=== Villages ===
- Arrow Point
- Butterfield
- Chain-O-Lakes
- Emerald Beach

=== Census-designated places ===
- Eagle Rock
- Golden
- Shell Knob (partly in Stone County)

=== Other unincorporated communities ===
- Cato
- Corsicana
- Jenkins
- Leann
- Lohmer
- Madry
- Mayflower
- McDowell
- Mineral Spring
- Osa
- Pasley
- Pioneer
- Pleasant Ridge
- Pulaskifield
- Ridgely
- Scholten
- Travers
- Viola
- Wheelerville
- Yonkerville

=== Townships ===
Barry County is divided into 25 townships:

- Ash
- Butterfield
- Capps Creek
- Corsicana
- Crane Creek
- Exeter
- Flat Creek
- Jenkins
- Kings Prairie
- Liberty
- McDonald
- McDowell
- Mineral
- Monett
- Mountain
- Ozark
- Pioneer
- Pleasant Ridge
- Purdy
- Roaring River
- Shell Knob
- Sugar Creek
- Washburn
- Wheaton
- White River

== Notable people ==
- Clete Boyer – Major League Baseball player
- Scott Fitzpatrick – Missouri State Treasurer (2019–present)
- Don Johnson – Actor
- Curtis F. Marbut – Director of the Soil Survey Division of the U.S. Department of Agriculture (1913–1935)

== Politics ==
=== Local ===
Republicans control politics at the local level in Barry County, holding every elected position in the county.

Barry County, Missouri

Elected countywide officials
Assessor	Sherry Smith	Republican
Circuit Clerk	Craig Williams	Republican
County Clerk	Joyce Ennis	Republican
Collector	Skyler Bowman	Republican
Commissioner (presiding)	Steve Blankenship	Republican
Commissioner (northern district)	Gary Schad	Republican
Commissioner (southern district)	Gene Robbins	Republican
Coroner	Gary Swearingen	Republican
Prosecuting Attorney	Amy Boxx	Republican
Public Administrator	Sam Madsen	Republican
Recorder	Danielle Still	Republican
Sheriff	Danny Boyd	Republican
Treasurer	Gretta Tripp	Republican

=== State ===
Past Gubernatorial Elections Results
Year	Republican	Democratic	Third Parties
2024	79.79% 12,721	18.31% 2,920	1.91% 303
2020	79.57% 12,356	18.03% 2,841	2.13% 331
2016	68.09% 9,943	28.50% 4,161	3.41% 498
2012	56.68% 7,769	40.06% 5,491	3.25% 446
2008	49.48% 7,156	47.90% 6,928	2.62% 379
2004	68.97% 9,594	29.81% 4,147	1.22% 170
2000	59.91% 7,352	38.14% 4,681	1.95% 239
1996	55.84% 6,574	41.28% 4,859	2.88% 339
1992	52.56% 6,529	47.44% 5,893	0.00% 0

All of Barry County is a part of Missouri's 158th Legislative District in the Missouri House of Representatives and is represented by Scott Cupps (R-Shell Knob).

Missouri House of Representatives — District 158 — Barry County (2020)
Party	Candidate	Votes	%	±%
Republican	Scott Cupps	12,408	81.35%	−1.24
Democratic	Brenda McKinney	2,845	18.65%	+1.24

Missouri House of Representatives — District 158 Special Election — Barry County (2019)
Party	Candidate	Votes	%	±%
Republican	Scott Cupps	1,798	82.59%	−17.41
Democratic	Lisa Kalp	379	17.41%	+17.41

All of Barry County is a part of Missouri's 29th District in the Missouri Senate and is currently represented by Mike Moon (R-Ash Grove).

Missouri Senate — District 29 — Barry County (2020)
Party	Candidate	Votes	%	±%
Republican	Mike Moon	13,499	100.00%	±0.00

Missouri Senate — District 29 — Barry County (2016)
Party	Candidate	Votes	%	±%
Republican	David Sater	13,239	100.00%	±0.00

=== Federal ===
All of Barry County is included in Missouri's 7th Congressional District and is currently represented by Eric Burlison (R-Ozark) in the U.S. House of Representatives.

U.S. House of Representatives — Missouri's 7th Congressional District — Barry County (2020)
Party	Candidate	Votes	%	±%
Republican	Billy Long	12,016	78.46%	+2.49
Democratic	Teresa Montseny	2,701	17.64%	−3.34
Libertarian	Kevin Craig	580	3.79%	+0.74
	Write-ins	18	0.12%	

U.S. House of Representatives — Missouri’s 7th Congressional District — Barry County (2018)
Party	Candidate	Votes	%	±%
Republican	Billy Long	9.261	75.97%	+0.43
Democratic	Jamie Daniel Schoolcraft	2,558	20.98%	−0.03
Libertarian	Benjamin T. Brixey	372	3.05%	−0.41

Barry County, along with the rest of the state of Missouri, is represented in the U.S. Senate by Josh Hawley (R-Columbia) and Eric Schmitt (R-Glendale).

U.S. Senate – Class I – Barry County (2018)
Party	Candidate	Votes	%	±%
Republican	Josh Hawley	9,019	73.36%	+19.56
Democratic	Claire McCaskill	2,822	22.95%	−14.65
Independent	Craig O'Dear	234	1.90%	
Libertarian	Japheth Campbell	149	1.21%	−7.39
Green	Jo Crain	71	0.58%	+0.58

Blunt was elected to a second term in 2016 over then-Missouri Secretary of State Jason Kander.

U.S. Senate — Class III — Barry County (2016)
Party	Candidate	Votes	%	±%
Republican	Roy Blunt	10,059	68.69%	+14.89
Democratic	Jason Kander	3,864	26.38%	−11.22
Libertarian	Jonathan Dine	388	2.65%	−5.95
Green	Johnathan McFarland	175	1.19%	+1.19
Constitution	Fred Ryman	159	1.09%	+1.09

==== Political culture ====
United States presidential election results for Barry County, Missouri
Year	Republican		Democratic		Third party(ies)	
Year	No.	%	No.	%	No.	%
1888	1,904	45.07%	1,963	46.46%	358	8.47%
1892	1,940	42.98%	1,904	42.18%	670	14.84%
1896	2,320	42.24%	3,151	57.37%	21	0.38%
1900	2,420	46.49%	2,661	51.12%	124	2.38%
1904	2,568	51.21%	2,237	44.61%	210	4.19%
1908	2,526	49.62%	2,383	46.81%	182	3.57%
1912	1,396	27.71%	2,300	45.65%	1,342	26.64%
1916	2,683	47.82%	2,752	49.05%	176	3.14%
1920	5,162	57.04%	3,729	41.21%	158	1.75%
1924	4,065	47.93%	3,606	42.52%	810	9.55%
1928	5,901	62.89%	3,431	36.57%	51	0.54%
1932	4,497	42.47%	5,957	56.26%	134	1.27%
1936	5,906	50.48%	5,744	49.10%	49	0.42%
1940	6,573	55.68%	5,207	44.11%	24	0.20%
1944	5,796	58.85%	4,029	40.91%	23	0.23%
1948	4,812	50.46%	4,724	49.54%	0	0.00%
1952	6,664	61.77%	4,124	38.23%	0	0.00%
1956	6,063	57.27%	4,523	42.73%	0	0.00%
1960	6,706	63.12%	3,919	36.88%	0	0.00%
1964	4,757	47.27%	5,307	52.73%	0	0.00%
1968	5,537	57.12%	3,398	35.06%	758	7.82%
1972	7,295	69.73%	3,167	30.27%	0	0.00%
1976	5,053	49.79%	5,046	49.72%	49	0.48%
1980	7,038	61.42%	4,193	36.59%	227	1.98%
1984	7,683	68.81%	3,483	31.19%	0	0.00%
1988	7,231	63.00%	4,210	36.68%	36	0.31%
1992	5,565	43.62%	4,791	37.56%	2,401	18.82%
1996	5,855	49.62%	4,352	36.88%	1,592	13.49%
2000	7,885	63.75%	4,135	33.43%	348	2.81%
2004	9,599	68.92%	4,223	30.32%	105	0.75%
2008	9,758	66.63%	4,630	31.62%	256	1.75%
2012	9,832	71.22%	3,667	26.56%	307	2.22%
2016	11,428	78.25%	2,710	18.56%	467	3.20%
2020	12,425	79.66%	2,948	18.90%	225	1.44%
2024	13,138	81.27%	2,873	17.77%	154	0.95%

At the presidential level, Barry County is solidly Republican. Barry County strongly favored Donald Trump in both 2016 and 2020. No Democrat has carried the county's votes in a presidential election since Lyndon Johnson in 1964.

Like most rural areas throughout Missouri, voters in Barry County generally adhere to socially and culturally conservative principles which tend to influence their Republican leanings.

=== Missouri presidential preference primaries ===
==== 2020 ====
The 2020 presidential primaries for both the Democratic and Republican parties were held in Missouri on March 10. On the Democratic side, former Vice President Joe Biden (D-Delaware) both won statewide and carried Barry County by a wide margin. Biden went on to defeat President Donald Trump in the general election.

Missouri Democratic Presidential Primary – Barry County (2020)
Party	Candidate	Votes	%	±%
Democratic	Joe Biden	1,040	65.70	
Democratic	Bernie Sanders	441	27.86	
Democratic	Tulsi Gabbard	15	0.95	
Democratic	Others/Uncommitted	87	5.50	

Incumbent President Donald Trump (R-Florida) faced a primary challenge from former Massachusetts Governor Bill Weld, but won both Barry County and statewide by overwhelming margins.

Missouri Republican Presidential Primary – Barry County (2020)
Party	Candidate	Votes	%	±%
Republican	Donald Trump	2,988	98.39	
Republican	Bill Weld	11	0.36	
Republican	Others/Uncommitted	38	1.25	

==== 2016 ====
The 2016 presidential primaries for both the Republican and Democratic parties were held in Missouri on March 15. Businessman Donald Trump (R-New York) narrowly won the state overall, but Senator Ted Cruz (R-Texas) carried a plurality of the vote in Barry County. Trump went on to win the nomination and the presidency.

Missouri Republican Presidential Primary – Barry County (2016)
Party	Candidate	Votes	%	±%
Republican	Ted Cruz	3,189	45.36	
Republican	Donald Trump	3,030	43.10	
Republican	John Kasich	400	5.69	
Republican	Marco Rubio	255	3.63	
Republican	Others/Uncommitted	157	2.23	

On the Democratic side, former Secretary of State Hillary Clinton (D-New York) both won statewide and carried Barry County by a small margin.

Missouri Democratic Presidential Primary – Barry County (2016)
Party	Candidate	Votes	%	±%
Democratic	Hillary Clinton	874	51.62	
Democratic	Bernie Sanders	796	47.02	
Democratic	Others/Uncommitted	23	1.36	

==== 2012 ====
The 2012 Missouri Republican Presidential Primary's results were nonbinding on the state's national convention delegates. Voters in Barry County supported former U.S. Senator Rick Santorum (R-Pennsylvania), who finished first in the state at large, but eventually lost the nomination to former Governor Mitt Romney (R-Massachusetts). Delegates to the congressional district and state conventions were chosen at a county caucus, which selected a delegation favoring Romney. Incumbent President Barack Obama easily won the Missouri Democratic Primary and renomination. He defeated Romney in the general election.

==== 2008 ====
In 2008, the Missouri Republican Presidential Primary was closely contested, with Senator John McCain (R-Arizona) prevailing and eventually winning the nomination. However, former Arkansas Governor Mike Huckabee carried Barry County, receiving more votes than any other candidate of either party.

Missouri Republican Presidential Primary – Barry County (2008)
Party	Candidate	Votes	%	±%
Republican	Mike Huckabee	2,396	49.69	
Republican	John McCain	1,365	28.31	
Republican	Mitt Romney	739	15.33	
Republican	Ron Paul	266	5.52	
Republican	Others/Uncommitted	56	1.16	

Then-Senator Hillary Clinton (D-New York) easily won Barry County during the 2008 presidential primary. Despite initial reports that Clinton had won Missouri, Barack Obama (D-Illinois), also a Senator at the time, narrowly defeated her statewide and later became that year's Democratic nominee, going on to win the presidency.

Missouri Democratic Presidential Primary – Barry County (2008)
Party	Candidate	Votes	%	±%
Democratic	Hillary Clinton	1,976	65.52	
Democratic	Barack Obama	919	30.47	
Democratic	Others/Uncommitted	121	4.01	

== See also ==
- National Register of Historic Places listings in Barry County, Missouri
