= Missouri Route 90 =

State highway in Missouri, U.S.

Route 90
- MO 90 highlighted in red

Route information
- Maintained by MoDOT
- Length: 46.561 mi (74.933 km)
- Existed: 1922–present

Major junctions
- West end: Route 43 in Southwest City
- I-49 west of Jane; US 71 in Jane
- East end: Route 37 in Washburn

Location
- Country: United States
- State: Missouri
- Counties: McDonald, Barry

Highway system
- Missouri State Highway System; Interstate; US; State; Supplemental
← Route 89	→ Route 91

Route 90 is a 46.561-mile (74.933 km) state highway in McDonald and Barry counties in southwest Missouri, United States, that connects Missouri Route 43 (Route 43) in Southwest City with Missouri Route 37 (Route 37) in Washburn.

== Route description ==
For its entire length Route 90 is a two-lane highway. It passes through rugged areas and the roadway is both very hilly and very curvy.

== McDonald County ==
Route 90 begins an intersection with Route 43 in the extreme northeastern part of the city of Southwest City. (From that intersection northbound Route 43 heads north towards Seneca and southbound Route 43 heads briefly west, then south through Southwest City and then on towards Maysville and Siloam Springs, both in Arkansas. Also from that intersection, County Road 9097 heads south, then southwest to end at Route 43.)

From its western terminus, Route 90 proceeds east for nearly two miles (3.2 km) before turning north-northeast and connecting with the north end of Route MM at a T intersection. (Route MM heads southeasterly towards the unincorporated community of Pack and then on to the Arkansas state line.) Route 90 continues north-northeasterly for just over one mile (1.6 km) before turning easterly again. After about three miles (4.8 km) Route 90 enters the city of Noel and immediately connects with the south end of Route TT at T intersection in a part of the city that was formerly the unincorporated community of Spring Valley.

Approximately one-half of a mile (0.80 km) further southeast Route 90 reaches its western junction with Missouri Route 59 (Route 59) at a T intersection on the south bank of the Elk River. (Route 59 heads north along North Cliffside Drive to cross the Elk River and then on towards Lanagan.) Route 40 proceeds southeast, concurrently with Route 59 for roughly one-third of a mile (0.54 km) before reaching its eastern junction with Route 59 at another T intersection. (Route 59 heads south towards Sulphur Springs and Siloman Springs, both in Arkansas.) After crossing over Butler Creek and then proceeding easterly for a little more than another one-third of a mile (0.54 km), Route 90 connects with the west end of Route H at Kings Highway. (While South Kings Highway heads south to end near the south end of Noel, Route H [North Kings Highway] heads northeasterly towards Interstate 49 / U.S. Route 71 [I-49 / US 71] and Pineville.) Route 90 the proceeds south-southeast and leaves Noel shortly thereafter.

After continuing for south-southeast for a little more than one mile (1.6 km) Route 90 turns to proceed easterly. Approximately 1.6 miles (2.6 km) later Route 90 crosses Mill Creek and about 3.7 miles (6.0 km) after the creek crossing Route 90 reaches I-49 at a diamond interchange, I-49 exit 2. (Note: Opened October 1, 2021 as part of the Bella Vista Bypass) (I-49 heads north to run concurrent with US 71 and then on towards Pineville, Joplin, Kansas City. I-49 heads south towards Bentenville, Fayetteville, and Fort Smith, all in Arkansas.)

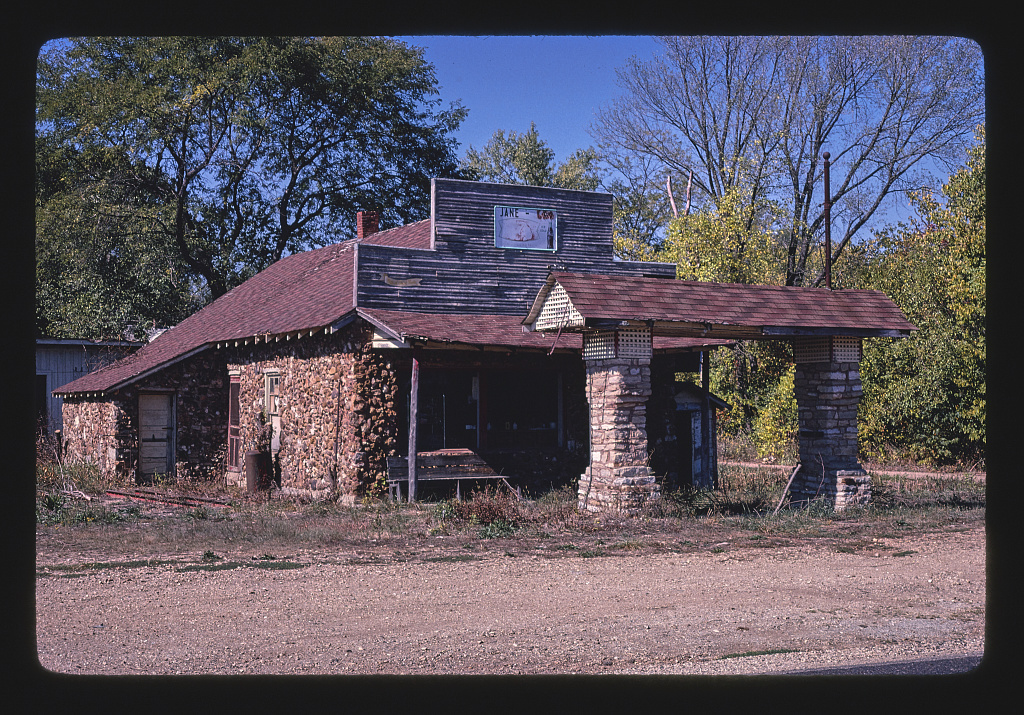
The former Jane Gas & Grocery (now the Jane Store) along Route 90 in Jane, 1980

Roughly five miles (8.0 km) east of I-49, and just after entering the village of Jane, reaches US 71 at an at-grande junction. (I-49 heads north to run concurrent with I-49 and then on towards Pineville, Joplin, and Kansas City. US 71 heads southeasterly towards Bella Vista and Bentonville, both in Arkansas.) Just under a one mile (1.6 km) farther east, Route 90 reaches County Road 7137 (Raines Road) at a T intersection. (Rains Road is the former routing of US 71 and it heads south to connect with US 71, via Meadowlark Lane, farther south in the village.) Route 90 the turns northerly to run along Rain Road for approximately one-tenth of a mile (0.16 km) before turning easterly. (Raines Road, the former routing of US 71, continues northwesterly to end at U.S. Route 71 Business. Shorty Holland Lane heads very briefly west from that intersection as well.) Proceeding northeasterly, Route 90 leave Jane a little more than one-half of a mile (0.80 km) later.

Roughly four-fifths of a mile (1.3 km) east of Jane, Route 90 crosses Little Sugar Creek and the connects with the south end of Route K about 2.6 miles (4.2 km) later. (Route K heads westerly to end at U.S. Route 71 Business. Malcom Lane heads very briefly north from that intersection as well.) Route 90 then proceeds along east-southeasterly course for just over 4 miles (6.4 km), passing through the unincorporated community of Arnett along the way. Route 90 then proceeds east-northeasterly for just over one mile (1.6 km) before reaching its junction with Route E at an unual intersection. (Note: At the junction of Route 90 and Route E the primary highway (Route 90) stops for a secondary road (Route E), a very rare and possibly unique occurrence in the state.) (Route E heads north towards Powell and south towards Pea Ridge.) East of Route E, Route 90 continues east-northeasterly for about 3.3 miles (5.3 km) to connect with the north end of Route KK at a T intersection. (Route KK heads south towards Jacket.) Beyond that intersection Route 90 turns northerly and promptly crosses Big Sugar Creek. After briefly continuing northerly and crossing Trent Creek, Route 90 turns to proceed easterly again for 3.5 miles (5.6 km) to pass through the unincorporated community of Cove, cross Trent Creek for a second time, and leave McDonald County to enter Barry County.

=== Barry County ===
Just over three miles (4.8 km) east of the county line, Route 90 connects with the north end of Route NN at a T intersection. (Route NN heads south toward Mayflower.) From that intersection, Route 90 proceeds northeasterly for 3.2 miles (5.1 km) before connecting with the south end of Route UU at a T intersection. (Route UU heads northwesterly toward the Flag Spring Conservation Area.) From its junction with Route UU, Route 90 proceeds southeast for just of over one-half of a mile (0.80 km) before turning due east and entering the city of Washburn, just under one-half of a mile (0.80 km) later. Near the eastern edge of Washburn, Route reaches its eastern terminus at Route 37 at a T intersection. (Route 37 heads north towards Cassville, Monett, and Sarcoxie. Route 37 heads south towards Seligman, the Arkansas state line, and Gateway in Arkansas.)

== History ==
Route 90 was one of the original 1922 state highways. Its eastern terminus was at Missouri Route 1 in Noel and its western terminus was at the corner of Missouri, Oklahoma, and Arkansas near Southwest City. It was eventually extended down Routes P and K to Washburn.

== Major intersections ==
County	Location	mi	km	Destinations (Note: When possible, the listed destinations are as indicated on the highway's distance road sign(s))	Notes
McDonald	Southwest City	0.000	0.000	Route 43 south – Maysville AR, Siloam Springs AR	Continuation west from western terminus
McDonald	Southwest City	0.000	0.000	Route 43 north – Seneca; CR 9097 south – Route 43	Western terminus
McDonald		2.107	3.391	Route MM south – Pack	T intersection
McDonald	Noel	6.171	9.931	Route TT north	T intersection; within what was the former unincorporated community of Spring Valley
McDonald	Noel	6.672	10.738	Route 59 north (North Cliffside Dr) – Lanagan	T intersection; western end of Route 59 concurrency; on south bank of Elk River
McDonald	Noel	6.996	11.259	Route 59 south – Sulphur Springs AR, Siloam Springs AR	T intersection; eastern end of Route 59 concurrency
McDonald	Noel	6.997	11.261	Bridge over Butler Creek	
McDonald	Noel	7.373	11.866	South Kings Hwy south Route H west (North Kings Hwy) – I-49 / US 71, Pineville	
McDonald		9.379	15.094	Bridge over Mill Creek	
McDonald		14.600– 14.670	23.496– 23.609	I-49 north – Pineville, Joplin, Kansas City I-49 south – Bentonville AR, Fayetteville AR, Fort Smith AR	Diamond interchange; I-49 exit 2
McDonald	Jane	19.492– 19.500	31.369– 31.382	US 71 north – Pineville, Joplin, Kansas City US 71 south – Bella Vista AR, Bentonville AR	
McDonald	Jane	20.412	32.850	CR 7137 south (Rains Rd) – US 71	T intersection; former routing of US 71
McDonald	Jane	20.552	33.075	CR 7137 north (Rains Rd) – US 71 Bus. Shorty Holland Ln west	Former routing of US 71
McDonald		21.894	35.235	Bridge over Little Sugar Creek	
McDonald		24.533	39.482	Route K west – US 71 Bus.	T intersection
McDonald		29.813	47.979	Route E north – Powell Route E south – Pea Ridge	
McDonald		33.174	53.388	Route KK south – Jacket	T intersection
McDonald		33.258	53.524	Bridge over Big Sugar Creek	
McDonald		33.975	54.677	Bridge over Trent Creek	
McDonald		37.123	59.744	Bridge over Trent Creek	
Barry		40.750	65.581	Route NN south – Mayflower	T intersection
Barry		43.965	70.755	Route UU north – Flag Spring Conservation Area	T intersection
Barry	Washburn	46.561	74.933	Route 37 north – Cassville, Monett, Sarcoxie Route 37 south – Seligman, Arkansas state line, Gateway AR	Eastern teriminus; T intersection
1.000 mi = 1.609 km; 1.000 km = 0.621 mi: Concurrency terminus

== See also ==
- List of state highways in Missouri
