= Trent Creek =

Stream in McDonald and Barry counties in Missouri, United States

Trent Creek is a stream in Barry and McDonald counties the Ozarks of southwest Missouri, United States.

== Description ==
The headwaters are in Barry County at 36°35′34″N 94°00′11″W and the river mouth is at Big Sugar Creek in McDonald County at 36°35′02″N 94°08′26″W. The source of Trent Creek is just to the south of Missouri Route UU northwest of Washburn. It flows to the southwest through the Flag Spring Conservation Area. It passes into McDonald County and under Missouri Route 90 then turns west and flows past Cove paralleling Route 90. About two miles west of Cove it again passes under Route 90 an enters Big Sugar Creek.

Trent Creek has the name of the local Trent family.

== See also ==
- List of rivers of Missouri
