= California Branch =

Stream in the American state of Missouri

Coordinates: 38°13′10″N 90°58′23″W

California Branch is a stream in Franklin and Washington counties of the U.S. state of Missouri. It is a tributary of Indian Creek.

The stream headwaters arise in north-central Washington County approximately five miles west-northwest of Richwoods. The stream flows to the northwest for approximately five miles passing through the Little Indian Creek Conservation Area to its confluence 1.5 miles north of the Washington-Franklin county line. The headwaters are at and the confluence is at .

California Branch was named after the state of California, the former home of an early settler.

== See also ==
- List of rivers of Missouri
