= Indian Creek (Meramec River tributary) =

Stream in Missouri, United States

Location
- Country: United States
- State: Missouri
- Region: Franklin and Washington counties

Physical characteristics
- Source
  - location: Washington County, Missouri
  - coordinates: 37°59′28″N 90°58′44″W
- Mouth
  - location: Franklin County, Missouri
  - coordinates: 38°16′29″N 90°56′22″W
  - elevation: 156 m (512 ft)

Indian Creek is a stream in Franklin and Washington counties in the U.S. state of Missouri. It is a tributary of the Meramec River.

The stream headwaters are in Washington County on the north flank of Little Pilot Knob northwest of Potosi and it meanders north passing under Missouri Route 185 and past Pea Ridge. It passes under Missouri Route A and enters Franklin County passing west of the Indian Creek Conservation Area to its confluence with the Meramec southeast of St. Clair near the community of Piney Park.

Indian Creek most likely was so named on account of Osage Indian settlement along its course.

== See also ==
- List of rivers of Missouri
