= OKARMO Corner =

Tripoint boundary of U.S. states

Coordinates: 36°29′58″N 94°37′5″W

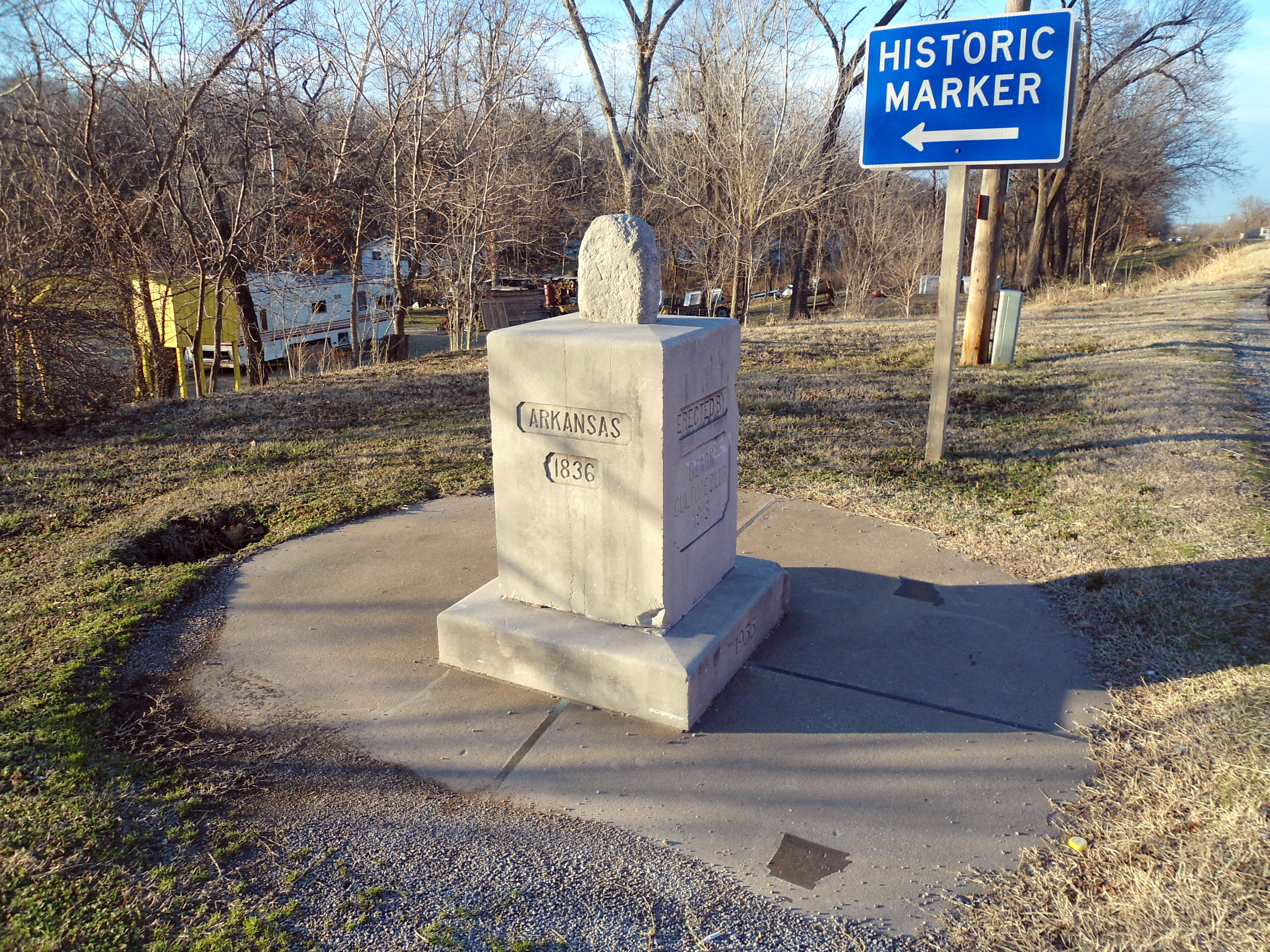
Tripoint near Southwest City, Missouri, facing north into Missouri

OKARMO Corner is a monument marking the tripoint of the U.S. states of Oklahoma, Arkansas, and Missouri. It is located near Southwest City, Missouri, along Missouri Route 43, close to the junction with Arkansas Highway 43 and Oklahoma State Highway 20. The site sits at an elevation of approximately 1,049 feet (320 m) above sea level.

== Description ==
The monument consists of a concrete pedestal installed in 1915 by the Ozark Culture Club, topped with an older stone believed to date from the 1820s. Each side of the pedestal is engraved with the name of a state and its year of admission to the Union: "Missouri 1821," "Arkansas 1836," and "Oklahoma 1907." A fourth side bears the inscription of the Ozark Culture Club. The top stone, marked “Mis. 1821” and “Ark.”, is thought to have originated from an early boundary survey.

== History ==
The tripoint was first surveyed in the early 19th century when Missouri's western boundary was established following the Missouri Compromise of 1820. The original stone marker fell into disrepair and was rediscovered by a local farmer before being incorporated into the current monument. In 1915, the Ozark Culture Club erected the concrete pedestal to preserve the historic stone. The monument was restored in 1955 by the Lions Club of Southwest City, Missouri.

== Accessibility ==
OKARMO Corner is easily accessible by road and is located just off the shoulder of Missouri Route 43. Visitors can stand in all three states simultaneously, making it a popular stop for travelers and geography enthusiasts.

== Significance ==
The site is one of six state tripoints involving Oklahoma and is notable for its layered historical markers, which reflect over a century of efforts to commemorate the intersection of three states.

== See also ==
- Tripoint
- List of Oklahoma tri-points
- OKTXAR Corner
- Texhomex
