= Southwest City, Missouri =

City in McDonald County, Missouri, United States

- City
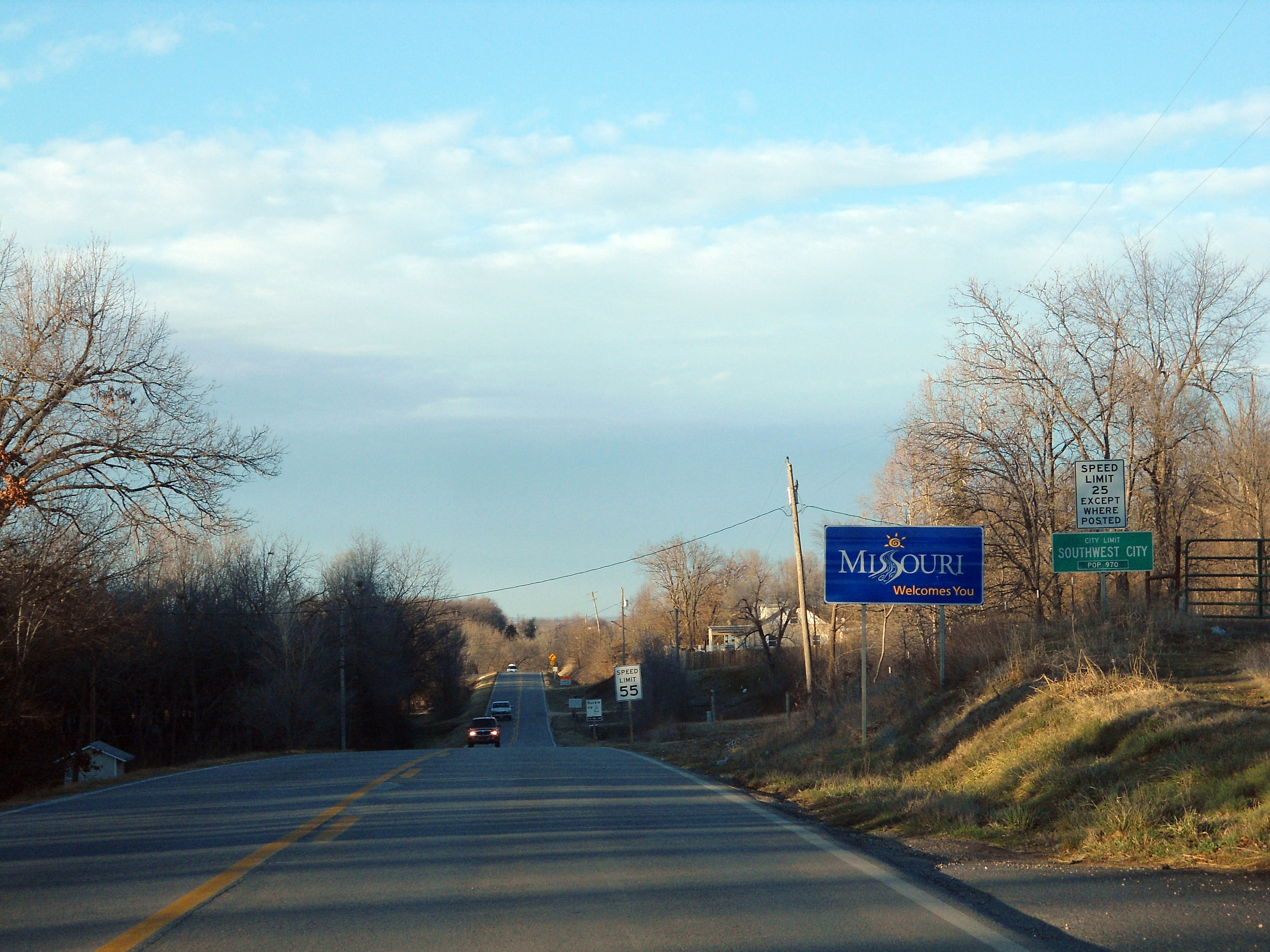
- Southwest City limits near the Arkansas/Oklahoma/Missouri tripoint

- Location in McDonald County and the state of Missouri
- Coordinates: 36°30′59″N 94°36′43″W
- Country: United States
- State: Missouri
- County: McDonald

Area
  - Total: 1.49 sq mi (3.85 km^{2})
  - Land: 1.46 sq mi (3.79 km^{2})
  - Water: 0.023 sq mi (0.06 km^{2})
- Elevation: 1,004 ft (306 m)

Population (2020)
  - Total: 922
  - Density: 630.0/sq mi (243.25/km^{2})
- Time zone: UTC-6 (Central (CST))
  - Summer (DST): UTC-5 (CDT)
- ZIP code: 64863
- Area code: 417
- FIPS code: 29-69230
- GNIS feature ID: 2397669
- Website: southwestcity.org

Southwest City is a city in McDonald County, in the southwestern corner of Missouri, United States. Located near the tripoint where Missouri, Arkansas, and Oklahoma meet, it serves as a small rural community with historical ties to frontier trade and agriculture. As of the 2020 census, the population was 922.

== History ==
The area that would become Southwest City was first settled in the early 1840s by pioneers such as J. P. LaMance and Burton McGhee, who established homesteads along Honey Creek. By 1846, a general store had opened in the valley, and the settlement grew as a crossroads for travelers near the border of Indian Territory (present-day Oklahoma). Its location made it a hub for traders, cattlemen, and land speculators during the mid-19th century frontier period. The community was formally platted in 1870 and named for its position in the extreme southwest corner of McDonald County and the state of Missouri.

Before its incorporation, the region was part of a borderland contested during the era of westward expansion and was influenced by nearby Cherokee Nation lands. The surrounding Ozarks terrain and proximity to the Trail of Tears route meant that Native American presence and cultural exchange were significant in the early years.

By the late 19th century, Southwest City had developed into a thriving town with banks, churches, schools, and businesses serving both local residents and travelers. Its population surged to around 1,500 by 1886, aided by its role as a trade center near the tri-state corner of Missouri, Arkansas, and Oklahoma. The arrival of regional railroads in the early 20th century, including connections to the Southwest Missouri Railroad Company, further integrated the town into the economic life of the Tri-State mining district, which was known for lead and zinc production.

Agriculture and livestock were historically important to the local economy, and by the mid-20th century, poultry processing became a major industry, with companies such as Simmons Foods employing hundreds of residents. Today, Southwest City retains elements of its frontier heritage while functioning as a modern rural community with ties to farming, food processing, and cross-border commerce.

== Geography ==
Southwest City is bordered to the west by the state of Oklahoma, and the Arkansas state line is 1/3 mile (0.5 km) south of the city limits. Missouri Route 43 passes through the city as Main Street, leading north 13 miles (21 km) to Tiff City. To the south the highway becomes Arkansas Highway 43, leading 27 miles (43 km) to Siloam Springs. Missouri Route 90 leads east from Southwest City 8 miles (13 km) to Noel and 21 miles (34 km) to Jane.

According to the U.S. Census Bureau, Southwest City has a total area of 1.49 square miles (3.86 km^{2}), of which 1.46 square miles (3.78 km^{2}) are land and 0.02 square miles (0.05 km^{2}), or 1.55%, are water. Honey Creek runs through the city, flowing northwest to the Neosho River within the Lake o' the Cherokees in Oklahoma.

== Demographics ==
Historical population
Census	Pop.	Note	%±
1880	173		—
1890	707		308.7%
1900	691		−2.3%
1910	483		−30.1%
1920	577		19.5%
1930	484		−16.1%
1940	525		8.5%
1950	595		13.3%
1960	504		−15.3%
1970	453		−10.1%
1980	516		13.9%
1990	600		16.3%
2000	855		42.5%
2010	970		13.5%
2020	922		−4.9%
U.S. Decennial Census

=== 2010 census ===
As of the census of 2010, there were 970 people, 319 households, and 225 families living in the city. The population density was 664.4 inhabitants per square mile (256.5/km^{2}). There were 373 housing units at an average density of 255.5 per square mile (98.6/km^{2}). The racial makeup of the city was 57.5% White, 0.1% African American, 3.7% Native American, 0.1% Asian, 1.6% Pacific Islander, 33.3% from other races, and 3.6% from two or more races. Hispanic or Latino of any race were 50.8% of the population.

There were 319 households, of which 47.3% had children under the age of 18 living with them, 47.0% were married couples living together, 15.0% had a female householder with no husband present, 8.5% had a male householder with no wife present, and 29.5% were non-families. 22.9% of all households were made up of individuals, and 8.7% had someone living alone who was 65 years of age or older. The average household size was 3.04 and the average family size was 3.53.

The median age in the city was 28.6 years. 34% of residents were under the age of 18; 10.1% were between the ages of 18 and 24; 29.4% were from 25 to 44; 18.8% were from 45 to 64; and 7.7% were 65 years of age or older. The gender makeup of the city was 51.8% male and 48.2% female.

=== 2000 census ===
As of the census of 2000, there were 905 people, 311 households, and 213 families living in the town. The population density was 613.6 inhabitants per square mile (236.9/km^{2}). There were 340 housing units at an average density of 244.0 per square mile (94.2/km^{2}). The racial makeup of the town was 71.81% White, 0.12% African American, 7.13% Native American, 0.23% Asian, 15.91% from other races, and 4.80% from two or more races. Hispanic or Latino of any race were 37.31% of the population.

There were 311 households, out of which 41.8% had children under the age of 18 living with them, 51.1% were married couples living together, 11.9% had a female householder with no husband present, and 31.2% were non-families. 26.4% of all households were made up of individuals, and 11.3% had someone living alone who was 65 years of age or older. The average household size was 2.75 and the average family size was 3.31.

In the town the population was spread out, with 33.8% under the age of 18, 10.2% from 18 to 24, 27.8% from 25 to 44, 17.1% from 45 to 64, and 11.1% who were 65 years of age or older. The median age was 29 years. For every 100 females, there were 94.8 males. For every 100 females age 18 and over, there were 86.2 males.

The median income for a household in the town was $22,721, and the median income for a family was $24,808. Males had a median income of $19,688 versus $19,107 for females. The per capita income for the town was $9,526. About 29.8% of families and 40.2% of the population were below the poverty line, including 51.9% of those under age 18 and 33.9% of those age 65 or over.

== Education ==
It is in the McDonald County R-I School District.

== See also ==
- List of cities in Missouri
