= Cove, Missouri =

Unincorporated community in McDonald County, Missouri, United States

Coordinates: 36°34′50″N 94°06′10″W

Cove is an unincorporated community in southeast McDonald County, Missouri, United States. Cove is on Missouri Route 90 and Trent Creek flows past the community to the south.

== History ==
Cove originally served as a country office. A post office called Cove was established in 1894, and remained in operation until 1907.
