= Big Sugar Creek State Park =

State Park in McDonald County, Missouri

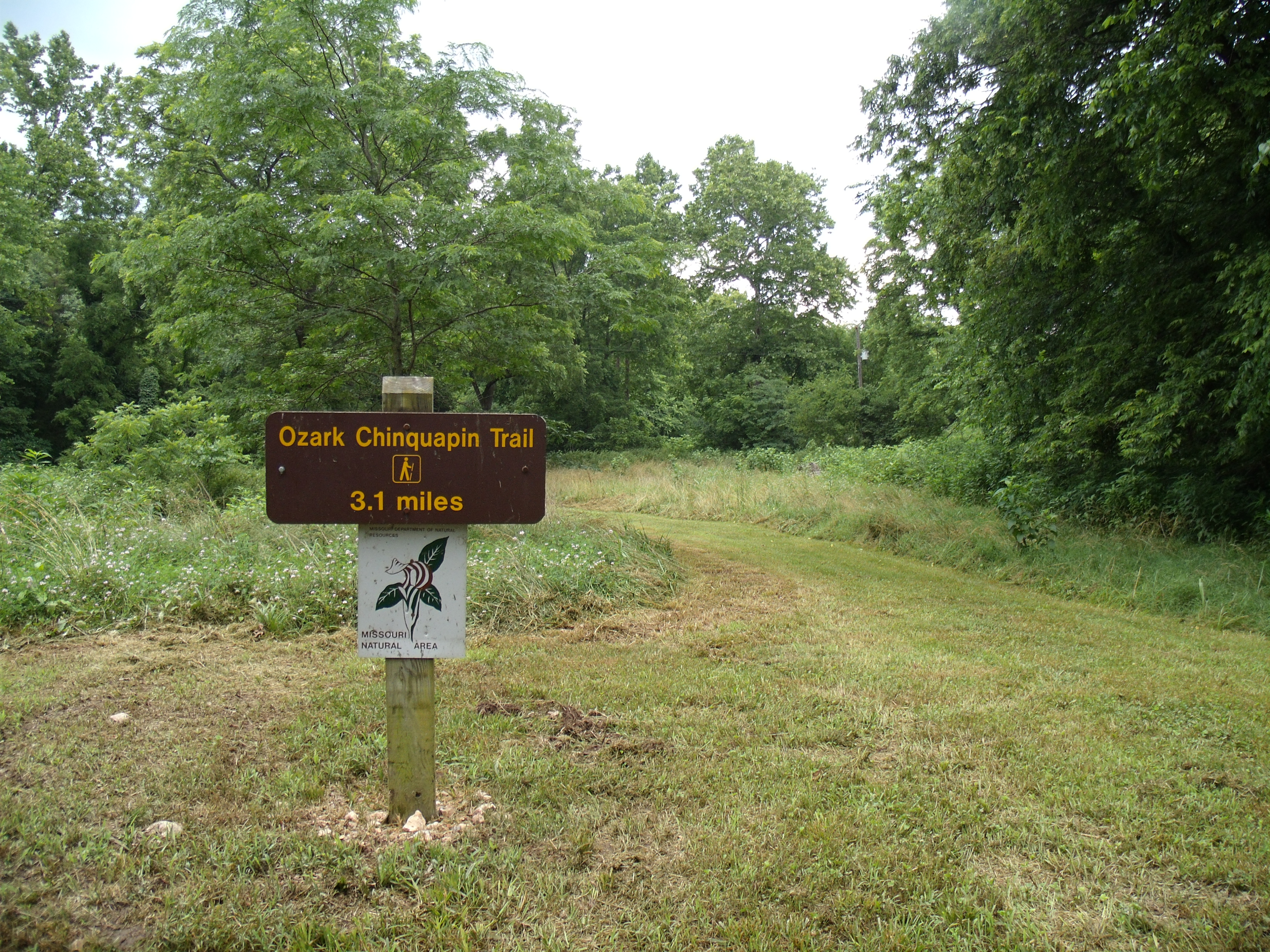

- Location within Missouri Location within the United States
- Interactive map of Big Sugar Creek State Park
- Location: McDonald County, Missouri, United States
- Coordinates: 36°37′17″N 94°17′39″W
- Area: 2,082.54 acres (842.77 ha)
- Established: 1992
- Administrator: Missouri Department of Natural Resources
- Visitors: 26,694 (in 2022)
- Website: Official website

Big Sugar Creek State Park is a public recreation area encompassing more than 2,000 acres (810 ha) in McDonald County in southwest Missouri, United States. The state park was established in 1992 to preserve part of the Elk River water system, which Big Sugar Creek is part of. The park has a three-mile-long (5 km) trail for hiking. A major portion of the park has been designated as the Elk River Breaks Natural Area.
