= Arnett, Missouri =

Unincorporated community in McDonald County, Missouri, United States

Coordinates: 36°33′45″N 94°13′20″W

Arnett is an unincorporated community in southeast McDonald County, Missouri, United States. Arnett is located on Missouri Route 90.

== History ==
A post office was established at Arnett in 1898, and remained in operation until 1916.
