= Goodman, Missouri =

- City
- Location in McDonald County and the state of Missouri
- Coordinates: 36°44′30″N 94°23′37″W
- Country: United States
- State: Missouri
- County: McDonald

Area
  - Total: 1.33 sq mi (3.44 km^{2})
  - Land: 1.33 sq mi (3.44 km^{2})
  - Water: 0 sq mi (0.00 km^{2})
- Elevation: 1,253 ft (382 m)

Population (2020)
  - Total: 1,202
  - Density: 905.9/sq mi (349.77/km^{2})
- Time zone: UTC-6 (Central (CST))
  - Summer (DST): UTC-5 (CDT)
- ZIP code: 64843
- Area code: 417
- FIPS code: 29-27874
- GNIS feature ID: 2396964
- Website: goodmanmo.net

Goodman is a city in McDonald County, Missouri, United States. The population was 1,202 at the 2020 census.

== History ==
A post office called Goodman has been in operation since 1897. The community was named for L. A. Goodman, a businessperson in the local orchards industry.

== Geography ==
Goodman is located in northern McDonald County along Missouri Route 59 just east of U.S. Route 71 and Interstate 49. It is 10 miles (16 km) south of Neosho in Newton County and 6 miles (10 km) north of Anderson.

According to the U.S. Census Bureau, the city of Goodman has a total area of 1.33 square miles (3.44 km^{2}), all land. The city sits on a ridge which drains east to Indian Creek, south to its tributary, Beaver Branch, and west to the Sugar Fork of Buffalo Creek. The entire town is in the watershed of the Elk River, a west-flowing tributary of the Neosho River.

== Demographics ==
Historical population
Census	Pop.	Note	%±
1920	321		—
1930	317		−1.2%
1940	321		1.3%
1950	477		48.6%
1960	540		13.2%
1970	565		4.6%
1980	1,030		82.3%
1990	1,094		6.2%
2000	1,183		8.1%
2010	1,248		5.5%
2020	1,202		−3.7%
U.S. Decennial Census

=== 2010 census ===
As of the census of 2010, there were 1,248 people, 450 households, and 308 families residing in the city. The population density was 938.3 inhabitants per square mile (362.3/km^{2}). There were 504 housing units at an average density of 378.9 per square mile (146.3/km^{2}). The racial makeup of the city was 88.0% White, 0.1% African American, 1.9% Native American, 0.5% Asian, 3.5% Pacific Islander, 2.6% from other races, and 3.4% from two or more races. Hispanic or Latino of any race were 3.9% of the population.

There were 450 households, of which 38.9% had children under the age of 18 living with them, 48.9% were married couples living together, 12.4% had a female householder with no husband present, 7.1% had a male householder with no wife present, and 31.6% were non-families. 25.3% of all households were made up of individuals, and 10.6% had someone living alone who was 65 years of age or older. The average household size was 2.75 and the average family size was 3.28.

The median age in the city was 32.2 years. 29.2% of residents were under the age of 18; 9.6% were between the ages of 18 and 24; 26% were from 25 to 44; 22% were from 45 to 64; and 13.1% were 65 years of age or older. The gender makeup of the city was 49.9% male and 50.1% female.

=== 2000 census ===
As of the census of 2000, there were 1,183 people, 454 households, and 319 families residing in the town. The population density was 921.4 inhabitants per square mile (355.8/km^{2}). There were 501 housing units at an average density of 390.2 per square mile (150.7/km^{2}). The racial makeup of the town was 90.36% White, 0.34% African American, 3.30% Native American, 0.08% Asian, 1.35% Pacific Islander, 0.17% from other races, and 4.40% from two or more races. Hispanic or Latino of any race were 0.76% of the population.

There were 454 households, out of which 35.0% had children under the age of 18 living with them, 52.6% were married couples living together, 10.6% had a female householder with no husband present, and 29.7% were non-families. 26.2% of all households were made up of individuals, and 13.7% had someone living alone who was 65 years of age or older. The average household size was 2.57 and the average family size was 3.06.

In the town the population was spread out, with 28.2% under the age of 18, 7.8% from 18 to 24, 26.7% from 25 to 44, 22.5% from 45 to 64, and 14.8% who were 65 years of age or older. The median age was 36 years. For every 100 females, there were 102.2 males. For every 100 females age 18 and over, there were 93.0 males.

The median income for a household in the town was $26,349, and the median income for a family was $29,728. Males had a median income of $26,250 versus $21,364 for females. The per capita income for the town was $11,052. About 14.8% of families and 18.3% of the population were below the poverty line, including 18.9% of those under age 18 and 16.8% of those age 65 or over.

== Education ==
It is in the Neosho R-V School District.

== Notable people ==
- Jerry Capehart, singer, songwriter, music producer and entertainment manager
