= Sugar Creek Township, Barry County, Missouri =

Township in the US state of Missouri

Sugar Creek Township
- Township
- Coordinates: 36°31′13″N 093°54′55″W
- Country: United States
- State: Missouri
- County: Barry

Area
  - Total: 40.01 sq mi (103.62 km^{2})
  - Land: 40.01 sq mi (103.62 km^{2})
  - Water: 0 sq mi (0 km^{2}) 0%
- Elevation: 1,322 ft (403 m)

Population (2000)
  - Total: 1,969
  - Density: 49/sq mi (19/km^{2})
- FIPS code: 29-71332
- GNIS feature ID: 0766270

Sugar Creek Township is one of twenty-five townships in Barry County, Missouri, United States. As of the 2000 census, its population was 1,969.

Sugar Creek Township was organized in 1835.

== Geography ==
Sugar Creek Township covers an area of 40.01 square miles (103.6 km^{2}) and contains one incorporated settlement, Seligman. It contains three cemeteries: Beaver, Burnett and Seligman.

The stream of Beaver Creek runs through this township.
