= Seligman Sunbeam =

Seligman Sunbeam (1881-1972), Ozark Sunbeam (1973-1976), American Sunbeam (1976-1986)
- Take what is in sight and rustle for more.
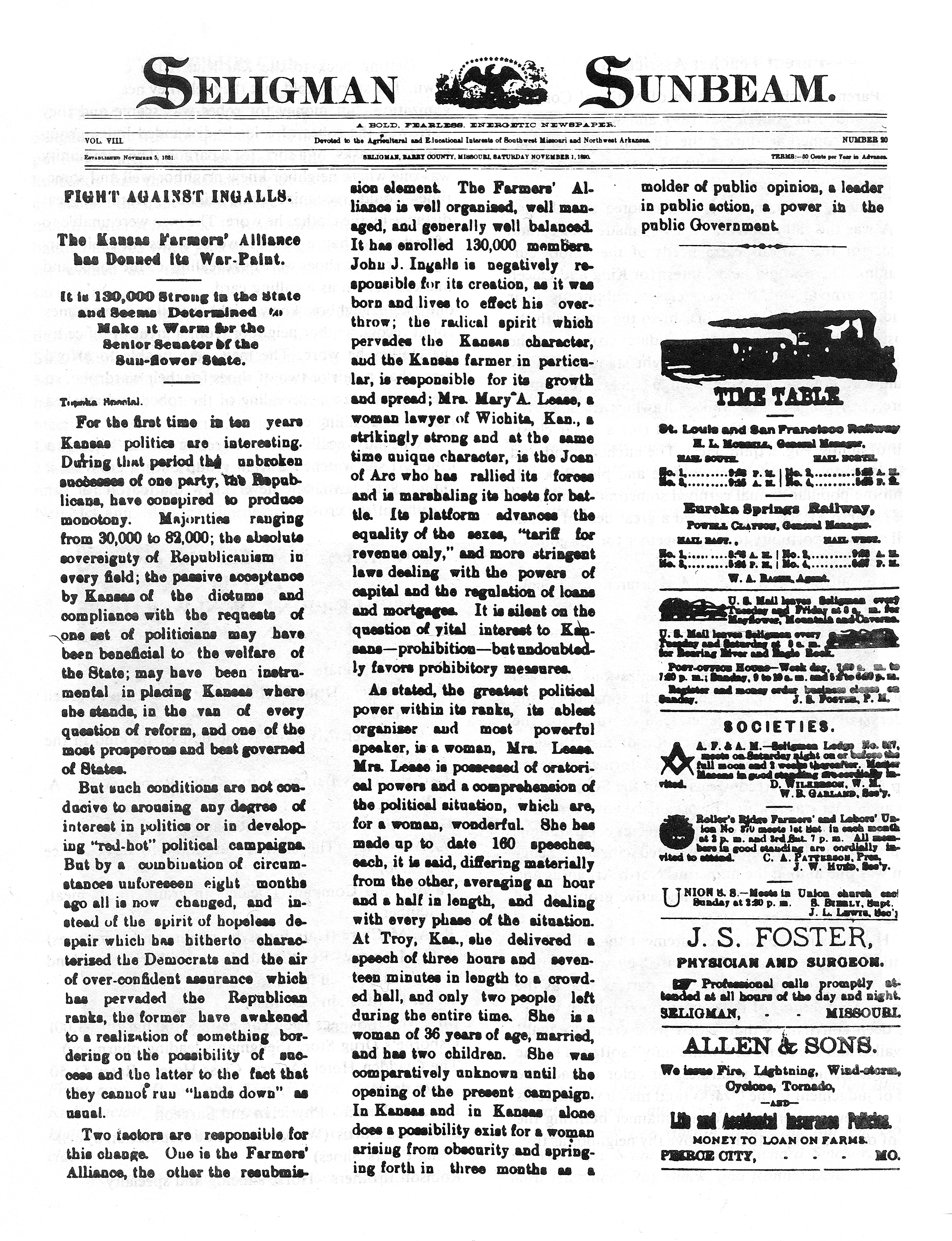
- Seligman Sunbeam issue of November 1, 1890
- Type: Weekly newspaper
- Founder(s): John German Mauger & John E. Kern
- Editor: John German Mauger (1881-1900), Edward Aloysius Roberts (1972-1986)
- Founded: November 1881
- Ceased publication: 1986
- Political alignment: Democratic (At founding)
- Language: English
- Circulation: 600 in 1884

The Seligman Sunbeam was a weekly newspaper based out of the Ozark Mountains town of Seligman, Missouri, located in southern Barry County.

== History ==
It was first published as the Seligman Sunbeam in 1881 and continued under that name until being rebranded as the Ozark Sunbeam starting on January 5, 1973. It was renamed again as the American Sunbeam on October 4, 1976. In October 1981, the publication moved from Seligman to Springdale, Arkansas, where it was published until 1986, when it ceased operations.

At the time it was first established and for the majority of its 105-year history it focused on local news and community events, with the circulation recorded at 600 in 1884. Its first editor was John German Mauger (1856-1898), who along with John E. Kern (1844-1910) owned it and served as co-publishers. It began as a four-page biweekly publication with a subscription price of $1 annually but eventually became a weekly publication. The newspaper's motto was "The Union, The Constitution, and The Enforcement of The Law" and on November 4, 1881, it was the first newspaper in the United States to endorse Grover Cleveland for the presidency. A fire on January 22, 1883, burned much of Seligman's business district, including the offices of the newspaper. After the town was rebuilt, the newspaper office moved into the two-story brick building built by Drury Wilkerson (1836-1928) to house his general store on the southeast corner of North and Main streets. The building, which is still standing, is the most prominent building in Seligman's historic downtown was locally nicknamed "The Brick."

By 1972 the population of Seligman had greatly contracted by about a third from the size it had been when the Seligman Sunbeam was first founded (from around 600 to 424), largely due to the termination of passenger rail service to the town between 1958 and 1960, leaving the newspaper on the verge of extinction. Around this time a self-styled prophet named Edward Aloysius Roberts, known as Bab, purchased the paper. Roberts claimed he was the voice for a deity or entity he called Delamer Duverus. The focus of the newspaper greatly changed at this point. It no longer covered local news, but instead published extreme anti-Semitic conspiratorial material. In this newspaper and his additional writings and publications, including his book The Golden Reed, which he authored under the name Delamer Duverus, he attacked people of the Jewish faith and talked extensively about evil spirits and corrupt government. Publication of the then-named American Sunbeam ended in 1986 with the death of Roberts.
