= Washburn Township, Barry County, Missouri =

Township in the US state of Missouri

Washburn Township
- Township
- Coordinates: 36°35′38″N 093°57′38″W
- Country: United States
- State: Missouri
- County: Barry

Area
  - Total: 28.6 sq mi (74.2 km^{2})
  - Land: 28.64 sq mi (74.17 km^{2})
  - Water: 0.0077 sq mi (0.02 km^{2}) 0.03%
- Elevation: 1,460 ft (445 m)

Population (2000)
  - Total: 1,070
  - Density: 37/sq mi (14.4/km^{2})
- FIPS code: 29-77218
- GNIS feature ID: 0766271

Washburn Township is one of twenty-five townships in Barry County, Missouri, United States. As of the 2000 census, its population was 1,070.

== Geography ==
Washburn Township covers an area of 28.65 square miles (74.2 km^{2}) and contains one incorporated settlement, Washburn. It contains four cemeteries: King, Riley, True Love and Washburn Prairie.
