= Seligman, Missouri =

City in Barry County, Missouri, United States

- City
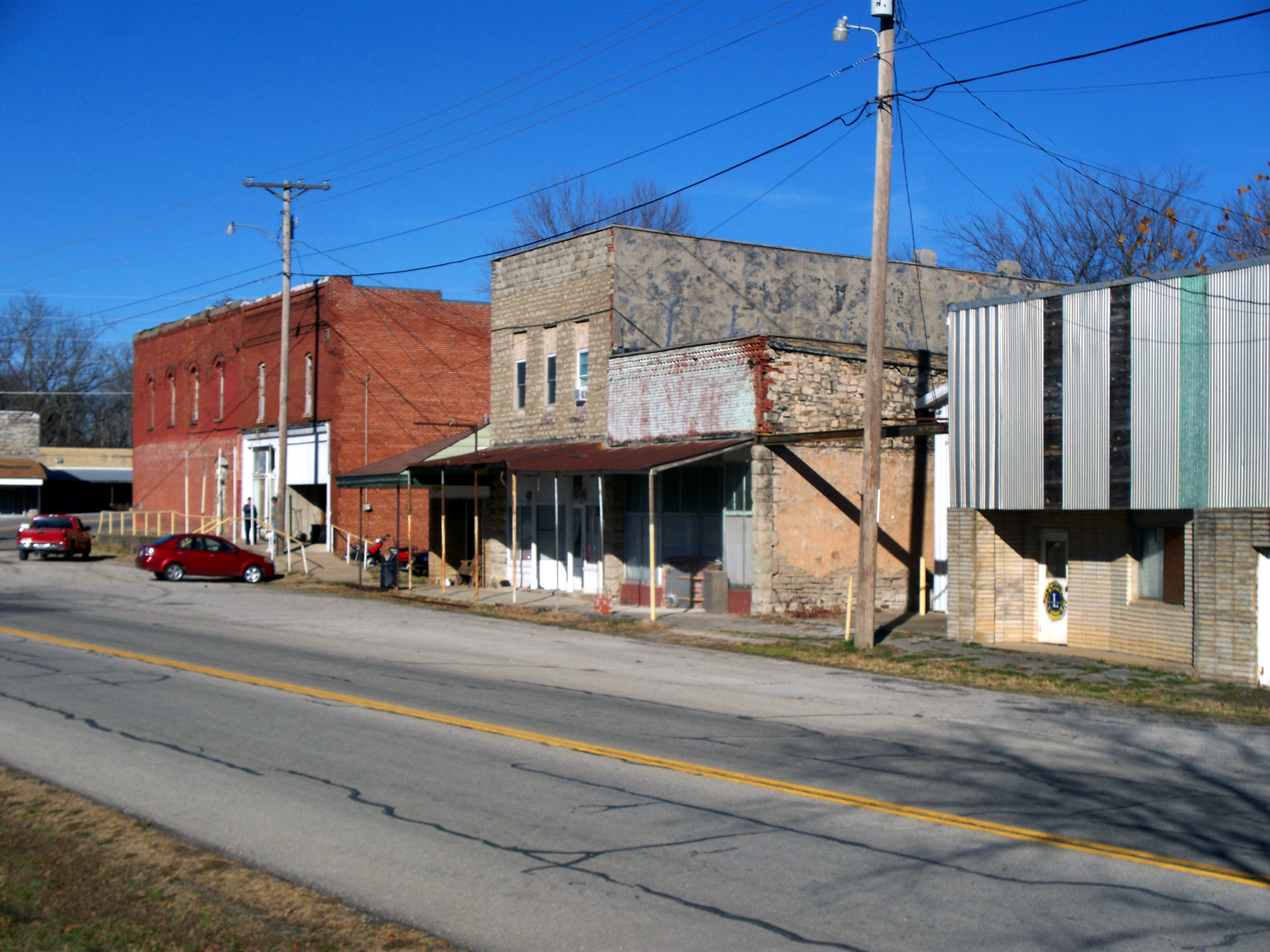
- Downtown Seligman, Missouri. Drew Wilkerson's original general store, also known as "The Brick" sits on the corner on the left.

- Seal

- Location of Seligman, Missouri
- Coordinates: 36°31′23″N 93°56′19″W
- Country: United States
- State: Missouri
- County: Barry
- Township: Sugar Creek
- Settled: 1830s
- Incorporated: March 8, 1881
- Named for: Joseph Seligman

Area
  - Total: 1.25 sq mi (3.23 km^{2})
  - Land: 1.25 sq mi (3.23 km^{2})
  - Water: 0.0039 sq mi (0.01 km^{2})
- Elevation: 1,522 ft (464 m)

Population (2020)
  - Total: 813
  - Density: 652.2/sq mi (251.81/km^{2})
- Time zone: UTC-6 (Central (CST))
  - Summer (DST): UTC-5 (CDT)
- ZIP code: 65745
- Area code: 417
- FIPS code: 29-66530
- GNIS feature ID: 2396572
- Website: seligmanmo.gov

Seligman is a city in Sugar Creek Township, Barry County, Missouri, United States. As of the 2020 census, Seligman had a population of 813. The town is named after Joseph Seligman, a prominent 19th-century businessman. The name Seligman (זעליגמאן, זעליקמאן) is of Yiddish derivation and means "a jolly, cheerful person".

== History ==
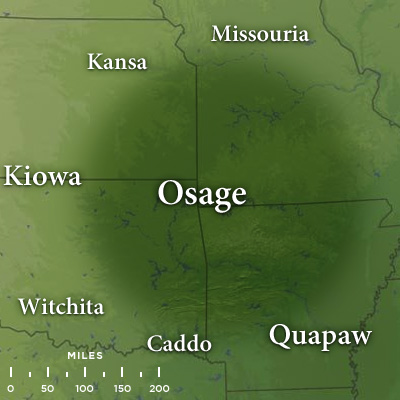
Traditional Osage tribal lands as of the 17th century

=== Before the Louisiana Purchase ===
During French exploration, what was to become Seligman was in the heart of the Osage Nation. The French claimed it as part of the Illinois Country, selling it to the United States as part of the Louisiana Purchase. Osage claims were ceded by the Treaty of Fort Clark, which was ratified in 1810.

=== Early settlers ===
Seligman originally developed from a small trading post that built up around or near the homestead of Andrew, George, John, Joshua, and Jacob Roller from Scott County, Virginia, some of the first permanent European settlers to arrive in the area in the 1830s. At that time the region was a rough-hewn wilderness covered with large timber.

In May 1841, the county court approved construction of the first road through the territory, known today as Old Wire Road. This road originally was a trace cut by hundreds of Cherokee in 1838 as they wound their way across Missouri to Tahlequah, Oklahoma as part of the federal government's Indian Removal Act of 1830 or "Trail of Tears", which passed about five miles west of the Roller homestead. Shortly thereafter, a telegraph line was built which followed this trail, and Old Wire Road was built following the telegraph line.

By 1848 the Butterfield Stage Coach had established a route through the area from St. Louis, Missouri to Fayetteville, Arkansas, and brought even more settlers into the area. By the 1860s, the site had developed into a trading post called Roller's Ridge, though the earliest original name of the community may have been Herdsville, named after Adam Herd or Hurd, who was also an early pioneer.

Education and religion were avidly important to the early settlers. Two schools were built in the area for local children, one north of town about which little is known, and one south of town called "Red Chink", named for the red clay that was used to finish the log construction. These were both subscription schools, a common practice in which each child paid the teacher a dollar a month. School terms were only six months long, but sometimes semesters were extended if enough students enrolled. A Baptist church was also constructed on the outskirts of town, but few records remain.

=== Civil War ===
During the Civil War development mostly ceased as the region was thrown into turmoil and became increasingly lawless. Bushwhackers attacked townspeople in their homes, robbing them of gold, silver, food and supplies. Some bushwhackers were supported by the Union Army and encouraged to commit acts of terror and sabotage to undermine morale. Local government was apparently in disarray—county officials did not hold session from April 1861 to July 1864. During the war, General McCulloch, General Pearce, and General Price met at a private home in Roller's Ridge to discuss the proposed site to wage battle at Cross Hollows in Benton County, Arkansas, before the Battle of Pea Ridge.

=== Reconstruction ===
After the war, development in Roller's Ridge resumed and settlers continued to arrive. In 1866, Christian E. Fawver and his family came to the area from Illinois in a covered wagon and reopened Victory Mills, a gristmill on the upper arm of Big Sugar Creek north of town, and converted it to steam power. This became an important site for local residents. Before the mill opened, locals had to haul their grain to the site of the nearest railroad in Pierce City, Missouri —- a two-day trip. The population continued to grow, and on April 1, 1872, the U.S. Postal Department authorized the establishment of a post office to serve the community, designating it Herdsville. In 1876, another subscription school was built for the town's children, a two-story building with a regular attendance of 40 students. A deep well was dug in the center of Main Street to supply the town's needs, which was named the "Exhaustable Fountain" [sic], but because of the growing population, this well later went dry. Commerce increased, and in 1880 a dray service began operation in town, hauling and delivering freight by wagon with up to three teams of horses or mules. It also operated occasionally as a taxi service.

=== Arrival of the railroad ===
In 1880, the Atlantic and Pacific Railroad built a line from Pierce City to Herdsville. Arriving trains were loaded on a turntable and rotated manually to return to Pierce City. The company also gave 80 acres (32 ha) of land for the purpose of building a town, and also designed its streets, complete with names. At this time, the town consisted of only one whiskey and drug store, and the population consisted mostly of railroad workers, but this store was later joined by a general store operated by Woodridge Anabel, and a hardware store operated by Drew Wilkerson.

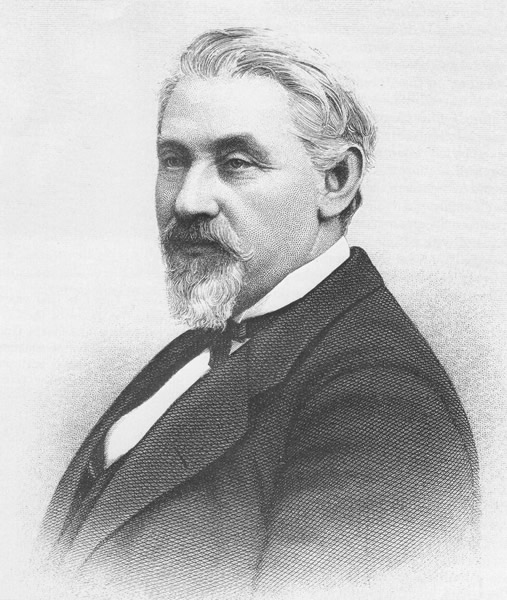
Joseph Seligman (1819 - 1880)

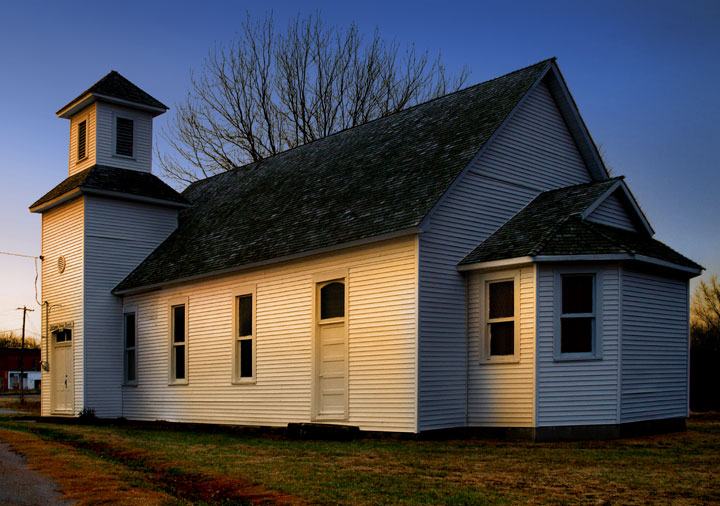
Union Church, Seligman, Missouri

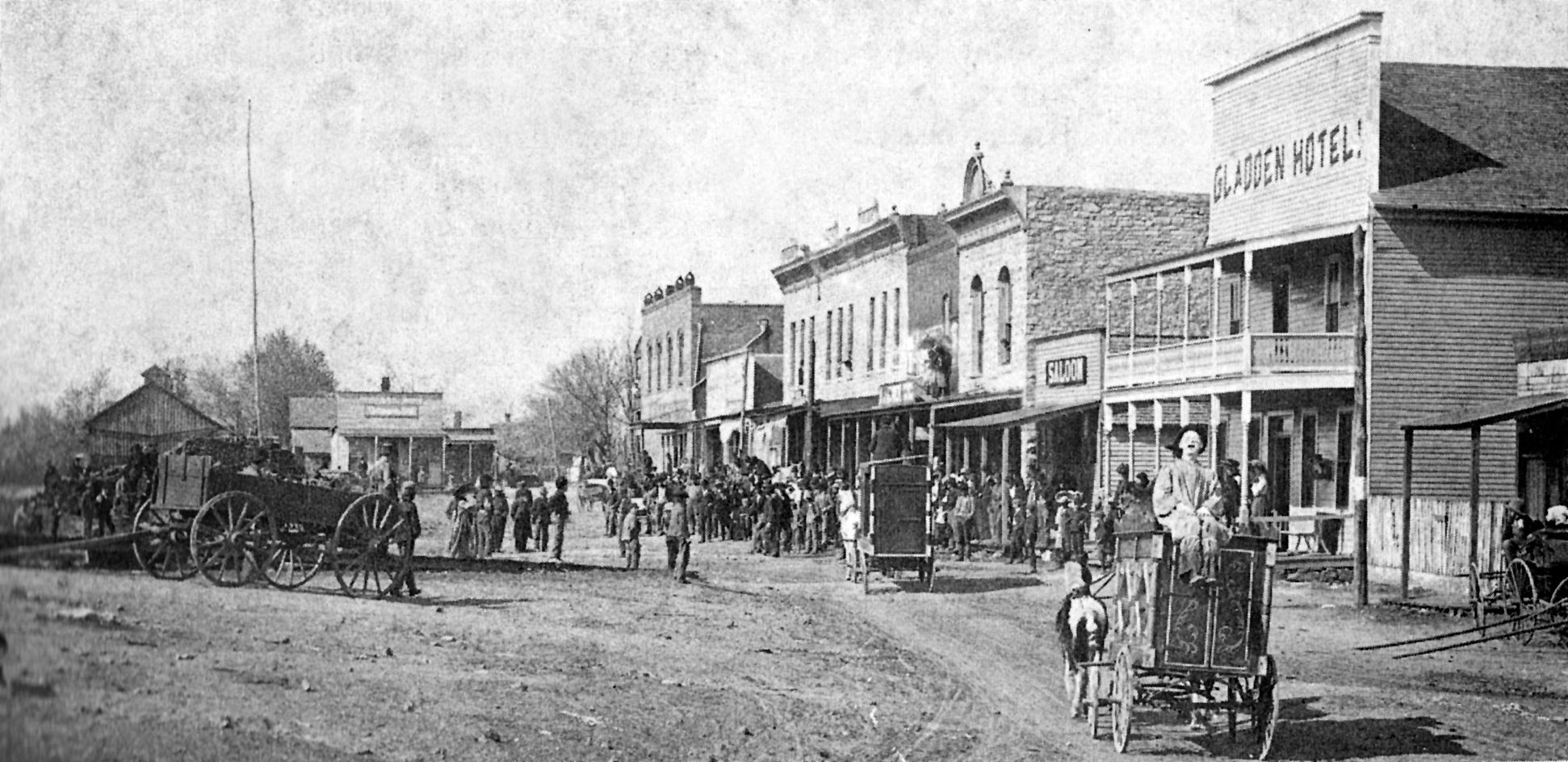
A traveling circus arrives in Seligman, late 19th century

In 1880 the town was platted, and on September 27 renamed Seligman in honor of Joseph Seligman, a wealthy railroad financier who had died the previous April. On March 8, 1881, the town was incorporated. In choosing the name Seligman, the residents recognized that the arrival of the railroad had been a great boon to the small settlement. Apparently as an act of gratitude, Mr. Seligman's widow, Babet Seligman, gave the community $500 and one acre of land towards the building of a church. Together with $300 raised locally, Benjamin McCann constructed the Union Church in 1884. The church still stands and was in continuous use by various Protestant denominations from the time it was built until 1959.

Arriving trains soon brought a greater number and variety of visitors, traders and salesmen, and one of the first hotels, the Inmon House, was opened in 1881. By this time, the town had also grown to include a number of general merchandise stores, as well as a store for agricultural implements, a druggist, two hotels, a meat market, a livery stable, a granary, a lumber yard, a billiard hall, a barber shop, a blacksmith, a photographer, a physician, the Cross & Diver of Eureka Stage Line, and seven saloons. In that year a town newspaper was established, the Seligman Sunbeam, whose motto was "The Union, The Constitution, and The Enforcement of The Law". It was the first newspaper in the United States to endorse Grover Cleveland for the presidency.

In 1882, work began on what became in 1906 the Missouri and North Arkansas Railroad. This track went south and east of Seligman to, first, Eureka Springs and, ultimately, Helena, Arkansas. It poised Seligman toward greater growth and development, though the fare was $1.85 for eighteen miles —- a steep price at the time.

As many as six passenger trains passed through Seligman every day, and two of the hotels operating at the time, the Gladden and the Linden, had difficulty serving the large numbers of people who stopped to stay in town. Many of the travelers were salesmen, or "drummers" who would arrive with large trunks full of sample shoes, hardware, hats or costume jewelry and rent a buggy or dray wagon at the livery stable to transport their goods to outlying towns not connected to the railroad. Eventually six hotels opened in town at one point, which employed many local young people, especially women for cleaning, washing, filling water pitchers in each room, and cooking for boarders.

By this time, local industries included poultry farming as well as timbering and milling for production of railroad ties and whiskey kegs. Principal agricultural products included wheat, oats, corn, cattle and hogs, but residents also harvested peaches, apples, cantaloupe, strawberries, and spring water from Radium Springs. A 30-40 acre vineyard was also cultivated just east of Seligman, and the grapes were shipped to Springdale, Arkansas, to be processed into grape juice and wine.

=== Setbacks ===
A series of major fires had a disastrous impact on Seligman, beginning on January 22, 1883, when a fire broke out at the Exchange Hotel which destroyed it completely along with a large part of the town; W. J. Piper's Witchita [sic] House Hotel, four saloons, a grocery, a meat market, a barber shop, a general store, the Seligman Hotel, a drug store, a bakery, a hardware and a shoe store, as well as the office of the Seligman Sunbeam went up in flames. Exactly two months later, the stables of the Seligman and Eureka Springs Stage Coach Company also burned down. Then, on January 13, 1884, another fire destroyed part of the remaining town.

Residents began rebuilding immediately, and in the process constructed Seligman's first public school, a two-story frame building completed in circa 1892, replacing the subscription school.

=== 20th century ===
In the early 1900s rebuilding continued, with many modern improvements. Southwestern Bell Telephone Company established an office in Seligman, in 1904 postal rural routes were established, in 1905 the Bank of Seligman was opened by C.C. Fawver, and in 1910 George Finn established the Farmers and Merchants Bank. Also in 1910, the North Arkansas line was extended from Seligman through Eureka Springs to Harrison, Arkansas. Two physicians set up practice in town, and one of them opened a four-room hospital. In 1912, the Sure Pop Oil Company attracted investors from Seligman and built an oil rig just across the border in nearby Gateway, Arkansas. In 1914, a tomato cannery was opened and operated by W.F. Turner, a vinegar factory was opened, and there was a brief attempt to mine silver in the town. Before Prohibition, some five saloons operated in Seligman, and it had a reputation as the "wildest town in the west". Nevertheless, around this time Seligman was still just half as large as it had once been.

By the 1920s Seligman had been mostly rebuilt when another fire, the Christmas Fire of December 25, 1922, decimated the heart of the downtown. The Nesbitt Bros. Meat Market was destroyed along with a restaurant, the livery barn, the Gladden Hotel and Annex, the Frost Restaurant, the Northcutt Store, a drug store, a general store, and the Illinois Cafe.

After the Christmas Fire, the town struggled through most of the 20th century to recapture its former prosperity. This was made particularly difficult by the economic pressures of the Great Depression and the steady decline of passenger rail service through the area after World War II, which inevitably led to a contraction in the population of the town. The Missouri and Northern Arkansas Railroad ceased operation in 1958 after heavy rains washed out several bridges and a large section of track between Seligman and Beaver, Arkansas. Frisco's passenger trains ceased their daily runs shortly thereafter. On March 9, 1966 the Frisco Station was demolished, a loss which saddened the community.

Seligman High School enrollment also began to decline after the war, and new state regulations required the formation of the Southwest R-5 School District to include outlying country districts. In 1954, the high school was relocated to Washburn, Missouri. When a heavy snow storm collapsed the roof of the Seligman Elementary School gymnasium on March 10, 1964, all Seligman students were relocated to a new building constructed in Washburn. What remained of the Seligman school was consumed by a fire in the late 1960s.

In the 1990s, Seligman began a series of civic development projects to improve infrastructure, which included the construction of a new city water tower and two city parks.

=== 21st century ===
More recently, Seligman has continued civic development by establishing a community center, playground, public library, and the James L. Bottorff Memorial Museum, constructed as part of the Duane Corn Municipal Complex. A new fiber optic cable also now serves the area. In December 2014, Wal-Mart opened a neighborhood store in Seligman. Wal-Mart closed the store in August 2015 and remained vacant until August 2016 when Harp's acquired the property.

== Geography ==
Seligman is located in the Ozarks and is, bordered by the Mark Twain National Forest to the east. The town is located on a ridge along Missouri Route 37. Rainfall west of the railroad flows into the Grand Lake o' the Cherokees by way of Big Sugar Creek and Cowskin River. Rainfall to the east of Seligman flows to Table Rock Lake by way of Dry Hollow, Blockade Hollow, and Butler Hollow. The region also hosts Karst topography, characterized by high limestone content and the formation of sinkholes and caves.

According to the United States Census Bureau, the city has a total area of 1.25 square miles (3.24 km^{2}), all land.

=== Climate ===
Seligman lies in the humid subtropical climate zone (Köppen Cfa), and experiences all four seasons, generally with hot, humid summers and cold winters, occasionally receiving cold air masses from the north. Seligman lies just east of the area known colloquially as "Tornado Alley."

Climate data for Seligman, Missouri
Month	Jan	Feb	Mar	Apr	May	Jun	Jul	Aug	Sep	Oct	Nov	Dec	Year
Mean daily maximum °C (°F)	7.4 (45.3)	9.7 (49.5)	14.3 (57.8)	20.3 (68.5)	24.1 (75.3)	28.2 (82.8)	31 (88)	31 (88)	27.1 (80.8)	21.6 (70.8)	14.3 (57.8)	9 (48)	19.8 (67.7)
Mean daily minimum °C (°F)	−4.6 (23.8)	−2.7 (27.2)	1.3 (34.4)	7 (45)	12.0 (53.6)	16.6 (61.9)	19.1 (66.3)	18 (65)	14.2 (57.5)	8.4 (47.1)	2.2 (35.9)	−3 (27)	7.4 (45.4)
Average precipitation mm (inches)	58 (2.3)	64 (2.5)	89 (3.5)	110 (4.4)	130 (5.3)	130 (5.2)	89 (3.5)	86 (3.4)	110 (4.4)	97 (3.8)	89 (3.5)	66 (2.6)	1,130 (44.4)
Average precipitation days	5	6	7	9	10	9	6	6	7	7	6	6	84
Source: Weatherbase

== Demographics ==
Historical population
Census	Pop.	Note	%±
1960	387		—
1970	424		9.6%
1980	508		19.8%
1990	593		16.7%
2000	877		47.9%
2010	851		−3.0%
2020	813		−4.5%
U.S. Decennial Census

=== 2010 census ===
As of the census of 2010, there were 851 people, 320 households, and 233 families residing in the city. The population density was 680.8 inhabitants per square mile (262.9/km^{2}). There were 375 housing units at an average density of 300.0 per square mile (115.8/km^{2}). The racial makeup of the city was 94.8% White, 1.9% Native American, 0.5% African American, 0.4% Asian, 0.8% from other races, and 1.6% from two or more races. Hispanic or Latino of any race were 2.7% of the population.

There were 320 households, of which 37.2% had children under the age of 18 living with them, 50.6% were married couples living together, 16.6% had a female householder with no husband present, 5.6% had a male householder with no wife present, and 27.2% were non-families. 22.5% of all households were made up of individuals, and 9.7% had someone living alone who was 65 years of age or older. The average household size was 2.66 and the average family size was 3.11.

The median age in the city was 37.3 years. 27.7% of residents were under the age of 18; 9.9% were between the ages of 18 and 24; 25.8% were from 25 to 44; 26.1% were from 45 to 64; and 10.6% were 65 years of age or older. The gender makeup of the city was 48.8% male and 51.2% female.

=== 2000 census ===
As of the census of 2000, there were 877 people, 317 households, and 222 families residing in the city. The population density was 727.0 inhabitants per square mile (280.7/km^{2}). There were 377 housing units at an average density of 312.5 per square mile (120.7/km^{2}). The racial makeup of the city was 89.85% White, 2.96% Native American, 0.46% Pacific Islander, 3.88% from other races, and 2.85% from two or more races. Hispanic or Latino of any race were 6.61% of the population.

There were 317 households, out of which 34.7% had children under the age of 18 living with them, 50.2% were married couples living together, 12.9% had a female householder with no husband present, and 29.7% were non-families. 22.4% of all households were made up of individuals, and 8.5% had someone living alone who was 65 years of age or older. The average household size was 2.77 and the average family size was 3.23.

In the city the population was spread out, with 31.4% under the age of 18, 9.1% from 18 to 24, 31.5% from 25 to 44, 19.7% from 45 to 64, and 8.3% who were 65 years of age or older. The median age was 31 years. For every 100 females, there were 101.6 males. For every 100 females age 18 and over, there were 100.7 males.

The median income for a household in the city was $25,313, and the median income for a family was $30,417. Males had a median income of $23,563 versus $18,611 for females. The per capita income for the city was $10,918. About 18.9% of families and 26.8% of the population were below the poverty line, including 32.2% of those under age 18 and 27.1% of those age 65 or over.

== Education ==
Seligman is part of the Southwest R-5 School District. Primary and secondary students attend classes in nearby Washburn. The school team is known as The Trojans.

== Notable visitors ==
One story maintains that William Jennings Bryan, famous politician and devout prohibitionist, stopped in Seligman on a layover on his way to give a speech in Eureka Springs and spent some time in a Seligman saloon.

Around 1904, prohibitionist and reformer Carrie Nation visited Seligman on a tour, staying at the Linden Hotel. Although there was some concern about how far she would carry her campaign in a town full of saloons, she did not damage any property, but merely presented a female supporter with a tall-necked bottle with an inscription that read "Oh Drink as Adam and Vote for Prohibition: Carry A Nation, Your Loving Home Defender."

In 1921, noted outlaw Henry Starr came into Seligman, took rooms at the Gladden Hotel, and charmed the proprietor into endorsing a check for $100. The next day, Starr entered the Seligman Bank and approached the teller with the check, which was immediately declined. Mr. Gladden himself stepped forward and informed the teller that the check was good, and even endorsed it. The next day, Starr and his cohorts robbed the bank of $1,200 at gunpoint. They then proceeded to rob a bank at Harrison, Arkansas, where Starr was shot and killed.

== See also ==
- List of cities in Missouri
