= Jacket, Missouri =

Unincorporated community McDonald County, Missouri, United States

Coordinates: 36°30′37″N 94°06′29″W

Jacket (sometimes spelled Jackett) is an unincorporated community in the southeastern corner of McDonald County, Missouri, United States. It is located on Missouri Route KK, approximately one-half mile (0.80 km) north of the Missouri-Arkansas border and one mile (1.6 km) west of the McDonald and Barry county border. The community is on the east bank of Big Sugar Creek.

== Pioneer settlement ==
The hilly and rocky Ozark Mountains land that would become Jacket had served for centuries as a home to native tribes, the last being the Osage, who lived in the area until the United States government took their land in 1808 and 1815. Thus, by the mid-19th century those living in the area were mainly pioneers from eastern states, such as Kentucky and Tennessee, and other parts of Missouri and Arkansas.

The first settlers of European descent arrived in Jacket around 1840-41, among them a John Rose, James Boles and a man known as Clemons. Clemons built a water-powered corn cracker at the spot where Otter Creek, which flows north from Pea Ridge, converges into Big Sugar Creek. Both the names Big Sugar Creek and Jacket are believed to have been coined around this time. According to local legend, Big Sugar Creek is named for the groves of sugar maples that grew on its banks and Jacket is in reference to the colonies of yellow jacket wasps populous in the area, though an alternative theory for the origin of the Jacket name dates slightly later, to the Civil War, from bushwhackers from the south who called themselves Yellow Jackets.

Clemons sold his corn cracker to Henry Schell (1810-1863) in 1846, a purchase which is said to have been possible by Schell selling a young slave boy for $400. Schell had previously established the community of Shell Knob in Barry County. In moving to Jacket, he brought his wife, Elizabeth Yocum Schell, and their young children to make a claim on the large tracts of land that were open in the area for homesteading. He then built a grist mill at the site of the corn cracker and had a house built west of the mill out of lumber that had been sawed at the Van Winkle mill in War Eagle, Arkansas. By the time of his murder by bushwhackers in 1863, he had amassed landholdings of more than 1,000 acres.

== Civil War ==
In the summer of 1863, the Civil War was in full swing, and southwest Missouri and northwest Arkansas was an area torn by loyalties between the North and the South. Henry Schell’s four oldest sons were all off fighting for the Confederate States of America. On July 11, 1863 he was working in his mill when he either heard or saw a group of bushwhackers heading his way. He took off toward his house by foot, but was shot as he went up the hill. His wife, daughters and some neighbor women took his body and prepared it for burial, using a meal box from the mill to serve as a coffin, and buried him in the front yard of his home. One of his sons, a blacksmith by trade, later put a wrought iron fence around the grave. Following his death, his 1,000 acres was divided among his descendants, who built homes, started businesses and set aside land for churches, a cemetery and a school. Over time, his descendants continued to subdivide their acreage and sold off plots to other families.

== Early 20th-century commerce ==
Though Henry Schell's grist mill was destroyed by a flood a few years after his death, it was eventually replaced, by his son, also Henry Schell (1841-1928), one-quarter mile north on Big Sugar Creek. And in this new location, a central core developed for the community.

Atop the hill directly north of his mill, the younger Henry Schell established the Jacket store prior to 1908, at some point taking on Jasper Armstrong (1888-1967) as a partner in the venture. Like many similar businesses, the Jacket general store served as the center of the community and acted as more than just a place to buy merchandise, but a place to meet and talk and, in later years, incorporated a gas pump. Schell was appointed the postmaster for Jacket on January 27, 1908, though mail service delivery in the community did not start until October 2, 1911. Additionally in October 1911, Schell sold out his share in the store to Jasper Armstrong's stepbrother Joseph J.Vaughn (1878-1955), who also moved his blacksmith shop to the location. Together Vaughn and Armstrong operated the store, until Jasper Armstrong moved to Powell, Missouri to operate a store there, then Vaughn partnered with a different stepbrother Thomas J. Armstrong (1893-1957) in the business, and later with Thomas and Jasper's nephew Alvin Armstrong (1893-1951). Later, Joseph Vaughn's younger brother Edgar Vaughn (1885-1976) took over the store along with Alvin Armstrong. Following Henry Schell, the office of postmaster for the Jacket post office that operated in the store changed to Jasper Armstrong in 1912, followed by Thomas Armstrong in 1918 and finally Alvin Armstrong in 1920, who served in the role until the Jacket post office was discontinued on April 30, 1930, with mail service shifting to Garfield, Arkansas.

Ownership of the business shifted several times in the following years, with Ben Evans running it until October 1933, when a Jack Branam bought it. Then, in 1936, Tom Armstrong, who had been living in California, returned to Jacket and took back over the business. In February 1938, another merchant took his place, Joe DeMoss, though Edgar Vaughn had required it by 1941, when he sold the business for the last time. The store remained shuttered until February 1943, when Ben Evans returned and reopened it, though his return proved shore lived, with it closing again August 1 of that year. It would not stay closed though, reopening at least one more time, with Cline and Eva Carden operating it until a final closure around 1950.

In addition to the mill, store and blacksmith shop, a small tomato canning factory also operated in Jacket, a venture also owned by members of the Schell family, who ran similar operations in Powell, Missouri and Pea Ridge.

== Community life ==
An Extension Homemakers club was active among the women in the community through the 1930s and into the 1940s, while two 4-H clubs were established in 1937, one aimed toward boys with a focus on farming and another toward girls on sewing clothing.

For most of the 20th century, both Antioch Church of Christ and Sugar Creek Baptist Church catered to the souls of the community. The Church of Christ, with a distinctive flagstone exterior, continues to hold services. The original one-room Baptist church was built in 1897 by a group of local men as a meeting house for two congregations, one of Primitive Baptist and another of Missionary Baptist. It was designed with two doors on the front, in accordance with Primitive Baptist followings at the time that the men would enter through one door and the women and children through the other. The Missionary Baptists would use the building on the first and third Sunday of the month and the Primitives on either one or both of the additional Sundays. Over time, the two congregations merged into one and joined the Southern Baptist Convention. Starting in 1965 several additions and updates were made to the church, including the addition of an education wing at the back of the original building, to which a second story was added in the mid 1970s. The interior was modernized with paneling and fluorescent lighting, the two doors on the front of the church were replaced with a set of double doors, a porch was added and a steeple with a bell was put on the roof. Despite the updating and a surge in growth only a few years prior, by the mid 1980s membership was in decline, so in 1986 the congregation voted to close the church. In the early years of the last century, the grounds of the old Baptist church served as the location for annual 4th of July celebrations and other community events.

The Jacket school, also known as the Pleasant View school, taught generations of Jacket area children from the first through the eighth grade. In its history, there were at least three different buildings that housed the school. The earliest known building was replaced by a new school in 1923, and that building was destroyed by a fire the day before school was set to start in 1937, after which the final Jacket school building was constructed. In the late 1950s, all the rural schools in this area were consolidated into a new building on the Southwest R-V school district campus in Washburn. The 1937 building remained standing until destroyed in a fire on Thursday, October 22, 1963. The fire also burned four acres of surrounding brush, until extinguished by a Missouri Conservation Commission fire crew, who estimated the value of the destroyed building at $300.

In 1929, the county authorized the building of a bridge across Big Sugar Creek in Jacket, replacing the ford, which was unusable in high water. The single-lane bridge was built on concrete supports with steel girders and wood decking and railing, crossing the creek an eighth of a mile north of where the Civil War-era Schell mill stood. The bridge remained in use until replaced by a two-lane concrete bridge in early 1993. The south end of the current bridge sits at the approximate location of the earlier Schell mill.

== Decline ==
Jacket’s commerce activity faded following the construction of the bridge and the increase in automobile ownership, which provided local residents with the option of leaving the community on a more regular business to do their shopping, go to work, or attend church. By 1960, the store, blacksmith shop, grist mill, post office, tomato plant and school were all shuttered. Today, only remnants of the community remain, the old general store building remains standing, though now converted into a barn, and the former Baptist church is also still extant, but in use as a private residence, while the tomato canning plant, blacksmith shop, gristmill and school are all no longer.
