= Piney Park, Missouri =

Community in Franklin County in the U.S. state of Missouri

Coordinates: 38°18′04″N 90°56′34″W

Piney Park or Piney Bluff Park is a community in Franklin County in the U.S. state of Missouri. The community is on Missouri Route K approximately four miles southeast of Saint Clair.

The site was established as a resort area on a bluff above the Meramec River.
