= Pack, Missouri =

Unincorporated community in McDonald County, Missouri, United States

Coordinates: 36°30′24″N 94°31′59″W

Pack is an unincorporated community in McDonald County, Missouri, United States, just north of the Arkansas-Missouri state line.

== History ==
A post office called Pack was established in 1904, and remained in operation until 1906.
