= Mill Creek (Elk River tributary) =

Stream in McDonald County, Missouri and Benton County, Arkansas in the United States

Mill Creek is a stream in Benton County, Arkansas and McDonald County, Missouri in the United States, that is a tributary of the Elk River.

== Description ==
The headwaters are in Arkansas about four miles (6.4 km) east of Sulphur Springs at 36°28′24″N 94°23′11″W and the confluence with the Elk River is in Missouri on the northeastern edge of Noel at 36°32′55″N 94°28′59″W at an elevation of 820 feet (250 m).

Mill Creek was named for a saw mill at its banks.

== See also ==
- List of rivers of Arkansas
- List of rivers of Missouri
