= Mayflower, Missouri =

Unincorporated community in Barry County, Missouri, United States

Coordinates: 36°30′38″N 94°03′06″W

Mayflower is an unincorporated community in Barry County, Missouri, United States, that was named after the Mayflower.

== History ==
A post office called Mayflower was established in 1887, and remained in operation until 1910. The community took its name from the Mayflower, the 17th-century ship.
