= Big Sugar Creek =

River in Missouri and Arkansas, United States

Location
- Country: United States
- State: Missouri, Arkansas
- Cities: Powell, Missouri, Pineville, Missouri

Physical characteristics
- Source: Natural springs
  - location: near Seligman, Missouri, Barry County, Missouri, Missouri
  - coordinates: 36°31′11″N 93°57′32″W
- Mouth: Elk River
  - location: Pineville, Missouri, McDonald County, Missouri, Missouri
  - coordinates: 36°35′18″N 94°22′57″W
- Length: 47 mi (76 km)
- Discharge
  - location: Powell, Missouri
  - average: 137 cu/ft. per sec.

Big Sugar Creek is a 47-mile-long (76 km) waterway in the Ozark Mountains of southwest Missouri. The creek starts near the Arkansas state line. Big Sugar starts from three tributaries. One flows north from Garfield, Arkansas, and one, west near Seligman, Missouri, and another, south from Washburn, Missouri. Big Sugar flows west down Sugar Creek Valley, where in the Jacket community it is joined by Otter Creek, from Pea Ridge, Arkansas.

Starting near Powell in McDonald County, Missouri and continuing for approximately 25 miles (40 km) and then ending at the creeks confluence with Little Sugar Creek, is a stretch popular for canoeing and kayaking. Approximately 24 miles (39 km) of this is floatable during the spring and summer. In addition to being a scenic place to paddle a canoe, kayak or raft, Big Sugar is also noted for its fishing opportunities. Around the creek is a natural area that is known and used for camping and other outdoors recreation activities.

Southwest of Powell, Big Sugar Creek is crossed by the Powell Bridge, a National Register of Historic Places site that was built in 1915 before being closed to vehicular traffic in 2014 and currently serves as a pedestrian bridge. A recent improvement to the area is the Big Sugar Creek State Park, in which about 80 percent of its more than 2,000 acres (8.1 km^{2}) have been designated as the Elk River Breaks Natural Area, and is protected as an undeveloped area. This area of the state has a distinct natural history, featuring many plants and animals that are less common or absent in other areas of Missouri.

== Location and course ==
Big Sugar starts from three tributaries. One flows north from Garfield, Arkansas, and one, west near Seligman, Missouri, and another, south from Washburn, Missouri. Big Sugar flows west down Sugar Creek Valley, where in the Jacket community it is joined by Otter Creek, from Pea Ridge, Arkansas. Flowing north for two or three miles (5 km), Big Sugar is joined by White Oak. Next is the community of Mountain. From Mountain, Big Sugar flows west for two miles (3 km) where Pine Creek joins.

Flowing west, Big Sugar goes through the town of Powell, Missouri. Bentonville Hollow and Creek join Big Sugar at Highway E Bridge. One mile past Powell, Mikes Creek enters from the east. Further down the creek stands Bee Bluff, known for its high cliffs which tower against the side of the mountain. Bee Bluff Hole is known for its deep water and large fish. At the end of Highway V, is Little Cedar Hollow on the right, followed by the Horseshoe Bend just above the town of Cyclone. Next is the town of Cyclone. Big Sugar then splits, the old channel flows to the right and heads into the town of Pineville. The left channel meets Little Sugar Creek, forming Elk River (Oklahoma). In addition to being a scenic place to paddle a canoe, kayak or raft, Big Sugar is also noted for its fishing opportunities. Around the creek is a natural area that is known and used for camping and other outdoors recreation activities.

== History of the area ==
The name of Big Sugar Creek is believed to come from the fact that at one time, there were a number of sugar maple trees near its course. The first settlers to this area were supplied with syrup, sugar and a wide variety of trees, fruits and nuts. Some of these were water oak, post oak, pin oak, white oak, giant sycamore, pine, cedar, elm, blackhaw, chinquapin, walnut, hickory and several types of maple. Some of the fruits that were used are huckleberry, blackberry, raspberry, strawberry, dewberry, wild plum, cherry, apple, paw-paw, May apple and persimmon.

Local legend states that Daniel Boone lived along the banks of Big Sugar Creek and led some of the early settlers through the Ozark trails. When ready to die, Boone made himself a walnut coffin, but his neighbor's wife died suddenly and Boone gave the coffin to his neighbor.

From the initial settlement of the area in the 1820s-1840s up until the early 20th century, Big Sugar Creek was home to a large number of mills. A saw mill and grist mill owned by Henry and Elizabeth Schell was situated at the point where Otter Creek joined Big Sugar Creek in the community of Jacket. The Schells had previously founded the town of Shell Knob, Missouri in Barry County, Missouri before establishing their claim on 1,000 acres (4.0 km^{2}) in McDonald County. Henry Schell was killed by bushwhackers during the American Civil War and his wife and daughters, as his sons were off fighting for the Confederate States of America, dug his grave and buried him in the yard of the old homestead. The war disrupted the usual funeral rituals. They used a large wooden meal box from the mill as a coffin. His mill was later destroyed in a flood.

One of the largest mills along Big Sugar stood at the junction of Brush Creek. Heavy rains washed this mill away in the late 19th century. A smaller mill was built near the old dam. Several mills dotted Bentonville Hollow and Creek into Arkansas. Just outside the town of Powell, about two hundred feet, was a mill built back in the early 1840s. In July 1883, the Ozarks were part of a major flood that destroyed most of the mills along the rivers and streams. Part of the mill dam can still be seen today. Mikes Creek enters into Big Sugar at Powell and they say several mills were along this creek.

== Use by recreational watercraft ==
Approximately 24 miles (39 km) of the creek is floatable during the spring and summer. The gradient is near 9 feet per mile from Highway 90 to Cyclone and 6 feet per mile to Pineville, Missouri. Big Sugar starts from three tributaries. One flows north from Garfield, Arkansas, and one, west near Seligman, Missouri, and another, south from Washburn, Missouri. Starting near Powell in McDonald County, Missouri and continuing for approximately 25 miles (40 km) and then ending at the creeks confluence with Little Sugar Creek, is a stretch popular for canoeing and kayaking.

== Protected areas ==
A recent improvement to the area is the Big Sugar Creek State Park, in which about 80 percent of its more than 2,000 acres (8.1 km^{2}) have been designated as the Elk River Breaks Natural Area, and is protected as a perpetual, undeveloped area that features a wide diversity of wildlife, birds, plants and forests. This area of the state has a distinct natural history, featuring many plants and animals that are less common or absent in other areas of Missouri. The park also offers a three-mile (5 km) hiking trail.

== Communities along Big Sugar ==
Several distinct communities shoulder Big Sugar and comprise the residents of the Sugar Creek Valley as it twists and turns through the Ozark hills. Most of these communities are little more than a name today, but at one time they included mills, general stores, small canning operations, schools, post offices and gas stations. In some, most traces of previous commercial establishment are all but obliterated, but others still retain recognizable evidence of a time before automobiles, when certain necessities had to be within a few miles.

Jacket — At one time this community included a mill, a general store, a gas station, a post office, a tomato canning plant, a blacksmith, a couple churches and a school. Today, all that remains in operation is a single church, Antioch Church of Christ, which is located on Highway KK and still holds regular services. Antioch Chapel and Cemetery are close by, on the opposite side of the highway. The old general store building, which also housed the post office and gas station, still remains standing and is used as a barn and the old Sugar Creek Baptist Church building, which was built in 1897 and remained as a Baptist church until early 1985 when the congregation disbanded and the building was purchased and used as an Assembly of God church for about a decade, is now a private residence.

Mountain — This community, which was named for the hilly terrain of the area, included Henry Schell Jr.'s mill, post office (called Schell's Mill), general store, and blacksmith shop, and later a gas station, churches and a school. Today, the general store and gas station building still stands, as does the school, and church, Mountain Bible Church, which continues to hold regular services.

Roller — This community sits near the juncture of Big Sugar Creek and Pine Creek, as well as the juncture of Big Sugar Creek and Trents Creek. It is named after the Roller family, who were among the early settlers of the area. Today, Roller still retains its quiet country charm, primarily thanks to the three historic structures that stand in a row across Highway 90 from the old Roller Cemetery. The three buildings date from the late 19th century until the first half of the 20th century. The oldest of the three structures is the one room Laughlin Chapel, named after James O. Laughlin and his brothers, who were the primary builders of it and are all buried in the neighboring cemetery. This building dates to the 1880s and while the Methodist congregation which initially used it disbanded in the 1950s, it was restored by the Roller Cemetery Association in the 1990s with donations from local residents, including descendants of its original builders. The one-room Roller Schoolhouse, also known as the Trents Creek Schoolhouse, was built in the early half of the 20th century and saw multiple generations of students pass its doors. This structure was also restored through contributions around the year 2000. The third building is Pleasant Hill Baptist Church, which has sat there for around a century. This church still holds regular services and has been added onto and renovated multiple times.

Powell — This community sits near the juncture of Big Sugar Creek and Mikes Creek. Powell is one of the better preserved communities along Big Sugar. One of its general store buildings still stands and is occasionally in operation as is the Albert E. Brumley and Sons/Hartford Music Company, which has operated out of Powell since the 1940s. Owned and operated by the late gospel composer Albert E. Brumley, the hymn and songbook publishing operation is now run by his son Robert Brumley. Albert E. Brumley's best known song, "I'll Fly Away (hymn)" has been recorded by multiple Grammy Award winning musicians and even inspired the name of a television series. Brumley also started an annual, though now defunct, craft fair and concert in a field next to his house in Powell. Through the years such celebrities as Minnie Pearl and Grandpa Jones, of Hee Haw fame, performed at the venue. Several other older structures also exist, but are no longer in use, such as the First Baptist Church building and an old gas station.

Cyclone — This community's name comes from a "cyclone" that swept through, destroying everything in its path. As the story goes, the Cyclone area was an Indian trading post for many years. An Indian baby was found here at the John Milleson farm. It was wrapped in deerskin and mummified. Indian burial grounds have been found in this area. The baby is now in the Smithsonian Institution. The first grist mill was built here about 1860 by Albert Cook. James Cowan built a store here and it was also used as a post office until 1873. The Cyclone Mill was purchased around 1883, by Henry Schell Jr. The original low water bridge and mill were used by movie makers for the Twentieth Century Fox movie of Jesse James (1939 film) in 1938, which starred Henry Fonda and Tyrone Power. In the 1920s, W.W. Chase opened a boys' camp on the edge of Cyclone and named it Camp Tilden. Today this is a popular campground, RV park and canoe outfitter.

== Seasons ==
The Big Sugar is used for recreation during all seasons. Camping, hiking, backpacking, horseback riding, fishing, swimming and canoeing are some of the activities available along Big Sugar Creek. Spring and summer offer the best floating conditions. Fall and winter offer sights that can't be seen during the summer. Caves and bluffs line the banks all the way into Arkansas.

== See also ==
- List of rivers of Arkansas
- List of rivers of Missouri
- Sugar Creek, Missouri
