= Butler Creek (Elk River tributary) =

Stream in McDonald County, Missouri and Benton County, Arkansas in the United States

Butler Creek is a stream in northwestern Benton County, Arkansas and southwestern McDonald County, Missouri in the United States, that is a tributary of the Elk River.

== Description ==
The stream headwaters are in Arkansas east-southeast of Sulphur Springs at an elevation of about 1,250 feet (380 m) (36°27′44″N 94°22′59″W). The stream flows west northwest past Sulphur Springs and turns to the north as it enters Missouri. Its confluence with the Elk is on the west side of Noel at an elevation of 820 feet (250 m) (36°32′44″N 94°29′22″W).

Butler Creek has the name of Charles Butler, a pioneer citizen.

== See also ==
- List of rivers of Arkansas
- List of rivers of Missouri
