= Washburn, Missouri =

City in Barry County, Missouri, United States

- City
- Location of Washburn, Missouri
- Coordinates: 36°35′20″N 93°57′56″W
- Country: United States
- State: Missouri
- County: Barry
- Township: Washburn

Area
  - Total: 0.90 sq mi (2.33 km^{2})
  - Land: 0.90 sq mi (2.33 km^{2})
  - Water: 0 sq mi (0.00 km^{2})
- Elevation: 1,476 ft (450 m)

Population (2020)
  - Total: 407
  - Density: 452.1/sq mi (174.55/km^{2})
- Time zone: UTC-6 (Central (CST))
  - Summer (DST): UTC-5 (CDT)
- ZIP code: 65772
- Area code: 417
- FIPS code: 29-77200
- GNIS feature ID: 2397204

Washburn is a city in Washburn Township, Barry County, Missouri, United States. The current town encompasses the sites of two communities formerly known as Keetsville and O'Day and is named for local pioneer Samuel C. Washburn. As of the 2020 census, Washburn had a population of 407.

== History ==
=== Keetsville 1850?–1868 ===
Located along the historic Trail of Tears and on the Old Wire Road, and was a Butterfield Overland Mail Route Flag Stop. Keetsville traced its official settlement to Georgia native John Cureton (1795-1853), who had served as a judge in Washington County, Arkansas before settling on the Washburn Prairie about two miles north of current day Washburn in 1840 and then procured the location of the town. In 1853, Cureton died and ownership of the land transferred to the Englishman James T. Keet (1818-1863), who then laid out the town of Keetsville. The 1850s saw the first real establishment of the town with Keet establishing a store at the site. The growth of the town would be interrupted by the Civil War, as a February 1862 skirmish, a predecessor to the much larger Battle of Pea Ridge the next month in Pea Ridge, Arkansas, would result in the destruction of the fledgling town. Following the war, the town was rebuilt between 1867 and 1869 and in 1868 it was renamed Washburn in honor of an early pioneer to the area Samuel Washburn, who had lived in the area about ten years, before moving to Texas where he was killed in 1838.

=== O’Day 1880–1892 ===
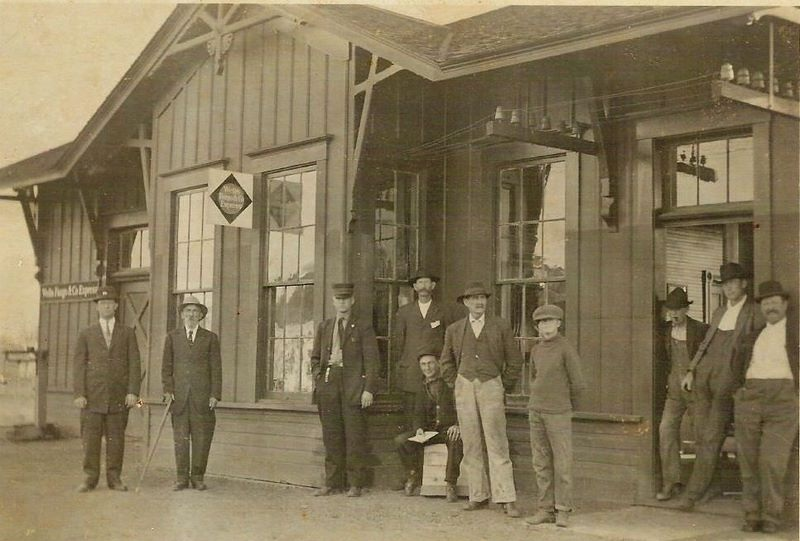
The Washburn train station was built by the Atlantic and Pacific Railway to transport passengers and freight in and out of the town. This photo taken circa 1910 shows the station at its peak. After passenger rail service was discontinued in Washburn in the 1950s, the station fell into disrepair and was razed in the 1960s.

In the winter of 1879 and 1880, the Atlantic and Pacific Railway — at that time a franchise of the St. Louis and San Francisco Railway — built a railroad line between Pierce City and Seligman, Missouri. This line ran about a half mile west of what was then Keetsville, but soon to be renamed Washburn. Instead of incorporating the Keetsville or Washburn name into the railroad stop at this location, the stop and the community that blossomed next to it was instead named O’Day, after the Irish-born John O’Day (1843-1901), a Springfield-based attorney for the railroad. In the years that followed O’Day grew, adding two hotels, shops, a newspaper, dwellings and in either 1887 or 1888 a post office, while also remaining codependent of neighboring Washburn concerning educational, religious and social life.

=== Washburn 1868–Present ===
The community of Washburn, formerly Keetsville, was officially incorporated as a town on August 4, 1880, though it is unclear if O’Day ever incorporated as a separate town. The two communities continued as separate entities through the 1880s and into the 1890s, when in 1892 the O’Day post office was disestablished and the Washburn post office took over for a newly consolidated community, a consolidation that was likely prompted by the building of a public school between the two communities.

=== Commerce history ===
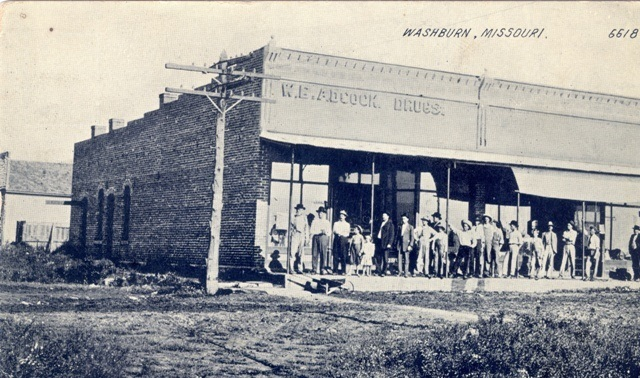
W.B. Adcock's drug store building, which also at one time housed the town's post office and is currently used as the town's community center.

Following the establishment of the railroad and the growth of the former O’Day community, many businesses were established in what is now Washburn. Among these were the O’Day House Hotel, Felker & Johnson's mercantile, the Pratt or Cunningham grocery store, J. M. Holton's mercantile, Denbo's grocery, the Brookshire & Chandler drug store, and W. B. Adcock's drug store. Many of these businesses had previously been located in the old Keetsville site, but moved to take advantage of the railroad. The O’Day Globe newspaper was founded in 1887. That same year, Irishman Timothy Patrick Mooney (1833-1912) moved his store and warehouse there from Washburn. In 1887 Reece Brothers built a large store and Postmaster James Buchanan Hurst (1859-1934) a post-office building.

In the original Keetsville location, Postmaster John O. Burton (1798-1852), John Cureton and Garrett Moore (1804-1870) had all established businesses before the war. J. W. Elliott was a silversmith in the 1870s and Blennerhassett & Co. was a hardware store. By 1872, Washburn had 200 to 300 inhabitants, six general stores, three drug stores, a stove and tin store, three hotels, a boot shop, a jewelry store, and a school. In 1880, the same year as the establishment of O’Day, the population was 575. Among the businesses at that time were a nursery, multiple general stores and drug stores. Hotels operated by Mrs. A. Foster and T. P. Mooney. Flour and saw mills and multiple saloons were also in operation at this time. J. C. Thomas was the constable, William Keene Bayless (1850-1930) was the justice of the peace, William Rhoda Felker (1855-1929) was a real estate agent and J. W. Eggleston (1821-?), James Henry McDonald (1831-1917) and James T. Means (1824-1884) were physicians.

In addition to the O’Day Globe, several other newspapers were published in the Washburn area through the years, including Winger’s Journal in 1869, Professor White's Gazette was published briefly and in 1911 The Washburn Review was printed for a short time.

=== Washburn today ===
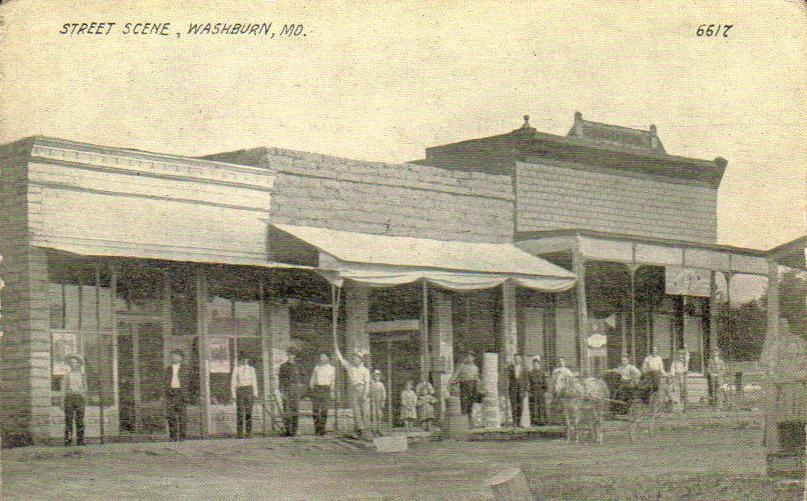
Several former buildings in Washburn's commercial district as they appeared circa 1910. In the second half of the 20th century, most of the town's commercial structures fell into disrepair and were razed.

Through much of the early 20th century Washburn prospered, but the increase in automobile ownership and the elimination of passenger rail service to the town in the 1950s eventually led to a major decrease in businesses and residents. The commercial district along Main Street, which was the heart of the former O’Day community, decayed through the second half of the 20th century, resulting in the destruction of much of the town's historic core, including the razing of the original Atlantic and Pacific Railway train station in the 1960s.

Today the local school district is the town's main employer. There is a bank, a farming supply business, a couple convenient/ gas stations and some smaller businesses that continue to operate in the town. These businesses are largely concentrated in the area of the original Keetsville plat and away from the area that had anchored the town for most of the last century. A handful of historic buildings do remain in downtown Washburn, including the lodge building and the W.B. Adcock's drug store building, which at one time was used as the town's community center and currently and now houses the town's post office.

== Geography ==
Washburn is located in southwest Barry County along Missouri Route 90 just west of Missouri Route 37. Seligman lies approximately 3.5 miles to the south and Cassville is about eight miles to the northeast along Route 37.

According to the United States Census Bureau, the city has a total area of 0.90 square miles (2.33 km^{2}), all land.

== Demographics ==
Historical population
Census	Pop.	Note	%±
1880	217		—
1970	257		—
1980	289		12.5%
1990	362		25.3%
2000	448		23.8%
2010	435		−2.9%
2020	407		−6.4%
U.S. Decennial Census

=== 2010 census ===
As of the census of 2010, there were 435 people, 178 households, and 110 families residing in the city. The population density was 483.3 inhabitants per square mile (186.6/km^{2}). There were 203 housing units at an average density of 225.6 per square mile (87.1/km^{2}). The racial makeup of the city was 94.0% White, 0.9% Native American, 0.2% Pacific Islander, 0.2% from other races, and 4.6% from two or more races. Hispanic or Latino of any race were 4.6% of the population.

There were 178 households, of which 34.8% had children under the age of 18 living with them, 43.8% were married couples living together, 11.2% had a female householder with no husband present, 6.7% had a male householder with no wife present, and 38.2% were non-families. 28.7% of all households were made up of individuals, and 11.2% had someone living alone who was 65 years of age or older. The average household size was 2.44 and the average family size was 3.05.

The median age in the city was 33.1 years. 24.8% of residents were under the age of 18; 14.2% were between the ages of 18 and 24; 24.1% were from 25 to 44; 25.8% were from 45 to 64; and 11% were 65 years of age or older. The gender makeup of the city was 47.6% male and 52.4% female.

=== 2000 census ===
As of the census of 2000, there were 448 people, 175 households, and 121 families residing in the city. The population density was 534.2 inhabitants per square mile (206.3/km^{2}). There were 186 housing units at an average density of 221.8 per square mile (85.6/km^{2}). The racial makeup of the city was 96.43% White, 2.23% Native American, 0.22% from other races, and 1.12% from two or more races. Hispanic or Latino of any race were 2.01% of the population.

There were 175 households, out of which 38.3% had children under the age of 18 living with them, 49.1% were married couples living together, 16.0% had a female householder with no husband present, and 30.3% were non-families. 26.9% of all households were made up of individuals, and 14.3% had someone living alone who was 65 years of age or older. The average household size was 2.56 and the average family size was 3.01.

In the city the population was spread out, with 29.0% under the age of 18, 10.3% from 18 to 24, 29.7% from 25 to 44, 17.4% from 45 to 64, and 13.6% who were 65 years of age or older. The median age was 33 years. For every 100 females, there were 88.2 males. For every 100 females age 18 and over, there were 78.7 males.

The median income for a household in the city was $27,417, and the median income for a family was $29,792. Males had a median income of $22,917 versus $20,167 for females. The per capita income for the city was $12,401. About 10.4% of families and 13.7% of the population were below the poverty line, including 18.9% of those under age 18 and 20.0% of those age 65 or over.

== Public school system ==
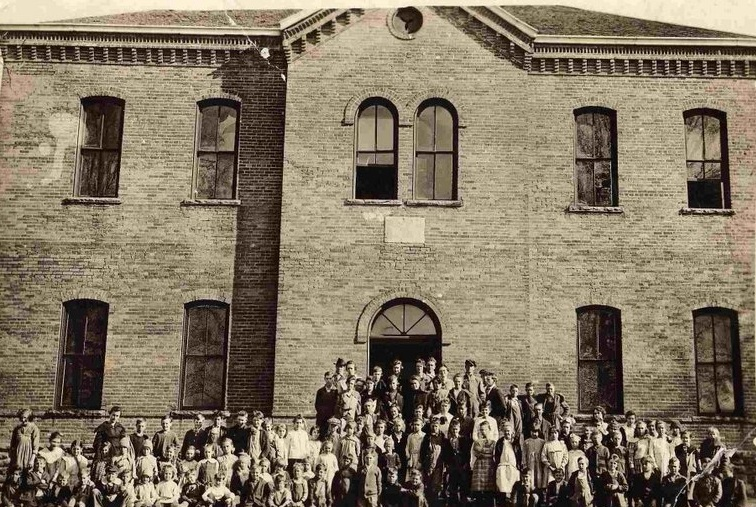
The Washburn school house as it appeared in 1919. The school was built as a result of an 1888 bond issue. The current campus of the Southwest R-V School District occupies the location of this building, which was destroyed by a tornado in the early 1920s.

Like most early communities in the Ozark Mountains, public education in Washburn likely started in private homes and churches. By 1888, the idea of a permanent public school district was largely settled and a vote on a bond issue that year resulted in the construction of a new brick school building on land between the town of Washburn and the community of O’Day. The site of that school building continues in use today as the campus of that school's modern predecessor, the Southwest R-V School District. The building that the 1888 bond provided for would provide instruction for Washburn area students up until the eighth grade, though by 1920 it had expanded to offering high school classes.

In the early years of the school district there was no bus service, so children too far from the school to make it on foot on a daily basis attended various rural schools in the area, including Trents Creek, Maple Grove, Seven Star, Rock Springs, OK, Jacket and others. A tornado in the early 1920s destroyed the earlier building, so in 1924 a brick, single-story building was built to replace it. In the 1930s the Washburn School District instituted bus service, bringing high school students from the outlying communities into town for instruction beyond the eighth grade. This necessitated the addition of a second story to the 1924 structure as well as a gymnasium attached to the back of it. By 1954 the decision was made to close the Seligman School District in neighboring Seligman and bus those students to the larger Washburn campus. This consolidation resulted in the current Southwest R-V School District. Around this time the decision was also made to close the rural schools, most of them being antiquated in resources and limited in size, and use the bus service to bring the younger students to the former high school building in Seligman, while the Washburn building was then used exclusively as a high school. The Washburn building served as the high school and the Seligman building as the elementary for the next 10 years. Then on March 10, 1964, a heavy snowstorm cause the collapse of the Seligman elementary's gymnasium roof. The residents of the school district then voted to build a new elementary school building in Washburn, alongside the 1924 high school building. The 12 classroom elementary building cost $260,000 and was dedicated on August 22, 1965. The new building included classrooms, a multipurpose room, a theater and a cafeteria. The decision to build the new elementary school in Washburn also spurred a short lived revolt against the school district by residents in Seligman, who were upset at losing the school. The residents formed their own unofficial Seligman common school district and sought a legal order to dissolve the Southwest R-V School District and divide the assets. This action was later dismissed.

On the morning of March 23, 1975, the 1924 high school building caught fire and burned to the ground. The school board quickly set up an election for April 17, 1975 to replace the building on a bond in excess of $200,000. The bond passed with more than the two-thirds majority needed and a new high school building was built and in service the following school year. By 1980 a separate middle school building had also been added to campus and in 1983 a new gymnasium was constructed; in 1982 the gymnasium that had been attached to the 1924 high school building was destroyed by fire. By the end of the 1990s increased enrollment, especially from the rural areas of the district, necessitated the need of a larger and more modern high school. With the construction and opening of this new high school building in the early 2000s, the 1975 high school building became the district's new middle school building and elementary school students occupied both the 1981 middle school building and the 1965 elementary school building, which is currently the oldest building on a campus that dates its original educational origins to the 1888 bond issue.

== See also ==
- List of cities in Missouri
