= Pea Ridge, Missouri =

Extinct hamlet in Missouri, U.S.

Coordinates: 38°07′33″N 91°02′31″W

Pea Ridge is an extinct town in Washington County, in the U.S. state of Missouri. The GNIS classifies it as a populated place.

A post office called Pea Ridge was established in 1911, and remained in operation until 1932. The community was named after a nearby ridge of the same name, which in turn was derisively named from the notion the soil there was inadequate to support any crop other than peas.
