= Hickory Creek =

Hickory Creek may refer to several places in the United States:

== Canada ==
- Hickory Creek, a watershed administered by the Long Point Region Conservation Authority, that drains into Lake Erie

== Arkansas ==
- Hickory Creek (Buffalo Creek tributary), at tributary of the Buffalo Creek in Polk County
- Hickory Creek (Illinois River tributary), at tributary of the Illinois River in Washington County
- Hickory Creek (White River, Benton County, Arkansas), a tributary of the White River in Benton County
- Hickory Creek (White River, Madison County, Arkansas), a tributary of the White River in Madison County
- Hickory Creek (Little Missouri River tributary), a tributary of the Little Missouri River in Hempstead and Pike Counties

== Florida ==
- Hickory Creek (Peace River tributary), a tributary of the Peace River in Hardee County

== Louisiana ==
- Hickory Creek (Dobson Bayou tributary), a tributary of the Dobson Bayou in St. Tammany Parish

== Michigan ==
- Hickory Creek (St. Joseph River tributary)

== Missouri ==
- Hickory Creek, Audrain County, Missouri, an extinct town in Audrain County
- Hickory Creek, Grundy County, Missouri, an unincorporated community
- Hickory Creek (Black River tributary), a stream in Missouri
- Hickory Creek (Establishment Creek tributary), a stream in Missouri
- Hickory Creek (Grand River tributary), a stream in Missouri
- Hickory Creek (Little Wyaconda River tributary), a stream in Missouri
- Hickory Creek (Nodaway River tributary), a stream in Missouri
- Hickory Creek (Shoal Creek tributary), a stream in Missouri
- Hickory Creek (Thompson River tributary), a stream in Missouri

== North Carolina ==
- Hickory Creek (Deep River tributary), a stream in Guilford County, North Carolina

== Ohio ==
- Hickory Creek (Hickory Run tributary), a tributary of the Hickory Run in Mahoning County

== Pennsylvania ==
- Hickory Creek (Delaware River tributary), a tributary of the Delaware River in Plumstead Township, Bucks County
- Hickory Creek (Hickory Run tributary), a tributary of Hickory Run in Mahoning County, Ohio, and Lawrence County
- Hickory Creek Wilderness

== Texas ==
- Hickory Creek, Texas, a town in Denton County

== See also ==
- Hickory Branch, Cooper County, Missouri, a stream
- Hickory Creek station, Mokena, Illinois
