= List of rivers of Arkansas =

This article is a list of rivers in the U.S. state of Arkansas.

== By drainage basin ==
This list is arranged by drainage basin, with respective tributaries indented under each larger stream's name.

=== Red River ===
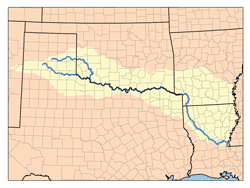
Red River Drainage Basin

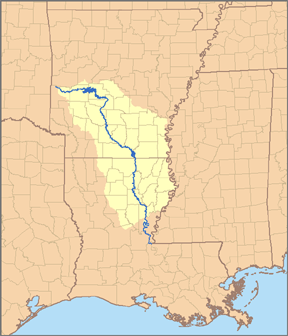
Ouachita Drainage Basin

- Mississippi River
  - Red River
    - Black River (LA)
      - Tensas River (LA)
        - Bayou Macon
      - Ouachita River
        - Boeuf River
        - Bayou D'Arbonne (LA)
          - Cornie Bayou
        - Bayou Bartholomew
        - Saline River
          - Hurricane Creek
        - Moro Creek
        - Smackover Creek
        - Little Missouri River
          - Terre Noire Creek
          - Terre Rouge Creek
          - Antoine River
          - Hickory Creek
        - Caddo River
    - Loggy Bayou (LA)
      - Flat River (LA)
        - Red Chute Bayou (LA)
          - Bodcau Bayou and Creek
      - Bayou Dorcheat
    - Sulphur River
    - McKinney Bayou
    - Little River
      - Saline River
      - Cossatot River
        - Little Cossatot River
      - Rolling Fork
      - Mountain Fork

=== Arkansas River ===
- Mississippi River
  - Arkansas River
    - Bayou Meto
    - Fourche Creek
    - Little Maumelle River
    - Maumelle River
    - Fourche La Fave River
      - South Fourche La Fave River
    - Cadron Creek
    - Point Remove Creek
    - Petit Jean River
    - Illinois Bayou
    - Big Piney Creek
    - Mulberry River
    - Poteau River
      - James Fork
    - Lee Creek
    - Illinois River
      - Flint Creek
        - Sager Creek
      - Hickory Creek
    - Neosho River (OK)
      - Elk River (OK)
        - Big Sugar Creek
        - Little Sugar Creek
          - Tanyard Creek

=== White River ===
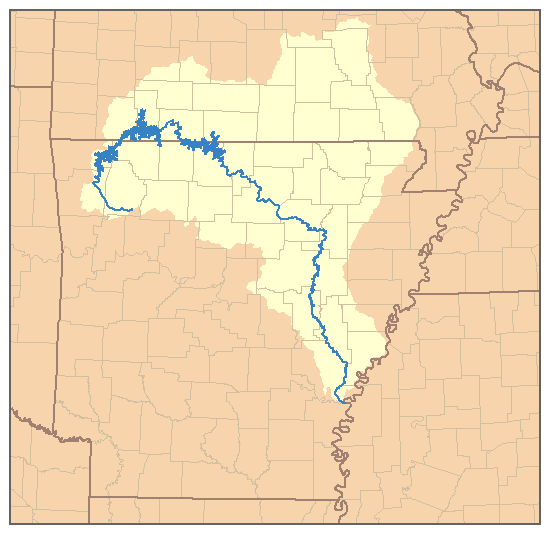
White River Drainage Basin

- Mississippi River
  - White River
    - Arkansas Post Canal
    - La Grue Bayou
    - Big Creek
    - Cache River
      - Bayou De View
    - Bayou des Arc
    - Little Red River
    - Village Creek
    - Black River
      - Strawberry River
        - Little Strawberry River
      - Spring River
        - Warm Fork Spring River
        - Eleven Point River
      - Fourche River
      - Current River
        - Little Black River
    - North Fork River
      - Bennetts River
    - Buffalo River
      - Little Buffalo River
    - Crooked Creek
    - Kings River
    - Hickory Creek

=== St. Francis River ===
- Mississippi River
  - St. Francis River
    - L'Anguille River
    - Tyronza River
    - Little River

== By size ==
Rivers are measured by their mean annual flow of water in cubic feet per second (cuft/s). 1 cubic foot per second equals 0.028 m^{3}/s.

River	Flow		Location of monitoring station	Notes
River	cu ft/s	m^{3}/s	Location of monitoring station	Notes
Mississippi River	671,500	19,010	near Vicksburg, Mississippi	
Arkansas River	47,970	1,358	Murray Dam, near Little Rock	
White River	26,760	758	near De Valls Bluff	
Red River	19,230	545	near Spring Bank	
Ouachita River	11,012	311.8	near Louisiana border	
St. Francis	10,000	280	below junction with L'Anguille River	estimated from limited data from US Army Corps of Engineers. See notes, below
Black River	9,893	280.1	near Elgin Ferry	
Little River	4,621	130.9	near Millwood Lake	no measurement gauge nearby; probably 1,000–2,000 cu ft/s (28–57 m^{3}/s) higher flow
Current River	2,802	79.3	near Doniphan, Missouri	
Saline River	2,629	74.4	near Rye	
Little Red River	1,777	50.3	near Dewey	
Spring River	1,432	40.5	near Imboden	
Buffalo River	1,379	39.0	near Harriet	
Cache River	1,369	38.8	near Cotton Plant	
Bayou Bartholomew	1,221	34.6	near Portland	
Eleven Point River	1,157	32.8	near Ravenden Springs	
L'Anguille River	1,085	30.7	near Palestine	
Petit Jean River	828	23.4	near Danville	
Crooked Creek	669	18.9	near Yellville	
Illinois River	622	17.6	near Siloam Springs	larger downstream in Oklahoma
Kings River	582	16.5	near Berryville	
Mulberry River	557	15.8	near Mulberry	
Lee Creek	531	15.0	near Van Buren	
Big Piney Creek	481	13.6	near Dover	
Smackover Creek	415	11.8	near Smackover	
Saline River	385	10.9	near Lockesburg	
Illinois Bayou	379	10.7	near Scottsville	
Mammoth Spring	351	9.9	near Mammoth Spring	
War Eagle Creek	295	8.4	near Hindsville	
Antoine Creek	278	7.9	near Antoine	
Cadron Creek	271	7.7	near Guy	
Caddo River	266	7.5	near Caddo Gap	upper course, larger downstream
West Fork Point Remove Creek	257	7.3	near Hattieville	
Moro Creek	256	7.2	near Fordyce	
Bayou Macon	240	6.8	near Eudora	
South Fork of Little Red River	238	6.7	near Clinton	
Cossatot River	187	5.3	near Vandervoort	upper course, larger downstream
Richland Creek	179	5.1	near Goshen	
West Fork White River	166	4.7	near Fayetteville	
Little Missouri River	148	4.2	near Langley	
James Fork	147	4.2	near Hackett	
Osage Creek	134	3.8	near Elm Springs	
Richland Creek	118	3.3	near Witts Spring	
Bear Creek	108	3.1	near Silver Hill	
Rolling Fork River	?			No measurement gauge, but hundreds of cubic feet
Strawberry River	?			No measurement gauge, but hundreds of cubic feet

Notes and sources: There are two Richland Creeks and two Saline Rivers in Arkansas. Flow of rivers differs substantially between years and seasons. Source for all rivers except St. Francis is the "USGS Water-Data Report – 2012" at https://waterdata.usgs.gov/ar/nwis/current/?type=flow&group_key=basin_cd; The flow of the St. Francis River flow is estimated from US Army Corps of Engineers data at

== Alphabetically ==
- Antoine River
- Arkansas River
- Bayou De View
- Bayou des Arc
- Bayou Macon
- Bennetts River
- Big Piney Creek
- Big Sugar Creek
- Black River
- Boeuf River
- Buffalo National River or Buffalo River
- Cache River
- Caddo River
- Cossatot River
- Current River
- Dorcheat Bayou
- Eleven Point River
- Flint Creek
- Fourche La Fave River
- Fourche River
- Glazypeau Creek
- Illinois River
- James Fork
- Kings River
- L'Anguille River
- L'Eau Frais Creek
- Lee Creek
- Little Antoine River
- Little Black River
- Little Buffalo River
- Little Cossatot River
- Little Maumelle River
- Little Missouri River
- Little Red River
- Little River (Red River tributary) in southwestern Arkansas
- Little River (St. Francis River tributary) in northeastern Arkansas
- Little Strawberry River
- Little Sugar Creek
- Maumelle River
- Mississippi River
- Mountain Fork
- Mulberry River
- North Fork River
- Ouachita River
- Petit Jean River
- Poteau River
- Red River
- Rolling Fork
- Sager Creek
- St. Francis River
- Saline River (Little River tributary) in southwestern Arkansas
- Saline River (Ouachita River tributary) in southern Arkansas
- Spring River
- Strawberry River
- Sulphur River
- Tanyard Creek
- Tyronza River
- White River

== See also ==
- List of rivers in the United States
