= Bella Vista Water Tank =

- U.S. National Register of Historic Places
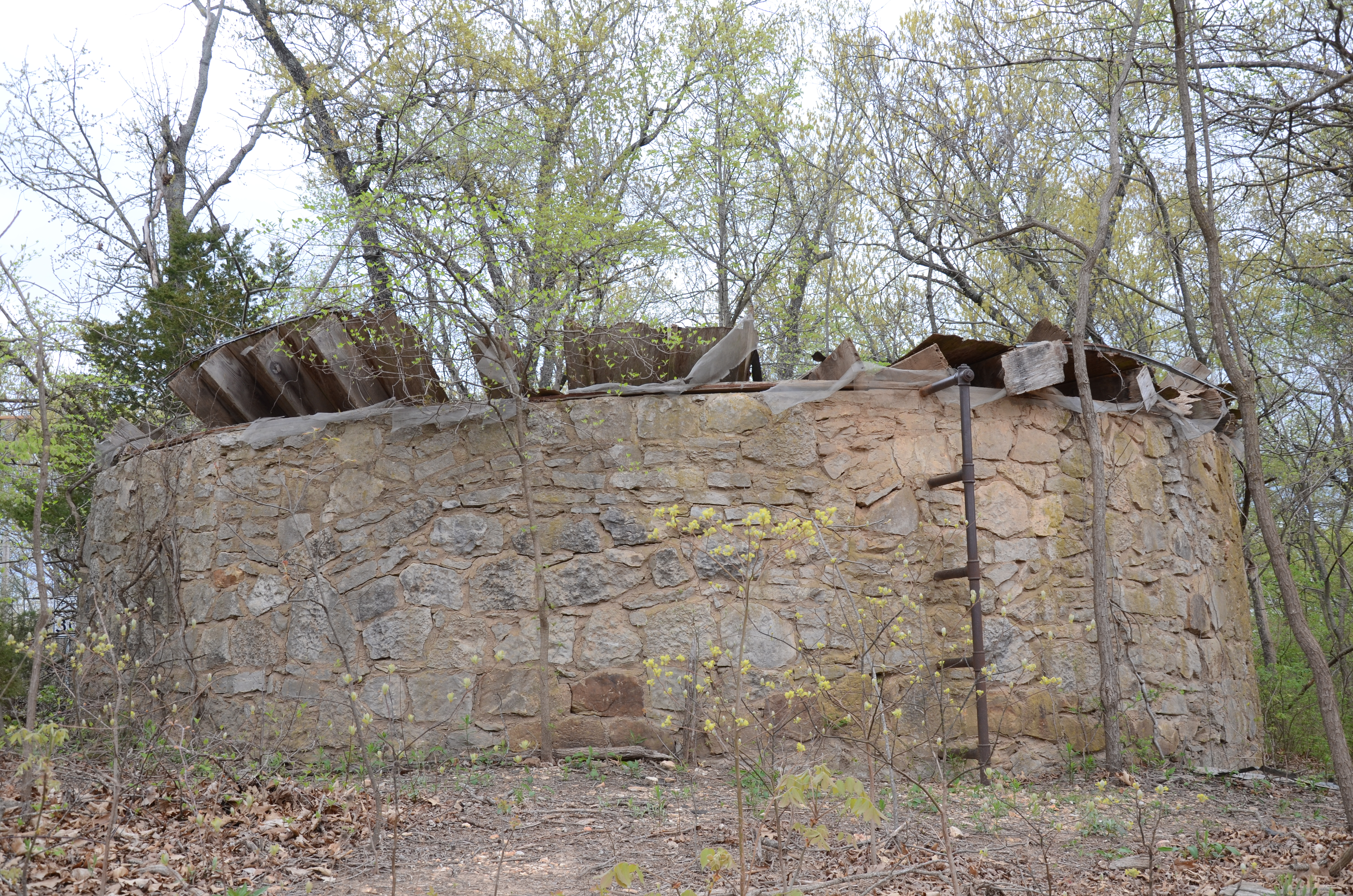

- Location within Arkansas Location within the United States
- Nearest city: Bella Vista, Arkansas
- Coordinates: 36°25′43″N 94°14′47″W
- Area: less than one acre
- Built: 1927
- MPS: Benton County MRA
- NRHP reference No.: 92000985
- Added to NRHP: August 14, 1992

The Bella Vista Water Tank is a historic water tank at the junction of Cedar Crest and Cunningham Drives in Bella Vista, Arkansas. This native stone tank was built in 1927 by the Linebarger Brothers, under the supervision of Wallard Braithwaite, to store water for summer cottages on the west side of Lake Bella Vista and later the Sunset Hotel. It is significant as the only known water tank of its type in Benton County, Arkansas, and for its association with the early development of Bella Vista.

From 1927 to 1952, water from the Big Spring east of the lake, 1.5 miles away and 310 feet lower, was pumped by hydraulic rams to the tank and then flowed by gravity to the cottages and hotel. The tank was added to the National Register of Historic Places in 1992, and is now owned by the Bella Vista Historical Society. A new roof was constructed in 2016 by the Benton County Sheriff's Work Detail Team, supervised by Deputy Mark Wibert, with funding supplied by a Benton County Historic Preservation Commission Grant.

== See also ==
- National Register of Historic Places listings in Benton County, Arkansas
