= Bennetts Bayou =

Stream in the American states of Arkansas and Missouri

Bennetts Bayou is a stream in the U.S. states of Arkansas and Missouri. The stream source is in Howell County, Missouri, just south of US Route 160 west of Hocomo. The stream flows southwest into Ozark County, Missouri, and under Missouri Route 142 on the east side of Bakersfield. It then flows south through the extreme northwest corner of Fulton County, Arkansas, and into the northwest corner of Baxter County, Arkansas. It continues to the southwest and enters the northeast arm of Norfork Lake to the east of Gamaliel, Arkansas. The similarly named Bennetts River runs subparallel to Bennetts Bayou just to the southeast.

The stream source in Missouri is at 36°36′43″N 92°01′11″W and the river mouth in Arkansas is at 36°26′00″N 92°12′57″W.

Bennetts Bayou has the name of the local Bennett family.

== See also ==
- List of rivers of Arkansas
- List of rivers of Missouri
