= Sutherlin Cabin =

Historic house in Arkansas, United States

- U.S. National Register of Historic Places
- Location within Arkansas Location within the United States
- Location: 4 North Mountain, Bella Vista, Arkansas
- Coordinates: 36°26′6″N 94°13′39″W
- Area: less than one acre
- Built: 1924
- MPS: Benton County MRA
- NRHP reference No.: 87002344
- Added to NRHP: January 28, 1988

The Sutherlin Cabin is a historic summer cabin at 4 North Mountain in Bella Vista, Arkansas. Built c. 1924, it is the simplest of the handful of summer cabins in Bella Vista to survive from that period. It presents a single story at the front, but sits on a steeply sloping lot that provides a full second story at the rear. Unlike its contemporaries, it lacks projecting deck and porch sections, having only a narrow porch across its front, underneath the main hip roof. The cabin has bands of sash windows on all sides, interrupted only on the east side by the fieldstone chimney. The two levels of the cabin are not connected by an interior staircase.

The cabin was listed on the National Register of Historic Places in 1988.

== See also ==
- Pharr Cabin, at 2 North Mountain
- National Register of Historic Places listings in Benton County, Arkansas
