= Lake Bella Vista =

Lake Bella Vista may refer to:

- Lake Bella Vista (Michigan)
- Lake Bella Vista in Bella Vista, Arkansas
