= Strawberry River =

Strawberry River may refer to:

- Strawberry River (Arkansas), United States
- Strawberry River (Utah), United States
