= Glazypeau =

Glazypeau may refer to:

- Glazypeau Creek, in Garland County, Arkansas
- Glazypeau Mountain, in Garland County, Arkansas
