= Bennetts River =

River in Arkansas and Missouri, U.S.

Location
- Country: United States
- State: Arkansas and Missouri
- Region: Howell County, Missouri; Baxter and Fulton counties of Arkansas

Physical characteristics
- Source
  - location: Howell County
  - coordinates: 36°36′21″N 91°59′47″W
- Mouth
  - location: Baxter County
  - coordinates: 36°25′43″N 92°11′54″W
  - elevation: 548 ft (167 m)

Bennetts River is a stream in northern Arkansas and southern Missouri. The stream source is in Howell County, Missouri southeast of Hocomo on US 160. It flows south to the west of Moody, Missouri and crosses under Missouri Route 142. The stream flows south into Fulton County, Arkansas and turns to a westerly direction northwest of Viola. The stream crosses Arkansas Route 87 just south of Vidette and flows into Baxter County, Arkansas, and on into the northeast arm of Norfork Lake (Bennetts Bayou) across from the Gamaliel Campground.

Bennetts River has the name of has the name of the local Bennett family.

== See also ==
- List of rivers of Arkansas
- List of rivers of Missouri
