= Moody, Missouri =

Unincorporated community in Missouri, U.S.

Coordinates: 36°31′46″N 91°59′22″W

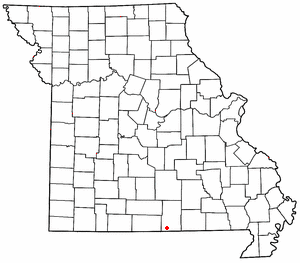

Moody is an Unincorporated community in southwestern Howell County, Missouri, United States. It is located 16 miles south of West Plains, just north of Route 142 on Route E. Bennetts River flows past the west side of the community. The Missouri-Arkansas state line is approximately 1.5 miles to the south.

A post office called Moody has been in operation since 1880. The community has the name of a pioneer citizen who also gave his name to Moody Creek, a small stream just north of the town site.
