= Blackwell-Paisley Cabin =

Historic house in Arkansas, United States

- Blackwell--Paisley Cabin
- Formerly listed on the U.S. National Register of Historic Places
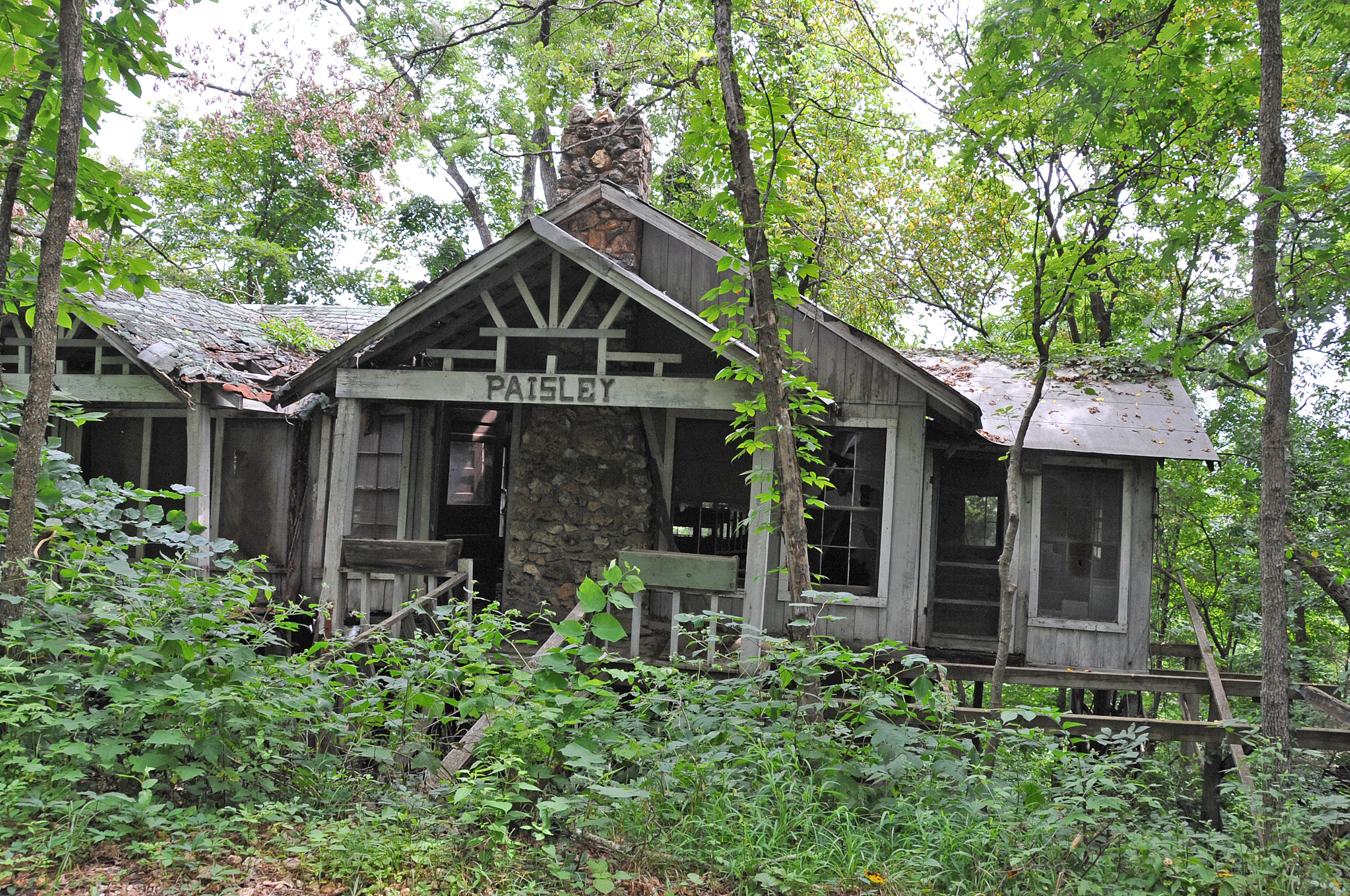

- Location within Arkansas Location within the United States
- Location: Suits-Us Dr., Bella Vista, Arkansas
- Coordinates: 36°25′49″N 94°13′59″W
- Area: less than one acre
- Built: 1924
- Built by: Cunningham, Roy
- MPS: Benton County MRA
- NRHP reference No.: 87002351

Significant dates
- Added to NRHP: January 28, 1988
- Removed from NRHP: October 7, 2026

The Blackwell-Paisley Cabin is a historic summer cabin on Suits-Us Drive in Bella Vista, Arkansas. It is a 1 1/2-storey wood-frame structure, facing west, with a front gable roof. A carport is attached to the south facade of the main cabin, and projects forward of it, with its own gable roof. The rear of the carport is screened to provide a sitting area. Bedrooms on two levels are sheltered only by screens on three sides. The cabin was built in 1924 by Roy Cunningham, who built many summer retreat cabins in Bella Vista. This cabin is one of the few surviving and relatively unaltered cabins in the area from the period.

The cabin was listed on the National Register of Historic Places in 1988.

== See also ==
- National Register of Historic Places listings in Benton County, Arkansas
