= Wonderland Cave =

- U.S. National Register of Historic Places
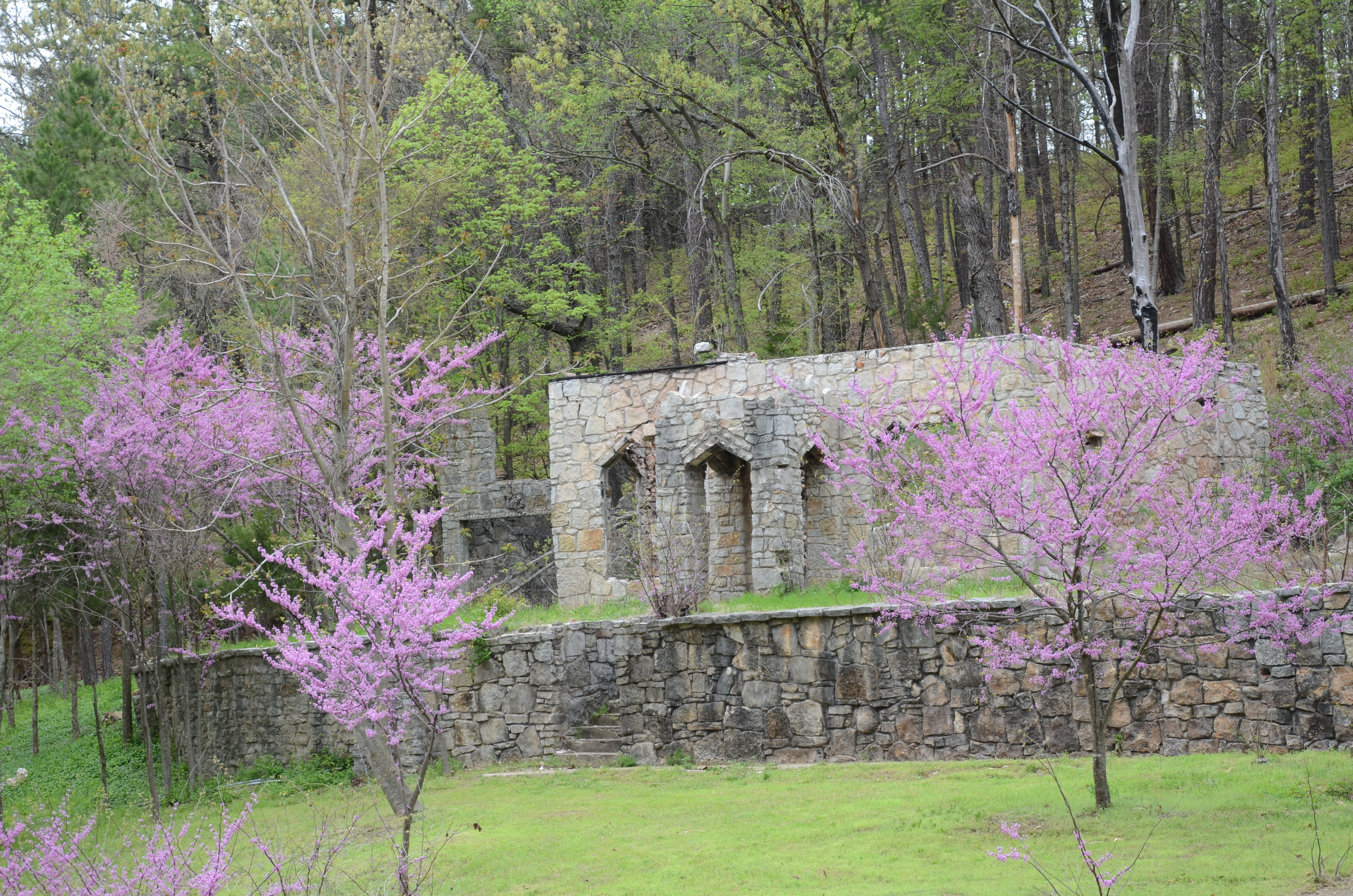

- Location within Arkansas Location within the United States
- Location: Dartmoor Road, Bella Vista, Arkansas
- Coordinates: 36°26′8″N 94°13′24″W
- Area: less than one acre
- Built: 1925
- MPS: Benton County MRA
- NRHP reference No.: 87002313
- Added to NRHP: January 28, 1988

Wonderland Cave is the largest cave in northwestern Arkansas. It is located on Dartmoor Road in Bella Vista, northeast of Bella Vista Lake and east of United States Route 71. The published report of the cave dates to 1868. Purchased in 1917, the cave was developed by Clarence A. Linebarger in 1929, opening it as a nightclub on March 1, 1930. Located 300 feet into the cave was a cavernous space hosting a stage for musicians, a bar, and wood/stone booths. The Arkansas State General Assembly met in the cave in 1931. In 1935, Linebarger started the Linebarger winery in the cave, sold under the brand "Belle of Bella Vista and Wonderland".

Portions of the facility have also been used historically for the aging of locally produced wine, and at least one session of the Arkansas General Assembly has been held in the cave. The cave ceased operations as a nightclub in 1960, remaining open for tours. In 1965 the cave was leased to Cooper Communities. The cave was used as a bomb shelter at the peak of the cold war in 1968. In 1988 the cave was shortly reopened as a rock-n-roll nightclub, but closed in 1995. Ownership of the cave has changed hands several times since 1995, with the acquisition by the Walton Enterprise group in 2019 being the most recent.

The cave was listed on the National Register of Historic Places in 1988.

== See also ==
- National Register of Historic Places listings in Benton County, Arkansas
