= Princedom Cabin =

Historic house in Arkansas, United States

- U.S. National Register of Historic Places
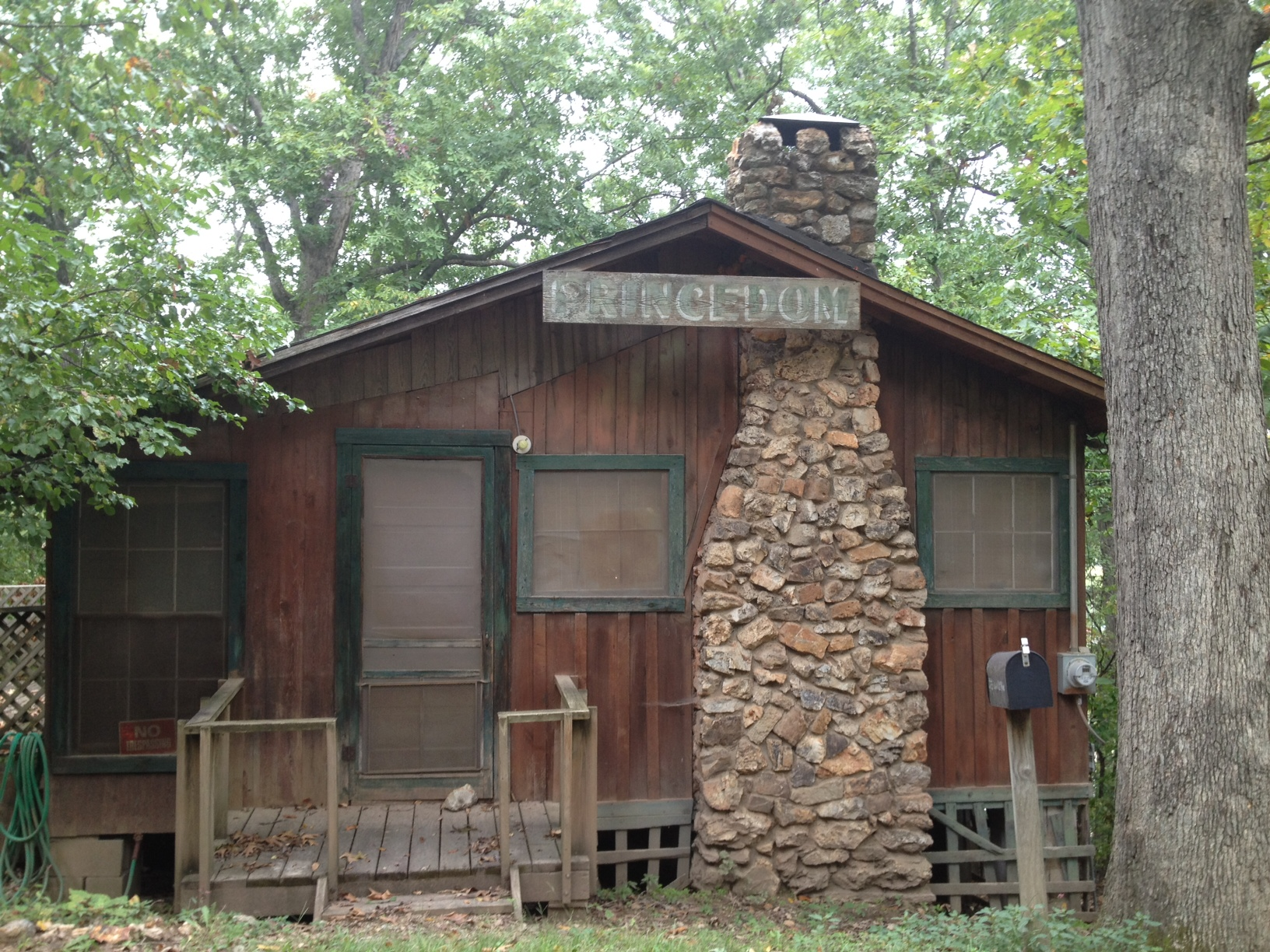

- Location within Arkansas Location within the United States
- Location: Lookout Dr., Bella Vista, Arkansas
- Coordinates: 36°25′39″N 94°13′52″W
- Area: less than one acre
- Built: 1923
- MPS: Benton County MRA
- NRHP reference No.: 87002347
- Added to NRHP: January 28, 1988

The Princedom Cabin is a historic cabin on the south side of Lookout Drive in Bella Vista, Arkansas. It is a wood-frame structure with one story facing the road, and two at the back of its steeply sloping lot. It is finished in board-and-batten siding, and has a low pitch roof, with a fieldstone chimney prominently placed at the front facade. Built c. 1923, this typical cabin of the period has been modified by enclosing its car port as a sleeping porch and building an open deck between it and the main cabin. It is one of a small number of surviving little-altered 1920s cabins built in the area.

The cabin was listed on the National Register of Historic Places in 1988.

== See also ==
- National Register of Historic Places listings in Benton County, Arkansas
