= Hagler-Cole Cabin =

Historic house in Arkansas, United States

- U.S. National Register of Historic Places
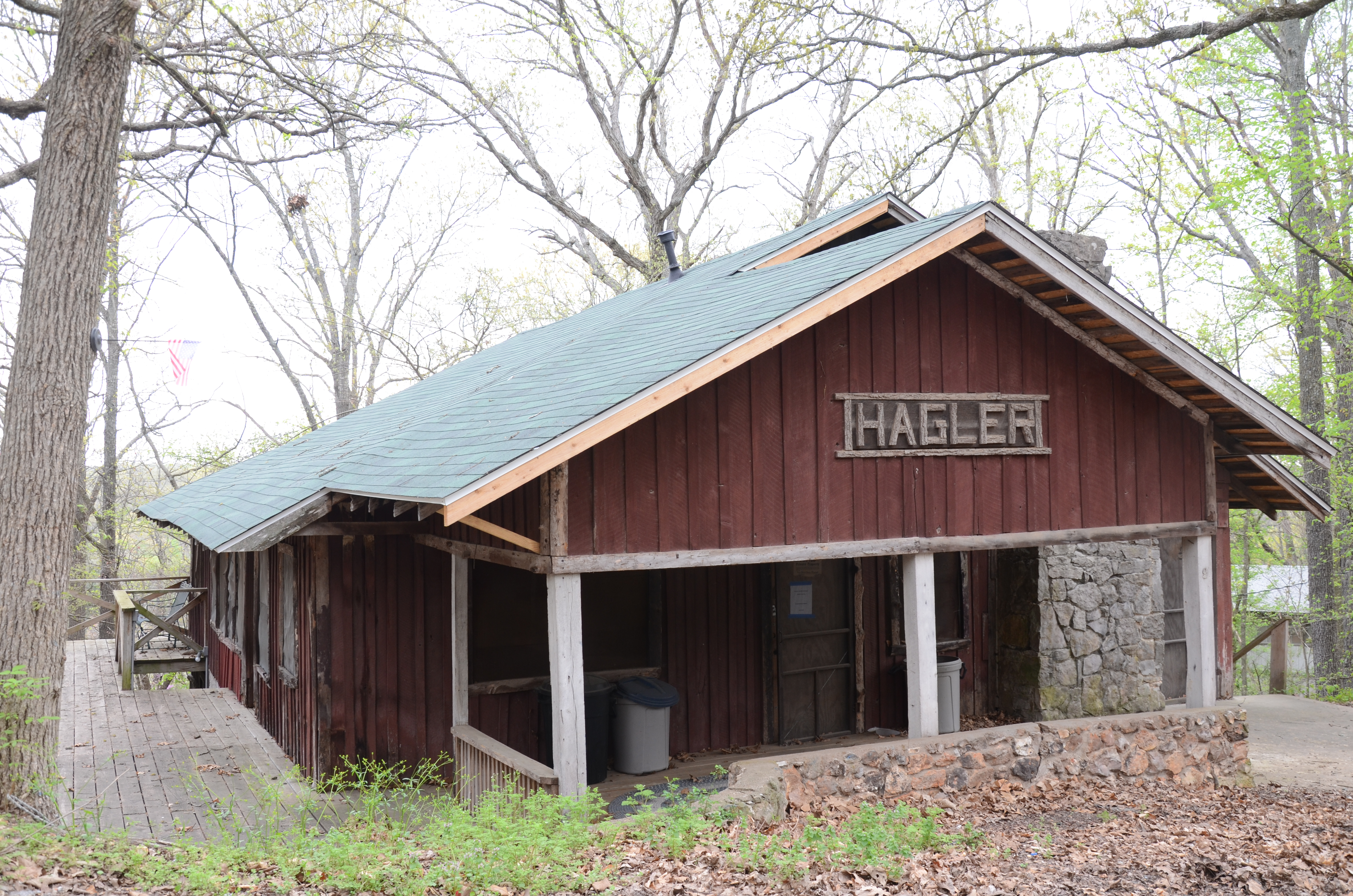

- Location within Arkansas Location within the United States
- Location: Mt. Pisgah Loop, Bella Vista, Arkansas
- Coordinates: 36°25′45″N 94°13′25″W
- Area: less than one acre
- Built: 1920
- MPS: Benton County MRA
- NRHP reference No.: 87002342
- Added to NRHP: January 28, 1988

The Hagler-Cole Cabin is a historic summer cabin located on Mt. Pisgah Loop in Bella Vista, Arkansas. It is a two-story wood-frame structure with a wide overhanging front gable roof, designed to present a single story to the front due to the steeply sloping lot. The front features a fieldstone chimney near the center, a corner entry to the right, and a projecting gable-roofed screen porch to the left. Built around 1920, it is one of the few relatively unaltered cabins (of some 500 originally built) in the Bella Vista area.

The cabin was listed on the National Register of Historic Places in 1988.

== See also ==
- National Register of Historic Places listings in Benton County, Arkansas
