= Antoine River (Arkansas) =

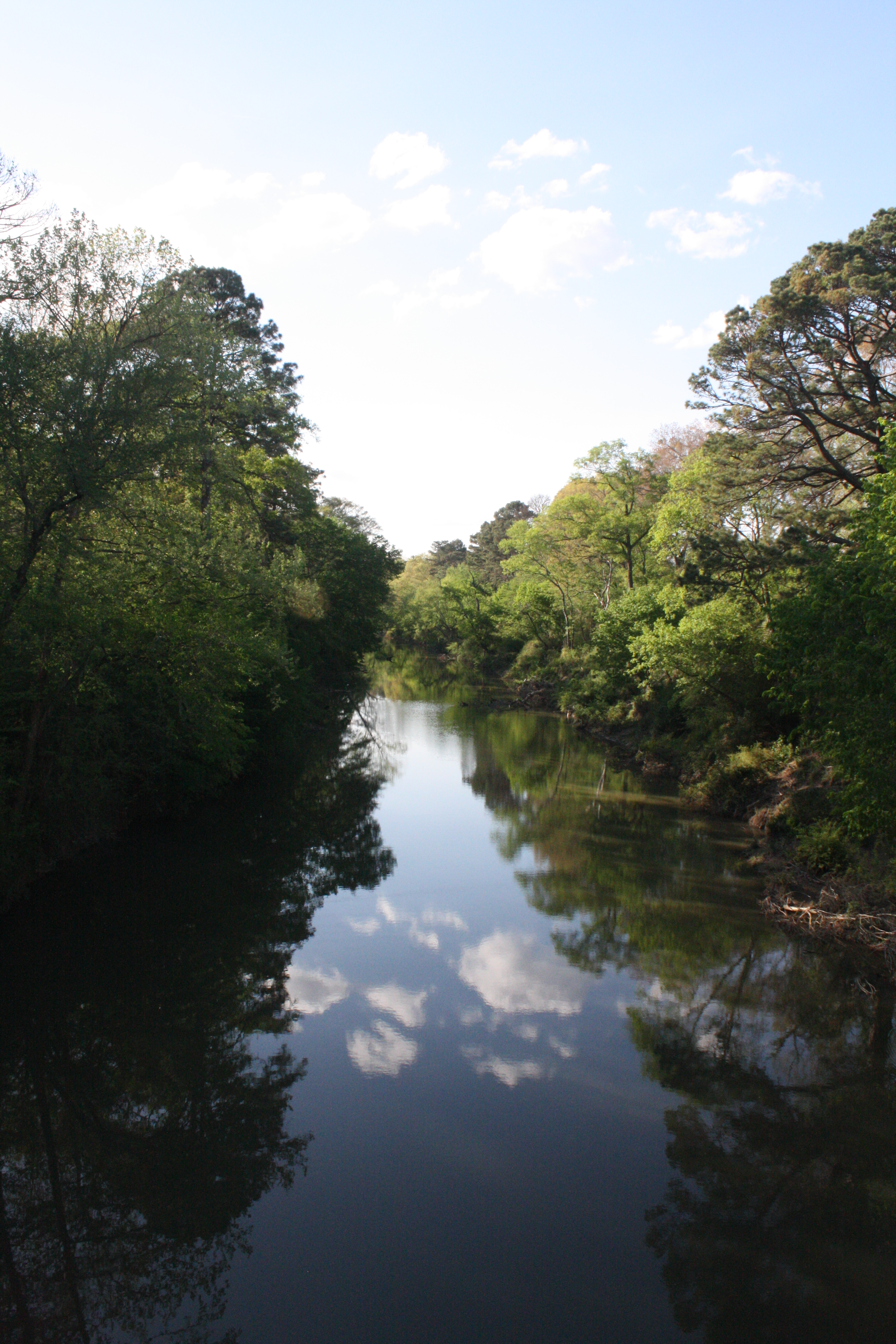

Location
- Country: United States
- State: Arkansas

Physical characteristics
- Source
  - location: 10 mi (16 km) west-southwest of Amity
  - coordinates: 34°18′00″N 93°38′40″W
- Mouth
  - location: 3 mi (4.8 km) southwest of Okolona
  - coordinates: 33°57′04″N 93°22′00″W
- Discharge
  - location: Antoine, Arkansas
  - average: 278 cu/ft. per sec.

Basin features
- Tributaries
  - left: Wall Creek, Woodall Creek, Camp Creek, Suck Creek, and Wolf Creek
  - right: Little Antoine Creek, Mathews Creek and Brushy Creek

The Antoine River is a 50.4-mile-long (81.1 km) tributary of the Little Missouri River in southwestern Arkansas in the United States. Via the Little Missouri, Ouachita and Red rivers, it is part of the watershed of the Mississippi River. According to the GNIS, it has also been known as Antoine Creek. A short headwater tributary of the river is known as the Little Antoine River.

== Course ==
The Antoine River rises in northeastern Pike County about 10 miles (16 km) west-southwest of Amity and flows generally south-southeastwardly, past the town of Antoine. For most of its course the river forms the boundary between Pike County and Clark County. The Antoine River joins the Little Missouri River about 3 miles (4.8 km) southwest of Okolona. For most of its length, the Antoine River crosses the Athens Piedmont Plateau, a series of east–west ridges that serve as the foothills of the Ouachita Mountains. The Antoine River is notable for rapid changes in water level after rains. It is primarily a clear and rocky stream, the last free-flowing river of any size in the Athens Plateau that has not been dammed.

== Tributaries ==
Most tributaries of the Antoine River are small rocky streams that flow in from the west. These include Wall Creek, Woodall Creek, Camp Creek, Suck Creek, and Wolf Creek on the west, and Little Antoine Creek, Mathews Creek and Brushy Creek on the east. The largest tributary of the Antoine River is Wolf Creek in southern Pike County.

== See also ==
- List of Arkansas rivers
