= Bogan Cabin =

Historic house in Arkansas, United States

- U.S. National Register of Historic Places
- Location within Arkansas Location within the United States
- Location: Cedarcrest Mountain, Bella Vista, Arkansas
- Coordinates: 36°25′40″N 94°14′2″W
- Area: less than one acre
- Built: 1925
- MPS: Benton County MRA
- NRHP reference No.: 87002352
- Added to NRHP: January 28, 1988

The Bogan Cabin is a historic summer cabin on a private spur road off Cedar Crest Drive, near Bella Vista, Arkansas. Built c. 1925, it is one of a small number of surviving cabins (out of about 500 originally built) in this hill resort area. It is a single-story wood-frame structure, with a gable roof that extends over a narrow open porch with a balustrade fashioned out of tree branches. A gabled wing extending to the east includes a covered carport and a porch, and a similar wing to the west shelters a deck. The cabin is surrounded on three sides by screened areas. The cabin represents a particularly creative use of outside spaces of the surviving cabins in the area.

The cabin was listed on the National Register of Historic Places in 1988, at which time it was painted white, also a departure from nearby cabins.

== See also ==
- National Register of Historic Places listings in Benton County, Arkansas
