= Lamberton Cabin =

Historic house in Arkansas, United States

- U.S. National Register of Historic Places
- Location within Arkansas Location within the United States
- Location: 8 North Mountain, Bella Vista, Arkansas
- Coordinates: 36°26′7″N 94°13′30″W
- Area: less than one acre
- Built: 1920
- MPS: Benton County MRA
- NRHP reference No.: 87002343
- Added to NRHP: January 28, 1988

The Lamberton Cabin is a historic summer cabin at 8 North Mountain in Bella Vista, Arkansas. It is a roughly square single-story wood-frame structure with a low-pitch gable roof. The roof is extended to the west by a shed-roofed sleeping porch, and there is an open deck to the east. The roof extends significantly beyond the walls, much of which consist of screened sections (there are no windows). The interior of the cabin, partitioned into living spaces, is further sheltered from the elements by the use of canvas shades. Built c. 1920, this is one a handful of period cabins to survive in Bella Vista, and one of its least-altered.

The cabin was listed on the National Register of Historic Places in 1988.

== See also ==
- National Register of Historic Places listings in Benton County, Arkansas
