= Fourche River =

Location
- Country: United States
- State: Arkansas, Missouri

Physical characteristics
- Source: near Poynor, Missouri
  - coordinates: 36°31′05″N 90°57′01″W
- Mouth: Pocahontas, Arkansas
  - coordinates: 36°16′03″N 90°57′01″W
  - elevation: 246 ft (75 m)
- Length: 32.4 mi (52.1 km)

The Fourche River is a tributary of the Black River in Northeast Arkansas and ending in Randolph County, Arkansas near Pocahontas at its confluence with the Black River. The source is the confluence of Fourche Creek and the west Fork of the Fourche Creek in Ripley County, Missouri. The Fourche River flows for 32.4 miles (52.1 km) in Missouri and Arkansas.

Other streams in Arkansas with similar names include the Fourche La Fave River that joins the Arkansas River near Bigelow, Arkansas and the Fourche Creek south of Little Rock, Arkansas.
