= Hickory Creek (Dobson Bayou tributary) =

Location
- Country: United States
- State: Louisiana
- Parish: St. Tammany Parish

Physical characteristics
- Source
  - location: St. Tammany Parish, Louisiana, United States
  - coordinates: 30°38′41″N 89°39′34″W
- Mouth
  - location: St. Tammany Parish, Louisiana, United States
  - coordinates: 30°37′25″N 89°50′30″W
  - elevation: 46 ft (14 m)

Hickory Creek (Louisiana)

Hickory Creek is a tributary of Dobson Bayou in St. Tammany Parish, Louisiana in the United States.
