= Hickory Creek (Establishment Creek tributary) =

Stream in the American state of Missouri

Coordinates: 37.9289422°N 90.2298415°W

Hickory Creek is a stream in Ste. Genevieve County in the U.S. state of Missouri. It is a tributary of Establishment Creek.

Hickory Creek was so named on account of hickory timber in the area.

== See also ==
- List of rivers of Missouri
