= Hickory Creek (Little Wyaconda River tributary) =

Stream in the US state of Missouri

Coordinates: 40.3011529°N 91.7846111°W

Hickory Creek (also known as Hickory Branch) is a stream in Clark County in the U.S. state of Missouri. It is a tributary of the Little Wyaconda River.

Hickory Creek was named for the hickory timber along its course.

== See also ==
- List of rivers of Missouri
