= Hickory Creek (Hickory Run tributary) =

Hickory Creek Hickory Run

Location
- Country: United States
- State: Pennsylvania, Ohio
- County: Mahoning County, Lawrence County

Physical characteristics
- Source
  - location: Lawrence County, Pennsylvania, United States
  - coordinates: 40°58′53″N 80°33′9″W
- Mouth
  - location: Mahoning County, Ohio, United States
  - coordinates: 40°58′25″N 80°29′33″W
  - elevation: 1,083 ft (330 m)

Hickory Creek (Earth)
Hickory Creek (the United States)
Hickory Creek (Pennsylvania)

Hickory Creek is a tributary of Hickory Run rising in Mahoning County, Ohio, and meets it confluence at Hickory Run's 8.00 river mile. It drains an area of 2.81 square miles (7.3 km^{2}), part of the Mahoning River watershed.
