= Fourche Creek (Arkansas) =

Stream in Arkansas, United States

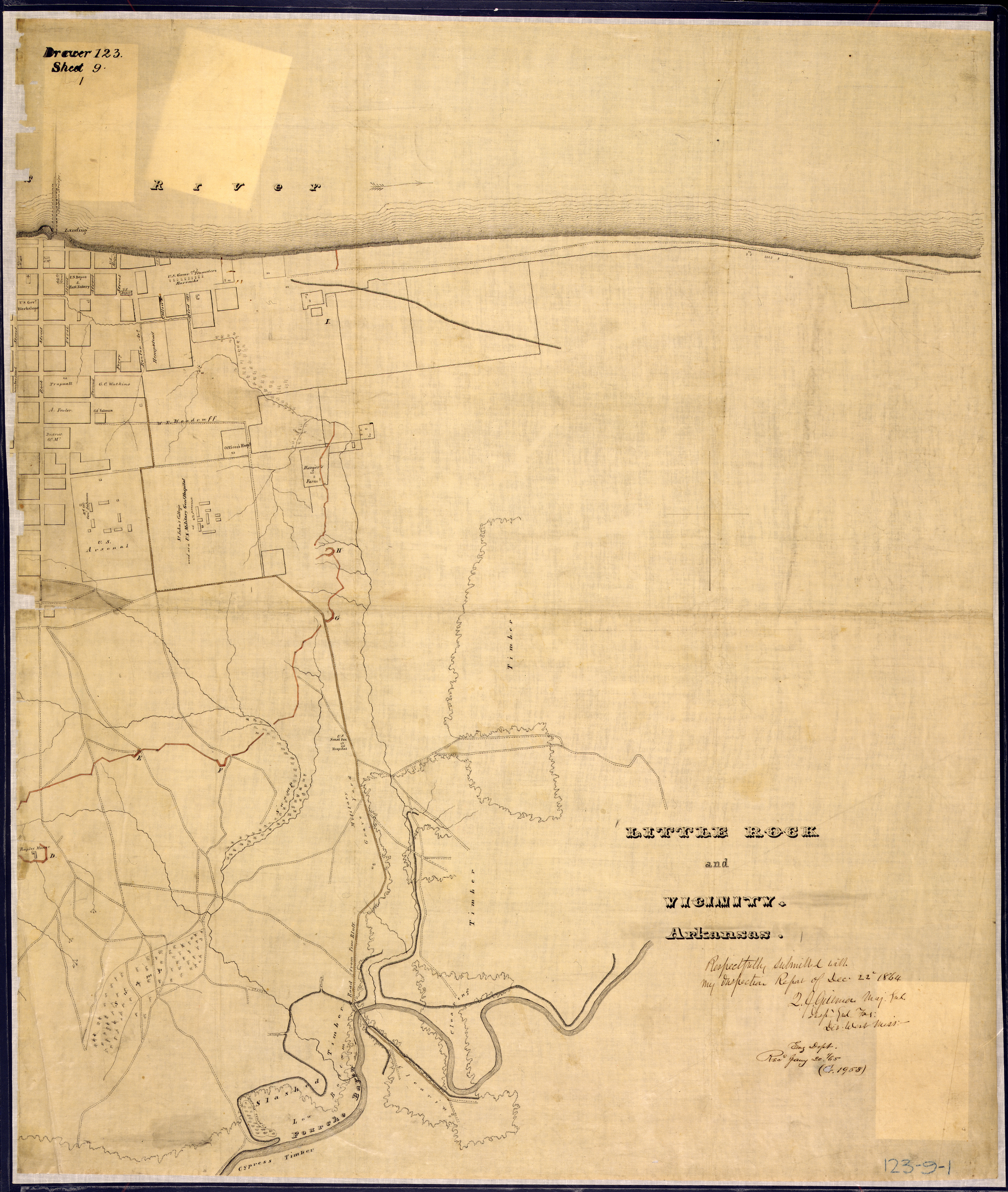

- Location of the mouth of Fourche Creek in Arkansas

Location
- Country: United States
- State: Arkansas
- Counties: Pulaski, Saline

Physical characteristics
- Source: near Little Rock, Arkansas
  - coordinates: 34°44′54″N 92°34′43″W
- Mouth: near Little Rock, Arkansas
  - coordinates: 34°43′36″N 92°11′17″W
- Discharge
  - location: University Avenue, Little Rock, Arkansas
  - average: 191 cu/ft. per sec.

The Fourche Creek (/ˈfʊʃ/ FUUSH) is a tributary of the Arkansas River in the U.S. state of Arkansas.

== Geography ==
Fourche Creek's largest tributaries are Fourche Bayou, Rock Creek, Otter Creek, Brodie Creek, Crooked Creek, and Panther Creek, as well as several smaller streams. It is arguably the most important urban watershed in the state of Arkansas for ecological, economic, and social reasons.

== History ==
The Quapaw tribe inhabited the region around the creek during the 1600s, and fished in the creek. Fourche Creek's name was given by French explorers. During the 19th century, one branch of the Trail of Tears crossed Fourche Creek, and the Battle of Bayou Fourche was fought in the area during the American Civil War.

== Environmental factors ==
The majority of the creek is within the city limits of Little Rock, Arkansas, and nearly 200,000 people reside within its watershed, which is 112 square miles (290 km^{2}) in size. The creek is the destination of 73% of the runoff within the city. Sewage from the Little Rock sewers sometimes accidentally enters the creek due to problems with the sewer system, and it has become polluted with trash. Development within the watershed has made the creek prone to flash flooding.

The city's wastewater treatment plant is located immediately above the Fourche/Arkansas River confluence, and the city of Little Rock cites the economic value and savings from natural purification in the Fourche Bottomlands to be in the millions of dollars.

Despite suffering decades of neglect and abuse, Fourche Creek supports a highly diverse population of flora and fauna and a core bottomland region that still maintains its wetland functions. The watershed also acts as an urban restoration area for education and demonstration. A revitalized watershed is of tremendous economic and social importance to Central Arkansas.

The Arkansas branch of the National Audubon Society is currently conducting numerous outreach, education, water quality improvement, and habitat improvement projects in the Fourche Creek watershed.

== See also ==
- List of rivers of Arkansas
