= Strawberry River (Arkansas) =

- Strawberry River at AR 56 bridge

Location
- Country: United States
- State: Arkansas

Physical characteristics
- Source
  - location: Fulton County
- Mouth
  - location: Black River
  - coordinates: 35.8825742°N 91.2187392°W
  - elevation: 230 ft (70 m)
- Length: 115 mi (185 km)
- Basin size: Mississippi River watershed
- Discharge
  - location: Poughkeepsie, AR
  - average: 504 cu ft/s (14.3 m^{3}/s)

The Strawberry River is a tributary of the Black River, about 115 miles (185 km) long, in northern Arkansas in the United States. Via the Black and White rivers, it is part of the watershed of the Mississippi River.

The Strawberry River rises in eastern Fulton County and flows generally southeastwardly through Izard, Sharp and Lawrence counties; it joins the Black River in the northeastern extremity of Independence County, 10 miles (16 km) north of Tuckerman. A minor headwater tributary of the Strawberry River is known as the Little Strawberry River.

== See also ==
- List of Arkansas rivers
