= Tanyard Creek (Arkansas) =

Stream in the US states of Arkansas and Missouri

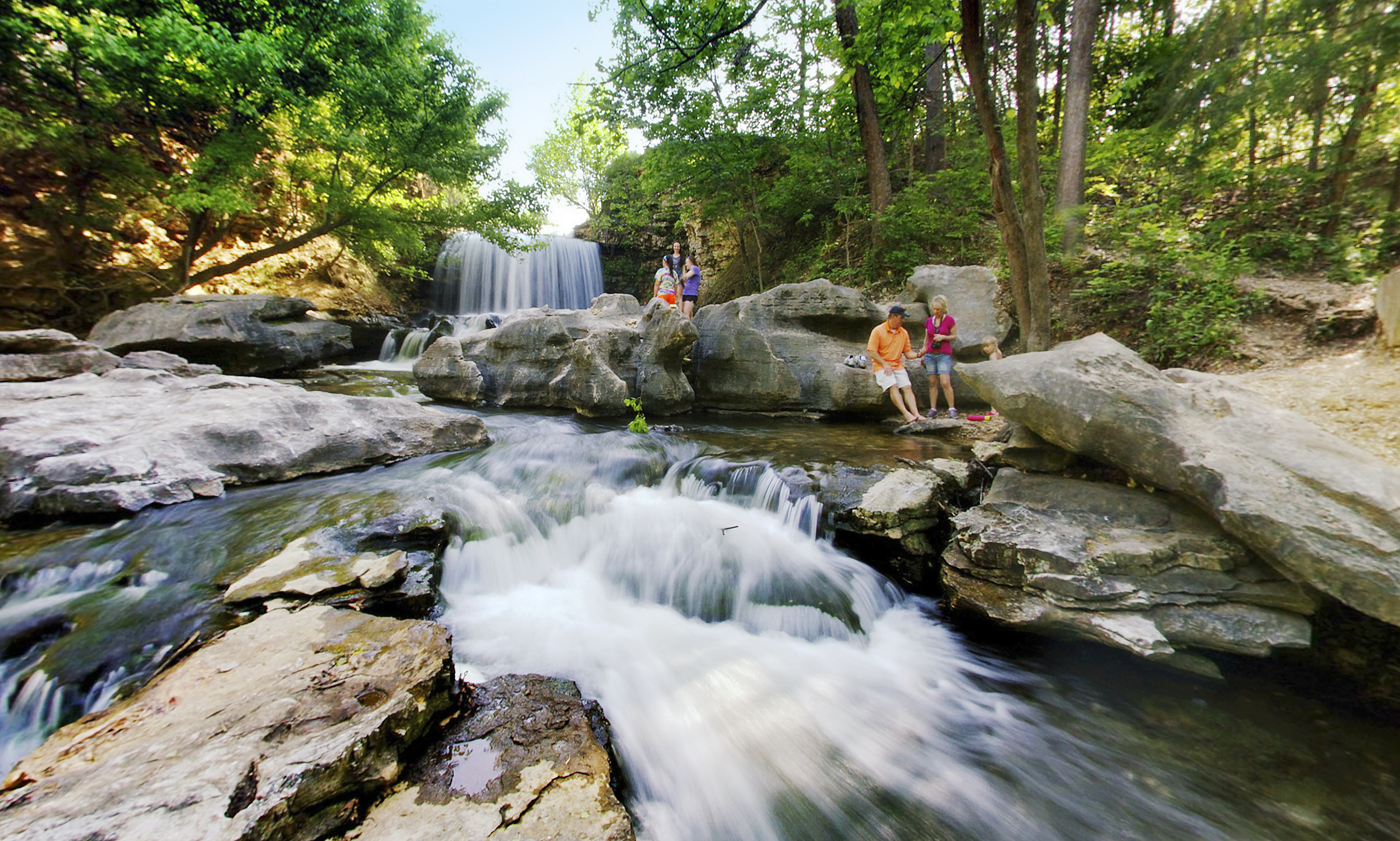
Tanyard Creek waterfall.

Tanyard Creek is a stream in Benton County in northwest Arkansas. It is a tributary of Little Sugar Creek in the Bella Vista resort region of northwest Benton County.

The stream headwaters arise about four miles northwest of Bentonville just east of Arkansas Highway 72 at 36°24′06″N 94°16′54″W. The stream flows north and northeast through the Bella Vista community where is contained to form Lake Windsor. Below the dam the stream crosses under Arkansas Highway 340 to its confluence with Little Sugar Creek just north of Bella Vista Village and adjacent to U.S. Route 71. The confluence is at 36°28′42″N 94°15′09″W with an elevation of 968 feet (295 m).
