= Pharr Cabin =

Historic house in Arkansas, United States

- U.S. National Register of Historic Places
- Location within Arkansas Location within the United States
- Location: 2 North Mountain, Bella Vista, Arkansas
- Coordinates: 36°26′7″N 94°13′40″W
- Area: less than one acre
- Built: 1920
- MPS: Benton County MRA
- NRHP reference No.: 87002346
- Added to NRHP: January 28, 1988

The Pharr Cabin is a historic summer cabin at 2 North Mountain in Bella Vista, Arkansas. It is a wood-frame structure with a gable roof, presenting a single story to the front, and two to the rear on its steeply sloping lot. A porch extends across the front (south-facing) facade, with a lower-pitch gable roof. A large fieldstone chimney rises through both of these roofs. An open deck runs along the eastern facade. The sleeping areas on the lower level are enclosed only by screening. The cabin was built c. 1920 and is one of a small number of little-altered cabins built in that period in Bella Vista.

The cabin was listed on the National Register of Historic Places in 1988.

== See also ==
- National Register of Historic Places listings in Benton County, Arkansas
