= Glazypeau Creek =

Stream in Garland County, Arkansas, U.S.

Coordinates: 34.5469°N 93.1825°W

Glazypeau Creek is a stream in Garland County, in the U.S. state of Arkansas.

Glazypeau is derived from the French "glaise à Paul", referring to a nearby salt lick.

== See also ==
- List of rivers of Arkansas
