= Hickory Creek (Peace River tributary) =

Tributary of the Peace River in Florida, US

Location
- Country: United States
- State: Florida
- County: Hardee County

Physical characteristics
- Source
  - location: Hardee County, Florida, United States
  - coordinates: 27°30′54″N 81°53′14″W
- Mouth
  - location: Hardee County, Florida, United States
  - coordinates: 27°26′25″N 81°51′10″W
  - elevation: 26 ft (7.9 m)

Hickory Creek (Earth)
Hickory Creek (the United States)
Hickory Creek (Florida)

Hickory Creek is a tributary of the Peace River in Hardee County, Florida in the United States.
