= Hickory Creek, Audrain County, Missouri =

Ghost town in Missouri, United States

Coordinates: 39°10′08″N 91°30′05″W

Hickory Creek is an extinct town in southeast Audrain County, in the U.S. state of Missouri. The community was on the north floodplain of the West Fork Cuivre River at the confluence of Hickory Creek along Missouri Route W. Middletown is five miles to the southeast in adjacent Montgomery County.

A post office called Hickory Creek was established in 1840, and remained in operation until 1873. The community took its name from nearby Hickory Creek.
