= Hickory Creek (White River, Benton County, Arkansas) =

Location
- Country: United States
- State: Arkansas
- County: Benton County

Physical characteristics
- Source
  - location: Benton County, Arkansas, United States
  - coordinates: 36°13′29″N 94°3′49″W
  - elevation: 1,380 ft (420 m)
- Mouth
  - location: Benton County, Arkansas, United States
  - coordinates: 36°13′31″N 94°1′50″W
  - elevation: 1,122 ft (342 m)

Hickory Creek (Arkansas)

Hickory Creek is a stream in southern Benton County, Arkansas in the United States. It is a tributary of the White River within Beaver Lake.

The stream headwaters arise in southern Benton County and northern Washington County in northwest Arkansas northeast of Springdale. The stream flows to the northeast and enters Beaver Lake south of the Hickory Creek Campground and southwest of the community of Pleasure Heights.

Prior to the creation of Beaver Lake the stream entered the White River just west of Martin Bluff and northwest of the community of Creech (which was in the northwest corner of Washington County about one mile east of its current location) at 36°14′23″N 94°01′35″W.
