= Hickory Creek (Grand River tributary) =

Stream in Gentry County, Missouri, U.S.

Coordinates: 40°05′55″N 94°21′04″W

Hickory Creek is a stream in Gentry County in the U.S. state of Missouri. It is a tributary of the Grand River.

Hickory Creek was named for the hickory trees lining its course.

== See also ==
- List of rivers of Missouri
