= Hickory Creek (St. Joseph River tributary) =

Stream in Berrien County, Michigan, U.S.

Coordinates: 42°05′07″N 86°28′39″W

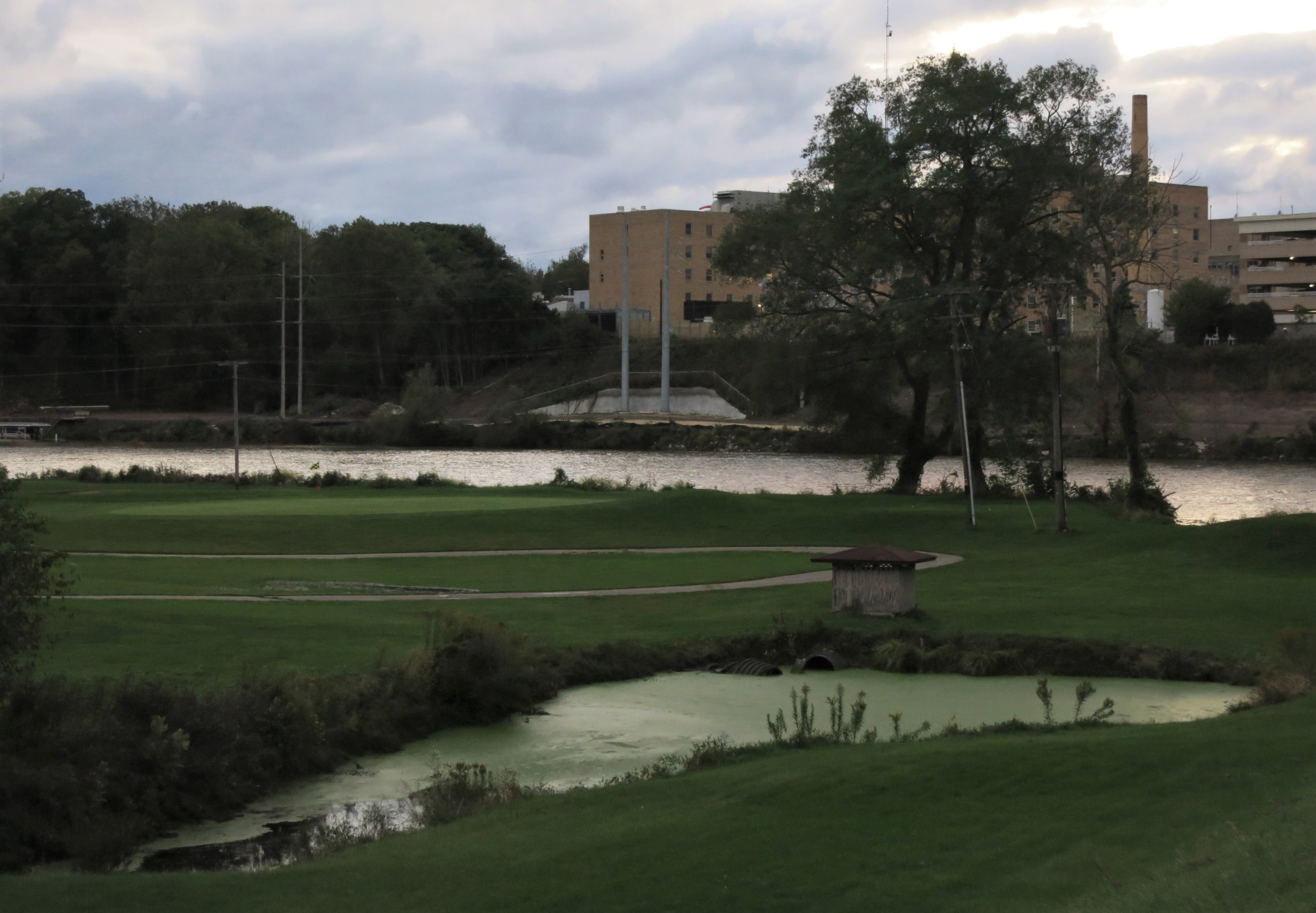
Hickory Creek (St. Joseph River tributary)

Hickory Creek is a stream in Berrien County, in the U.S. state of Michigan. It is a tributary to the St. Joseph River.

Hickory Creek was named for the hickory timber in the area.
