= Bella Vista, Arkansas =

- City
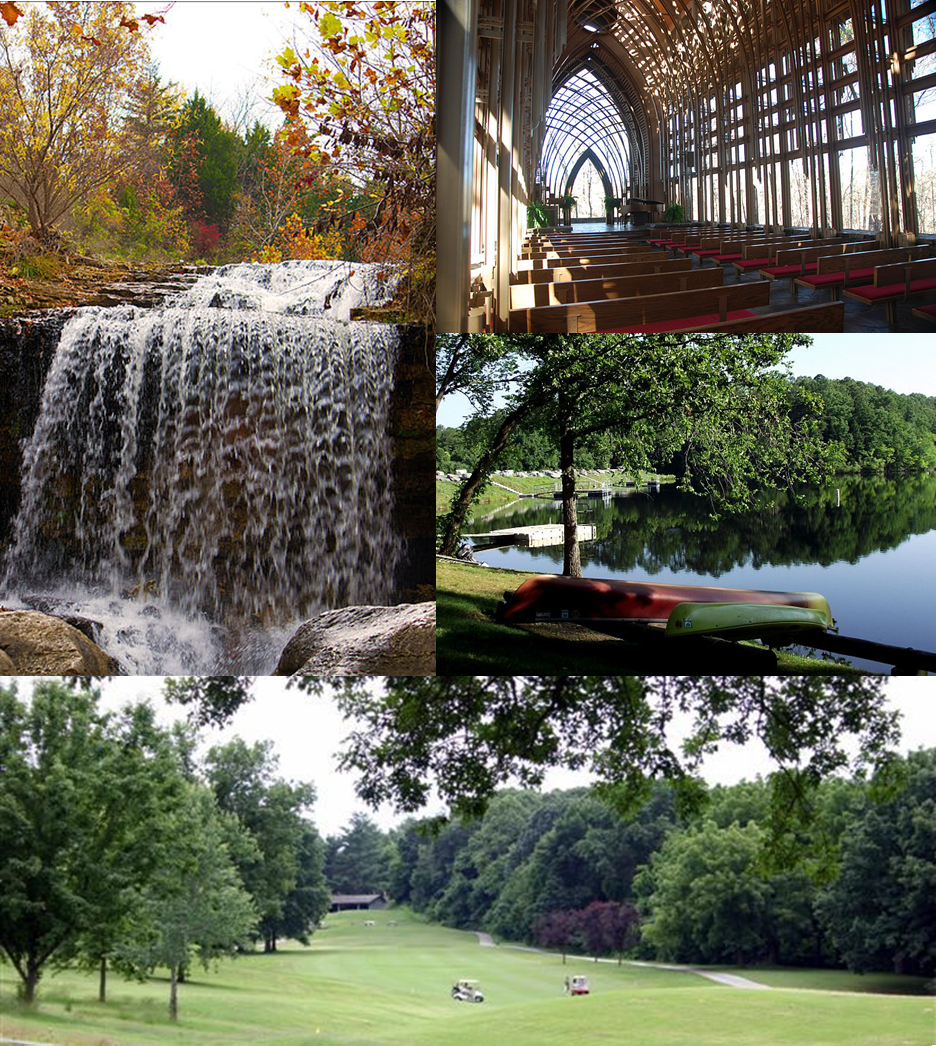
- Clockwise, from top: Mildred B. Cooper Memorial Chapel, Lake Ann, Bella Vista golf, and a waterfall along Tanyard Creek

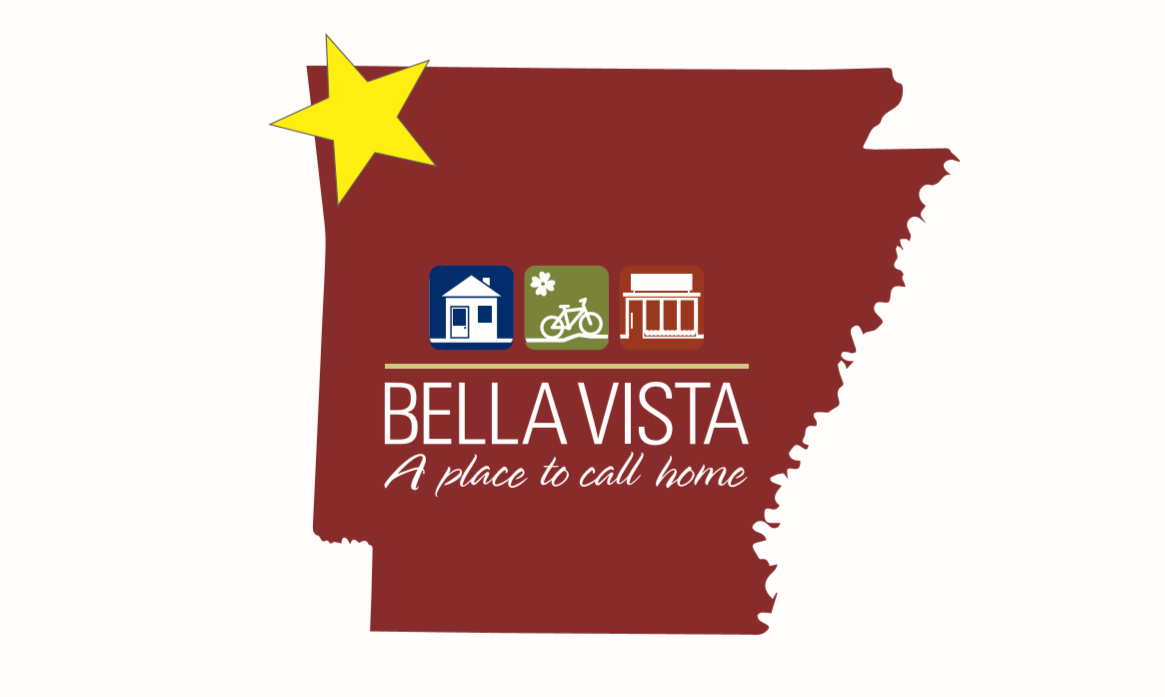
- Flag Icon

- Location of Bella Vista, Arkansas
- Coordinates: 36.466641°N 94.266317°W
- Country: United States
- State: Arkansas
- County: Benton
- Established: 1965
- Voted: November 7, 2006
- Incorporated: January 1, 2007

Government
  - Mayor: John Flynn
  - Councilmembers: Travis Harp; Wendy Hughes; Shea Newport; Larry Wilms; Anna Isbell; Craig Honchell

Area
  - City: 46.874 sq mi (121.403 km^{2})
  - Land: 45.304 sq mi (117.337 km^{2})
  - Water: 1.570 sq mi (4.066 km^{2}) 3.35%
- Elevation: 1,204 ft (367 m)

Population (2020)
  - City: 30,104
  - Estimate (2025): 34,518 ▲
  - Density: 715/sq mi (275.9/km^{2})
  - Urban: 373,687
  - Metro: 605,615
- Time zone: UTC–6 (Central (CST))
  - Summer (DST): UTC–5 (CDT)
- ZIP Codes: 72714, 72715
- Area code: 479
- FIPS code: 05-04840
- GNIS feature ID: 2405233
- Sales tax: 9.5%
- Website: bellavistaar.gov

Bella Vista is a city in Benton County, Arkansas, United States. The population was 30,102 at the 2020 census, and was estimated to be 33,274 in 2024. The community has taken advantage of the natural setting within the Springfield Plateau of the Ozark Mountains since first established in 1917 as a summer resort destination. The oak/hickory forests, valleys, creeks, and steep rises that characterize the city's topography have slowly given way to a series of reservoirs, golf courses, and other amenities. A largely residential city, early settlement was predominantly summer cabins, later giving way to single-family housing of a retirement community developed by Cooper Communities with services and amenities provided by a strong property owners' association (POA), more specifically the Bella Vista Property Owners Association.

Located within the Northwest Arkansas region, the city has been experiencing a population and building boom in recent years, as indicated by an 82% growth in population between the 2000 and 2020 censuses, largely as a bedroom community for nearby Bentonville and Rogers. Residents voted to incorporate in 2006, supplanting the POA with municipal government for most essential services.

== History ==
The area now encompassed by Bella Vista was used by groups of Osage and Delaware who utilized the area for seasonal hunting grounds. A prominent rock shelter known as Hay Bluff along US 71 was used by various groups in the area and remains an important archaeological site, before later being used by early settlers to store hay. The area was established as a primitive summer resort in 1909 by a Bentonville minister who envisioned golf, tennis, and inexpensive lots for summer cabins. In 1915, Lake Bella Vista was created by damming Little Sugar Creek. By 1916, the resort was sold to the Linebarger Brothers Realty Company, who further developed the resort to include more amenities, including the Sunset Hotel and Wonderland Cave nightclub. Early cabins recognized on the National Register of Historic Places include Blackwell-Paisley Cabin, Bogan Cabin, Hagler-Cole Cabin, Lamberton Cabin, Pharr Cabin, Princedom Cabin, and Sutherlin Cabin. The resort began catering to city dwellers with automobiles and came to include "colonies" of residents from Dallas, Texas and Tulsa, Oklahoma.

Bella Vista became a retirement community in 1965, and, after much contention and a 2006 vote of its property owners, became an incorporated city. Following its official incorporation on January 1, 2007, the new city government took over the police department, fire department, streets, trash removal and other city functions, while the Property Owners Association (POA) retained control of the many amenities available to members (property owners) and their guests.

== Geography ==
Bella Vista is located in northern Benton County. Its northern border is the Missouri state line. According to the United States Census Bureau, the city has a total area of 46.874 square miles (121.40 km^{2}), of which 45.304 square miles (117.34 km^{2}) is land and 1.570 square miles (4.07 km^{2}) (3.35%) is water, consisting mainly of the several lakes within the city.

== Demographics ==
Historical population
Census	Pop.	Note	%±
1980	2,589		—
1990	9,083		250.8%
2000	16,582		82.6%
2010	26,461		59.6%
2020	30,104		13.8%
2025 (est.)	34,518	▲	14.7%
U.S. Decennial Census; Encyclopedia of Arkansas; 2020 Census

=== Racial and ethnic composition ===
Bella Vista, Arkansas – racial and ethnic composition Note: the US Census treats Hispanic/Latino as an ethnic category. This table excludes Latinos from the racial categories and assigns them to a separate category. Hispanics/Latinos may be of any race.
Race / ethnicity (NH = non-Hispanic)	Pop. 2000	Pop. 2010	Pop 2020	% 2000	% 2010	% 2020
White alone (NH)	16,109	24,881	26,296	97.15%	94.03%	87.35%
Black or African American alone (NH)	30	169	209	0.18%	0.64%	0.69%
Native American or Alaska Native alone (NH)	113	258	294	0.68%	0.98%	0.98%
Asian alone (NH)	45	122	215	0.27%	0.46%	0.71%
Native Hawaiian or Pacific Islander alone (NH)	1	11	25	0.01%	0.04%	0.08%
Other race alone (NH)	2	28	69	0.01%	0.11%	0.23%
Mixed race or multiracial (NH)	114	304	1,642	0.69%	1.15%	5.45%
Hispanic or Latino (any race)	168	688	1,354	1.01%	2.60%	4.50%
Total	16,582	26,461	30,104	100.00%	100.00%	100.00%

=== 2020 census ===
As of the 2020 census, there were 30,104 people, 12,986 households, and 9,373 families residing in the city. The population density was 664.5 inhabitants per square mile (256.6/km^{2}).

The median age was 51.0 years; 17.7% of residents were under the age of 18 and 31.3% were 65 years of age or older. For every 100 females there were 93.4 males, and for every 100 females age 18 and over there were 91.2 males age 18 and over.

87.2% of residents lived in urban areas, while 12.8% lived in rural areas.

Of the 12,986 households, 22.4% had children under the age of 18 living in them. Of all households, 62.1% were married-couple households, 12.0% were households with a male householder and no spouse or partner present, and 21.4% were households with a female householder and no spouse or partner present. About 23.6% of all households were made up of individuals and 14.1% had someone living alone who was 65 years of age or older.

There were 14,062 housing units at an average density of 310.39 per square mile (119.8/km^{2}), and 7.7% were vacant. The homeowner vacancy rate was 2.5% and the rental vacancy rate was 10.2%.

Racial composition as of the 2020 census
Race	Number	Percent
White	26,687	88.6%
Black or African American	215	0.7%
American Indian and Alaska Native	314	1.0%
Asian	220	0.7%
Native Hawaiian and Other Pacific Islander	26	0.1%
Some other race	385	1.3%
Two or more races	2,257	7.5%

=== 2010 census ===
As of the 2010 census, there were 26,461 people, 12,986 households, and _ families residing in the city. The population density was 597.8 inhabitants per square mile (230.8/km^{2}). There were 13,241 housing units at an average density of 299.16 per square mile (115.5/km^{2}). The racial makeup of the city was 95.85% White, 0.66% African American, 1.03% Native American, 0.47% Asian, 0.06% Pacific Islander, 0.66% from some other races and 1.28% from two or more races. Hispanic or Latino people of any race were 2.60% of the population.

=== 2000 census ===
As of the 2000 census, there were 16,582 people, 7,818 households, and 6,004 families residing in the CDP. The population density was 252.8 inhabitants per square mile (97.6/km^{2}). There were 8,854 housing units at an average density of 135.0 per square mile (52.1/km^{2}). The racial makeup of the CDP was 97.87% White, 0.18% African American, 0.69% Native American, 0.27% Asian, 0.01% Pacific Islander, 0.20% from some other races and 0.78% from two or more races. Hispanic or Latino people of any race were 1.01% of the population.

There were 7,818 households out of which 13.5% had children under the age of 18 living with them, 72.4% are married couples living together, 3.2% had a female householder with no husband present, and 23.2% were non-families. 20.5% of all households were made up of individuals and 13.3% had someone living alone who was 65 years of age or older. The average household size was 2.10 and the average family size was 2.38.

In the CDP the population was spread out with 12.3% under the age of 18, 3.0% from 18 to 24, 16.4% from 25 to 44, 26.3% from 45 to 64, and 41.9% who were 65 years of age or older. The median age was 61 years. For every 100 females there were 92.5 males. For every 100 females age 18 and over, there were 90.9 males.

The median income for a household in the CDP was $44,090, and the median income for a family was $48,233. Males had a median income of $34,547 versus $24,690 for females. The per capita income for the CDP was $25,406. About 1.5% of families and 2.5% of the population were below the poverty line, including 3.7% of those under the age of 18 and 1.0% of those 65 and older.

=== 2023 American Community Survey ===
As of the 2023 American Community Survey, there are 12,894 estimated households in Bella Vista with an average of 2.39 persons per household. The city has a median household income of $85,932. Approximately 3.5% of the city's population lives at or below the poverty line. Bella Vista has an estimated 52.5% employment rate, with 37.8% of the population holding a bachelor's degree or higher and 96.1% holding a high school diploma.

The top five reported ancestries (people were allowed to report up to two ancestries, thus the figures will generally add to more than 100%) were English (97.7%), Spanish (1.6%), Indo-European (0.3%), Asian and Pacific Islander (0.4%), and Other (0.0%).

== Parks and recreation ==
=== Lakes ===
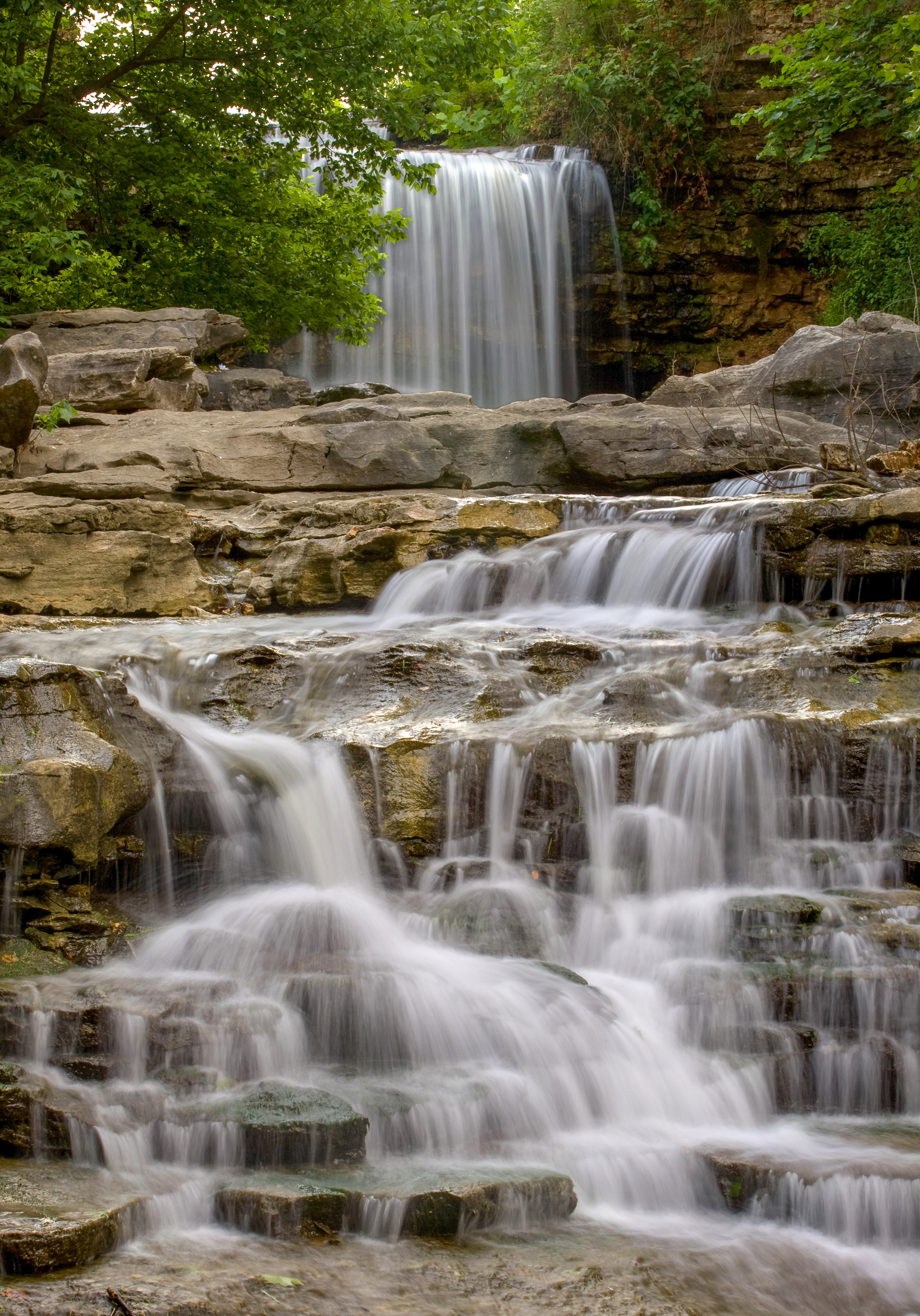
Tanyard Creek falling from Lake Windsor in Bella Vista

Bella Vista has seven private lakes, which members of the community or their guests are permitted to use. These include:

- Lake Ann - a 112.5 acres (0.455 km^{2}) man-made lake featuring water sports.
- Lake Windsor
- Loch Lomond
- Lake Avalon
- Lake Brittany - a 77 feet (23 m), 35-acre (140,000 m^{2}) limited-power lake.
- Lake Norwood
- Lake Rayburn

=== Trails ===
In the center of Bella Vista is the Tanyard Creek Nature Trail.

== Government ==
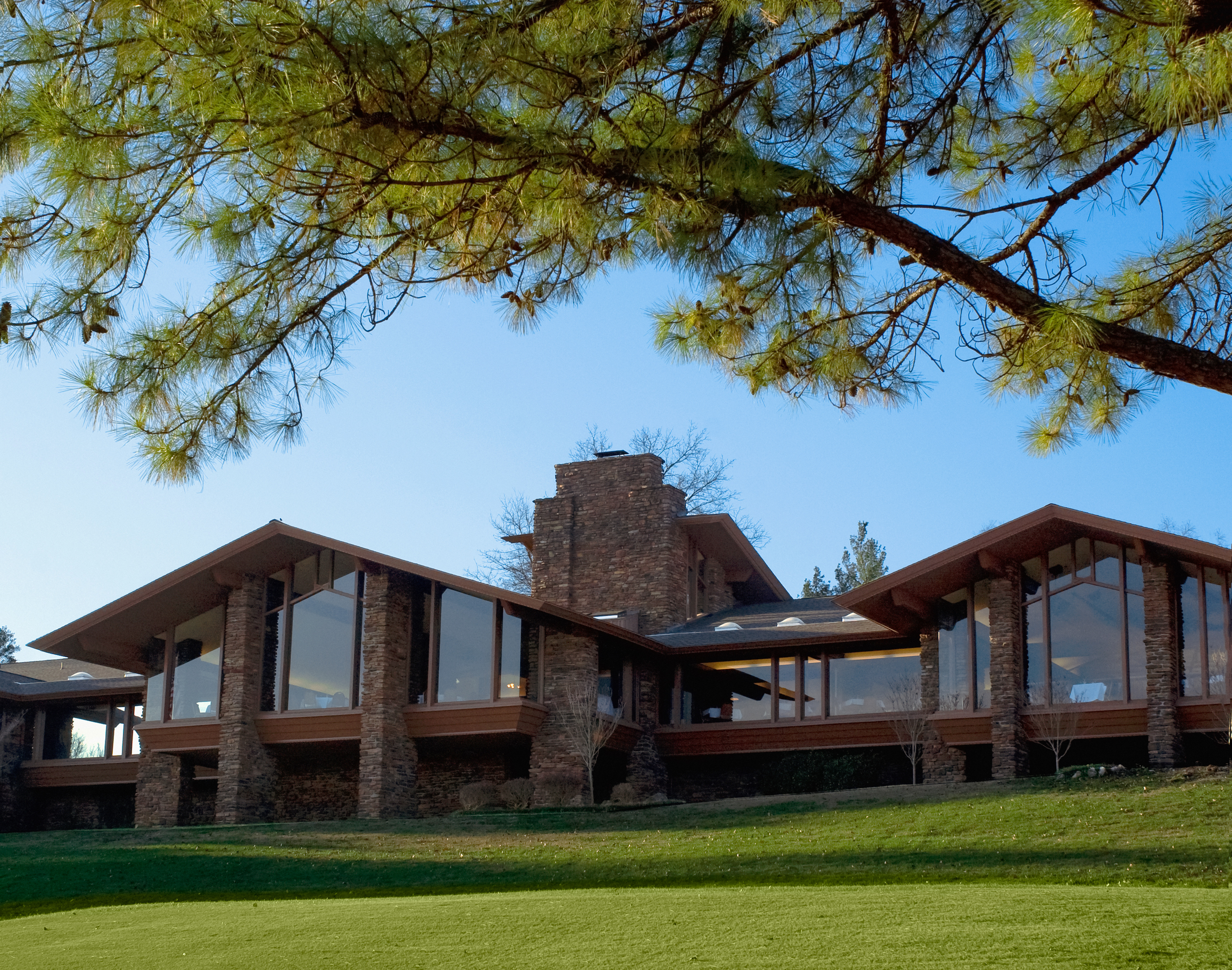
Property Owners Association

Bella Vista's Declarations and Protective Covenants is the "rule book" that governs the Property Owners Association (POA). Residents voted in 2006 to incorporate as an official city effective January 1, 2007. The POA still remains intact to service the recreational amenities and provide water, and the City of Bella Vista now has responsibility for police, fire, streets, library, community development, and other services.

== Education ==
The following school districts serve the city. On the east side and part of the west side is the Bentonville School District, and on the west side west of Camden Street is Gravette School District. A few blocks in the east are zoned to the Pea Ridge School District.

The Bentonville portion is zoned to the following schools:

- Cooper Elementary School, Thomas Jefferson Elementary School, and Sugar Creek Elementary School have separate sections.
- Most of the section is zoned to Old High Middle while some sections to the southeast are zoned to Ruth Barker Middle School and some to the southwest are zoned to Ardis Ann Middle School.
- Washington Junior High School and Lincoln Junior High School have separate sections.
- All of that portion of Bella Vista is zoned to Bentonville High School.

== Infrastructure ==
=== Electricity ===
Carroll Electric Cooperative provides electricity for Bella Vista residents.

=== Public safety ===
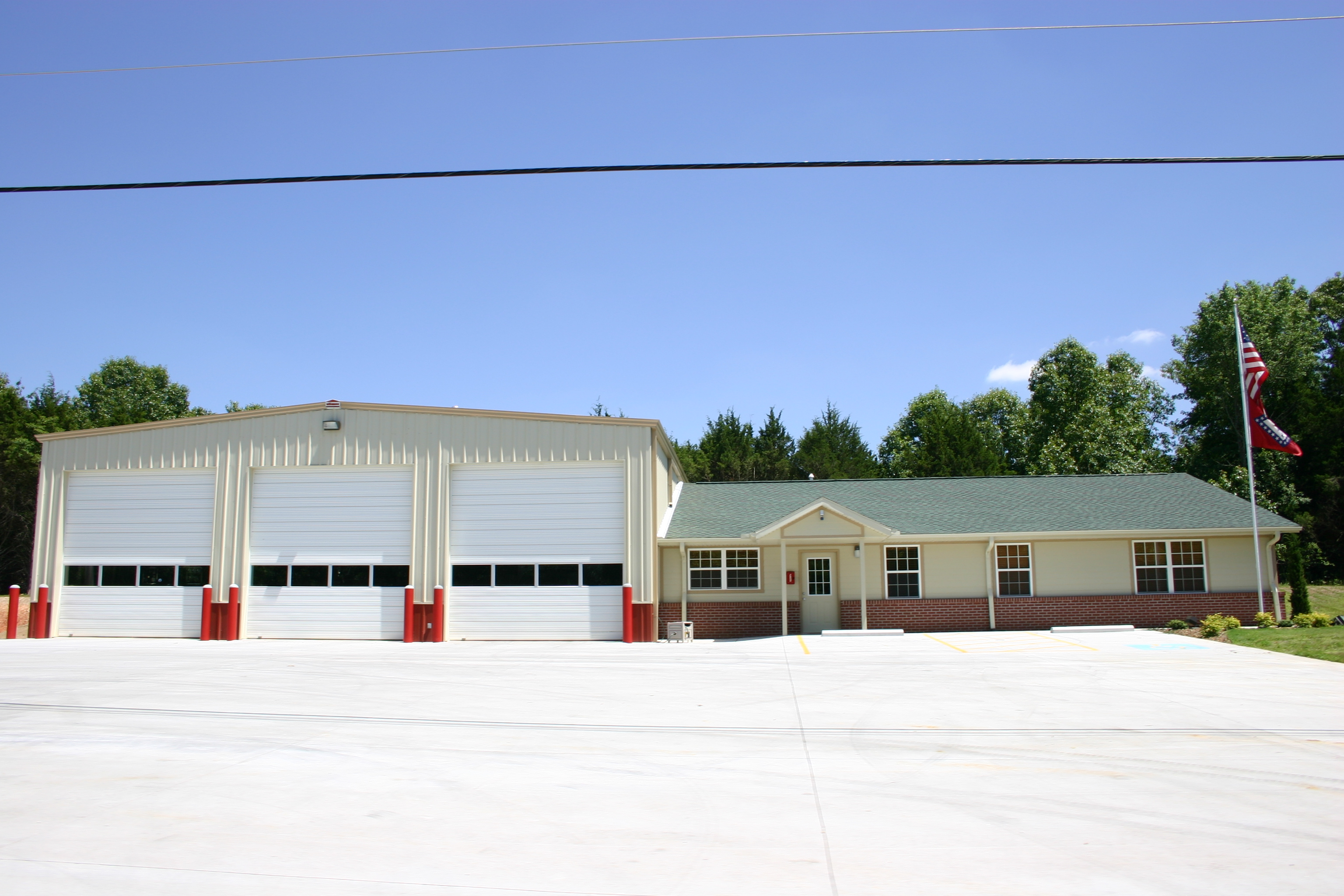
Fire station off Trafalgar Road

The Bella Vista Fire Department is a career fire department with four fire stations, and 63 firefighters. The fire department provides Advanced Life Support paramedic service to the city with six ambulances. In 2010, the department took control over the Bella Vista Ambulance Services.

=== Transportation ===
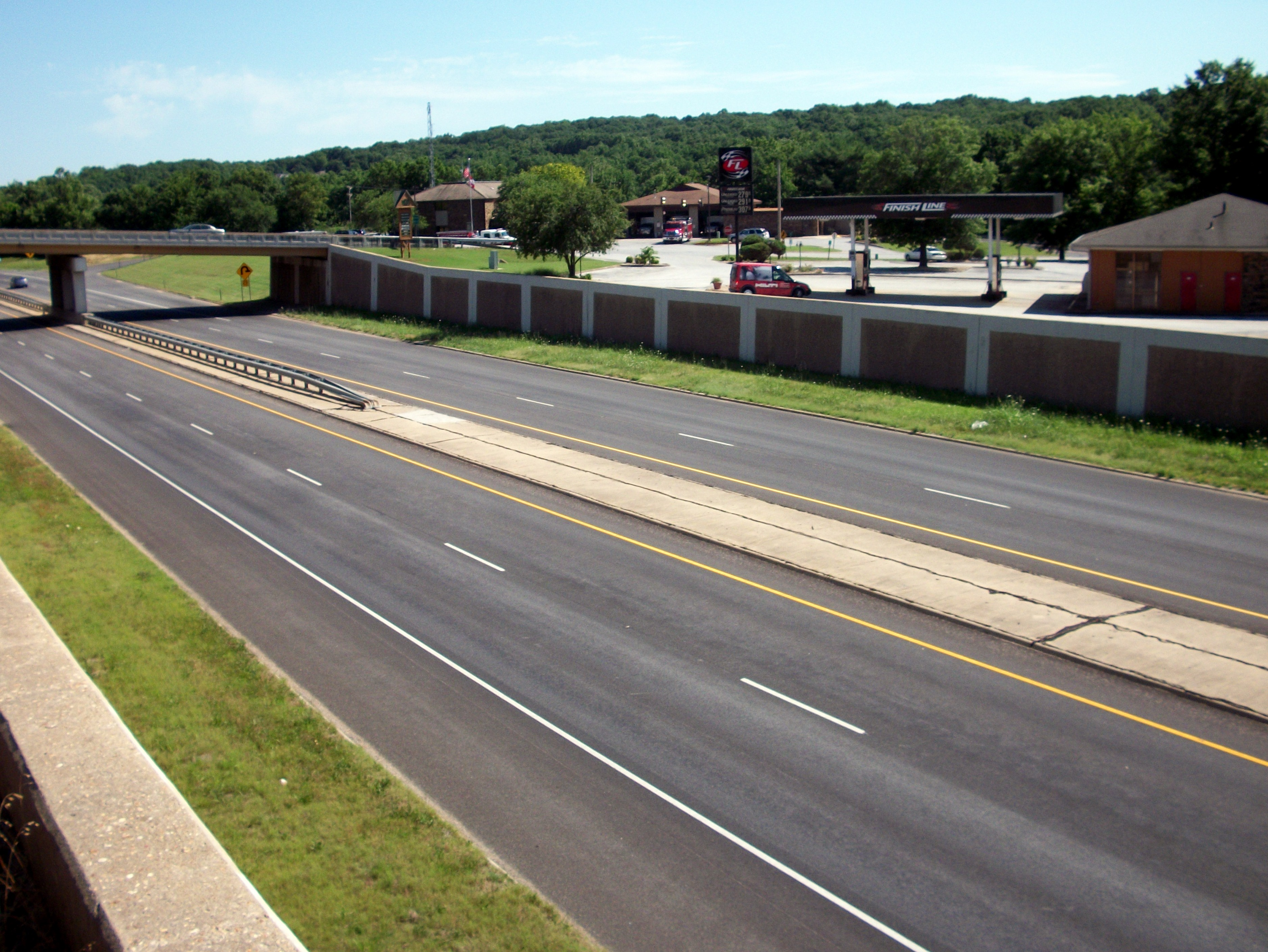
Bella Vista Way (US 71) at the Lancashire Boulevard (AR 340) exit in Bella Vista

The final segment of Interstate 49 (I-49)was completed around Bella Vista in 2021. The new route bypassed Bella Vista to the south and west, removing through traffic from Highway 71. Other highways include Highway 279 (Forest Hills Boulevard) and Highway 340 (Lancashire Boulevard).

==== Stump Dump Fire of 2018 ====
A dump site had begun an underground fire in August 2018. In December 2018, health officials declared the air within a half-mile radius around the property was at unhealthy levels on one occasion. An emergency declaration was made by Gov. Asa Hutchinson. The Bella Vista POA took over this project in early May 2019 and had the fire extinguished in less than 30 days.

== Notable people ==
- Donna Hutchinson, member of the Arkansas House of Representatives from 2007 to 2013
- Chris Mortensen, sports journalist who worked for ESPN for decades
- Jim Sheets, member of the Arkansas House from 1967 to 1968 in the Winthrop Rockefeller administration, retired resident of Bella Vista
- Garth Smith, award winning pianist, composer and musician noted for his contributions to LDS Gospel Music

== See also ==
- Mildred B. Cooper Memorial Chapel
