= Hocomo, Missouri =

Unincorporated community in Missouri, U.S.

Coordinates: 36°36′53″N 92°00′15″W

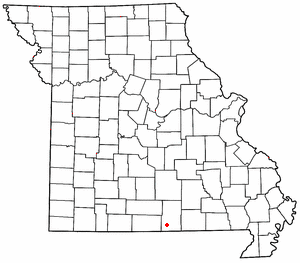

Hocomo is a small Unincorporated community in Howell County, Missouri, United States. It is located approximately thirteen miles southwest of West Plains on U.S. Route 160.

A post office called Hocomo was established in 1931, and remained in operation until 1981. The community's name is a contraction of "HOwell COunty, MO".
