= Hickory Creek (White River, Madison County, Arkansas) =

- Location in Arkansas

Location
- Country: United States
- State: Arkansas
- County: Madison

Physical characteristics
- Source
  - location: Madison County
  - coordinates: 35°48′45″N 93°51′44″W
- Mouth
  - location: Madison County
  - coordinates: 35°50′8″N 93°51′32″W
  - elevation: 1,368 ft (417 m)

Hickory Creek (the United States)

Hickory Creek is a tributary of the White River (Arkansas) in Madison County, Arkansas in the United States. Its GNIS I.D. number is 71948.
