= Hickory Creek (Illinois River tributary) =

- Location in Arkansas

Location
- Country: United States
- State: Arkansas
- County: Washington

Physical characteristics
- Source
  - location: Washington County
  - coordinates: 36°1′1″N 94°12′45″W
- Mouth
  - location: Washington County
  - coordinates: 35°58′5″N 94°15′3″W
  - elevation: 1,138 ft (347 m)

DRS

Hickory Creek (the United States)

Hickory Creek is a tributary of the Illinois River in Washington County, Arkansas, in the United States. Its GNIS I.D. number is 50050.
