= Hickory Creek (Little Missouri River tributary) =

- Location in Arkansas

Location
- Country: United States
- State: Arkansas
- County: Hempstead County, Pike County

Physical characteristics
- Source
  - location: Pike County
  - coordinates: 34°2′9″N 93°45′54″W
- Mouth
  - location: Hempstead County
  - coordinates: 33°57′28″N 93°33′47″W
  - elevation: 276 ft (84 m)

Basin features
- Tributaries
  - left: Lick Creek
  - right: Stony Creek

Hickory Creek (the United States)

Hickory Creek is a tributary of the Little Missouri River in Pike and Hempstead Counties in Arkansas, in the United States. The creek defines much of the border between the two counties. Its GNIS I.D. number is 50048.
