= National Register of Historic Places listings in Barry County, Missouri =

Location of Barry County in Missouri

This is a list of the National Register of Historic Places listings in Barry County, Missouri.

This is intended to be a complete list of the properties and districts on the National Register of Historic Places in Barry County, Missouri, United States. Latitude and longitude coordinates are provided for many National Register properties and districts; these locations may be seen together in a map.

There are 18 properties and districts listed on the National Register in the county.

This National Park Service list is complete through NPS recent listings posted January 23, 2026.

== Current listings ==
	Name on the Register	Image	Date listed	Location	City or town	Description
1	Camp Smokey/Company 1713 Historic District		February 26, 1985 (#85000513)	Off Park Rd. 36°34′43″N 93°49′30″W	Cassville	
2	Cassville Ranger Station Historic District		August 4, 2003 (#03000716)	MO 248; 36°40′23″N 93°51′32″W	Cassville	
3	David W. Courdin House		November 5, 1971 (#71000460)	2.4 miles SE of Monett; 36°54′01″N 93°54′26″W	Monett	
4	Downtown Monett Historic District		June 27, 2014 (#14000373)	Parts of the 200-400 blocks of Broadway & Bond; 36°55′16″N 93°55′28″W	Monett	
5	McMurtry Spring and Trail of Tears Roadbed Segment		July 23, 2018 (#16000366)	Address Restricted	Cassville vicinity	
6	Natural Bridge Archeological Site		May 5, 1972 (#72000704)	Address Restricted	Cassville	
7	Roaring River Camps and Hotel Summer Cottage		January 4, 2024 (#100009689)	24895 Farm Rd. 1135; 36°35′25″N 93°50′03″W	Cassville vicinity	
8	Roaring River State Park Bath House		March 4, 1985 (#85000500)	Off Park Rd. 36°34′46″N 93°49′49″W	Cassville	
9	Roaring River State Park Dam/Spillway	Roaring River State Park Dam/Spillway	February 28, 1985 (#85000518)	Off Park Rd. 36°35′29″N 93°50′00″W	Cassville	
10	Roaring River State Park Deer Leap Trail	Roaring River State Park Deer Leap Trail	February 26, 1985 (#85000519)	Off Park Rd. 36°35′30″N 93°49′56″W	Cassville	
11	Roaring River State Park Honeymoon Cabin		February 26, 1985 (#85000520)	Off Park Rd. 36°35′N 93°50′W	Cassville	
12	Roaring River State Park Hotel	Roaring River State Park Hotel	March 4, 1985 (#85000501)	Off Park Rd. 36°35′25″N 93°50′02″W	Cassville	
13	Roaring River State Park Shelter Kitchen No. 2 and Rest Room		February 26, 1985 (#85000521)	Off Park Rd. 36°35′01″N 93°50′07″W	Cassville	
14	Southwest Missouri Prehistoric Rock Shelter and Cave Sites Discontiguous Archeological District		October 24, 1991 (#91002046)	1 mile (1.6 km) east of Mineral Spring at the source of Rockhouse Creek; 36°40′08″N 93°44′57″W	Cato	Location is for Rockhouse Cave (23BY3), a part of the district
15	Tom Town Historic District		December 15, 1989 (#89002126)	Off County Road VV, S of Pleasant Ridge; 36°52′12″N 93°48′35″W	Pleasant Ridge	
16	Waldensian Church and Cemetery of Stone Prairie		January 18, 1985 (#85000100)	Rt. 2; 36°53′48″N 93°55′07″W	Monett	
17	Wheaton Missouri and North Arkansas Railroad Depot		February 10, 2000 (#00000085)	Junction of Main and Barnett Sts. 36°45′48″N 94°03′15″W	Wheaton	
18	White Way Oil Company Station		January 29, 2026 (#100012649)	5 Broadway Street; 36°55′11″N 93°55′39″W	Monett	

== See also ==
- List of National Historic Landmarks in Missouri
- National Register of Historic Places listings in Missouri
