= Cox College (Missouri) =

Medical college in Missouri

Coordinates: 37°13′30″N 93°17′24″W

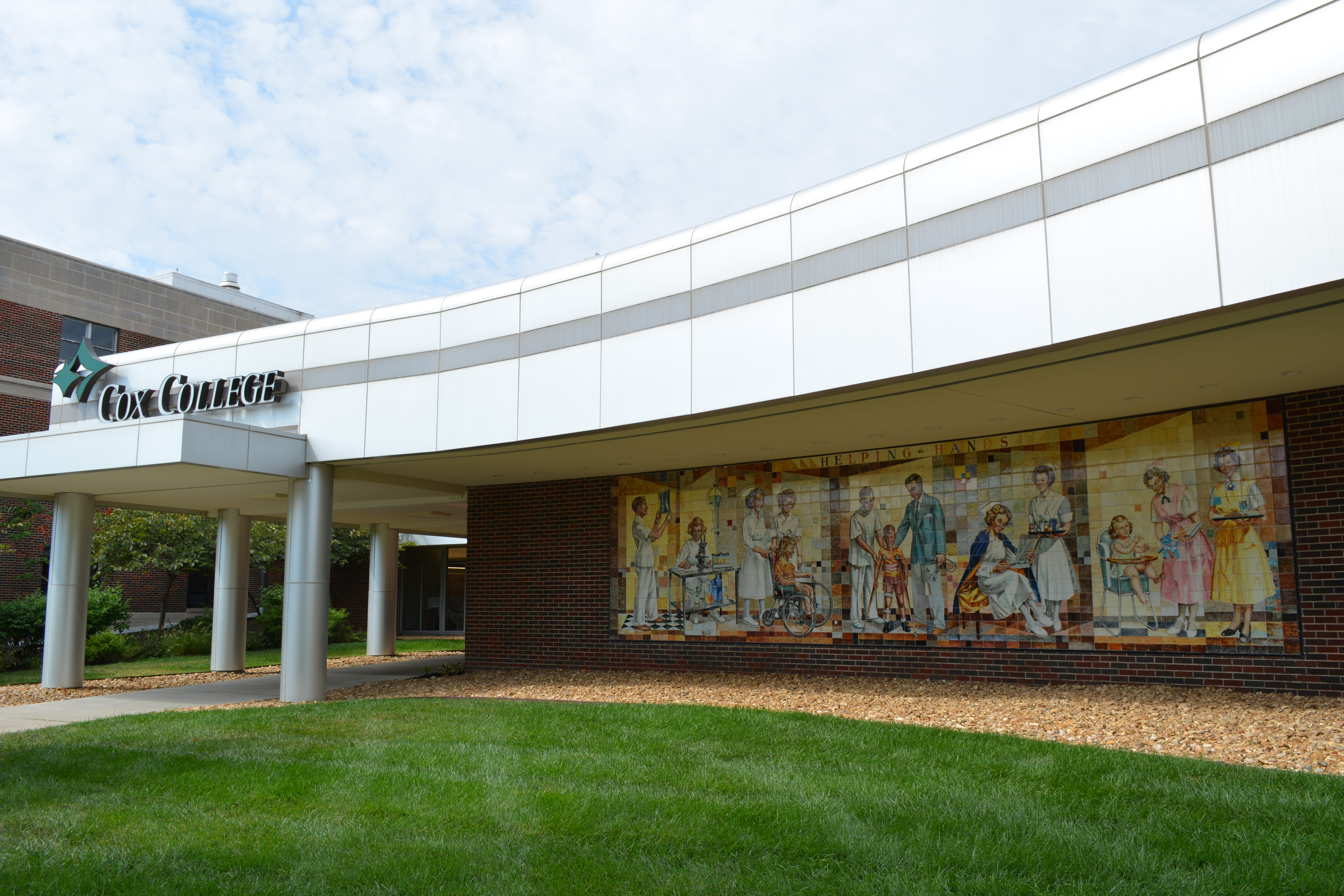
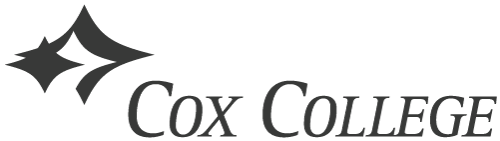
- Type: Private
- Established: 1907
- Accreditation: HLC
- Affiliations: CoxHealth
- President: Sonya Hayter
- Location: Springfield, Missouri, United States
- Website: www.coxcollege.edu

Cox College is a private college associated with the CoxHealth System in Springfield, Missouri.

== History ==
The college was established in 1907 as the Burge Deaconess Training School for Nurses. In 1996, the institution changed its name to Lester L. Cox College of Nursing & Health Sciences, and in 1997, it began offering the Bachelor of Science in Nursing (BSN) degree. The College Board of Trustees voted in July 2008 to shorten the college's name to Cox College. The CoxHealth Board of Directors reaffirmed the decision, and the change became official when the Higher Learning Commission approved it.

In anticipation of completing a $6.6 million renovation and expansion of the main campus in Springfield, the college received approval from the Missouri State Board of Nursing in 2019 to increase the size of its nursing classes from 250 to 400 students, making it the second largest nursing program in the state. In addition to expanding the main campus, Cox College also announced it would be creating satellite campuses in Branson and Monett that would offer an Associate of Science in Nursing (ASN) that would open in 2021. As of 2021, it had an enrollment of 727 undergraduate students.

In 2023, the college announced its plans to close after the spring 2025 term, with programs being moved to the Alliance for Healthcare Education, in partnership with Ozarks Technical Community College, Missouri State University, and CoxHealth. The Alliance will be designed to begin teaching students still attending high school, allow more affordable education options, and increase overall enrollment across all partners. The college later changed its closure date to 2027.

== Academics ==
The college offers the following programs:

- Associate of Science in Nursing
- Bachelor of Science in Nursing
- Master of Science in Nursing
- Master of Science in Nutrition Diagnostics
- Master of Science in Occupational Therapy
- Bachelor of Science in Diagnostic Imaging
- Associate of Science in Radiography
- Associate of Science in Medical Assisting
