= Alliance for Healthcare Education =

Nonprofit organization in Missouri

Coordinates: 37°13′30″N 93°17′24″W

- Type: Public
- Established: 2025
- Location: Springfield, Missouri, United States
- Affiliations: CoxHealth, MSU, OTC, SPS
- Website: www.alliancehce.org

The Alliance for Healthcare Education is a non-profit organization associated with the CoxHealth, Missouri State University, Ozarks Technical Community College, and Springfield Public Schools in Springfield, Missouri.

== History ==
A Collaboration between the four founding institutions, The Alliance was envisioned as a partnership to fill deficits in healthcare workforce with nursing shortages across the midwest continuing to rise. Each partner devoted their respective nursing education resources into the partnership, with CoxHealth electing to close Cox College and shifting its resources into The Alliance.

Announced in 2023 at CoxHealth's campus, Cox North, a $15 million remodel plan was set forward to house The Alliance. Shallina Goodnight was chosen as the executive director and a board of directors was formed, composed of the head position of each founding partner. With pooled resources, the mission is to increase enrollment and student success in healthcare fields which see large workforce needs in southwest Missouri and, generally, across the U.S.

Some programs are structured to allow high school juniors to enroll in The Alliance partner programs as they finish their high school years. Upon graduation, students can obtain their high school diploma, EMT or CNA certification, and up to an associate degree at no cost to the student. This approach is the first of its kind in healthcare and required a structured collaboration between all founding members.

Additional partners have joined the alliance, as affiliate partners. In July 2024, Evangel University announced their affiliate partnership followed by Burrell Behavioral Health in August 2025.

== Academics ==
The Alliance for Healthcare Education offers the following programs through its partners as of Jan 2026:

Nursing

- Associate of Science in Nursing (ASN)
- Bachelor of Science in Nursing (BSN & BSN-C)
- Master of Science in Nursing (MSN)
- Doctor of Nursing Practice (DNP)
- Practical Nursing Certificate (LPN)

Imaging Services

- Radiography Associate of Applied Science
- Diagnostic Medical Sonography Associate of Applied Science
- Computed Tomography (CT) Certificate of Specialization
- Magnetic Resonance Imaging (MRI) Certificate of Achievement
- Nuclear Medicine Certificate of Achievement
- Echocardiography (Cardiac Sonographer) Certificate of Achievement

Hospital Professions

- Paramedicine Associate of Applied Science / Certificate
- Medical Laboratory Technician Associate of Applied Science
- Respiratory Therapy Bachelor of Science and Associate of Applied Science
- Surgical Technology Associate of Applied Science
- Health Information Technology Associate of Applied Science and Certificate

Rehab Services & Preventative Care

- Master of Science in Nutrition and Dietetics (MSND)
- Physical Therapy Assistant Associate of Applied Science
- Occupational Therapy Assistant Associate of Applied Science
- Master of Occupational Therapy (MOT)
- Entry-Level Doctor of Occupational Therapy (EL-OTD)
- Post-professional Doctor of Occupational Therapy (PP-OTD)

Short-term Training

- Certified Nursing Assistant Short-Term
- Certified Medical Technician/Insulin Admin Short-Term
- Medical Assistant Short-Term Training
- IV Therapy Short-Term
- Pharmacy Technician Short-Term Training
- Phlebotomy Technician Short-term Training

Ozark Tech middle college

- General Health Sciences Track – Middle College
- CNA Training - Ozarks Tech Middle College
- EMT Training - Ozarks Tech Middle College
