= Ofo =

OFO or Ofo may refer to:

- Oslo Philharmonic, philharmonic orchestra based in Oslo, Norway
- Ufa (Öfö), capital of the Republic of Bashkortostan, Russia
- ofo (company), bike sharing company
- Mosopelea, Native American tribe
- Ofo language, indigenous language of the Mosopelea
- Ofo Uhiara (born 1975), British actor
- Office of Field Operations of the U.S. Customs and Border Protection agency
- Orbiting Frog Otolith, American satellite, launched 1970
- Ozark Festival Orchestra, Monett, Missouri, United States
- Ofo in Igboland, type of staff
