= Walter Bribeck =

American baseball player

- First baseman
- Born: August 27, 1895; Monett, Missouri, U.S.
- Died: June 7, 1944 (aged 48); Proviso, Illinois, U.S.
- Batted: Right Threw: Bribeck

Negro league baseball debut
- 1917, for the All Nations

Last appearance
- 1917, for the All Nations

Teams
- All Nations (1917)

Walter Joseph Bribeck (August 27, 1895 – June 7, 1944) was an American Negro league first baseman in the 1910s.

A native of Monett, Missouri, Bribeck played for the All Nations club in 1917. He went on to play minor league baseball into the 1920s for such teams as the Houston Buffaloes, Winston-Salem Twins, and Bloomington Bloomers. Bribeck died in Proviso, Illinois in 1944 at age 48.
