= Monett Municipal Airport =

- IATA: none; ICAO: KHFJ; FAA LID: HFJ

Summary
- Airport type: Public
- Owner: City of Monett
- Serves: Monett, Missouri
- Elevation AMSL: 1,314 ft / 401 m
- Coordinates: 36°54′22″N 094°00′46″W
- Interactive map of Monett Municipal Airport

Runways
Direction	Length		Surface
Direction	ft	m	Surface
18/36	6,001	1,829	Concrete

Statistics (2008)
- Aircraft operations: 18,100
- Based aircraft: 39
- Source: Federal Aviation Administration

Monett Municipal Airport (ICAO: KHFJ, FAA LID: HFJ, formerly M58) is a public-use airport located in Barry County, Missouri, United States. It is five nautical miles (9 km) west of the central business district of the City of Monett, which owns the airport. According to the FAA's National Plan of Integrated Airport Systems for 2009–2013, it was classified as a general aviation airport.

Although most U.S. airports use the same three-letter location identifier for the FAA and IATA, this airport is assigned HFJ by the FAA but has no designation from the IATA.

== Facilities and aircraft ==
Monett Municipal Airport covers an area of 168 acres (68 ha) at an elevation of 1,314 feet (401 m) above mean sea level. It has one runway designated 18/36 with a concrete surface measuring 6,001 by 100 feet (1,821 x 30 m).

For the 12-month period ending August 31, 2008, the airport had 18,100 aircraft operations, an average of 49 per day: 80% general aviation, 20% air taxi, and <1% military. At that time there were 39 aircraft based at this airport: 74% single-engine, 10% multi-engine and 15% jet.

== See also ==
- List of airports in Missouri
