= Jack Henry & Associates =

American financial technology company

Jack Henry
- Type: Public
- Traded as: Nasdaq: JKHY; S&P 500 component
- Founded: 1976; 50 years ago, in Monett, Missouri
- Founders: Jack Henry and Jerry Hall
- Headquarters: Monett, Missouri, U.S.
- Key people: Gregory R. Adelson (president and CEO); Mimi Carsley (CFO and treasurer); Matt Flanigan (board chair)
- Revenue: ▲US$2.54 billion (2026)
- Operating income: ▲US$635 million (2026)
- Net income: ▲US$503 million (2026)
- Total assets: ▲US$3.15 billion (2026)
- Number of employees: ~7,300 (2026)
- Website: jackhenry.com

Jack Henry & Associates, also known as Jack Henry, is an American financial technology company that provides a broad range of technology solutions and payment processing services primarily for community and regional banks and credit unions. Its offerings include core processing platforms, digital and mobile banking products, payment products, and related software and services delivered through on-premises, private-cloud, and public-cloud environments. The company serves approximately 7,200 financial institutions and other corporate entities. Jack Henry stock trades on the NASDAQ exchange under the symbol JKHY, and is a component of the S&P 500.

== History ==
Jack Henry was founded in 1976 by Jack Henry and Jerry Hall, who initially rented space in an engine repair shop for $40 a month. The company was incorporated in 1977 and generated $115,222 in revenue that year.

In 1985, an initial public offering made Jack Henry a public company trading 3,125,000 common shares on the NASDAQ exchange under the symbol JKHY.

In 1992, Jack Henry began acquiring companies to expand its product offering and client base. Three years later, the company added a core outsourcing option through an acquisition.

In 2000, Jack Henry acquired San Diego-based Symitar and became a significant provider in the credit union market.

In 2004, Jack Henry launched ProfitStars.

In 2012, Jack Henry surpassed $1 billion in annual revenue. The company crossed $2 billion in annual revenue in fiscal 2023, reporting $2.08 billion in revenue for the year ended June 30, 2023, compared with $1.94 billion in fiscal 2022.

In November 2018, S&P Dow Jones Indices announced that Jack Henry & Associates would be added to the S&P 500.

In 2021, the company was recognized by Forbes as one of America's "Best Large Employers" for the fourth time.

In 2022, Jack Henry introduced a new brand. On August 31, 2022, it acquired Payrailz, a digital payments company, for $230.2 million.

On September 30, 2025, Jack Henry acquired substantially all the assets of Victor Technologies, an embedded payments technology provider, for $42.39 million in cash.

In 2026, Jack Henry marked its 50th anniversary as a company. As of March 31, 2026, it employed approximately 7,300 full-time and part-time associates nationwide.

In 2026, Jack Henry was included in three Newsweek workplace rankings: America's Greatest Workplaces, America's Greatest Workplaces in Financial Services, and America's Greatest Workplaces by State for Missouri. The company received five-star ratings in the national and financial-services rankings and a four-and-a-half-star rating in the Missouri ranking.

=== Finance ===
The key financial trends for Jack Henry & Associates, Inc. are as follows, based on selected fiscal years:

| Year | Revenue (USD million) | Gross Profit (USD million) | Net Income (USD million) |
|---|---|---|---|
| 1994 | 38.4 | 17.9 | 6.3 |
| 2000 | 225.3 | 113.6 | 34.0 |
| 2006 | 592.2 | 256.4 | 89.9 |
| 2010 | 836.6 | 345.1 | 117.8 |
| 2014 | 1210 | 518.6 | 201.1 |
| 2018 | 1540 | 662.9 | 376.6 |
| 2020 | 1700 | 688.6 | 296.6 |
| 2024 | 2220 | 916.1 | 381.8 |
| 2025 | 2375 | 1015 | 456 |
| 2026 | 2544 | 1111 | 503 |

For fiscal 2026, GAAP revenue increased 7.1% and GAAP operating income increased 11.7% for the fiscal year ended June 30, 2026, compared to the prior fiscal year. Non-GAAP adjusted revenue increased 7.3% and non-GAAP adjusted operating income increased 11.6% for the fiscal year ended June 30, 2026, compared to the prior fiscal year.1

GAAP EPS was $6.98 per diluted share for the fiscal year ended June 30, 2026, compared to $6.24 per diluted share in the prior fiscal year representing growth of 11.9%. Cash and cash equivalents were $12.1 million at June 30, 2026, and $102.0 million at June 30, 2025.

Debt outstanding for credit facilities was $40 million at June 30, 2026, and $0 at June 30, 2025. Stock repurchases for fiscal year ended June 30, 2026, were $448 million at an average price of $152 per share.ended March 31, 2026, Jack Henry reported revenue of $636.2 million, up 8.7% from the same quarter in fiscal 2025, and net income of $122.9 million, or $1.71 per diluted share. Services and support revenue increased 10.4% to $365.1 million, while processing revenue increased 6.6% to $271.1 million.
