= Linda Bartelsmeyer =

American politician

Linda Bartelsmeyer is a former American Republican politician from Monett, Missouri, who served in the Missouri House of Representatives.

Born in Carthage, Missouri, she attended Jasper High School and Missouri Southern State College. On November 22, 1980, she married Bob Bartelsmeyer who served as a county clerk for Lawrence County, Missouri, for nearly 25 years.
