= Miracle Recreation Equipment Company =

American playground manufacturer

Miracle Recreation Equipment Company is a playground manufacturer in the United States, providing children's playground equipment and amenities for parks and schools, throughout the world.

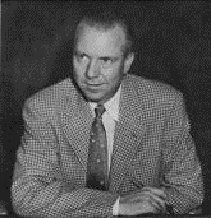
Claude Ahrens, 1954

== The beginning of Miracle ==
John Ahrens founded Miracle Recreation in Grinnell, Iowa in 1927. He redesigned the merry-go-round after seeing an exhibit for a “Perpetual Motion Machine. He called his product the “Miracle Whirl”. He was awarded a patent and created the company known as Ahrens Manufacturing Company.

John passed his company to his son Claude in 1940, who changed the company name in 1947 to the Miracle Recreation Equipment Company. Claude set up the production for the Miracle Whirl merry-go-round in the Grinnell Glove Factory. Claude redesigning it to replace the wooden platform with a more durable metal one, eliminating the center post and adding tubing handrails for the children to hold onto. Claude painted the product with a candy stripe so the product was clearly identifiable, an idea he carried through to other products as well.

Almost all of Miracle's first customers were country schools. The schools bought the Miracle Whirl to entertain their students during recess. During 1947, the firm's first year of operation, 900 whirls were sold to schools throughout Iowa. Soon after, offering were expanded to include playground equipment such as swings, teeter-totters, and jungle gyms.

== The growth of Miracle ==
After a fire in the Grinnell Glove Factory, a new facility was built on farmland purchased on the west side of Grinnell. The operation expanded rapidly and Claude hired sales managers assigned to districts and states. By 1960, Miracle had 40 district managers covering the entire country. Miracle moved into the new facility in 1963.

Miracle pioneered the use of fiberglass for slides and canopies which helped to differentiate its products from the competition; this allowed Miracle more colorful components. Miracle was the first playground manufacturer to use powder coating of steel parts in the late 1960s.

After World War II, thefirm widened their market to include the increasingly popular drive-in movie theaters, selling two smaller versions of carousels that were commonly found at fairs and amusement parks. The first year they sold over 200 carousels, which Claude Ahrens described as his “first big money in the recreation equipment business” for Miracle.

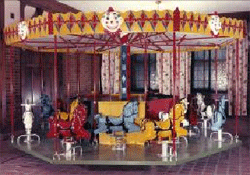
Miracle Carousel 1960

After experiencing a splinter while sitting on a wooden bleacher at a University of Iowa football game, Claude set out to create bleachers made from the fiberglass he used in many of the firm's playground items. They replaced the wooden bleachers at the university with fiberglass coverings, saving the university over $60,000. Orders came in from other large schools such as the University of Michigan and Ohio State and seating became one of the firm's most important offerings.

By 1970, the company had 200 employees selling and manufacturing playground equipment and bleachers at facilities in Iowa, California and Virginia.

== The fast food revolution ==
Miracle was the first to design and manufacture playgrounds and sets for the fast food industry. It purchased the Setmaker Company in California, and with the help of Claude's son, Paul Ahrens, creating playground designs for fast food giant McDonald's. The firm had installed play equipment at over 500 McDonald's throughout the USA. Together, Paul and Claude developed over 16 patents for their designs.

== Miracle switches hands ==
Paul Ahrens became president of Miracle in 1972, the same year the company sold 30% of its shares to the public. After facing labor struggles in the 1980s, the company began moving some operations to factories outside of Iowa. Paul announced plans in 1982 to build a new plant in Monett, Missouri.

By 1983 Paul had resigned as chair of the Miracle and turned the business over to Sharp Lannom. The decision was made to move all operations to Monett in 1986, and the plant in Grinnell was later closed. Sharp resigned later in 1986. Paul became chairman of Miracle late in 1986. Claude Ahrens had sold all of the stock in the company to his son, giving him controlling interest of the company.

In 1989 Paul died of cancer. Claude bought the firm's shares back private and took over Miracle once again. By that time, Claude was looking to sell Miracle Recreation Equipment Company and it was sold to PlayPower in 2002.

The firm holds 38 patents registered with the United States Patent and Trademark Office on its playground equipment.

== Innovations ==
- A vertical tower that offers maximum play within a small foot print.
- Spiral slides up to 12 feet high.
- Patented tensioning system for removal of stand suns shades and toppers.
- The top rated swings in all of America

== Partnership With National Center for Missing and Exploited Children ==
In October 2009 Miracle Recreation Equipment Company announced they had become a corporate sponsor of The National Center for Missing and Exploited Children (NCMEC). They pledged to donate more than $250,000 to NCMEC over three years.
