= Monett, Missouri =

City in Missouri, U.S.

- City
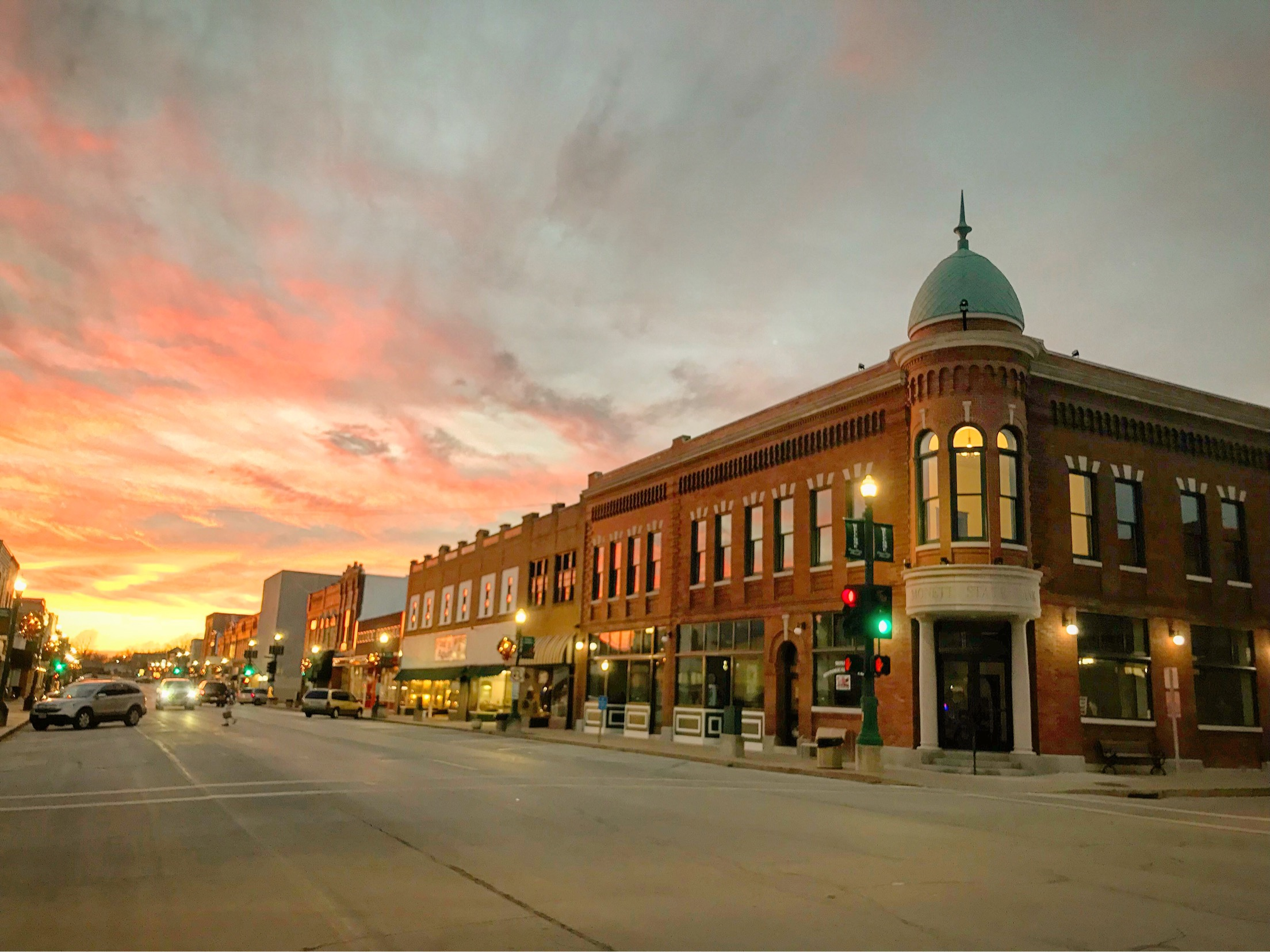
- Monett Downtown facing west

- Seal
- Motto(s): Pride & Progress
- Location of Monett, Missouri
- Coordinates: 36°55′19″N 93°55′40″W
- Country: United States
- State: Missouri
- Counties: Barry, Lawrence
- Township: Monett, Pierce
- Founded: 1870
- Incorporated: 1887

Government
  - Mayor: Randy Burke

Area
  - Total: 8.81 sq mi (22.83 km^{2})
  - Land: 8.79 sq mi (22.77 km^{2})
  - Water: 0.023 sq mi (0.06 km^{2})
- Elevation: 1,309 ft (399 m)

Population (2020)
  - Total: 9,576
  - Estimate (2025): 10,248
  - Density: 1,089.0/sq mi (420.48/km^{2})
- Demonym: Monettian
- Time zone: UTC-6 (Central (CST))
  - Summer (DST): UTC-5 (CDT)
- ZIP code: 65708
- Area code: 417
- FIPS code: 29-49196
- GNIS feature ID: 2395370
- Website: monettmo.gov

Monett (/ˈmoʊnɛt/ MOH-net) is the most-populous city in Barry and Lawrence counties in Missouri, United States. The city is located in the Ozarks, just south of Interstate 44 between Joplin and Springfield. According to the 2025 census population estimate, the town is home to an estimated 10,248 individuals.

== History ==
Southwest Missouri, including the area of what is now Monett, was inhabited by Native Americans of the Osage Nation until their forced removal to Indian Territory.

=== Settlement: 1870-1900 ===
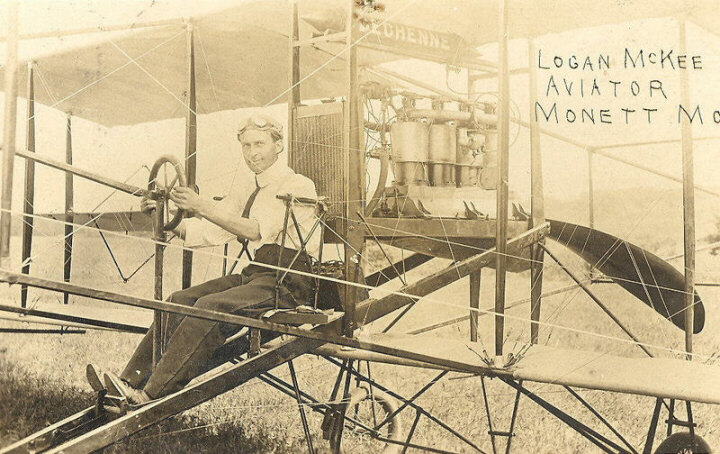
Logan McKee flying the DeChenne Aeroplane in Monett, Missouri

Monett was created as a railroad town by the St. Louis–San Francisco Railway ("Frisco Line"), which was extended into the area in 1870, and a branch line going to Paris, Texas, was built. Both lines are still in existence and operated by the BNSF Railway. During this time the area went through several names including Kings Prairie Depot, Plymouth, Plymouth Junction (when the southern branch was built in 1880), Gonten (named for the local postmaster because the Post Service said there were other Plymouths); and finally, Monett in 1887 when the area was formally platted and the Monett name was applied to the post office. It was named for Henry Monett who was a popular general station agent for various railroads including the New York, Chicago and St. Louis Railroad ("Nickel Plate Railroad") before becoming an agent for the New York Central Railroad shortly before his death at the age of 35 in 1888.

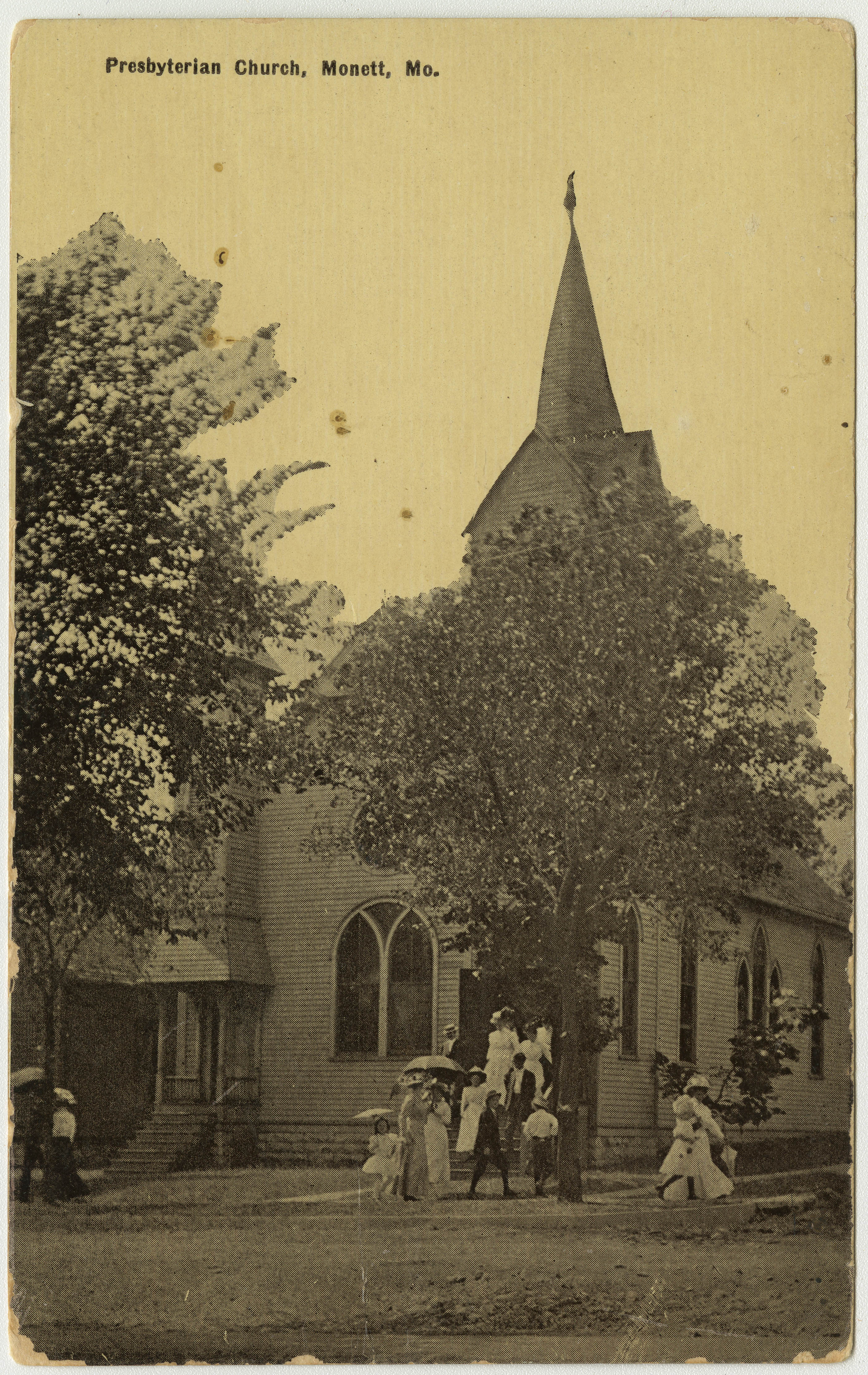
The Presbyterian Church in Monett, Missouri

The community was noted for being a rail town and had a Harvey House operating at the Frisco train station from 1896 until 1930. The community in the Ozark Mountains also had a thriving fruit business and was nicknamed the "Strawberry Capital of the Midwest." The Ozark Fruit Growers Association building, which was built in 1927, is part of the Downtown Monett Historic District and is on the National Register of Historic Places.

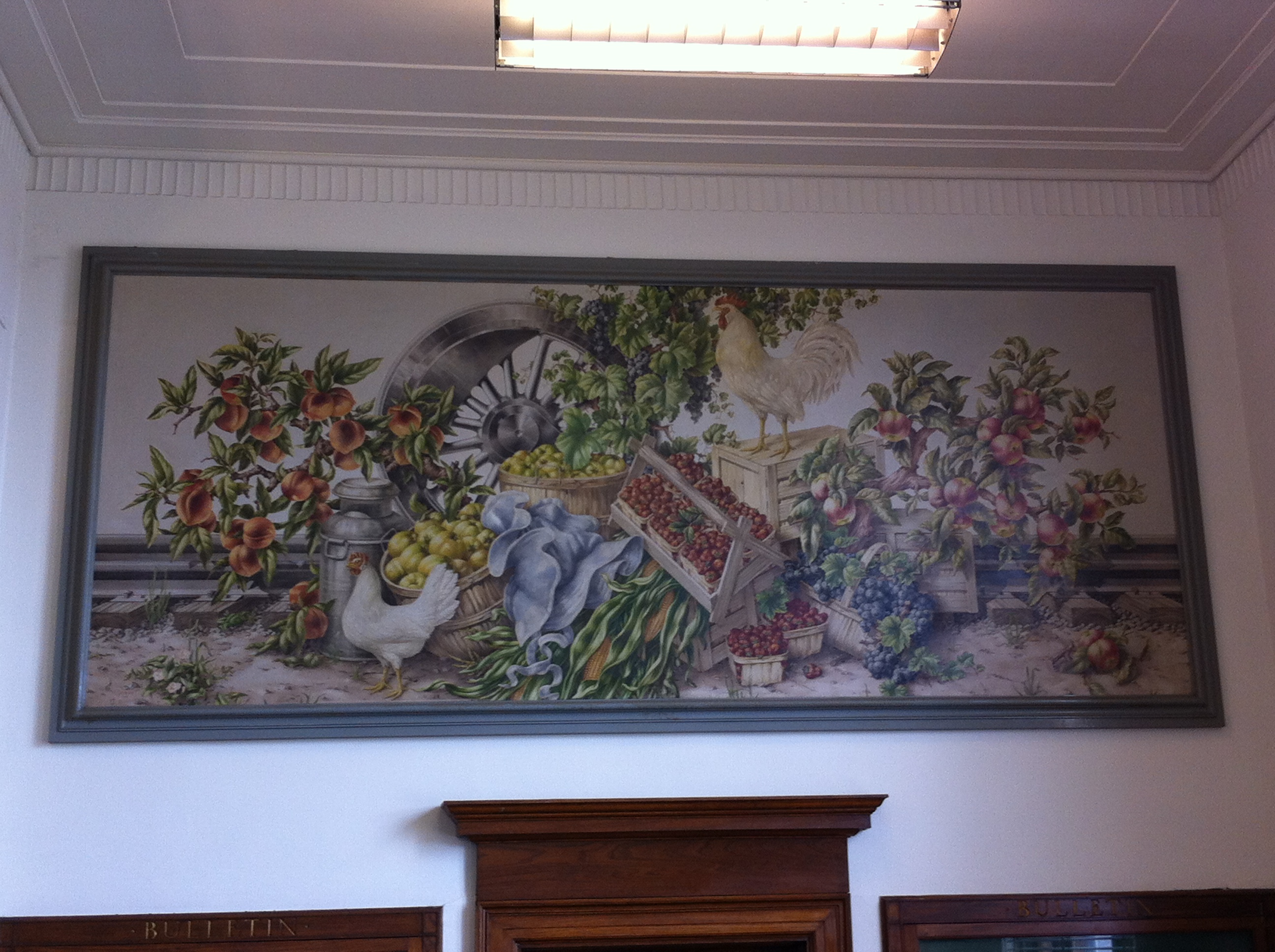
WPA mural, Products of Missouri by James McCreery, in Monett post office

The David W. Courdin House, Downtown Monett Historic District, and Waldensian Church and Cemetery of Stone Prairie are listed on the National Register of Historic Places.

In 1894, a lynching and race riot took place in Monett before the violence spread to Pierce City and other southwestern Missouri towns. Monett became a sundown town, banning African Americans from living or staying there after dark, with a sign across the main street saying: "Nigger, don't let the sun go down." A newspaper in another Missouri town reported in 1906 that "Monett, Pierce City, Rogers, Ark., and several other towns around here have driven the negros out." When Pierce City drove out its African American population in an act of ethnic cleansing, the St. Louis Post-Dispatch said the town had been "Monettized".

=== 20th century ===
From 1908 through 1911, Monett investors led by L. B. Durnil and U. S. Barnsley sought to build an airplane. Their most successful attempt was the DeChenne airplane. The DeChenne airplane gave its first public demonstration flight in Monett on July 4, 1911, flown by Monett pharmacist Logan McKee. It then made an exhibition tour in Oklahoma and Texas.

The population had reached 4,177 by 1910, due in large part to the railroad and its roundhouse. By 1937, a promotional pamphlet reported that one out of eight people in Monett worked for the railroad.

In a postwar industrialization effort, the Monett Industrial Development Corporation brought light industry to the town, further diversifying the local and broader economy. This diversification nearly doubled the population during the century, to 7,396 by 2000.

=== 21st century ===
Through a combination of private investment and public resources, numerous restoration and revitalization projects have been undertaken in the historic downtown to restore its architectural quality, upgrade the infrastructure, drive local business success, and improve the quality of life.

In 2018, Missouri Governor Eric Greitens and Senator Roy Blunt announced an "Opportunity Zone" in Monett, allocating state and federal tax incentives for businesses that invest in the areas designated. In 2018, Monett adopted the complete streets policy, the 39th city in Missouri to do so.

== Geography ==
Monett is located at 36°55′25″N 93°55′20″W (36.923725, -93.922332).

According to the United States Census Bureau, the city has a total area of 8.45 square miles (21.89 km^{2}), of which 8.43 square miles (21.83 km^{2}) is land and 0.02 square miles (0.05 km^{2}) is water.

=== Climate ===
The climate is characterized by relatively high temperatures and evenly distributed precipitation throughout the year. The Köppen Climate Classification subtype for this climate is "Cfa" (Humid Subtropical Climate).

Climate data for Monett 4SW, Missouri (1991–2020 normals, extremes 1946–present)
Month	Jan	Feb	Mar	Apr	May	Jun	Jul	Aug	Sep	Oct	Nov	Dec	Year
Record high °F (°C)	74 (23)	83 (28)	85 (29)	93 (34)	92 (33)	104 (40)	106 (41)	106 (41)	105 (41)	95 (35)	85 (29)	79 (26)	106 (41)
Mean maximum °F (°C)	66.7 (19.3)	70.7 (21.5)	77.6 (25.3)	81.9 (27.7)	86.3 (30.2)	90.7 (32.6)	95.3 (35.2)	97.1 (36.2)	91.5 (33.1)	84.0 (28.9)	75.2 (24.0)	67.7 (19.8)	98.1 (36.7)
Mean daily maximum °F (°C)	44.1 (6.7)	48.7 (9.3)	57.6 (14.2)	67.4 (19.7)	75.2 (24.0)	83.3 (28.5)	88.3 (31.3)	88.4 (31.3)	81.0 (27.2)	69.8 (21.0)	57.1 (13.9)	47.2 (8.4)	67.3 (19.6)
Daily mean °F (°C)	34.0 (1.1)	38.1 (3.4)	46.8 (8.2)	56.4 (13.6)	65.0 (18.3)	73.5 (23.1)	78.0 (25.6)	77.3 (25.2)	69.7 (20.9)	58.4 (14.7)	46.6 (8.1)	37.5 (3.1)	56.8 (13.8)
Mean daily minimum °F (°C)	23.9 (−4.5)	27.5 (−2.5)	35.9 (2.2)	45.3 (7.4)	54.8 (12.7)	63.7 (17.6)	67.7 (19.8)	66.2 (19.0)	58.4 (14.7)	47.1 (8.4)	36.2 (2.3)	27.8 (−2.3)	46.2 (7.9)
Mean minimum °F (°C)	5.3 (−14.8)	9.2 (−12.7)	16.9 (−8.4)	28.6 (−1.9)	39.3 (4.1)	52.1 (11.2)	58.2 (14.6)	56.0 (13.3)	44.6 (7.0)	30.6 (−0.8)	19.3 (−7.1)	9.8 (−12.3)	0.8 (−17.3)
Record low °F (°C)	−16 (−27)	−16 (−27)	−3 (−19)	12 (−11)	25 (−4)	41 (5)	44 (7)	43 (6)	30 (−1)	17 (−8)	4 (−16)	−17 (−27)	−17 (−27)
Average precipitation inches (mm)	2.47 (63)	2.21 (56)	3.78 (96)	4.65 (118)	6.04 (153)	4.93 (125)	4.01 (102)	3.14 (80)	4.91 (125)	3.67 (93)	3.77 (96)	2.85 (72)	46.43 (1,179)
Average snowfall inches (cm)	2.4 (6.1)	1.1 (2.8)	1.9 (4.8)	0.0 (0.0)	0.0 (0.0)	0.0 (0.0)	0.0 (0.0)	0.0 (0.0)	0.0 (0.0)	0.0 (0.0)	0.2 (0.51)	1.1 (2.8)	6.7 (17)
Average precipitation days (≥ 0.01 in)	6.7	6.8	10.0	10.1	12.2	10.2	8.7	7.5	7.4	8.5	7.9	6.7	102.7
Average snowy days (≥ 0.1 in)	1.2	0.9	0.6	0.0	0.0	0.0	0.0	0.0	0.0	0.0	0.2	1.0	3.9
Source: NOAA

== Demographics ==
Historical population
Census	Pop.	Note	%±
1890	1,699		—
1900	3,115		83.3%
1910	4,177		34.1%
1920	4,206		0.7%
1930	4,099		−2.5%
1940	4,395		7.2%
1950	4,771		8.6%
1960	5,359		12.3%
1970	5,937		10.8%
1980	6,148		3.6%
1990	6,529		6.2%
2000	7,396		13.3%
2010	8,873		20.0%
2020	9,576		7.9%
2025 (est.)	10,248		7.0%
U.S. Decennial Census

=== 2020 census ===
As of the 2020 census, Monett had a population of 9,576. The population density was 1,089.4 per square mile (420.6/km^{2}). The median age was 34.6 years. 27.9% of residents were under the age of 18 and 15.4% of residents were 65 years of age or older. For every 100 females there were 97.3 males, and for every 100 females age 18 and over there were 93.4 males age 18 and over.

97.6% of residents lived in urban areas, while 2.4% lived in rural areas.

There were 3,611 households in Monett, of which 36.6% had children under the age of 18 living in them. Of all households, 46.6% were married-couple households, 18.5% were households with a male householder and no spouse or partner present, and 26.9% were households with a female householder and no spouse or partner present. About 28.6% of all households were made up of individuals and 12.9% had someone living alone who was 65 years of age or older. The average household size was 2.8 and the average family size was 3.3.

There were 3,938 housing units, of which 8.3% were vacant. The homeowner vacancy rate was 1.9% and the rental vacancy rate was 6.2%.

Racial composition as of the 2020 census
Race	Number	Percent
White	6,588	68.8%
Black or African American	28	0.3%
American Indian and Alaska Native	191	2.0%
Asian	377	3.9%
Native Hawaiian and Other Pacific Islander	44	0.5%
Some other race	1,240	12.9%
Two or more races	1,108	11.6%
Hispanic or Latino (of any race)	2,424	25.3%

=== Income and poverty ===
The 2016–2020 5-year American Community Survey estimates show that the median household income was $39,435 (with a margin of error of +/- $4,302) and the median family income was $45,522 (+/- $7,363). Males had a median income of $30,238 (+/- $2,467) versus $22,928 (+/- $3,920) for females. The median income for those above 16 years old was $26,624 (+/- $1,764). Approximately, 11.1% of families and 17.8% of the population were below the poverty line, including 23.2% of those under the age of 18 and 8.2% of those ages 65 or over.

=== 2010 census ===
As of the census of 2010, there were 8,873 people, 3,405 households, and 2,282 families residing in the city. The population density was 1,052.6 inhabitants per square mile (406.4/km^{2}). There were 3,828 housing units at an average density of 454.1 per square mile (175.3/km^{2}). The racial makeup of the city was 86.8% White, 0.8% African American, 0.9% Native American, 1.0% Asian, 0.1% Pacific Islander, 8.5% from other races, and 1.9% from two or more races. Hispanic or Latino of any race were 19.0% of the population.

There were 3,405 households, of which 36.8% had children under the age of 18 living with them, 48.8% were married couples living together, 12.7% had a female householder with no husband present, 5.6% had a male householder with no wife present, and 33.0% were non-families. 27.9% of all households were made up of individuals, and 11.2% had someone living alone who was 65 years of age or older. The average household size was 2.57 and the average family size was 3.12.

The median age in the city was 34 years. 27.8% of residents were under the age of 18; 9% were between the ages of 18 and 24; 26.6% were from 25 to 44; 22.1% were from 45 to 64; and 14.5% were 65 years of age or older. The gender makeup of the city was 48.1% male and 51.9% female.

=== 2000 census ===
As of the census of 2000, there were 7,396 people, 2,904 households, and 1,916 families residing in the city. The population density was 1,136.2 inhabitants per square mile (438.7/km^{2}). There were 3,130 housing units at an average density of 480.8 per square mile (185.6/km^{2}). The racial makeup of the city was 89.45% White, 2.00% African American, 0.82% Native American, 0.62% Asian, 0.11% Pacific Islander, 7.82% from other races, and 0.96% from two or more races.

There were 2,904 households, out of which 32.0% had children under the age of 18 living with them, 51.2% were married couples living together, 10.7% had a female householder with no husband present, and 34.0% were non-families. 29.4% of all households were made up of individuals, and 15.1% had someone living alone who was 65 years of age or older. The average household size was 2.49 and the average family size was 3.08.

In the city the population was spread out, with 26.5% under the age of 18, 9.7% from 18 to 24, 27.3% from 25 to 44, 18.9% from 45 to 64, and 17.6% who were 65 years of age or older. The median age was 35 years. For every 100 females, there were 91.1 males. For every 100 females age 18 and over, there were 86.8 males.

The median income for a household in the city was $30,764, and the median income for a family was $36,858. Males had a median income of $26,150 versus $18,211 for females. The per capita income for the city was $17,048. About 9.2% of families and 15.0% of the population were below the poverty line, including 25.4% of those under age 18 and 7.8% of those age 65 or over.

== Economy ==
Monett's economy is based on manufacturing, financial services, software, retail, and education. This community is driven primarily by its industrial sector. Several key businesses in town include Jack Henry & Associates, CoxHealth, Tyson Foods, Miracle Recreation Equipment Company, Schreiber Foods, Hydro Aluminum, International Dehydrated Foods, Miracle, Architectural Systems Inc., EFCO, and WinTech.

The town has seen rapid growth over the last two decades. More recently, heavy investment into Monett's Historical Downtown has brought new life to many businesses, and the area's cultural scene.

Monett is a part of the Southwest Missouri Council of Governments (SMCOG), providing urban planning and economic development resources for the ten-county region around the Springfield metropolitan area, Missouri.

== Transportation ==
=== Highways ===
Monett is at the crossroads of U.S. Route 60 and Missouri Route 37, connecting the town to Interstate 44 and the metropolitan areas of Joplin, Springfield and Northwest Arkansas.

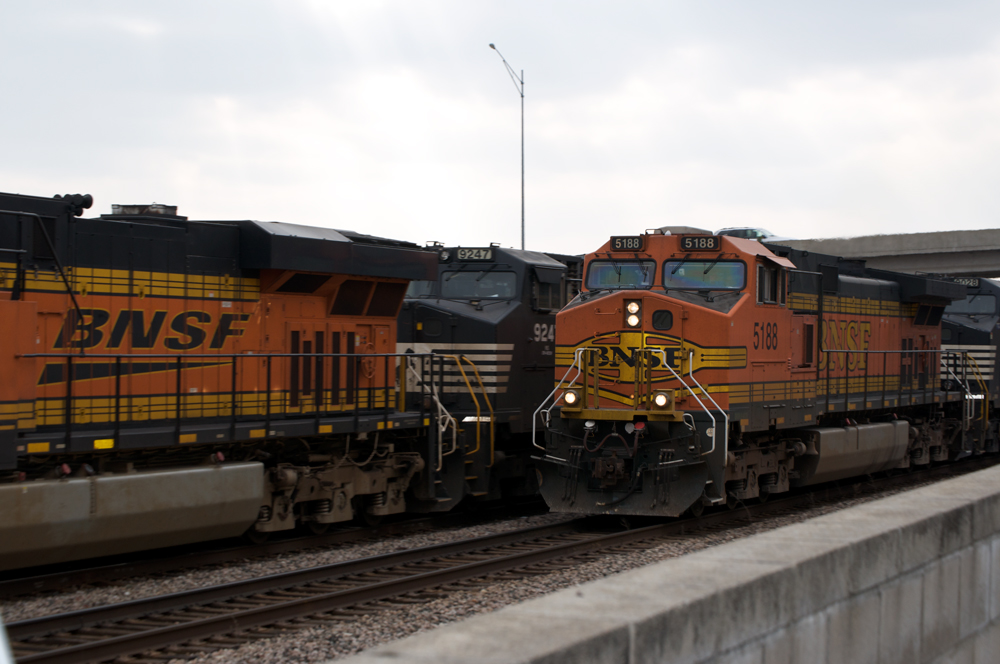
Trains meeting in Monett

=== Airport ===
The Monett Municipal Airport (HFJ) is a public-use airport, registering 18,100 aircraft operations annually in 2008. In the 2012 economic impact study conducted by the Missouri Department of Transportation, The Airport ranked 9th in the state of Missouri with a total output of 13.1 million dollars annually.

=== Railroads ===
Monett was once a thriving depot used by the St. Louis–San Francisco Railway, today it is served by the BNSF Railway and the Arkansas and Missouri Railroad.

== Education ==
=== Public ===
Monett is part of the Monett R-1 School District. The district has the following schools:

- Monett High School
- Scott Regional Technology Center
- Monett Middle School
- Monett Intermediate School
- Central Park Elementary
- Monett Elementary

Missouri Schools for the Severely Disabled (MSSD) is a state-operated program serving Missouri students with severe disabilities in the greater Monett area at:

- Oakview State School K-12

=== Private ===
The private schools in Monett include Berean Christian Academy and St. Lawrence Catholic Elementary.

=== Higher education ===
Satellite campuses for Drury University and Cox College.

=== Library ===
Monett has a public library, a branch of the Barry-Lawrence Regional Library.

== Culture ==
Southwest Missouri is a close collection of cities, towns, and communities in the heart of the Ozarks; the majority of these are located between the metropolitan areas of Joplin and Springfield and the Fayetteville-Springdale-Rogers area.

=== Entertainment and performing arts ===
- The Ozark Festival Orchestra is an independent and established orchestra residing in Monett for over 45 years. Performing various shows annually, their songs feature great works of classical, baroque, romantic, pop, and patriotic music.
- Performing Arts Center (PAC) hosts performances by the Community Theatre, Ozark Festival Orchestra, and productions put on by Monett High School.
- Starting in 2018, on the first Friday of each month from May to August, the town holds the "First on Front", on Front Street and Broadway; this remains a festival with live music, food trucks, and a beer garden.

=== Sports ===
- From 1936 to 1939, the Monett Red Birds played in the Arkansas-Missouri League, as a minor league affiliate of the St. Louis Cardinals.
- Since 1968, the Monett Cubs football, men's and women's soccer, and men's and women's track & field, have competed at Burl Fowler Stadium
- As a program, in 2018, the Monett High School Football team was inducted into the Missouri Sports Hall of Fame, for being one of the most successful football programs in state history, from 1927 to the present day. The program has won three state championships in 1971, 1977, and 2016; this is in addition to 12 conference championships and 13 district titles since the state implemented a structured post-season.

== Hospitals ==
Cox Monett Hospital, part of CoxHealth, built in 2021

== Notable people ==
- Linda Bartelsmeyer - Former member of the Missouri House of Representatives, 132nd district
- Walter Bribeck - American Negro League First Baseman
- Amber Cox - Chief Operation Officer & General Manager of the Indiana Fever
- Ed Negre - Former NASCAR Cup Series driver and team owner
- Ginny Duenkel - (Ginny Fuldner) 1964 Olympic gold medalist and former Olympic record-holding swimmer
- Erv Dusak - MLB baseball player, started career with Monett Red Birds
- Jack Henry - founder of Jack Henry & Associates, S&P 500 financial services company headquartered in Monett
- James B. Kring - University of Massachusetts & University of Florida entomology professor
- Ben Mauk - Wake Forest & University of Cincinnati QB (2003-2007), Monett High School Head Coach
- Heinie Mueller - (Clarence Francis "Heinie" Mueller) MLB Baseball player, manager of the Monett Red Birds
- Phil Mulkey - Track and Field athlete
- Gary Nodler - Missouri State Senator, 32nd District, Former Executive Director of the Monett Chamber of Commerce
- Sally Shelton-Colby - U.S. Ambassador to Barbados, Grenada and Dominica
- Howard F. Stone - Lieutenant General in the U.S. Army
- Titanic Thompson - (Alvin Clarence Thomas), gambler, golfer and hustler

== See also ==
- List of cities in Missouri
- List of sundown towns in the United States
