= David W. Courdin House =

Historic house in Monett, Missouri

- U.S. National Register of Historic Places
- U.S. Historic district
- Location within Missouri Location within the United States
- Location: 2.4 miles SE of Monett, near Monett, Missouri
- Coordinates: 36°54′01″N 93°54′26″W
- Area: 19 acres (7.7 ha)
- Built: 1876
- NRHP reference No.: 71000460
- Added to NRHP: November 5, 1971

David W. Courdin House, also known as the Old Courdin House, is a historic home and national historic district located near Monett, Barry County, Missouri. It was built in 1876, and is a grouping of house and farm buildings associated with the Waldensian community. They include the one-story, gable roofed stone dwelling, a usable cistern, well and vegetable cellar, the ruins of the original dairy barn and smokehouse.

It was added to the National Register of Historic Places in 1971.
