= Ozark Festival Orchestra =

The Ozark Festival Orchestra is an independent, self-sustaining, established orchestra residing in a small city in the Ozarks --- Monett, Missouri, population 9,576. The ensemble of 40 members commissions new works, features regional and national guest soloists, and hosts a Young Artists competition annually. It is uncommon for an American city of this size to host an orchestra, although many small American towns do have a community band.

The OFO has a five-concert season starting in October and ending in April or May.

The OFO completed its 38th season in the spring of 2018; this was the 4th season for the current conductor/musical director, Todd Borgmann. Former musical directors include Ken Meisinger, Jordan Tang and David Goza.
