= Downtown Monett Historic District =

Historic district in Missouri, United States

- U.S. National Register of Historic Places
- U.S. Historic district
- Location within Missouri Location within the United States
- Location: Parts of the 200-400 blocks of Broadway & Bond, Monett, Missouri
- Coordinates: 36°55′16″N 93°55′28″W
- Area: 10.91 acres (4.42 ha)
- Built: 1892
- Built by: Gillioz, M. E.
- Architect: Hawkins, Earl; Melick, Neal A.; Simon, Louis A.
- Architectural style: Classical Revival, Moderne
- NRHP reference No.: 14000373
- Added to NRHP: June 27, 2014

Downtown Monett Historic District is a national historic district located at Monett, Barry County, Missouri. It encompasses 35 contributing buildings in the central business district of Monett. The district developed between about 1892 and 1947, and includes representative examples of Classical Revival and Streamline Moderne architecture. Notable buildings include the Ozark Fruit Growers Association (1926), Armstrong and Sons Grocers (1914), Wilson Opera House (1893), Zumwalt Lunch Stand (1928), Callaway Furniture Store (1916), Hoberg Building (1893), First National Bank (c. 1900), Main Variety (1945), Bill Martin's Chevrolet (c. 1940), Monett State Bank (c. 1903), City Hall and Fire Station (c. 1929), Gas Service Company and Battery Factory (1917), Post Office (1936), and Masonic Temple (1922).

It was added to the National Register of Historic Places in 2014.
