= Waldensian Church and Cemetery of Stone Prairie =

Historic church in Missouri, United States

- U.S. National Register of Historic Places
- Location within Missouri Location within the United States
- Location: Rt. 2, near Monett, Missouri
- Coordinates: 36°53′48″N 93°55′07″W
- Area: 2 acres (0.81 ha)
- Built: 1908
- NRHP reference No.: 85000100
- Added to NRHP: January 18, 1985

Waldensian Church and Cemetery of Stone Prairie (The Waldensian Presbyterian Church and Cemetery) is a historic Waldensian church located near Monett, Barry County, Missouri.

== History ==
In 1875, the Monett congregation was among the first Waldensian congregations to be established in the United States by some 40 settlers, including a few who had formed the first Waldensian settlement in South America in Uruguay in the 1850s. Led by the Waldensian minister Jean Pierre Michelin Salomon, a native of the Pellice Valley of northwestern Italy, this contingent left South America in early 1875, fleeing civil war in the Uruguayan countryside, traveling first back to Europe then across the Northern Atlantic to New York and by train to southern Missouri. The original congregation was composed mainly of patois-speaking Piedmontese immigrants. Waldensians living in the Cottian Alps region of Northern Italy continued to migrate to Monett until the early 1900s. The original colony was augmented by French-speaking Protestants who arrived from France and Switzerland. Both the Monett congregation and a more recent, larger settlement located in Valdese, North Carolina, use the name Waldensian Presbyterian Church. The original frame meeting house in Monett was constructed in 1875 and was replaced in 1908 by the current church building. There is an adjacent Waldensian cemetery.

The site was added to the National Register of Historic Places in 1985.
