= CoxHealth =

US healthcare system

Coordinates: 37°13′29″N 93°17′24″W

- Type: Non-profit organization
- Industry: Health care
- Founded: Springfield, Missouri, United States (1906)
- Founder: Ellen Burge
- Headquarters: Springfield, Missouri, United States
- Area served: North America
- Key people: President & CEO Max Buetow
- Owner: Private 501c3 not-for-profit
- Number of employees: 14,000
- Website: www.coxhealth.com

CoxHealth is a six-hospital, 1,074 bed not-for-profit healthcare system headquartered in Springfield, Missouri. It serves a 25 county region of Southwest Missouri and Northwest Arkansas. CoxHealth is Springfield's largest employer, and the 9th largest non-governmental employer in the state of Missouri, with more than 14,000 people employed throughout the system.

== History ==
CoxHealth started on Thanksgiving Day, in 1906, when Ellen Burge, the widow of a prominent Springfield business man, donated her frame duplex on Jefferson Avenue to be used as a Methodist hospital. It had 18 rooms, 12 of which were furnished for patients. It was named Burge Deaconess Hospital in her honor. The Burge Hospital grew due to the great need for expert healthcare in Southwest Missouri. In 1948, a Springfield businessman, Lester E. Cox, was asked to save the hospital from near bankruptcy. He led a series of capital campaigns for hospital expansion. He was very involved with the hospital's success as the volunteer board chairman. In 1968, Cox died, and the hospital changed its name from Burge-Protestant Hospital to Lester E. Cox Medical Center in his honor. Former Presidents include Steve Edwards, Neil Wortley, Charlie Edwards, Larry Wallis, and Robert Bezanson. In 1993, Lester E. Cox Medical Centers became Cox Health Systems. The Board voted to change it to CoxHealth in June 2002.

== Facilities ==
=== Cox South ===
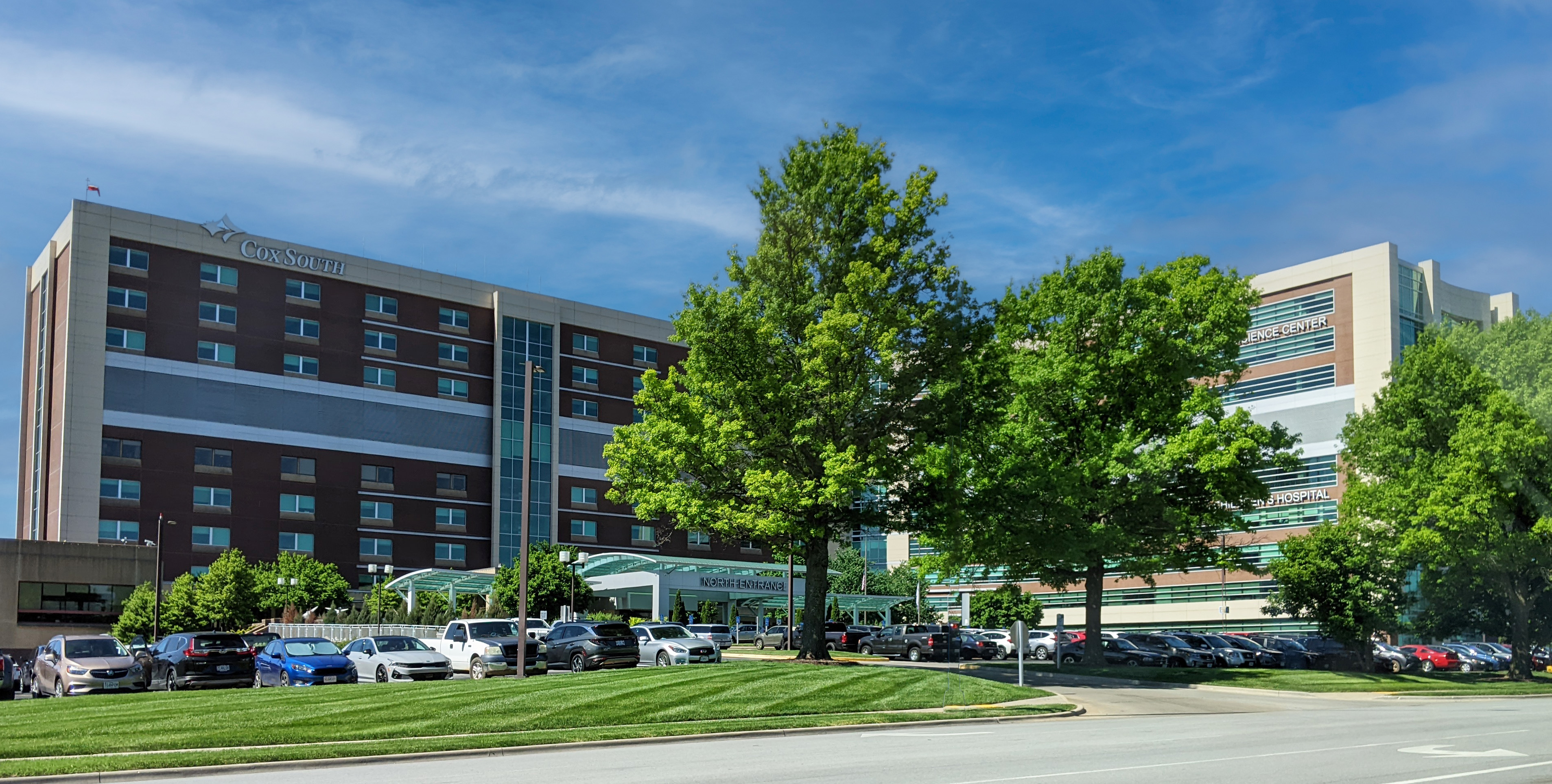
CoxHealth South

Cox Medical Center South is the largest facility and main campus operated by CoxHealth. Construction started in 1981, and the ten story Cox South hospital was completed in 1985. The full-service hospital features 706 beds and houses the main service lines of the system. It includes a Level 1 Trauma Center, Level 1 STEMI Center, and Level 1 Stroke Center. The Hulston Cancer Center and Wheeler Heart and Vascular Center are connected to the main Cox South hospital via the "Skywalk" enclosed walkway over National Avenue. The Turner Center is a women and children specialty outpatient center connected to Cox South. The Jared Neuroscience Center and The Dee Ann White Women's and Children's hospital are featured in the newest 10 story tower on the campus.

In 2010, Cox South opened a new emergency department, and in 2012, it was designated a Level I Trauma Center. CoxHealth has over 160,000 emergency, urgent care, and trauma visits each year. In June 2007, CoxHealth purchased a new MD Helicopters MD Explorer 902 for $5.1 million. The new helicopter replaces the smaller 1989 Messerschmitt MBB Bo 105LS air ambulance. The new helicopter has a top speed of 160 m.p.h. and includes a quieter design and improved safety because of the lack of a tail rotor. Cox Air Care was one of the first, in the state of Missouri, to fly with night vision goggles and the only one in the state to fly with blood on board.

The Martin Center is a free standing diagnostic and imaging center. The four story facility houses X-ray, Fluoroscopy, MRI (including 3 Tesla), CT, Endoscopy Services (colonoscopy and EGD procedures), nuclear medicine, PET, and Ultrasound equipment all under one roof.

Burrell Behavioral Health and CoxHealth have partnered together to supply outpatient child and adult mental health services. They are located on the Cox South Campus next to Burrell Park.

A Ronald McDonald House is located on the Cox South campus to provide a low cost and friendly living area for those with children in the hospital.

=== Cox North ===
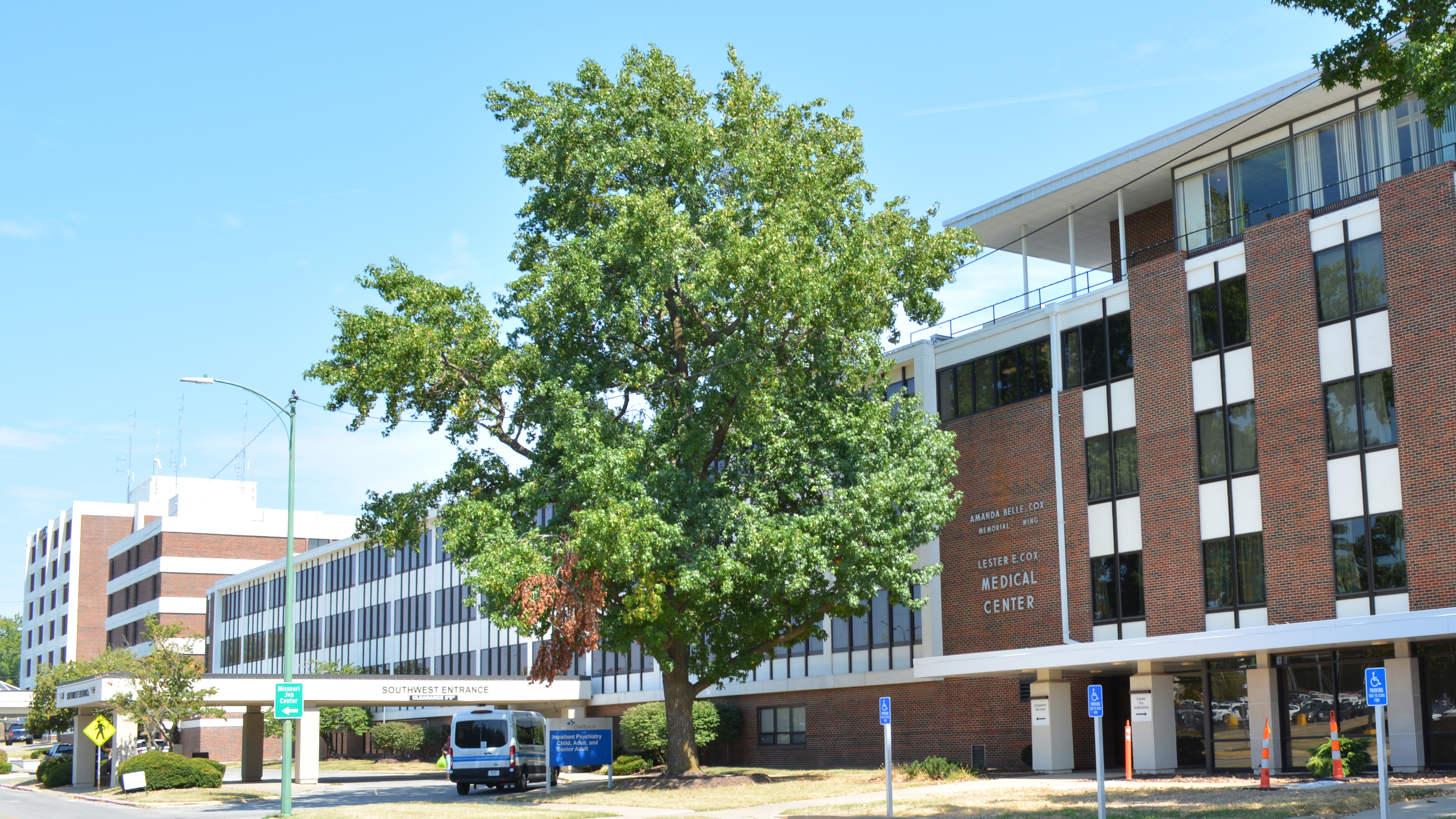
Cox North in Springfield, MO (ca. 2025)

Cox North is the site of the original Burge Hospital, which opened in 1906 and eventually became CoxHealth. Cox North currently features 75 beds. This includes a 40,000 visit emergency room and CoxHealth's inpatient behavioral health units. They also provide outpatient services, CT, US, X-rays and Labs; as well as physical therapy.

=== Meyer Orthopedic and Surgical Hospital ===
Meyer Orthopedic and Surgical Hospital is located just north of the main Cox South campus, and is a specifically designed orthopedic specialty hospital to house all of CoxHealth's orthopedic procedures. The new hospital features 35 private orthopedic patient rooms, 15 in-patient rehabilitation rooms, and 35 transitional care rooms. All operating rooms will be constructed to orthopedic-specific specifications.

=== Cox Medical Center Branson ===
In 2013, Skaggs Regional Medical Center in Branson became a part of CoxHealth and was renamed Cox Medical Center Branson. It is a 157-bed hospital chiefly serving Stone and Taney County Missouri.

=== Cox Health Plans ===
Cox Health Plans is an affiliate of CoxHealth that provides insurance for nearly 45,000 members across Missouri and throughout the nation. Starting in 1995, Cox HealthPlans is composed of teams in Medical Management, Claims Processing, Member Services, Finance, Underwriting, Information Technology, and Marketing. The Institute for Health and Productivity Management (IHPM) announced, in February 2010, that Cox HealthPlans was selected to receive a 2009 Value-Based Health Award for small employer. Cox HealthPlans was recognized for demonstrating leadership and innovation in value health management, in support with work done with the employers of Southwest Area Manufacturers Association health benefit design. Cox HealthPlans received the 2011 Trizetto IHM Power Award in the category of Operational Excellence.

=== Meyer Center for Wellness and Rehabilitation ===
The Meyer Center for Wellness and Rehabilitation is a medical facility that directly connected to the Meyer Orthopedic and Surgical Hospital. The Meyer Center offers a work-out facility, pools, and a gym to patients and to the public.

=== Bone and Joint Center ===
The Bone and Joint Center is connected to the Meyer Center via an overhead enclosed walkway. This center offers sports medicine services, orthopedic physician offices, plastic surgery office, and imaging services.

=== CoxHealth Surgery Center ===
The CoxHealth Surgery Center is dedicated to non-orthopedic surgeries. The two story facility is also the main location for ear, nose, and throat procedures.

=== Cox Monett ===
Cox Monett is a community hospital in Monett, Missouri. CoxHealth Monett features an emergency department, 25-bed inpatient unit, radiology and laboratory, and is attached to the outpatient clinic. It serves the counties to the southwest of Springfield. A new facility was opened in January 2021.

=== Cox Barton County ===
Cox Barton County-is a 25-bed critical access hospital operating in Lamar, Missouri, and joined the system in 2018.

=== Other facilities ===
CoxHealth operates a number of clinics and facilities throughout southwest Missouri. There are over 100 clinics that consist of Primary Care Clinics, Walk-in Clinics, an Orthopedic and Sports Injury Walk-in Clinic, as well as multiple Urgent Care locations including one in Springfield, The Turner Center, that is operated 24 hours per day, 365 days a year. The CoxHealth Family Medicine Residency Teaching Program is housed in Wheeler Heart and Vascular Center and has over 30,000 clinic visits each year.

== Developments ==
=== St. Louis Children's at CoxHealth ===
In 2026, CoxHealth expanded its network of partnerships and facilities. St. Louis Children’s at CoxHealth, a joint venture with WashU Medicine and BJC Health, opened an independently licensed pediatric hospital on the Cox Medical Center South campus on March 1, 2026 — described as the only independently licensed, full-service pediatric hospital in southwest Missouri, with an advanced neonatal intensive care unit and pediatric intensive care unit. A related 133,000-square-foot Specialty Care Center is planned to open in summer 2027. CoxHealth also partnered with Select Medical to open a new inpatient rehabilitation hospital in Ozark, Missouri, and transitioned its electronic health record system to Epic, introducing the MyChart patient portal. In August 2026, CoxHealth announced a partnership with Oscar Health connecting ACA Marketplace coverage to its network of hospitals and physicians.

=== CoxHealth Rehabilitation Hospital ===
In 2024, CoxHealth announced a joint venture with Select Medical, one of the nation's largest post-acute care providers, to build and operate a new inpatient rehabilitation hospital in Ozark, Missouri. The 70,000-square-foot, 63-bed facility, built at a cost of roughly $30 million, opened on February 3, 2026. It consolidated inpatient rehabilitation care previously spread across Meyer Orthopedic and Rehabilitation Hospital, the acute rehabilitation unit at Cox Medical Center Branson, and the Select Specialty Hospital–Springfield acute rehab unit into a single location, treating conditions such as stroke, brain and spinal cord injuries, amputations, and orthopedic conditions.

=== The Alliance ===
In 2023, CoxHealth partnered with Missouri State University, Ozarks Technical Community College, and Springfield Public Schools to launch the Alliance for Healthcare Education, a collaborative initiative to grow the region’s health care workforce.

== Community impact ==
CoxHealth provides over $100,000,000 of charity care to the community per year for uncompensated medical care. CoxHealth has been recognized for their economic impact and charitable work in the southwest Missouri area.

Children's Miracle Network Hospitals of CoxHealth is a non-profit organization that raises and provides resources to assist in the medical care of children under the age of 18. CMN Hospitals at CoxHealth have raised more than $52 million since its inception in 1986. In 2024, the organization had a record year with revenues coming in above $3.1 million, an increase of about $589,000, or 23%, over 2023.
