= List of cities in Missouri =

A map of the United States with the state of Missouri highlighted

Missouri is a state located in the Midwestern United States. As of the 2020 census, 6,154,913 (98.12%) of the 6,270,541 residents of Missouri lived in a municipality in the 2025 estimate.

Missouri is the 18th-most populous state and 18th-largest by land area, spanning 68,746.339 square miles (178,052.20 km^{2}) of land. Missouri is divided into 115 counties and contains 936 municipalities consisting of cities.

== City requirements ==
In Missouri, cities are classified into three types: 3rd Class, 4th Class, and those under constitutional charters. A few older cities are incorporated under legislative charters (Carrollton, Chillicothe, LaGrange, Liberty, Miami, Missouri City, and Pleasant Hill) which are no longer allowed. (Carthage is also a Charter City and Charter Cities are by constitution not legislation and are still allowed to this day). The level at which they incorporate is determined by their population when they incorporate. They do not change if they gain or lose in population, unless a vote is held by the people.

Cities under constitutional charters may operate under any form of municipal government if it is enacted in the city's charter.

- Home Rule class: Cities with more than 5,000 inhabitants
- Third class: Municipalities with a population between 3,000 and 29,999
- Fourth class: Municipalities with a population between 500 and 2,999
- Village class: Municipalities with less than 500 inhabitants

== Municipalities ==
Notable incorporated cities in Missouri

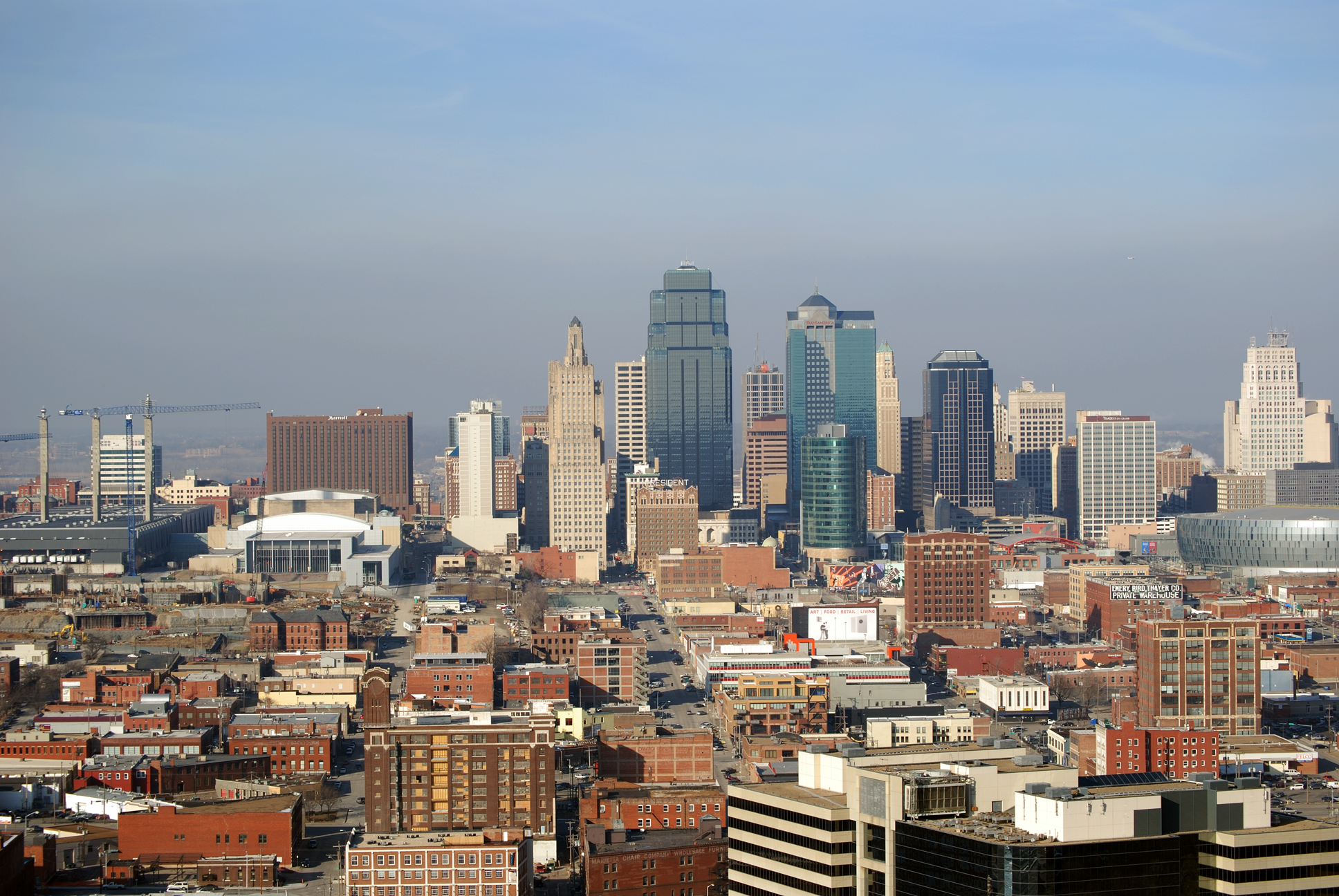
Kansas City, largest city in Missouri

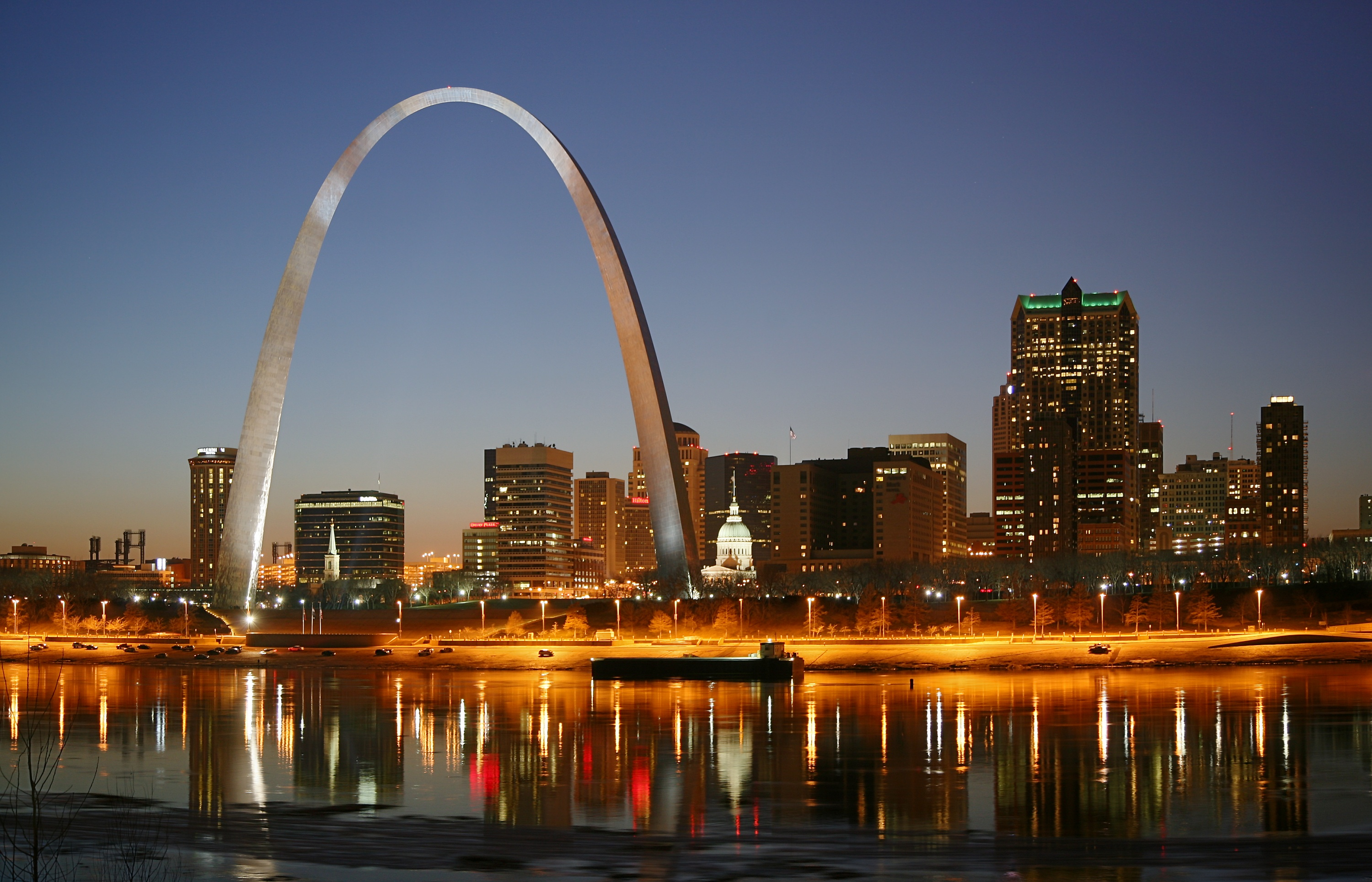
St. Louis, second-largest city

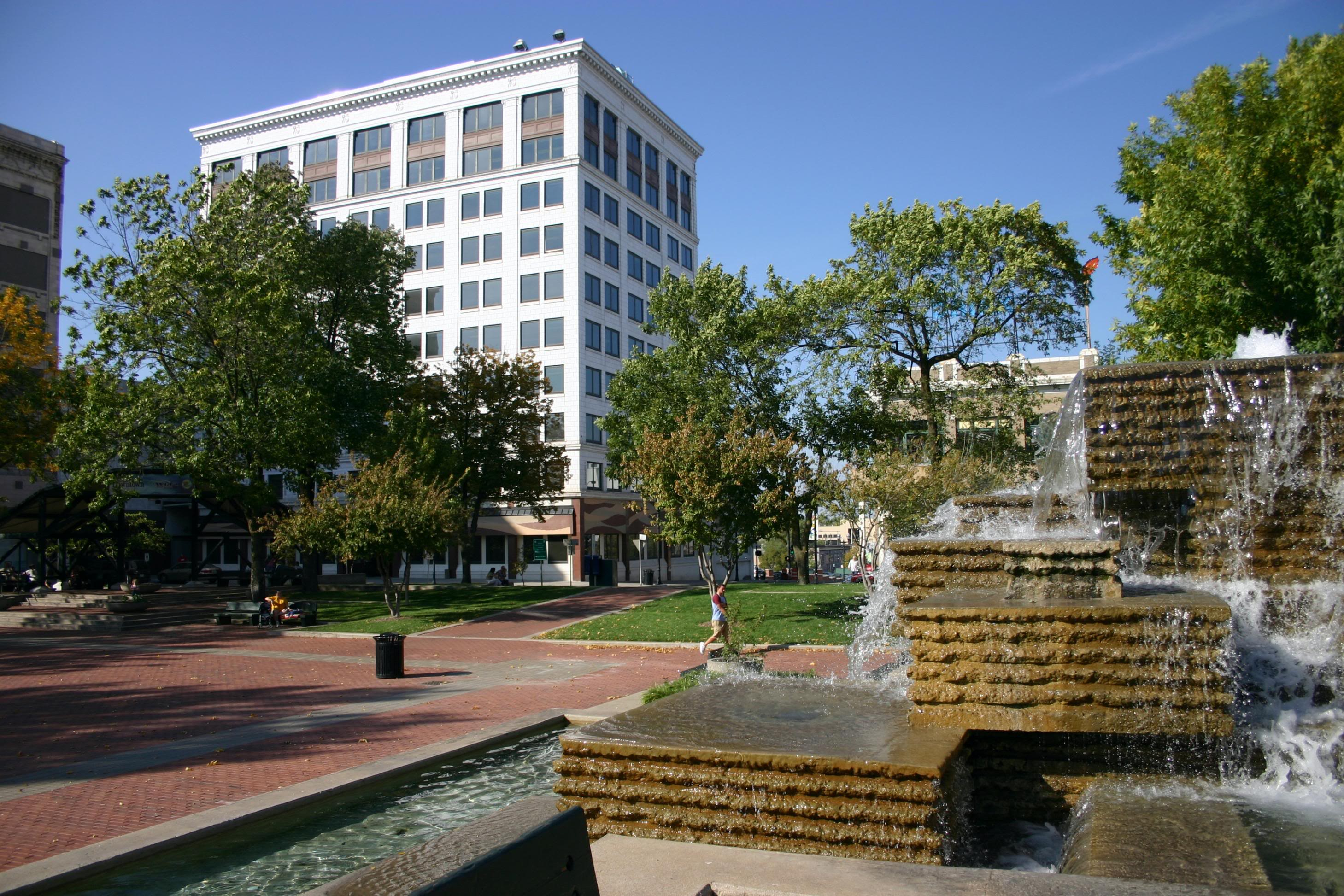
Springfield, third-largest city

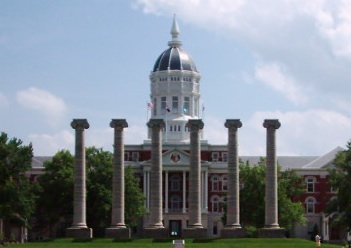
Columbia, fourth-largest city

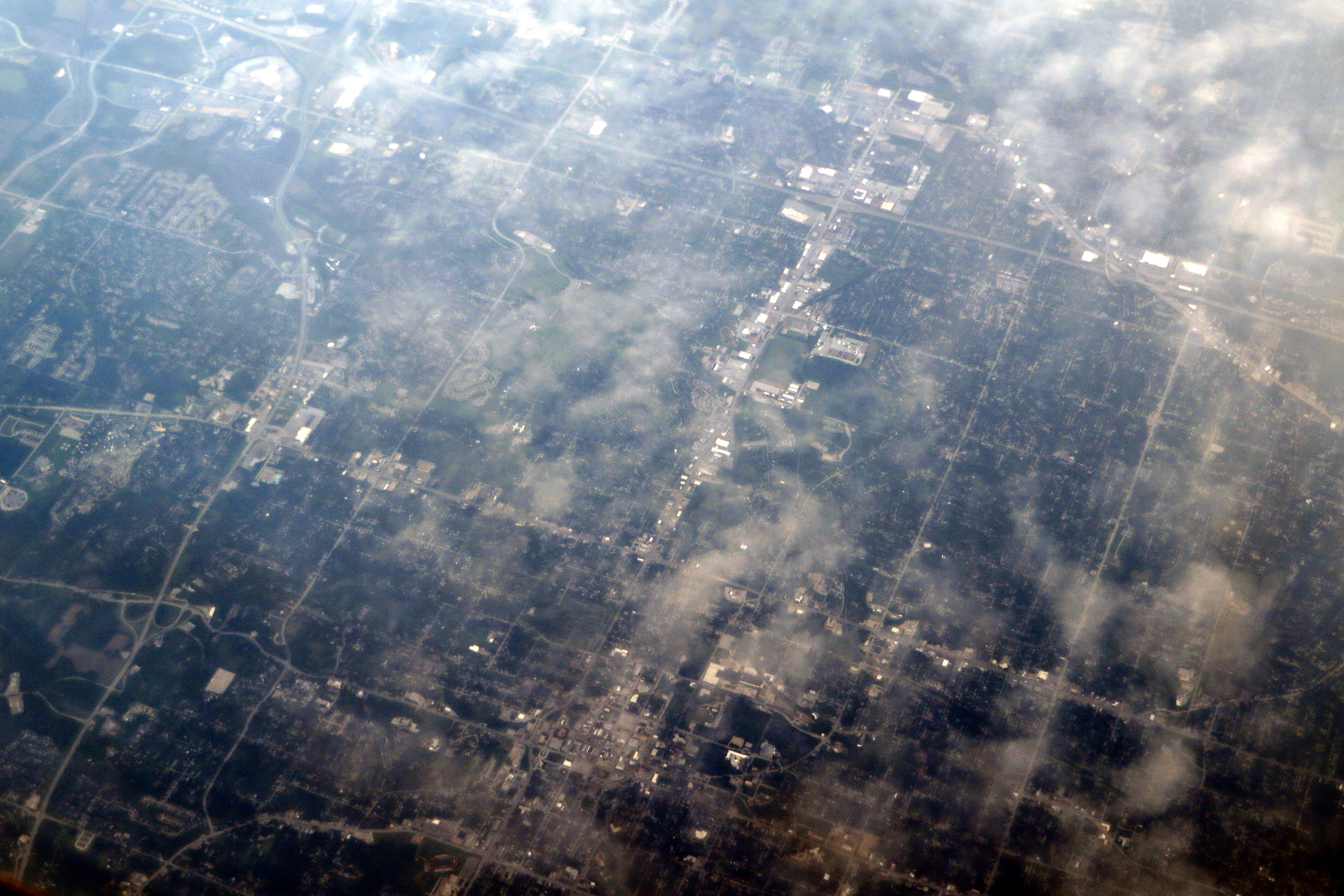
Independence, a satellite city of Kansas City and the fifth-largest city

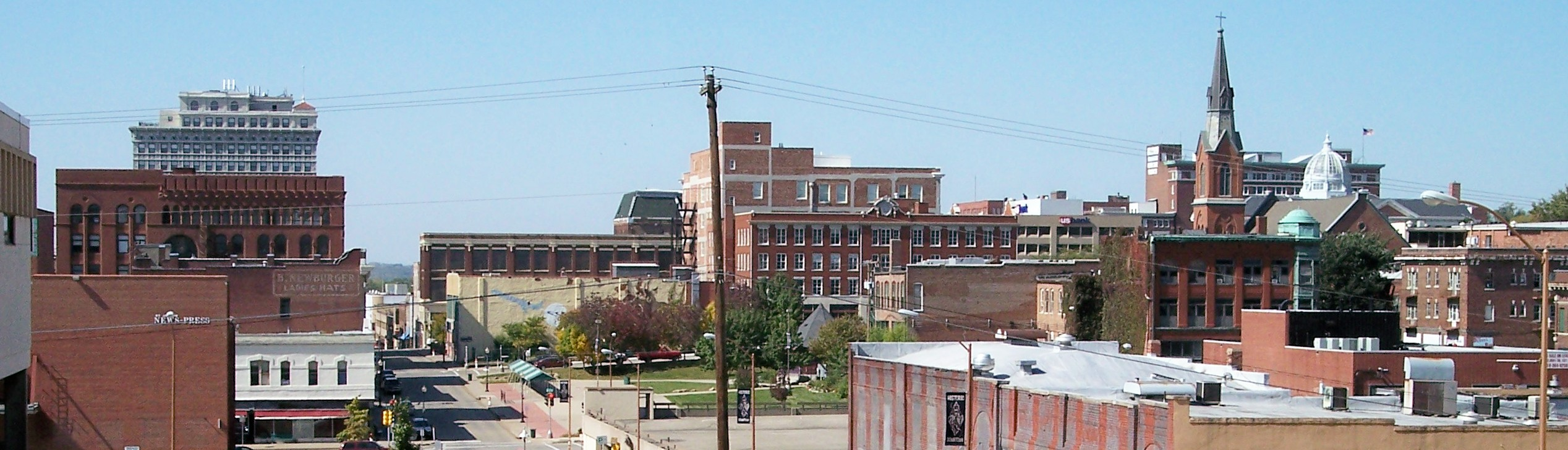
St. Joseph

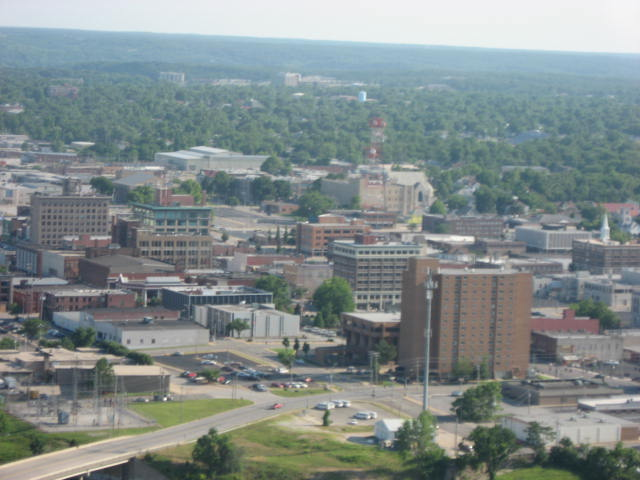
Joplin

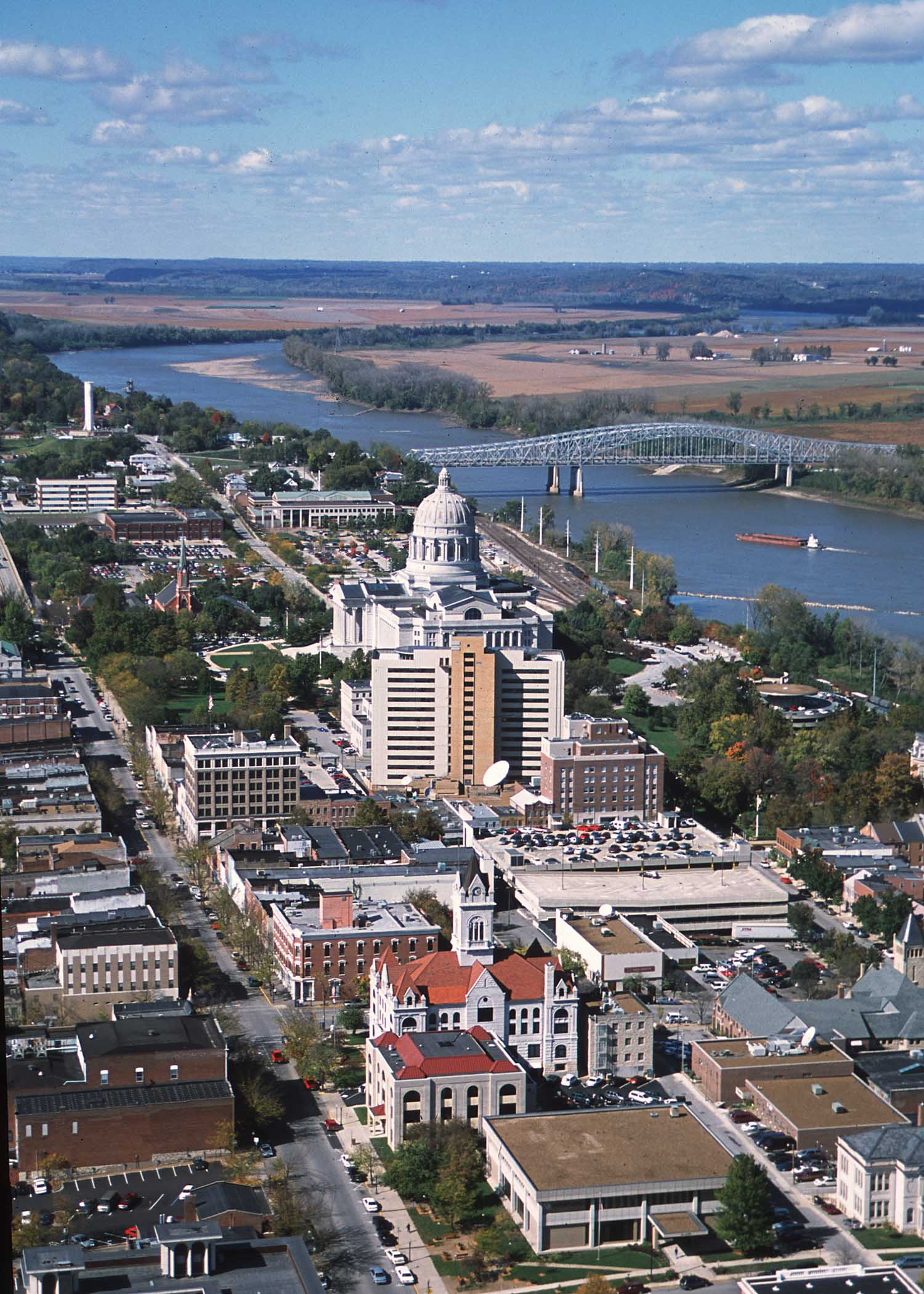
Jefferson City, state capital and sixteenth-largest city

As of May 2026, the 936 Missouri municipalities include 643 cities, 104 towns, and 189 villages.

County seat
State capital and county seat

2025 rank	Municipality	Designation	Primary county	Secondary county(ies)	Population		
2025 rank	Municipality	Designation	Primary county	Secondary county(ies)	2025 Estimate	2020 census	2020–2025 Change
1	Kansas City	City	Jackson	Clay, Platte, Cass	521,220	508,090	+2.58%
2	St. Louis	City	none (independent city)		278,144	301,578	−7.77%
3	Springfield	City	Greene	Christian	169,847	169,176	+0.40%
4	Columbia	City	Boone		130,851	126,254	+3.64%
5	Independence	City	Jackson	Clay	121,675	123,011	−1.09%
6	Lee's Summit	City	Jackson	Cass	107,514	101,108	+6.34%
7	O'Fallon	City	St. Charles		96,101	91,316	+5.24%
8	St. Charles	City	St. Charles		72,561	70,493	+2.93%
9	St. Joseph	City	Buchanan		71,001	72,473	−2.03%
10	Blue Springs	City	Jackson		61,632	58,603	+5.17%
11	St. Peters	City	St. Charles		61,479	57,732	+6.49%
12	Joplin	City	Jasper	Newton	53,930	51,762	+4.19%
13	Florissant	City	St. Louis		51,124	52,533	−2.68%
14	Wentzville	City	St. Charles		49,495	44,372	+11.55%
15	Chesterfield	City	St. Louis		49,309	49,999	−1.38%
16	Jefferson City	City	Cole	Callaway	42,489	43,228	−1.71%
17	Cape Girardeau	City	Cape Girardeau	Scott	40,977	39,540	+3.63%
18	Wildwood	City	St. Louis		34,955	35,417	−1.30%
19	University City	City	St. Louis		34,657	35,065	−1.16%
20	Liberty	City	Clay		31,319	30,167	+3.82%
21	Ballwin	City	St. Louis		30,901	31,103	−0.65%
22	Kirkwood	City	St. Louis		29,331	29,461	−0.44%
23	Raytown	City	Jackson		29,154	30,012	−2.86%
24	Maryland Heights	City	St. Louis		27,559	28,284	−2.56%
25	Gladstone	City	Clay		27,497	27,063	+1.60%
26	Grandview	City	Jackson		26,653	26,209	+1.69%
27	Raymore	City	Cass		26,633	22,941	+16.09%
28	Nixa	City	Christian		26,597	23,257	+14.36%
29	Belton	City	Cass		26,193	23,953	+9.35%
30	Hazelwood	City	St. Louis		24,849	25,548	−2.74%
31	Ozark	City	Christian		23,544	21,284	+10.62%
32	Webster Groves	City	St. Louis		23,450	24,010	−2.33%
33	Sedalia	City	Pettis		22,621	21,725	+4.12%
34	Republic	City	Greene	Christian	22,404	18,750	+19.49%
35	Arnold	City	Jefferson		20,994	20,858	+0.65%
36	Rolla	City	Phelps		20,588	19,943	+3.23%
37	Warrensburg	City	Johnson		20,283	20,313	−0.15%
38	Farmington	City	St. Francois		19,226	18,217	+5.54%
39	Lake St. Louis	City	St. Charles		19,129	16,707	+14.50%
40	Creve Coeur	City	St. Louis		18,480	18,834	−1.88%
41	Manchester	City	St. Louis		18,069	18,333	−1.44%
42	Ferguson	City	St. Louis		17,953	18,527	−3.10%
43	Kirksville	City	Adair		17,863	17,530	+1.90%
44	Clayton	City	St. Louis		17,807	17,355	+2.60%
45	Grain Valley	City	Jackson		16,908	15,627	+8.20%
46	Hannibal	City	Marion	Ralls	16,804	17,108	−1.78%
47	Poplar Bluff	City	Butler		16,295	16,225	+0.43%
48	Jackson	City	Cape Girardeau		16,033	15,481	+3.57%
49	Sikeston	City	Scott	New Madrid	15,983	16,291	−1.89%
50	Washington	City	Franklin		15,906	14,500	+9.70%
51	Carthage	City	Jasper		15,895	15,522	+2.40%
52	Lebanon	City	Laclede		15,663	15,013	+4.33%
53	Overland	City	St. Louis		15,474	15,955	−3.01%
54	Troy	City	Lincoln		15,201	12,686	+19.83%
55	Dardenne Prairie	City	St. Charles		15,032	12,743	+17.96%
56	Neosho	City	Newton		14,078	12,590	+11.82%
57	Festus	City	Jefferson		14,066	12,706	+10.70%
58	Marshall	City	Saline		13,766	13,806	−0.29%
59	Moberly	City	Randolph		13,719	13,783	−0.46%
60	Webb City	City	Jasper		13,459	13,031	+3.28%
61	Union	City	Franklin		13,445	12,348	+8.88%
62	Eureka	City	St. Louis	Jefferson	13,422	11,646	+15.25%
63	Jennings	City	St. Louis		13,093	12,895	+1.54%
64	Branson	City	Taney	Stone	12,921	12,638	+2.24%
65	Fulton	City	Callaway		12,853	12,600	+2.01%
66	West Plains	City	Howell		12,780	12,184	+4.89%
67	St. Ann	City	St. Louis		12,617	13,019	−3.09%
68	Crestwood	City	St. Louis		12,207	12,404	−1.59%
69	Bolivar	City	Polk		11,994	10,679	+12.31%
70	Town and Country	City	St. Louis		11,619	11,640	−0.18%
71	Mexico	City	Audrain		11,558	11,469	+0.78%
72	Kearney	City	Clay		11,296	10,404	+8.57%
73	Bridgeton	City	St. Louis		11,277	11,445	−1.47%
74	Smithville	City	Clay	Platte	11,160	10,406	+7.25%
75	Excelsior Springs	City	Clay	Ray	10,819	10,553	+2.52%
76	Bellefontaine Neighbors	City	St. Louis		10,368	10,740	−3.46%
77	Ellisville	City	St. Louis		10,315	9,985	+3.30%
78	Monett	City	Barry	Lawrence	10,248	9,576	+7.02%
79	Kennett	City	Dunklin		10,118	10,515	−3.78%
80	Maryville	City	Nodaway		10,092	10,633	−5.09%
81	Harrisonville	City	Cass		10,040	10,121	−0.80%
82	Warrenton	City	Warren		9,667	8,429	+14.69%
83	Clinton	City	Henry		9,504	9,174	+3.60%
84	Oak Grove	City	Jackson	Lafayette	9,370	8,157	+14.87%
85	Chillicothe	City	Livingston		9,114	9,107	+0.08%
86	Des Peres	City	St. Louis		9,102	9,193	−0.99%
87	Parkville	City	Platte		9,093	7,117	+27.76%
88	Richmond Heights	City	St. Louis		9,093	9,286	−2.08%
89	Sunset Hills	City	St. Louis		9,075	9,198	−1.34%
90	Pleasant Hill	City	Cass	Jackson	8,956	8,777	+2.04%
91	Olivette	City	St. Louis		8,937	8,504	+5.09%
92	Ladue	City	St. Louis		8,934	8,989	−0.61%
93	Park Hills	City	St. Francois		8,753	8,587	+1.93%
94	Perryville	City	Perry		8,593	8,555	+0.44%
95	Carl Junction	City	Jasper		8,484	8,143	+4.19%
96	Nevada	City	Vernon		8,404	8,212	+2.34%
97	Brentwood	City	St. Louis		8,079	8,233	−1.87%
98	Marshfield	City	Webster		8,078	7,458	+8.31%
99	Maplewood	City	St. Louis		8,033	8,269	−2.85%
100	Berkeley	City	St. Louis		8,026	8,228	−2.46%
101	Boonville	City	Cooper		7,867	7,964	−1.22%
102	Dexter	City	Stoddard		7,851	7,927	−0.96%
103	Pacific	City	Franklin	St. Louis	7,824	7,414	+5.53%
104	Aurora	City	Lawrence		7,686	7,219	+6.47%
105	Cameron	City	Clinton	DeKalb, Caldwell	7,341	8,513	−13.77%
106	Sullivan	City	Franklin	Crawford	6,942	6,906	+0.52%
107	Willard	City	Greene		6,904	6,344	+8.83%
108	Valley Park	City	St. Louis		6,767	6,885	−1.71%
109	Cottleville	City	St. Charles		6,717	5,611	+19.71%
110	Bonne Terre	City	St. Francois		6,636	6,903	−3.87%
111	Black Jack	City	St. Louis		6,547	6,634	−1.31%
112	De Soto	City	Jefferson		6,527	6,449	+1.21%
113	St. John	City	St. Louis		6,441	6,643	−3.04%
114	Peculiar	City	Cass		6,365	5,621	+13.24%
115	Battlefield	City	Greene		6,361	5,990	+6.19%
116	Greenwood	City	Jackson	Cass	6,315	6,021	+4.88%
117	Pevely	City	Jefferson		6,239	6,026	+3.53%
118	Shrewsbury	City	St. Louis		6,231	6,406	−2.73%
119	Glendale	City	St. Louis		6,060	6,176	−1.88%
120	Richmond	City	Ray		5,968	6,013	−0.75%
121	Wright City	City	Warren		5,854	4,881	+19.93%
122	Rogersville	City	Greene	Webster	5,754	3,897	+47.65%
123	Odessa	City	Lafayette		5,721	5,593	+2.29%
124	North Kansas City	City	Clay		5,613	4,467	+25.65%
125	St. Robert	City	Pulaski		5,602	5,192	+7.90%
126	Waynesville	City	Pulaski		5,558	5,406	+2.81%
127	Trenton	City	Grundy		5,557	5,609	−0.93%
128	Macon	City	Macon		5,532	5,457	+1.37%
129	Herculaneum	City	Jefferson		5,402	4,672	+15.63%
130	Weldon Spring	City	St. Charles		5,301	5,326	−0.47%
131	Ashland	City	Boone		5,221	4,747	+9.99%
132	Caruthersville	City	Pemiscot		5,211	5,562	−6.31%
133	Savannah	City	Andrew		5,107	5,069	+0.75%
134	Osage Beach	City	Camden	Miller	5,079	4,637	+9.53%
135	Ste. Genevieve	City	Ste. Genevieve		5,065	4,999	+1.32%
136	Platte City	City	Platte		4,911	4,824	+1.80%
137	Mount Vernon	City	Lawrence		4,835	4,526	+6.83%
138	Dellwood	City	St. Louis		4,825	4,914	−1.81%
139	Desloge	City	St. Francois		4,819	4,823	−0.08%
140	St. Clair	City	Franklin		4,813	4,791	+0.46%
141	Eldon	City	Miller		4,785	4,416	+8.36%
142	Holts Summit	City	Callaway		4,773	4,458	+7.07%
143	Higginsville	City	Lafayette		4,770	4,817	−0.98%
144	Centralia	City	Boone	Audrain	4,767	4,541	+4.98%
145	Mountain Grove	City	Wright	Texas	4,754	4,313	+10.22%
146	Charleston	City	Mississippi		4,731	5,056	−6.43%
147	Crystal City	City	Jefferson		4,694	4,740	−0.97%
148	Hollister	City	Taney		4,690	4,583	+2.33%
149	Salem	City	Dent		4,674	5,005	−6.61%
150	Rock Hill	City	St. Louis		4,668	4,750	−1.73%
151	Scott City	City	Scott	Cape Girardeau	4,593	4,346	+5.68%
152	Fredericktown	City	Madison		4,584	4,429	+3.50%
153	Riverside	City	Platte		4,581	4,013	+14.15%
154	Lexington	City	Lafayette		4,568	4,652	−1.81%
155	California	City	Moniteau		4,523	4,498	+0.56%
156	Bowling Green	City	Pike		4,472	4,195	+6.60%
157	Moscow Mills	City	Lincoln		4,388	3,317	+32.29%
158	Normandy	City	St. Louis		4,380	4,287	+2.17%
159	Breckenridge Hills	City	St. Louis		4,350	4,458	−2.42%
160	Lamar	City	Barton		4,337	4,266	+1.66%
161	Butler	City	Bates		4,317	4,220	+2.30%
162	Brookfield	City	Linn		4,083	4,111	−0.68%
163	Fenton	City	St. Louis		4,060	3,989	+1.78%
164	Camdenton	City	Camden		4,050	3,960	+2.27%
165	St. James	City	Phelps		3,925	3,935	−0.25%
166	Woodson Terrace	City	St. Louis		3,902	3,950	−1.22%
167	St. Paul	City	St. Charles		3,849	3,005	+28.09%
168	Frontenac	City	St. Louis		3,790	3,612	+4.93%
169	Palmyra	City	Marion		3,649	3,613	+1.00%
170	El Dorado Springs	City	Cedar		3,642	3,493	+4.27%
171	Northwoods	City	St. Louis		3,579	3,687	−2.93%
172	Buffalo	City	Dallas		3,550	3,290	+7.90%
173	Carrollton	City	Carroll		3,499	3,514	−0.43%
174	Hillsboro	City	Jefferson		3,493	3,473	+0.58%
175	Malden	City	Dunklin		3,493	3,706	−5.75%
176	Cassville	City	Barry		3,301	3,190	+3.48%
177	Cuba	City	Crawford		3,288	3,181	+3.36%
178	Ava	City	Douglas		3,231	2,894	+11.64%
179	Sugar Creek	City	Jackson	Clay	3,209	3,271	−1.90%
180	Louisiana	City	Pike		3,208	3,199	+0.28%
181	Oronogo	City	Jasper		3,204	2,558	+25.25%
182	Byrnes Mill	City	Jefferson		3,183	3,173	+0.32%
183	Clever	City	Christian		3,143	2,918	+7.71%
184	Vandalia	City	Audrain	Ralls	3,029	3,553	−14.75%
185	Chaffee	City	Scott		3,017	3,057	−1.31%
186	Knob Noster	City	Johnson		2,997	2,782	+7.73%
187	Licking	City	Texas		2,958	2,851	+3.75%
188	Bethany	City	Harrison		2,956	2,915	+1.41%
189	Buckner	City	Jackson		2,891	2,945	−1.83%
190	Windsor	City	Henry	Pettis	2,869	2,775	+3.39%
191	Fayette	City	Howard		2,848	2,803	+1.61%
192	East Prairie	City	Mississippi		2,841	2,943	−3.47%
193	Owensville	City	Gasconade		2,802	2,757	+1.63%
194	Strafford	City	Greene	Webster	2,789	2,561	+8.90%
195	Montgomery City	City	Montgomery		2,782	2,811	−1.03%
196	Tipton	City	Moniteau		2,766	2,920	−5.27%
197	Canton	City	Lewis		2,763	2,774	−0.40%
198	Lake Lotawana	City	Jackson		2,756	2,310	+19.31%
199	Forsyth	City	Taney		2,752	2,730	+0.81%
200	Pleasant Valley	City	Clay		2,747	2,743	+0.15%
201	Monroe City	City	Monroe	Marion, Ralls	2,714	2,652	+2.34%
202	Versailles	City	Morgan		2,713	2,539	+6.85%
203	Portageville	City	New Madrid	Pemiscot	2,702	2,942	−8.16%
204	Pine Lawn	City	St. Louis		2,682	2,754	−2.61%
205	Green Park	City	St. Louis		2,670	2,705	−1.29%
206	Mountain View	City	Howell		2,661	2,533	+5.05%
207	New Madrid	City	New Madrid		2,586	2,787	−7.21%
208	Potosi	City	Washington		2,568	2,538	+1.18%
209	Lawson	City	Clay	Ray	2,541	2,541	0.00%
210	Clarkson Valley	City	St. Louis		2,540	2,609	−2.64%
211	Country Club	Village	Andrew		2,512	2,487	+1.01%
212	Pagedale	City	St. Louis		2,511	2,554	−1.68%
213	Village of Four Seasons	Village	Camden		2,473	2,383	+3.78%
214	New Haven	City	Franklin		2,397	2,414	−0.70%
215	Holden	City	Johnson		2,347	2,210	+6.20%
216	Duquesne	Village	Jasper		2,345	2,159	+8.62%
217	Kimberling City	City	Stone		2,345	2,344	+0.04%
218	Seneca	City	Newton		2,343	2,230	+5.07%
219	Concordia	City	Lafayette		2,338	2,371	−1.39%
220	Warsaw	City	Benton		2,338	2,209	+5.84%
221	Riverview	Village	St. Louis		2,330	2,397	−2.80%
222	Houston	City	Texas		2,281	2,079	+9.72%
223	Hayti	City	Pemiscot		2,277	2,493	−8.66%
224	Lathrop	City	Clinton		2,253	2,271	−0.79%
225	Lake Ozark	City	Miller	Camden	2,247	2,077	+8.18%
226	Plattsburg	City	Clinton		2,239	2,222	+0.77%
227	Hermann	City	Gasconade		2,221	2,185	+1.65%
228	Willow Springs	City	Howell		2,211	2,164	+2.17%
229	Marlborough	Village	St. Louis		2,185	2,221	−1.62%
230	Noel	City	McDonald		2,181	2,124	+2.68%
231	Weatherby Lake	City	Platte		2,139	2,077	+2.99%
232	Marceline	City	Linn	Chariton	2,116	2,123	−0.33%
233	Granby	City	Newton		2,113	2,050	+3.07%
234	Elsberry	City	Lincoln		2,108	1,937	+8.83%
235	Marionville	City	Lawrence		2,108	2,054	+2.63%
236	Duenweg	City	Jasper		2,100	1,495	+40.47%
237	Moline Acres	City	St. Louis		2,093	2,156	−2.92%
238	Cabool	City	Texas		2,089	1,946	+7.35%
239	Merriam Woods	City	Taney		2,084	2,006	+3.89%
240	Anderson	City	McDonald		2,073	1,981	+4.64%
241	Bel-Ridge	Village	St. Louis		2,070	2,132	−2.91%
242	Warson Woods	City	St. Louis		1,990	2,018	−1.39%
243	Hanley Hills	Village	St. Louis		1,963	2,009	−2.29%
244	Kahoka	City	Clark		1,962	1,961	+0.05%
245	Seymour	City	Webster		1,960	1,841	+6.46%
246	Sparta	City	Christian		1,953	1,876	+4.10%
247	Vinita Park	City	St. Louis		1,923	1,970	−2.39%
248	Thayer	City	Oregon		1,898	1,883	+0.80%
249	Lone Jack	City	Jackson		1,896	1,492	+27.08%
250	Carterville	City	Jasper		1,869	1,855	+0.75%
251	Lake Winnebago	City	Cass		1,869	1,433	+30.43%
252	Piedmont	City	Wayne		1,862	1,897	−1.85%
253	Weston	City	Platte		1,855	1,756	+5.64%
254	Gallatin	City	Daviess		1,848	1,821	+1.48%
255	Bernie	City	Stoddard		1,828	1,859	−1.67%
256	Stockton	City	Cedar		1,825	1,683	+8.44%
257	Slater	City	Saline		1,824	1,834	−0.55%
258	Adrian	City	Bates		1,798	1,730	+3.93%
259	Doniphan	City	Ripley		1,784	1,781	+0.17%
260	Memphis	City	Scotland		1,762	1,731	+1.79%
261	Hallsville	City	Boone		1,742	1,614	+7.93%
262	Milan	City	Sullivan		1,742	1,819	−4.23%
263	Richland	City	Pulaski	Camden, Laclede	1,737	1,734	+0.17%
264	Bloomfield	City	Stoddard		1,734	1,755	−1.20%
265	Albany	City	Gentry		1,730	1,679	+3.04%
266	Hamilton	City	Caldwell		1,726	1,690	+2.13%
267	Steele	City	Pemiscot		1,692	1,853	−8.69%
268	Wardsville	Village	Cole		1,667	1,599	+4.25%
269	Unionville	City	Putnam		1,663	1,735	−4.15%
270	Winfield	City	Lincoln		1,660	1,518	+9.35%
271	Fair Grove	City	Greene		1,645	1,582	+3.98%
272	Garden City	City	Cass		1,617	1,629	−0.74%
273	Wellston	City	St. Louis		1,580	1,537	+2.80%
274	Salisbury	City	Chariton		1,564	1,563	+0.06%
275	Shelbina	City	Shelby		1,550	1,613	−3.91%
276	Bourbon	City	Crawford		1,544	1,567	−1.47%
277	Ash Grove	City	Greene		1,532	1,512	+1.32%
278	Gower	City	Clinton	Buchanan	1,514	1,533	−1.24%
279	Lakeshire	City	St. Louis		1,510	1,554	−2.83%
280	Crane	City	Stone		1,509	1,495	+0.94%
281	Senath	City	Dunklin		1,504	1,593	−5.59%
282	Campbell	City	Dunklin		1,489	1,605	−7.23%
283	Tarkio	City	Atchison		1,478	1,506	−1.86%
284	Linn	City	Osage		1,453	1,350	+7.63%
285	Steelville	City	Crawford		1,447	1,472	−1.70%
286	Sarcoxie	City	Jasper		1,429	1,406	+1.64%
287	Ironton	City	Iron		1,408	1,475	−4.54%
288	Winchester	City	St. Louis		1,400	1,447	−3.25%
289	Marble Hill	City	Bollinger		1,380	1,388	−0.58%
290	Belle	City	Maries	Osage	1,379	1,381	−0.14%
291	Oakland	City	St. Louis		1,372	1,390	−1.29%
292	Claycomo	Village	Clay		1,362	1,343	+1.41%
293	Huntsville	City	Randolph		1,362	1,376	−1.02%
294	Bel-Nor	Village	St. Louis		1,351	1,399	−3.43%
295	Gerald	City	Franklin		1,350	1,361	−0.81%
296	Advance	City	Stoddard		1,323	1,349	−1.93%
297	Sweet Springs	City	Saline		1,323	1,316	+0.53%
298	Goodman	City	McDonald		1,320	1,202	+9.82%
299	Mansfield	City	Wright		1,317	1,193	+10.39%
300	Velda City	City	St. Louis		1,309	1,188	+10.19%
301	Archie	City	Cass		1,305	1,268	+2.92%
302	Marthasville	City	Warren		1,302	1,245	+4.58%
303	Charlack	City	St. Louis		1,275	1,304	−2.22%
304	Pierce City	City	Lawrence	Barry	1,275	1,251	+1.92%
305	Rich Hill	City	Bates		1,264	1,232	+2.60%
306	La Plata	City	Macon		1,251	1,257	−0.48%
307	Rock Port	City	Atchison		1,246	1,278	−2.50%
308	Greenfield	City	Dade		1,242	1,220	+1.80%
309	St. Martins	City	Cole		1,242	1,191	+4.28%
310	Bismarck	City	St. Francois		1,224	1,239	−1.21%
311	Reeds Spring	City	Stone		1,223	1,136	+7.66%
312	Dixon	City	Pulaski		1,222	1,232	−0.81%
313	Lincoln	City	Benton		1,197	1,144	+4.63%
314	Oran	City	Scott		1,195	1,195	0.00%
315	Billings	City	Christian		1,182	1,084	+9.04%
316	Hillsdale	Village	St. Louis		1,180	1,216	−2.96%
317	Paris	City	Monroe		1,178	1,161	+1.46%
318	Taos	City	Cole		1,175	1,150	+2.17%
319	Cole Camp	City	Benton		1,169	1,104	+5.89%
320	Stanberry	City	Gentry		1,168	1,129	+3.45%
321	Leadwood	City	St. Francois		1,158	1,178	−1.70%
322	Calverton Park	City	St. Louis		1,134	1,143	−0.79%
323	Fremont Hills	City	Christian		1,098	1,049	+4.67%
324	Appleton City	City	St. Clair		1,096	1,032	+6.20%
325	Loch Lloyd	Village	Cass		1,090	863	+26.30%
326	Laurie	City	Morgan	Camden	1,087	939	+15.76%
327	Glasgow	City	Howard	Chariton	1,080	1,087	−0.64%
328	Maysville	City	DeKalb		1,071	1,095	−2.19%
329	Stover	City	Morgan		1,064	1,006	+5.77%
330	Purdy	City	Barry		1,062	1,031	+3.01%
331	Truesdale	City	Warren		1,054	853	+23.56%
332	Auxvasse	City	Callaway		1,029	1,001	+2.80%
333	New Franklin	City	Howard		1,026	1,027	−0.10%
334	La Monte	City	Pettis		1,018	1,014	+0.39%
335	Edina	City	Knox		1,014	1,012	+0.20%
336	Osceola	City	St. Clair		1,012	909	+11.33%
337	Wellsville	City	Montgomery		1,012	998	+1.40%
338	Loma Linda	Town	Newton		1,009	943	+7.00%
339	Cool Valley	City	St. Louis		1,005	1,039	−3.27%
340	Mound City	City	Holt		999	1,004	−0.50%
341	Country Club Hills	City	St. Louis		998	1,014	−1.58%
342	Winona	City	Shannon		987	950	+3.89%
343	Drexel	City	Cass	Bates	982	968	+1.45%
344	New London	City	Ralls		981	943	+4.03%
345	Highlandville	City	Christian		974	963	+1.14%
346	Princeton	City	Mercer		970	1,007	−3.67%
347	Southwest City	Town	McDonald		969	922	+5.10%
348	Sturgeon	City	Boone		957	907	+5.51%
349	Seligman	City	Barry		951	813	+16.97%
350	Clarkton	City	Dunklin		944	1,009	−6.44%
351	Humansville	City	Polk		942	907	+3.86%
352	Lake Waukomis	City	Platte		941	888	+5.97%
353	Grantwood Village	Town	St. Louis		925	941	−1.70%
354	Benton	City	Scott		919	866	+6.12%
355	Crocker	City	Pulaski		919	929	−1.08%
356	Foristell	City	Warren	St. Charles	919	550	+67.09%
357	Diamond	Town	Newton		906	831	+9.03%
358	Lilbourn	City	New Madrid		906	994	−8.85%
359	Miner	City	Scott	Mississippi	894	916	−2.40%
360	Pasadena Hills	City	St. Louis		881	912	−3.40%
361	Norwood Court	Town	St. Louis		877	890	−1.46%
362	Jasper	City	Jasper		870	906	−3.97%
363	Puxico	City	Stoddard		867	873	−0.69%
364	Jonesburg	City	Montgomery		864	726	+19.01%
365	Lockwood	City	Dade		863	846	+2.01%
366	Velda Village Hills	City	St. Louis		851	881	−3.41%
367	King City	City	Gentry		845	799	+5.76%
368	Edmundson	City	St. Louis		842	860	−2.09%
369	Pineville	City	McDonald		836	802	+4.24%
370	Oregon	City	Holt		827	837	−1.19%
371	Fordland	City	Webster		824	778	+5.91%
372	Airport Drive	Village	Jasper		822	766	+7.31%
373	Waverly	City	Lafayette		819	784	+4.46%
374	Rockaway Beach	City	Taney		816	829	−1.57%
375	La Grange	City	Lewis		806	825	−2.30%
376	Russellville	City	Cole		806	778	+3.60%
377	Brunswick	City	Chariton		798	801	−0.37%
378	Grant City	Town	Worth		794	817	−2.82%
379	Van Buren	Town	Carter		792	747	+6.02%
380	Leadington	City	St. Francois		785	764	+2.75%
381	Gainesville	City	Ozark		784	745	+5.23%
382	Lake Tapawingo	City	Jackson		782	794	−1.51%
383	Ellington	City	Reynolds		777	790	−1.65%
384	Hawk Point	City	Lincoln		772	676	+14.20%
385	Exeter	City	Barry		765	733	+4.37%
386	Wellington	City	Lafayette		761	738	+3.12%
387	Braymer	City	Caldwell		756	737	+2.58%
388	New Bloomfield	City	Callaway		747	687	+8.73%
389	Wood Heights	City	Ray		745	757	−1.59%
390	Orrick	City	Ray		740	753	−1.73%
391	Conway	City	Laclede		738	729	+1.23%
392	Bella Villa	City	St. Louis		723	757	−4.49%
393	Stewartsville	City	DeKalb		723	733	−1.36%
394	Iberia	City	Miller		722	703	+2.70%
395	Clarence	City	Shelby		720	738	−2.44%
396	Miller	City	Lawrence		715	704	+1.56%
397	Olympian Village	City	Jefferson		710	719	−1.25%
398	Gideon	City	New Madrid		709	780	−9.10%
399	Alton	City	Oregon		702	707	−0.71%
400	Flordell Hills	City	St. Louis		702	724	−3.04%
401	Pilot Knob	City	Iron		701	671	+4.47%
402	Bertrand	City	Mississippi		698	718	−2.79%
403	Pleasant Hope	City	Polk		694	657	+5.63%
404	Pilot Grove	City	Cooper		693	665	+4.21%
405	Wheaton	City	Barry		693	672	+3.13%
406	Lancaster	City	Schuyler		691	675	+2.37%
407	Perry	City	Ralls		686	665	+3.16%
408	Bloomsdale	City	Ste. Genevieve		683	639	+6.89%
409	Morehouse	City	New Madrid		681	741	−8.10%
410	Morley	City	Scott		668	630	+6.03%
411	Golden City	City	Barton		659	656	+0.46%
412	Trimble	City	Clinton		659	573	+15.01%
413	Hermitage	City	Hickory		658	621	+5.96%
414	Lowry City	City	St. Clair		657	613	+7.18%
415	Ferrelview	Village	Platte		656	642	+2.18%
416	La Belle	City	Lewis		654	664	−1.51%
417	Innsbrook	Village	Warren		653	596	+9.56%
418	Viburnum	City	Iron		652	667	−2.25%
419	Agency	Village	Buchanan		651	671	−2.98%
420	New Florence	City	Montgomery		650	641	+1.40%
421	Cleveland	City	Cass		649	650	−0.15%
422	Iron Mountain Lake	City	St. Francois		647	640	+1.09%
423	Leawood	Village	Newton		643	620	+3.71%
424	Liberal	City	Barton		638	629	+1.43%
425	Parkway	Village	Franklin		636	663	−4.07%
426	Walnut Grove	City	Greene		636	652	−2.45%
427	Greendale	City	St. Louis		634	642	−1.25%
428	Norborne	City	Carroll		632	634	−0.32%
429	Fairfax	City	Atchison		627	648	−3.24%
430	Hartville	City	Wright		627	594	+5.56%
431	Gordonville	Village	Cape Girardeau		626	625	+0.16%
432	Bevier	City	Macon		625	636	−1.73%
433	Norwood	City	Wright		621	578	+7.44%
434	Edgerton	City	Platte		607	601	+1.00%
435	Arcadia	City	Iron		605	618	−2.10%
436	Green Ridge	City	Pettis		601	468	+28.42%
437	Alba	City	Jasper		589	544	+8.27%
438	Holcomb	City	Dunklin		589	642	−8.26%
439	Twin Oaks	Village	St. Louis		583	605	−3.64%
440	Indian Point	Village	Stone		580	550	+5.45%
441	Queen City	City	Schuyler		572	562	+1.78%
442	Vienna	City	Maries		572	581	−1.55%
443	Green City	City	Sullivan		570	602	−5.32%
444	Jamesport	City	Daviess		570	559	+1.97%
445	Flint Hill	City	St. Charles		566	981	−42.30%
446	Doolittle	City	Phelps		565	564	+0.18%
447	Leeton	City	Johnson		565	532	+6.20%
448	Birch Tree	City	Shannon		561	541	+3.70%
449	Hardin	City	Ray		560	571	−1.93%
450	Kelso	Village	Scott		551	554	−0.54%
451	New Melle	City	St. Charles		550	541	+1.66%
452	Sycamore Hills	Village	St. Louis		546	561	−2.67%
453	Center	City	Ralls		542	528	+2.65%
454	Glenaire	City	Clay		535	539	−0.74%
455	Madison	City	Monroe		535	515	+3.88%
456	Sunrise Beach	Village	Camden	Morgan	533	431	+23.67%
457	Eminence	City	Shannon		532	515	+3.30%
458	Cardwell	City	Dunklin		529	561	−5.70%
459	Josephville	Village	St. Charles		529	512	+3.32%
460	Verona	Town	Lawrence		520	507	+2.56%
461	Dearborn	City	Platte	Buchanan	518	482	+7.47%
462	Lewistown	Town	Lewis		512	521	−1.73%
463	Freeman	City	Cass		508	475	+6.95%
464	Laddonia	City	Audrain		508	502	+1.20%
465	Polo	City	Caldwell		508	509	−0.20%
466	Smithton	City	Pettis		508	506	+0.40%
467	Parma	City	New Madrid		506	555	−8.83%
468	Bland	City	Gasconade	Osage	505	506	−0.20%
469	Crystal Lake Park	City	St. Louis		501	508	−1.38%
470	Hornersville	City	Dunklin		500	537	−6.89%
471	Shelbyville	City	Shelby		497	518	−4.05%
472	Matthews	City	New Madrid		493	534	−7.68%
473	Branson West	City	Stone		485	484	+0.21%
474	Burlington Junction	City	Nodaway		483	521	−7.29%
475	Eolia	Village	Pike		482	472	+2.12%
476	Holt	City	Clay	Clinton	482	471	+2.34%
477	Urich	City	Henry		478	463	+3.24%
478	Camden Point	City	Platte		474	457	+3.72%
479	Galena	City	Stone		474	455	+4.18%
480	Summersville	City	Texas	Shannon	474	453	+4.64%
481	Hayti Heights	City	Pemiscot		466	515	−9.51%
482	Qulin	City	Butler		466	460	+1.30%
483	Beverly Hills	City	St. Louis		456	475	−4.00%
484	Bell City	City	Stoddard		453	464	−2.37%
485	Fair Play	City	Polk		452	422	+7.11%
486	Otterville	City	Cooper		450	440	+2.27%
487	Keytesville	City	Chariton		446	440	+1.36%
488	Higbee	City	Randolph		442	459	−3.70%
489	Greenville	City	Wayne		440	443	−0.68%
490	Sheldon	City	Vernon		438	435	+0.69%
491	Hopkins	City	Nodaway		437	472	−7.42%
492	Naylor	City	Ripley		435	440	−1.14%
493	St. Elizabeth	Village	Miller		435	418	+4.07%
494	Corder	City	Lafayette		433	418	+3.59%
495	Fairview	Town	Newton		432	419	+3.10%
496	Avondale	City	Clay		430	436	−1.38%
497	Pasadena Park	Village	St. Louis		426	435	−2.07%
498	Niangua	City	Webster		425	390	+8.97%
499	Wilbur Park	Village	St. Louis		425	439	−3.19%
500	Ellsinore	City	Carter		421	416	+1.20%
501	Butterfield	City	Barry		420	378	+11.11%
502	Weaubleau	City	Hickory		415	378	+9.79%
503	Meadville	City	Linn		413	415	−0.48%
504	Urbana	City	Dallas		411	387	+6.20%
505	Bucklin	City	Linn		410	413	−0.73%
506	Ravenwood	Town	Nodaway		409	439	−6.83%
507	Washburn	City	Barry		408	407	+0.25%
508	Freeburg	Village	Osage		407	409	−0.49%
509	Oak Grove Village	Village	Franklin		407	412	−1.21%
510	Calhoun	City	Henry		406	392	+3.57%
511	Bull Creek	Village	Taney		405	426	−4.93%
512	Jane	Town	McDonald		405	359	+12.81%
513	Westphalia	City	Osage		404	378	+6.88%
514	Wayland	City	Clark		399	408	−2.21%
515	Morrisville	Town	Polk		398	376	+5.85%
516	Rosebud	City	Gasconade		396	390	+1.54%
517	Crystal Lakes	City	Ray		395	390	+1.28%
518	Platte Woods	City	Platte		395	394	+0.25%
519	Ewing	City	Lewis		394	406	−2.96%
520	Alma	City	Lafayette		392	400	−2.00%
521	Montrose	City	Henry		392	383	+2.35%
522	Greentop	City	Schuyler	Adair	391	388	+0.77%
523	Essex	City	Stoddard		390	403	−3.23%
524	Arbyrd	City	Dunklin		387	404	−4.21%
525	Chamois	City	Osage		387	377	+2.65%
526	Novinger	City	Adair		386	383	+0.78%
527	Deepwater	City	Henry		382	355	+7.61%
528	Delta	City	Cape Girardeau		382	376	+1.60%
529	Shoal Creek Drive	Village	Newton		381	356	+7.02%
530	Lanagan	Town	McDonald		379	373	+1.61%
531	Ridgeway	City	Harrison		378	372	+1.61%
532	Clarksville	City	Pike		377	372	+1.34%
533	Hale	City	Carroll		375	375	0.00%
534	Union Star	Town	DeKalb		372	380	−2.11%
535	Irondale	City	Washington		371	368	+0.82%
536	Raymondville	Town	Texas		371	345	+7.54%
537	Atlanta	City	Macon		370	379	−2.37%
538	Osborn	City	DeKalb	Clinton	369	374	−1.34%
539	Oakview	Village	Clay		364	366	−0.55%
540	Marston	City	New Madrid		362	397	−8.82%
541	Windsor Place	Village	Cooper		361	358	+0.84%
542	West Alton	City	St. Charles		354	359	−1.39%
543	Huntleigh	City	St. Louis		352	361	−2.49%
544	Tracy	City	Platte		345	269	+28.25%
545	Pattonsburg	City	Daviess		341	314	+8.60%
546	Creighton	City	Cass		340	327	+3.98%
547	Bunceton	City	Cooper		338	334	+1.20%
548	Bellflower	City	Montgomery		337	325	+3.69%
549	Frankford	City	Pike		337	343	−1.75%
550	Gilman City	City	Daviess	Harrison	337	329	+2.43%
551	Saginaw	Village	Newton		333	300	+11.00%
552	Jamestown	Town	Moniteau		332	330	+0.61%
553	Newburg	City	Phelps		331	333	−0.60%
554	Altenburg	City	Perry		324	341	−4.99%
555	Sibley	Village	Jackson		324	314	+3.18%
556	Portage Des Sioux	City	St. Charles		321	335	−4.18%
557	Purcell	City	Jasper		320	318	+0.63%
558	Cooter	City	Pemiscot		319	343	−7.00%
559	Diggins	Village	Webster		319	305	+4.59%
560	Leasburg	Village	Crawford		318	326	−2.45%
561	Lake Lafayette	City	Lafayette		315	277	+13.72%
562	Saddlebrooke	Village	Christian	Taney	315	309	+1.94%
563	East Lynne	City	Cass		312	294	+6.12%
564	Neelyville	City	Butler		312	318	−1.89%
565	St. Mary	City	Ste. Genevieve		312	309	+0.97%
566	Blue Eye	Town	Stone		310	289	+7.27%
567	Fisk	City	Butler		309	312	−0.96%
568	Downing	City	Schuyler		308	300	+2.67%
569	Westwood	Village	St. Louis		308	316	−2.53%
570	Uplands Park	Village	St. Louis		305	312	−2.24%
571	Wheatland	City	Hickory		304	277	+9.75%
572	Laclede	City	Linn		300	305	−1.64%
573	Bunker	City	Dent	Reynolds	297	295	+0.68%
574	Chilhowee	Town	Johnson		295	291	+1.37%
575	Kingston	City	Caldwell		294	290	+1.38%
576	Northmoor	City	Platte		294	291	+1.03%
577	Carytown	City	Jasper		293	287	+2.09%
578	Centertown	Town	Cole		292	284	+2.82%
579	Hume	Town	Bates		290	283	+2.47%
580	Harrisburg	Town	Boone		289	271	+6.64%
581	Junction City	Village	Madison		287	283	+1.41%
582	Cainsville	City	Harrison		285	283	+0.71%
583	Kidder	City	Caldwell		284	267	+6.37%
584	Eagleville	Town	Harrison		283	275	+2.91%
585	Wardell	Town	Pemiscot		283	310	−8.71%
586	Everton	City	Dade		282	273	+3.30%
587	Old Monroe	City	Lincoln		281	249	+12.85%
588	West Sullivan	Town	Crawford		281	285	−1.40%
589	Linneus	City	Linn		277	281	−1.42%
590	Maitland	City	Holt		276	276	0.00%
591	Mindenmines	City	Barton		276	271	+1.85%
592	Williamsville	City	Wayne		274	279	−1.79%
593	Henrietta	City	Ray		273	278	−1.80%
594	Berger	City	Franklin		271	256	+5.86%
595	Taneyville	Village	Taney		270	274	−1.46%
596	Prairie Home	City	Cooper		268	262	+2.29%
597	Silex	City	Lincoln		266	24	+1,008.33%
598	Augusta	Town	St. Charles		265	270	−1.85%
599	Cobalt	Village	Madison		264	264	0.00%
600	Kinloch	City	St. Louis		261	263	−0.76%
601	Risco	City	New Madrid		261	286	−8.74%
602	Farley	Village	Platte		259	265	−2.26%
603	Clarksburg	City	Moniteau		257	254	+1.18%
604	Martinsburg	Town	Audrain		256	251	+1.99%
605	Farber	City	Audrain		254	255	−0.39%
606	Mercer	Town	Mercer		254	263	−3.42%
607	Kingsville	City	Johnson		251	245	+2.45%
608	Breckenridge	City	Caldwell		250	258	−3.10%
609	Howardville	City	New Madrid		250	277	−9.75%
610	Rensselaer	Village	Ralls		249	253	−1.58%
611	Callao	City	Macon		245	251	−2.39%
612	Forest City	City	Holt		245	243	+0.82%
613	Amazonia	Village	Andrew		244	238	+2.52%
614	Clarksdale	City	DeKalb		244	245	−0.41%
615	De Kalb	Town	Buchanan		243	233	+4.29%
616	Frohna	City	Perry		242	245	−1.22%
617	Armstrong	City	Howard		241	243	−0.82%
618	Brashear	City	Adair		240	235	+2.13%
619	Annapolis	City	Iron		239	250	−4.40%
620	Oak Ridge	Town	Cape Girardeau		239	237	+0.84%
621	Clark	City	Randolph	Boone	237	254	−6.69%
622	Fidelity	Town	Jasper		235	227	+3.52%
623	Mineral Point	Town	Washington		235	231	+1.73%
624	Neck City	City	Jasper		234	228	+2.63%
625	Dadeville	Village	Dade		233	226	+3.10%
626	Excelsior Estates	Village	Ray	Clay	233	209	+11.48%
627	Grandin	City	Carter		233	226	+3.10%
628	Lake Tekakwitha	Village	Jefferson		233	230	+1.30%
629	Winston	Village	Daviess		232	229	+1.31%
630	St. Thomas	Town	Cole		231	222	+4.05%
631	Schell City	City	Vernon		230	228	+0.88%
632	Wheeling	City	Livingston		230	220	+4.55%
633	New Hampton	City	Harrison		228	228	0.00%
634	Bates City	City	Lafayette		227	219	+3.65%
635	Houston Lake	City	Platte		227	229	−0.87%
636	Easton	City	Buchanan		226	227	−0.44%
637	Emerald Beach	Village	Barry		226	212	+6.60%
638	Skidmore	City	Nodaway		226	245	−7.76%
639	Amsterdam	City	Bates		225	218	+3.21%
640	Blackburn	City	Saline	Lafayette	225	224	+0.45%
641	McCord Bend	Village	Stone		225	212	+6.13%
642	Linn Creek	City	Camden		223	216	+3.24%
643	Blodgett	City	Scott		222	209	+6.22%
644	Rushville	Village	Buchanan		221	225	−1.78%
645	Utica	Village	Livingston		221	222	−0.45%
646	Spickard	City	Grundy		220	222	−0.90%
647	Missouri City	City	Clay		219	217	+0.92%
648	Mayview	City	Lafayette		218	208	+4.81%
649	Browning	City	Linn	Sullivan	216	219	−1.37%
650	Newtonia	Town	Newton		215	204	+5.39%
651	Blythedale	Village	Harrison		212	211	+0.47%
652	Wyatt	City	Mississippi		212	219	−3.20%
653	Green Castle	City	Sullivan		211	224	−5.80%
654	Rocheport	City	Boone		211	201	+4.98%
655	Napoleon	City	Lafayette		210	211	−0.47%
656	Bosworth	City	Carroll		208	213	−2.35%
657	Stoutland	City	Camden	Laclede	207	209	−0.96%
658	Theodosia	Village	Ozark		207	188	+10.11%
659	Kirbyville	Village	Taney		205	195	+5.13%
660	Wyaconda	City	Clark		204	214	−4.67%
661	Cairo	Village	Randolph		203	205	−0.98%
662	Cedar Hill Lakes	Village	Jefferson		203	203	0.00%
663	Chula	City	Livingston		203	195	+4.10%
664	Curryville	City	Pike		201	197	+2.03%
665	Emma	City	Lafayette	Saline	201	201	0.00%
666	Houstonia	City	Pettis		201	198	+1.52%
667	Oakwood	Village	Clay		199	198	+0.51%
668	Walker	City	Vernon		199	199	0.00%
669	Centerview	City	Johnson		198	189	+4.76%
670	Koshkonong	Town	Oregon		198	196	+1.02%
671	Scotsdale	Town	Jefferson		198	194	+2.06%
672	Oakwood Park	Village	Clay		197	189	+4.23%
673	Edgar Springs	City	Phelps		196	199	−1.51%
674	Asbury	City	Jasper		195	193	+1.04%
675	Blackwater	City	Cooper		192	170	+12.94%
676	Sedgewickville	Village	Bollinger		192	191	+0.52%
677	Tuscumbia	Town	Miller		192	188	+2.13%
678	Bakersfield	Village	Ozark		191	186	+2.69%
679	Homestead	Village	Ray		190	192	−1.04%
680	Malta Bend	Town	Saline		190	187	+1.60%
681	Marquand	City	Madison		190	186	+2.15%
682	Mokane	City	Callaway		188	188	0.00%
683	Birmingham	Village	Clay		187	189	−1.06%
684	High Hill	City	Montgomery		186	186	0.00%
685	Knox City	City	Knox		186	191	−2.62%
686	Vanduser	Village	Scott		186	183	+1.64%
687	Barnard	City	Nodaway		185	201	−7.96%
688	Glenwood	Village	Schuyler		185	181	+2.21%
689	Camden	City	Ray		183	175	+4.57%
690	Freistatt	Village	Lawrence		182	179	+1.68%
691	Gilliam	City	Saline		182	175	+4.00%
692	Meta	City	Osage		182	180	+1.11%
693	Bellerive Acres	City	St. Louis		181	191	−5.24%
694	Fountain N' Lakes	Village	Lincoln		181	169	+7.10%
695	Holland	Town	Pemiscot		181	194	−6.70%
696	Preston	Village	Hickory		181	157	+15.29%
697	Fillmore	City	Andrew		180	173	+4.05%
698	Anniston	Town	Mississippi		179	180	−0.56%
699	Hurley	City	Stone		178	176	+1.14%
700	Lohman	City	Cole		177	175	+1.14%
701	Stotts City	City	Lawrence		175	167	+4.79%
702	Altamont	Village	Daviess		172	171	+0.58%
703	Cowgill	City	Caldwell		172	168	+2.38%
704	Lamar Heights	City	Barton		171	170	+0.59%
705	Stella	Town	Newton		170	166	+2.41%
706	Middletown	Town	Montgomery		169	171	−1.17%
707	Gasconade	City	Gasconade		168	172	−2.33%
708	Jerico Springs	Village	Cedar		168	160	+5.00%
709	Galt	City	Grundy		167	168	−0.60%
710	Conception Junction	Town	Nodaway		166	177	−6.21%
711	Phillipsburg	Village	Laclede		166	164	+1.22%
712	Barnett	City	Morgan		165	158	+4.43%
713	Centerville	City	Reynolds		165	167	−1.20%
714	Bolckow	City	Andrew		164	163	+0.61%
715	Bronaugh	City	Vernon		164	163	+0.61%
716	Mendon	City	Chariton		164	163	+0.61%
717	Bogard	City	Carroll		162	167	−2.99%
718	Syracuse	City	Morgan		162	151	+7.28%
719	Mill Spring	Village	Wayne		159	159	0.00%
720	Redings Mill	Village	Newton		159	164	−3.05%
721	Diehlstadt	Village	Scott		156	157	−0.64%
722	Leslie	Village	Franklin		156	136	+14.71%
723	Parkdale	Village	Jefferson		156	159	−1.89%
724	Laredo	City	Grundy		154	156	−1.28%
725	Coffey	City	Daviess		153	151	+1.32%
726	Hurdland	City	Knox		153	155	−1.29%
727	Halfway	Village	Polk		152	151	+0.66%
728	Hughesville	Village	Pettis		151	150	+0.67%
729	New Cambria	City	Macon		150	153	−1.96%
730	Renick	Village	Randolph		150	154	−2.60%
731	Nelson	City	Saline		149	152	−1.97%
732	Clearmont	City	Nodaway		147	158	−6.96%
733	Prathersville	Village	Clay		147	121	+21.49%
734	Argyle	Town	Osage	Maries	145	144	+0.69%
735	Canalou	City	New Madrid		145	158	−8.23%
736	Miami	City	Saline		143	152	−5.92%
737	Sheridan	Town	Worth		142	145	−2.07%
738	Rockville	City	Bates		141	135	+4.44%
739	La Russell	City	Jasper		140	134	+4.48%
740	Louisburg	Village	Dallas		140	134	+4.48%
741	Pickering	City	Nodaway		140	149	−6.04%
742	Gravois Mills	Town	Morgan		139	129	+7.75%
743	Graham	Town	Nodaway		138	147	−6.12%
744	Purdin	City	Linn		138	141	−2.13%
745	Rhineland	Town	Montgomery		138	139	−0.72%
746	Tina	Village	Carroll		138	139	−0.72%
747	Hartsburg	Town	Boone		137	133	+3.01%
748	Haywood City	Village	Scott		137	133	+3.01%
749	Cross Timbers	City	Hickory		135	119	+13.45%
750	Kingdom City	Village	Callaway		135	134	+0.75%
751	Amoret	City	Bates		134	133	+0.75%
752	Caledonia	Village	Washington		134	131	+2.29%
753	Collins	Village	St. Clair		134	125	+7.20%
754	Hunnewell	City	Shelby		133	139	−4.32%
755	Kimmswick	City	Jefferson		133	133	0.00%
756	Stark City	Town	Newton		131	125	+4.80%
757	Brandsville	City	Howell		129	124	+4.03%
758	Parnell	City	Nodaway		129	135	−4.44%
759	Bethel	Village	Shelby		126	135	−6.67%
760	Oaks	Village	Clay		125	128	−2.34%
761	Turney	Village	Clinton		125	114	+9.65%
762	Rosendale	City	Andrew		124	119	+4.20%
763	West Line	Village	Cass		124	117	+5.98%
764	Jacksonville	Village	Randolph		123	122	+0.82%
765	South Greenfield	Village	Dade		123	122	+0.82%
766	Strasburg	City	Cass		123	107	+14.95%
767	Miramiguoa Park	Village	Franklin		122	126	−3.17%
768	Baring	City	Knox		121	125	−3.20%
769	Des Arc	Village	Iron		121	131	−7.63%
770	Olean	Town	Miller		121	114	+6.14%
771	McFall	City	Gentry		120	119	+0.84%
772	Holliday	Village	Monroe		119	114	+4.39%
773	Fleming	City	Ray		115	114	+0.88%
774	Flemington	Village	Polk		115	110	+4.55%
775	Cosby	Village	Andrew		114	114	0.00%
776	Novelty	Village	Knox		113	102	+10.78%
777	Westboro	City	Atchison		113	116	−2.59%
778	Lake Annette	City	Cass		112	107	+4.67%
779	Ludlow	Town	Livingston		112	111	+0.90%
780	Newtown	Town	Sullivan		110	113	−2.65%
781	Grand Falls Plaza	Town	Newton		108	103	+4.85%
782	Shoal Creek Estates	Village	Newton		108	107	+0.93%
783	Benton City	Village	Audrain		107	101	+5.94%
784	Chain-O-Lakes	Village	Barry		107	106	+0.94%
785	Elmo	City	Nodaway		105	114	−7.89%
786	Halltown	Village	Lawrence		105	104	+0.96%
787	Monticello	Village	Lewis		105	104	+0.96%
788	Mooresville	Village	Livingston		105	98	+7.14%
789	Chain of Rocks	Village	Lincoln		104	97	+7.22%
790	Rush Hill	Village	Audrain		104	103	+0.97%
791	Wentworth	Village	Newton		104	98	+6.12%
792	Craig	City	Holt		103	105	−1.90%
793	Ridgely	Village	Platte		103	95	+8.42%
794	Alexandria	City	Clark		102	105	−2.86%
795	Avilla	Town	Jasper		102	103	−0.97%
796	Dudley	City	Stoddard		101	101	0.00%
797	Mosby	City	Clay		101	101	0.00%
798	Brooklyn Heights	Town	Jasper		100	101	−0.99%
799	Blairstown	City	Henry		98	95	+3.16%
800	Foley	City	Lincoln		97	89	+8.99%
801	Peaceful Village	Village	Jefferson		97	95	+2.11%
802	Pocahontas	Town	Cape Girardeau		97	97	0.00%
803	Allenville	Village	Cape Girardeau		94	95	−1.05%
804	Morrison	City	Gasconade		94	93	+1.08%
805	Roscoe	Village	St. Clair		93	89	+4.49%
806	Lewis and Clark Village	Town	Buchanan		92	96	−4.17%
807	Longtown	Town	Perry		92	90	+2.22%
808	Plato	Village	Texas		91	82	+10.98%
809	Reeds	Town	Jasper		91	91	0.00%
810	Weldon Spring Heights	Town	St. Charles		91	93	−2.15%
811	Humphreys	Village	Sullivan		88	89	−1.12%
812	Dover	Town	Lafayette		86	83	+3.61%
813	Whitewater	Town	Cape Girardeau		86	88	−2.27%
814	Rutledge	Town	Scotland		85	86	−1.16%
815	Clifton Hill	City	Randolph		84	88	−4.55%
816	De Witt	City	Carroll		83	83	0.00%
817	Baldwin Park	Village	Cass		82	85	−3.53%
818	Pascola	Village	Pemiscot		82	87	−5.75%
819	Aullville	Village	Lafayette		81	77	+5.19%
820	Sumner	Town	Chariton		81	78	+3.85%
821	Arrow Point	Village	Barry		80	75	+6.67%
822	Foster	Village	Bates		80	76	+5.26%
823	McKittrick	Town	Montgomery		80	77	+3.90%
824	Ionia	Town	Benton	Pettis	79	71	+11.27%
825	Gunn City	Village	Cass		78	80	−2.50%
826	Millard	Village	Adair		78	79	−1.27%
827	Moundville	Town	Vernon		77	78	−1.28%
828	Weatherby	Town	DeKalb		77	80	−3.75%
829	Mount Moriah	Town	Harrison		76	75	+1.33%
830	Riverview Estates	Village	Cass		76	78	−2.56%
831	Old Appleton	Town	Cape Girardeau		75	73	+2.74%
832	Waco	City	Jasper		75	72	+4.17%
833	Wilson City	Village	Mississippi		75	77	−2.60%
834	Revere	Town	Clark		73	76	−3.95%
835	Brumley	Town	Miller		72	69	+4.35%
836	Levasy	City	Jackson		72	77	−6.49%
837	Ritchey	Town	Newton		72	66	+9.09%
838	Tallapoosa	City	New Madrid		72	78	−7.69%
839	Big Lake	Village	Holt		71	65	+9.23%
840	Country Life Acres	Village	St. Louis		71	72	−1.39%
841	Gibbs	Village	Adair		71	70	+1.43%
842	Jameson	Town	Daviess		71	73	−2.74%
843	Truxton	Village	Lincoln		71	59	+20.34%
844	Brownington	Town	Henry		70	71	−1.41%
845	Merwin	Village	Bates		70	69	+1.45%
846	Aldrich	Village	Polk		69	76	−9.21%
847	Luray	Village	Clark		69	73	−5.48%
848	Darlington	Village	Gentry		68	66	+3.03%
849	Pierpont	Village	Boone		68	64	+6.25%
850	Franklin	City	Howard		67	70	−4.29%
851	Homestown	City	Pemiscot		67	73	−8.22%
852	Glen Allen	Town	Bollinger		66	57	+15.79%
853	Mount Leonard	Town	Saline		65	65	0.00%
854	Paynesville	Village	Pike		65	60	+8.33%
855	Vandiver	Village	Audrain		64	63	+1.59%
856	Bragg City	Town	Pemiscot		63	72	−12.50%
857	South Gorin	Town	Scotland		63	62	+1.61%
858	Whiteside	Village	Lincoln		63	52	+21.15%
859	Milo	Village	Vernon		62	57	+8.77%
860	Rothville	Village	Chariton		62	63	−1.59%
861	Unity Village	Village	Jackson		62	66	−6.06%
862	Worth	Village	Worth		62	65	−4.62%
863	Gentry	Village	Gentry		59	56	+5.36%
864	Harris	Town	Sullivan		59	65	−9.23%
865	Newark	Village	Knox		58	54	+7.41%
866	Randolph	Village	Clay		58	57	+1.75%
867	Tightwad	Village	Henry		58	58	0.00%
868	Watson	Village	Atchison		58	61	−4.92%
869	Arrow Rock	Town	Saline		57	60	−5.00%
870	Guilford	Town	Nodaway		57	60	−5.00%
871	Worthington	Village	Putnam		57	47	+21.28%
872	Dennis Acres	Village	Newton		55	47	+17.02%
873	Leonard	Village	Shelby		55	57	−3.51%
874	Lucerne	Village	Putnam		55	57	−3.51%
875	Livonia	Village	Putnam		54	52	+3.85%
876	Arkoe	Town	Nodaway		52	56	−7.14%
877	Clyde	Village	Nodaway		52	55	−5.45%
878	Elmer	City	Macon		51	51	0.00%
879	Grand Pass	Village	Saline		50	49	+2.04%
880	Penermon	Village	Stoddard		49	51	−3.92%
881	Tindall	Town	Grundy		49	46	+6.52%
882	Allendale	Village	Worth		48	48	0.00%
883	Brimson	Village	Grundy		48	50	−4.00%
884	Ethel	Town	Macon		47	41	+14.63%
885	Coney Island	Village	Stone		46	47	−2.13%
886	Pollock	Village	Sullivan		45	46	−2.17%
887	Rea	City	Andrew		45	46	−2.17%
888	Richards	Town	Vernon		45	43	+4.65%
889	Iatan	Village	Platte		44	39	+12.82%
890	Bagnell	Town	Miller		43	43	0.00%
891	Cliff Village	Village	Newton		43	40	+7.50%
892	Umber View Heights	Village	Cedar		43	41	+4.88%
893	Commerce	Village	Scott		42	45	−6.67%
894	Powersville	Village	Putnam		42	42	0.00%
895	Deerfield	Village	Vernon		41	40	+2.50%
896	Elmira	Village	Ray		40	39	+2.56%
897	Lock Springs	Village	Daviess		40	40	0.00%
898	Rives	Town	Dunklin		40	42	−4.76%
899	Arcola	Village	Dade		39	37	+5.41%
900	St. Cloud	Village	Crawford		39	43	−9.30%
901	Stoutsville	Village	Monroe		39	37	+5.41%
902	Triplett	City	Chariton		39	33	+18.18%
903	Catron	Town	New Madrid		37	41	−9.76%
904	Vista	Village	St. Clair		37	36	+2.78%
905	Ginger Blue	Village	McDonald		34	37	−8.11%
906	Denver	Village	Worth		32	32	0.00%
907	Lupus	Town	Moniteau		31	28	+10.71%
908	Harwood	Village	Vernon		30	29	+3.45%
909	Huntsdale	Town	Boone		30	29	+3.45%
910	Pendleton	Village	Warren		30	34	−11.76%
911	Passaic	Town	Bates		29	26	+11.54%
912	Milford	Village	Barton		27	24	+12.50%
913	Wooldridge	Village	Cooper		27	28	−3.57%
914	Amity	Town	DeKalb		25	26	−3.85%
915	Arbela	Town	Scotland		23	24	−4.17%
916	Osgood	Village	Sullivan		23	24	−4.17%
917	South Gifford	Village	Macon		23	22	+4.55%
918	Granger	Village	Scotland		22	22	0.00%
919	North Lilbourn	Village	New Madrid		22	22	0.00%
920	Evergreen	Village	Laclede		21	20	+5.00%
921	Fortescue	Town	Holt		21	21	0.00%
922	Metz	Town	Vernon		17	22	−22.73%
923	Charmwood	Town	Franklin		16	17	−5.88%
924	Gerster	Town	St. Clair		16	21	−23.81%
925	McBaine	Town	Boone		16	17	−5.88%
926	South Lineville	Town	Mercer		14	13	+7.69%
927	Annada	Village	Pike		13	14	−7.14%
928	Irena	Village	Worth		13	14	−7.14%
929	Stotesbury	Town	Vernon		11	12	−8.33%
930	Champ	Village	St. Louis		9	10	−10.00%
931	Dalton	Town	Chariton		8	7	+14.29%
932	Three Creeks	Village	Warren		6	8	−25.00%
933	River Bend	Village	Jackson		5	3	+66.67%
934	Bigelow	Village	Holt		4	5	−20.00%
935	Friedenswald	Village	Camden		3	4	−25.00%
936	Corning	Town	Holt		0	3	−100.00%
Total of 936 municipalities			115 Counties		6,270,541	6,154,913	1.88%

== See also ==
- List of census-designated places in Missouri
