= Joplin metropolitan area =

Joplin, Missouri
- Metropolitan statistical area
- Joplin, MO-KS, Metropolitan Statistical Area
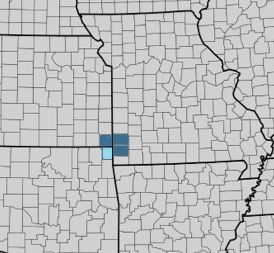
- Joplin-Miami, MO-OK-KS CSA
- Country: United States
- State(s): Missouri; Kansas; Oklahoma
- Largest city: Joplin
- Other cities: Carthage; Miami; Webb City; Neosho; Carl Junction; Baxter Springs; Columbus; Galena

Area
  - Total: 1,859 sq mi (4,810 km^{2})

Population (2025)
  - Total: 208,796
  - Rank: 240th (US)
  - Combined Statistical Area (CSA): 239,234
- Time zone: Central Standard Time (CST)
- Area codes: 417 (Missouri); 620 (Kansas); 918 (Oklahoma)

The Joplin, Missouri-Kansas, Metropolitan Statistical Area (MSA), as defined by the United States Census Bureau, is an area consisting of Jasper, Newton, and Cherokee counties in southwest Missouri and southeast Kansas anchored by the city of Joplin. The estimated 2024 population of the Joplin, MO-KS (MSA) is 207,131. As of March 2023, The U.S. Census Bureau MSA delineation report added Cherokee County, Kansas to the Joplin, MO MSA making it the Joplin, MO-KS MSA.

The Joplin–Miami, MO–KS-OK, Combined Statistical Area (CSA) includes the Miami, Oklahoma micropolitan statistical area, As of 2024, the Joplin-Miami (CSA) estimated population is 237,535.

== CSA Counties ==
Joplin-Miami, MO-KS-OK Combined Statistical Area
County	2025 Census Estimate	2020 Census	2010 Census	Change
Jasper County	127,428	122,761	117,404	+4.56%
Newton County	62,263	58,648	58,114	+0.92%
Ottawa County	30,404	30,285	31,848	−4.91%
Cherokee County	19,105	19,362	21,603	−10.37%
Total	239,234	231,130	207,366	+11.46%

=== Joplin, MO-KS Metropolitan area ===
- Jasper
- Newton
- Cherokee (Added in to MSA in 2023)

=== Miami, OK Micropolitan area ===
- Ottawa

== Communities ==
Historical population
Census	Pop.	Note	%±
1970	112,746		—
1980	127,515		13.1%
1990	135,905		6.6%
2000	157,322		15.8%
2010	175,518		11.6%
2020	200,908		14.5%
2025 (est.)	208,796		3.9%
U.S. Decennial Census; 2024 Estimate

Historical population
Census	Pop.	Note	%±
2010	207,366		—
2020	231,130		11.5%
2025 (est.)	239,234		3.5%
U.S. Decennial Census; 2024 Estimate

Communities are categorized based on their populations from the 2025 US Population Estimates.

=== Anchor cities of Joplin-Miami CSA ===
- Joplin, Missouri (Principal city) pop: 53,930
- Miami, Oklahoma pop: 12,893
  (County Seat of Ottawa County)

=== Places with 5,000 to 20,000 inhabitants ===
- Carthage, MO pop: 15,895
  (County Seat of Jasper County)
- Neosho, MO pop: 14,078
  (County Seat of Newton County)
- Webb City, MO pop: 13,459
- Carl Junction, MO pop: 8,484

=== Places with 1,000 to 4,999 inhabitants ===
- Baxter Springs, KS pop: 3,823
- Oronogo, MO pop: 3,204
- Columbus, KS pop: 2,866
  (County Seat of Cherokee County)
- Galena, KS pop: 2,788
- Duquesne, MO Pop: 2,345
- Seneca, MO pop: 2,343
- Commerce, OK pop: 2,260
- Granby, MO pop: 2,113
- Duenweg, MO pop: 2,100
- Carterville, MO pop: 1,869
- Sarcoxie, MO pop: 1,429
- Fairland, OK pop: 1,100
- Loma Linda, MO pop: 1,009

=== Places with 500 to 999 inhabitants ===
- Diamond, MO pop: 906
- Jasper, MO pop: 870
- Quapaw, OK pop: 838
- Airport Drive, MO pop: 822
- Afton, OK pop: 753
- Leawood, MO pop: 643
- Alba, MO pop: 589
- Weir, KS pop: 563

=== Places with less than 500 inhabitants ===
- Wyandotte, OK pop: 488
- Fairview, MO pop: 432
- Shoal Creek Drive, MO pop: 381
- Scammon, KS pop: 366
- Saginaw, MO pop: 333
- Purcell, MO pop: 320
- North Miami, OK pop: 294
- Carytown, MO pop: 293
- Fidelity, MO pop: 235
- Neck City, MO pop: 234
- Newtonia, MO pop: 215
- Asbury, MO pop: 195
- Stella, MO pop: 170
- Redings Mill, MO pop: 159
- West Mineral, KS pop: 149
- La Russell, MO pop: 140
- Peoria, OK pop: 131
- Stark City, MO pop: 131
- Grand Falls Plaza, MO pop: 108
- Shoal Creek Estates, MO pop: 108
- Wentworth, MO pop: 104
- Avilla, MO pop: 102
- Brooklyn Heights, MO pop: 100
- Reeds, MO pop: 91
- Roseland, KS pop: 75
- Waco, MO pop: 75
- Ritchey, MO pop: 72
- Dennis Acres, MO pop: 55
- Cliff Village, MO pop: 43

=== Census Designated Places ===
- Riverton, KS pop: 771
- Lowell, KS pop: 244
- Crestline, KS pop: 116
- Dotyville, OK pop: 101
- Hallowell, KS pop: 101
- Narcissa, OK pop: 92

=== Unincorporated places ===
- Dudenville
- Hornet
- Kendricktown
- Maxville
- Racine
- Scotland
- Spring City
- Tipton Ford
- Wanda

=== Ghost towns ===
- Picher, OK (pop: 9726 at its peak in 1920)
- Cardin, OK (pop: 2640 at its peak in 1920)
- Monark Springs, MO
- Treece, KS pop: 137

== Education ==
The Joplin, MO-KS-OK Combined Statistical Area (CSA) is served by many different school districts and higher education institutions such as the following:
Missouri School Districts

- Avilla R-13
- Carl Junction R-1
- Carthage R-9
- Diamond R-4
- East Newton R-6
- Jasper County R-5
- Joplin Catholic Schools
- Joplin R-8
- Neosho R-5
- Sarcoxie R-2
- Seneca R-7
- Webb City R-7
- Westview C-6

Colleges and Universities

- Crowder College
- Kansas City University - Joplin
- Missouri Southern State University
- Northeastern Oklahoma A&M College
- Ozark Christian College
- Pittsburg State University- Pittsburg, KS* *Outside of Joplin, MO-KS-OK CSA

Kansas School Districts

- Baxter Springs USD 508
- Columbus USD 493
- Galena USD 499
- Riverton USD 404

Oklahoma School Districts

- Afton Public Schools
- Bluejacket Public School
- Cleora Public Schools
- Commerce Public Schools
- Fairland Public Schools
- Miami Public Schools
- Quapaw Public Schools
- Turkey Ford Public Schools
- Wyandotte Public Schools

== Demographics (Joplin, MO-KS Metropolitan Statistical Area) ==
As of the census of 2020, there were 204,787 people, 64,286 households, and 44,270 families residing within the MSA. The racial makeup of the MSA was 93.5% White, 1.5% African American, 1.6% Native American, 1.0% Asian, 0.2% Pacific Islander, 1.45% from other races, and 2.23% from two or more races. Hispanic or Latino of any race were 5.2% of the population. For every 100 females there are 95.3 males.

The median income for a household in the MSA was $37,158, and the median income for a family was $44,564. Males had a median income of $29,315 versus $20,883 for females.

== See also ==
- Missouri census statistical areas
- List of cities in Missouri
- List of villages in Missouri
