= Spring City =

Spring City may refer to the name of several places, such as:

- Spring City, Abaco, in the Bahamas
- Spring City, Missouri
- Spring City, Pennsylvania
- Spring City, Tennessee
- Spring City, Utah
