= Kendricktown, Missouri =

Unincorporated community in Missouri, U.S.

Coordinates: 37°11′41″N 94°18′36″W

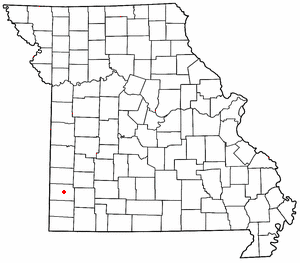

Kendricktown is an unincorporated community in Jasper County, Missouri, United States. It is located on Missouri Supplemental Route V, immediately north of the city limits of Carthage and just south of U.S. Route 71. The main road through town is a former alignment of US 71.

The community is part of the Joplin, Missouri Metropolitan Statistical Area.

The Kendricktown area was first settled before the American Civil War, by one of the first pioneers in Jasper County, J. D. Kendrick. The local school board approved $5,000 in bonds to fund the construction of a new school building for Kendricktown in 1912, with the school planned to be opened in December of that year. Gambling and bootlegging were reported to be common in the community in 1923. In 1950, Kendricktown was described as "an integral part of Carthage" in a 1950 article in the Carthage Evening Press which opined that it was unfortunate that the unincorporated area could not be annexed by Carthage so that it could be connected to the Carthage city water system.

The community is located in a floodplain and has repeatedly flooded in the 21st century. Jasper County considered using federal disaster relief funding to buy out the residences and other properties in Kendricktown in 2007, 2008, 2009, and after 2015 flooding.
