= Joplin High School =

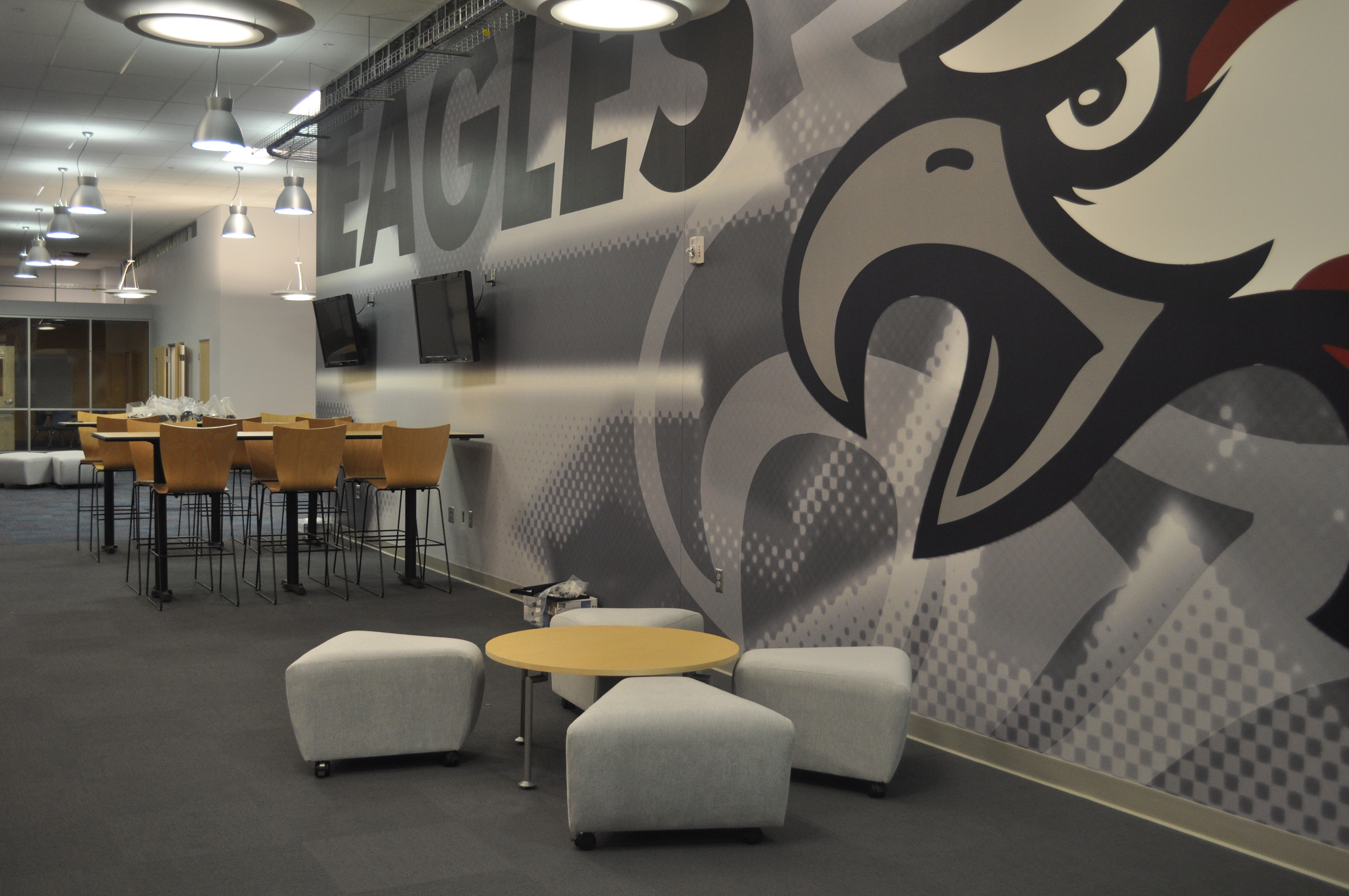
- One of the school's temporary facilities following the 2011 Joplin tornado

Location
- 2104 Indiana Avenue; Joplin, Missouri 64804; United States; 37.0680°N 94.5057°W

Information
- Type: Public
- Opened: August 1885
- School district: Joplin School District
- CEEB code: 261585
- Teaching staff: 124.55 (FTE)
- Grades: 9–12
- Enrollment: 2,288 (2024–2025)
- Student to teacher ratio: 18.37
- Campus size: 39.27 acres (15.89 ha)
- Campus type: Suburban
- Colors: Red; Silver; Navy
- Athletics conference: Central Ozark Conference
- Team name: Eagles
- Newspaper: SpyGlass
- Website: jhs.joplinschools.org

Joplin High School is a public high school located in Joplin, Missouri, United States, founded in 1885. The school serves students in grades 9 through 12 and is the only traditional high school in the Joplin School District.

== History ==
In 1885, Joplin High School began operation. The original site was expanded in 1892 to accommodate more students, and in 1897, students moved to a new site due to continued growth. In 1911, the students built a biplane and on October 11, 1911 Harold Robinson piloted the plane and it crashed, killing a bystander, James Kinney. A successful 1915 referendum allocated $350,000 for a new school, which opened in January 1918. In 1955, the new building was already too small to hold all the students, and a new $2.5 million bond was approved. When this proved to be too small of an amount of funding, voters rejected two additional bonds, leading to a student walk-out in 1957 in support of new facilities. A bond in early 1958 was approved to finish construction of the school, and classes commenced in the latest building that fall. Joplin was racially integrated without incident.

Later, in 1968, Joplin High School split into two high schools, one named Parkwood at 2104 Indiana Avenue and the other was named Memorial High School at 310 W. 8th Street. Joplin had two public high schools for the next 17 years until the Baby Boom enrollment bubble burst, leading to the consolidation of the two back into Joplin High School.

Extensive renovations completed in 2003, and a television studio was completed in 2005.

=== 2011 tornado ===
The 2011 Joplin tornado that killed 161 people in Joplin extensively damaged the high school and Franklin Tech. The high school's graduation ceremonies had taken place that afternoon about three miles away on the Missouri Southern State University campus shortly before the tornado struck. In the weeks after the tornado, it was determined that the campus would need to be completely rebuilt. Planning for a temporary school began four days after the May 22 tornado. School officials announced in June 2011 that juniors and seniors in the 2011–12 class would attend classes in a section of Northpark Mall in the renovated former Shopko location, while freshmen and sophomores held classes at the former Memorial High School building. Classes began as scheduled on August 17, 2011.

On May 20, 2012, President Barack Obama addressed the JHS graduating class's commencement ceremony, held almost one year to the day of the deadly tornado.

=== Temporary campus and facilities ===
From August 2011 to May 2014 the school was split between a renovated former Shopko store at Northpark Mall and a former high school. The design of this temporary facility was awarded the Council of Educational Facilities Planners International's 2012 James D. MacConnell Award for excellence in school design.

On May 22, 2012, the groundbreaking ceremony was held marking the start of construction of the new permanent replacement school. Construction costs for the new 488,000 plus-square-foot facility designed by Corner Greer Associates of Joplin and the Overland Park, Kansas firm DLR Group, which includes a state of the art vocational technical center, are expected to be $120 million.

After three years in temporary campuses as a result of the 2011 tornado, Joplin High School opened at 2104 Indiana Ave. on September 2, 2014.

== Communities zoned to the high school ==
- Joplin (the majority)
- Cliff Village
- Dennis Acres
- Duenweg (almost all)
- Duquesne
- Grand Falls Plaza
- Leawood
- Redings Mill
- Saginaw
- Shoal Creek Drive
- Shoal Creek Estates
- Webb City (partial)

== Athletics and co-curricular activities ==
JHS athletic teams are nicknamed the Eagles and compete in the Central Ozark Conference, joining the conference in 2018 after previously being a member of the Ozark Conference.

State Championships
Sport	Year(s)
Baseball	1955, 1959, 2001
Basketball (boys)	1939, 1950, 1955, 1967
Golf (boys)	1946, 1955, 1956

JHS fields two competitive show choirs, the mixed-gender "Sound Dimension" and the all-female "Touch of Class". It previously fielded another mixed-gender group, "New Expressions", and another all-female group, "Glitz". The program also hosts an annual competition.

== Noted alumni ==
- Robert Cummings, actor
- Isaiah Davis, professional football running back for the New York Jets.
- Jacqueline Jakway, neuroscientist
- Steve Luebber, baseball player
- Jamie McMurray, racing driver
