= Wanda, Missouri =

Wanda
- Unincorporated community
- Location within the state of Missouri
- Coordinates: 36°48′38″N 94°11′59″W
- Country: United States
- State: Missouri
- County: Newton
- Elevation: 1,178 ft (359 m)
- Time zone: UTC-6 (Central (CST))
  - Summer (DST): UTC-5 (CDT)

Wanda is an unincorporated community in Newton County, Missouri, United States. It lies along Missouri State Route O, between the towns of Stark City and Stella.

The community is part of the Joplin, Missouri Metropolitan Statistical Area.

A post office Wanda was established in 1886, and remained in operation until 1908. The identity of the namesake Wanda is unknown. Other names include Wando and Old Harmony.
