= Maxville, Missouri =

Extinct hamlet in Missouri, U.S.

Coordinates: 37.198°N 94.268°W

Maxville is a former town on U.S. Route 66, approximately two miles (3 km) east of Carthage in Jasper County, Missouri, United States. The community is part of the Joplin, Missouri Metropolitan Statistical Area.
