= Jacqueline Jakway =

Neuroscientist

- Born: Jacqueline Halle Sinks; 1928; Puerto Rico
- Died: 25 March 2008 (aged 79–80)
- Education: Park College (BA) University of Kansas (PhD)
- Occupations: Professor of anatomy and cell biology
- Employer: State University of New York

Jacqueline Halle Sinks Jakway (1928 – 25 March 2008) was a professor of anatomy and cell biology.

== Background ==
Jakway was born Jacqueline Halle Sinks in 1928 in Puerto Rico, later moving to Missouri. Jakway attended Joplin High School in 1946, followed by attending Park College in Parkville, earning a BA in biology in 1950, and then in 1958 pursued a PhD in anatomy from the University of Kansas. Jakway worked her postdoc at the University of Nebraska becoming an assistant professor of anatomy at the University of Southern California in 1961. Jakway then moved to New York and taught gross anatomy and neuroanatomy as an associate professor of anatomy and cell biology at the State University of New York Downstate Medical College from 1967 to 2008. She has been noted by a former student for her impact on Occupational Therapy students in need of high-quality Anatomy courses at Downstate Medical Center in Brooklyn, New York, as well as for her role in designing the curriculum in collaboration with Occupational Therapy faculty members.

== Publications ==
Jakway's PhD was focused on the genetic inheritance patterns in Guinea pigs and she produced several publications during this period, including "An Inherited Spermatogenic Hypoplasia in the Guinea Pig", "The inheritance of patterns of sexual behaviour in female guinea pigs", and "Inheritance of patterns of mating behaviour in the male guinea pig". Jakway then went on to study the anatomy of the eye and publish "A Perspective on the Fundamental Retinal Projections of Vertebrates" and "Retinal Projections in the Tiger Salamander, Ambystoma tigrinum".
