= Leawood, Missouri =

- Village
- Location of Leawood, Missouri
- Coordinates: 37°02′02″N 94°30′03″W
- Country: United States
- State: Missouri
- County: Newton

Area
  - Total: 1.24 sq mi (3.22 km^{2})
  - Land: 1.23 sq mi (3.19 km^{2})
  - Water: 0.012 sq mi (0.03 km^{2})
- Elevation: 984 ft (300 m)

Population (2020)
  - Total: 620
  - Density: 502.6/sq mi (194.07/km^{2})
- Time zone: UTC-6 (Central (CST))
  - Summer (DST): UTC-5 (CDT)
- ZIP code: 64804
- Area code: 417
- FIPS code: 29-41132
- GNIS feature ID: 2398408
- Website: www.leawoodvillage.com

Leawood is a village in Newton County, Missouri, United States. As of the 2020 census, Leawood had a population of 620. It is part of the Joplin, Missouri Metropolitan Statistical Area.

== Geography ==
According to the United States Census Bureau, the village has a total area of 1.31 square miles (3.39 km^{2}), of which 1.30 square miles (3.37 km^{2}) is land and 0.01 square miles (0.03 km^{2}) is water.

== Demographics ==
Historical population
Census	Pop.	Note	%±
1960	152		—
1970	174		14.5%
1980	631		262.6%
1990	736		16.6%
2000	904		22.8%
2010	682		−24.6%
2020	620		−9.1%
U.S. Decennial Census

=== 2010 census ===
As of the census of 2010, there were 682 people, 259 households, and 202 families living in the village. The population density was 524.6 inhabitants per square mile (202.5/km^{2}). There were 275 housing units at an average density of 211.5 per square mile (81.7/km^{2}). The racial makeup of the village was 94.9% White, 0.6% African American, 1.3% Native American, 1.2% Asian, and 2.1% from two or more races. Hispanic or Latino of any race were 1.8% of the population.

There were 259 households, of which 30.9% had children under the age of 18 living with them, 66.8% were married couples living together, 8.9% had a female householder with no husband present, 2.3% had a male householder with no wife present, and 22.0% were non-families. 17.8% of all households were made up of individuals, and 8.9% had someone living alone who was 65 years of age or older. The average household size was 2.63 and the average family size was 2.92.

The median age in the village was 44.8 years. 22.4% of residents were under the age of 18; 6.8% were between the ages of 18 and 24; 21% were from 25 to 44; 34.4% were from 45 to 64; and 15.5% were 65 years of age or older. The gender makeup of the village was 50.0% male and 50.0% female.

=== 2000 census ===
As of the census of 2000, there were 904 people, 318 households, and 274 families living in the village. The population density was 622.5 inhabitants per square mile (240.3/km^{2}). There were 336 housing units at an average density of 231.4 per square mile (89.3/km^{2}). The racial makeup of the village was 93.69% White, 0.55% African American, 0.33% Native American, 1.99% Asian, 1.11% from other races, and 2.32% from two or more races. Hispanic or Latino of any race were 2.21% of the population.

There were 318 households, out of which 39.6% had children under the age of 18 living with them, 78.3% were married couples living together, 6.3% had a female householder with no husband present, and 13.8% were non-families. 11.0% of all households were made up of individuals, and 4.7% had someone living alone who was 65 years of age or older. The average household size was 2.83 and the average family size was 3.04.

In the village, the population was spread out, with 27.5% under the age of 18, 8.4% from 18 to 24, 23.8% from 25 to 44, 30.9% from 45 to 64, and 9.4% who were 65 years of age or older. The median age was 40 years. For every 100 females, there were 89.9 males. For every 100 females age 18 and over, there were 93.8 males.

The median income for a household in the village was $62,250, and the median income for a family was $68,214. Males had a median income of $48,333 versus $21,875 for females. The per capita income for the village was $36,196. About 5.0% of families and 8.4% of the population were below the poverty line, including 10.9% of those under age 18 and 3.9% of those age 65 or over.

== Education ==
The school district is Joplin School District. Zoned schools include: Stapleton Elementary School and South Middle School, with all school district residents zoned to Joplin High School.
