= Shoal Creek Estates, Missouri =

- Village
- Location of Shoal Creek Estates, Missouri
- Coordinates: 37°01′02″N 94°29′36″W
- Country: United States
- State: Missouri
- County: Newton

Area
  - Total: 0.12 sq mi (0.30 km^{2})
  - Land: 0.12 sq mi (0.30 km^{2})
  - Water: 0 sq mi (0.00 km^{2})
- Elevation: 1,027 ft (313 m)

Population (2020)
  - Total: 107
  - Density: 937.3/sq mi (361.89/km^{2})
- Time zone: UTC-6 (Central (CST))
  - Summer (DST): UTC-5 (CDT)
- FIPS code: 29-67632
- GNIS feature ID: 2397660

Shoal Creek Estates is a village in Newton County, Missouri, United States. As of the 2020 census, Shoal Creek Estates had a population of 107. It is part of the Joplin, Missouri Metropolitan Statistical Area.

== Geography ==
Shoal Creek Estates is located at 37°1′7″N 94°29′41″W (37.018662, -94.494721).

According to the United States Census Bureau, the village has a total area of 0.11 square miles (0.28 km^{2}), all land.

== Demographics ==
Historical population
Census	Pop.	Note	%±
1980	89		—
1990	21		−76.4%
2000	51		142.9%
2010	96		88.2%
2020	107		11.5%
U.S. Decennial Census

=== 2010 census ===
As of the census of 2010, there were 96 people, 35 households, and 29 families living in the village. The population density was 872.7 inhabitants per square mile (337.0/km^{2}). There were 35 housing units at an average density of 318.2 per square mile (122.9/km^{2}). The racial makeup of the village was 95.8% White, 2.1% African American, and 2.1% from two or more races. Hispanic or Latino of any race were 5.2% of the population.

There were 35 households, of which 37.1% had children under the age of 18 living with them, 71.4% were married couples living together, 2.9% had a female householder with no husband present, 8.6% had a male householder with no wife present, and 17.1% were non-families. 14.3% of all households were made up of individuals, and 2.9% had someone living alone who was 65 years of age or older. The average household size was 2.74 and the average family size was 3.00.

The median age in the village was 43 years. 26% of residents were under the age of 18; 2.1% were between the ages of 18 and 24; 27.1% were from 25 to 44; 28.2% were from 45 to 64; and 16.7% were 65 years of age or older. The gender makeup of the village was 51.0% male and 49.0% female.

=== 2000 census ===
At the 2000 census, there were 51 people, 19 households and 17 families living in the town. The population density was 489.1 inhabitants per square mile (188.8/km^{2}). There were 21 housing units at an average density of 201.4 per square mile (77.8/km^{2}). The racial makeup of the town was 92.16% White, 1.96% Native American, and 5.88% from two or more races. Hispanic or Latino of any race were 3.92% of the population.

There were 19 households, of which 42.1% had children under the age of 18 living with them, 89.5% were married couples living together, and 5.3% were non-families. No households were made up of individuals, and none had someone living alone who was 65 years of age or older. The average household size was 2.68 and the average family size was 2.67.

Age distribution was 25.5% under the age of 18, 33.3% from 25 to 44, 19.6% from 45 to 64, and 21.6% who were 65 years of age or older. The median age was 39 years. For every 100 females, there were 104.0 males. For every 100 females age 18 and over, there were 100.0 males.

The median household income was $77,394, and the median family income was $101,585. Males had a median income of $85,000 versus $28,125 for females. The per capita income for the town was $41,970. None of the population and none of the families were below the poverty line.

== Education ==
The school district is Joplin School District. Zoned schools include: Stapleton Elementary School and South Middle School, with all school district residents zoned to Joplin High School.
