= Duquesne, Missouri =

- City
- Location of Duquesne, Missouri
- Coordinates: 37°04′15″N 94°27′24″W
- Country: United States
- State: Missouri
- County: Jasper

Government
  - Mayor: Bill Sherman

Area
  - Total: 1.95 sq mi (5.04 km^{2})
  - Land: 1.95 sq mi (5.04 km^{2})
  - Water: 0 sq mi (0.00 km^{2})
- Elevation: 1,093 ft (333 m)

Population (2020)
  - Total: 2,159
  - Density: 1,109.9/sq mi (428.52/km^{2})
- Time zone: UTC-6 (Central (CST))
  - Summer (DST): UTC-5 (CDT)
- ZIP code: 64801, 64804
- Area code: 417
- FIPS code: 29-20512
- GNIS feature ID: 2398761
- Website: duquesnemo.org

Duquesne (/duːˈkeɪn/ doo-KAYN) is a Fourth-Class City in Jasper County, Missouri, United States. The population was 2,159 at the 2020 census. It is part of the Joplin, Missouri Metropolitan Statistical Area.

== Geography ==
Duquesne is located at 37°4′28″N 94°27′46″W (37.074560, -94.462770).

According to the United States Census Bureau, the city has a total area of 1.85 square miles (4.79 km^{2}), all land.

== Demographics ==
Historical population
Census	Pop.	Note	%±
1960	699		—
1970	738		5.6%
1980	1,252		69.6%
1990	1,229		−1.8%
2000	1,640		33.4%
2010	1,763		7.5%
2020	2,159		22.5%
U.S. Decennial Census

Duquesne had been a village since its inception, but in 2006 Duquesne successfully applied for status as a Fourth-Class City.

Sixty to seventy percent of the structures of Duquesne were destroyed by the May 22, 2011 tornado with thirty percent of Joplin being destroyed.

=== 2010 census ===
As of the census of 2010, there were 1,763 people, 781 households, and 493 families living in the city. The population density was 953.0 inhabitants per square mile (368.0/km^{2}). There were 856 housing units at an average density of 462.7 per square mile (178.6/km^{2}). The racial makeup of the city was 91.9% White, 1.4% African American, 1.6% Native American, 1.7% Asian, 0.1% Pacific Islander, 0.9% from other races, and 2.3% from two or more races. Hispanic or Latino of any race were 3.3% of the population.

There were 781 households, of which 27.0% had children under the age of 18 living with them, 46.4% were married couples living together, 11.8% had a female householder with no husband present, 5.0% had a male householder with no wife present, and 36.9% were non-families. 30.5% of all households were made up of individuals, and 7.9% had someone living alone who was 65 years of age or older. The average household size was 2.26 and the average family size was 2.74.

The median age in the city was 39.6 years. 20.8% of residents were under the age of 18; 11.8% were between the ages of 18 and 24; 24.1% were from 25 to 44; 27.7% were from 45 to 64; and 15.8% were 65 years of age or older. The gender makeup of the city was 48.8% male and 51.2% female.

=== 2000 census ===
As of the census of 2000, there were 1,640 people, 672 households, and 475 families living in the village. The population density was 874.4 inhabitants per square mile (337.6/km^{2}). There were 706 housing units at an average density of 376.4 per square mile (145.3/km^{2}). The racial makeup of the Village was 93.23% White, 0.67% African American, 2.32% Native American, 1.59% Asian, 0.06% from other races, and 2.13% from two or more races. Hispanic or Latino of any race were 1.52% of the population.

There were 672 households, out of which 27.4% had children under the age of 18 living with them, 56.7% were married couples living together, 10.1% had a female householder with no husband present, and 29.3% were non-families. 23.1% of all households were made up of individuals, and 8.2% had someone living alone who was 65 years of age or older. The average household size was 2.40 and the average family size was 2.78.

In the village the population was spread out, with 22.1% under the age of 18, 9.5% from 18 to 24, 28.3% from 25 to 44, 26.0% from 45 to 64, and 14.1% who were 65 years of age or older. The median age was 38 years. For every 100 females, there were 90.0 males. For every 100 females age 18 and over, there were 91.5 males.

The median income for a household in the village was $37,188, and the median income for a family was $41,406. Males had a median income of $30,551 versus $22,650 for females. The per capita income for the village was $16,815. About 5.9% of families and 7.7% of the population were below the poverty line, including 11.4% of those under age 18 and 6.0% of those age 65 or over.

== Education ==
The school district is Joplin School District.

The majority of Duquesne residents are zoned to Soaring Heights Elementary School while sections west of Duquesne Road and north of 7th Street are zoned to McKinley Elementary School. Residents of both of those elementary zones are assigned to East Middle School, and all school district residents are zoned to Joplin High School.
