= Cliff Village, Missouri =

- Village
- Location of Cliff Village, Missouri
- Coordinates: 37°01′31″N 94°31′02″W
- Country: United States
- State: Missouri
- County: Newton

Area
  - Total: 0.039 sq mi (0.10 km^{2})
  - Land: 0.039 sq mi (0.10 km^{2})
  - Water: 0 sq mi (0.00 km^{2})
- Elevation: 955 ft (291 m)

Population (2020)
  - Total: 40
  - Density: 994.6/sq mi (384.01/km^{2})
- Time zone: UTC-6 (Central (CST))
  - Summer (DST): UTC-5 (CDT)
- FIPS code: 29-14806
- GNIS feature ID: 2397646

Cliff Village is a village in Newton County, Missouri, United States. As of the 2020 census, Cliff Village had a population of 40. It is part of the Joplin metropolitan area.

== Geography ==
Cliff Village is located at 37°1′31″N 94°31′2″W (37.025384, -94.517125).

According to the United States Census Bureau, the village has a total area of 0.04 square miles (0.10 km^{2}), all land.

== Demographics ==
Historical population
| Census | Pop. | Note | %± |
|---|---|---|---|
| 1960 | 35 | | — |
| 1970 | 39 | | 11.4% |
| 1980 | 24 | | −38.5% |
| 1990 | 19 | | −20.8% |
| 2000 | 33 | | 73.7% |
| 2010 | 40 | | 21.2% |
| 2020 | 40 | | 0.0% |
U.S. Decennial Census

=== 2010 census ===
As of the census of 2010, there were 40 people, 16 households, and 13 families living in the village. The population density was 1,000.0 inhabitants per square mile (386.1/km^{2}). There were 17 housing units at an average density of 425.0 per square mile (164.1/km^{2}). The racial makeup of the village was 87.5% White, 7.5% Native American, and 5.0% from two or more races.

There were 16 households, of which 37.5% had children under the age of 18 living with them, 75.0% were married couples living together, 6.3% had a male householder with no wife present, and 18.8% were non-families. 12.5% of all households were made up of individuals, and 6.3% had someone living alone who was 65 years of age or older. The average household size was 2.50 and the average family size was 2.69.

The median age in the village was 32 years. 25% of residents were under the age of 18; 5% were between the ages of 18 and 24; 40% were from 25 to 44; 17.5% were from 45 to 64; and 12.5% were 65 years of age or older. The gender makeup of the village was 55.0% male and 45.0% female.

=== 2000 census ===
As of the census of 2000, there were 33 people, 15 households, and 12 families living in the village. The population density was 824.2 inhabitants per square mile (318.2/km^{2}). There were 17 housing units at an average density of 424.6 per square mile (163.9/km^{2}). The racial makeup of the village was 100.00% White.

There were 15 households, out of which 13.3% had children under the age of 18 living with them, 60.0% were married couples living together, 6.7% had a female householder with no husband present, and 20.0% were non-families. 20.0% of all households were made up of individuals, and 6.7% had someone living alone who was 65 years of age or older. The average household size was 2.20 and the average family size was 2.42.

In the village, the population was spread out, with 18.2% under the age of 18, 3.0% from 18 to 24, 24.2% from 25 to 44, 27.3% from 45 to 64, and 27.3% who were 65 years of age or older. The median age was 50 years. For every 100 females, there were 94.1 males. For every 100 females age 18 and over, there were 92.9 males.

The median income for a household in the village was $33,750, and the median income for a family was $44,375. Males had a median income of $33,125 versus $21,667 for females. The per capita income for the village was $19,243. None of the population and none of the families were below the poverty line.

== Education ==
The school district is Joplin School District. Zoned schools include: Stapleton Elementary School and South Middle School, with all school district residents zoned to Joplin High School.
