= Shoal Creek Drive, Missouri =

- Village
- Location of Shoal Creek Drive, Missouri
- Coordinates: 37°02′13″N 94°31′22″W
- Country: United States
- State: Missouri
- County: Newton

Area
  - Total: 0.47 sq mi (1.22 km^{2})
  - Land: 0.47 sq mi (1.22 km^{2})
  - Water: 0 sq mi (0.00 km^{2})
- Elevation: 997 ft (304 m)

Population (2020)
  - Total: 356
  - Density: 758.3/sq mi (292.78/km^{2})
- Time zone: UTC-6 (Central (CST))
  - Summer (DST): UTC-5 (CDT)
- ZIP code: 64804
- Area code: 417
- FIPS code: 29-67628
- GNIS feature ID: 2399810

Shoal Creek Drive is a village in Newton County, Missouri, United States. As of the 2020 census, Shoal Creek Drive had a population of 356. It is part of the Joplin, Missouri Metropolitan Statistical Area.

== Geography ==
According to the United States Census Bureau, the village has a total area of 0.47 square miles (1.22 km^{2}), all land.

== Demographics ==
Historical population
Census	Pop.	Note	%±
1950	231		—
1960	500		116.5%
1970	433		−13.4%
1980	244		−43.6%
1990	509		108.6%
2000	346		−32.0%
2010	337		−2.6%
2020	356		5.6%
U.S. Decennial Census

=== 2010 census ===
As of the census of 2010, there were 337 people, 141 households, and 96 families living in the village. The population density was 717.0 inhabitants per square mile (276.8/km^{2}). There were 161 housing units at an average density of 342.6 per square mile (132.3/km^{2}). The racial makeup of the village was 95.0% White, 0.6% African American, 1.8% Native American, 0.6% Asian, 1.2% from other races, and 0.9% from two or more races. Hispanic or Latino of any race were 5.0% of the population.

There were 141 households, of which 24.1% had children under the age of 18 living with them, 53.2% were married couples living together, 8.5% had a female householder with no husband present, 6.4% had a male householder with no wife present, and 31.9% were non-families. 25.5% of all households were made up of individuals, and 12.8% had someone living alone who was 65 years of age or older. The average household size was 2.39 and the average family size was 2.88.

The median age in the village was 47.3 years. 19% of residents were under the age of 18; 5.8% were between the ages of 18 and 24; 22.5% were from 25 to 44; 32.3% were from 45 to 64; and 20.5% were 65 years of age or older. The gender makeup of the village was 50.4% male and 49.6% female.

=== 2000 census ===
As of the census of 2000, there were 346 people, 133 households, and 104 families living in the village. The population density was 735.6 inhabitants per square mile (284.0/km^{2}). There were 155 housing units at an average density of 329.6 per square mile (127.3/km^{2}). The racial makeup of the village was 92.77% White, 2.02% African American, 2.60% Native American, 0.29% Asian, 0.29% Pacific Islander, 0.58% from other races, and 1.45% from two or more races. Hispanic or Latino of any race were 2.31% of the population.

There were 133 households, out of which 32.3% had children under the age of 18 living with them, 64.7% were married couples living together, 6.8% had a female householder with no husband present, and 21.8% were non-families. 21.1% of all households were made up of individuals, and 9.8% had someone living alone who was 65 years of age or older. The average household size was 2.60 and the average family size was 2.92.

In the village, the population was spread out, with 24.3% under the age of 18, 6.4% from 18 to 24, 26.3% from 25 to 44, 22.5% from 45 to 64, and 20.5% who were 65 years of age or older. The median age was 41 years. For every 100 females, there were 95.5 males. For every 100 females age 18 and over, there were 100.0 males.

The median income for a household in the village was $39,167, and the median income for a family was $41,250. Males had a median income of $27,188 versus $24,688 for females. The per capita income for the village was $21,253. About 7.4% of families and 7.5% of the population were below the poverty line, including 10.3% of those under age 18 and none of those age 65 or over.

== Education ==
The school district is Joplin School District. Residents in eastern portions are zoned to Stapleton Elementary School while residents of western portions are zoned to Irving Elementary School. Residents of both of those school zones are zoned to South Middle School, and all school district residents are zoned to Joplin High School.
