= Spring City, Missouri =

Spring City
- Unincorporated community
- Location within the state of Missouri
- Coordinates: 36°59′12″N 94°32′3″W
- Country: United States
- State: Missouri
- County: Newton
- Time zone: UTC-6 (Central (CST))
  - Summer (DST): UTC-5 (CDT)

Spring City is an unincorporated community in Newton County, Missouri, United States. It is located five miles south of Joplin on Route 86. The community is part of the Joplin, Missouri Metropolitan Statistical Area.

Spring City was laid out in 1885. and named for a spring near the original town site. A post office called Spring City was established in 1893, and remained in operation until 1903.
