= Redings Mill, Missouri =

- Village
- Location of Redings Mill, Missouri
- Coordinates: 37°01′10″N 94°31′01″W
- Country: United States
- State: Missouri
- County: Newton

Area
  - Total: 0.21 sq mi (0.54 km^{2})
  - Land: 0.20 sq mi (0.52 km^{2})
  - Water: 0.0077 sq mi (0.02 km^{2})
- Elevation: 951 ft (290 m)

Population (2020)
  - Total: 164
  - Density: 816.7/sq mi (315.33/km^{2})
- Time zone: UTC-6 (Central (CST))
  - Summer (DST): UTC-5 (CDT)
- FIPS code: 29-60986
- GNIS feature ID: 2399053

Redings Mill is a village in Newton County, Missouri, United States. As of the 2020 census, Redings Mill had a population of 164. It is part of the Joplin, Missouri Metropolitan Statistical Area.

== History ==
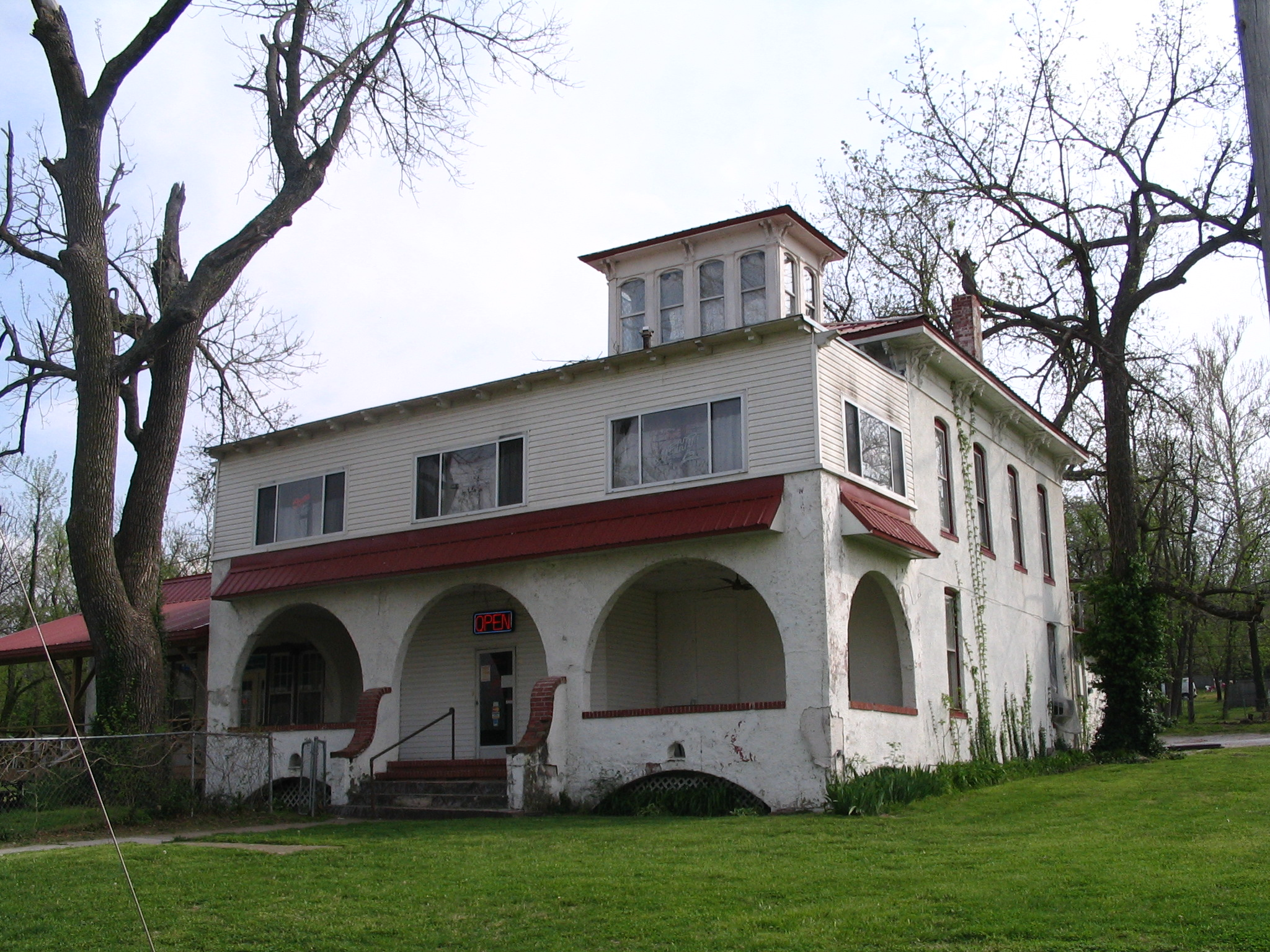
Photo of the Redings Mill Inn, built in the 19th century

Redings Mill was named for millwright John S. Reding (1816–1892). He built the first mill in Newton County prior to the American Civil War. A variant name was "Shoalsburgh". A post office called Shoalsburg was established in 1867, and remained in operation until 1883.

== Geography ==
According to the United States Census Bureau, the village has a total area of 0.21 square miles (0.54 km^{2}), of which 0.20 square miles (0.52 km^{2}) is land and 0.01 square miles (0.03 km^{2}) is water.

== Demographics ==
Historical population
Census	Pop.	Note	%±
1960	202		—
1970	179		−11.4%
1980	222		24.0%
1990	204		−8.1%
2000	159		−22.1%
2010	151		−5.0%
2020	164		8.6%
U.S. Decennial Census

=== 2010 census ===
As of the census of 2010, there were 151 people, 64 households, and 42 families living in the village. The population density was 755.0 inhabitants per square mile (291.5/km^{2}). There were 74 housing units at an average density of 370.0 per square mile (142.9/km^{2}). The racial makeup of the village was 98.0% White, 0.7% African American, and 1.3% from two or more races. Hispanic or Latino of any race were 2.0% of the population.

There were 64 households, of which 31.3% had children under the age of 18 living with them, 57.8% were married couples living together, 7.8% had a female householder with no husband present, and 34.4% were non-families. 29.7% of all households were made up of individuals, and 9.4% had someone living alone who was 65 years of age or older. The average household size was 2.36 and the average family size was 2.95.

The median age in the village was 48.5 years. 22.5% of residents were under the age of 18; 3.9% were between the ages of 18 and 24; 20.5% were from 25 to 44; 32.4% were from 45 to 64; and 20.5% were 65 years of age or older. The gender makeup of the village was 49.0% male and 51.0% female.

=== 2000 census ===
As of the census of 2000, there were 159 people, 69 households, and 44 families living in the village. The population density was 773.1 inhabitants per square mile (298.5/km^{2}). There were 76 housing units at an average density of 369.5 per square mile (142.7/km^{2}). The racial makeup of the village was 91.19% White, 5.03% Native American, 0.63% Pacific Islander, and 3.14% from two or more races. Hispanic or Latino of any race were 1.89% of the population.

There were 69 households, out of which 31.9% had children under the age of 18 living with them, 52.2% were married couples living together, 13.0% had a female householder with no husband present, and 34.8% were non-families. 29.0% of all households were made up of individuals, and 8.7% had someone living alone who was 65 years of age or older. The average household size was 2.30 and the average family size was 2.91.

In the village, the population was spread out, with 23.3% under the age of 18, 6.9% from 18 to 24, 27.0% from 25 to 44, 32.1% from 45 to 64, and 10.7% who were 65 years of age or older. The median age was 41 years. For every 100 females, there were 87.1 males. For every 100 females age 18 and over, there were 82.1 males.

The median income for a household in the village was $35,938, and the median income for a family was $45,313. Males had a median income of $30,417 versus $27,500 for females. The per capita income for the village was $18,629. None of the families and 4.6% of the population were living below the poverty line.

== Education ==
The school district is Joplin School District. Zoned schools include: Stapleton Elementary School and South Middle School, with all school district residents zoned to Joplin High School.
