= Joplin School District =

School district in Missouri, U.S.

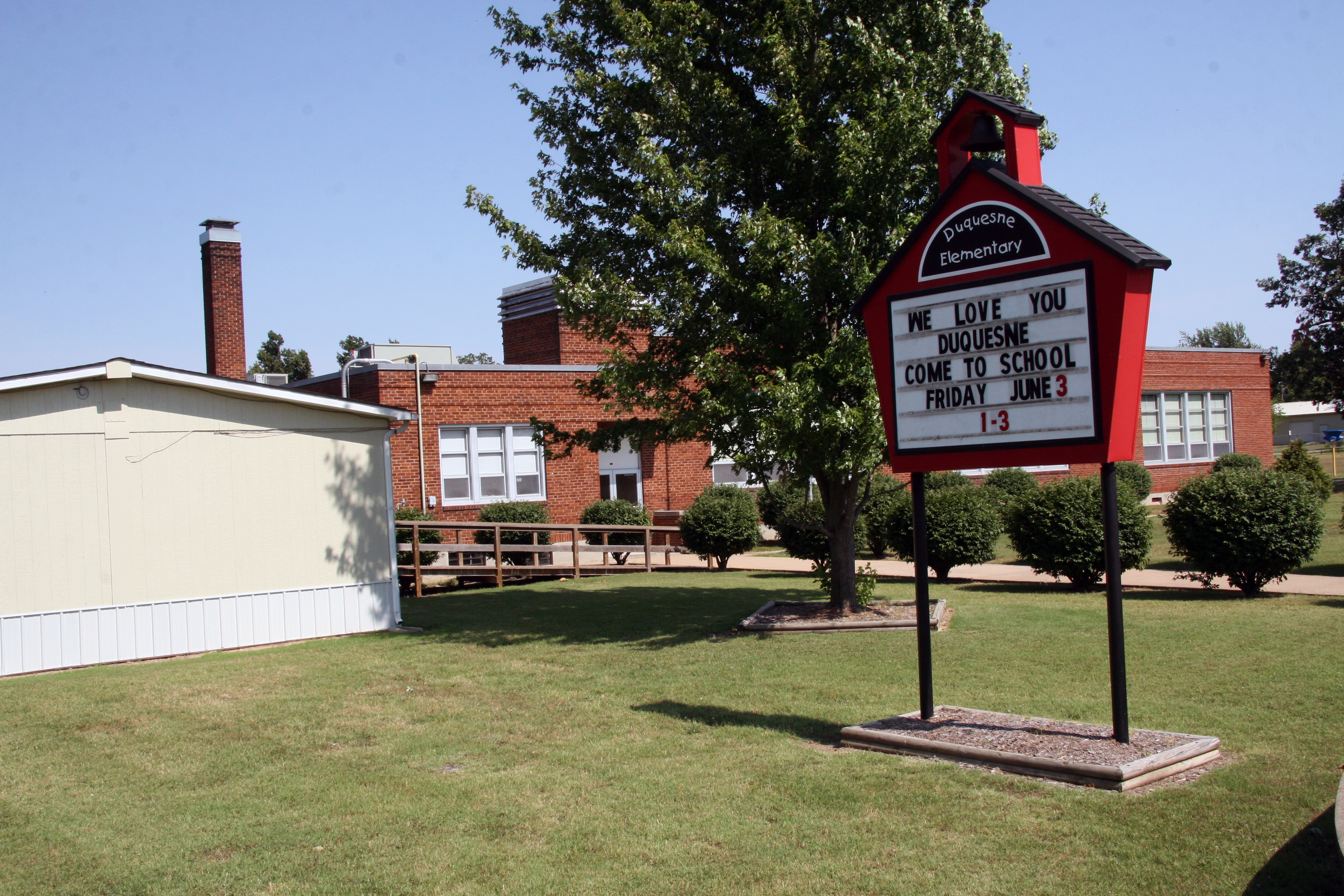
- Duquesne Elementary School

Location
- Jasper and Newton Counties, Missouri United States
- Coordinates: 37°03′17″N 94°26′11″W

District information
- Type: Public
- Motto: Learning Today for a Better Tomorrow
- Grades: Pre K–12
- NCES District ID: 2916350

Students and staff
- Students: 7,766
- Teachers: 546.26 (on FTE basis)
- Student–teacher ratio: 14.22:1
- District mascot: Eagle
- Colors: Cardinal Red, Navy Blue, Silver, White

Other information
- Website: www.joplinschools.org

The Joplin School District is located in Jasper and Newton counties, in the City of Joplin, Missouri. It serves more than 7,700 students in the school district.

== Communities in the district ==
- Joplin (the majority)
- Cliff Village
- Dennis Acres
- Duenweg (almost all)
- Duquesne
- Grand Falls Plaza
- Leawood
- Redings Mill
- Saginaw
- Shoal Creek Drive
- Shoal Creek Estates
- Webb City (partial)

== Recent history ==
On May 22, 2011, an EF5 tornado caused extensive damage to much of the city. Joplin High School, Franklin Technology Center, East Middle School, the old South Middle School, Irving Elementary, and Emerson Elementary were destroyed; Cecil Floyd Elementary, Duquesne Elementary, Eastmorland Elementary, and Kelsey Norman were damaged.

The district re-opened its Middle and Elementary schools on January 9, 2014; and Joplin High School and Franklin Technology Center re-opened in August 2014. The district had a long appeals process with the Federal Emergency Management Agency about adequate disaster funding years after all schools had reopened.

In March 2020, it was decided to close schools due to the COVID-19 pandemic until April 3. Later, the schools closed for the remainder of the year. On August 24, the schools reopened, with Joplin High School having a split schedule due to the number of students.

In January 2023, a new elementary school named Dover Hill Elementary opened. The school replaced Columbia and West Central elementary, which were closed due to inadequate buildings. The schools operated under a joint administration from 2021-2022 until the opening of the new school.

== Schools ==
=== High school ===
- Joplin High School
- Franklin Technology Center

=== Middle schools ===
- East Middle School
- North Middle School
- South Middle School

=== Elementary ===
- Cecil Floyd
- Dover Hill (formed out of Columbia and West Central)
- Eastmorland
- Irving
- Jefferson
- Kelsey Norman
- McKinley
- Royal Heights
- Soaring Heights
- Stapleton

=== Former schools ===
- Columbia (closed and consolidated with West Central due to aging and safety concerns. Demolished during the Summer of 2023)
- Duenweg (closed and consolidated in response to redistricting following the May 2011 tornado)
- Duquesne (closed and consolidated in response to redistricting following the May 2011 tornado)
- Emerson (damaged in May 2011 tornado, razed in December 2016)
- Memorial (currently utilized as the district's administration offices. Formerly housed Joplin High School, Memorial High School, Memorial Middle School)
- Parkwood High School (consolidated into Joplin High School in 1985; building was destroyed in May 2011 tornado)
- Washington Education Center (former elementary school; housed Irving Elementary after the tornado)
- West Central (closed and consolidated with Columbia due to aging and safety concerns)
