= Saginaw, Missouri =

- Village
- Location of Saginaw, Missouri
- Coordinates: 37°01′34″N 94°28′21″W
- Country: United States
- State: Missouri
- County: Newton

Area
  - Total: 0.83 sq mi (2.14 km^{2})
  - Land: 0.83 sq mi (2.14 km^{2})
  - Water: 0.0039 sq mi (0.01 km^{2})
- Elevation: 1,001 ft (305 m)

Population (2020)
  - Total: 300
  - Density: 363.5/sq mi (140.34/km^{2})
- Time zone: UTC-6 (Central (CST))
  - Summer (DST): UTC-5 (CDT)
- ZIP code: 64864
- Area code: 417
- FIPS code: 29-63902
- GNIS feature ID: 2399155
- Website: saginawmo.com

Saginaw is a village in Newton County, Missouri, United States. As of the 2020 census, Saginaw had a population of 300. It is part of the Joplin, Missouri Metropolitan Statistical Area.

== Geography ==
According to the United States Census Bureau, the village has a total area of 0.83 square miles (2.15 km^{2}), all land.

The terrain is rolling hills and bluffs and features the Ozark hickory and oak forest which are typical of the region. Shoal Creek, the third-largest tributary of the ecologically important Spring River watershed, straddles its southern boundary.

== History ==
Saginaw was originally named Thurman, after one Mr. Thurman the proprietor of a local country store. A post office called Thurman was established in 1873, and the name was changed to Saginaw in 1889. The present name is after Saginaw, Michigan.

== Demographics ==
Historical population
Census	Pop.	Note	%±
1960	188		—
1970	224		19.1%
1980	293		30.8%
1990	384		31.1%
2000	276		−28.1%
2010	297		7.6%
2020	300		1.0%
U.S. Decennial Census

=== 2010 census ===
As of the census of 2010, there were 297 people, 129 households, and 81 families living in the village. The population density was 357.8 inhabitants per square mile (138.1/km^{2}). There were 138 housing units at an average density of 166.3 per square mile (64.2/km^{2}). The racial makeup of the village was 94.3% White, 0.3% African American, 3.4% Native American, 0.3% Pacific Islander, 0.3% from other races, and 1.3% from two or more races. Hispanic or Latino of any race were 2.0% of the population.

There were 129 households, of which 26.4% had children under the age of 18 living with them, 49.6% were married couples living together, 9.3% had a female householder with no husband present, 3.9% had a male householder with no wife present, and 37.2% were non-families. 24.8% of all households were made up of individuals, and 4.6% had someone living alone who was 65 years of age or older. The average household size was 2.30 and the average family size was 2.80.

The median age in the village was 45.2 years. 20.2% of residents were under the age of 18; 5.4% were between the ages of 18 and 24; 24% were from 25 to 44; 36.1% were from 45 to 64; and 14.5% were 65 years of age or older. The gender makeup of the village was 53.2% male and 46.8% female.

=== 2000 census ===
As of the census of 2000, there were 276 people, 115 households, and 77 families living in the village. The population density was 337.2 inhabitants per square mile (130.2/km^{2}). There were 126 housing units at an average density of 153.9 per square mile (59.4/km^{2}). The racial makeup of the village was 93.12% White, 0.72% African American, 3.99% Native American, and 2.17% from two or more races. Hispanic or Latino of any race were 1.09% of the population.

There were 115 households, out of which 27.0% had children under the age of 18 living with them, 60.0% were married couples living together, 5.2% had a female householder with no husband present, and 32.2% were non-families. 23.5% of all households were made up of individuals, and 6.1% had someone living alone who was 65 years of age or older. The average household size was 2.40 and the average family size was 2.88.

In the village, the population was spread out, with 22.1% under the age of 18, 6.2% from 18 to 24, 31.2% from 25 to 44, 27.9% from 45 to 64, and 12.7% who were 65 years of age or older. The median age was 41 years. For every 100 females, there were 94.4 males. For every 100 females age 18 and over, there were 104.8 males.

The median income for a household in the village was $42,083, and the median income for a family was $51,250. Males had a median income of $31,250 versus $21,250 for females. The per capita income for the village was $22,639. About 7.2% of families and 9.1% of the population were below the poverty line, including 8.7% of those under the age of eighteen and 19.4% of those 65 or over.

== Education ==
The school district is Joplin School District. Zoned schools include: Stapleton Elementary School and South Middle School, with all school district residents zoned to Joplin High School.
