= Dennis Acres, Missouri =

- Village
- Location of Dennis Acres, Missouri
- Coordinates: 37°02′47″N 94°30′16″W
- Country: United States
- State: Missouri
- County: Newton

Area
  - Total: 0.042 sq mi (0.11 km^{2})
  - Land: 0.042 sq mi (0.11 km^{2})
  - Water: 0 sq mi (0.00 km^{2})
- Elevation: 1,056 ft (322 m)

Population (2020)
  - Total: 47
  - Density: 1,107.7/sq mi (427.67/km^{2})
- Time zone: UTC-6 (Central (CST))
  - Summer (DST): UTC-5 (CDT)
- FIPS code: 29-19090
- GNIS feature ID: 2398711

Dennis Acres is a village in Newton County, Missouri, United States. As of the 2020 census, Dennis Acres had a population of 47.

== Geography ==
According to the United States Census Bureau, the village has a total area of 0.05 square miles (0.13 km^{2}), all land.

== Demographics ==
Historical population
Census	Pop.	Note	%±
1960	99		—
1970	64		−35.4%
1980	56		−12.5%
1990	157		180.4%
2000	68		−56.7%
2010	76		11.8%
2020	47		−38.2%
U.S. Decennial Census

=== 2010 census ===
As of the census of 2010, there were 76 people, 27 households, and 18 families living in the village. The population density was 1,520.0 inhabitants per square mile (586.9/km^{2}). There were 31 housing units at an average density of 620.0 per square mile (239.4/km^{2}). The racial makeup of the village was 76.3% White, 1.3% Native American, 1.3% Pacific Islander, 14.5% from other races, and 6.6% from two or more races. Hispanic or Latino of any race were 18.4% of the population.

There were 27 households, of which 44.4% had children under the age of 18 living with them, 48.1% were married couples living together, 11.1% had a female householder with no husband present, 7.4% had a male householder with no wife present, and 33.3% were non-families. 22.2% of all households were made up of individuals, and 7.4% had someone living alone who was 65 years of age or older. The average household size was 2.81 and the average family size was 3.44.

The median age in the village was 26.3 years. 26.3% of residents were under the age of 18; 21.1% were between the ages of 18 and 24; 23.7% were from 25 to 44; 18.3% were from 45 to 64; and 10.5% were 65 years of age or older. The gender makeup of the village was 48.7% male and 51.3% female.

=== 2000 census ===
As of the census of 2000, there were 68 people, 27 households, and 12 families living in the village. The population density was 1,455.7 inhabitants per square mile (562.0/km^{2}). There were 29 housing units at an average density of 620.8 per square mile (239.7/km^{2}). The racial makeup of the village was 70.59% White, 11.76% Native American, 10.29% from other races, and 7.35% from two or more races. Hispanic or Latino of any race were 16.18% of the population.

There were 27 households, out of which 29.6% had children under the age of 18 living with them, 33.3% were married couples living together, 11.1% had a female householder with no husband present, and 51.9% were non-families. 33.3% of all households were made up of individuals, and 7.4% had someone living alone who was 65 years of age or older. The average household size was 2.52 and the average family size was 3.54.

In the village, the population was spread out, with 30.9% under the age of 18, 10.3% from 18 to 24, 33.8% from 25 to 44, 11.8% from 45 to 64, and 13.2% who were 65 years of age or older. The median age was 30 years. For every 100 females, there were 106.1 males. For every 100 females age 18 and over, there were 95.8 males.

The median income for a household in the village was $28,125, and the median income for a family was $28,750. Males had a median income of $28,333 versus $13,750 for females. The per capita income for the village was $8,709. There were 11.1% of families and 17.1% of the population living below the poverty line, including no under eighteens and none of those over 64.

== Education ==
The school district is Joplin School District. Zoned schools include: Stapleton Elementary School and South Middle School, with all school district residents zoned to Joplin High School.
