= Missouri Prairie Foundation =

- Formation: 1987
- Type: Nonprofit organization
- Purpose: Conservation and stewardship of tallgrass prairie
- Headquarters: Columbia, Missouri
- Region served: Missouri, United States
- Affiliations: University of Missouri

The Missouri Prairie Foundation (MPF) is a private-sector nonprofit foundation dedicated to the stewardship of original and replanted tallgrass prairie lands in the U.S. state of Missouri. Missouri, together with its neighbor state Iowa, are at the heart of the tallgrass prairie biome. In large stretches of interior North America, local climate patterns favor well-watered grassland or grassy savanna, and MPF celebrates this pattern of local natural areas. As of 2023, the MPF owns more than 4,400 acres (1,800 ha) of prairie in 32 tracts in various locations throughout Missouri.

The MPF manages its lands with the primary goal of maintaining and increasing biome diversity, particularly botanical diversity. The Foundation has counted 30 species of conservation concern that live on its tracts of land. The Foundation operates its land parcels in cooperation with the Missouri Department of Conservation (MDOC).

Examples of tallgrass prairie stewarded by MPF include Carver Prairie, a parcel of original and reseeded prairie adjacent to the larger Diamond Grove Prairie Conservation Area, an MDOC tract, near Diamond, Missouri. The Carver Prairie is located near the George Washington Carver National Monument historical complex, and enables visitors to view a landscape that resembles that of the American Civil War.

The Missouri Prairie Foundation is headquartered in Columbia, Missouri, near the center of the state. As of 2023, the MPF had an affiliate relationship with the Bradford Research Farm of the University of Missouri (MU) at Columbia.
