= Diamond Grove =

Diamond Grove may refer to the following places in the United States:

- Diamond Grove, Virginia in Brunswick County
- Diamond Grove, Wisconsin in Grant County
- Diamond, Missouri, formerly known as Diamond Grove
