= George Washington Carver Museum =

The George Washington Carver Museum may refer to several different things. These include:

- George Washington Carver Museum (Tuskegee, Alabama) in Tuskegee, Alabama, founded in 1941 by George Washington Carver
- George Washington Carver Museum and Cultural Center in Austin, Texas
- George Washington Carver Museum and Cultural Center, housed in the former Carver High School (formerly Phoenix Union Colored High School) in Phoenix, Arizona
- George Washington Carver Museum in Dothan, Alabama (the "Peanut Capital of the World")
- The Central-Carver Legacy Museum (formerly Carver High School) in Gadsden, Alabama
- George Washington Carver National Monument in Diamond, Missouri
