= George Washington Carver at Tuskegee Institute (film) =

- Cinematography: C. Allen Alexander
- Running time: 12 minutes
- Country: United States

George Washington Carver at Tuskegee Institute is an amateur color film shot by C. Allen Alexander at the Tuskegee Institute in Tuskegee, Alabama. In 2019, the film was selected for preservation in the National Film Registry by the Library of Congress.

The film features George Washington Carver doing mundane activities such as knitting, working in the lab, tending to flowers, and displaying his paintings. The film also includes footage of the school's marching band, a football game, a farm, and other miscellaneous scenes of the Tuskegee Institute campus.

== Background ==
In 1937, C. Allen Alexander, an African American surgeon from Kalamazoo, Michigan, was invited to the Tuskegee Institute to capture footage of George Washington Carver, who up until that point, had not allowed video footage to be taken of himself. Alexander shot the film over several days using 16 mm Kodachrome film and a handheld Kodak camera. Alexander then stored and kept the film in his bank vault until 1981 when he donated the footage to the George Washington Carver National Monument. In 2019, The film was selected for preservation and inducted into the National Film Registry by the Library of Congress, as part of an effort to identify more diverse and less traditional styles of films. The film was also digitized by the National Archives as part of its efforts to "preserve and make available the historically significant film collections of the National Park Service."

In his donation letter, Alexander claimed that he shot the film in 1937, which is also the same year as the date code on the original film stock. However, several things depicted in the film such as the George Washington Carver Museum, and an elevator built by Henry Ford, did not exist until 1941. This indicates that the film was likely shot around 1941 or 1942, rather than the given date of 1937.
