= Golden Prairie =

Protected area of tallgrass prairie in Missouri

- IUCN category III (natural monument or feature)
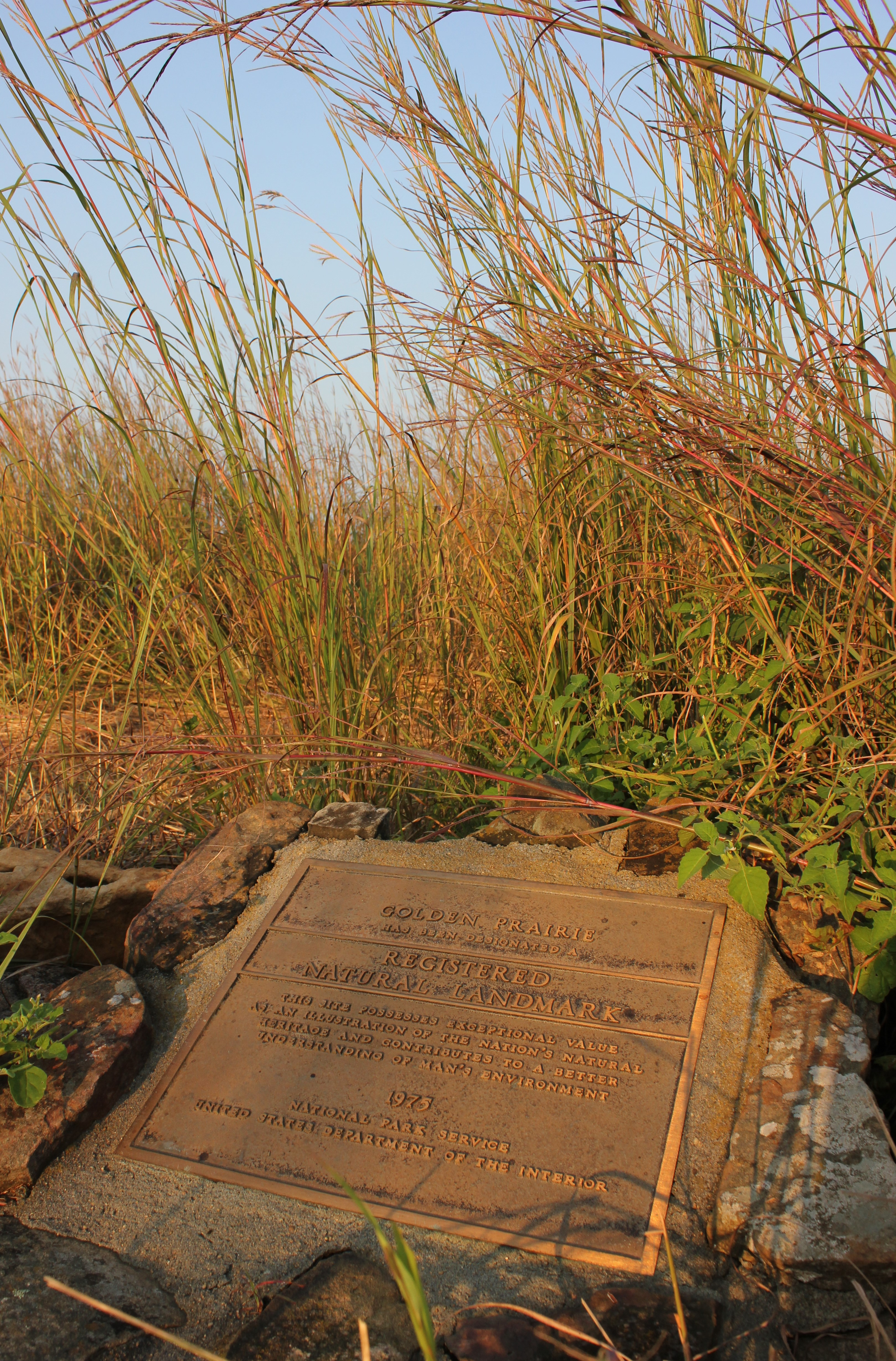
- National Natural Landmark plaque

- Location within Missouri
- Location: Barton County, Missouri, USA
- Nearest city: Golden City
- Coordinates: 37°21′45″N 94°9′0″W
- Area: 630 acres (250 ha)
- Established: 1970
- Governing body: Missouri Prairie Foundation

U.S. National Natural Landmark
- Designated: 1975

Golden Prairie is a 630-acre (2,500,000 m^{2}) tallgrass prairie named for its proximity to Golden City in the U.S. state of Missouri. The core 320-acre (1,300,000 m^{2}) area is a National Natural Landmark.

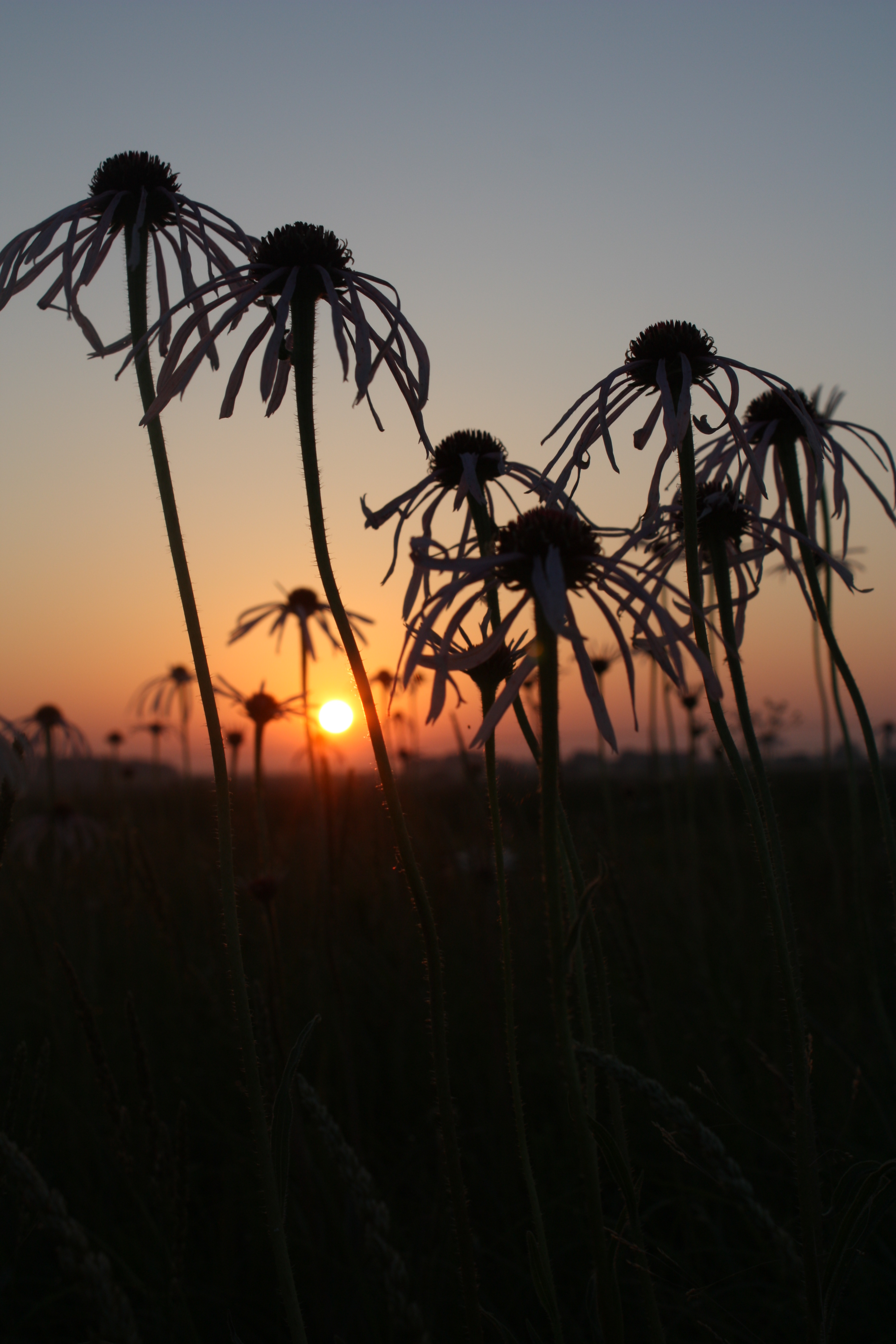
Purple coneflowers (Echinacea pallida) at sunrise on Golden Prairie

== Ecology ==
The rolling landscape of Golden Prairie developed from Mississippian sandstones, shales, and cherty limestone. It contains examples of dry-mesic sandstone prairie, chert prairie, hardpan prairie, prairie swales and a "segment of a prairie headwater stream".

State-endangered species found at Golden Prairie include the prairie mole cricket, the regal fritillary butterfly, and the Arkansas darter. The federally-endangered prairie chicken, formerly common on the prairie, has not been observed for several years.

Other grassland birds found at Golden Prairie include northern bobwhite, short-eared owls, dickcissels, eastern meadowlarks, grasshopper sparrows, and Henslow's sparrows.

Among the over 340 vascular plants at the site are the characteristic tallgrass prairie plant species big bluestem and prairie dropseed, but rarer plants such as royal catchfly (Silene regia) can also be found.

== History ==
Utilized for hay since European settlers first arrived, prairie restoration at Golden Prairie began in the early 1970s after it was purchased by the Missouri Prairie Foundation (MPF). This has included the use of controlled burns to stimulate native prairie vegetation, the removal of trees, and the control of invasive exotic plants. In May 1975, Golden Prairie was declared a National Natural Landmark by the National Park Service.

In 2002, MPF purchased two adjacent tracts totaling 310 acres and they are being restored. In 2015, the original 320-acre portion of Golden Prairie was designated the Golden Prairie Natural Area and is included in the Missouri Natural Areas program, a designation reserved for only the highest quality natural landscapes. A history of Golden Prairie was published in the summer 2015 issue of the Missouri Prairie Journal (Vol. 36, No. 2).
