= Moses Carver =

American settler (1812–1910)

Moses Carver (29 August 1812 – 19 December 1910) was an American settler and the adoptive father of George Washington Carver, his former slave.

== Biography ==
Moses Carver was born in Dayton, Ohio. Historians disagree on whether his family was of German or English descent. On August 11, 1834, he married Susan Blue in Springfield, Illinois. He and his brother Richard migrated to southwest Missouri around 1838 from Ohio and Illinois. The Preemption Act of 1841 allowed farmers who lived on and improved 160 acres (0.65 km^{2}) of land for six months to buy the land from the government at a low price. Moses Carver purchased a total of 240 acres (0.97 km^{2}) in Marion Township, Newton County, Missouri.

As an early settler in the area, Carver selected a good site with an abundant water supply. He built a one-room log cabin with a window, a fireplace, and no floor. This is where he and Susan initially lived, along with three nieces and nephews, whom they raised after Richard's death in 1839.

Moses needed help as the farm prospered and in 1855, he purchased Mary, an enslaved thirteen-year-old girl, from a neighbor.

Mary later gave birth to several children who became the property of Moses, among whom were James and George. Towards the end of the Civil War, George and his mother were abducted, probably by bushwhackers. George was brought back, costing Moses a prize horse, but his mother was never seen again. After slavery was abolished in Missouri (1865), Moses and Susan continued to raise James and George on the farm.

In a state strongly divided by the tensions leading to the Civil War, the independent-minded and eccentric Moses Carver was in a difficult position, since he offended Confederates by being a Unionist, and Unionists by owning slaves.

George left the farm when he was eleven to go to the black school in Neosho, Missouri. He returned to the Moses Carver farm on weekends, but never lived permanently with the Carvers again.

Susan Blue Carver died on January 23, 1892, at Diamond, Missouri. On January 29, 1897, Moses remarried to Elizabeth Love, aged 61, who later died in 1904. At age 96, he decided that he was no longer able to farm so he went to Galena, Kansas to live with his nephew, John Carver, on Shoal Creek. Moses died in Galena two years later. He is buried next to Susan Carver in the little family cemetery at Diamond, Missouri.

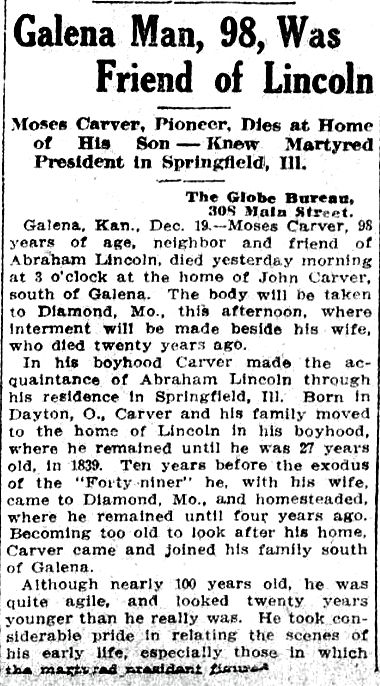

The Moses Carver farm became the George Washington Carver National Monument by an act of Congress in July 1943. The National Park Service maintains 210 acres (0.85 km^{2}) of the original 240-acre (0.97 km^{2}) farm. In 2004 the remaining 30 acres of the original Moses Carver Farm were donated to the George Washington Carver Birthplace District Association by Evelyn Taylor and her late husband W.J. "Bud" Taylor. The Association later donated the land to the National Park Service, making the 240-acre Moses Carver Farm property complete.
