= George Washington Carver =

American botanist and inventor (1864–1943)

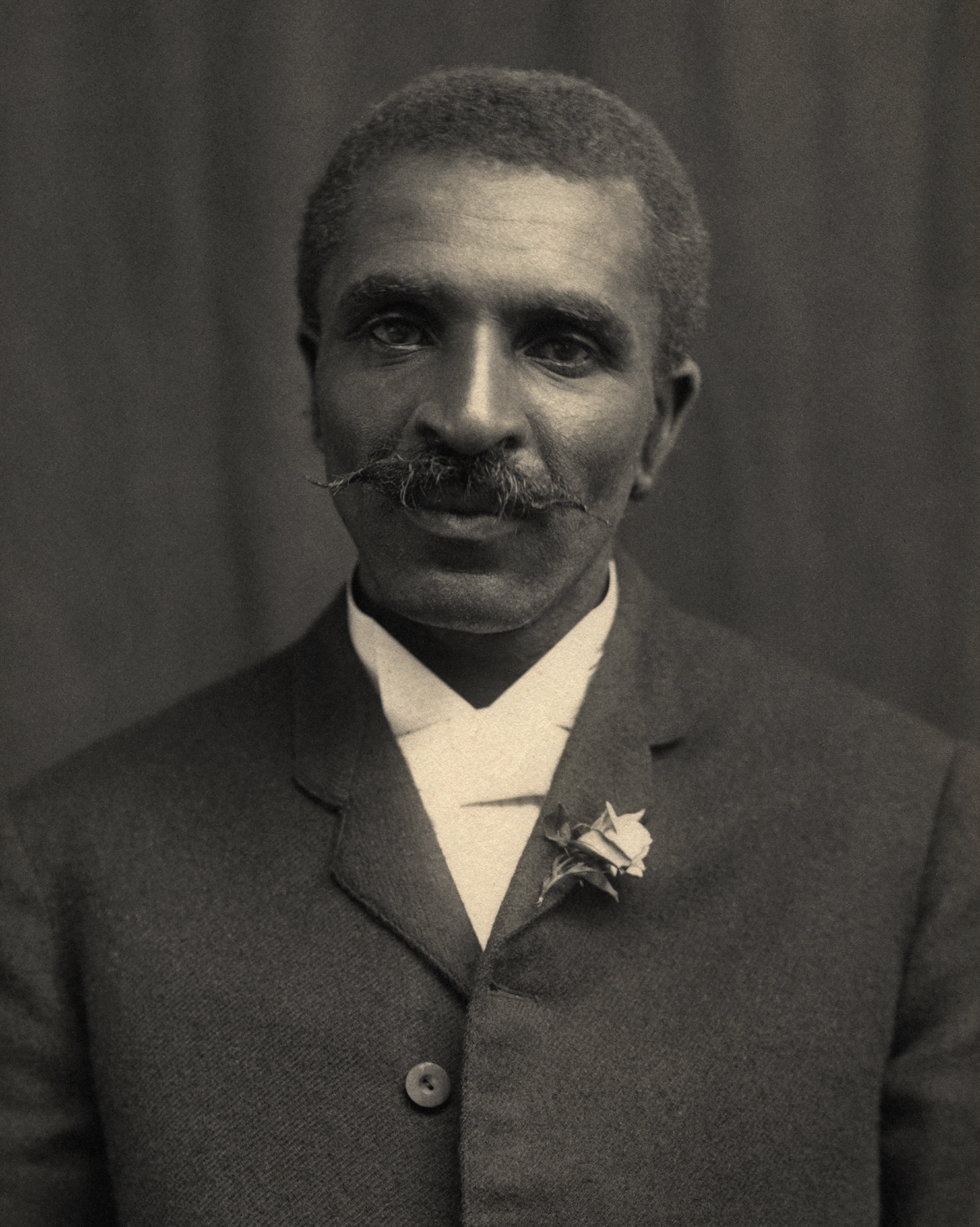
- Carver c. 1910
- Born: c. January 1, 1864; Diamond, Missouri, U.S.
- Died: January 5, 1943 (aged 78–79); Tuskegee, Alabama, U.S.
- Resting place: Tuskegee University
- Education: Iowa State University (BA, MSc)
- Awards: Spingarn Medal (1923)

George Washington Carver (c. 1864 – January 5, 1943) was an American agricultural scientist and inventor who promoted alternative crops to cotton and methods to prevent soil depletion. He was one of the most prominent Black scientists of the early 20th century.

While a professor at Tuskegee Institute, Carver developed techniques to improve types of soils depleted by repeated plantings of cotton. He wanted poor farmers to grow other crops, such as peanuts and sweet potatoes, as a source of their own food and to improve their quality of life. Carver chose these crops due to the conditions of the soil in the area. Under his leadership, the Experiment Station at Tuskegee published over forty practical bulletins for farmers, many written by him, which included recipes; many of the bulletins contained advice for poor farmers, including combating soil depletion with limited financial means, producing bigger crops, and preserving food.

Apart from his work to improve the lives of farmers, Carver was also a leader in promoting environmentalism. He received numerous honors for his work, including the Spingarn Medal of the NAACP. In an era of high racial polarization, his fame reached beyond the black community. He was widely recognized and praised in the white community for his many achievements and talents. In 1941, Time magazine dubbed Carver a "Black Leonardo".

== Early years ==
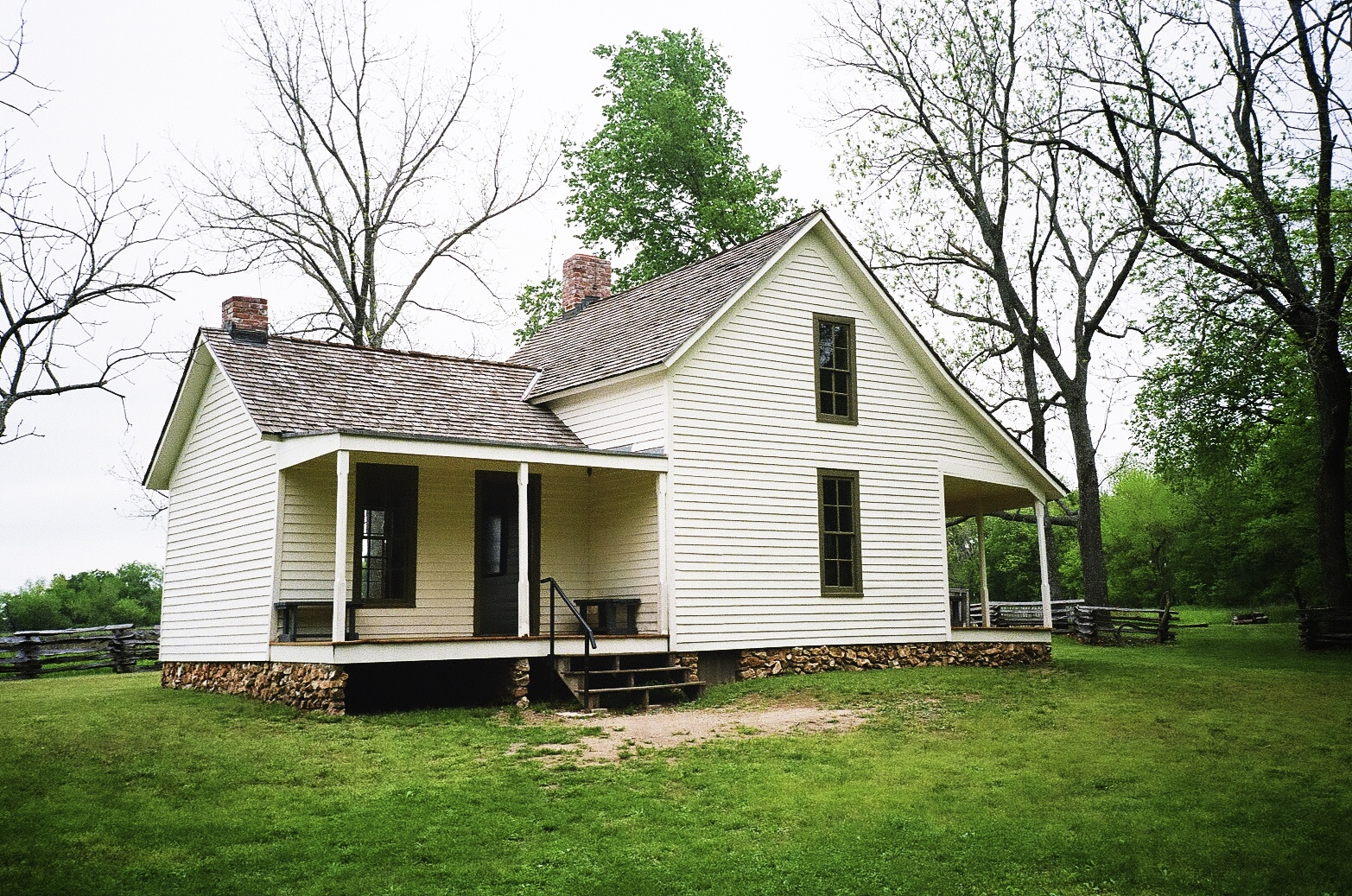
The farmhouse of Moses Carver (built in 1881), near the place where George Carver lived as a youth

Carver was born into slavery, in Diamond Grove, (now Diamond, Newton County, Missouri), near Crystal Palace, sometime in the early 1860s. The date of his birth is uncertain and was not known to Carver because it was before slavery was abolished in Missouri, which occurred in January 1865, during the American Civil War. His enslaver, Moses Carver, descended from a family of immigrants of German or English descent, had purchased George's parents, Mary and Giles, from William P. McGinnis on October 9, 1855, for $700 (~$19,128 in 2025).

Giles died before George was born and when he was a week old, he, his sister, and his mother were kidnapped by night raiders from Arkansas. George's brother, James, was rushed to safety from the kidnappers. The kidnappers sold the trio in Kentucky. Moses Carver hired John Bentley to find them, but he found only the infant George. Moses negotiated with the raiders to gain the boy's return and rewarded Bentley. After slavery was abolished, Moses Carver and his wife, Susan, raised George and his older brother, James, as their own children. They encouraged George to continue his intellectual pursuits, and "Aunt Susan" taught him the basics of reading and writing.

Black people were not allowed at the public school in Diamond Grove. George decided to go to a school for black children 10 miles (16 km) south, in Neosho. When he reached the town, he found the school closed for the night. He slept in a nearby barn. By his own account, the next morning he met a kind woman, Mariah Watkins, from whom he wished to rent a room. When he identified himself as "Carver's George", as he had done his whole life, she replied that from now on his name was "George Carver". George liked Mariah Watkins and her words, "You must learn all you can, then go back out into the world and give your learning back to the people", made a great impression on him.

At age 13, because he wanted to attend the academy there, he moved to the home of another foster family, in Fort Scott, Kansas. After witnessing the killing of a black man by a group of white people, Carver left the city. He attended a series of schools before earning his diploma at Minneapolis High School in Minneapolis, Kansas.

During his time spent in Minneapolis, there was another George Carver in town, which caused confusion over receiving mail. Carver chose a middle initial at random and began requesting letters to him be addressed to George W. Carver. Someone once asked if the "W" stood for Washington, and Carver grinned and said, "Why not?" However, he never used Washington as his middle name, and signed his name as either George W. Carver or simply George Carver.

== College education ==
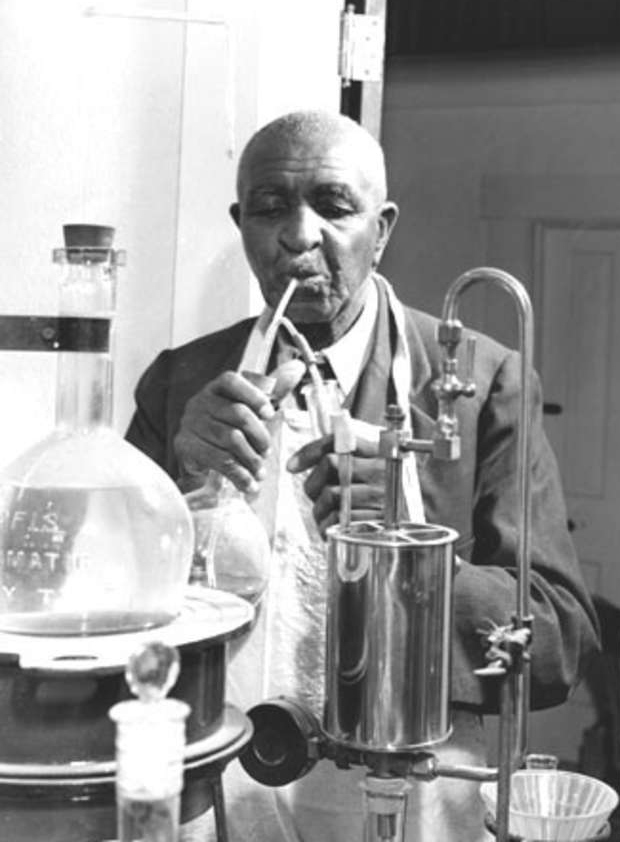
Carver at work in his laboratory

Carver applied to several colleges before being accepted at Highland University in Highland, Kansas. When he arrived, they refused to let him attend because of his race. In August 1886, Carver traveled by wagon with J. F. Beeler from Highland to Eden Township in Ness County, Kansas. He homesteaded a claim near Beeler, where he maintained a small conservatory of plants and flowers and a geological collection. He manually plowed 17 acres (69,000 m^{2}) of the claim, planting rice, corn, Indian corn and garden produce, as well as various fruit trees, forest trees, and shrubbery. He also earned money by odd jobs in town and worked as a ranch hand.

In early 1888, Carver obtained a $300 (~$10,750 in 2025) loan at the Bank of Ness City for education. By June he left the area. In 1890, Carver started studying art and piano at Simpson College in Indianola, Iowa. His art teacher, Etta Budd, recognized Carver's talent for painting flowers and plants; she encouraged him to study botany at Iowa State Agricultural College (now Iowa State University) in Ames.

When he began there in 1891, he was the first black student at Iowa State. Carver's bachelor's thesis for a degree in Agriculture was "Plants as Modified by Man", dated 1894. Iowa State University professors Joseph Budd and Louis Pammel convinced Carver to continue there for his master's degree. Carver did research at the Iowa Agricultural and Home Economics Experiment Station under Pammel over the next two years. His work at the experiment station in plant pathology and mycology first gained him national recognition and respect as a botanist. Carver received his MSc in 1896. Carver was the first African American faculty member at Iowa State.

Despite occasionally being addressed as "doctor", Carver never received an official doctorate, and in a personal communication with Pammel, he noted that it was a "misnomer", given to him by others due to his abilities and their assumptions about his education. Though he did not have an earned doctorate, both Simpson College and Selma University awarded him honorary doctorates of science in his lifetime. In addition, Iowa State awarded him a posthumous doctor of humane letters degree in 1994.

== Tuskegee Institute ==
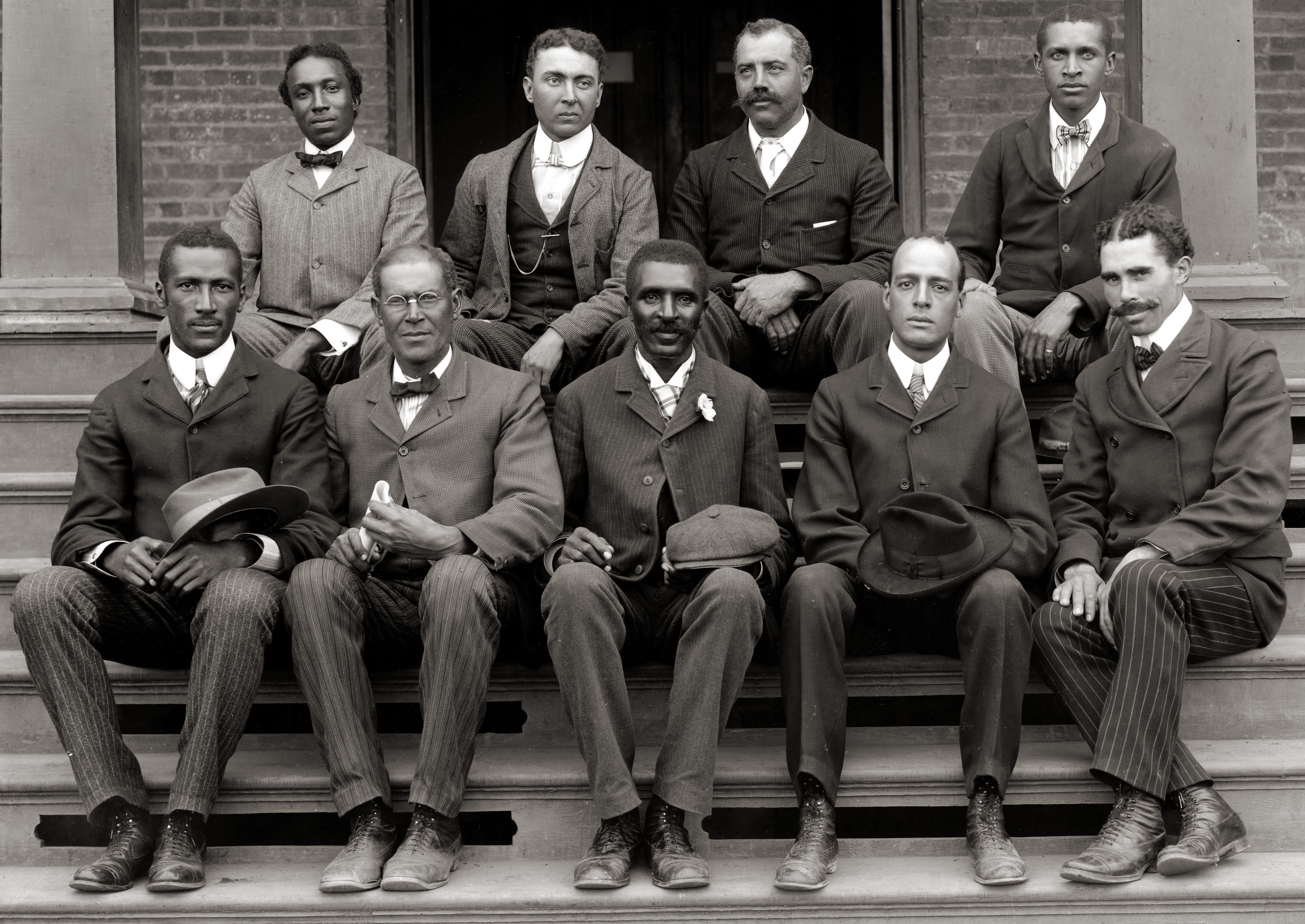
George Washington Carver, front row, center, poses with fellow faculty of Tuskegee Institute in this c. 1902 photograph taken by Frances Benjamin Johnston.

In 1896, Booker T. Washington, the first principal and president of the Tuskegee Institute (now Tuskegee University), invited Carver to head its Agriculture Department. Carver taught there for 47 years, developing the department into a strong research center and working with two additional college presidents during his tenure. He taught methods of crop rotation, introduced several alternative cash crops for farmers that would also improve the soil of areas heavily cultivated in cotton, initiated research into crop products (chemurgy), and taught generations of black students farming techniques for self-sufficiency.

As plant pathologist Carter collected a lot of fungi causing plant diseases. Many of these collections are distributed in two exsiccatae edited by Elam Bartholomew, i.e., Ellis and Everharts´ Fungi Columbiani and Fungi Columbiani. The material is now preserved in herbaria worldwide. In 1902, the famous mycologists Job Bicknell Ellis and Benjamin Matlack Everhart named the fungus Metasphaeria carveri Ellis & Everhart collected by Carver to honour him.

Carver designed a mobile classroom to take education out to farmers. He called it a "Jesup wagon" after the New York financier and philanthropist Morris Ketchum Jesup, who provided funding to support the program.

To recruit Carver to Tuskegee, Washington gave him an above average salary and two rooms for his personal use, although both concessions were resented by some other faculty. Because he had earned a master's in a scientific field from a "white" institution, some faculty perceived him as arrogant. Unmarried faculty members normally had to share rooms, with two to a room, in the spartan early days of the institute.

One of Carver's duties was to administer the Agricultural Experiment Station farms. He had to manage the production and sale of farm products to generate revenue for the institute. He soon proved to be a poor administrator and clashed with other faculty members, especially George Ruffin Bridgeforth. In 1900, Carver complained that the physical work and the letter-writing required were too much.

In 1904, an Institute committee reported that Carver's reports on yields from the poultry yard were exaggerated, and Washington confronted Carver about the issue. Carver replied in writing, "Now to be branded as a liar and party to such hellish deception it is more than I can bear, and if your committee feel that I have willfully lied or [was] party to such lies as were told my resignation is at your disposal." During Washington's last five years at Tuskegee, Carver submitted or threatened his resignation several times: when the administration reorganized the agriculture programs, when he disliked a teaching assignment, to manage an experiment station elsewhere, and when he did not get summer teaching assignments in 1913–14. In each case, Washington smoothed things over.

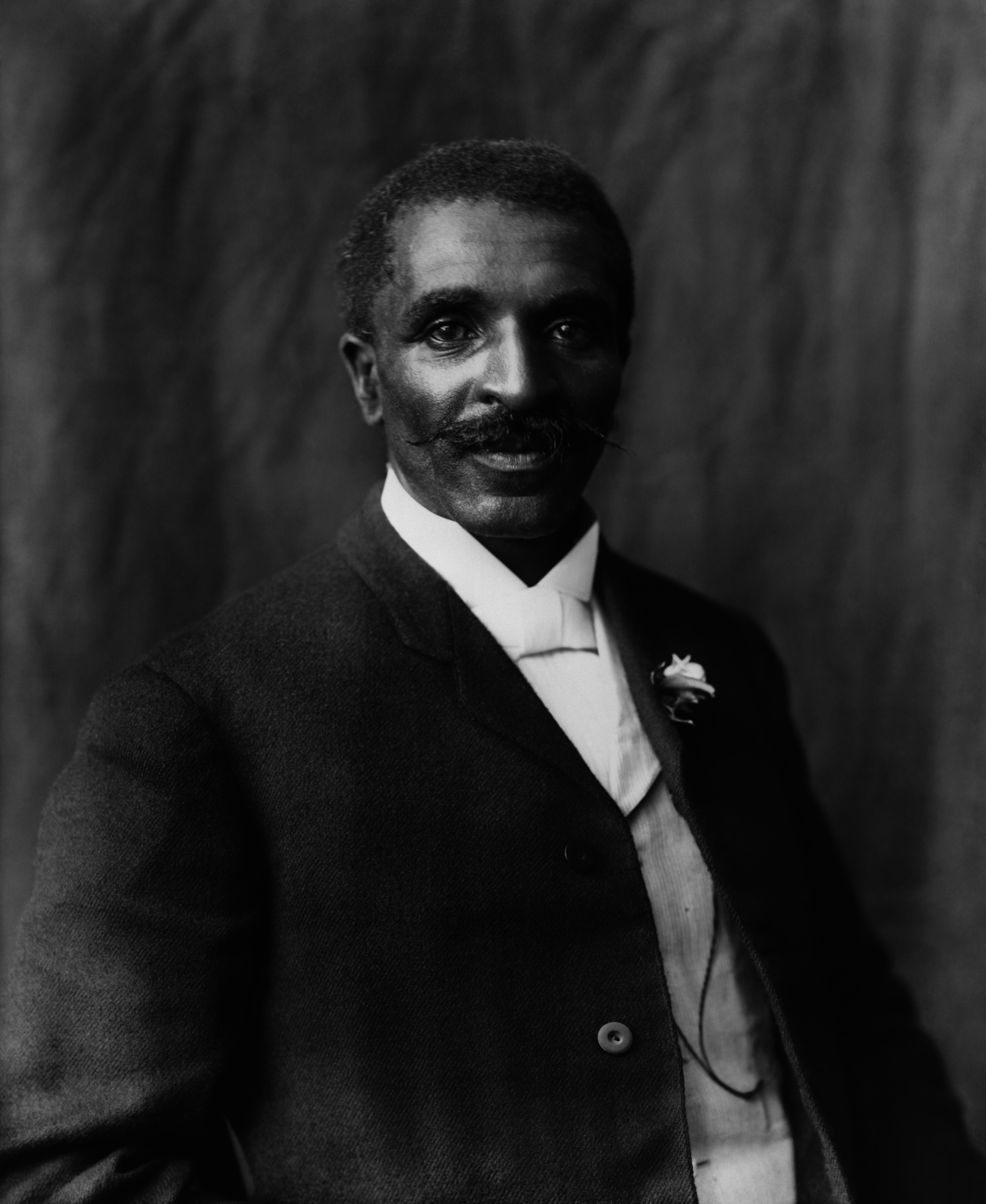
A photograph of George Washington Carver taken by Frances Benjamin Johnston, 1906

Carver started his academic career as a researcher and teacher. In 1911, Washington wrote a letter to him complaining that Carver had not followed orders to plant particular crops at the experiment station. This revealed Washington's micro-management of Carver's department, which he had headed for more than 10 years by then. Washington at the same time refused Carver's requests for a new laboratory, research supplies for his exclusive use, and respite from teaching classes. Washington praised Carver's abilities in teaching and original research but said this about his administrative skills:

When it comes to the organization of classes, the ability required to secure a properly organized and large school or section of a school, you are wanting in ability. When it comes to the matter of practical farm managing which will secure definite, practical, financial results, you are wanting again in ability.

In 1911, Carver complained that his laboratory had not received the equipment which Washington had promised 11 months before. He also complained about Institute committee meetings. Washington praised Carver in his 1911 memoir, My Larger Education: Being Chapters from My Experience. Washington called Carver "one of the most thoroughly scientific men of the Negro race with whom I am acquainted". After Washington died in 1915, his successor made fewer demands on Carver for administrative tasks.

From 1915 to 1923, Carver concentrated on researching and experimenting with new uses for peanuts, sweet potatoes, soybeans, pecans, and other crops, as well as having his assistants research and compile existing uses. This work, and especially his speaking to a national conference of the Peanut Growers Association in 1920 and in testimony before Congress in 1921 to support passage of a tariff on imported peanuts, brought him wide publicity and increasing renown. In these years, he became one of the most well-known African Americans of his time.

== Rise to fame ==
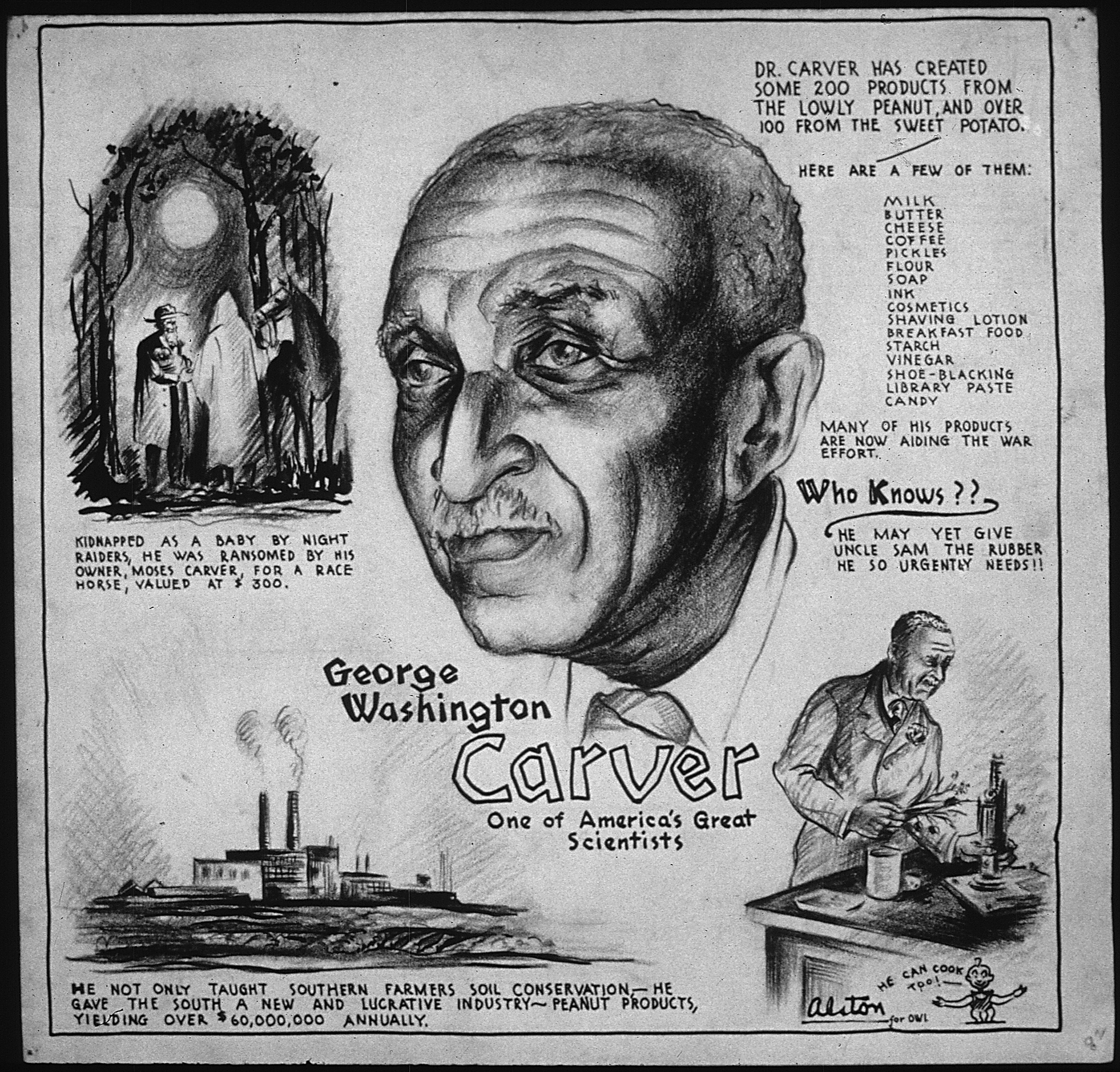
"One of America's great scientists" – one of several Carver-centric posters by C. H. Alston, this one referencing his contributions to the war effort during World War II (c. 1943)

Carver developed techniques to improve soils depleted by repeated plantings of cotton. Together with other agricultural experts, he urged farmers to restore nitrogen to their soils by practicing systematic crop rotation: alternating cotton crops with plantings of sweet potatoes or legumes, such as peanuts, soybeans and cowpeas. These crops both restored nitrogen to the soil and were good for human consumption.

Following the crop rotation practice resulted in improved cotton yields and gave farmers alternative cash crops. To train farmers to successfully rotate and cultivate the new crops, Carver developed an agricultural extension program for Alabama that was similar to the one at Iowa State. To encourage better nutrition in the South, he widely distributed recipes using the alternative crops.

He founded an industrial research laboratory, where he and assistants worked to popularize the new crops by developing hundreds of applications for them. They did original research as well as promoting applications and recipes, which they collected from others. Carver distributed his information as agricultural bulletins.

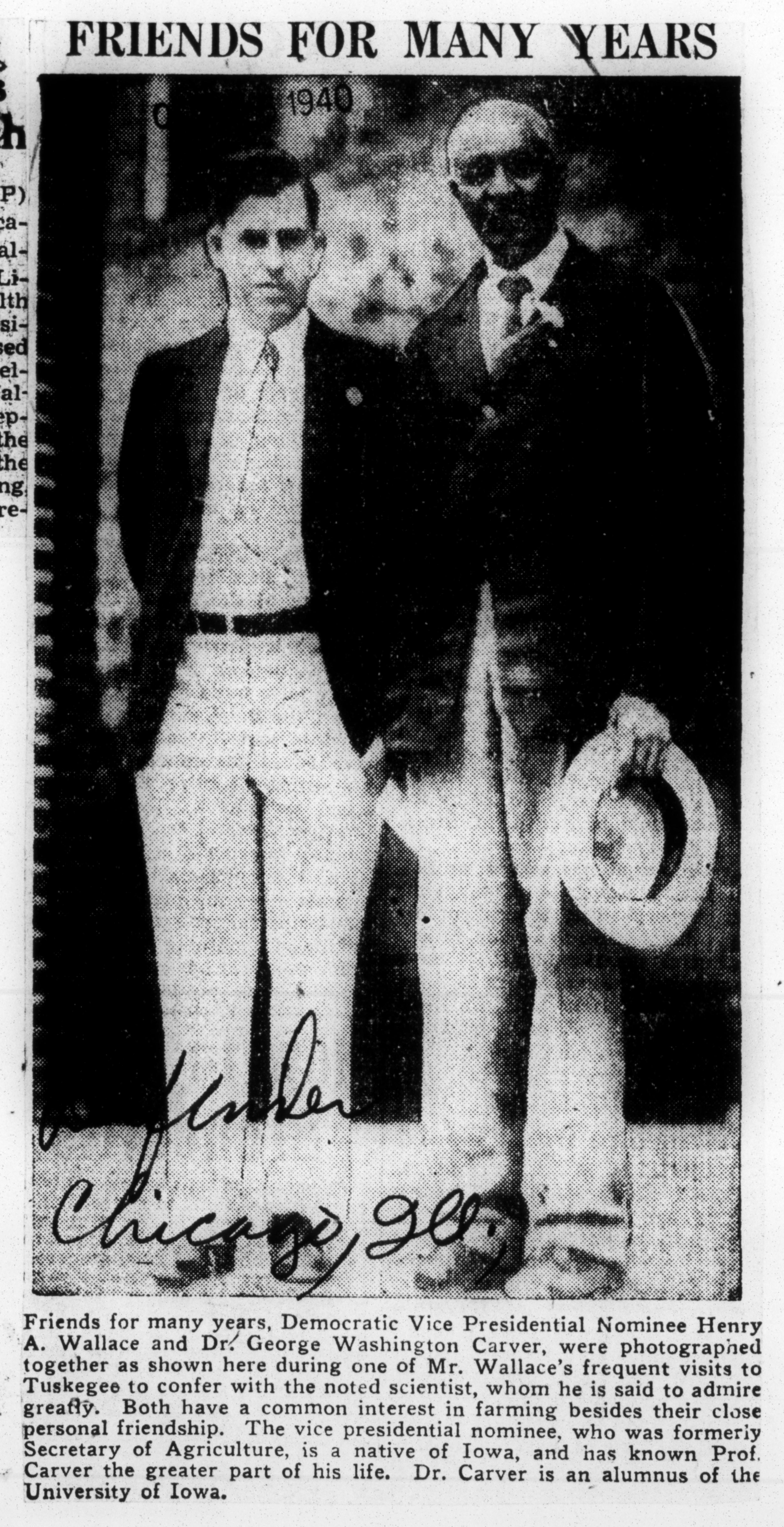
Carver and future vice president Henry A. Wallace in a clipping from The Chicago Defender

Carver's work was known by officials in the national capital before he became a public figure. President Theodore Roosevelt publicly admired his work. Former professors of Carver's from Iowa State University were appointed to positions as Secretary of Agriculture: James Wilson, a former dean and professor of Carver's, served from 1897 to 1913. Henry Cantwell Wallace served from 1921 to 1924. He knew Carver personally because his son Henry A. Wallace and the researcher were friends. The younger Wallace served as U.S. Secretary of Agriculture from 1933 to 1940, and as Franklin Delano Roosevelt's vice president from 1941 to 1945.

The American industrialist, farmer, and inventor William C. Edenborn of Winn Parish, Louisiana, grew peanuts on his demonstration farm. He consulted with Carver.

In 1916, Carver was made a member of the Royal Society of Arts in England, one of only a handful of Americans at that time to receive this honor. Carver's promotion of peanuts gained him the most notice.

By 1920, the U.S. peanut farmers were being undercut by low prices on imported peanuts from the Republic of China. In 1921, peanut farmers and industry representatives planned to appear at Congressional hearings to ask for a tariff. Based on the quality of Carver's presentation at their convention, they asked the African-American professor to testify on the tariff issue before the Ways and Means Committee of the United States House of Representatives. Due to segregation, it was highly unusual for an African American to appear as an expert witness, but Carver appeared and unpacked numerous exhibits and samples to make his case for greater food and industrial uses for the peanut. Southern congressmen mocked him, but as he talked about the importance of the peanut and its uses for American agriculture and manufacturing, committee members repeatedly extended the time for his testimony. The Fordney–McCumber Tariff was enacted in 1922, and included a duty on imported peanuts. Carver's testimony, including samples of peanut milk, peanut flour, industrial dyes made from peanuts, and other peanut-based products, made him widely known as a public figure.

== Life while famous ==
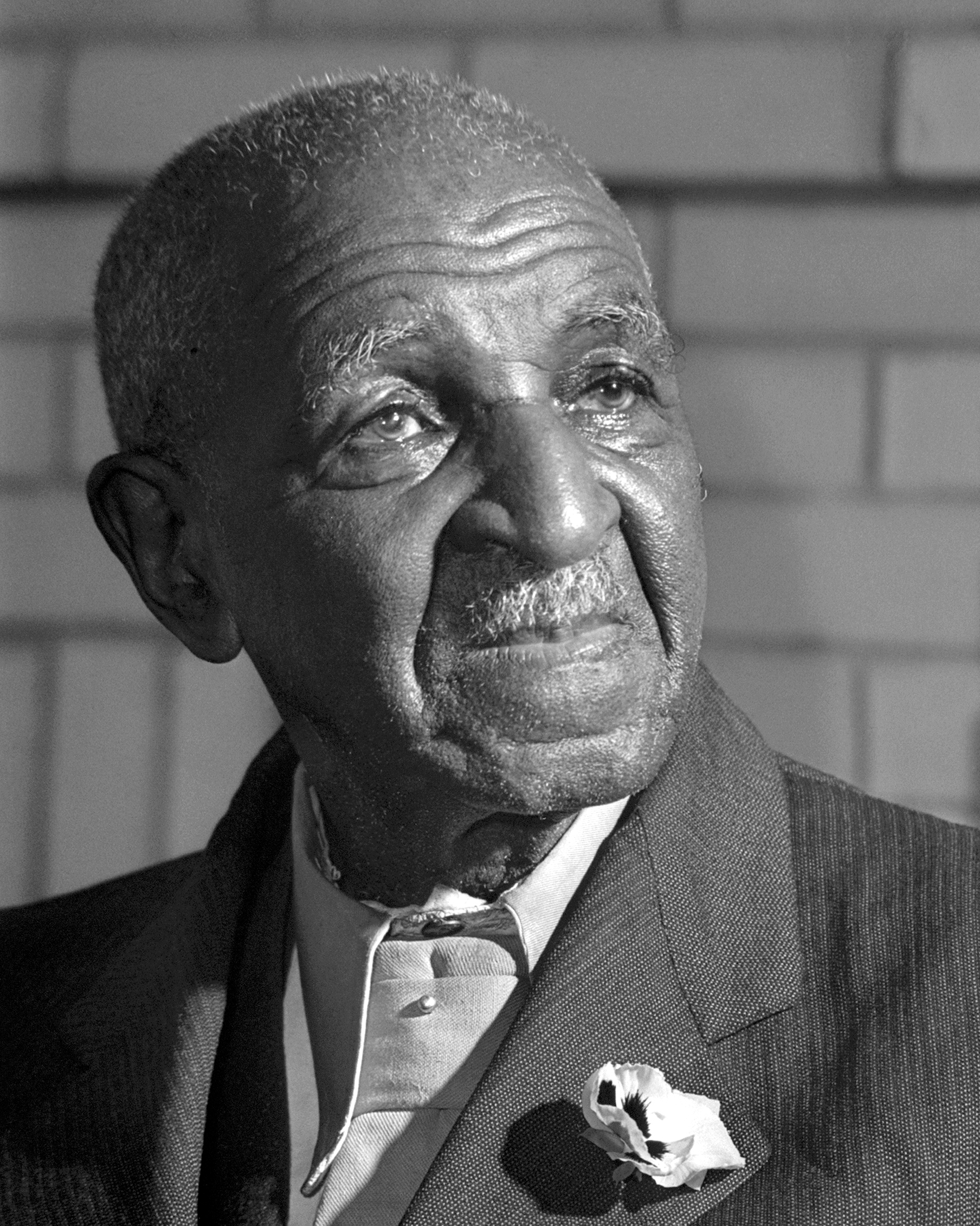
A United States Farm Security Administration portrait, March 1942

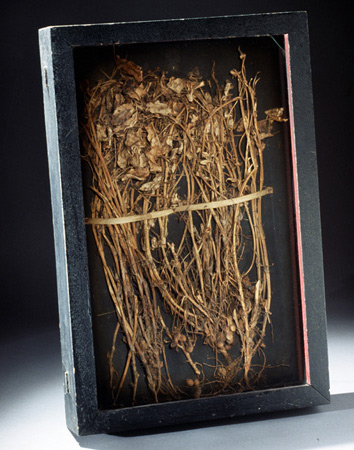
A peanut specimen collected by Carver

During the last two decades of his life, Carver seemed to enjoy his celebrity status. He was often on the road promoting Tuskegee University, peanuts, sweet potatoes, and racial harmony. Although he only published six agricultural bulletins after 1922, he published articles in peanut industry journals and wrote a syndicated newspaper column, "Professor Carver's Advice". Business leaders came to seek his help, and he often responded with free advice. Three American presidents—Theodore Roosevelt, Calvin Coolidge and Franklin D. Roosevelt—met with him, and the Crown Prince of Sweden studied with him for three weeks. From 1923 to 1933, Carver toured white Southern colleges for the Commission on Interracial Cooperation.

With his increasing notability, Carver became the subject of biographies and articles. Raleigh H. Merritt contacted him for his biography published in 1929. Merritt wrote:

At present not a great deal has been done to utilize Dr. Carver's discoveries commercially. He says that he is merely scratching the surface of scientific investigations of the possibilities of the peanut and other Southern products.

In 1932, the writer James Saxon Childers wrote that Carver and his peanut products were almost solely responsible for the rise in U.S. peanut production after the boll weevil devastated the American cotton crop beginning about 1892. His article "A Boy Who Was Traded for a Horse" (1932) in The American Magazine, and its 1937 reprint in Reader's Digest, contributed to this myth about Carver's influence. Other popular media tended to exaggerate Carver's impact on the peanut industry.

From 1933 to 1935, Carver worked to develop peanut oil massages to treat infantile paralysis (polio). Ultimately, researchers found that the massages, not the peanut oil, provided the benefits of maintaining some mobility to paralyzed limbs.

From 1935 to 1937, Carver participated in the USDA Disease Survey. Carver had specialized in plant diseases and mycology for his master's degree.

In 1937, Carver attended two chemurgy conferences, an emerging field in the 1930s, during the Great Depression and the Dust Bowl, concerned with developing new products from crops. He was invited by Henry Ford to speak at the conference held in Dearborn, Michigan, and they developed a friendship. That year Carver's health declined, and Ford later installed an elevator at the Tuskegee dormitory where Carver lived, so that the elderly man would not have to climb stairs.

== Relationships ==
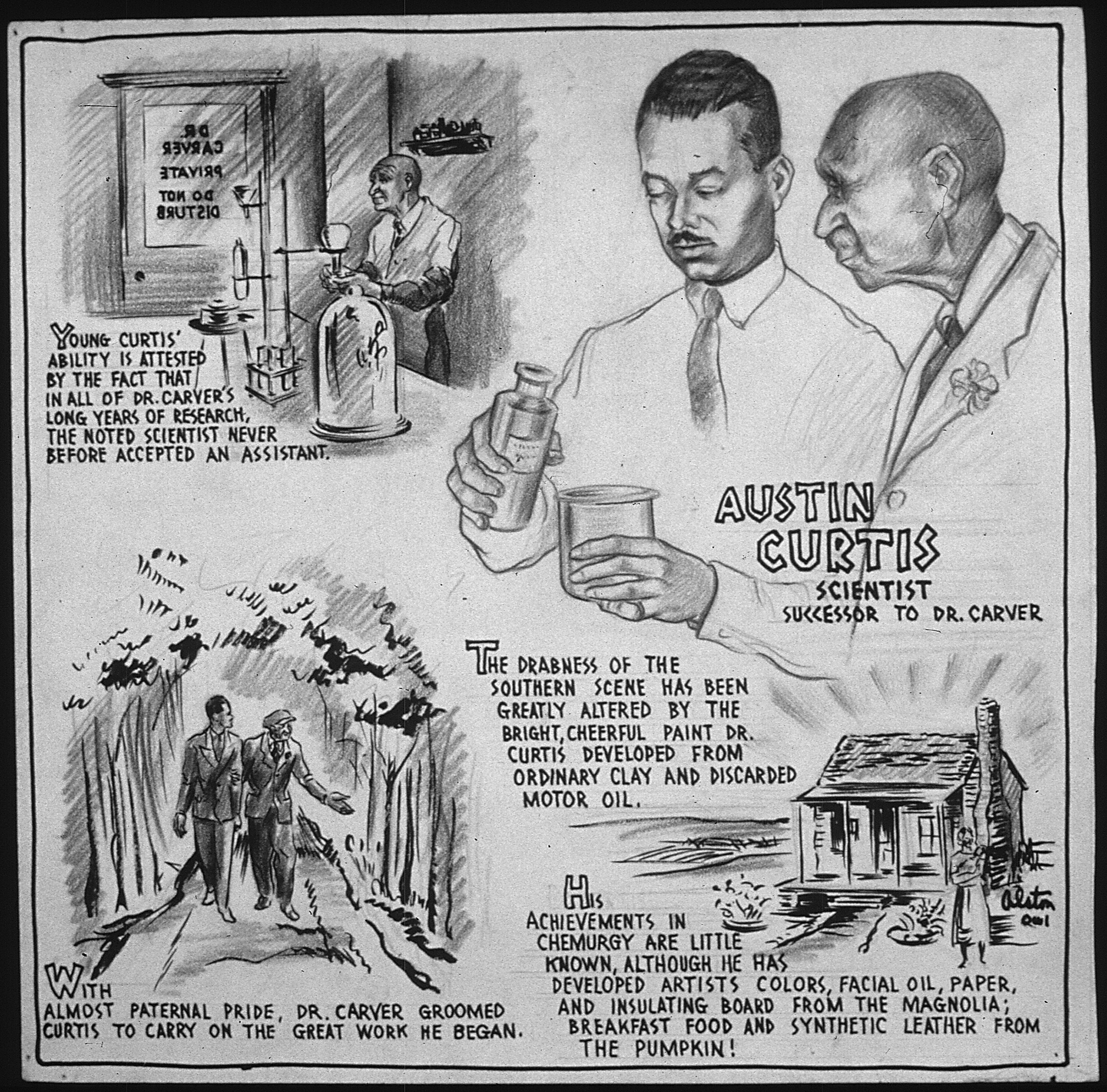
"Austin Curtis – Scientist successor to Dr. Carver", cartoon by C. H. Alston

Carver never married. At age 40, he began a courtship with Sarah L. Hunt, an elementary school teacher and the sister-in-law of Warren Logan, Treasurer of Tuskegee Institute. This lasted three years until she took a teaching job in California. In her 2015 biography, Christina Vella reviews his relationships and suggests that Carver was bisexual and constrained by mores of his historic period.

When he was 70, Carver established a friendship and research partnership with the scientist Austin W. Curtis Jr. This young black man, a graduate of Cornell University, had some teaching experience before coming to Tuskegee. Carver bequeathed to Curtis his royalties from an authorized 1943 biography by Rackham Holt. After Carver died in 1943, Curtis was fired from Tuskegee Institute. He left Alabama and resettled in Detroit. There he manufactured and sold peanut-based personal care products.

== Death ==
Upon returning home one day, Carver suffered a bad fall down a flight of stairs; he was found unconscious by a maid who took him to a hospital. Carver died January 5, 1943, at the age of 78 or 79 from complications (anemia) resulting from this fall. His death came when he was sitting up in bed while painting a Christmas card which said, "Peace on earth and goodwill to all men." Carver biographer Prema Ramakrishnan said of him that "His death was characteristic of him and his entire life's work." He was buried next to Booker T. Washington at Tuskegee University. Carver had been frugal in his life, and in his seventies he established a legacy by creating a museum of his work, as well as the George Washington Carver Foundation at Tuskegee in 1938, to continue agricultural research. He donated nearly US$60,000 (equivalent to $1,372,340 in 2025) of his savings to create the foundation.

On his grave was written, "He could have added fortune to fame, but caring for neither, he found happiness and honor in being helpful to the world."

== Personal life ==
=== Christianity ===
Carver believed he could have faith both in God and science, and he integrated them into his life. He testified on many occasions that his faith in Jesus was the only mechanism by which he could effectively pursue and perform the art of science. Carver became a Christian when he was still a young boy, as he wrote in connection to his conversion in 1931:

I was just a mere boy when converted, hardly ten years old. There isn't much of a story to it. God just came into my heart one afternoon while I was alone in the 'loft' of our big barn while I was shelling corn to carry to the mill to be ground into meal.

A dear little white boy, one of our neighbors, about my age came by one Saturday morning, and in talking and playing he told me he was going to Sunday school tomorrow morning. I was eager to know what a Sunday school was. He said they sang hymns and prayed. I asked him what prayer was and what they said. I do not remember what he said; only remember that as soon as he left I climbed up into the 'loft,' knelt down by the barrel of corn and prayed as best I could. I do not remember what I said. I only recall that I felt so good that I prayed several times before I quit.

My brother and myself were the only colored children in that neighborhood and of course, we could not go to church or Sunday school, or school of any kind.

That was my simple conversion, and I have tried to keep the faith.

— G. W. Carver; Letter to Isabelle Coleman; July 24, 1931

He was not expected to live past his 21st birthday due to failing health. He lived well past the age of 21, and his belief deepened as a result. Throughout his career, he always found friendship with other Christians. He relied on them especially when criticized by the scientific community and media regarding his research methodology.

Carver viewed faith in Jesus Christ as a means of destroying both barriers of racial disharmony and social stratification. He was as concerned with his students' character development as he was with their intellectual development. He compiled a list of "eight cardinal virtues" whose possession defines "a lady or a gentleman":

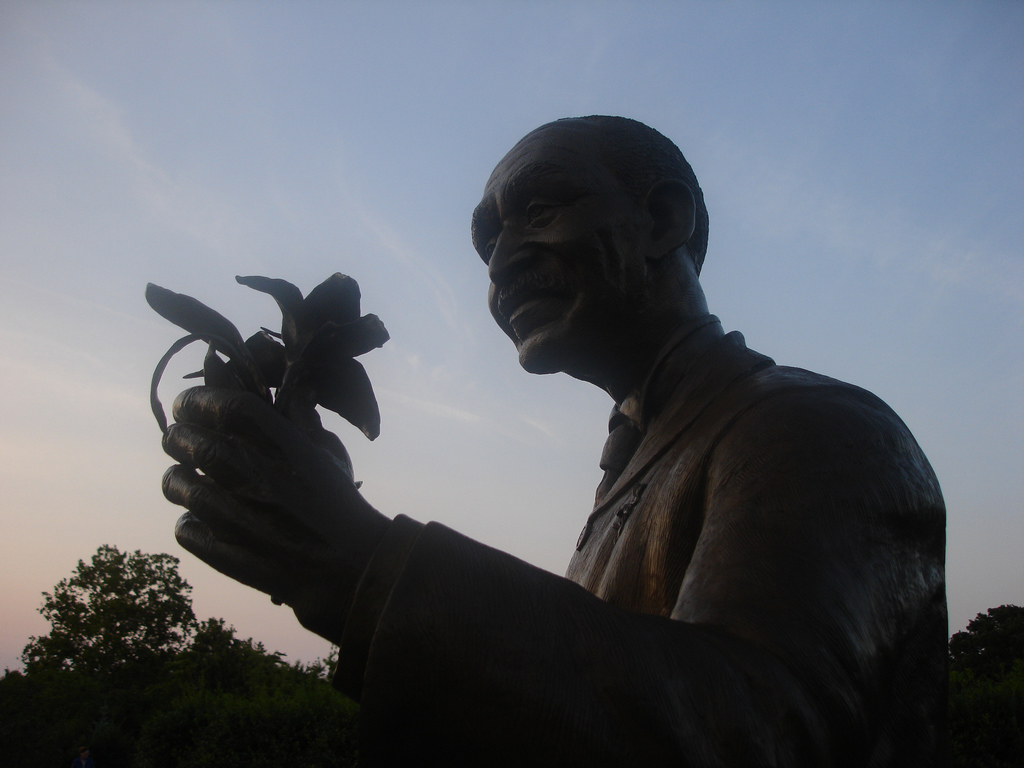
A monument to Carver at the Missouri Botanical Garden in St. Louis

- Be clean both inside and out.
- Who neither looks up to the rich nor down on the poor.
- Who loses, if needs be, without squealing.
- Who wins without bragging.
- Who is always considerate of women, children and old people.
- Who is too brave to lie.
- Who is too generous to cheat.
- Who take his share of the world and lets other people have theirs.

Beginning in 1906 at Tuskegee, Carver led a Bible class on Sundays for several students at their request. He regularly portrayed stories by acting them out.

=== Voice pitch ===
Even as an adult Carver spoke with a high pitch. Historian Linda O. McMurry noted that he "was a frail and sickly child" who suffered "from a severe case of whooping cough and frequent bouts of what was called croup". McMurry contested the diagnosis of croup, holding rather that "His stunted growth and apparently impaired vocal cords suggest instead tubercular or pneumococcal infection. Frequent infections of that nature could have caused the growth of polyps on the larynx and may have resulted from a gamma globulin deficiency. ... until his death the high pitch of his voice startled all who met him, and he suffered from frequent chest congestion and loss of voice."

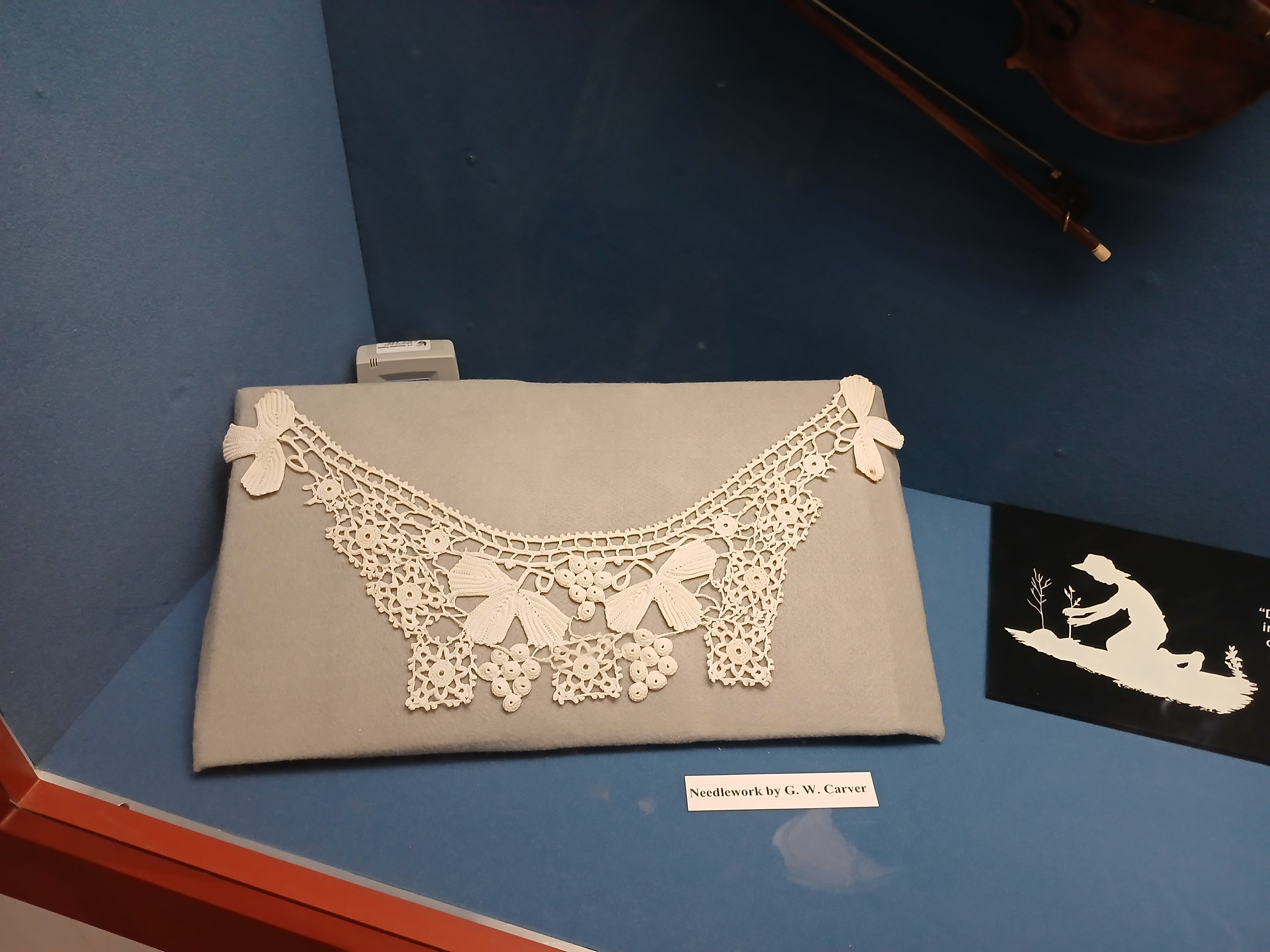
George Washington Carver - lace made by George Washington Carver

=== Textile hobby ===
Carver was an ardent crochet practitioner, and samples of his work have been displayed and are archived today. In 1941, an exhibit of his work was available at the George Washington Carver Museum in Tuskegee. Many examples of lace style edgings and doily items were shown. These samples remain in the collection of the Tuskegee Institute National Historic Site.

== Honors ==
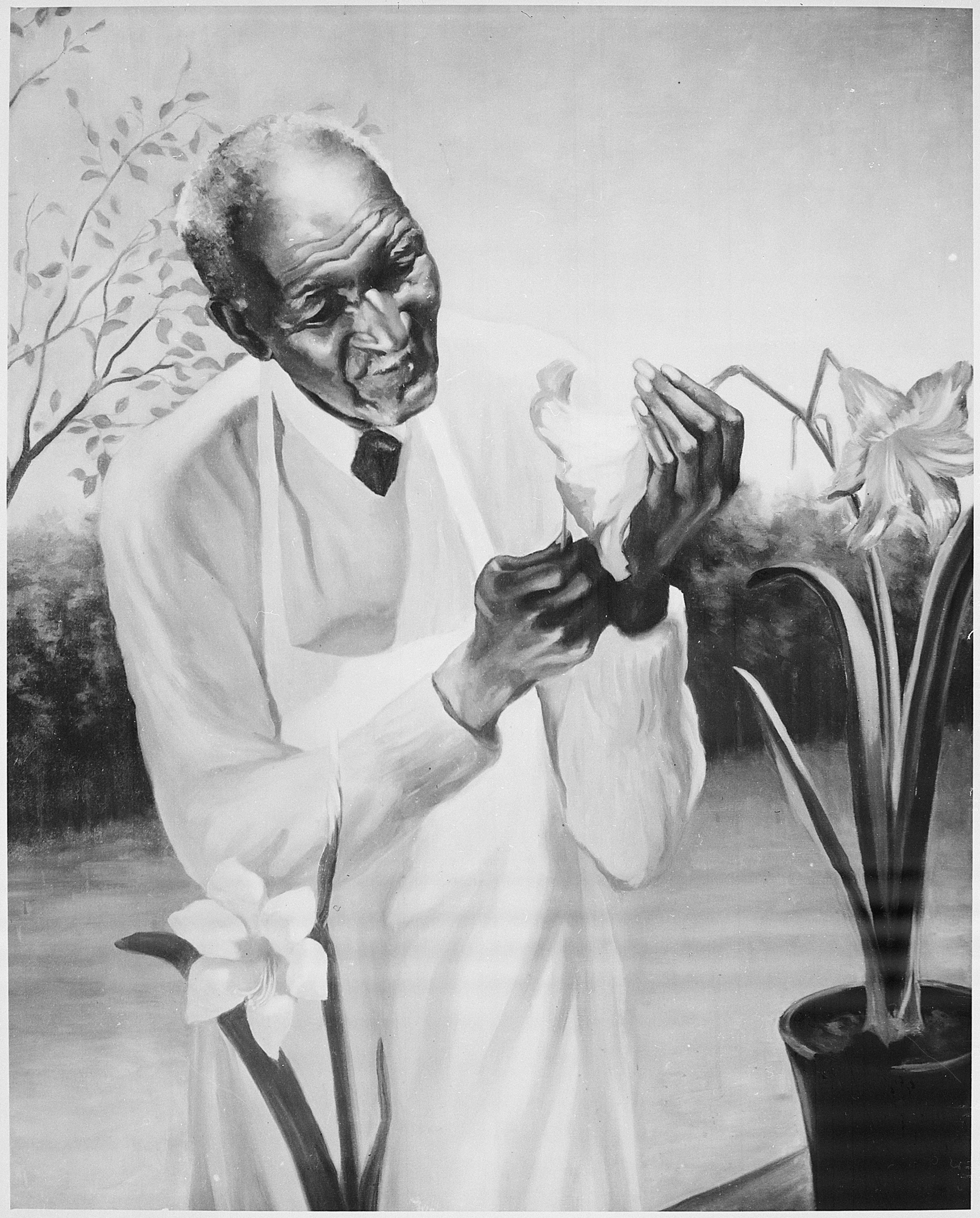
A painting by Betsy Graves Reyneau

- 1923, Spingarn Medal from the NAACP, awarded annually for outstanding achievement.
- 1928, honorary doctorate from Simpson College
- 1939, the Roosevelt Medal for Outstanding Contribution to Southern Agriculture
- 1940, Carver established the George Washington Carver Foundation at the Tuskegee Institute.
- 1941, George Washington Carver Museum was dedicated at the Tuskegee Institute.
- 1942, Ford built a replica of Carver's birth cabin at the Henry Ford Museum and Greenfield Village in Dearborn as a tribute.
- 1942, Ford dedicated a laboratory in Dearborn named after Carver.
- 1943, Liberty ship SS George Washington Carver launched
- 1943?, the US Congress designated January 5, the anniversary of his death, as George Washington Carver Recognition Day.
- 1947, George Washington Carver Area High School, named in his honor is opened by the Chicago Public Schools in the Riverdale/Far South Side area of Chicago, Illinois, United States.
- 1950, George Washington Carver State Park named
- 1951–1954, U.S. Mint features Carver on a 50 cents silver commemorative coin
- 1965, Ballistic missile submarine USS George Washington Carver (SSBN-656) launched.
- 1969, Iowa State University constructs Carver Hall in honor of Carver—a graduate of the university.
- 1970, Carver crater on the far side of the Moon was named after him.
- 1999, USDA names a portion of its Beltsville, Maryland, campus the George Washington Carver Center.
- 2002, Iowa Award, the state's highest citizen award.
- 2004, George Washington Carver Bridge, Des Moines, Iowa
- 2007, the Missouri Botanical Gardens has a garden area named in his honor, with a commemorative statue and material about his work
- 2022, Gov. Kim Reynolds signed legislation naming Feb. 1 every year as George Washington Carver Day in Iowa
- Willowbrook Neighborhood Park in Willowbrook, California was renamed George Washington Carver Park in his honor.
- Schools named for Carver include the George Washington Carver Elementary School of the Compton Unified School District in Los Angeles County, California, the George Washington Carver School of Arts and Science of the Sacramento City Unified School District in Sacramento, California, and the Dr. George Washington Carver Elementary School, a Newark public school in Newark, New Jersey.
- Taxa named after him include: Colletotrichum carveri and Metasphaeria carveri, both named by Job Bicknell Ellis and Benjamin Matlack Everhart in 1902; Cercospora carveriana, named by Pier Andrea Saccardo and Domenico Saccardo in 1906; Taphrina carveri named by Anna Eliza Jenkins in 1939; and Pestalotia carveri, named by E. F. Guba in 1961.
- 2025, The Montgomery Biscuits will take on the alternate identity of the "Alabama Peanut Runners" for two games on August 28 and 31, 2025, as a tribute to George Washington Carver and his pioneering work with peanuts.

== Legacy ==
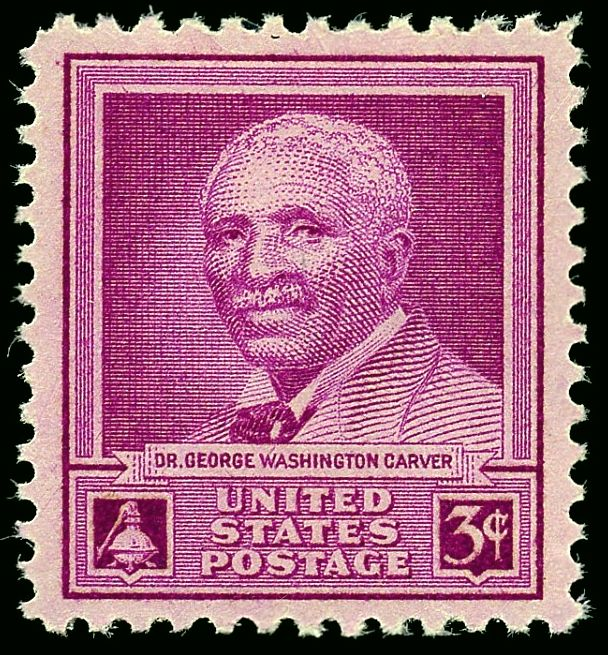
In 1948, the U.S. government released a commemorative stamp issued on Carver's birthday, five years after his death.

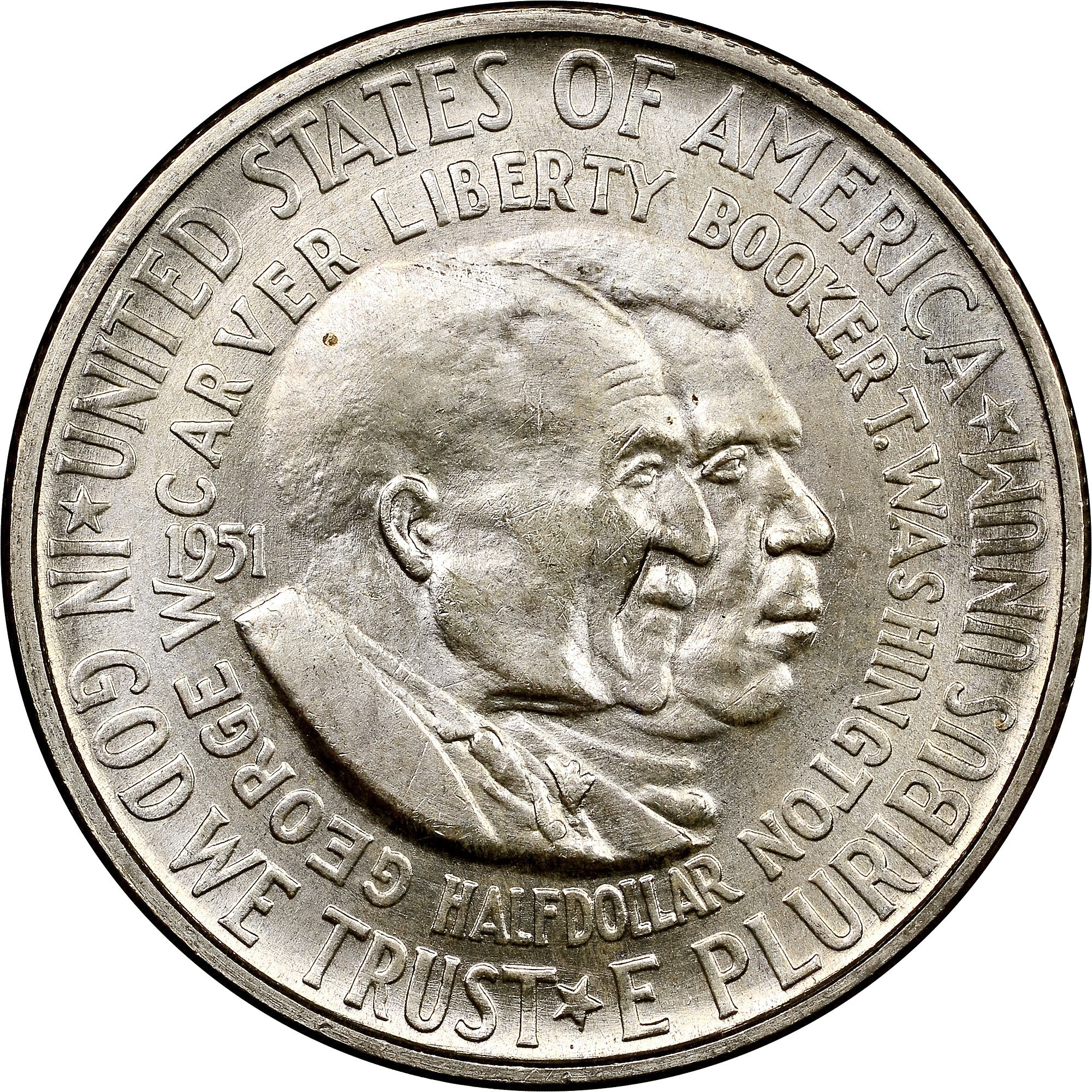
A 1951 Carver-Washington commemorative half dollar

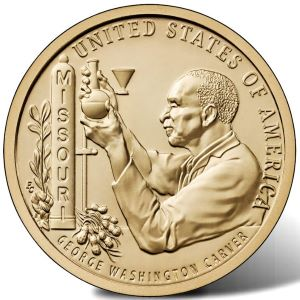
Carver is featured on the reverse of Missouri's 2024 American Innovation dollar.

A movement to establish a U.S. national monument to Carver began before his death. Because of World War II, such non-war expenditures had been banned by presidential order. Missouri senator Harry S. Truman sponsored a bill in favor of a monument. In a committee hearing on the bill, one supporter said:

The bill is not simply a momentary pause on the part of busy men engaged in the conduct of the war, to do honor to one of the truly great Americans of this country, but it is in essence a blow against the Axis, it is in essence a war measure in the sense that it will further unleash and release the energies of roughly 15,000,000 Negro people in this country for full support of our war effort.

The bill passed unanimously in both houses.

On July 14, 1943, President Franklin D. Roosevelt dedicated $30,000 (~$445,783 in 2025) for the George Washington Carver National Monument west-southwest of Diamond, Missouri, the area where Carver had spent time in his childhood. This was the first national monument dedicated to an African American and the first to honor someone other than a president. The 210-acre (0.8 km^{2}) national monument complex includes a bust of Carver, a 3/4-mile nature trail, a museum, the 1881 Moses Carver house, and the Carver cemetery. The national monument opened in July 1953.

In December 1947, a fire broke out in the Carver Museum, and much of the collection was damaged. Time magazine reported that all but 3 of the 48 Carver paintings at the museum were destroyed. His best-known painting, displayed at the World's Columbian Exposition of 1893 in Chicago, depicts a yucca and cactus. This canvas survived and has undergone conservation. It is displayed together with several of his other paintings. Carver was featured on a U.S. 1948 3 cent commemorative stamp. From 1951 to 1954, he was depicted on the commemorative Carver-Washington half dollar coin along with Booker T. Washington. A second stamp honoring Carver, of face value 32¢, was issued on February 3, 1998, as part of the Celebrate the Century stamp sheet series. Two ships, the Liberty ship SS George Washington Carver and the nuclear submarine USS George Washington Carver (SSBN-656), were named in his honor.

In 1977, Carver was elected to the Hall of Fame for Great Americans. In 1990, he was inducted into the National Inventors Hall of Fame. In 1994, Iowa State University awarded Carver a Doctor of Humane Letters. In 2000, Carver was a charter inductee in the USDA Hall of Heroes as the "Father of Chemurgy".

Many institutions continue to honor George Washington Carver. Dozens of elementary schools and high schools are named after him. National Basketball Association star David Robinson and his wife, Valerie, founded an academy named after Carver; it opened on September 17, 2001, in San Antonio, Texas. The Carver Community Cultural Center, a historic center located in San Antonio, is named for him.

In 2002, scholar Molefi Kete Asante listed George Washington Carver as one of 100 Greatest African Americans.

In 2005, Carver's research at the Tuskegee Institute was designated a National Historic Chemical Landmark by the American Chemical Society. On February 15, 2005, an episode of Modern Marvels included scenes from within Iowa State University's Food Sciences Building and about Carver's work. In 2005, the Missouri Botanical Garden in St. Louis, Missouri, opened a George Washington Carver garden in his honor, which includes a life-size statue of him.

A color film of Carver shot around 1937 by African American surgeon C. Allen Alexander was added to the National Film Registry of the Library of Congress in 2019. The 12 minutes of footage were taken at the Tuskegee Institute, and includes Carver in his apartment, office and laboratory, as well as scenes of him tending flowers and displaying his paintings.

=== Impact on the Black diaspora ===
George Washington Carver has heavily influenced the science, technology, engineering and mathematics industry (STEAM) and the Black diaspora as a whole. Carver made sure black farmers knew the foundation and strategies when finding and maintaining their crops. His widely noticed impact with peanuts even brought black and white communities together due his farming strategies being essential for both races as he was working towards racial equality. Institutions all over the world such as Tuskegee University, and STEAM programs in different parts of the world continue to center Carver as a role model for his bravery, inventions, and combining science and agriculture with black empowerment. He was not just "The Peanut Man", but he was a pioneer who used his ability to understand science and agriculture as a way to educate and uplift the Black Diaspora.

Carver's methods and discoveries surrounding farming promote environmental awareness, economic opportunity, and black excellence within STEAM. Traditions that Carver taught farmers are still taught and used as cooking, and technological strategies today. Examples include Carver learning how to turn sweet potatoes into flour, writing ink, and vinegar, emphasizing that crops can be interpreted in so many ways. Through these innovations, African American farmers learned different methods that helped them create businesses, and sustainable farming techniques which help reshape agriculture in the South and become noticed all over the world, even taught in schools today.

During an era of intense racial injustice, Carver became one of the most noticed and highly admired scientists in the world. Overturning a world of racism and discrimination, he used his platform to educate people amongst the diaspora, and to advocate for equal rights. The outstanding accomplishments landed the scientist a lot of friendships, such as Franklin D. Roosevelt, and Henry Ford. Carver became friends with Mahatma Gandhi, flying to India to converse and educate Gandhi on nutrition to improve his health.

== Reputed inventions ==
Carver has been given credit in popular folklore for many inventions that did not come out of his lab. Three patents (one for cosmetics; US 1522176, issued January 6, 1925, and two for paints and stains; US 1541478, issued June 9, 1925, and US 1632365, issued June 14, 1927) were issued to Carver in 1925 to 1927; however, they were not commercially successful.

Aside from these patents and some recipes for food, Carver left no records of formulae or procedures for making his products. He did not keep a laboratory notebook. Mackintosh notes that, "Carver did not explicitly claim that he had personally discovered all the peanut attributes and uses he cited, but he said nothing to prevent his audiences from drawing the inference."

Carver's research was intended to produce replacements from common crops for commercial products, which were generally beyond the budget of the small one-horse farmer. A misconception grew that his research on products for subsistence farmers were developed by others commercially to change Southern agriculture. Carver's work to provide small farmers with resources for more independence from the cash economy foreshadowed the "appropriate technology" work of E. F. Schumacher.

=== Peanut products ===
Dennis Keeney, director of the Leopold Center for Sustainable Agriculture at Iowa State University, wrote in the Leopold Letter (newsletter):

Carver worked on improving soils, growing crops with low inputs, and using species that fixed nitrogen (hence, the work on the cowpea and the peanut). Carver wrote in 'The Need of Scientific Agriculture in the South': "The virgin fertility of our soils and the vast amount of unskilled labor have been more of a curse than a blessing to agriculture. This exhaustive system for cultivation, the destruction of forest, the rapid and almost constant decomposition of organic matter, have made our agricultural problem one requiring more brains than of the North, East or West.

Carver worked for years to create a company to market his products. The most important was the Carver Penol Company, which sold a mixture of creosote and peanuts as a patent medicine for respiratory diseases such as tuberculosis. Sales were lackluster and the product was ineffective according to the Food and Drug Administration. Other ventures were The Carver Products Company and the Carvoline Company. Carvoline Antiseptic Hair Dressing was a mix of peanut oil and lanolin. Carvoline Rubbing Oil was a peanut oil for massages.

Carver is often mistakenly credited with the invention of peanut butter. By the time Carver published "How to Grow the Peanut and 105 Ways of Preparing it For Human Consumption" in 1916, many methods of preparation of peanut butter had been developed or patented by various pharmacists, doctors and food scientists working in the US and Canada. The Aztecs were known to have made peanut butter from ground peanuts as early as the 15th century. Canadian pharmacist Marcellus Gilmore Edson was awarded U.S. patent 306,727 (for its manufacture) in 1884, 12 years before Carver began his work at Tuskegee.

=== Sweet potato products ===
Carver is also associated with developing sweet potato products. In his 1922 sweet potato bulletin, Carver listed a few dozen recipes, "many of which I have copied verbatim from Bulletin No. 129, U. S. Department of Agriculture". Carver's records included the following sweet potato products: 73 dyes, 17 wood fillers, 14 candies, 5 library pastes, 5 breakfast foods, 4 starches, 4 flours, and 3 molasses. He also had listings for vinegars, dry coffee and instant coffee, candy, after-dinner mints, orange drops, and lemon drops.

== Carver bulletins ==
During his more than four decades at Tuskegee, Carver's official published work consisted mainly of 44 practical bulletins for farmers. His first bulletin in 1898 was on feeding acorns to farm animals. His final bulletin in 1943 was about the peanut. He also published six bulletins on sweet potatoes, five on cotton, and four on cowpeas. Some other individual bulletins dealt with alfalfa, wild plum, tomato, ornamental plants, corn, poultry, dairying, hogs, preserving meats in hot weather, and nature study in schools.

His most popular bulletin, How to Grow the Peanut and 105 Ways of Preparing it for Human Consumption, was first published in 1916 and has been reprinted numerous times. It provides a short overview of peanut crop production and contains a list of recipes from other agricultural bulletins, cookbooks, magazines, and newspapers, such as the Peerless Cookbook, Good Housekeeping, and Berry's Fruit Recipes. While Carver's was not the first American agricultural bulletin devoted to peanuts, his bulletins seem to have been more popular and widespread than those that preceded his.

== See also ==
- African-American history
- Black homesteaders
- Carver College
- Carver Academy, Texas
- Carver Court, a historic housing development in Chester County, Pennsylvania
- George Washington Carver Center for Arts and Technology, a public high school in Towson, Maryland
- Carver High School (disambiguation)
- Carver Junior College, Cocoa, Florida, closed in 1963
- Carver Middle School (disambiguation)
- List of people on stamps of the United States

== General references ==
=== Scholarly studies ===
- Mackintosh, Barry. "George Washington Carver: The Making of a Myth". Journal of Southern History 42#4 (1976): 507–528. in JSTOR
- Barry Mackintosh, "George Washington Carver and the Peanut: New Light on a Much-loved Myth", American Heritage 28(5): 66–73, 1977.
- McMurry, L. O. "Carver, George Washington". American National Biography Online February 2000
- McMurry, Linda O. George Washington Carver: Scientist and Symbol (Oxford University Press, 1982). online

=== Popular works ===
- Carver, George Washington. "1897 or Thereabouts: George Washington Carver's Own Brief History of His Life". George Washington Carver National Monument.
- Collins, David R. George Washington Carver: Man's Slave, God's Scientist, (Mott Media, 1981)
- William J. Federer, George Washington Carver: His Life & Faith in His Own Words, AmeriSearch (2003) ISBN 0-9653557-6-4
- Kremer, G. R. ed. George Washington Carver: In His Own Words, University of Missouri Press; 1987, Reprint edition (1991) ISBN 978-0-8262-0785-2
- H. M. Morris, Men of Science, Men of God (1982)
- E. C. Barnett and D. Fisher, Scientists Who Believe (1984)
