= Diamond Grove Prairie Conservation Area =

Protected area in Missouri, US

- IUCN category V (protected landscape/seascape)
- Location within Missouri Location within the United States
- Location: Newton County, Missouri
- Nearest city: Joplin, Missouri
- Coordinates: 37.0064°N 94.3492°W
- Area: 852 acres (345 ha)
- Established: 1982
- Governing body: Missouri Department of Conservation

The Diamond Grove Prairie Conservation Area is an 852-acre natural area located adjacent to the Missouri municipality of Diamond. The conservation area is characterized by rolling tallgrass prairie and prairie savanna. The conservation area is located relatively near, although not adjacent to, the George Washington Carver National Monument. It shows the landscape that was familiar to the Carver family group in the 1860s, the time of the American Civil War.

The Diamond Grove Prairie Conservation Area is maintained under the jurisdiction of the Missouri Department of Conservation (MDOC). MDOC maintains the property parcels that make up the conservation area for outdoor enjoyments, hiking, shotgun hunting, and deer hunting. The 1997 Smithsonian Guides to Natural America series describes Diamond Grove Prairie as a place of "superb wildflower displays".
