= SS George Washington Carver =

World War II Liberty ship of the United States

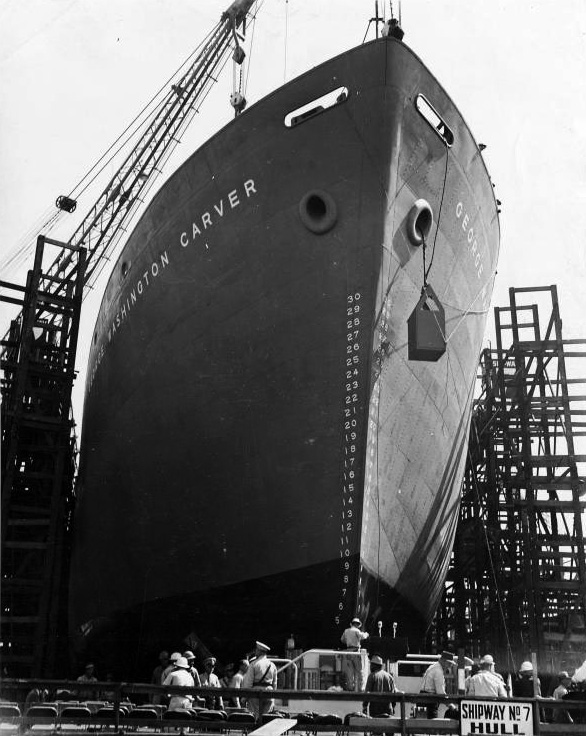
- SS George Washington Carver slides down the shipway after launching on 7 May 1943

History

United States
- Name: George Washington Carver
- Namesake: George Washington Carver
- Owner: United States Maritime Commission
- Operator: American South African Line (Farrell Lines), Inc.
- Builder: Permanente Metals Corp.
- Yard number: No. 1; Richmond, California
- Way number: 7
- Laid down: 12 April 1943
- Launched: 7 May 1943
- Sponsored by: Lena Horne
- In service: after 24 May 1943
- Out of service: 23 November 1943
- Fate: Transferred to the War Department

United States
- Name: USAHS Dogwood
- Namesake: the dogwood flower
- Owner: War Department
- Operator: Army Transportation Service
- Acquired: 23 November 1943
- Refit: Atlantic Basin Iron Works, Nov. 1943 – July 1944
- In service: July 1944
- Out of service: March 1947
- Renamed: USAT George Washington Carver, January 1946
- Home port: Charleston; Los Angeles; Seattle
- Fate: Sold for scrapping, 1964

General characteristics
- Class & type: Liberty ship; type EC2-S-C1, standard
- Tonnage: 7,176 GRT, 10,865 DWT
- Displacement: 14,245 long tons (14,474 t)
- Length: 441 feet 6 inches (135 m) oa; 416 feet (127 m) pp; 427 feet (130 m) lwl
- Beam: 57 feet (17 m)
- Draft: 27 ft 9.25 in (8.4646 m)
- Propulsion: 1 × triple-expansion steam engine, 1 × screw propeller
- Speed: 11.5 knots (21.3 km/h; 13.2 mph)
- Capacity: 562,608 cubic feet (15,931 m^{3}) (grain); 499,573 cubic feet (14,146 m^{3}) (bale)
- Complement: 38–62 USMM; 21–40 USNAG
- Armament: Varied by ship; Bow-mounted 3-inch (76 mm)/50-caliber gun; Stern-mounted 4-inch (102 mm)/50-caliber gun; 2–8 × single 20-millimeter (0.79 in) Oerlikon anti-aircraft (AA) cannons and/or, 2–8 × 37-millimeter (1.46 in) M1 AA guns

Differences as USAHS Dogwood:
- Tonnage: 7,933 gross tons
- Range: 21,000 nautical miles (39,000 km; 24,000 mi)
- Capacity: 597 patients
- Armament: None

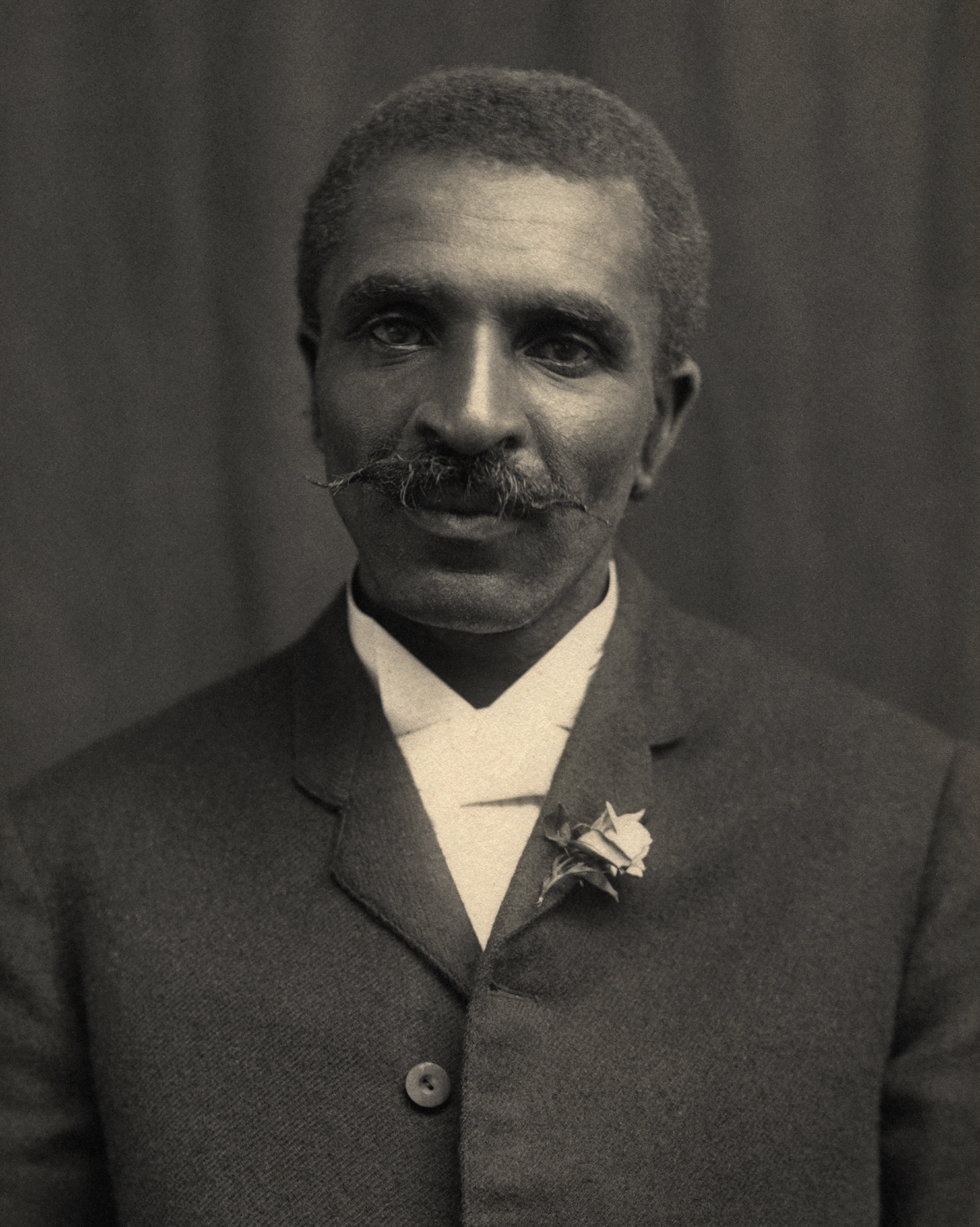
Botanist George Washington Carver

SS George Washington Carver was a Liberty ship built for the United States Maritime Commission during World War II. The ship was named in honor of George Washington Carver, and was the second Liberty ship named for an African American.

The ship was initially assigned by the War Shipping Administration (WSA) to the American South African Line (Farrell Lines), Inc. for merchant service. In November 1943 the ship was allocated to the United States Army by the WSA and was converted to hospital ship USAHS Dogwood. The ship made multiple trips to ports in England from its homeport of Charleston, South Carolina, before sailing for duty in the Philippines in 1945.

In January 1946, the ship was converted to carry a combination of troops and military dependents as USAT George Washington Carver. The ship was laid up in the National Defense Reserve Fleet in 1947 and was sold for scrapping in 1964.

== History ==
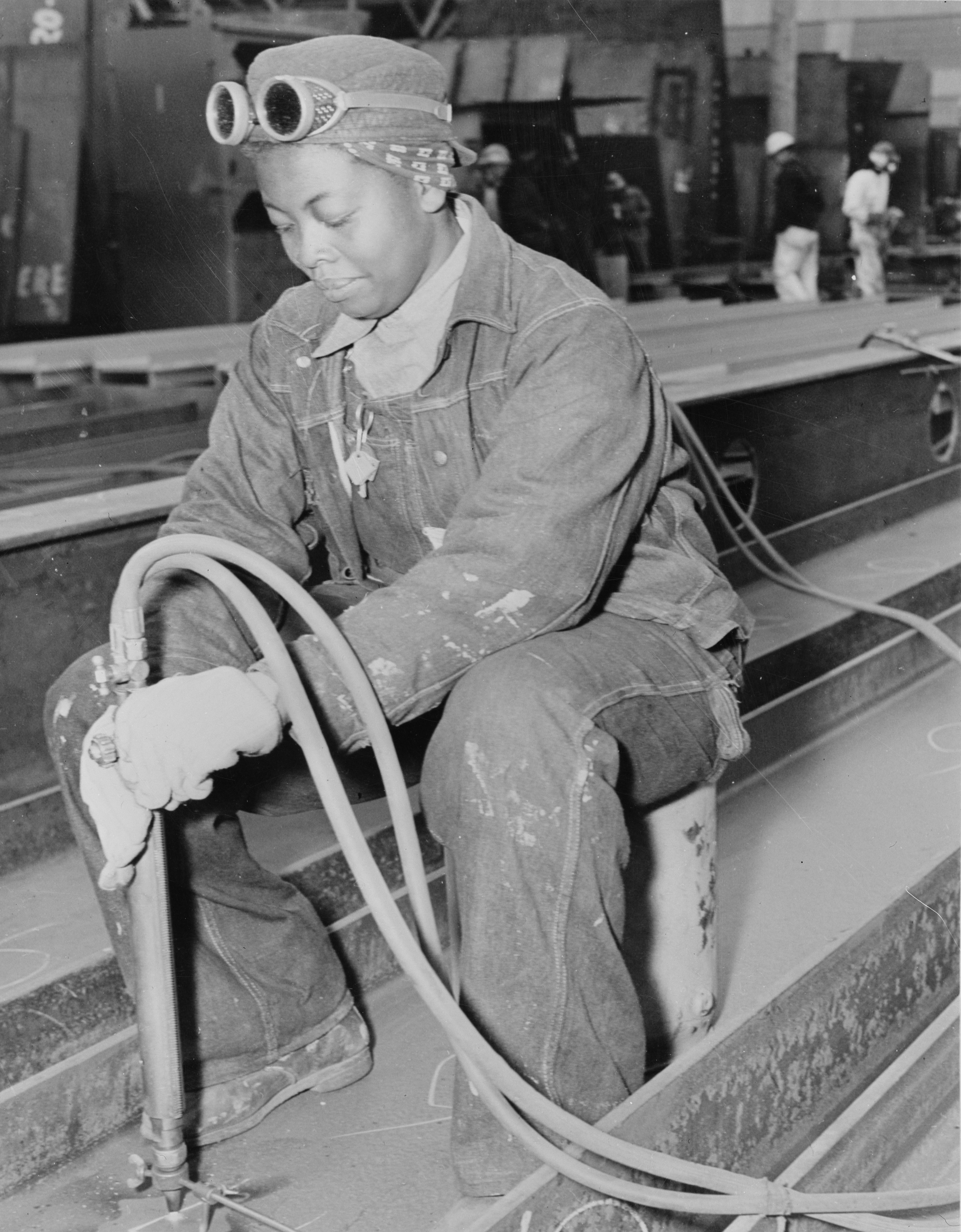
Anna Bland is shown at work on George Washington Carver in April 1943. This photo was one of a series taken on behalf of the Office of War Information documenting the work of African Americans for the war effort. (photo by E. F. Joseph)

=== Construction ===
SS George Washington Carver (MC Hull No. 542) was laid down on 12 April 1943 on shipway 7 at Yard No. 1 by Permanente Metals Corp. of Richmond, California, as a standard Liberty ship. The ship was launched on 7 May 1943 and sponsored by Lena Horne, and delivered 24 May 1943, taking 42 days from start to delivery.

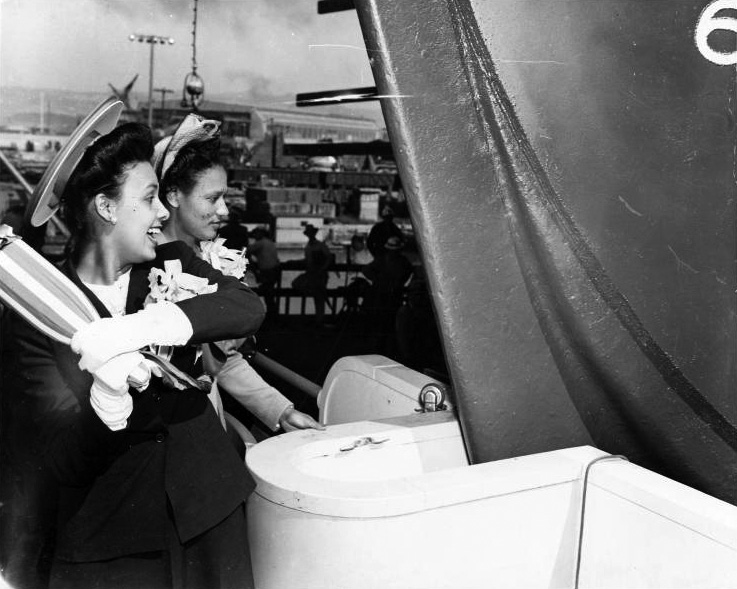
Lena Horne, sponsor of George Washington Carver, prepares to swing the champagne bottle at the launching of the Liberty ship, 7 May 1943. The woman at Horne's left may be Beatrice Turner, the matron-of-honor of the launching, and the first African American female welder hired by the Richmond Shipyards

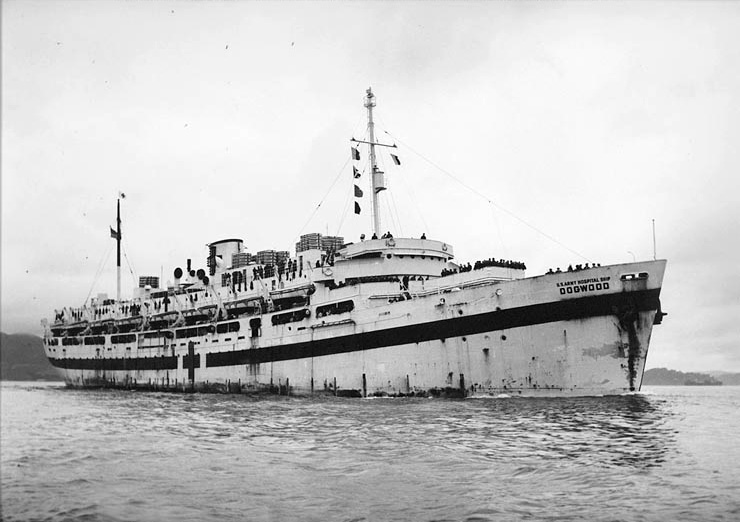
USAHS Dogwood under way in San Francisco Bay, c. January 1946

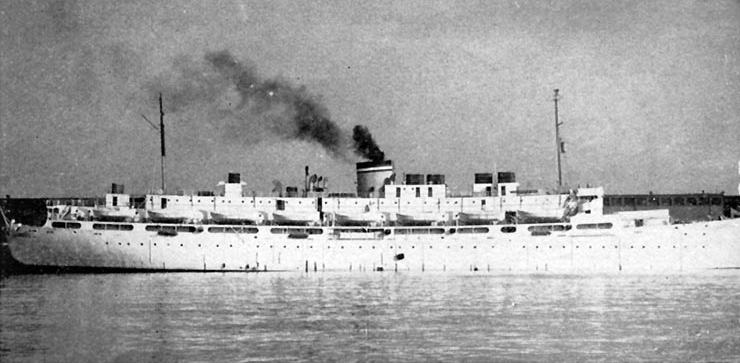
USAT George Washington Carver in 1946

During the ship's construction, photographer E. F. Joseph, on behalf of the Office of War Information, took a series of photographs showing predominantly African American men and women working on George Washington Carver.

==== Launching ceremony ====
A crowd of 1,500 gathered to watch the launching of George Washington Carver on 7 May 1943. The ceremonies were organized by the United Negro Labor Committee, and that organization's president, C. L. Dellums, spoke to crowd. Lena Horne, on a break from filming Stormy Weather, was the sponsor, and welder Beatrice Turner, the first African American female hired at the Richmond Shipyards, was the matron of honor. Bill "Bojangles" Robinson, Horne's Stormy Weather co-star, and actresses Dorothy Dandridge and Etta Moten were all scheduled to be in attendance at the event. The Carver was the second Liberty ship – out of a then-planned series of three – named for an African American and the 90th ship launched at the No. 1 yard in Richmond.

=== Merchant service ===
The ship was assigned by the WSA to the American South African Line (Farrell Lines) for merchant operation in the Mediterranean. The ship made convoy runs from Alexandria to Malta in September 1943, and from Alexandria to Bizerte the following month. From Bizerte the ship headed to Hampton Roads, Virginia, arriving there on 6 November 1943.

On 23 November 1943, after her brief civilian career, the WSA transferred the ship to the War Department for U.S. Army use as a hospital ship.

=== U.S. Army service ===
From November 1943 to July 1944 the ship underwent conversion to a Hague Convention hospital ship at the Atlantic Basin Iron Works yard in New York. During this time the ship was assigned the name USAHS Dogwood by recommendation of the Surgeon General.

Dogwood embarked on her first trip as a hospital ship in late July 1944 and returned to her new homeport of Charleston in August. The ship made six transatlantic round trips, usually calling at Avonmouth, Liverpool, and the Mersey, before being ordered to the Pacific.

In May 1945, Dogwood transited the Panama Canal and sailed directly to the Philippines, arriving at Leyte and Manila there in late June. She steamed on to Biak, Hollandia, and back to Manila. In August the ship made another circuit to Biak, Hollandia, and Finschhafen before heading to Los Angeles. Departing there for Manila again in November, the hospital ship returned stateside, putting in at San Francisco in January 1946.

The ship was no longer needed as a hospital ship at that time and put into the Marine Repair Shop at the San Francisco Port of Embarkation for conversion to carry a combination of troops and military dependents. During this interval, the ship reverted to her original name as USAT George Washington Carver. After the work was completed, the ship departed for her new homeport of Seattle.

The ship was assigned to duty between Seattle and ports in Alaska. George Washington Carver's first voyage in this role took her to Dutch Harbor, Shemya, Attu, Adak, Whittier, with a return to Seattle. A second voyage, in late March 1946, had the ship visit Anchorage, Seward, Dutch Harbor, Adak, Amchitka, Shemya, Adak a second time, eventually returning to Seattle. The ship continued on similar runs into 1947.

On 21 March 1947, George Washington Carver entered the National Defense Reserve Fleet at Suisun Bay, California. On 9 January 1964 the ship was withdrawn by First Steel & Ship Corp. for scrapping.
