= Diamond Grove, Virginia =

Unincorporated community in Virginia, United States

Coordinates: 36°42′32″N 77°56′13″W

Diamond Grove is an unincorporated community located in Brunswick County, in the U.S. state of Virginia.
