= George Washington Carver Museum (Tuskegee, Alabama) =

Museum in Tuskegee, Alabama

Coordinates: 32°25′47″N 85°42′24″W

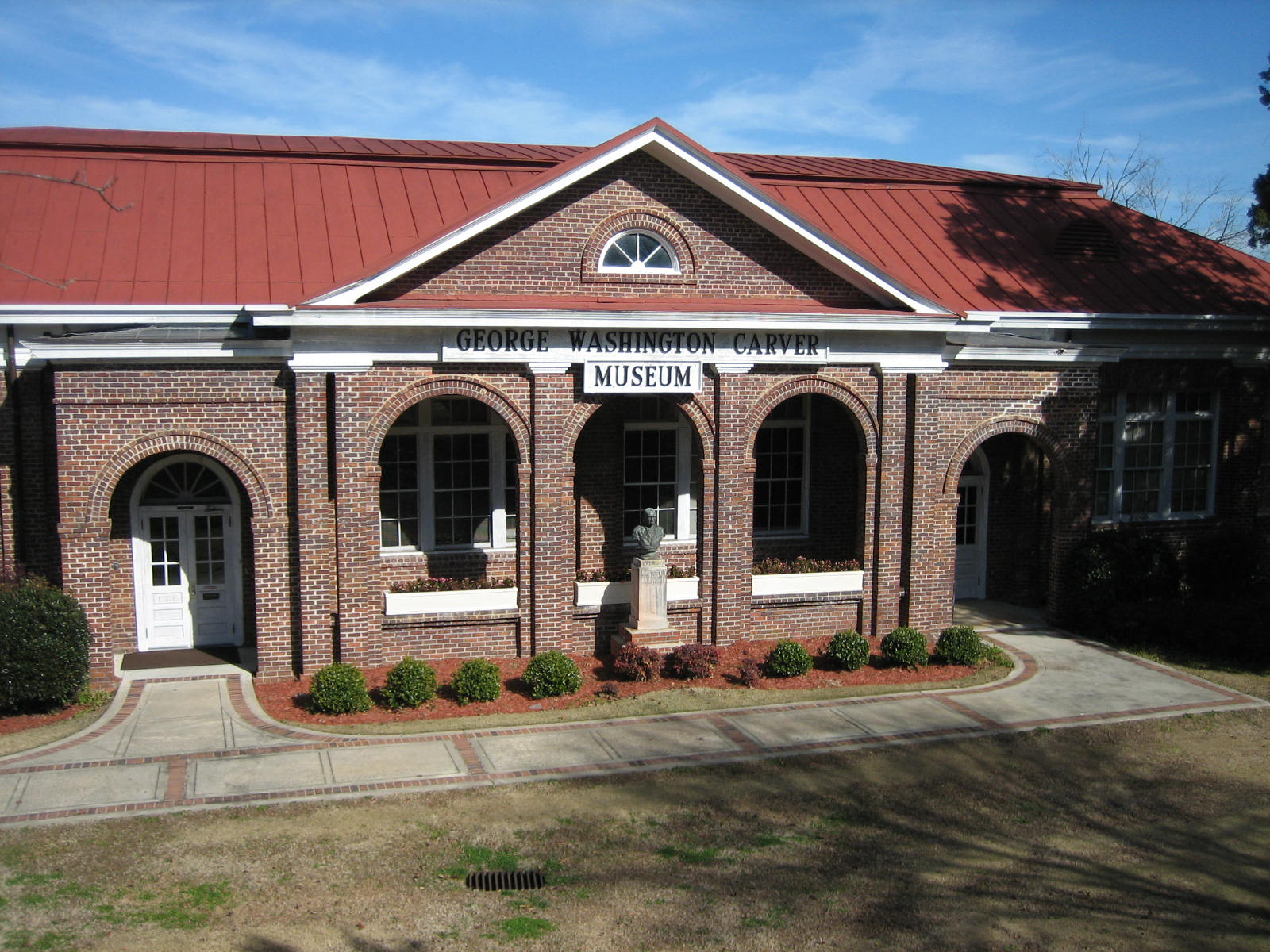
Front of the George Washington Carver Museum in Tuskegee, Alabama, United States.

The George Washington Carver Museum is a history museum located in Tuskegee, Alabama, United States. It is a part of the Tuskegee Institute National Historic Site. The museum, located on the campus of Tuskegee University, is managed by the US National Park Service, with self-guided tours.

The George Washington Carver Museum has several exhibits, including crop rotation theories that helped the Southern United States's economy boom, and the history of George Washington Carver himself.

== Overview ==
The museum consists of many exhibits, interpretive programs, a book sales area and two introductory films on George Washington Carver and Booker T. Washington, and are available at the museum.

The museum was developed with substantial support from admirer and industrialist Henry Ford. Carver wanted the fruits of his life's work on display at the museum. He hoped that the exhibits would inspire children to live better lives.

The original museum was housed in a remodeled building and was filled with Carver's geological and mycological (fungus) specimens made over a lifetime. Carver's artwork and crafts were also displayed in the museum. Mounted regional bird specimens and giant vegetables preserved in jars that he used as "show and tell" at farm and county fair demonstrations became part of the museum.

Carver first served as Director of the Agricultural Department where he developed agricultural extension services for black farmers and homemakers. Milbank Hall was the site of his agricultural experiments. His last laboratory was housed in the Carver Museum.

Tuskegee Institute (now Tuskegee University) donated the home of Booker T. Washington and the Carver Museum to the National Park Service in 1977, and much of the Carver collection in 1979.

== History ==
Dr George Washington Carver worked at Tuskegee Institute for 47 years. He was the son of a slave woman, whose owner was named Moses Carver. Carver remained on Moses' estate until he was 12 years of age. He would paint pictures of flowers, plants, and landscapes. He never ceased efforts to improve the living conditions and surroundings of rural and farm people - particularly those who lived in the South - and to extract from nature through scientific research those elements and resources which could be made useful for the benefit of mankind. Many honors came to him during his lifetime, but none gave him more genuine pleasure and satisfaction than his own museum. It was always his wish that everything he did would be available to the public for the general good of all.

The George Washington Carver Museum was authorized by the trustees of Tuskegee Institute in 1938 at the request of President Frederick D. Patterson. The museum, formerly the school laundry, housed Dr Carver's extensive collections of native plants, minerals, birds and vegetables; his products from the peanut, sweet potato and clays; and his numerous paintings, drawings, and textile art. The museum was formally dedicated by Mr and Mrs Henry Ford in 1941. In January 1943, Dr Carver died and was buried in the Campus Cemetery.

In 1947, a fire caused great loss in the museum. Fortunately, many of Dr Carver's products were not seriously damaged. However, only a few of his paintings were saved, those mostly damaged by smoke and water. When the building was renovated in 1951, it was enlarged to include a basement exhibit area. With a total area of 13,000 square feet (1,200 m^{2}), it became a general repository for historic and modern treasures donated to Tuskegee Institute or removed from campus buildings. The museum also held an extensive collection of African crafts and artifacts. Over 300 bound volumes and rare pamphlets of south, central and west coast Africa, and more than 1000 photographs of life in Ghana and Nigeria were included.

Between 1951 and 1962, Bess Bolden Walcott served as the curator of the museum. Her work as a curator of the museum led to its becoming a National Park Service site. The Tuskegee Institute National Historic Site was authorized in 1974 and established on November 13, 1977. The George Washington Carver Museum, along with the Booker T. Washington home "The Oaks," was then deeded to the people of the United States.

Both the museum and The Oaks (the home of Booker T. Washington) were closed to the public in February 1980 to undergo restoration and refurbishing. Restoration was the focus for the museum's exterior. The building's interior was gutted and rebuilt to house exhibits, artifact storage space, staff offices, an auditorium where audiovisual programs are conducted, and an elevator for disabled persons.

== Exhibits ==
The main exhibit area of the museum is divided into two sections. One section focuses on the comprehensive career of Dr Carver. Within this area is some of his laboratory equipment, including salvaged parts of discarded equipment with which he set up his first laboratory. Dr Carver had begun his research with only one true piece of scientific equipment: a microscope. Also included are samples of peanut and sweet potato products. The exhibits of his paintings, embroidery and needlework interpret the artistic talents of Dr Carver. On display are plaques, medals and artistic work created in tribute to Dr Carver.

The second section of the museum leads the visitor through the growth and development of Tuskegee Institute, founded in 1881, to the present day Tuskegee University. Through photographs and artifacts, the exhibits outline the school's accomplishments through extension work and the compilation of statistics on Black life are interpreted.

Returning visitors from the 1940s through the 1970s will note a smaller number of artifacts on display. It has not been necessary to exhibit several hundred extra items in order to provide a comprehensive interpretive experience. Items not on display are stored in a controlled environment. Ownership of a large selection of African artifacts formerly displayed in the museum was retained by Tuskegee University.

== See also ==
- List of museums focused on African Americans
