= Bradford Research Farm =

American research farm

Coordinates: 38.895°N 92.206°W

The Bradford Research Farm, a 591-acre tract, is one of the flagship research farms and agricultural experiment stations located in the U.S. state of Missouri. Affiliated with the University of Missouri (UM), a land-grant university, the Bradford Farm is located 11 miles east of the MU campus in the university city of Columbia.

As a research station, the Bradford Farm specializes in drought research, crop productivity research, and plant breeding. The Bradford Farm also hosts agricultural extension events, including FFA/4H gatherings, and community events.
