= Diamond, Missouri =

- City
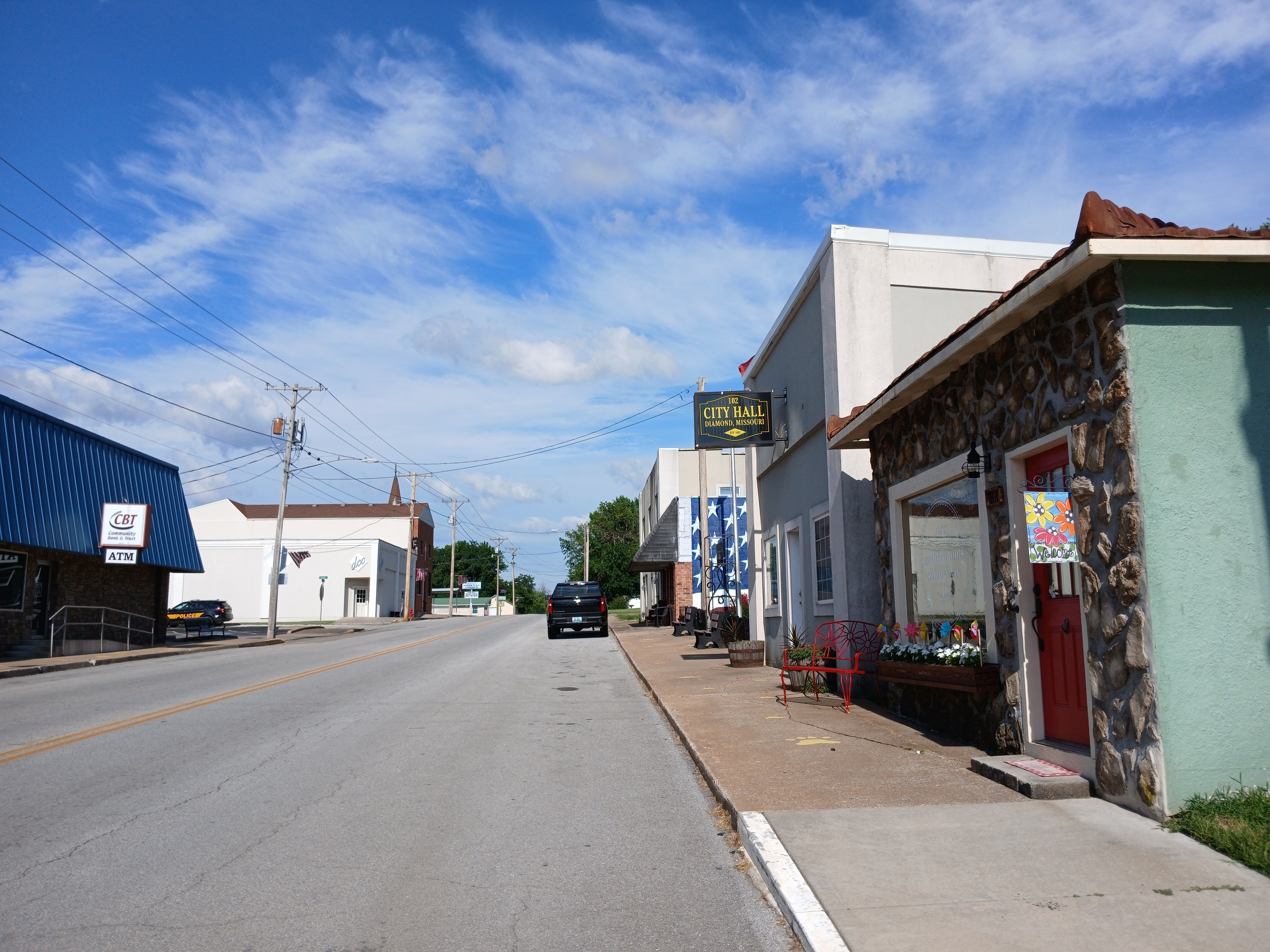
- Downtown Diamond in July 2024

- Location of Diamond, Missouri
- Coordinates: 36°59′49″N 94°18′55″W
- Country: United States
- State: Missouri
- County: Newton

Area
  - Total: 0.75 sq mi (1.94 km^{2})
  - Land: 0.75 sq mi (1.93 km^{2})
  - Water: 0 sq mi (0.00 km^{2})
- Elevation: 1,161 ft (354 m)

Population (2020)
  - Total: 831
  - Density: 1,113.2/sq mi (429.81/km^{2})
- Time zone: UTC-6 (Central (CST))
  - Summer (DST): UTC-5 (CDT)
- ZIP code: 64840
- Area code: 417
- FIPS code: 29-19432
- GNIS feature ID: 2396686
- Website: diamondmo.net

Diamond is a city in north central Newton County, Missouri, United States, located southeast of Joplin. The population was 831 at the 2020 census. It is part of the Joplin, Missouri, Metropolitan Statistical Area. Diamond is primarily renowned as the birthplace of George Washington Carver.

== History ==
The Diamond area's origins lie in a rolling prairie grassland; large remnants of the prairie survive or are being re-seeded as the Diamond Grove Prairie Conservation Area. The origins of the town started with the building of a log house owned by Dr. and Mrs. Leathers. Initially known as Center, a blacksmith's shop opened for business in 1878.

The town changed its name to Diamond when, in 1883, a post office came into operation. The area was named for a diamond-shaped tract of land near the original town site. Mining was historically the primary industry in Diamond.

== Geography ==
Diamond is located on Diamond Grove Prairie along Alt. Route 71 13 miles south of Carthage and about nine miles north-northeast of Neosho. The George Washington Carver National Monument is two miles to the west, south of Missouri Route V.

According to the United States Census Bureau, the city has a total area of 0.75 square miles (1.94 km^{2}), all land.

=== Climate ===
Climate data for Diamond, Missouri (1991–2020 normals, extremes 1993–present)
Month	Jan	Feb	Mar	Apr	May	Jun	Jul	Aug	Sep	Oct	Nov	Dec	Year
Record high °F (°C)	76 (24)	86 (30)	88 (31)	92 (33)	92 (33)	103 (39)	108 (42)	110 (43)	104 (40)	94 (34)	86 (30)	81 (27)	110 (43)
Mean maximum °F (°C)	71.0 (21.7)	72.0 (22.2)	80.1 (26.7)	85.1 (29.5)	87.5 (30.8)	93.3 (34.1)	97.8 (36.6)	99.3 (37.4)	94.1 (34.5)	86.2 (30.1)	77.5 (25.3)	69.6 (20.9)	99.9 (37.7)
Mean daily maximum °F (°C)	46.0 (7.8)	50.5 (10.3)	59.5 (15.3)	68.8 (20.4)	76.3 (24.6)	85.1 (29.5)	89.9 (32.2)	90.0 (32.2)	82.5 (28.1)	71.6 (22.0)	59.1 (15.1)	49.0 (9.4)	69.0 (20.6)
Daily mean °F (°C)	34.3 (1.3)	38.4 (3.6)	47.1 (8.4)	56.2 (13.4)	64.9 (18.3)	74.0 (23.3)	78.4 (25.8)	77.4 (25.2)	69.9 (21.1)	58.2 (14.6)	46.9 (8.3)	37.6 (3.1)	56.9 (13.8)
Mean daily minimum °F (°C)	22.5 (−5.3)	26.3 (−3.2)	34.7 (1.5)	43.6 (6.4)	53.5 (11.9)	62.9 (17.2)	66.9 (19.4)	64.9 (18.3)	57.2 (14.0)	44.8 (7.1)	34.7 (1.5)	26.2 (−3.2)	44.8 (7.1)
Mean minimum °F (°C)	5.4 (−14.8)	8.3 (−13.2)	17.1 (−8.3)	26.1 (−3.3)	38.2 (3.4)	50.7 (10.4)	56.5 (13.6)	52.5 (11.4)	42.7 (5.9)	28.5 (−1.9)	17.2 (−8.2)	12.0 (−11.1)	1.3 (−17.1)
Record low °F (°C)	−16 (−27)	−16 (−27)	3 (−16)	16 (−9)	31 (−1)	44 (7)	47 (8)	47 (8)	31 (−1)	16 (−9)	6 (−14)	−4 (−20)	−16 (−27)
Average precipitation inches (mm)	1.91 (49)	2.24 (57)	3.54 (90)	5.24 (133)	6.71 (170)	5.49 (139)	3.80 (97)	3.48 (88)	4.48 (114)	3.89 (99)	3.58 (91)	2.51 (64)	46.87 (1,190)
Average precipitation days (≥ 0.01 in)	3.8	5.0	7.3	8.5	9.4	8.4	7.1	6.3	6.9	6.4	6.6	4.8	80.5
Source: NOAA (mean maxima/minima 2006–2020)

== Demographics ==
Historical population
Census	Pop.	Note	%±
1950	405		—
1960	453		11.9%
1970	608		34.2%
1980	766		26.0%
1990	775		1.2%
2000	808		4.3%
2010	902		11.6%
2020	831		−7.9%
U.S. Decennial Census

=== 2010 census ===
As of the census of 2010, there were 902 people, 372 households, and 250 families living in the city. The population density was 1,202.7 inhabitants per square mile (464.4/km^{2}). There were 409 housing units at an average density of 545.3 per square mile (210.5/km^{2}). The racial makeup of the city was 94.0% White, 0.7% African American, 1.4% Native American, 0.1% Asian, 1.1% from other races, and 2.7% from two or more races. Hispanic or Latino of any race were 1.9% of the population.

There were 372 households, of which 36.0% had children under the age of 18 living with them, 47.8% were married couples living together, 12.4% had a female householder with no husband present, 7.0% had a male householder with no wife present, and 32.8% were non-families. 28.5% of all households were made up of individuals, and 12.3% had someone living alone who was 65 years of age or older. The average household size was 2.42 and the average family size was 2.95.

The median age in the city was 35 years. 26.7% of residents were under the age of 18; 9.9% were between the ages of 18 and 24; 23.4% were from 25 to 44; 24.7% were from 45 to 64; and 15.4% were 65 years of age or older. The gender makeup of the city was 49.8% male and 50.2% female.

=== 2000 census ===
As of the census of 2000, there were 808 people, 320 households, and 234 families living in the town. The population density was 1,215.2 inhabitants per square mile (469.2/km^{2}). There were 350 housing units at an average density of 528.0 per square mile (203.9/km^{2}). The racial makeup of the town was 96.42% White, 0.74% African American, 1.50% Native American, 0.12% Asian, 0.25% from other races, and 1.00% from two or more races. Hispanic or Latino of any race were 1.36% of the population.

There were 320 households, out of which 36.4% had children under the age of 18 living with them, 59.6% were married couples living together, 10.4% had a female householder with no husband present, and 26.6% were non-families. 25.4% of all households were made up of individuals, and 14.0% had someone living alone who was 65 years of age or older. The average household size was 2.54 and the average family size was 3.02.

In the town the population was spread out, with 27.8% under the age of 18, 12.4% from 18 to 24, 26.6% from 25 to 44, 19.6% from 45 to 64, and 13.8% who were 65 years of age or older. The median age was 33 years. For every 100 females, there were 120.0 males. For every 100 females age 18 and over, there were 87.5 males.

The median income for a household in the town was $29,000, and the median income for a family was $34,167. Males had a median income of $25,719 versus $20,000 for females. The per capita income for the town was $13,581. About 9.8% of families and 11.6% of the population were below the poverty line, including 19.4% of those under age 18 and 5.8% of those age 65 or over.

== Notable person ==
- George Washington Carver – scientist, botanist, educator, and inventor, was born near Diamond c. 1864. Carver's boyhood home, the George Washington Carver National Monument, is open to the public.
