= George Washington Carver National Monument =

National monument in Missouri, US

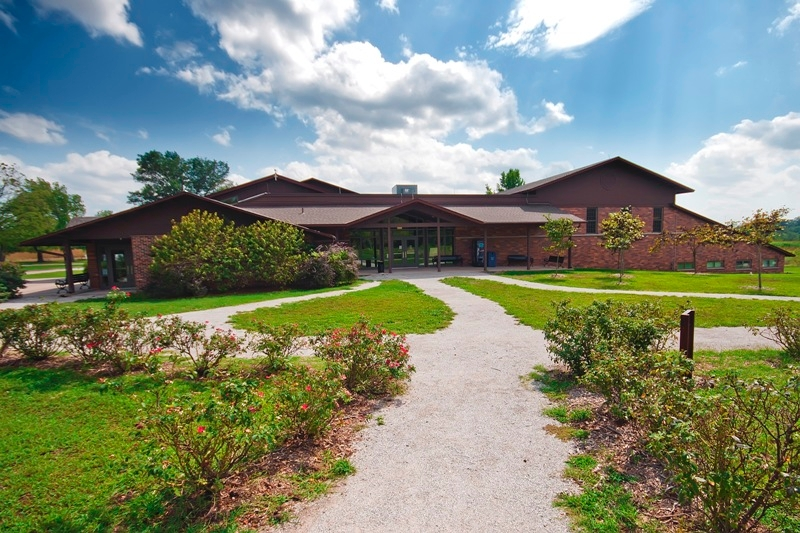
- Visitor center

- Location within Missouri Location within the United States
- Interactive map of George Washington Carver National Monument
- Location: Newton County, Missouri, United States
- Nearest city: Diamond, Missouri
- Coordinates: 36°59′11″N 94°21′15″W
- Area: 240 acres (97 ha)
- Authorized: July 14, 1943
- Visitors: 31,062 (in 2025)
- Governing body: National Park Service
- Website: George Washington Carver National Monument
- George Washington Carver National Monument
- U.S. National Register of Historic Places
- U.S. Historic district
- Nearest city: Diamond, Missouri
- Area: 240 acres (97 ha)
- NRHP reference No.: 66000114
- Added to NRHP: October 15, 1966

George Washington Carver National Monument is a unit of the National Park Service in Newton County, Missouri, United States. The site is dedicated to George Washington Carver and includes his preserved childhood home.

The national monument was founded on July 14, 1943, by Franklin Delano Roosevelt, who dedicated $30,000 to the monument. It was the first national monument dedicated to an African American and first to a non-president.

The site preserves the boyhood home of George Washington Carver, as well as the 1881 Moses Carver house and the Carver cemetery. His boyhood home consists of rolling hills, woodlands, and prairies. The 240-acre (97 ha) park has a 3/4-mile (1.2 km) nature trail, film, museum, and an interactive exhibit area for students.

The park is two miles west of Diamond along Missouri Route V and approximately ten miles southeast of Joplin.

It was listed on the National Register of Historic Places in 1966.

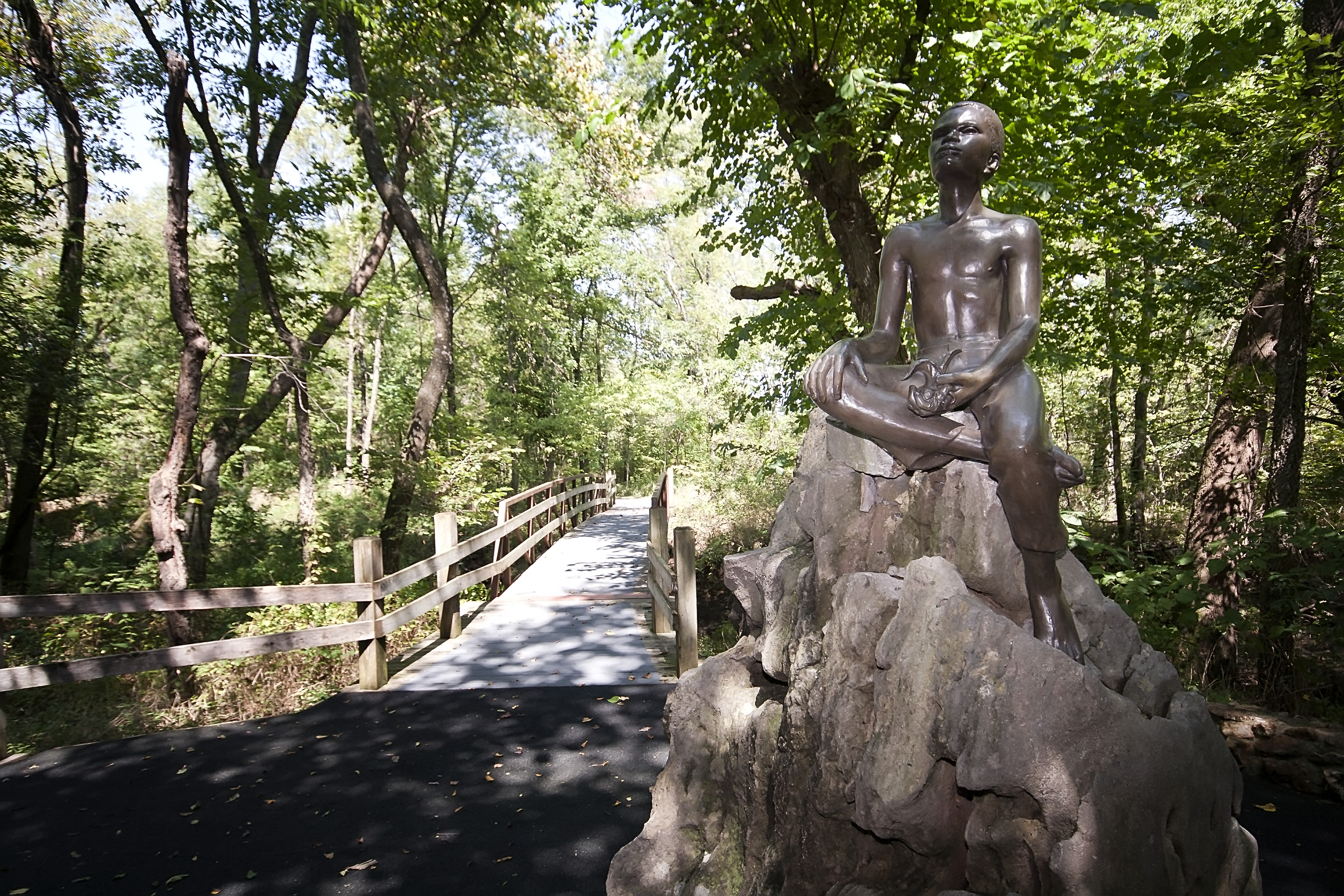
A statue of Carver as a child stands along a one-mile trail loop.

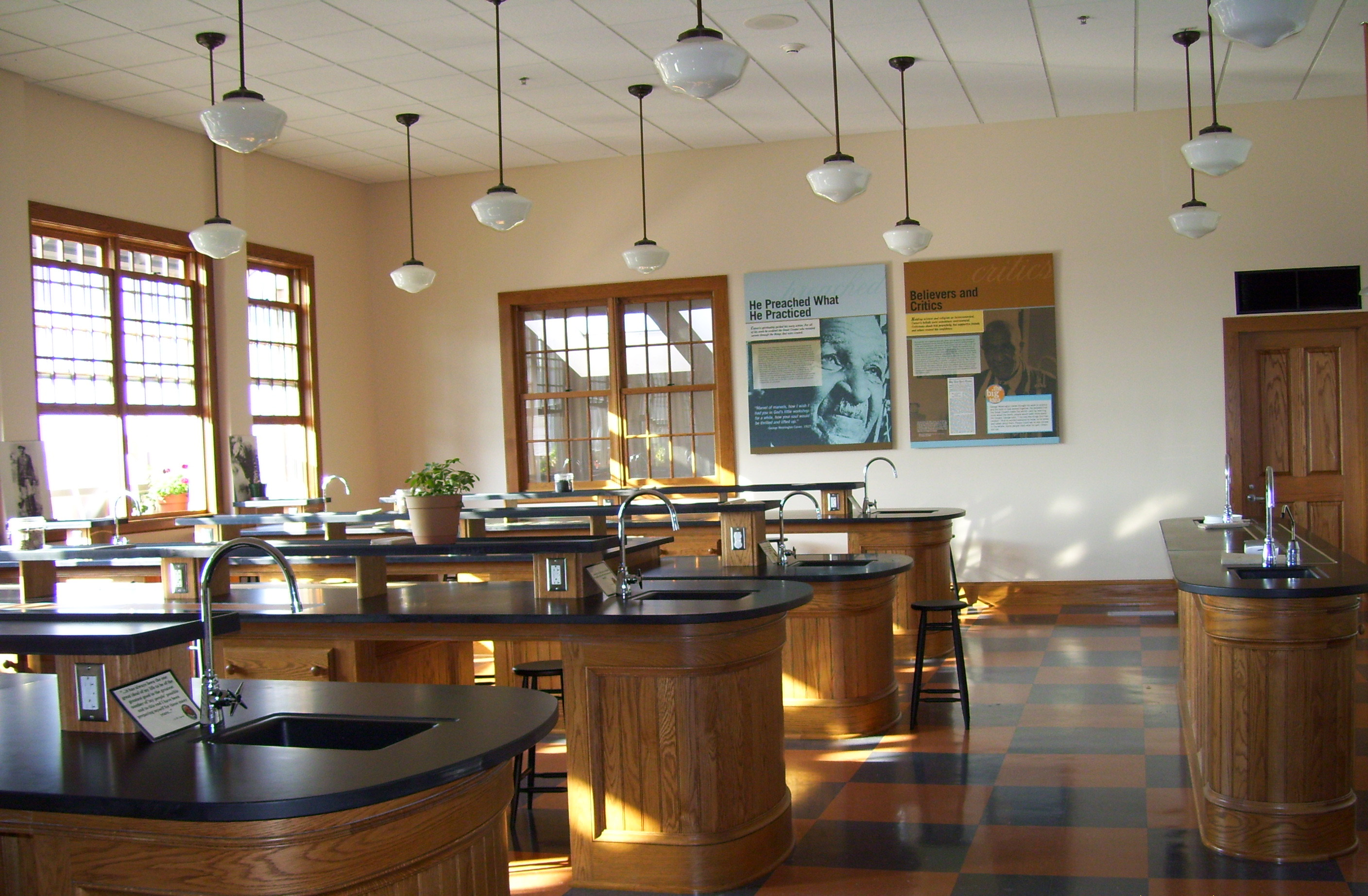
The visitor center includes a classroom modeled after one of the Carver's labs at the Tuskegee Institute.

== See also ==
- List of national monuments of the United States
