= National Register of Historic Places listings in Newton County, Missouri =

Location of Newton County in Missouri

This is a list of the National Register of Historic Places listings in Newton County, Missouri.

This is intended to be a complete list of the properties and districts on the National Register of Historic Places in Newton County, Missouri, United States. Latitude and longitude coordinates are provided for many National Register properties and districts; these locations may be seen together in a map.

There are 12 properties and districts listed on the National Register in the county.

This National Park Service list is complete through NPS recent listings posted December 12, 2025.

== Current listings ==
	Name on the Register	Image	Date listed	Location	City or town	Description
1	First Battle of Newtonia Historic District		December 23, 2004 (#04000697)	Junction of Routes 86 and O 36°53′05″N 94°11′02″W	Newtonia	
2	Bonnie & Clyde Garage Apartment	Bonnie & Clyde Garage Apartment	May 15, 2009 (#09000302)	3 miles (4.8 km) south of Monument; 37°03′06″N 94°31′00″W	Joplin	
3	George Washington Carver National Monument	George Washington Carver National Monument	October 15, 1966 (#66000114)	3 miles (4.8 km) south of Monument; 36°59′07″N 94°21′18″W	Diamond vicinity	
4	Jolly Mill	Jolly Mill	October 13, 1983 (#83004021)	Southwest of Pierce City; 36°53′50″N 94°04′18″W	Pierce City vicinity	
5	Lentz-Carter Merchandise Store	Lentz-Carter Merchandise Store	August 19, 2008 (#08000799)	744 Ozark St. 36°45′38″N 94°11′32″W	Stella	
6	Neosho Colored School	Neosho Colored School	April 17, 2017 (#100000887)	639 Young St. 36°52′34″N 94°22′27″W	Neosho	
7	Neosho Commercial Historic District	Neosho Commercial Historic District	August 12, 1993 (#93000722)	Along sections of Main, Spring, Washington and Wood Sts.; also 114, 116, 118-120, 120, and 124-126 S. Wood St. 36°52′11″N 94°22′03″W	Neosho	Second set of boundaries represents a boundary increase of April 18, 2007
8	Neosho High School	Neosho High School	August 30, 2002 (#02000906)	W. McCord and N. Wood Sts. 36°52′17″N 94°22′08″W	Neosho	
9	Neosho Wholesale Grocery Company	Neosho Wholesale Grocery Company	April 16, 2013 (#13000171)	224 N. Washington St. 36°52′17″N 94°22′02″W	Neosho	
10	Mathew H. Ritchey House	Mathew H. Ritchey House	December 5, 1978 (#78003399)	Mill St. 36°52′39″N 94°10′58″W	Newtonia	
11	Second Baptist Church	Second Baptist Church	January 4, 1996 (#95001495)	430 W. Grant St. 36°52′31″N 94°22′29″W	Neosho	
12	Second Battle of Newtonia Site		December 23, 2004 (#04000698)	Roughly an area northwest, southwest and southeast of the junction of Routes 86 and O at Newtonia; 36°52′19″N 94°11′36″W	Newtonia	

== See also ==
- List of National Historic Landmarks in Missouri
- National Register of Historic Places listings in Missouri
