= Neosho =

Neosho is a Native American word generally accepted to be of Osage derivation. It is translated variously as "water that has been made muddy", "clear cold water" or "clear water", the last being the most accepted.

Neosho may refer to:

== Places in the United States ==
- Neosho, Missouri, a city in Newton County
- Neosho National Fish Hatchery, Newton County, Missouri
- Neosho, Wisconsin, a village
- Neosho County, Kansas
  - Neosho State Fishing Lake, Neosho County, Kansas
- Neosho Falls, Kansas, a city
- Neosho Rapids, Kansas, a city
- Neosho River, a tributary of the Arkansas River in Kansas and Oklahoma

== United States Navy ==
- USS Neosho, several ships
- Neosho class, a class of oiler
- Neosho-class monitor, a pair of ironclad American Civil War river monitors

== See also ==
- Neosho madtom, a small catfish
- Neosho mucket, a species of freshwater mussel
