= 2007 Neosho church shooting =

Mass shooting in Missouri, U.S.

Neosho church shooting
- Location: 36.870547°N 94.368057°W; First Congregational Church; Neosho, Missouri, U.S.
- Date: August 12, 2007
- Attack type: Mass shooting; mass murder; hostage-taking
- Weapons: 9x19mm Intratec TEC-9; .22 caliber revolver
- Deaths: 3
- Injuries: 4
- Perpetrator: Eiken Elam Saimon
- Convictions: First-degree murder (3x); First-degree assault (4x); Second-degree statutory rape Second-degree statutory sodomy

On August 12, 2007, a mass shooting took place at the First Congregational Church in Neosho, Missouri, United States. The shooter, 52-year-old Eiken Elam Saimon, a citizen of the Federated States of Micronesia, killed the church pastor and two deacons and wounded four others. After a brief hostage situation, he was arrested by police. He later agreed to a plea deal to accept three life sentences without parole and other penalties in exchange for avoiding the death penalty.

== Background ==
At the time of the attack, about 200 Micronesians lived in the city of Neosho (a city with a population of around 12,000 people), and services at the First Congregational Church were primarily conducted in the Pingelapese language. The mostly Micronesian congregation rented the church for their services. Prior to the shooting, Neosho had not had a homicide in more than a decade.

== Shooting and hostage situation ==
Saimon entered the First Congregational Church, armed with a .22 caliber revolver and a 9 mm TEC-9 semi-automatic pistol. Saimon demanded the children present at the church and a relative of his to leave before yelling "Liar, liar!" and opening fire on senior members of the church. Saimon killed the church pastor and two deacons and wounded four others.

After shooting the victims, Saimon held the approximately 50 remaining churchgoers hostage. After between five and ten minutes of negotiations, police convinced Saimon to surrender and he was taken into custody without further incident.

== Victims ==
The three slain victims were identified as Senior Pastor Rev. Kernel Rehobson, aged 43, Pastor Intenson Rehobson, aged 44, and Associate Pastor Kuhpes Ikosia, aged 53. Kernel Rehobson was the son of Saimon's cousin and Intenson Rehobson was Kernel's uncle. The four injured victims were Jim Handy, Melihna Tara, Dahnny Jack and Kendey Handy.

== Perpetrator ==
Eiken Elam Saimon is a citizen of the Federated States of Micronesia from the Pohnpei State. Saimon was charged with three counts of first-degree murder and four counts of first-degree assault in connection to the incident. In addition to the shooting charges, Saimon was charged with second-degree statutory rape and second-degree statutory sodomy for the sexual assault of his 14-year-old niece. The sexual assault victim said Saimon had raped her in retaliation for her stealing his car and wrecking it the night before.

In March 2009, Saimon plead guilty to the charges under a plea deal which allowed him to avoid the death penalty. Saimon received three life sentences without parole for the murders, four 30-year sentences for the assaults, and two seven-year sentences for the sex offenses.

== Reactions ==
Micronesian president Manny Mori sent a letter to the victim's families in which he expressed his condolences and said that the he and the people of Micronesia were "expressing [their] deepest sympathies and prayers to families of the victims and members of the community and those affected by the incident".

Missouri governor Matt Blunt held a press conference a day after the attack at the Newton County Sheriff's office to address the shooting. Blunt said that his "thoughts and prayers" were with the victims and residents of Neosho and he commended the response of responding law enforcement agencies. Neosho mayor Howard Birdsong thanked the community for their response to the shooting and said that he looked forward to a brighter future.

== See also ==
- Crime in Missouri
- Kirkwood City Council shooting, a mass shooting in Missouri which happened less than a year later
- 2006 Baton Rouge church shooting, a church shooting with similar circumstances
- 2008 Knoxville church shooting, a church shooting which happened less than a year later
