= Horner Institute =

Private school in Missouri (1902–1913)

- Type: Private
- Active: 1902–1913
- Officer in charge: J. Turner Horner
- Principal: J. Turner Horner
- Location: Rocky Comfort, Missouri, Fairview, Missouri, Stella, Missouri, Purdy, Missouri, Missouri, United States
- Campus: Rural

The Horner Institute was a coeducational private school that operated between 1902 and 1913 at different locations in McDonald, Newton and Barry counties in southwest Missouri. The school was founded by J.Turner Horner (1866-1942) and offered instruction from the eighth grade through high school.

== History ==
J. Turner Horner, with the aid of his wife, Martha, established his school in 1902 Rocky Comfort, Missouri, which had a population of between 300-500 residents at the time. It offered a wide range of classes, including English literature, Latin, Greek, German, geometry, algebra, physics, public speaking, pedagogy, United States history, English history, music, piano, organ, bookkeeping, modern agriculture and others. In 1908 the town of Fairview, Missouri, made an offer to Horner to house his school, which included moving the building that housed it and providing him with a $2,000 bonus, which he accepted, then in 1911 it merged with the Stella Academy and moved to Stella, Missouri. It moved a final time in 1912 to Purdy, Missouri, where it occupied a new two-story brick structure before closing in 1913. An effort was made in 1913 for the institute to move to Carthage, Missouri and be housed in the former Carthage Collegiate Institute, which had been founded in 1886 and closed in 1908, building by A. L. McCauley of Joplin, Missouri and J. A. Turner or Purdy. It advertised that students graduating from the school were then granted admission to the University of Missouri and certain other state colleges without taking normal entrance exams. Tuition cost were $18–$30 for a nine-month term, $18 for eighth grade instruction and $30 for high school, with room and board was available for $2.50-$3.00 per week with private families.

== Institute founder ==
J. Turner Horner was born July 26, 1866, in Cassville, Missouri, and was former preacher who also served as a county judge in McDonald County, including a short stint as presiding judge in 1894, prior to founding the school. Horner had been educated at Pauline College and the University of Missouri. But despite his earlier education and founding of the Horner Institute, he did not actually attain a college degree until he finished coursework at Drury College in July 1913, resulting in a bachelor's degree, at the same time his daughter Eva May Horner received her degree from the same school. After receiving his degree, Horner's institute closed and he moved to Tulsa, Oklahoma, in 1913 where he continued to work as an educator, including serving as principal of the Tulsa Night School. Turner later moved to Santa Fe, New Mexico where he served as principal of a high school in the city. In 1934 he established a business school in Joplin, Missouri. He died on September 15, 1942, in Woodard, Oklahoma, and was buried at the Neosho IOOF Cemetery in Neosho, Missouri, beside his first wife, Martha.

In addition to his and his wife's leadership of the Horner Institute, their daughter, Eva Horner, also served as an instructor at the school. His son served as principal of the Institute in 1913 while the elder Horner was finishing his coursework for a bachelor's degree from Drury College.
