= Rocky Comfort, Missouri =

- Census-designated place
- Location within Missouri Location within the United States
- Country: United States
- State: Missouri
- County: McDonald

Area
  - Total: 0.55 sq mi (1.43 km^{2})
  - Land: 0.55 sq mi (1.43 km^{2})
  - Water: 0 sq mi (0.00 km^{2})
- Elevation: 1,339 ft (408 m)

Population (2020)
  - Total: 176
  - Density: 318/sq mi (122.7/km^{2})
- ZIP Code: 64861
- FIPS code: 29-62822
- GNIS feature ID: 2806413

Rocky Comfort is an unincorporated community and census-designated place in McDonald County, Missouri, United States, on Missouri Route 76. As of the 2020 census, it had a population of 176.

A post office called Rocky Comfort has been in operation since 1876. Some say the community was named for the rocky terrain in an idyllic setting, while others believe the name is a transfer from Rocky Comfort, Arkansas. The community is mentioned in Dennis Murphy's poem of 1941, The Doomed Race, and is both title and setting for Wayne Holmes' 2009 memoir, Rocky Comfort. From 1902 to 1908, when it moved to nearby Fairview, the Horner Institute, a private school offering courses from the eighth grade through high school, was located in Rocky Comfort.

== Geography ==
Rocky Comfort is in the northeast corner of McDonald County and is bordered to the north by Newton County. Route 76 passes through the southeast part of the community. The town of Wheaton is 3 miles (5 km) to the northeast, and Anderson is 25 miles (40 km) to the southwest.

According to the U.S. Census Bureau, the Rocky Comfort CDP has an area of 0.55 square miles (1.42 km^{2}), all land. The community is drained by South Indian Creek, which flows northwest to form Indian Creek, part of the Elk River watershed, at Boulder City.

== Demographics ==
Historical population
Census	Pop.	Note	%±
2020	176		—
U.S. Decennial Census

Rocky Comfort first appeared as a census designated place in the 2020 U.S. census.

== Education ==
The northern and western portion is in the McDonald County R-I School District, while the southern and eastern portion is in the Wheaton R-III School District.

== Notable person ==
- Travis Phelps, former Major League Baseball pitcher who was born in Rocky Comfort
