= Jacqueline Scott =

American actress (1931–2020)

- Scott in General Electric True, 1963
- Born: June 25, 1931; Sikeston, Missouri, U.S.
- Died: July 23, 2020 (aged 89); Los Angeles, California, U.S.
- Occupation: Actress
- Years active: 1956–2009
- Spouse: Gene Lesser (m. 1958; died 2020)
- Children: 2

Jacqueline Sue Scott (June 25, 1931 – July 23, 2020) was an American actress who appeared on Broadway and in several films, but mostly guest-starred in more than 100 television programs.

== Biography ==
The daughter of John and Maxine Scott, she settled down in Neosho, Missouri, where she graduated from Neosho High School in 1949. She then went to New York City and attended Hunter College.

Her initial experience on stage came when she traveled with a tent show in Missouri. On Broadway, she portrayed Susan Dennison in The Wooden Dish (1955) and Rachel Brown in Inherit the Wind (1955–57).

Scott made her motion-picture debut in William Castle's Macabre (1958). During production of Macabre in 1957, she met Gene Lesser, and they were married a few months later.

She started her career in television by playing opposite such stars as Helen Hayes on live television. Between 1958 and 1960, Scott made three guest appearances on Perry Mason: Amelia Armitage in "The Case of the Daring Decoy" (1958), Sally Wilson in "The Case of the Glittering Goldfish" (1959), and Kathi Beecher in "The Case of the Violent Village" (1960). In The Outer Limits, she played the wife of the protagonist in the series' first episode, "The Galaxy Being" (1963). In the television series The Fugitive, Scott played the sister of Dr. Richard Kimble (David Janssen) in five episodes telecast between 1964 and 1967, including the two-part finale that at the time became the highest-rated program in television history.

Among her film roles, Scott played James Stewart's character's wife in the theatrical film Firecreek (1968), and the ill-fated outlaw wife of Walter Matthau in Charley Varrick (1973).

== Death ==
Scott died on July 23, 2020, at her home in Los Angeles from lung cancer. Her husband of 62 years, actor Gene Lesser, had died on June 23 of the same year.
