= Fairview, Missouri =

- City
- Location of Fairview, Missouri
- Coordinates: 36°49′02″N 94°05′12″W
- Country: United States
- State: Missouri
- County: Newton

Area
  - Total: 0.47 sq mi (1.22 km^{2})
  - Land: 0.47 sq mi (1.22 km^{2})
  - Water: 0 sq mi (0.00 km^{2})
- Elevation: 1,296 ft (395 m)

Population (2020)
  - Total: 419
  - Density: 888.6/sq mi (343.09/km^{2})
- Time zone: UTC-6 (Central (CST))
  - Summer (DST): UTC-5 (CDT)
- ZIP code: 64842
- Area code: 417
- FIPS code: 29-23518
- GNIS feature ID: 2396932
- Website: cityoffairview.org

Fairview is a city in southeastern Newton County, Missouri, United States. The population was 383 at the 2010 census. It is part of the Joplin, Missouri Metropolitan Statistical Area.

== History ==
A post office called Fairview has been in operation since 1907. The community was so named on account of the fair setting of the original town site.

== Geography ==
Fairview is located along Missouri Route 86 in southeastern Newton County. It is approximately 18 miles east-southeast of Neosho and one mile west of the Barry-Newton county line. Stella is 6.5 miles to the southwest near the southern border of the county.

According to the United States Census Bureau, the city has a total area of 0.47 square miles (1.22 km^{2}), all land.

== Demographics ==
Historical population
Census	Pop.	Note	%±
1880	23		—
1890	89		287.0%
1900	137		53.9%
1910	270		97.1%
1920	378		40.0%
1930	315		−16.7%
1940	304		−3.5%
1950	259		−14.8%
1960	249		−3.9%
1970	263		5.6%
1980	282		7.2%
1990	298		5.7%
2000	395		32.6%
2010	383		−3.0%
2020	419		9.4%
U.S. Decennial Census

=== 2010 census ===
As of the census of 2010, there were 383 people, 146 households, and 102 families living in the city. The population density was 814.9 inhabitants per square mile (314.6/km^{2}). There were 173 housing units at an average density of 368.1 per square mile (142.1/km^{2}). The racial makeup of the city was 91.6% White, 0.8% African American, 2.9% Native American, 0.3% Asian, 2.1% from other races, and 2.3% from two or more races. Hispanic or Latino of any race were 5.0% of the population.

There were 146 households, of which 36.3% had children under the age of 18 living with them, 54.1% were married couples living together, 13.7% had a female householder with no husband present, 2.1% had a male householder with no wife present, and 30.1% were non-families. 25.3% of all households were made up of individuals, and 13.7% had someone living alone who was 65 years of age or older. The average household size was 2.62 and the average family size was 3.17.

The median age in the city was 37.1 years. 27.4% of residents were under the age of 18; 9.1% were between the ages of 18 and 24; 23.6% were from 25 to 44; 21.9% were from 45 to 64; and 17.8% were 65 years of age or older. The gender makeup of the city was 49.1% male and 50.9% female.

=== 2000 census ===
As of the census of 2000, there were 395 people, 146 households, and 109 families living in the town. The population density was 824.5 inhabitants per square mile (318.3/km^{2}). There were 164 housing units at an average density of 342.3 per square mile (132.2/km^{2}). The racial makeup of the town was 95.19% White, 0.25% African American, 1.27% Native American, 0.51% Asian, 0.76% Pacific Islander, and 2.03% from two or more races. Hispanic or Latino of any race were 0.76% of the population.

There were 146 households, out of which 39.0% had children under the age of 18 living with them, 54.1% were married couples living together, 14.4% had a female householder with no husband present, and 25.3% were non-families. 22.6% of all households were made up of individuals, and 11.0% had someone living alone who was 65 years of age or older. The average household size was 2.71 and the average family size was 3.09.

In the town the population was spread out, with 31.1% under the age of 18, 9.4% from 18 to 24, 25.8% from 25 to 44, 19.0% from 45 to 64, and 14.7% who were 65 years of age or older. The median age was 34 years. For every 100 females, there were 100.5 males. For every 100 females age 18 and over, there were 95.7 males.

The median income for a household in the town was $27,250, and the median income for a family was $29,688. Males had a median income of $26,250 versus $17,031 for females. The per capita income for the town was $12,198. About 13.2% of families and 20.4% of the population were below the poverty line, including 31.6% of those under age 18 and 1.8% of those age 65 or over.

== Education ==
The Horner Institute, a private school offering courses of study from the eighth grade through high school, was located in Fairview from 1908 until merging with the Stella Academy and moving to Stella in 1912.

== Notable people ==
- Dabbs Greer, actor, best known for his role as Reverend Alden on Little House on the Prairie
