= McGinty (disambiguation) =

McGinty is a surname of Irish origin.

McGinty may also refer to:

- McGinty (horse), a New Zealand racehorse
- McGinty's Department Store in Neosho, Missouri; defunct
- McGinty Mountain, in San Diego County, California
- USS McGinty (DE-365), a destroyer escort of the US Navy

== Popular culture ==
- Mrs McGinty's Dead, a novel by Agatha Christie
- "Down Went McGinty", 1889 song by Joseph Flynn
- "Paddy McGinty's Goat", 1917 song by Bert Lee and R. P. Weston with the Two Bobs
- The Great McGinty, 1940 film directed by Preston Sturges, based on the 1889 song
- Arthur Ransome's children's novel characters Mrs McGinty in Coot Club and Scottish landholder The McGinty in Great Northern?
