= 2008 Knoxville church shooting =

Mass shooting in Tennessee, U.S.

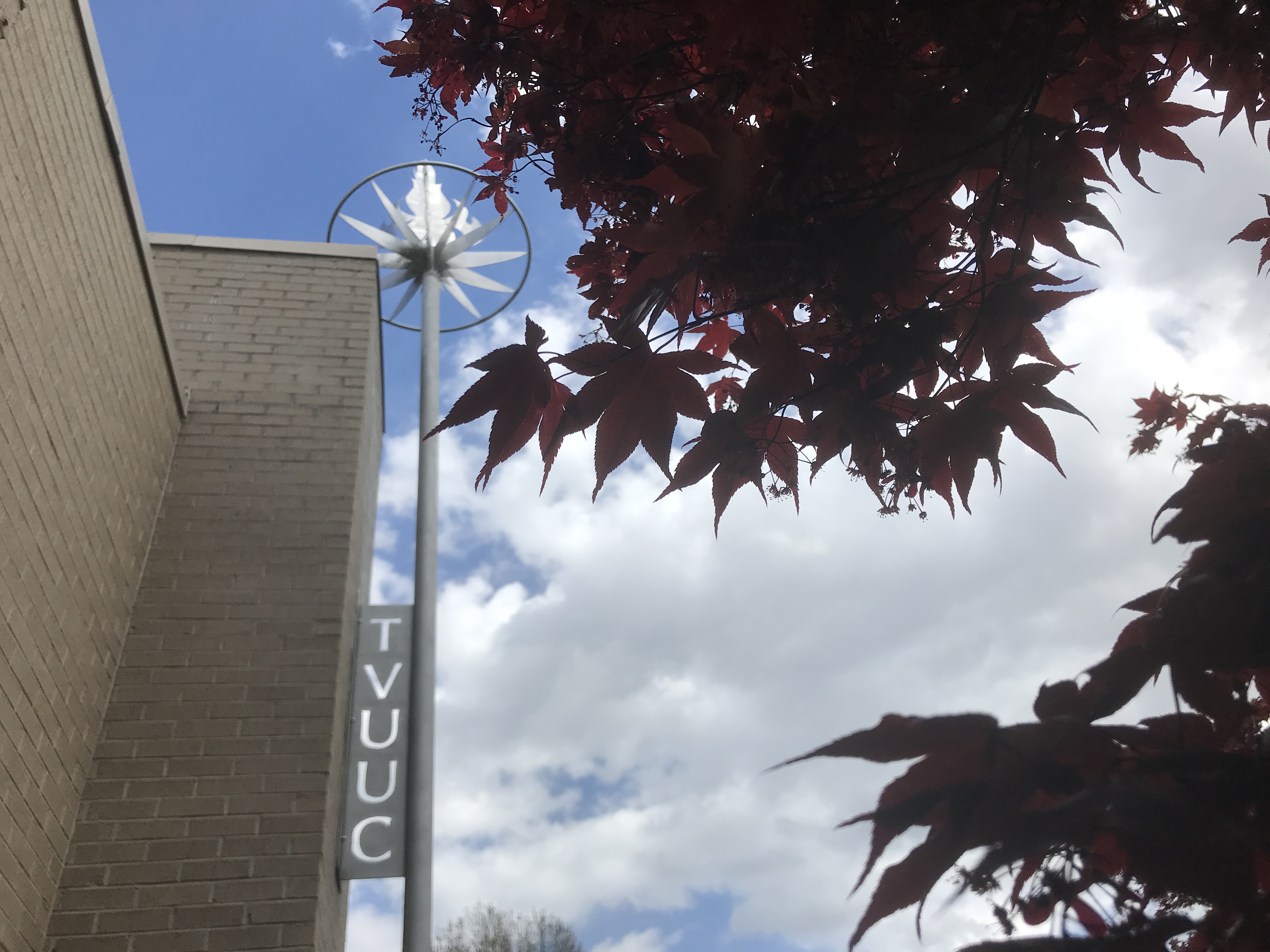
- Metal sculpture flaming chalice with the church's 5-letter abbreviation TVUUC
- Location: 35.951825°N 83.952300°W; Knoxville, Tennessee, United States
- Date: July 27, 2008; 18 years ago (EDT)
- Attack type: Mass shooting
- Weapon: Remington Model 48 12-gauge shotgun
- Deaths: 2
- Injuries: 7 (6 by gunfire)
- Perpetrator: Jim David Adkisson
- Defenders: John Bohstedt; Robert Birdwell; Arthur Bolds; Terry Uselton; Jamie Parkey
- Motive: Hatred of liberals and Democrats

On July 27, 2008, a mass shooting took place at the Tennessee Valley Unitarian Universalist Church in Knoxville, Tennessee, United States. The shooter was identified as an unemployed truck driver named Jim David Adkisson. Adkisson opened fire on members of the congregation during a church youth performance, killing two people and wounding six others before he was restrained by church members; according to police, he had planned to keep shooting until the police arrived and killed him. A letter, or "manifesto", found in his vehicle after the shooting attributed his motivation for the rampage as a hatred of liberals, Democrats, African Americans, and homosexuals. In the letter, he also described what he believed to be the cult-like atmosphere of the church. Adkisson pled guilty to two counts of murder and received a sentence of life in prison without parole.

== Shooting ==
The Unitarian Universalist church hosted a youth performance of Annie Jr. Some 200 people were watching the performance by 25 children when Adkisson entered the church and opened fire on the audience. 60-year-old Greg McKendry, a longtime church member and usher who deliberately stood in front of the gunman to protect others, was killed at the scene. A 61-year-old woman, Linda Kraeger, died from wounds suffered during the attack later that night. Kraeger was a member of the Westside Unitarian Universalist Church in Farragut. Seven people were non-fatally injured, including six injuries from gunfire and one accidental escape injury.

The shooter was stopped when church members John Bohstedt, Robert Birdwell, Arthur Bolds and Terry Uselton, along with visitor Jamie Parkey, restrained him.

== Perpetrator ==
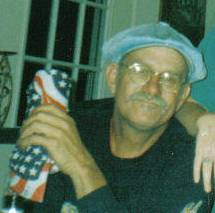
Jim David Adkisson In 2002

Jim David Adkisson (born June 25, 1950) was a former private in the United States Army from 1974 to 1977. After his arrest, he said that he was motivated by hatred of Democrats, liberals, African Americans and homosexuals. According to an affidavit by one of the officers who interviewed Adkisson on July 27, 2008:

During the interview Adkisson stated that he had targeted the church because of its liberal teachings and his belief that all liberals should be killed because they were ruining the country, and that he felt that the Democrats had tied his country's hands in the war on terror and they had ruined every institution in America with the aid of major media outlets. Adkisson made statements that because he could not get to the leaders of the liberal movement that he would then target those who had voted them into office. Adkisson stated that he had held these beliefs for about the last ten years.

Additionally, one of Adkisson's former wives had been a member (in the 1990s) of the church where the attack occurred.

Adkisson's manifesto also cited the inability to find a job. His manifesto stated that he intended to keep shooting until police arrived and expected to be killed by police. Adkisson had a waist satchel with more ammunition, totaling 76 shells of #4 shot.

In his manifesto, Adkisson also included the Democratic members of the House and Senate, and the 100 People Who Are Screwing Up America of Bernard Goldberg in his list of wished-for targets. David Neiwert has written that anger over Barack Obama's candidacy was also a factor as Adkisson had written "I'm protesting the DNC running such a radical leftist candidate. Osama Hussein Obama, yo mama" comparing candidate Obama to the fictional chimp Curious George. He complained about inter-racial couples: "How is a white woman having a niger [sic] baby progress?"

== Response ==
Within hours of the shooting, TVUUC Staff contacted the Unitarian Universalist Trauma Response Ministry Team (UUTRM), which sent members to assist the congregation and its leaders in planning to meet the emotional and psychological reactions following the shooting. In addition, UUTRM also assisted leaders in planning the congregational response in the months ahead. Many Unitarian Universalist congregations held special vigils and services in response to the Knoxville shooting. The Tennessee Valley Unitarian Universalist Church scheduled a rededication ceremony on August 3, 2008, at which John A. Buehrens, a former president of the Unitarian Universalist Association (UUA) and former pastor of TVUUC spoke. The UUA president, William G. Sinkford, spoke at a vigil held at Second Presbyterian Church in Knoxville on July 28, 2008. A relief fund was created by the UUA and its Thomas Jefferson District to aid those affected by the shooting. On August 10, 2008, the Unitarian Universalist Association took out a full-page ad in The New York Times. The ad carried the message, "Our Doors and Our Hearts Will Remain Open". The Unitarian Universalist Association carried comprehensive coverage of the response of the UU faith community online.

The TVUUC Board voted to rename the 'fellowship hall' to honor Greg McKendry, citing his outgoing and friendly personality, and to rename the church library to honor Linda Kraeger, citing her work as an author and professor. An oil painting of Greg McKendry by East Tennessee art professor Dr. Carl Gombert was hung over the fireplace in the Greg McKendry Fellowship Hall.

== Legal proceedings ==
At his first court appearance, Adkisson waived his rights to the preliminary hearing and requested that the case go directly to the grand jury. Adkisson was represented by public defender Mark Stephens. Stephens indicated that this move was taken to get the case to the trial stage as quickly as possible, so resources would become available for a mental health assessment of Adkisson, indicating a possible insanity defense.

On August 21, 2008, Adkisson was arraigned on charges of murder and attempted murder and a trial date of March 16, 2009, was set. He remained in jail on a $1 million bond. It was reported that the FBI had opened a civil rights probe in regards to the case.

On February 4, 2009, lawyers representing Adkisson announced that he would plead guilty to two counts of murder, accepting a life sentence without possibility of parole.

On February 9, 2009, Adkisson pleaded guilty to killing two people and wounding six others. "Yes, ma'am, I am guilty as charged," he told Criminal Court Judge Mary Beth Leibowitz before she sentenced him to life in prison without parole. A mental health expert had determined that Adkisson was competent to make the plea, although public defender Mark Stephens was prepared to argue at the trial that his client was insane at the time the crime was committed. The judge gave Adkisson a chance to address members of the congregation before sentencing him. "No, ma'am," he snapped. "I have nothing to say."

John Bohstedt, one of the church members who tackled Adkisson, said he didn't believe that Adkisson was insane, but that he had been manipulated by anti-liberal rhetoric. "Unbalanced, yes. Bitter, yes. Evil, yes. Insane, not in our ordinary use of the word," Bohstedt said.

Assistant District Attorney Leslie Nassios said Adkisson gave a statement to police, which showed that he planned the attack on the church because he believed that Democrats and the church's liberal politics "were responsible for his woes." Evidence showed that Adkisson bought the shotgun a month before the attack, sawed off the barrel at his home and carried the weapon into the church in a guitar case he had purchased two days before the shooting. He had written a suicide note and intended to keep firing until police officers arrived and killed him.

As of December 2024, Adkisson is imprisoned at the Northwest Correctional Complex in Tiptonville.

== "Terrorism" terminology ==
Douglas Lovelace, director of the Strategic Studies Institute at the US Army War College, contrasted Adkisson with another 21st-century mass shooter, Elliot Rodger, who killed six people in the 2014 Isla Vista killings in California. According to Lovelace, Adkisson was "largely considered a terrorist" while Rodger was widely viewed as a mass murderer, a distinction that Lovelace questioned.

Lovelace noted that many elements of Adkisson's background are consistent with those of typical mass murderers, including a history of substance abuse and feelings of depression, anger and hopelessness stemming from unemployment and financial woes. Unlike other mass murderers, however, Adkisson gives some details about political motivations for the crime in his suicide note. He lambasts mainstream media as propaganda for the Democratic Party, he accuses Democrats of being allied with terrorists in the war on terror, and blames liberalism for ruining the United States. Concerning the targeted Unitarian Universalist church, he calls it "a den of un-American vipers" saying they are "sickos, weirdos and homos" who will "embrace every pervert". He labels his own actions variously as a "hate crime", "political protest" and a "symbolic killing" which he concludes: "I thought I'd do something good for the country and kill Democrats".

Lovelace has written that Adkisson seems to have ascribed political causes to some of his personal problems, like his ex-wife's attendance at a church which, in his view violated his political views. Grievance was mixed with political belief and what he called a "hate crime." Rodger, on the other hand, expressed rage towards interracial couples, minorities and girls or women who "gave their affection and sex and love to other men but never to me." Rodger is not considered a terrorist because he is considered to have acted out of "personal agony" instead of ideology.

== See also ==
- 2006 Baton Rouge church shooting
- Charleston church shooting
