= McGinty's Department Store =

General store in Missouri, United States

- Industry: Department store
- Founded: 1904
- Defunct: 2001
- Fate: sold by family in 1991, officially closed in 2001
- Headquarters: Neosho, Missouri
- Key people: A.C. McGinty, Hale McGinty

McGinty's Department Store was a general goods department store located in Neosho, Missouri, the county seat of Newton County, Missouri. McGinty's sat on the south side of Neosho Square, on the southeast corner of the intersection of Main Street and Wood Street. The building is located in the Neosho Commercial Historic District, but is considered a non-contributing building.

== History ==
McGinty's Department Store was opened in 1904 by A.C. McGinty. In addition to running his department store, A.C. McGinty also served as the president of Neosho's First National Bank.

In 1939, A.C. McGinty's son Hale McGinty began working at the department store and remained in active management until 1991, when his family sold their active share of the business. The McGinty name remained on the business until 2001.

The McGinty family had also at one time been part owners of the McGinty-Frohlich Department Store in Monett, Missouri, which is now Brownsberger's Clothing.
