= James Bishop (artist) =

American painter (1927–2021)

- Born: October 7, 1927; Neosho, Missouri, U.S.
- Died: February 16, 2021 (aged 93); Dreux, France
- Education: Syracuse University (1950); Washington University in St. Louis (1954); Black Mountain College (1953) Columbia University (1956)
- Style: Painting
- Movement: Abstract expressionism

James Daniel Bishop (October 7, 1927 – February 16, 2021) was an American painter. He completed his education in the United States, before moving to France in 1957 and living there for most of his career. He was granted a Guggenheim Fellowship in 1970.

== Early life ==
Bishop was born in Neosho, Missouri, on October 7, 1927. He was the only child of Otto McMaster Bishop and Faye Lenora Robinson Bishop. The family resided at 327 South Washington Street during his childhood. He attended Neosho High School, graduating in 1945. That same year, he enrolled in Syracuse University in Syracuse, New York, and later obtained his bachelor's degree in journalism.

== Art career ==
Bishop's formal art education began in 1950, when he entered the Sam Fox School of Design & Visual Arts at Washington University in St. Louis and studied there for three years. He was subsequently accepted into the Yale-Norfolk Summer Art School in Norfolk, Connecticut. He also studied at Black Mountain College under Esteban Vicente, before spending one year at Columbia College studying art history with Meyer Schapiro.

Bishop went on to reside in Italy, then Greece, before relocating to France in 1957 and settling there for most of his career. He had his first one-man show at the Galerie Lucien Durand in Paris in November 1963. He was awarded a Guggenheim Fellowship for fine arts in 1970. His "Paintings and Works on Paper" journeyed to the Kunstmuseum Winterthur in Switzerland, the Galerie nationale du Jeu de Paume in Paris, and the Westphalian State Museum of Art and Cultural History in Germany, as part of a survey from 1993 to 1994.

Bishop's style was tied to the post-World War II tradition of abstract art from both the US and Europe. The artwork he produced was compared to numerous movements like abstract expressionism and Supports/Surfaces, although Bishop called himself "an Abstract Expressionist of the quieter branch". One of the most powerful features of his work was the manner in which it alluded to "frames and methods of presentation", which appeared to call to mind minimalism. He utilized the "nuanced and expressive qualities" of color and scale to great effect, leading John Ashbery to dub his works that employed light as "half architecture, half air".

Bishop had an exhibition of works on paper from 2007 until 2008 at the Josef Albers Museum in Bottrop, Germany. In its October 2008 issue, Art in America published "Painting by Other Means" by Joe Fyfe, a major review of Bishop work. The exhibition also traveled to the Staatliche Graphische Sammlung München and the Art Institute of Chicago. Six years later, the David Zwirner Gallery in New York hosted a solo exhibition of his work.

== Later life ==
Bishop lived and worked in Blévy, near Maillebois in rural Eure-et-Loir, until his death. His work was scheduled to be shown at the Musée d'Arts de Nantes starting on February 12, 2021. This was part of an exhibition titled "United States of Abstraction", covering the contribution of Americans to the post-World War II art scene in Paris. However, this was delayed due to the COVID-19 pandemic in France. He died on February 16, 2021, at a hospital in Dreux. He was 93.

== Notable exhibitions ==
- 1963: Galerie Lucien Durand, Paris, France
- 1966: Fischbach Gallery, New York, New York
- 1993: Kunstmuseum Winterthur, Switzerland
- 2007: Josef Albers Museum, Bottrop, Germany
- 2008: Staatliche Graphische Sammlung, Munich, Germany
- 2014: David Zwirner, New York, New York

== Notable collections ==
- Farm, 1966, oil on canvas; in the collection of the San Francisco Museum of Modern Art
- Untitled, 1980, oil on canvas; in the collection of the Art Institute of Chicago
- Untitled, 2002, oil, pencil and colored pencil on paper; in the collection of the Museum of Modern Art
