= Travis Phelps =

American baseball player (born 1977)

- Pitcher
- Born: July 25, 1977 (age 49); Rocky Comfort, Missouri, U.S.
- Batted: Right Threw: Right

MLB debut
- April 19, 2001, for the Tampa Bay Devil Rays

Last MLB appearance
- September 11, 2004, for the Milwaukee Brewers

MLB statistics
- Win–loss record: 3–5
- Earned run average: 4.34
- Strikeouts: 93
- Stats at Baseball Reference

Teams
- Tampa Bay Devil Rays (2001–2002); Milwaukee Brewers (2004)

Travis Howard Phelps (born July 25, 1977) is an American former Major League Baseball pitcher. He played in Major League Baseball from 2001-2004 for the Tampa Bay Devil Rays and Milwaukee Brewers.

== Playing career ==
Born in Rocky Comfort, Missouri, Phelps was drafted in the 89th round of the 1996 Major League Baseball draft.

Phelps made his major league debut with the then Tampa Bay Devil Rays on April 19, 2001, when he pitched two scoreless innings in the Rays 8–3 loss to the Boston Red Sox. He would go on to make 49 appearances out of the Bullpen for the Rays that year and 26 more in 2002. He last played in the majors in 2004 when he made 4 appearances for the Milwaukee Brewers, but would play for a number of years in the minors and independent leagues.

On January 6, 2009, Phelps signed a minor league contract with the Detroit Tigers, hoping to make it back to the major leagues. However, he was released by the Tigers at the end of spring training and signed with the York Revolution, with whom he had spent the previous season. He became a free agent at the end of the 2009 season and did not play for another professional team.

=== Coaching ===
Phelps was hired as the Staten Island Yankees pitching coach in 2016. Since becoming the Pitching coach the team has posted the lowest team ERA each season from 2016 to 2018.
