= Neosho Commercial Historic District =

Historic district in Neosho, Missouri, United States

- U.S. National Register of Historic Places
- U.S. Historic district
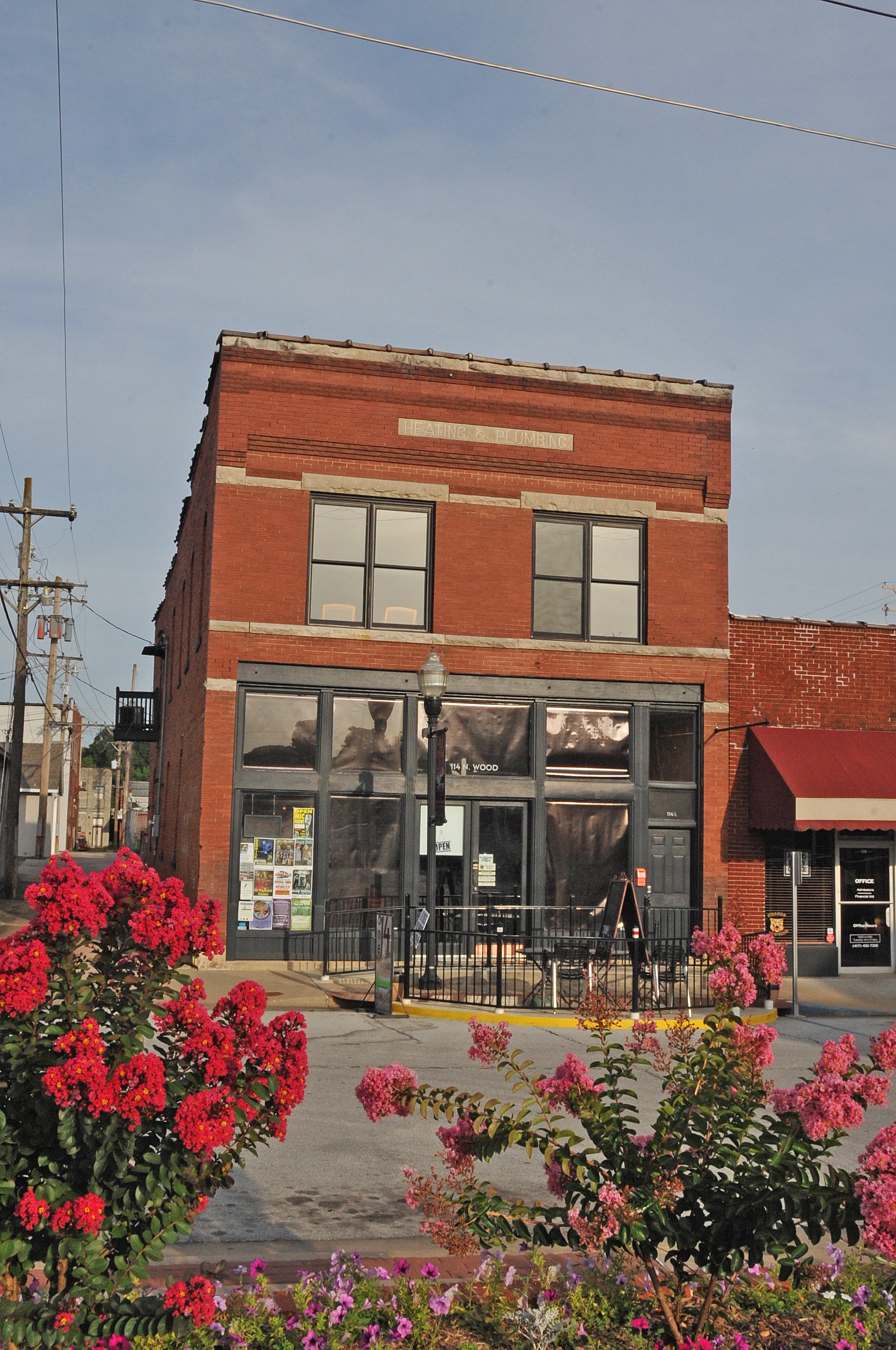
- Neosho Commercial Historic District, January 2009

- Location within Missouri Location within the United States
- Location: Along sections of Main, Spring, Washington and Wood Sts., Neosho, Missouri
- Coordinates: 36°52′11″N 94°22′03″W
- Area: 10 acres (4.0 ha)
- Architect: Davis, Neal C.
- Architectural style: Late 19th And 20th Century Revivals, Late Victorian, Modern Movement
- MPS: Neosho MPS
- NRHP reference No.: 93000722, 07000323 (Boundary Increase)
- Added to NRHP: August 12, 1993, April 18, 2007 (Boundary Increase)

Neosho Commercial Historic District is a historic district in northeastern Neosho, Missouri, United States, that is listed on the National Register of Historic Places (NRHP).

== Description ==
The district encompasses 38 contributing buildings in the central business district of Neosho. It developed between about 1868 and 1943, and includes representative examples of Victorian and Modern Movement architecture. Notable buildings include the Newton County Courthouse (1936), Newton County Jail (1888), Haas Building (1906), First National Bank (1922), Auditorium and City Hall (1938), Masonic Lodge (1883, 1913), and Newton County Bank (1884).

It was listed on the NRHP August 12, 1993, with a boundary increase on April 18, 2007.

== See also ==
- National Register of Historic Places listings in Newton County, Missouri
