= Neosho High School =

- U.S. National Register of Historic Places
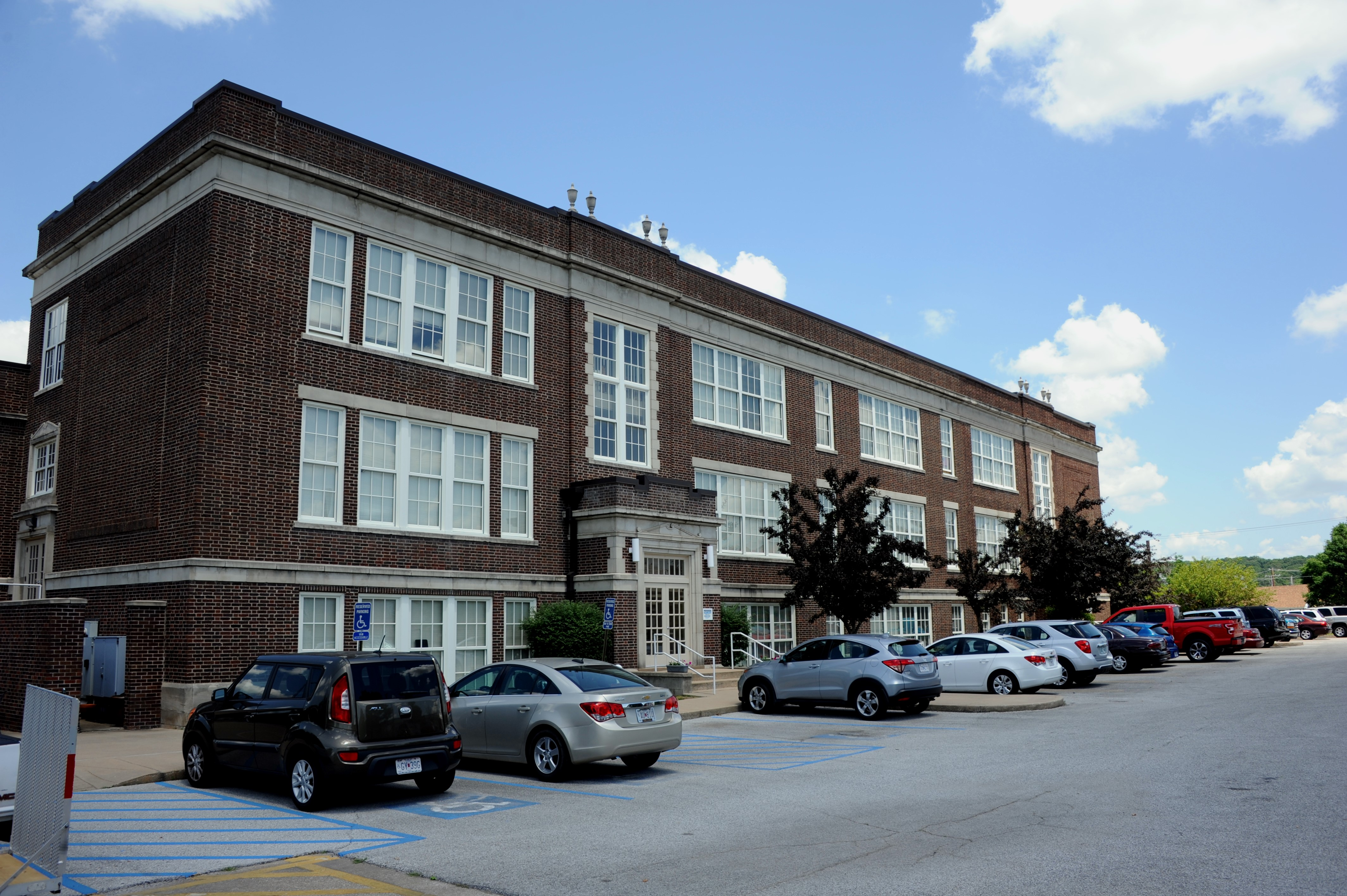

- Location within Missouri Location within the United States
- Location: W. McCord and N. Wood Sts., Neosho, Missouri
- Coordinates: 36°52′16″N 94°22′09″W
- Area: less than one acre
- Built: 1917, 1940
- Built by: J.B. Wagor
- Architect: Neal C. Davis
- Architectural style: Late 19th And 20th Century Revivals
- MPS: Neosho MPS
- NRHP reference No.: 02000906
- Added to NRHP: August 30, 2002

Neosho High School, also known as Neosho Intermediate School, is a historic high school building located at Neosho, Newton County, Missouri. It was built in 1916–17, and is a two-story, U-shaped, brick and stone trimmed building with Gothic Revival and Classical Revival style design elements. The building measures approximately 101 feet by 127 feet. Also on the property is the contributing two-story giraffe rock ancillary building, built as a vocational facility for the school in 1940.

It was listed on the National Register of Historic Places in 2002.

== Notable alumni ==
- James Bishop – Painter
- Preston Lacy – Actor
- Jacqueline Scott – Actress
