= Lentz–Carter Merchandise Store =

- U.S. National Register of Historic Places
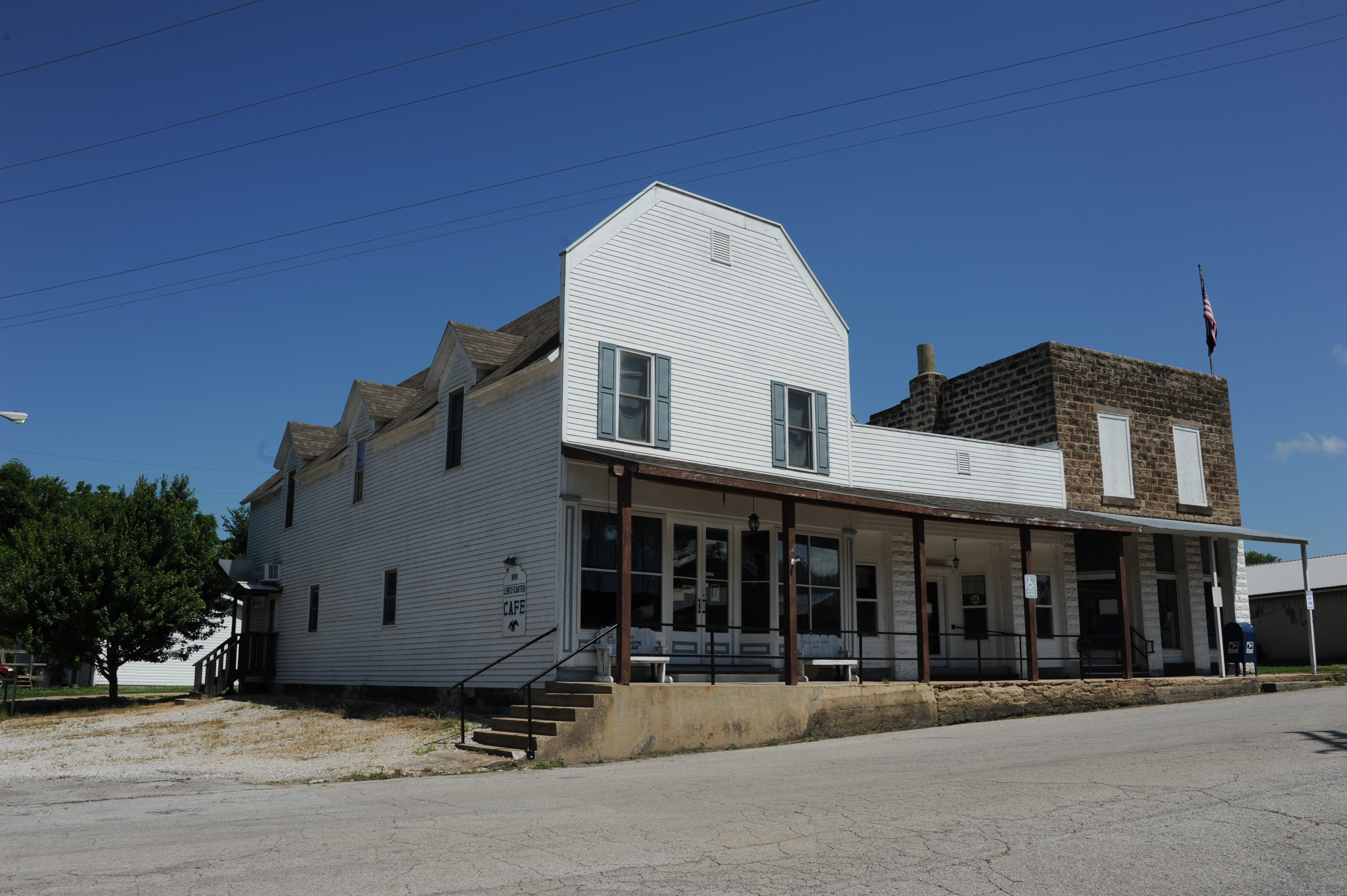

- Location within Missouri Location within the United States
- Location: 744 Ozark St. Stella, Missouri
- Coordinates: 36°45′38″N 94°11′35″W
- Area: less than one acre
- Built: 1890
- Architectural style: Two-part commercial block
- NRHP reference No.: 08000799
- Added to NRHP: August 19, 2008

Lentz–Carter Merchandise Store, also known as Lentz–Carter Building, is a historic general store located at Stella, Newton County, Missouri. It was built in 1890, and is a two-story, frame building sheathed in clapboard. It measures approximately 60 feet by 22 feet, sits on a limestone foundation, and has a gable roof. It features an intact original storefront. It is the oldest building standing in Stella.

It was listed on the National Register of Historic Places in 2008.
