= Neosho National Fish Hatchery =

U.S. federal fish hatchery

Coordinates: 36°51′54″N 94°21′38″W

The Neosho National Fish Hatchery is the oldest federal fish hatchery in operation today. It is one of 69 fish hatcheries operated by the US Fish and Wildlife Service. It was established in 1888.

== History ==
Neosho, located in the Ozark Mountain region of southwest Missouri, was chosen for the hatchery site because of access to spring water and the railroad. Land for the fish hatchery was purchased from Lemuel B. and Mary A. Hearrell for $2,472. The first source of water for the hatchery, Hearrell Spring, was purchased from the Hearrells for $1 and provided 300 gallons of water per minute. By 1890, the fish hatchery was a productive fish station raising seven species of warm and cold water fish. In 1907, McMahon Spring was added to increase the hatchery water supply to 1,000 gallons per minute.

A rehabilitation program was undertaken at the fish hatchery in 1961. A new, modern, tile and brick hatchery building replaced the 1890 hatching house. All trout rearing facilities were removed and replaced with 12 concrete raceways. The title was obtained for 244 acres (0.99 km^{2}) of land on the Fort Crowder Military Reservation near Neosho upon which Elm and Bartholic Springs are located. This provided an additional 500 gallons per minute to the hatchery's water supply.

== Role of Fish Hatcheries in conservation ==
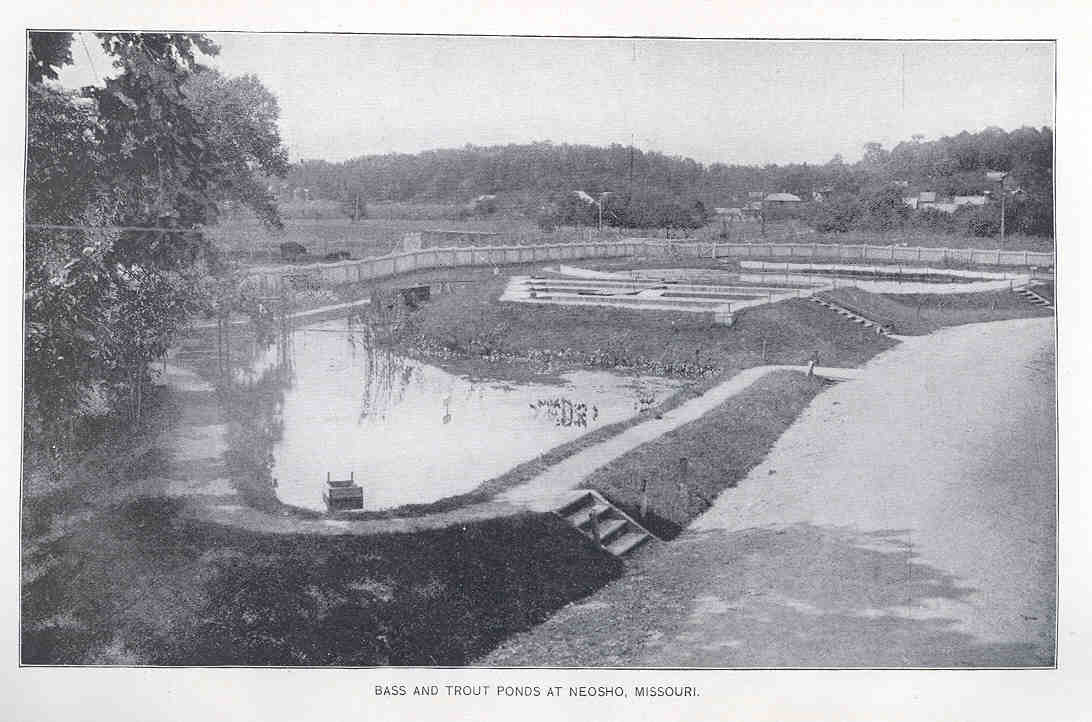
Neosho Hatchery in 1896

The US Fish and Wildlife Service operates fish hatcheries throughout the United States. These hatcheries are a significant part of fisheries conservation and restoration efforts by producing and releasing rare, endangered and other fish back into America’s lakes and rivers. Some of these hatcheries also help mitigate the loss of fishing from the large federal dams built in the last century.

Over 130 species of cold, cool, and warm water fish have been produced at the Neosho NFH since it was established. The current focus is on paddlefish and lake sturgeon restoration, pallid sturgeon recovery, production of rainbow trout for mitigation, and native mussel propagation.

The staff at the Neosho Fish Hatchery also protect the endangered Ozark cavefish in one of the springs that supplies the hatchery with water. In 1989, staff discovered Ozark cavefish using the spring. In 2002 efforts were taken to protect the area surrounding.

The hatchery water supply is from four gravity flow underground springs, located up to four miles (6 km) from the hatchery. The 1,500 gallons of 54- to 64-degree, high-quality water per minute allows hatchery staff to produce up to 90,000 pounds of fish annually and to rear several species of imperiled fish and other aquatic species.

=== Current programs ===
- Recovery efforts for endangered pallid sturgeon
- Protection for endangered Ozark cavefish
- Recovery efforts for threatened or endangered native mussels
- Restoration efforts for candidate species, lake sturgeon
- Restoration efforts for candidate species, paddlefish
- Mandated mitigation of rainbow trout for Lake Taneycomo, Missouri
- Outreach and educational opportunities for public through guided hatchery tours and offsite presentations
