= Second Baptist Church (Neosho, Missouri) =

Historic church in Missouri, United States

- U.S. National Register of Historic Places
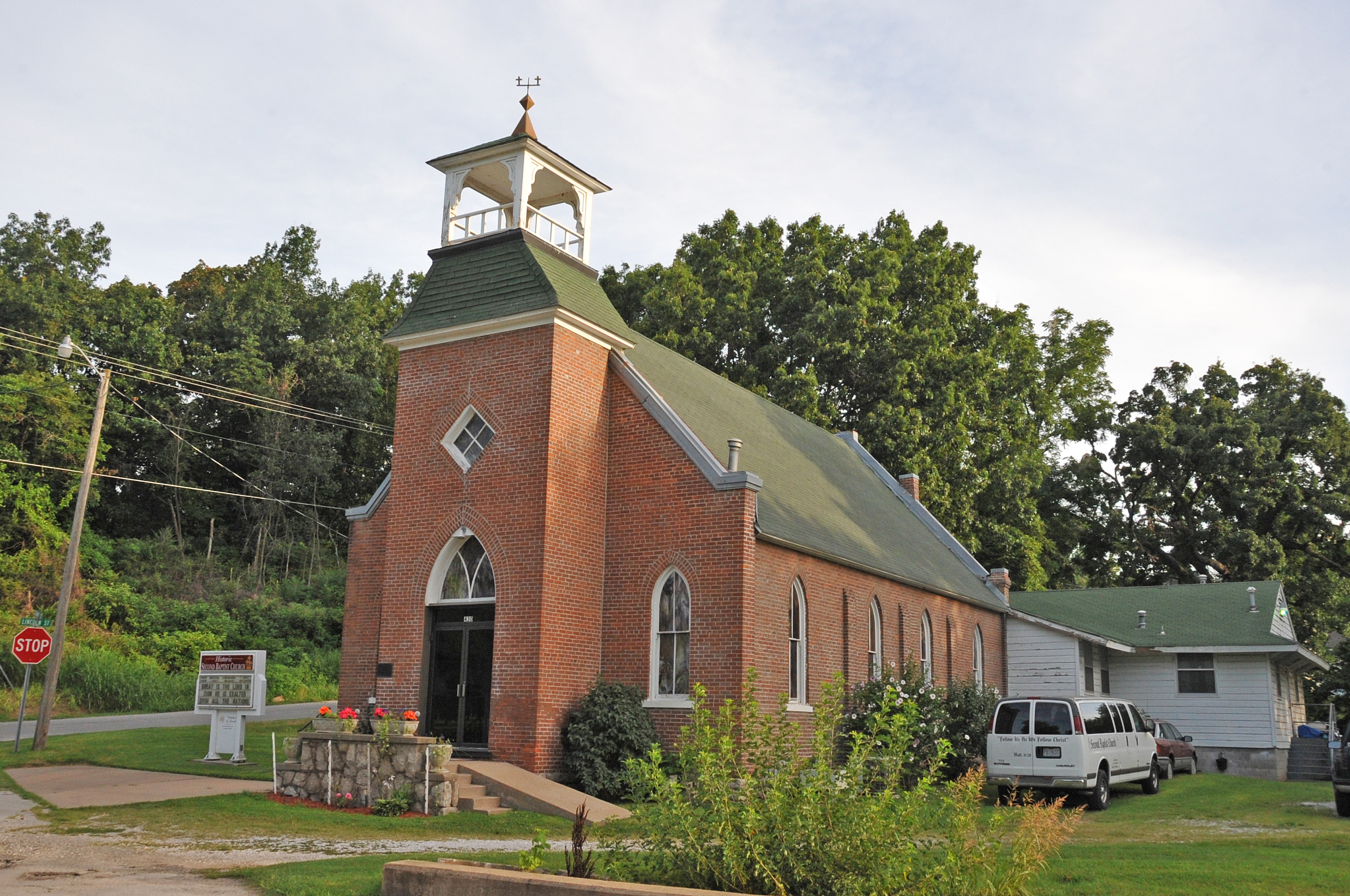

- Location within Missouri Location within the United States
- Location: 430 W. Grant St., Neosho, Missouri
- Coordinates: 36°52′31″N 94°22′29″W
- Area: less than one acre
- Built: 1896
- Architectural style: Late Gothic Revival
- NRHP reference No.: 95001495
- Added to NRHP: January 4, 1996

The Second Baptist Church, also known as Pleasant Hill Baptist Church, is a historic African-American Baptist church located at Neosho, Newton County, Missouri. It was built in 1896, and is a one-story, rectangular brick building with Gothic Revival style design elements. It sits on a stone foundation, has a gable roof, and features a projecting, centered, two-story brick belfry.

It was listed on the National Register of Historic Places in 1996.
