= Neosho Wholesale Grocery Company =

- U.S. National Register of Historic Places
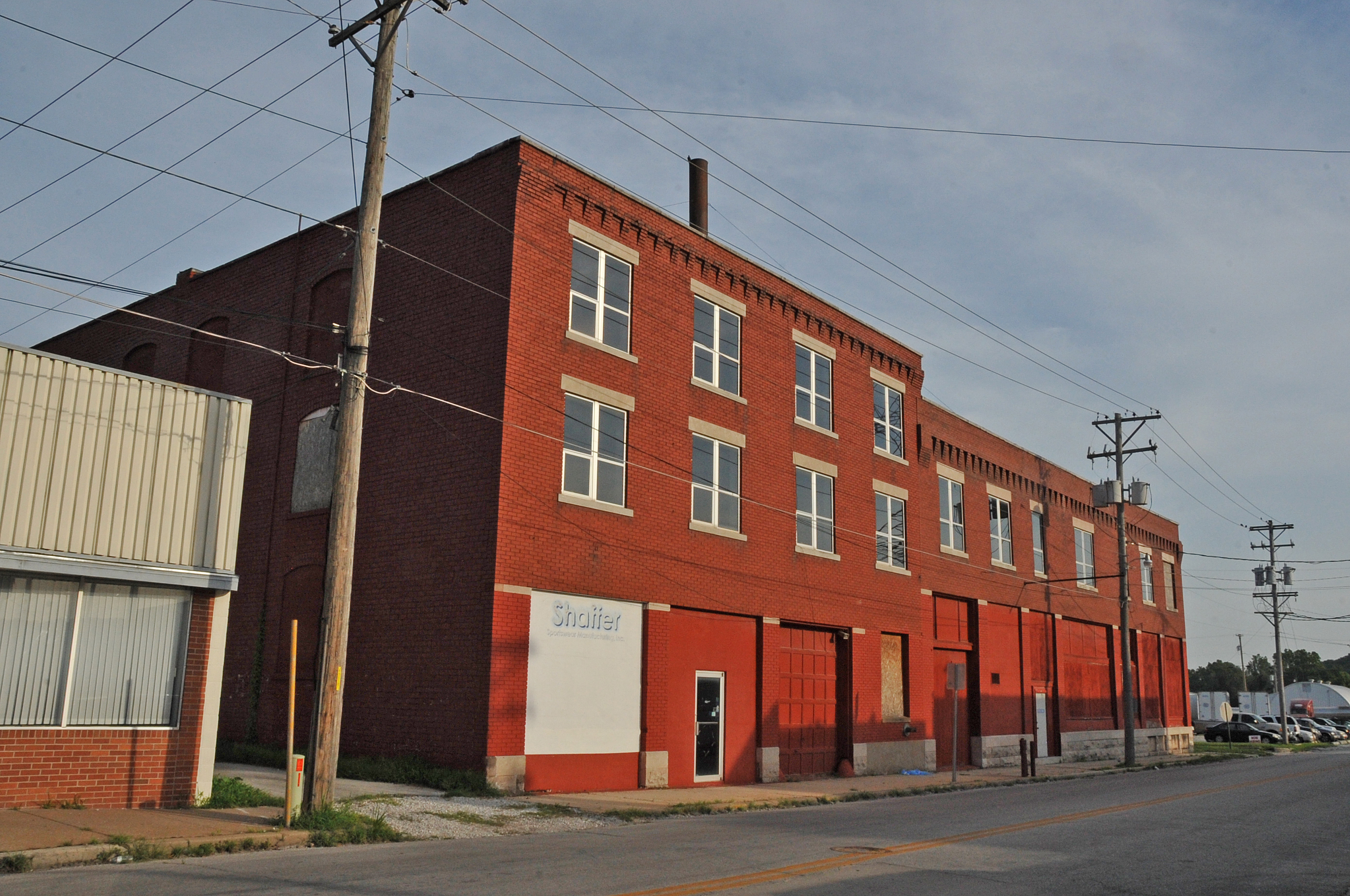
- Neosho Wholesale Grocery Company, January 2009

- Location within Missouri Location within the United States
- Location: 224 N. Washington St., Neosho, Missouri
- Coordinates: 36°52′17″N 94°22′2″W
- Area: less than one acre
- Built: 1908, c. 1922
- NRHP reference No.: 13000171
- Added to NRHP: April 16, 2013

Neosho Wholesale Grocery Company, also known as North Transfer and Storage, is a historic warehouse building located at Neosho, Newton County, Missouri. The north section was built in 1908, and the south section added about 1922. The two- to three-story brick building features large storefronts, a corbelled brick cornice, and a painted wall sign.

It was listed on the National Register of Historic Places in 2013.
