= Stella, Missouri =

Village in Newton County, Missouri, United States

- Village
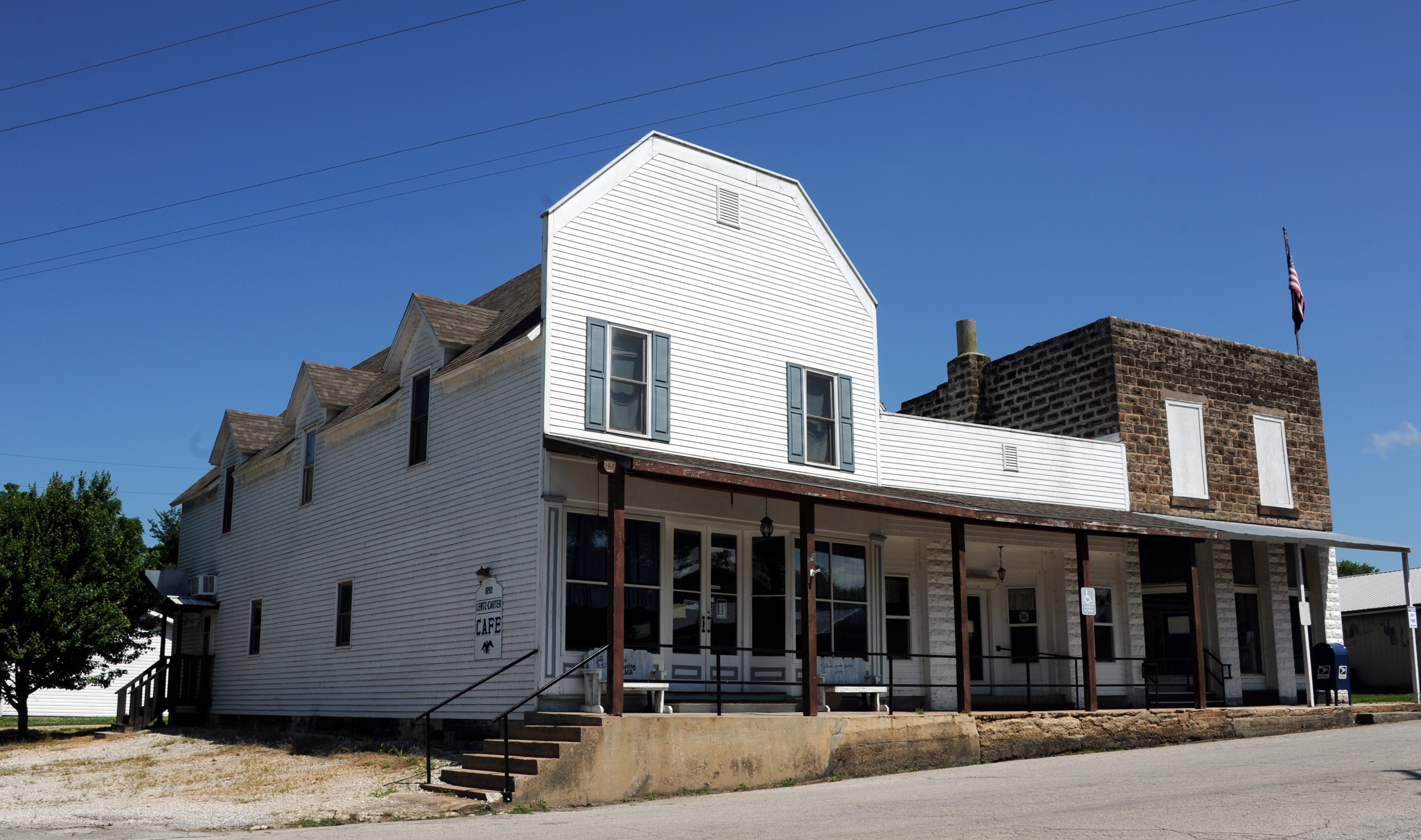
- Historic Lentz-Carter Merchandise Store

- Location of Stella, Missouri
- Coordinates: 36°45′45″N 94°11′28″W
- Country: United States
- State: Missouri
- County: Newton

Area
  - Total: 0.16 sq mi (0.42 km^{2})
  - Land: 0.16 sq mi (0.42 km^{2})
  - Water: 0 sq mi (0.00 km^{2})
- Elevation: 1,155 ft (352 m)

Population (2020)
  - Total: 166
  - Density: 1,015.6/sq mi (392.12/km^{2})
- Time zone: UTC-6 (Central (CST))
  - Summer (DST): UTC-5 (CDT)
- ZIP code: 64867
- Area code: 417
- FIPS code: 29-70648
- GNIS feature ID: 2397681

Stella is a village in southern Newton County, Missouri, United States. The population was 158 at the 2010 census. It is part of the Joplin, Missouri Metropolitan Statistical Area. The village of Stella is located 17 miles southeast of Neosho.

== History ==
The first known settlers of this area arrived in the early 1820s. The area of Stella was previously a fishing community called Springs. In October 1880, the St. Louis and San Francisco Railroad sold a portion of what became Stella to Moses Eagle for $200. Moses Eagle's family arrived in the area in 1844. Stella became an incorporated town in 1930. The village was named after Moses Eagle's granddaughter. The water-powered grist mill was built in 1867 by Eagle. The Bank of Stella was established circa 1900. The area's first newspaper, the Amicus Curio, was started in 1901 by a doctor from Kent, Missouri, with the Stella Enterprise and the Stella Weekly Record established after that. The Horner Institute merged with the Stella Academy in 1911 and was located there until moving to Purdy in 1912. The Stella Baptist Church was established in 1886, with the actual church built circa 1911, the Stella Methodist Church circa 1896, while the Stella Church of Christ was established after 1950.

The Lentz-Carter Merchandise Store was listed on the National Register of Historic Places in 2008.

== Geography ==
Stella is located on the northeast side of South Indian Creek, one-half mile north of the Newton-McDonald county line. Access is via Missouri Routes O and F, and Missouri Route 76 passes approximately 2.5 miles to the south.

According to the United States Census Bureau, the village has a total area of 0.16 square miles (0.41 km^{2}), all land.

== Demographics ==
Historical population
Census	Pop.	Note	%±
1930	226		—
1940	221		−2.2%
1950	177		−19.9%
1960	166		−6.2%
1970	197		18.7%
1980	230		16.8%
1990	132		−42.6%
2000	178		34.8%
2010	158		−11.2%
2020	166		5.1%
U.S. Decennial Census

=== 2010 census ===
As of the census of 2010, there were 158 people, 65 households, and 40 families residing in the village. The population density was 987.5 inhabitants per square mile (381.3/km^{2}). There were 83 housing units at an average density of 518.8 units per square mile (200.3 units/km^{2}). The racial makeup of the village was 89.9% White, 5.1% Native American, and 5.1% Asian. Hispanic or Latino of any race were 0.6% of the population.

There were 65 households, of which 36.9% had children under the age of 18 living with them, 44.6% were married couples living together, 13.8% had a female householder with no husband present, 3.1% had a male householder with no wife present, and 38.5% were non-families. 33.8% of all households were made up of individuals, and 17% had someone living alone who was 65 years of age or older. The average household size was 2.43 and the average family size was 3.20.

The median age in the village was 37.5 years. 27.8% of residents were under the age of 18; 10.2% were between the ages of 18 and 24; 22.3% were from 25 to 44; 25.3% were from 45 to 64; and 14.6% were 65 years of age or older. The gender makeup of the village was 48.7% male and 51.3% female.

=== 2000 census ===
As of the census of 2000, there were 178 people, 74 households, and 46 families residing in the town. The population density was 1,152.7 inhabitants per square mile (445.1/km^{2}). There were 87 housing units at an average density of 563.4 units per square mile (217.5 units/km^{2}). The racial makeup of the town was 98.31% White, 0.56% Native American, and 1.12% from two or more races. Hispanic or Latino of any race were 1.12% of the population.

There were 74 households, out of which 29.7% had children under the age of 18 living with them, 48.6% were married couples living together, 9.5% had a female householder with no husband present, and 36.5% were non-families. 31.1% of all households were made up of individuals, and 17.6% had someone living alone who was 65 years of age or older. The average household size was 2.41 and the average family size was 2.98.

In the town the population was spread out, with 29.2% under the age of 18, 6.2% from 18 to 24, 29.8% from 25 to 44, 16.3% from 45 to 64, and 18.5% who were 65 years of age or older. The median age was 36 years. For every 100 females, there were 97.8 males. For every 100 females age 18 and over, there were 100.0 males.

The median income for a household in the town was $25,781, and the median income for a family was $25,417. Males had a median income of $27,813 versus $16,458 for females. The per capita income for the town was $11,799. About 14.6% of families and 12.4% of the population were below the poverty line, including 13.8% of those under the age of eighteen and 3.7% of those 65 or over.

== Cardwell Hospital ==
=== Clarence C. Cardwell ===
Despite Stella's small size, for nearly 60 years the Cardwell Hospital, later the Cardwell Memorial Osteopathic Hospital, attracted people from the largely rural surrounding areas of Newton County, Barry County and McDonald County for their healthcare needs. Cardwell Hospital was opened in 1920 by World War I veteran Clarence C. Cardwell, who had been born only two miles outside of Stella in 1892. At first the hospital was only four rooms, but later expanded to meet the needs of the local community. By 1930 a second doctor had joined the staff at Cardwell and it had 10 beds available for patients. A fire in 1942 damaged the hospital, but Cardwell quickly had the building rebuilt. Cardwell continued running the hospital with his wife, Ida Cardwell, and their daughter, Cleta Cardwell, until his death in November 1956. At the time of his death the Cardwell Hospital was reported to have grown to 100 beds.

Following Cardwell's death in November 1956, the Cardwell Hospital was closed for a short time, until it was purchased from Ida and Cleta Cardwell by Silas and Lillian Fountain and reopened on February 11, 1957, as the Cardwell Memorial Osteopathic Hospital. The Fountains, a married couple from Sulphur Springs, Arkansas, had both graduated from the Kansas City College of Osteopathy and Surgery. Their daughter Mary Sue Fountain served as the hospital administrator. Following her husband's death on June 29, 1973, Lillian Fountain continued running the hospital until 1977. Before the closure of the hospital in 1977 Roy Still a patient of the hospital that was wheelchair bound disappeared from the hospital and was never found. Lillian Fountain died on October 13, 1996.

=== Hospital closure and EPA clean up ===
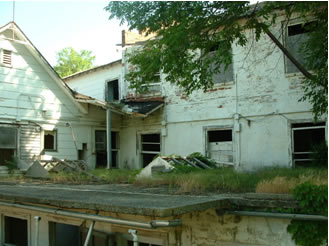
The former Cardwell Hospital in Stella, Missouri in 2004, shortly before it was torn down and removed because of asbestos contamination.

Cardwell Memorial Osteopathic Hospital closed in 1977, but the building was soon reopened as a residential care facility owned by Don and Vera Littlefield. But this venture proved short lived and the building was vacant by the mid-1980s. After sitting empty for nearly 20 years, the residents of Stella, seeking to revive the town's business district, proposed a plan to convert the empty hospital building into a multipurpose building complex, which would house a clinic, a library, city hall, retail space and residential units. However, due to considerable asbestos contamination at the site, the decision was made to remove the now derelict structure. Because of the nature of the contamination, the Environmental Protection Agency declared the former Cardwell Hospital building a superfund site and assisted the town in removing it. In the summer of 2006, the former Cardwell Hospital was torn down and the site was decontaminated, making it safe for other uses. Following the removal of the building, the site was redeveloped as the Stella Veterans Memorial Park, which is dedicated to veterans from the Stella area.

=== Community of doctors ===
During the years of the Cardwell Hospital, especially during Clarence Cardwell's ownership, the town of Stella is thought to have produced more than 30 doctors and dentists, most of which are believed to have had experience working in the former Cardwell Hospital during their youth.

== See also ==
- List of cities in Missouri
