= 2006 Baton Rouge church shooting =

Mass shooting in Louisiana, U.S.

- Location: Baton Rouge, Louisiana, United States
- Date: May 21, 2006; 20 years ago (CDT; UTC−05:00)
- Attack type: Mass shooting; mass murder
- Weapon: Revolver
- Deaths: 5
- Injuries: 1
- Perpetrator: Anthony Bell
- Verdict: Guilty on all counts
- Convictions: First-degree murder (x5); Attempted first-degree murder
- Sentence: Death

On May 21, 2006, at the Ministry of Jesus Christ Church in Baton Rouge, Louisiana, a gunman opened fire at a church, killing four people (who were the relatives of the gunman's wife) and wounding a pastor. The 25-year-old gunman, Anthony Bell (born October 13, 1980), subsequently killed his estranged wife after kidnapping her from the church and then shot her inside an apartment complex. Bell was arrested on the same day of the shootings and was charged with multiple counts of first-degree murder and attempted first-degree murder. Bell was found guilty of all charges and sentenced to death on September 12, 2008.

== Shooting ==
During a morning service at the Ministry of Jesus Christ Church, where six adults and five children were present for the event, a 25-year-old man named Anthony Bell entered the church and asked his estranged wife for reconciliation, which she refused. Bell returned with a handgun and opened fire inside the church with six bullets, fatally shooting four individuals and wounding another before abducting his wife Erica Bell and their three children. The victims — all relatives of Erica and Bell's in-laws — were identified as Leonard and Gloria Howard, Erica's grandparents (aged 78 and 72), Dolores McGrew, her 68-year-old great-aunt, and Darlene Mills Selvage, her 47-year-old cousin. The church's pastor, Claudia Brown, also the mother of Erica, was shot in the back of the head, but she was still alive and managed to ask one of the remaining two children to call for help.

After the shooting, Bell fled with his wife and their three children. Subsequently, Bell parked his car at the parking lot of a nearby apartment complex, where he shot and killed Erica, who was 24 years old at the time of her death. Bell, however, spared the lives of his children. He later dialed 911 and reported that his wife had killed herself. Upon the arrival of police, Bell was arrested and taken into custody for the murders of his wife and her four relatives. All six victims had been shot in the head. Brown, the sole survivor of the shooting, was taken to a hospital for treatment and she eventually survived her wounds despite the severity of her wounds.

Evidence showed that prior to the shooting, Erica had obtained a temporary restraining order against her husband in 2005, as a result of Bell's alleged abuse of his wife and infidelity, making it likely that the shooting was connected to domestic violence.

== Charges and pre-trial process ==
After his arrest, Anthony Bell was charged with multiple counts of murder, attempted murder and kidnapping. On June 15, 2006, a grand jury formally indicted Bell for five counts of first-degree murder and one count of attempted first-degree murder. Baton Rouge prosecutor Mark Dumaine confirmed that he would seek the death penalty for Bell, calling the shooting the "most heinous" he ever handled as a prosecutor.

By April 2007, Bell had undergone at least three psychiatric assessments to determine his mental competency to claim trial for the church shootings.

In July 2007, a psychologist for the defence testified in a pre-trial hearing that Bell possessed the mental ability of a young child and was therefore mentally incompetent to stand trial for the murders of his wife and four in-laws.

On September 1, 2007, District Judge Todd Hernandez ruled that Bell was mentally competent to stand trial for the murders, accepting the evidence from two other psychiatric experts that Bell was fit to plead and claim trial for the shooting. A month later, Bell requested to represent himself and fire his lawyers as they were allegedly not protecting his rights or compliant with his instructions, but the request was denied. Bell eventually relented and dropped his request to represent himself at trial in November 2007.

On December 14, 2007, Bell's lawyers argued that the possibility of Bell receiving the death penalty should be quashed on the grounds that Bell had an Intelligence quotient in the low 50's, but the judge kept the death penalty as a possibility.

On February 28, 2008, Bell's second request to represent himself in his trial was accepted by District Judge Todd Hernandez.

== Trial of Anthony Bell ==
The trial of Anthony Bell was scheduled on March 31, 2008. Although Bell requested to delay the trial to allow him more time to prepare, the judge did not grant a delay; Bell also filed a second request to have his wife's body exhumed to allow his own forensic experts to examine it. Additionally, out of concerns for her safety due to potential attempts on her life, Claudia Brown, the sole survivor of the shooting, was in protective custody outside of Louisiana leading up to the trial, and her testimony would be taped should the situation render her unable to come to court as a witness. Bell's ex-girlfriend was also allowed to come to court to testify on the domestic violence she experienced from her past relationship from Bell in spite of the defendant's objection.

During the trial itself, Bell claimed that he never killed his in-laws or his wife. Instead, he stated that it was Erica who killed his in-laws in the church before she turned the gun on herself and committed suicide, but the evidence showed that the murder weapon, which was found on the hand of Erica, contained a greater percentage of Bell's DNA than his wife's, and it was likely to be placed in her hand, and Brown also testified that she heard her mother Gloria Howard (one of the four fatally shot by Bell) shouting "Don't shoot me Anthony" before she was gunned down.

On April 11, 2008, after two hours of deliberation, an East Baton Rouge Parish jury found Bell guilty of all five counts of first-degree murder and one count of attempted first-degree murder. Through his conviction for the most serious charge of first-degree murder, Bell faced a potential sentence of life in prison without parole or the death penalty. The sentencing of Bell was delayed to April 14, 2008.

On April 17, 2008, the jury returned with their verdict on sentence, unanimously recommending Bell to receive the death penalty for each count of first-degree murder. Formal sentencing was scheduled on September 4, 2008.

On September 11, 2008, 27-year-old Anthony Bell was formally sentenced to death by District Judge Todd Hernandez. Bell was handed a total of five consecutive death sentences for all the murder charges preferred against him, in addition to 50 years in prison for the attempted murder charge.

== Current status of Bell ==
After he was sentenced to death, Anthony Bell was transferred to the Louisiana State Penitentiary, where he was incarcerated on death row since his sentencing in 2008. In 2023, it was revealed that Bell was one of 57 inmates to remain on Louisiana's death row that year.

in February 2025, Louisiana announced plans to resume executions, ending a 15-year moratorium that had been in place since 2010. On March 18, 2025, the state carried out its first execution in over a decade, putting convicted rapist and murderer Jessie Hoffman Jr. to death using nitrogen hypoxia. As of the day before the execution, March 17, 2025, 56 inmates, including Bell, remained on death row. Following Hoffman's execution, the number dropped to 55.

=== Court appeals ===
After he was sentenced to death, Anthony Bell filed an appeal to the Louisiana Supreme Court against his death sentence. On November 30, 2010, the Louisiana Supreme Court dismissed Bell's appeal, rejecting the defence's arguments that Bell was intellectually disabled and thus should not be executed.

In 2014, Bell's lawyers filed an appeal for a new trial, seeking to overturn the murder convictions and death sentences of Bell, and they argued that he was not supposed to be convicted given that he was mentally incompetent to plead or claim trial or even represent himself as his own lawyer, and they called it a "travesty of justice" for the judicial system to condemn Bell to death row in spite of these concerns. These claims were all rejected by District Judge Todd Hernandez, and subsequently, in April 2017, the Louisiana Supreme Court rejected the follow-up appeal on these claims, including new evidence of alleged brain damage and bipolar disorder which his lawyers claimed were previously undiscovered.

=== 2023 clemency bid ===
In 2023, as Louisiana Governor John Bel Edwards approached the end of his term, he publicly voiced his opposition to the death penalty and advocated for its abolition in the state. Despite his stance, the Louisiana legislature voted on May 24, 2023, to reject a bill that would have ended capital punishment.

A month later, in June 2023, 55 of the 56 inmates on Louisiana's death row — including Anthony Bell — submitted clemency petitions, seeking to have their death sentences commuted to life imprisonment before Edwards left office. These petitions were reviewed by the Louisiana Board of Pardons and Committee on Parole. However, in July 2023, the Board denied all 56 petitions, ruling that the inmates were ineligible because they had filed too soon after the conclusion of their legal appeals; state law required a one-year waiting period after the final appeal decision before a clemency request could be submitted. In October 2023, the Board also rejected additional clemency requests from five other death row inmates, including Antoinette Frank.

== Aftermath ==
When the shooting first occurred, Baton Rouge police chief Jeff LeDuff called it "one of the worst days" in the city and stated that it was a senseless shooting that led to a "total waste of human life". The funerals of the victims were conducted a week after the shooting, and the first funeral was held for Darlene Selvage, with more than 200 people (including family, friends and even local leaders) attending the funeral to pay respects.

In the aftermath of the shooting, the church, where the incident happened, was closed since the occurrence of the shooting, and it had not resumed its operations since. During the first anniversary of the shooting, the families of the five victims expressed that they were still grappling with the emotional aftermath of the incident. The daughter of one of the victims, Darlene Selvage, was placed under the care of her mother's sister and they moved out of Louisiana since the murders. James Mills, the father of Selvage, said that he could not bear to see his eldest daughter's coffin back at the funeral, only wanting to remember her by the last time he saw her alive.

In light of the 2015 Charleston church shooting, where white supremacist Dylann Roof shot and killed nine African-American churchgoers at a black church in South Carolina, the case of Anthony Bell was mentioned as one of the country's high-profile church shootings in the past decade. According to data gathered by USA Today, as of 2015, there were 217 people arrested and charged with mass killings, and 132 of these offenders were sentenced to prison and 15 were sentenced to death, including Bell himself. The rest were either awaiting trial, detained in juvenile facilities or being acquitted. Roof was later found guilty of 33 federal charges of murder and hate crimes, and sentenced to death by the U.S. federal government in 2017, and after losing his appeal and being excluded from then President Joe Biden's clemency pardon for federal death row inmates, Roof remains on death row as of 2025.

In 2017, in light of the Sutherland Springs church shooting, where mass shooter Devin Patrick Kelley killed 26 people in a church in Texas before committing suicide, the residents of Baton Rouge recalled the 2006 church shooting perpetuated by Anthony Bell due to the similarities shared by both incidents. Robert Brown, the father-in-law of Bell, told a newspaper that he had since forgave his son-in-law and stated that Bell had to suffer the consequences of his actions. Robert Brown also stated that whenever such events hit the news, it often brought back the painful memories of losing his daughter. He said that his wife Claudia Brown, who was the sole survivor of the shooting, had since recovered and was still doing well.

Another 2017 report on the Sutherland Springs church shooting revealed that, since 1999, at least 91 people had been killed in 22 or more church-related shootings by that year, and the 2006 Baton Rouge church shooting was one of these cases included in the list.

== See also ==
- Capital punishment in Louisiana
- List of death row inmates in the United States § Louisiana
- List of mass shootings in the United States
