= Neosho, Missouri =

City in Missouri, U.S.

- City
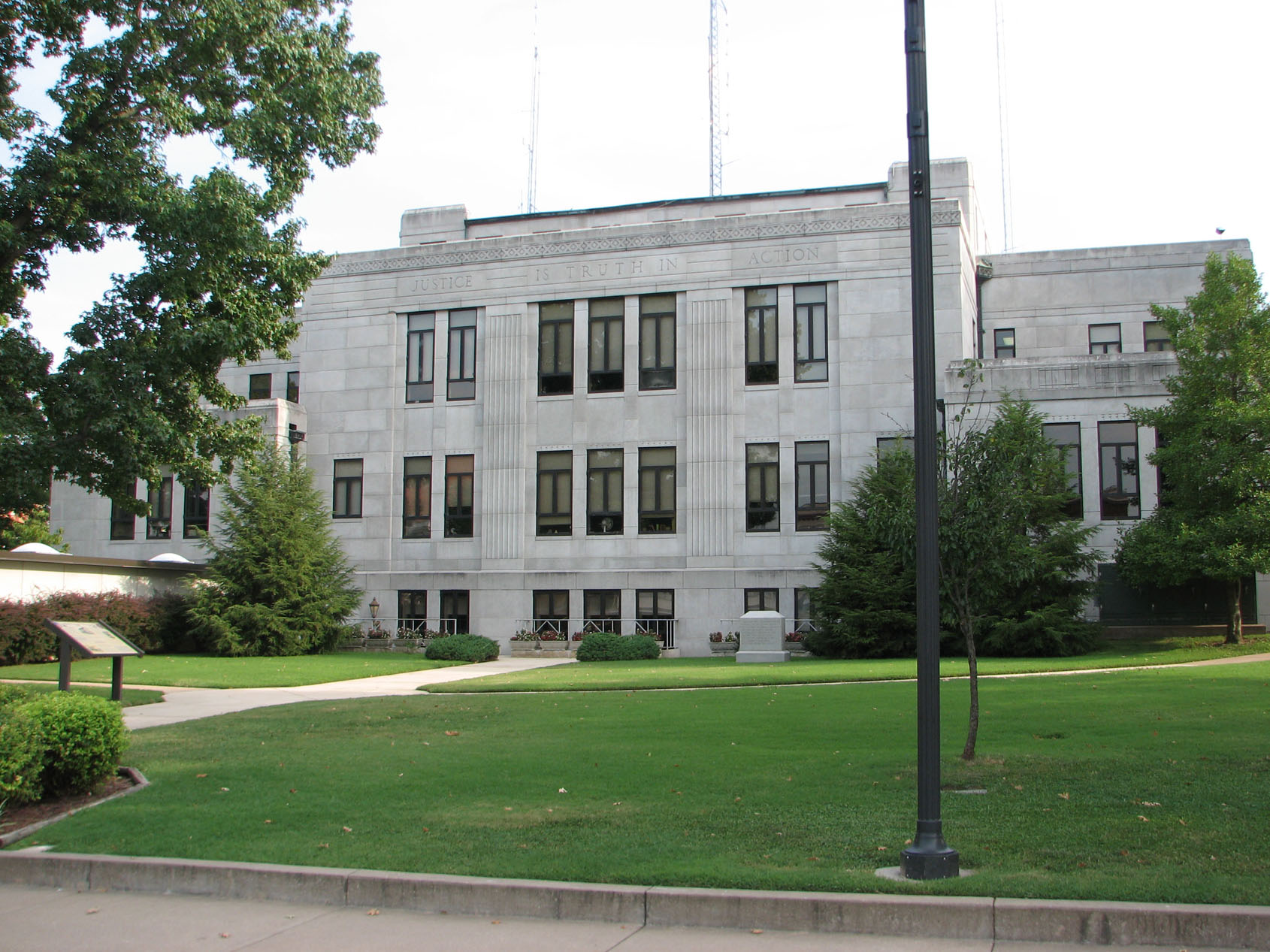
- Newton County Courthouse, 2006
- Nicknames: City of Springs, Flower Box City, Gateway to the Ozarks
- Location of Neosho, Missouri
- Coordinates: 36°51′20″N 94°22′35″W
- Country: United States
- State: Missouri
- County: Newton
- Founded: 1829
- Incorporated: August 20, 1847, again in 1878

Government
  - Type: Council-Manager
  - City Manager: David Kennedy (interim)

Area
  - Total: 15.78 sq mi (40.86 km^{2})
  - Land: 15.75 sq mi (40.80 km^{2})
  - Water: 0.023 sq mi (0.06 km^{2})
- Elevation: 1,037 ft (316 m)

Population (2020)
  - Total: 12,590
  - Density: 799.3/sq mi (308.61/km^{2})
- Time zone: UTC-6 (CST)
  - Summer (DST): UTC-5 (CDT)
- ZIP codes: 64850
- Area code: 417
- FIPS code: 29-51572
- GNIS feature ID: 0723172
- Website: www.neoshomo.gov

Neosho (English: /niˈoʊʃoʊ/ nee-OH-shoh, Osage: [niˈoʒo] or [niˈoʒu]) is the most populous city in and the county seat of Newton County, Missouri, United States. With a population of 12,590 as of the 2020 census, the city is a part of the Joplin metropolitan area, a region with an estimated 176,849 residents, as of 2011. Neosho lies on the western edge of the Ozarks, in the far southwest of the state.

== Description ==
The name "Neosho" is derived from the Osage "Ne-u-zhu", meaning "clear, cold water", "many waters", or "the meeting of waters", and refers to local freshwater springs. The springs attracted varying cultures of Native American inhabitants for thousands of years. The Osage Nation had long occupied the territory at the time of European contact.

European-American settlers, also attracted to the springs, founded the community of Neosho in 1833. It was incorporated as a municipality 1878. Nicknamed "City of Springs", Neosho was historically an agricultural center. Since 1888, it has been the site of the Neosho National Fish Hatchery, the oldest in the National Fish Hatchery System.

It is known locally as the "Gateway to the Ozarks". Since 1957, it has also been identified as "the Flower Box City".

== History ==
=== Settlement: 1829−1845 ===
Starting in the late 1820s, European-American settlers of English, Scottish, German, Welsh, and Scots-Irish ancestry began moving into the area. The first of these settlers was Lunsford Oliver, who migrated from Tennessee in 1829 and located near Shoal Creek. He was the namesake for Oliver's Prairie. His nearest neighbors were in Springfield, sixty miles to the east. In 1831 he was joined by Nathaniel Turner, John Smith, Joseph Ross, Campbell Pure, Blake Wilson, Levi Lee, Carmac Ratcliffe, and George McInturf. McInturf built a corn mill, the first mill of any kind in the region. Soon afterward came Mathew H. Ritchie, who founded the town of Newtonia near Oliver's Prairie, and John W. McCord, who settled near Walbridge Spring with Levie Lee and founded the town Neosho twelve miles (19 km) to the west. In these years, the region was called "Six Bulls", a colloquial reference to "six boils", referring to the large streams that flowed through the area – Shoal Creek, Center Creek, Indian Creek, Spring River, and North Fork.

By 1835, at least three schools had been established along Shoal Creek, and a teacher named Billingsley taught near Neosho. The earliest known religious effort dates to 1836, when Methodist Circuit riders visited the area and held meetings in settlers' log cabins.

In 1843, Rev. Anthony Bewley was appointed to the Neosho and Granby circuit, establishing the first permanent churches in Six Bulls. Rev. John W. McCord was involved in organizing Neosho Presbytery, a Cumberland Presbyterian congregation at New Salem Campground, on May 15, 1837. These early settlers were sometimes visited by Native Americans from the Southeast United States, who had been relocated from Georgia to the Indian Territory a few miles west of later Kansas under the Indian Removal Act. They periodically came into the area on hunting expeditions.

Newton County was originally contained in Crawford County and afterward in Barry County. As the population increased, it was separated from Barry County on December 31, 1838, and established as a county under its present name. It was named in honor of American Revolutionary War veteran Sergeant John Newton. He was a comrade of Sergeant William Jasper, who is memorialized at Fort Moultrie. Later the counties of Jasper, McDonald, and Barton, were successively created from some of Newton's territory.

The first county court session was held at Reed's residence on April 13, 1839, Judge Foster P. Wright presiding. John Reed, Hugh Shannon, and Jacob Testerman sat as judges under appointment by Lilburn Boggs, Governor of Missouri. John Reed was made presiding judge, Thomas Mosely Jr., appointed as clerk; John Haskins, as assessor; and Isaac Gibson as sheriff. Townships were established and roads laid out by this body.

On November 12, the commissioners reported Neosho as the permanent seat of justice, and James Wilson was appointed a special commissioner to lay out the town. The first elected county judges were Edward V. Warren, Larkin Newton, Samuel V. Warren, and Samuel M. Cooley, with Milton Sexton as clerk in 1840. That same year, Milton Sexton, as superintendent, built the first courthouse, a log structure that was occupied in March 1841. In 1841, Charles S. Yancey became circuit judge of the Thirteenth Judicial District, to which Newton County was attached. The first state representative was John Wilson.

In 1840, Lemuel B. Hearrell conducted a school at Hickory Creek, which at times numbered forty pupils. In 1842, Wilson opened the first school in Neosho. He taught classical Latin and higher mathematics. The Methodist Church was active in the area from 1845.

During the 1840s, lead was discovered and entrepreneurs developed mining here. Neosho's early commercial development was dominated by lead and zinc mining. Newton County established one of Missouri's earliest commercial operations. Lead was transported by wagon from Neosho to Indian Territory, then shipped down the Arkansas River and Mississippi River to New Orleans. French colonists had conducted lead mining further east in Missouri before the United States acquired the territory in the Louisiana Purchase of 1803.

=== Realignment: 1846−1861 ===
In 1846, a strip two miles (3.2 km) wide was detached from northern Newton and attached to southern Jasper County. A survey of the community was undertaken in 1846 by F. M. Duncan, who laid out the courthouse square and surrounding blocks. According to the survey, the town covered an area of about 40 acres (16 ha) and was laid off beginning at the "west edge of the large spring and ... northeast of a large white oak", which included land originally belonging to John McCord.

Part of McCord's relinquished land was returned to him. He subdivided it to take advantage of development related to nearby Neosho. This subdivision, later incorporated into the city limits, is still called "McCord's Addition to Neosho". On August 20, 1847, Neosho was legally incorporated with William C. Jones, Jackson C. McKay, Samuel Rice, William B. Holmes, and William B. Mooney as trustees.

The first Baptist congregation was organized at Neosho in 1847, with the Rev. W.H. Farmer as pastor. He served until 1859.

In 1849, McDonald County was created by an act of the state legislature from the southern portion of Newton County, reducing it to its present dimensions. The same act named John Williams of Taney County, James Williams of Barry County, and Chesley Cannifex of Greene County as commissioners to locate the seat of justice within five miles (8.0 km) of the new geographical center of the county. They designated the temporary seat at the home of John Reed, one and one-half miles east of the present site of downtown Neosho. Later the same year, a log jail was built.

The design of the courthouse square followed that of the Shelbyville Square Plan, which has lots arranged to face a central courthouse block. A brick courthouse built in 1850 at a cost of $3,000 replaced the earlier log structure. During the next decade, numerous residential and commercial buildings were constructed in and around the courthouse square. The first newspaper printed in the county was the Neosho Chief, founded in 1854 by J. Webb Graves. It was renamed as the Neosho Herald and was removed in 1861 to Arkansas after the outbreak of the American Civil War. Its records were captured by the Union Army.

By special act passed on August 3, 1854, Congress laid out a monthly Pony Express mail route from Neosho to Albuquerque, New Mexico, authorizing an annual budget of $17,000. After the Mexican–American War and the acquisition by the US of the southwest territory, this region became of great commercial and military importance. But the Pony Express route was not a commercial success. In March of the following year, the route was changed to run from Independence to Stockton, California, via Albuquerque.

=== Civil War: 1861−1865 ===
During the Civil War, the county was occupied alternately by the opposing forces. Several engagements were fought in and around Neosho, Newtonia, and Granby, at some places more than once. In addition, frequent skirmishes took place between small units and raids by area bandits. The schools were closed during the war, and most of the schoolhouses destroyed. The new courthouse was occupied by troops of both armies during the war and finally destroyed c. 1863. After the war, the county records were found intact in a cell in the jail. R.W. Ellis, the county clerk, had concealed them there before he left to join the Confederate Army in 1861.

On July 3, 1861, the Union force of Col. Franz Sigel moved from Neosho to find and trap Gov Jackson's Missouri State Guard force, reported to be somewhere near Lamar, Missouri. Sigel believed that another Union force should be chasing them from their Union victory at Boonville on June 17. Col. Sigel knew that Sterling Price and another Confederate Army were south of his position, so he garrisoned Neosho. Captain Conrad and his Rifle Company B of the 3rd Missouri Infantry, numbering about 80 men, were selected.

When Brigadier General Benjamin McCulloch agreed to General Price's request for assistance with the Missouri State Guard, he moved north. Hearing of the Union force at Neosho, they sent four companies of the 1st Arkansas Mounted Rifles and Cpt. Carroll's Company of Arkansas State troops to capture them. On July 5, the garrison sent forces north to Carthage to ascertain the situation, as the Battle of Carthage was ongoing. Col. McIntosh ordered a two-pronged advance to Neosho, but the western force found its route longer than expected. McIntosh ordered the surrender of the company of Union troops as his Mounted Infantry companies came within two hundred yards of the court house, where the Union force was stationed. With no pickets to the south and a force to the west of town, the Confederates accepted unconditional surrender just as the second force arrived on scene. Captain Conrad's men were paroled on July 8 and were escorted the first four miles to protect them from numerous threats against their lives made by Neosho locals. The Union troops marched unarmed to Springfield, making 85 miles in 50 hours.

On October 21, Missouri Governor Claiborne Jackson and the pro-Southern members of the Missouri General Assembly, who had been forced to flee from Jefferson City when the Union Army approached, held their next to last legislative session at Neosho. On October 28, 1861, they established a provisional capital in Neosho.

Governor Jackson and the Missouri General Assembly met in the Masonic Hall, numbering thirty-nine members of the House and ten of the Senate. They passed an ordinance of secession and the event was celebrated with cannon firing by General Sterling Price's State Guardsmen who were camped in the adjacent hills. The Confederate States government accepted the results of the vote, and Missouri was admitted as the 12th state of the Confederacy. However, the pro-Union members of the General Assembly had already convened, and supported by the occupying Union troops, had declared Jackson removed from office, as well as all who favored the South. The pro-Union members then set up a their own provisional government and appointed Hamilton R. Gamble to be governor. Missouri would have three governors during the course of the Civil War, one elected by the people (Jackson) and two appointed by the pro-Union government (Gamble and William Preble Hall).

General Price made an effort to organize a Confederate defense of Missouri and initially succeeded, but any chance for concerted pro-Southern action ended when he was defeated in March 1862 at Pea Ridge.

During 1862, various engagements between the hostile forces occurred in the vicinity of Neosho. In 1863, Neosho was garrisoned by Union troops, part of the time with American Indian soldiers occupying the courthouse. On October 4, 1863, a portion of the town was burned by Confederate General Joseph Shelby, who appeared with 1,100 men and, after shelling the courthouse, received the surrender of Union Captain McAfee and his 200 men. Confederate casualties in the fight were seven dead and 22 wounded.

No court was held from May 22, 1861, until after the war, when on June 19, 1865, when Tipton O. Wood, Frederick Gallimore, and James R. Pearson sat as a county court with W.I.I. Morrow as clerk and Harvey Conly as sheriff; all were temporarily commissioned by the Governor. In 1866, elections were finally held and order was established. In 1866 a board of education was organized, consisting of Lyman Beebe, J.H. Price Sr., R.V. Keller, E.H. Benham, Hubbard F. Jones and Edwin Ebert. A school site was purchased and the existing building repaired. In 1867, a small two-story building was erected for courthouse purposes and the county officers were provided for there and in private buildings until 1878, when a substantial stone and brick building was completed at a cost of $16,250. In 1887, a jail was built. The first circuit court session was held at the house of Judge John Reed on July 22, 1839, Judge Foster P. Wright presiding.

Debate flourishes to this day regarding the legitimacy of these actions, or for that matter those of the Union men who deposed him from office. Claiborne Jackson continued to serve as governor in the Confederate-held portions of the state. But by the end of 1861, Union forces would occupy almost all of Missouri. Jackson took refuge in Arkansas, dying in Little Rock the following year of cancer. A Union victory at the Battle of Pea Ridge in northwest Arkansas in early 1862 sealed Missouri's fate as a Union border state.

=== Reconstruction: 1866−1899 ===
Following the Civil War, Neosho became a prominent commercial center of southwest Missouri during the late 19th century. The population of the small community grew in size from approximately 500 to 2,725 between 1870 and 1900. During these decades dozens of brick commercial buildings were built around the central courthouse square containing a wide variety of private businesses including lumber yards, livery stables, general stores, and hotels. In addition to retail shops and stores the city also boasted numerous manufacturing companies such as wagon factories, mills, and even a cigar factory. A new brick courthouse was constructed in 1878 followed by a county jail in 1888.

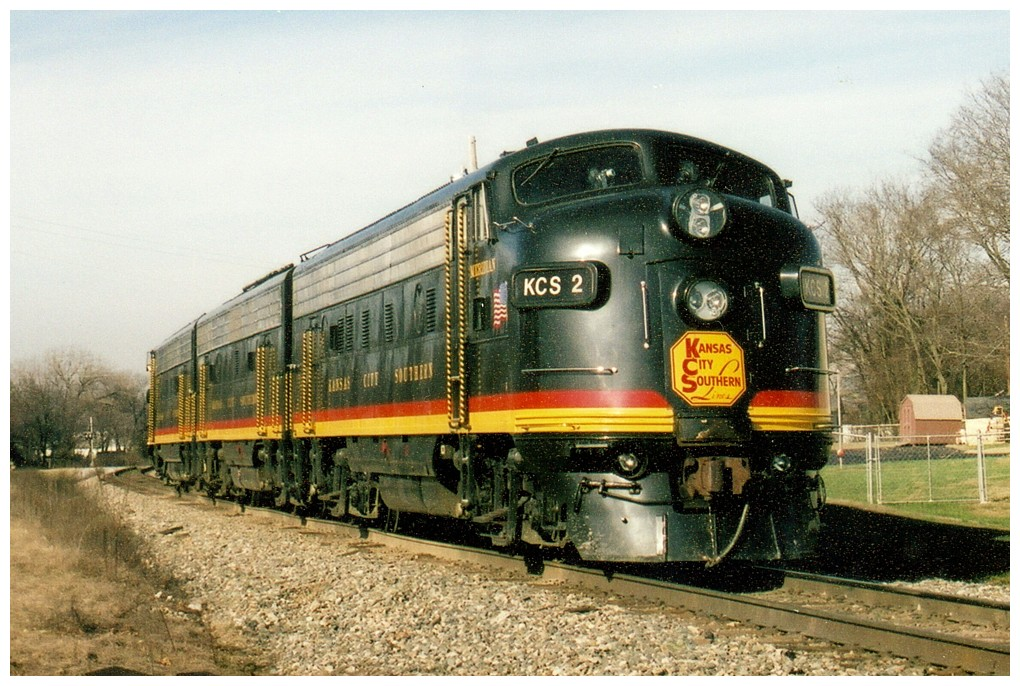
The Southern Belle offered passenger service to Neosho until 1969.

The Atlantic and Pacific Railroad reached Neosho in 1870. The A& P eventually became the San Francisco and St Louis railroad. In 1878, Neosho was incorporated and the first permanent courthouse was constructed in the center of the town square. In 1887 the Kansas City-Fort Smith and Southern Railroad entered Neosho. The KCFS& S served the Neosho National Fish Hatchery, the oldest Federal Fish Hatchery still operating today, which was built the following year. This railroad was eventually sold to the Kansas City Southern Railroad which still operates and runs through Neosho today.

In the 1882, after the vineyards of France, Spain, and Portugal were struck by the deadly phylloxera louse, it was determined that grapes bred by Neosho winemaker Hermann Jaeger were resistant to the louse. His work proved to be a savior for the great vineyards of Europe. Working with other scholars and grape growers, Jaeger supplied cuttings from his Monark Springs vineyards to help replant those lost in Europe. For his contribution to the grape and wine industries of France, Jaeger was awarded the coveted French Legion of Honour, the highest award that that nation can bestow on a civilian.

By 1898, there were 101 schools in Newton County with 139 teachers and 7,618 pupils. The permanent school fund was $23,260.28. The population of the county in 1900 was 28,001. By the start of the 20th century the city Neosho was a thriving community connected by three rail lines and exporting a variety of products and agricultural produce. The courthouse square continued as Neosho's commercial and governmental center well into the 20th century. Numerous commercial buildings were constructed from 1900 to 1930 including the four-story Haas Building on the north side of the square. The Missouri and North Arkansas Railroad ran from the Arkansas resort town of Eureka Springs to Neosho where it connected with the Frisco and Kansas City Southern tracks in 1908.

=== 20th century ===
On August 5, 1914, there was a head-on train collision between a gasoline powered motorcar (a single light rail passenger streetcar styled vehicle) of the Missouri and North Arkansas Railroad (MN&A) motorcar #103 and a northbound Kansas City Southern steam -powered locomotive #805, pulling a passenger train, near Tipton Ford, a few miles north of Neosho. The MN&A light rail motorcar was carrying about 105 gallons of gasoline at the time, 43 passengers died, many burned beyond recognition, several others were injured, and the motorcar was entirely demolished. Two days later the city held a funeral on the Newton County courthouse lawn for more than 30 unidentified individuals, who were buried in a mass grave in the Neosho I.O.O.F. cemetery.

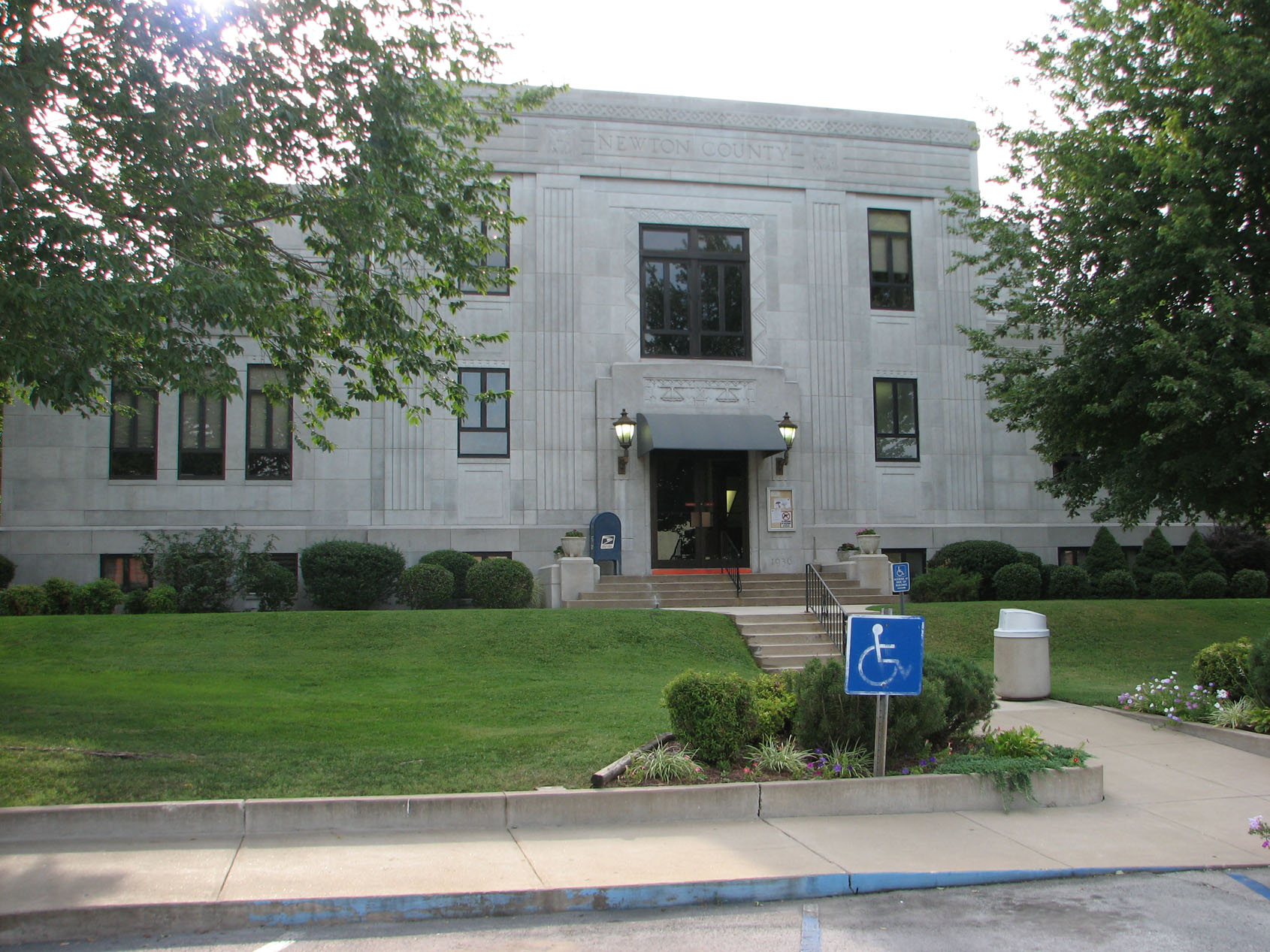
Newton County's Art Deco-style courthouse, built in 1936

During the Great Depression, the federal government assisted financially in the construction of the Neosho City Hall and Municipal Auditorium, as well as the current Newton County Courthouse. Funded by the Works Progress Administration, the existing 1870s-era brick courthouse was razed in December 1935 to make way for the current Carthage stone, Art Deco-style courthouse, which was designed by St. Louis architect Neal C. Davis, a Newton County native. Construction of the new courthouse began in April 1936 and was dedicated by Missouri U.S. senator Harry Truman later in July of that year. In 1938, another Davis-designed, WPA-funded project, the Auditorium and City Hall, was completed. This building was extensively restored and modernized in a multi-million dollar project completed in September 2008.

==== World War II ====
In the run up to World War II, Neosho was selected as the location for major U.S. Army training post to be designated as Camp Crowder in 1941. Named for General Enoch Crowder, a Missouri native instrumental in developing the draft for World War I and the Selective Service. The post was located south of town along the Kansas City Southern railroad. By 1943 the Army had acquired 42,786.41 acres (173.1505 km^{2}) in Newton and McDonald counties. Originally intended to serve as an armored training center until interestate natural gas pipleline passing through the site compelled its redesignation as a U.S. Army Signal Corps training center and infantry replacement center. Later in the war, it had a small German prisoner-of-war detention facility.

Some of the soldiers stationed at Camp Crowder included Carl Reiner, Dick Van Dyke, Mort Walker, Tillman Franks, and Jean Shepherd. Writers for the 1960s-era The Dick Van Dyke Show, made the post the setting where Rob and Laura Petrie, portrayed by actors Dick Van Dyke and Mary Tyler Moore, met; Rob was a sergeant in Special Services and Laura was a USO dancer. The camp was well known to its residents for being muddy and swampy during the rainy season. The cartoonist Mort Walker, who was stationed there, later used it for his fictional "Camp Swampy" in his long-running newspaper comic strip, Beetle Bailey.

Camp Crowder was deactivated in 1951. While the core of the post was retained, many of the temporary barracks were declared surplus and sold. One of the post's movie theatres was disassembled and reassembled on the campus of what is today the University of Missouri – Kansas City. It served as the Kansas City Playhouse until being torn down for a new theatre. A portion of its wall, which contains statues of Comedy and Tragedy, is a landmark on the university campus.

Fort Crowder In the early 1950s, local congressman Dewey Jackson Short, senior member of the House Armed Services Committee, secured authorization and some funding to build two permanent barracks and a disciplinary barracks to reactivate the former Camp Crowder as a permanent installation, Fort Crowder. Its mission was to be the Army's military police training school. After Short's defeat in the 1956 election, the fort was deactivated.

Neosho obtained the permanent barracks as surplus and adapted them as the core of the community college campus for Crowder College.

About 2,000 acres (8.1 km2) of the post was turned over to the U. S. Air Force, which constructed Plant 65. The rocket engine manufacturing facility was operated by contract to North American Aviation, later known as Rocketdyne. This facility became Rocketdyne's primary manufacturing and testing complex for the H-1 rocket engine, used by the Saturn I and Saturn IB rockets. These rockets were used in NASA's Apollo, Skylab, and Apollo–Soyuz Test Project programs until its contract ended in 1968.[2]

==== The Flower Box City ====
Since 1957, Neosho has been locally well known as "The Flower Box City"; that year, it earned the All-America City Award for its beautification efforts. In 1955, the town had received a $5,000 grant from The New York Community Trust for that purpose. Local companies provided lumber at cost, and the Jaycees formed an assembly line to build more than 200 wooden flower boxes. Pet Milk Company donated 400 used wooden barrels for container gardens, and town nurseries supplied plants at reduced rates. The city dressed up trash cans and parking meters around the courthouse square with flower baskets. In 1957, Neosho earned a coveted All-America City Award from Look magazine and the National Municipal League. (The Life magazine photojournalist Wallace Kirkland covered the 1957 city for the magazine. The Life Magazine collection of his photographs from this assignment, many previously unpublished, can be found in the Life photo archive, hosted by Google). Since then, the Flower Box Promotion Committee has supported beautification and awarded 'Beauty Spot' prizes each spring and summer to homes and businesses with outstanding yards, flower gardens, and flower boxes.

==== Fort Crowder ====
In the early 1950s, local congressman Dewey Jackson Short, senior member of the House Armed Services Committee, secured authorization and some funding to build two permanent barracks and a disciplinary barracks to reactivate the former Camp Crowder as a permanent installation, Fort Crowder. Its mission was to be the Army's military police training school. After Short's defeat in the 1956 election, the fort was deactivated.

About 2,000 acres (8.1 km^{2}) of the post was turned over to the U. S. Air Force, which constructed Plant 65. The rocket engine manufacturing facility was operated by contract to North American Aviation, later known as Rocketdyne. This facility became Rocketdyne's primary manufacturing and testing complex for the H-1 rocket engine, used by the Saturn I and Saturn IB rockets. These rockets were used in NASA's Apollo, Skylab, and Apollo–Soyuz Test Project programs until its contract ended in 1968.

On April 24, 1975, a major tornado caused massive destruction and killed three people. It destroyed a motel, apartment complex, and mobile home park, along with dozens of homes and businesses.

=== 21st century ===
Today, Neosho is enjoying a renaissance, particularly in the historic downtown area. Through a combination of private investment and public resources, numerous restoration and revitalization projects have been undertaken in the historic city center to restore its architectural quality, upgrade the infrastructure, and improve the quality of life of downtown.

=== Other noteworthy events ===
- 1870 – the Atlantic and Pacific Railroad reaches Neosho.
- 1878 – First county courthouse is built in the center of the downtown square. Neosho is incorporated.
- 1887 – The Kansas City, Fort Smith and Southern Railroad, later to become the Kansas City Southern, reaches Neosho.
- 1888 – Neosho National Fish Hatchery is built, and telephone service comes to town.
- 1892 – E. R. Matters establishes his jewelry store. Today it is one of the oldest family-owned businesses in the state.
- 1938 – Scenes from the 1939 film Jesse James, starring Tyrone Power and Henry Fonda are filmed at the Kansas City Southern railroad depot, with many locals serving as extras.
- 1939 – Neosho celebrates its centennial with the creation of the Centennial Mural by Duard Marshall.
- 1966 – The landmark Big Spring Inn burns to the ground.
- 1978 – Neosho is named recipient of the All-Missouri Certified City Award.
- 2006 – Neosho is announced as one of ten cities selected as first annual inductees into Missouri Governor Matt Blunt's DREAM Initiative, a state-funded downtown revitalization and economic assistance program. Other 2006 cities were Cape Girardeau, Excelsior Springs, Hannibal, Hermann, Kennett, Sedalia, St. Joseph, Washington, and West Plains.
- 2007 – 52-year-old Eiken Elam Saimon opens fire at the First Congregational Church, killing three people and injuring four others. After a brief hostage situation, Saimon is arrested.
- 2015 – Historic flooding rocked Newton County and the surrounding areas, with creek levels a full seven feet above previous records.
- 2017 – Massive flood in Neosho, submerging vehicles and causing water damage in homes not normally affected by floods.

== Geography ==
Neosho is in south central Newton County approximately 15 miles south-southeast of Joplin. It is at the intersection of US routes 60 and 71.

According to the United States Census Bureau, the city has a total area of 15.75 square miles (40.79 km^{2}), of which 15.73 square miles (40.74 km^{2}) is land and 0.02 square miles (0.05 km^{2}) is water.

Neosho is noted for numerous springs including:

=== Big Spring ===
Also known historically as Clark Spring, Big Spring is Neosho's largest spring and is located near the historic downtown in the city's main park, Big Spring Park. This spring issues at the base of a high bluff of Mississippian limestone from a series of cavernous openings developed along a bedding plane, and flows through the city park.

=== Bell's Iron Spring ===
Also known as historically as Walbridge Spring, located 900 feet (270 m) east of the Big Spring and a block east of the courthouse square, Bell's Iron Spring played an important role in Neosho's development. Originally rising in the valley and capable of supplying a city of 50,000 people, though hidden from view for many years, this spring is currently the focus of an ongoing restoration project, which includes plans to re-expose the spring and redevelop the surrounding property as a public historic park. Due to the recent discovery of the presence of endangered Ozark cave fish in the spring, the city is working closely with Missouri Department of Conservation and the U.S. Fish and Wildlife Service.

=== Hatchery springs ===
Hearrell, McMahon, Bartholic, and Elm Springs supply water to the Neosho National Fish Hatchery. In 1888, Hearrell Spring, named after Lemuel B Hearrell, began supplying water to the newly built hatchery. In 1908, McMahon Spring was added to supply the hatchery's fish rearing ponds, after its condemnation under the governmental power of eminent domain. In 1964, after the closing of nearby Fort Crowder, additional water was supplied by Elm Spring and Bartholic Spring. With Hearrell Spring producing nearly the same volume of water as Big Spring, the combined flow of these four springs is about 2,000,000 gallons per day as it arrives at the hatchery. While Hearrell Spring arises at the hatchery, water from the other springs is piped several miles by pipeline from their origins to the hatchery.

=== Other springs ===
- Bethesda Spring – in the northeast section. Historically notable for its purported healing properties.
- Birch Spring – a strong spring just south of the Bethesda Spring.
- Brock's Spring – on the eastern line of Neosho.
- Carter & Clark Springs – in the northern part of town. Considered by early residents to have medicinal qualities.
- Hobo Spring – also known as Williams Spring, west of downtown.
- McElhany Springs – forming a bold stream of freestone water in the western part of the town.
- Mertin Springs – three springs north of the Bethesda spring which rush from beneath a cliff.
- Morse Spring
- Sevier's Springs – two soft water springs just south of Brock's Spring.

=== Climate ===
Neosho lies near the geographic center of the contiguous United States, in an area with a high concentration of freshwater streams and lakes. This makes for a humid subtropical (Köppen climate classification: Cfa) with moderate precipitation and extremes of hot and cold. Summers can be very humid, with moist air riding up from the Gulf of Mexico, and during July and August daytime highs can reach into the triple digits. Winters vary from mild days to bitterly cold, with lows reaching into the teens below zero a few times a year.

Neosho is situated in "Tornado Alley", a broad region where cold air from the Rocky Mountains and Canada collides with warm air from the Gulf of Mexico, leading to the formation of powerful storms. Neosho has had many severe outbreaks of tornadoes, including an EF4 tornado hit the Neosho area on May 10, 2008, and traveled about 80 miles (130 km) in two states, as well as a major tornado that caused massive destruction on April 24, 1975, which resulted in three killed and many injured. The region is also prone to ice storms, such as the 2007 ice storm during which hundreds of thousands lost power for days and (in some cases) weeks. The White House declared 34 counties in Missouri disaster areas. Damage in Missouri totaled $352.9 million (2007 USD).

Climate data for Neosho, Missouri (1991–2020 normals, extremes 1893–present)
| Month | Jan | Feb | Mar | Apr | May | Jun | Jul | Aug | Sep | Oct | Nov | Dec | Year |
|---|---|---|---|---|---|---|---|---|---|---|---|---|---|
| Record high °F (°C) | 78 (26) | 87 (31) | 93 (34) | 95 (35) | 97 (36) | 105 (41) | 112 (44) | 109 (43) | 105 (41) | 95 (35) | 86 (30) | 80 (27) | 112 (44) |
| Mean maximum °F (°C) | 68.1 (20.1) | 71.9 (22.2) | 79.5 (26.4) | 84.5 (29.2) | 87.7 (30.9) | 91.8 (33.2) | 96.4 (35.8) | 97.8 (36.6) | 92.4 (33.6) | 84.9 (29.4) | 76.5 (24.7) | 69.2 (20.7) | 98.6 (37.0) |
| Mean daily maximum °F (°C) | 46.3 (7.9) | 50.9 (10.5) | 60.0 (15.6) | 69.7 (20.9) | 77.2 (25.1) | 85.2 (29.6) | 89.8 (32.1) | 89.4 (31.9) | 82.2 (27.9) | 71.5 (21.9) | 59.5 (15.3) | 49.4 (9.7) | 69.3 (20.7) |
| Daily mean °F (°C) | 35.8 (2.1) | 40.0 (4.4) | 49.0 (9.4) | 58.4 (14.7) | 67.1 (19.5) | 75.7 (24.3) | 80.1 (26.7) | 78.9 (26.1) | 70.9 (21.6) | 59.7 (15.4) | 48.6 (9.2) | 39.2 (4.0) | 58.6 (14.8) |
| Mean daily minimum °F (°C) | 25.3 (−3.7) | 29.0 (−1.7) | 38.0 (3.3) | 47.0 (8.3) | 57.0 (13.9) | 66.2 (19.0) | 70.4 (21.3) | 68.3 (20.2) | 59.7 (15.4) | 47.8 (8.8) | 37.8 (3.2) | 29.0 (−1.7) | 48.0 (8.9) |
| Mean minimum °F (°C) | 4.5 (−15.3) | 8.8 (−12.9) | 17.2 (−8.2) | 27.9 (−2.3) | 38.2 (3.4) | 50.9 (10.5) | 57.7 (14.3) | 54.4 (12.4) | 42.2 (5.7) | 29.2 (−1.6) | 18.6 (−7.4) | 9.8 (−12.3) | −0.2 (−17.9) |
| Record low °F (°C) | −31 (−35) | −30 (−34) | −11 (−24) | 6 (−14) | 25 (−4) | 38 (3) | 44 (7) | 40 (4) | 27 (−3) | 14 (−10) | 4 (−16) | −23 (−31) | −31 (−35) |
| Average precipitation inches (mm) | 2.55 (65) | 2.41 (61) | 3.70 (94) | 5.31 (135) | 6.74 (171) | 5.70 (145) | 4.20 (107) | 3.65 (93) | 4.99 (127) | 4.14 (105) | 3.70 (94) | 2.87 (73) | 49.96 (1,269) |
| Average snowfall inches (cm) | 2.8 (7.1) | 0.9 (2.3) | 2.0 (5.1) | 0.0 (0.0) | 0.0 (0.0) | 0.0 (0.0) | 0.0 (0.0) | 0.0 (0.0) | 0.0 (0.0) | 0.0 (0.0) | 0.1 (0.25) | 2.3 (5.8) | 8.1 (21) |
| Average precipitation days (≥ 0.01 in) | 5.9 | 5.6 | 7.9 | 8.5 | 10.5 | 8.5 | 6.8 | 6.2 | 6.9 | 7.2 | 6.7 | 5.6 | 86.3 |
| Average snowy days (≥ 0.1 in) | 1.0 | 0.7 | 0.4 | 0.0 | 0.0 | 0.0 | 0.0 | 0.0 | 0.0 | 0.0 | 0.1 | 0.7 | 2.9 |
Source: NOAA

== Demographics ==
Historical population
| Census | Pop. | Note | %± |
|---|---|---|---|
| 1850 | 221 | | — |
| 1860 | 571 | | 158.4% |
| 1870 | 875 | | 53.2% |
| 1880 | 1,631 | | 86.4% |
| 1890 | 2,198 | | 34.8% |
| 1900 | 2,725 | | 24.0% |
| 1910 | 3,661 | | 34.3% |
| 1920 | 3,968 | | 8.4% |
| 1930 | 4,485 | | 13.0% |
| 1940 | 5,318 | | 18.6% |
| 1950 | 5,790 | | 8.9% |
| 1960 | 7,452 | | 28.7% |
| 1970 | 7,517 | | 0.9% |
| 1980 | 9,493 | | 26.3% |
| 1990 | 9,254 | | −2.5% |
| 2000 | 10,505 | | 13.5% |
| 2010 | 11,835 | | 12.7% |
| 2020 | 12,590 | | 6.4% |
| 2025 (est.) | 14,078 | | 11.8% |
U.S. Decennial Census

=== 2020 census ===
As of the 2020 census, Neosho had a population of 12,590, with 4,631 households and 2,769 families. The population density was 799.4 per square mile (308.6/km^{2}). The median age was 33.9 years; 26.9% of residents were under the age of 18 and 15.8% were 65 years of age or older. For every 100 females, there were 93.9 males, and for every 100 females age 18 and over, there were 90.3 males.

95.4% of residents lived in urban areas, while 4.6% lived in rural areas.

Of households in Neosho, 35.2% had children under the age of 18 living in them. Of all households, 44.3% were married-couple households, 17.0% were households with a male householder and no spouse or partner present, and 30.7% were households with a female householder and no spouse or partner present. About 30.0% of all households were made up of individuals, and 13.7% had someone living alone who was 65 years of age or older. The average household size was 2.6 and the average family size was 3.3.

There were 5,161 housing units, of which 10.3% were vacant. The homeowner vacancy rate was 2.5% and the rental vacancy rate was 9.6%.

Racial composition as of the 2020 census
| Race | Number | Percent |
|---|---|---|
| White | 9,186 | 73.0% |
| Black or African American | 119 | 0.9% |
| American Indian and Alaska Native | 270 | 2.1% |
| Asian | 72 | 0.6% |
| Native Hawaiian and Other Pacific Islander | 585 | 4.6% |
| Some other race | 1,199 | 9.5% |
| Two or more races | 1,159 | 9.2% |
| Hispanic or Latino (of any race) | 1,848 | 14.7% |

=== Income and poverty ===
The 2016–2020 5-year American Community Survey estimates show that the median household income was $43,925 (with a margin of error of +/- $6,725) and the median family income was $53,570 (+/- $4,887). Males had a median income of $30,938 (+/- $1,846) versus $21,290 (+/- $3,938) for females. The median income for those above 16 years old was $27,421 (+/- $2,612). Approximately, 14.2% of families and 21.5% of the population were below the poverty line, including 25.9% of those under the age of 18 and 7.8% of those ages 65 or over.

=== 2010 census ===
As of the census of 2010, there were 11,835 people, 4,457 households, and 2,962 families residing in the city. The population density was 752.4 inhabitants per square mile (290.5/km^{2}). There were 4,998 housing units at an average density of 317.7 per square mile (122.7/km^{2}). The racial makeup of the city was 84.2% White, 1.0% African American, 1.6% Native American, 0.9% Asian, 2.4% Pacific Islander, 7.2% from other races, and 2.7% from two or more races. Hispanic or Latino of any race were 11.3% of the population.

There were 4,457 households, of which 36.8% had children under the age of 18 living with them, 47.8% were married couples living together, 13.7% had a female householder with no husband present, 5.0% had a male householder with no wife present, and 33.5% were non-families. 28.3% of all households were made up of individuals, and 12.7% had someone living alone who was 65 years of age or older. The average household size was 2.55 and the average family size was 3.12.

The median age in the city was 32.7 years. 27.1% of residents were under the age of 18; 11.8% were between the ages of 18 and 24; 25.5% were from 25 to 44; 21.4% were from 45 to 64; and 14.2% were 65 years of age or older. The gender makeup of the city was 48.3% male and 51.7% female.

=== 2000 census ===
As of the census of 2000, there were 10,505 people, 4,136 households, and 2,725 families residing in the city. The population density was 703.6 inhabitants per square mile (271.7/km^{2}). There were 4,510 housing units at an average density of 302.0 per square mile (116.6/km^{2}). The racial makeup of the city was 90.99% White, 1.04% African American, 1.61% Native American, 0.39% Asian, 1.00% Pacific Islander, 2.73% from other races, and 2.24% from two or more races. Hispanic or Latino of any race were 4.23% of the population.

There were 4,136 households, out of which 31.8% had children under the age of 18 living with them, 50.5% were married couples living together, 11.9% had a female householder with no husband present, and 34.1% were non-families. 29.6% of all households were made up of individuals, and 14.5% had someone living alone who was 65 years of age or older. The average household size was 2.44 and the average family size was 3.01.

In the city, the population was spread out, with 26.2% under the age of 18, 10.8% from 18 to 24, 26.1% from 25 to 44, 19.8% from 45 to 64, and 17.1% who were 65 years of age or older. The median age was 35 years. For every 100 females, there were 89.3 males. For every 100 females age 18 and over, there were 84.1 males.

The median income for a household in the city was $31,225, and the median income for a family was $37,790. Males had a median income of $27,672 versus $20,632 for females. The per capita income for the city was $15,847. About 8.7% of families and 12.8% of the population were below the poverty line, including 14.3% of those under age 18 and 9.4% of those age 65 or over.

== Cityscape ==
=== Cultural institutions ===
- Newton County Historical Society Museum
- Longwell Museum
- Thomas Hart Benton Collection
- Neosho National Fish Hatchery – oldest operating Federal Fish Hatchery
- Big Spring Park
- Morse Park
- Bicentennial Park

=== Historic district ===
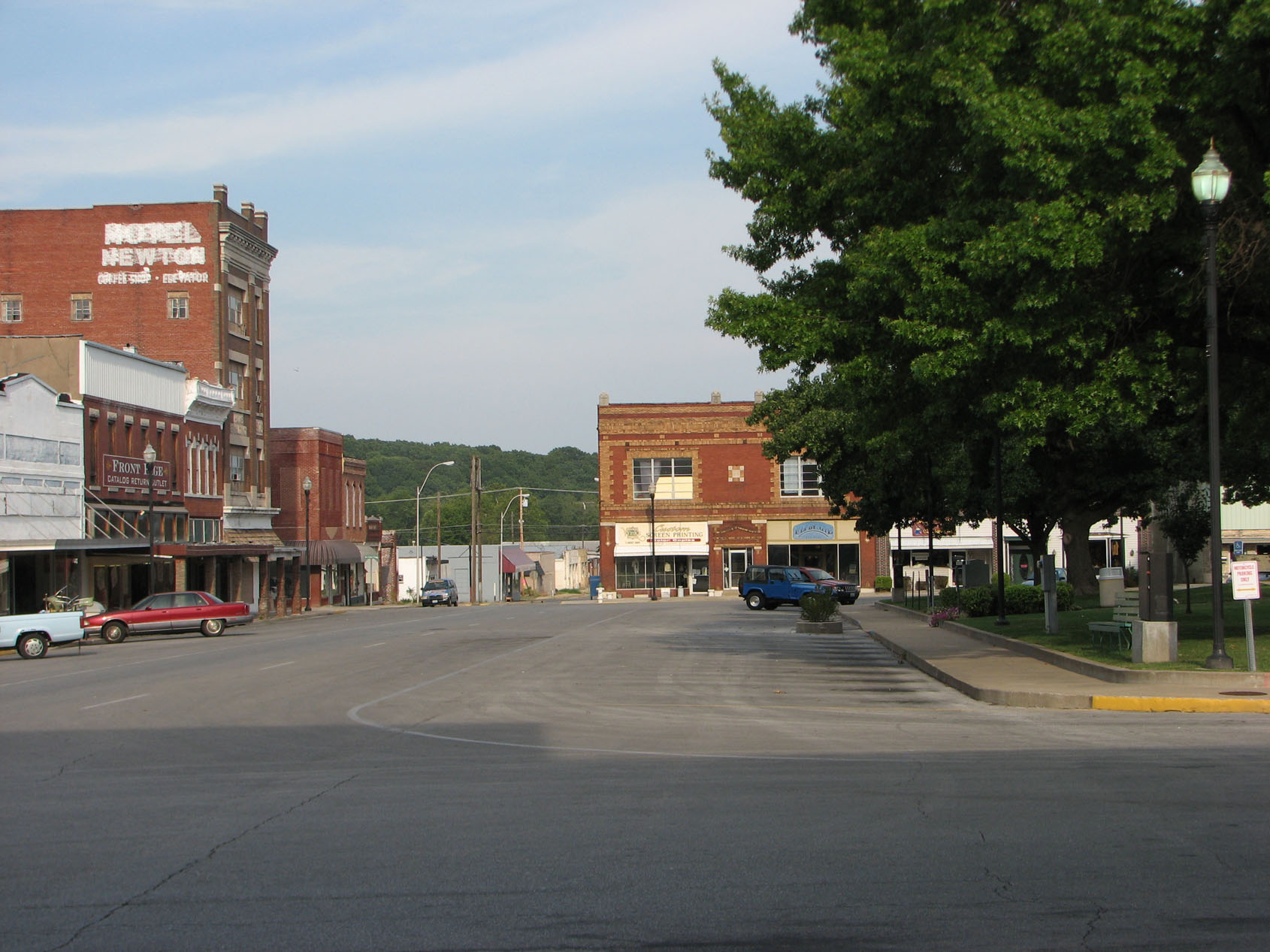
View of Neosho's town square. The building directly opposite was the site of the provisional Confederate state capitol building.

A large portion of downtown Neosho, described as the Neosho Commercial Historic District, is listed in the National Register of Historic Places. It includes as a non-contributing building the former McGinty's Department Store building. Also listed in the register are the Second Baptist Church, located several blocks north of downtown and built in the Victorian Gothic style of 1896, and the Neosho High School and Neosho Wholesale Grocery Company. Since 2001, private and public parties have combined efforts to revitalize downtown Neosho. They have restored and renovated portions of the historic district, including installation of new street lights and sidewalks, and renovation of storefronts. and new sidewalks.

== Culture ==
=== Entertainment and performing arts ===
- Neosho Civic Center (also known as "The Civic", formerly the Neosho Municipal Auditorium)

=== Legends and folklore ===
Local legend has it that Confederate gold is buried within the town, and that a cave holds the remains of the soldiers as well as the gold. Interest in this legend increased in 2002, when Jim Cole, the former city manager and director of public works, announced that he believed he found this missing cave.

Another part of the legend of the cave is that two brothers, J.W. Abbott and E.M. Abbott, were lost while exploring the cave in the early 20th century, and thus the cave was later closed. The Abbott brothers created the Big Spring Park Fund, and a dedication plaque now stands near Big Spring Cave in their memory.

== Economy ==
=== Industry ===
- BASF
- La-Z-Boy Incorporated – Recliner and sofa assembly plant
- Premier Turbines – Aircraft engine repair and overhaul facility – formerly Rocketdyne
- Newell Brands - formerly Jarden Corporation – formerly Sunbeam Inc.
- Leggett & Platt-Formed Wire Division – Diversified wire products manufacturer – formerly Talbot Industries

== Government ==
Neosho's municipal organization provided for under the city charter is a home rule council-manager government.

== Education ==
=== Public schools ===
- Neosho School District: Current board members are Brett Day, Jonathan Russell, Steven Douglas, Kim Wood, Phil Wise, Keri Collinsworth, and Stuart Puckett.
- Crowder College. Crowder College has been deeply involved in alternative energy research since the early 1980s; in 1984, it built the first solar-powered vehicle to successfully complete a coast-to-coast journey across the United States. In 2009, the college began construction on the MARET (Missouri Alternative & Renewable Energy Technology) Center, a facility to encourage the development of experimental programs and alternative energy systems.

=== Private schools ===
- Neosho Beauty College
- Neosho Christian Schools (K-12)
- Ozark Bible Institute and College https://www.obi.college/ (B.B.L., B.B.S., B.C.E.)
- Ozark Christian Academy (Pre K-12)
- Trinity Learning Center

=== Public library ===
Neosho has a lending library, the Neosho Newton County Library.

== Media ==
=== Radio ===
- KBTN, 1420 AM – country, news
- KNEO, 91.7 FM – Christian

=== Newspapers ===
- Neosho Daily News
- The News-Dispatch

== Transportation ==
=== Highways ===
- Interstate 49 South to Northwest Arkansas, North to Joplin, & Kansas City, Missouri
- US 60 (which runs from Brenda, Arizona to Virginia Beach, Virginia). East to Monett, Missouri, West to Vinita, Oklahoma
- Jefferson Lines (Intercity Bus)

=== Rail ===
Neosho was on the main line of the St. Louis–San Francisco Railway between St. Louis and Oklahoma City. It also was a stop on the defunct Missouri and North Arkansas Railroad, which provided passenger and freight service from Joplin, Missouri, to Helena in Phillips County in eastern Arkansas, from 1906 until its disestablishment in 1946.

- St. Louis-San Francisco Railway
- Kansas City Southern Railway
- BNSF Railway

=== Air ===
Neosho is home to the Hugh Robinson Airport.

== Sister city ==
- Pohnpei, Micronesia

== Notable people ==
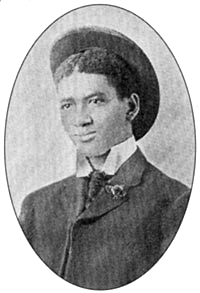
James Scott – ragtime composer and Neosho native

- Thomas Hart Benton (1889–1975) – painter and Regionalist muralist.
- Maecenas E. Benton (1848–1924) - U.S. House Representative from Missouri's 15th District, Father of Thomas Hart Benton.
- James Bishop (1927–2021) – Modernist painter.
- Scott Berry (1962- ) – Southern Miss head baseball coach.
- George Washington Carver (1864–1943) – African-American inventor and botanist attended school in Neosho.
- Donn Clendenon (1935–2005) – Major League Baseball first baseman
- David Edwards (1956– ) – Professional golfer in the PGA.
- Allison Garrett (1964– ) – 17th President of Emporia State University.
- Billy James Hargis (1925–2004) – Christian evangelist.
- H. Waldo Hatler (1894–1967) – World War I soldier and Medal of Honor recipient.
- Hermann Jaeger (1815–1890) – Missouri wine pioneer & French Legion of Honor recipient.
- Gavin Kelso (1990- ) - Bass player with Grand Ole Opry star and Country Music Hall of Famer Ricky Skaggs and Kentucky Thunder.
- Preston Lacy (1969- ) – comedian attended Neosho High School.
- Daniel Longwell (1899–1968) – co-founder and managing editor of Life magazine who retired to Neosho
- James Duard Marshall (1914–2010) – artist who painted the town's centennial mural in 1939.
- Travis Phelps (1977– ) – Major League Baseball pitcher.
- Charles T. Powers (1943–1996) – journalist and novelist.
- Hugh Armstrong Robinson (1881–1963) – aviation pioneer.
- Will Rogers (1879–1935) – humorist attended Willow Hassel School in Neosho.
- James Scott (1885–1938) – ragtime composer and pianist born in Neosho

== See also ==
- List of cities in Missouri
