= Jolly Mill =

- U.S. National Register of Historic Places
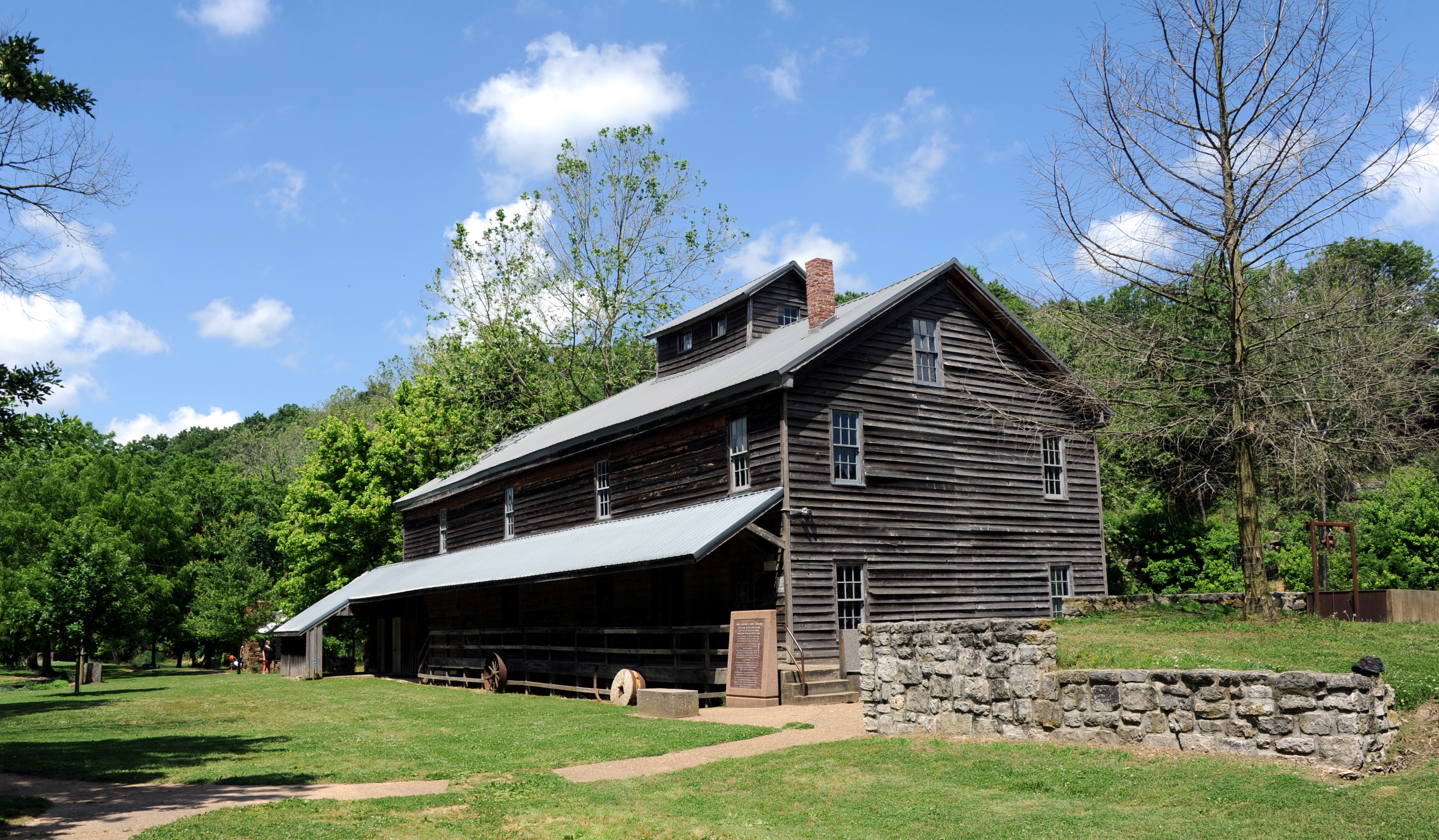

- Location within Missouri Location within the United States
- Location: Southwest of Pierce City
- Coordinates: 36°53′50″N 94°4′18″W
- Area: 1.3 acres (0.53 ha)
- Built: 1848
- NRHP reference No.: 83004021
- Added to NRHP: October 13, 1983

Jolly Mill was built on Capps Creek at Jollification, Berwick Township, Newton County, Missouri, United States in 1848 by Thomas Isbell and his son John to serve as a whiskey distillery. Jolly Mill was named for the local Jolly family. The mill also served as a grist mill, and continued to operate in that capacity until 1975. Due to the flood in late December 2015, the park was heavily damaged.

It was listed on the National Register of Historic Places in 1983.

== History ==
The success of the mill led to the establishment in the 1850s and subsequent growth of the town of Jollification, the name referring to the unnaturally jovial disposition of the people who worked in and around the distillery.

The town was burned during the Civil War, but the mill survived. The town was somewhat rebuilt. In 1870, the railroad bypassed what was left of Jollification, which ultimately led to its dissolution.

The mill was purchased in 1983 by The Friends of Jolly Mill and listed on the National Register of Historic Places.

In recent years, under the care of The Friends of Jolly Mill, the mill has undergone somewhat of a renaissance. The mill and surrounding land have been restored and converted into a park, with many period buildings moved in from other locations in an attempt to replicate the look and feel of the town of Jollification.

The mill is also a primary trout-fishing location, managed by the Missouri Department of Conservation as Capps Creek White Ribbon Trout Area. Four miles of trout stream are stocked with rainbow and brown trout periodically, and fishermen are permitted to harvest up to 4 trout per day.
