= Jones Creek (Center Creek tributary) =

Stream in the U.S. state of Missouri

Jones Creek is a stream in Jasper and Newton counties in the U.S. state of Missouri. It is a tributary of Center Creek.

The stream headwaters arise in Newton County at 36°58′44″N 94°10′41″W at an elevation of about 1260 feet. The stream flows to the northwest passing the communities of Pepsin and Parshley. It passes under I-44 and gains the tributary of Jenkins Creek. Its confluence with Center Creek is just east of U.S. Route 71 approximately three miles south of Carthage in Jasper County at 37°06′19″N 94°18′33″W at an elevation of 955 feet.

Jones Creek has the name of the local Jones family.

== See also ==
- List of rivers of Missouri
