= Capps Creek =

Capps Creek may refer to:

- Capps Creek (Current River), a stream in Missouri
- Capps Creek (Shoal Creek), a stream in Newton County, Missouri
