= Tanyard Hollow =

Valley in Missouri, United States

Coordinates: 37.04034°N 94.56189°W

Tanyard Hollow is a valley in Jasper and Newton Counties in the U.S. state of Missouri.

Tanyard Hollow was so named on account of the tannery it once contained.
