= Lost Creek (Spring River tributary) =

Stream in the U.S. state of Missouri

Lost Creek is a stream in Newton County, Missouri and Ottawa County, Oklahoma. It is a tributary to the Spring River.

The stream headwaters arise three miles west of Neosho, Missouri at 36°51′12″N 94°25′41″W at an elevation of approximately 1180 feet. The stream flows to the west-northwest and turns to the southwest as it passes south of the community of Racine. The stream continues to the southwest passing through Seneca, Missouri and enters eastern Oklahoma. The stream flows southwest parallel to U.S. Route 60. The stream enters the Spring River within the waters of the Grand Lake of the Cherokees just west of Wyandotte. The confluence was at 36°47′43″N 94°44′25″W and an elevation of 741 feet (prior to the lake creation).

The name Lost Creek was given by early settlers due to the difficulty they had locating the stream based on earlier descriptions of the stream and the area.
