= Galena =

Natural mineral form of lead sulfide

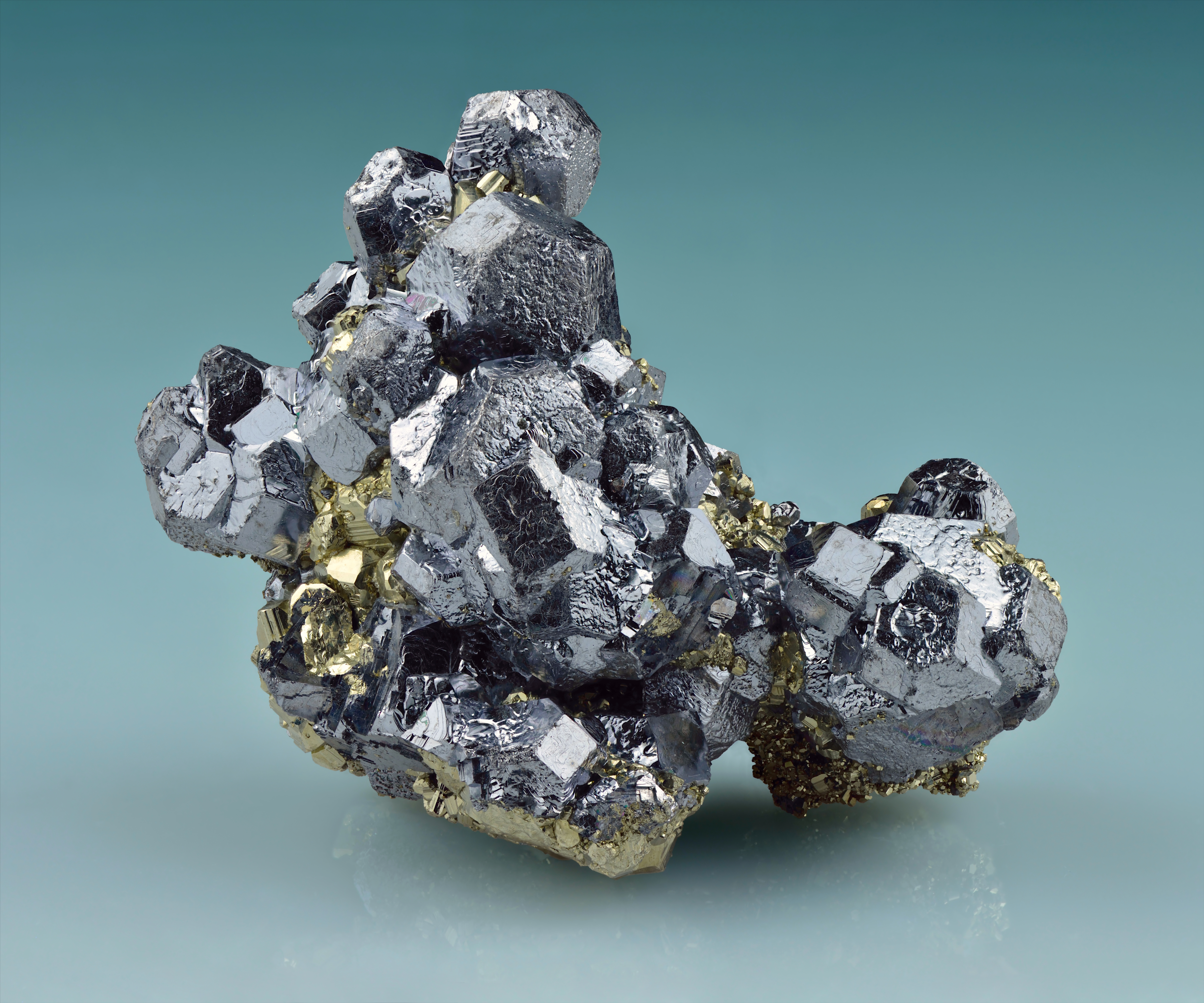
- Galena with minor pyrite

General
- Category: Sulfide mineral
- Formula: PbS
- IMA symbol: Gn
- Strunz classification: 2.CD.10
- Dana classification: 2.8.1.1
- Crystal system: Cubic
- Crystal class: Hexoctahedral (m3̅m); H–M symbol: (4/m 3̅ 2/m)
- Space group: Fm3̅m
- Unit cell: a = 5.936 Å; Z = 4

Identification
- Color: Lead gray and silvery
- Crystal habit: Cubes and octahedra, blocky, tabular and sometimes skeletal crystals
- Twinning: Contact, penetration and lamellar
- Cleavage: Cubic perfect on {001}, parting on {111}
- Fracture: Subconchoidal
- Tenacity: Brittle
- Mohs scale hardness: 2.5–2.75
- Luster: Metallic on cleavage planes
- Streak: Lead gray
- Diaphaneity: Opaque
- Specific gravity: 7.2–7.6
- Optical properties: Isotropic and opaque
- Fusibility: 2
- Other characteristics: Natural semiconductor

Galena, also called lead glance, is the natural mineral form of lead(II) sulfide (PbS). It is the most important ore of lead and an important source of silver.

Galena is one of the most abundant and widely distributed sulfide minerals. It crystallizes in the cubic crystal system often showing octahedral forms. It is often associated with the minerals sphalerite, calcite and fluorite.

As a pure specimen held in the hand, under standard temperature and pressure, galena is insoluble in water and so is almost non-toxic. Handling galena under these specific conditions (such as in a museum or as part of geology instruction) poses practically no risk; however, as lead(II) sulfide is reasonably reactive in a variety of environments, it can be highly toxic if swallowed or inhaled, particularly under prolonged or repeated exposure.

== Occurrence ==
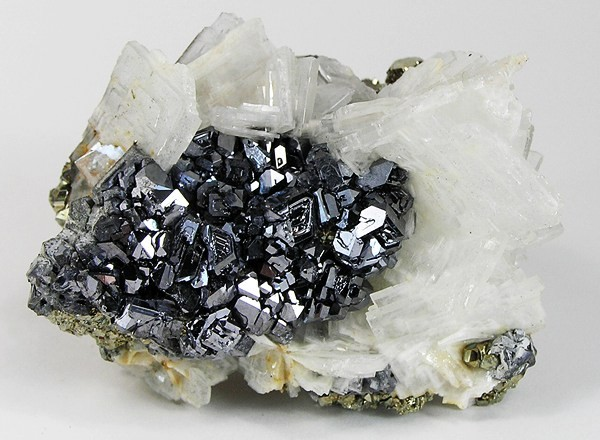
Galena with baryte and pyrite from Cerro de Pasco, Peru; 5.8 cm × 4.8 cm × 4.4 cm (2.3 in × 1.9 in × 1.7 in)

Galena is the main ore of lead, used since ancient times, since lead can be smelted from galena in an ordinary wood fire. Galena typically is found in hydrothermal veins in association with sphalerite, marcasite, chalcopyrite, cerussite, anglesite, dolomite, calcite, quartz, barite, and fluorite. It is also found in association with sphalerite in low-temperature lead-zinc deposits within limestone beds. Minor amounts are found in contact metamorphic zones, in pegmatites, and disseminated in sedimentary rock.

In some deposits, the galena contains up to 0.5% silver, a byproduct that far surpasses the main lead ore in revenue. In these deposits significant amounts of silver occur as included silver sulfide mineral phases or as limited silver in solid solution within the galena structure. These argentiferous galenas have long been an important ore of silver. Silver-bearing galena is almost entirely of hydrothermal origin; galena in lead-zinc deposits contains little silver.

Galena deposits are found worldwide in various environments. Noted deposits include those at Freiberg in Saxony; Cornwall, the Mendips in Somerset, Derbyshire, and Cumberland in England; the Linares mines in Spain were worked from before the Roman times until the end of the 20th century; the Madan and Rhodope Mountains in Bulgaria; the Sullivan Mine of British Columbia; Broken Hill and Mount Isa in Australia; and the ancient mines of Sardinia.

In the United States, it occurs most notably as lead-zinc ore in the Mississippi Valley type deposits of the Lead Belt in southeastern Missouri, which is the largest known deposit, and in the Driftless Area of Illinois, Iowa and Wisconsin, providing the origin of the name of Galena, Illinois, a historical settlement known for the material. Galena also was a major mineral of the zinc-lead mines of the tri-state district around Joplin in southwestern Missouri and the adjoining areas of Kansas and Oklahoma. Galena is also an important ore mineral in the silver mining regions of Colorado, Idaho, Utah and Montana. Of the latter, the Coeur d'Alene district of northern Idaho was most prominent.

Australia is the world's leading producer of lead as of 2021, most of which is extracted as galena. Argentiferous galena was accidentally discovered at Glen Osmond in 1841, and additional deposits were discovered near Broken Hill in 1876 and at Mount Isa in 1923. Most galena in Australia is found in hydrothermal deposits emplaced around 1680 million years ago, which have since been heavily metamorphosed.

The largest documented crystal of galena is composite cubo-octahedra from the Great Laxey Mine, Isle of Man, measuring 25 cm × 25 cm × 25 cm (10 in × 10 in × 10 in). This specimen is on permanent display in the minerals gallery of the Natural History Museum, London.

== Importance ==
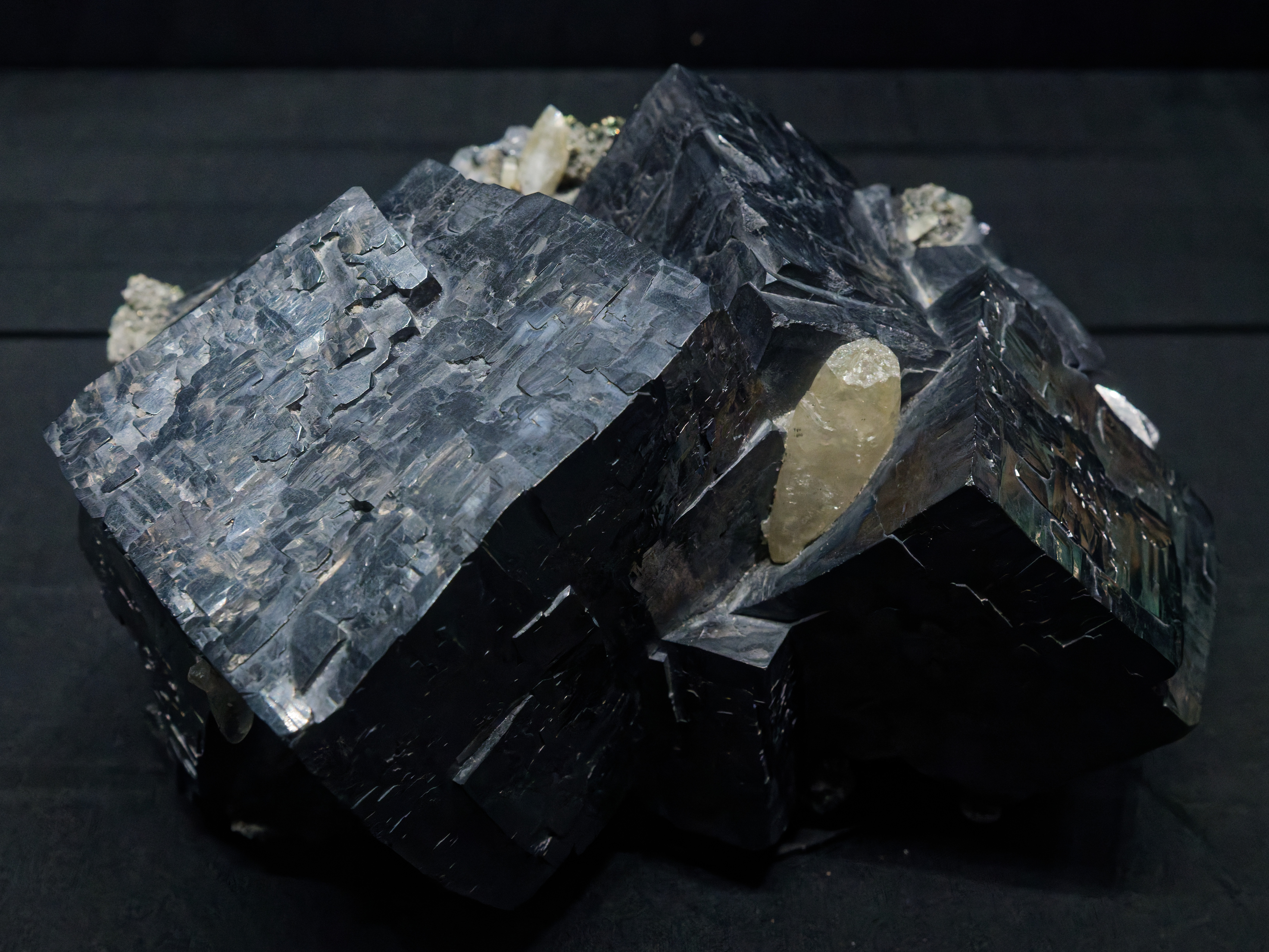
Galena from Sweetwater, Missouri, USA (Sorbonne University).

Galena is the official state mineral of the U.S. states of Kansas, Missouri, and Wisconsin; the former mining communities of Galena, Kansas, Galena, Illinois, Galena, South Dakota and Galena, Alaska, take their names from deposits of this mineral.

== Structure ==
Galena belongs to the octahedral sulfide group of minerals that have metal ions in octahedral positions, such as the iron sulfide pyrrhotite and the nickel arsenide niccolite. The galena group is named after its most common member, with other isometric members that include manganese bearing alabandite and niningerite.

Divalent lead (Pb) cations and sulfur (S) anions form a close-packed cubic unit cell much like the mineral halite of the halide mineral group. Zinc, cadmium, iron, copper, antimony, arsenic, bismuth and selenium also occur in variable amounts in galena. Selenium substitutes for sulfur in the structure constituting a solid solution series. The lead telluride mineral altaite has the same crystal structure as galena.

== Geochemistry ==
Within the weathering or oxidation zone galena alters to anglesite (lead sulfate) or cerussite (lead carbonate). Galena exposed to acid mine drainage can be oxidized to anglesite by naturally occurring bacteria and archaea, in a process similar to bioleaching.

== Uses ==
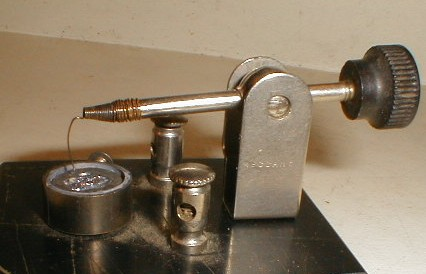
Galena cat's whisker detector

One of the oldest uses of galena was to produce kohl, an eye cosmetic now regarded as toxic due to the risk of lead poisoning. In Ancient Egypt, this was applied around the eyes to reduce the glare of the desert sun and to repel flies, which were a potential source of disease.

In pre-Columbian North America, galena was used by indigenous peoples as an ingredient in decorative paints and cosmetics, and widely traded throughout the eastern United States. Traces of galena are frequently found at the Mississippian city at Kincaid Mounds in present-day Illinois. The galena used at the site originated from deposits in southeastern and central Missouri and the Upper Mississippi Valley.

Galena is the primary ore of lead, and is often mined for its silver content. It is used as a source of lead in ceramic glaze.

Galena is a semiconductor with a small band gap of about 0.4 eV, which found use in early Wireless communication systems. It was used as the crystal in crystal radio receivers, in which it was used as a point-contact diode capable of rectifying alternating current to detect the radio signals. The galena crystal was used with a sharp wire, known as a "cat's whisker", in contact with it.

In modern times, galena is primarily used to extract its constituent minerals. In addition to silver, it is the most important source of lead, for uses such as in lead-acid batteries.

== See also ==
- List of minerals
- Lead smelter
