= Talmage City, Missouri =

Unincorporated community in Missouri, U.S.

Coordinates: 37°00′43″N 94°05′27″W

Talmage City (also known as Talmage) was an unincorporated community in northeast Newton County, in the U.S. state of Missouri. The community was adjacent to Missouri Route 37 approximately 1.5 miles northwest of Wentworth.

== History ==
A post office called Talmage was established in 1878, and remained in operation until 1895. The community was named after the proprietor of a local country store.
