= Berwick Township =

Berwick Township may refer to the following townships in the United States:

- Berwick Township, Warren County, Illinois
- Berwick Township, Newton County, Missouri
- Berwick Township, Pennsylvania
