= Silver Creek, Missouri =

- Neighborhood
- Location of Silver Creek, Missouri
- Coordinates: 37°02′26″N 94°28′22″W
- Country: United States
- State: Missouri
- County: Newton

Area
  - Total: 0.80 sq mi (2.07 km^{2})
  - Land: 0.80 sq mi (2.07 km^{2})
  - Water: 0 sq mi (0 km^{2})
- Elevation: 1,037 ft (316 m)

Population (2010)
  - Total: 623
  - Estimate (2018): 627
  - Density: 779/sq mi (300.7/km^{2})
- Time zone: UTC-6 (Central (CST))
  - Summer (DST): UTC-5 (CDT)
- FIPS code: 29-67880
- GNIS feature ID: 0726443

Silver Creek was a village in Newton County, Missouri, United States. The population was 623 at the 2010 census. It is part of the Joplin, Missouri Metropolitan Statistical Area. On August 7, 2012, residents of the Village of Silver Creek and the City of Joplin voted to consolidate and become part of the city of Joplin.

== History ==
Silver Creek once contained a schoolhouse. The school took its name from nearby Silver Creek.

== Geography ==
Silver Creek is located southeast of the intersection of U.S. Route 71 and I-44. The community of Saginaw lies one mile south The stream Silver Creek flows past the west side of the community.

According to the United States Census Bureau, the village has a total area of 0.80 square miles (2.07 km^{2}), all land.

== Demographics ==
Historical population
Census	Pop.	Note	%±
1960	152		—
1970	381		150.7%
1980	519		36.2%
1990	513		−1.2%
2000	608		18.5%
2010	623		2.5%
2018 (est.)	627		0.6%
U.S. Decennial Census

=== 2010 census ===
As of the census of 2010, there were 623 people, 249 households, and 202 families living in the village. The population density was 778.8 inhabitants per square mile (300.7/km^{2}). There were 260 housing units at an average density of 325.0 per square mile (125.5/km^{2}). The racial makeup of the village was 95.3% White, 2.1% Native American, 1.0% from other races, and 1.6% from two or more races. Hispanic or Latino of any race were 1.9% of the population.

There were 249 households, of which 21.7% had children under the age of 18 living with them, 69.9% were married couples living together, 7.6% had a female householder with no husband present, 3.6% had a male householder with no wife present, and 18.9% were non-families. 14.5% of all households were made up of individuals, and 8.4% had someone living alone who was 65 years of age or older. The average household size was 2.50 and the average family size was 2.70.

The median age in the village was 50.5 years. 17.2% of residents were under the age of 18; 5.6% were between the ages of 18 and 24; 19.3% were from 25 to 44; 32.5% were from 45 to 64; and 25.5% were 65 years of age or older. The gender makeup of the village was 46.7% male and 53.3% female.

=== 2000 census ===
As of the census of 2000, there were 608 people, 238 households, and 191 families living in the village. The population density was 776.2 inhabitants per square mile (299.7/km^{2}). There were 248 housing units at an average density of 316.6 per square mile (122.2/km^{2}). The racial makeup of the village was 95.39% White, 1.15% Native American, 0.99% Asian, 0.33% from other races, and 2.14% from two or more races. Hispanic or Latino of any race were 0.16% of the population.

There were 238 households, out of which 25.6% had children under the age of 18 living with them, 71.0% were married couples living together, 6.7% had a female householder with no husband present, and 19.7% were non-families. 16.0% of all households were made up of individuals, and 8.8% had someone living alone who was 65 years of age or older. The average household size was 2.55 and the average family size was 2.83.

In the village, the population was spread out, with 20.9% under the age of 18, 7.1% from 18 to 24, 19.4% from 25 to 44, 34.9% from 45 to 64, and 17.8% who were 65 years of age or older. The median age was 47 years. For every 100 females, there were 94.9 males. For every 100 females age 18 and over, there were 94.0 males.

The median income for a household in the village was $45,781, and the median income for a family was $50,313. Males had a median income of $31,923 versus $25,104 for females. The per capita income for the village was $24,677. About 3.2% of families and 3.2% of the population were below the poverty line, including none of those under the age of eighteen or sixty-five or over.
