= Aroma, Missouri =

Unincorporated community in Missouri, U.S.

Coordinates: 36°51′49″N 94°15′53″W

Location of Aroma within the state of Missouri

Aroma is an unincorporated community in southern Newton County, in the U.S. state of Missouri. The community is on the north bank of Hickory Creek 1.5 miles (2.4 km) east of Monark Springs. It is on Missouri Route H 2.5 miles (4.0 km) north of Sweetwater and 4.5 miles (7.2 km) east of Neosho.

== History ==
A post office called Aroma was established in 1910, and remained in operation until it was discontinued in 1911. The area was so named on account of the Aroma variety of the strawberry crop produced there.
