= Clear Creek (Shoal Creek tributary) =

River in Missouri, United States

Coordinates: 36°56′06″N 94°08′58″W

Clear Creek is a stream in Barry, Lawrence and Newton counties in southwest Missouri. It is a tributary to Shoal Creek.

The stream headwaters arise in northwest Barry County on the west side of Kings Prairie at at an elevation of 1415 feet. The stream flows northwest passing under U.S. Route 60 and through the south side of city of Monett. It enters the southwest corner of Lawrence County and passes just south of Pierce City and under Missouri Route 97. It enters Newton County and passes north of the community of Berwick and enters Shoal Creek 2.5 miles west of Berwick and two miles east of Ritchey. The confluence is at and an elevation of 1060 feet.

Early settlers in Lawrence County named the stream for its clear waters.
