= Warren Branch =

Stream in the US state of Missouri

Warren Branch is a stream in Newton County, Missouri and Ottawa County, Oklahoma. It is a tributary of the Spring River.

The stream headwaters arise at 36°55′45″N 94°32′23″W just east of Missouri Route 43 approximately seven miles north-northeast of Seneca. The stream flows generally west for approximately three miles and enters Ottawa County, Oklahoma. Within Oklahoma the stream turns to the southwest and flows past the community of Peoria to enter the Spring River at 36°53′32″N 94°43′43″W.

Warren Branch (also called "Warren Creek") has the name of the local Warren family.

== See also ==
- List of rivers of Missouri
- List of rivers of Oklahoma
