= Jollification (disambiguation) =

Jollification is an album by The Lightning Seeds

Jollification may also refer to:

- Enjoyment
- Jollification, Missouri
- "Jollification", song by The Viceroys from the compilation The Viceroys at Studio One: Ya Ho 1995
- "Jollification", track from Saving Mr. Banks OST album
