= Gregg, Missouri =

Unincorporated community in Missouri, U.S.

Coordinates: 37°03′07″N 94°33′52″W

Gregg is an unincorporated community in Newton County, in the U.S. state of Missouri.

== History ==
A post office called Gregg was established in 1892, and remained in operation until 1906. The community has the name of one Mr. Gregg, a local prospector.
