= Jolly, Missouri =

Unincorporated community in Missouri, U.S.

Coordinates: 36°53′45″N 94°04′13″W

Jolly is an unincorporated community in eastern Newton County, in the U.S. state of Missouri. A variant name was "Jollification". The community is on Capps Creek approximately eight miles west-southwest of Monett in adjacent Barry County and five miles southwest of Pierce City in southwest Lawrence County.

== History ==
A post office called Jolly was established in 1898, and remained in operation until 1903. Jolly was named after the proprietor of a nearby watermill. Jolly Mill, built on Capps Creek in 1848, is listed on the National Register of Historic Places.

The historic mill community is the centerpiece of the privately funded "Jolly Mill Park", open to the public.
