= Loma Linda, Missouri =

- Town
- Location of Loma Linda, Missouri
- Coordinates: 36°59′34″N 94°35′43″W
- Country: United States
- State: Missouri
- County: Newton

Area
  - Total: 3.56 sq mi (9.23 km^{2})
  - Land: 3.56 sq mi (9.21 km^{2})
  - Water: 0.0077 sq mi (0.02 km^{2})
- Elevation: 1,070 ft (330 m)

Population (2020)
  - Total: 943
  - Density: 265.2/sq mi (102.38/km^{2})
- Time zone: UTC-6 (Central (CST))
  - Summer (DST): UTC-5 (CDT)
- Postal code: 64804
- FIPS code: 29-43672
- GNIS feature ID: 2396722
- Website: http://www.lomalinda-mo.us/index.php

Loma Linda is a town in Newton County, Missouri, United States. As of the 2020 census, Loma Linda had a population of 943. It is part of the Joplin, Missouri Metropolitan Statistical Area.

== History ==
The village, a collection of homes and properties surrounding the golf course and country club of the name, was incorporated in 1995. Loma Linda Country Club was created by Joe Blau of New York and the late Ted Hoffman in 1971. Until August 2005, the golf professional at Loma Linda was Benny Pell.

On January 1, 2006, the course, Village Water Company, and the surrounding 2,500 acres (10 km^{2}) area were sold to Joplin businessman Bobby Landis. Landis had acquired the resort and apartment complex of Loma Linda by the end of 2005. In 2007, the Country Club was sold to the Downstream Casino and Resort owned and operated by the Quapaw Tribe. The tribe also owns a casino less than a mile west of the Loma Linda property. The country club was split into three golf courses: The Eagle Creek Golf Club at Downstream Casino Resort, Bald Eagle Golf Course, and Golden Eagle Golf Courses.

Loma Linda is part of the Seneca R-7 school district.

== Geography ==
According to the United States Census Bureau, the village has a total area of 3.57 square miles (9.25 km^{2}), of which 3.56 square miles (9.22 km^{2}) is land and 0.01 square miles (0.03 km^{2}) is water.

== Demographics ==
Historical population
Census	Pop.	Note	%±
2000	507		—
2010	725		43.0%
2020	943		30.1%
U.S. Decennial Census

=== 2010 census ===
At the 2010 census, there were 725 people, 302 households and 241 families residing in the village. The population density was 203.7 inhabitants per square mile (78.6/km^{2}). There were 327 housing units at an average density of 91.9 per square mile (35.5/km^{2}). The racial makeup of the village was 89.0% White, 2.6% African American, 4.7% Native American, 1.1% Asian, 0.3% Pacific Islander, 0.1% from other races, and 2.2% from two or more races. Hispanic or Latino of any race were 2.8% of the population.

There were 302 households, of which 25.5% had children under the age of 18 living with them, 73.5% were married couples living together, 4.0% had a female householder with no husband present, 2.3% had a male householder with no wife present, and 20.2% were non-families. 16.9% of all households were made up of individuals, and 4.6% had someone living alone who was 65 years of age or older. The average household size was 2.40 and the average family size was 2.66.

The median age in the village was 50.4 years. 18.6% of residents were under the age of 18; 4.7% were between the ages of 18 and 24; 19.3% were from 25 to 44; 38.1% were from 45 to 64; and 19.2% were 65 years of age or older. The gender makeup of the village was 50.9% male and 49.1% female.

=== 2000 census ===
At the 2000 census, there were 507 people, 203 households and 169 families residing in the town. The population density was 141.1 inhabitants per square mile (54.5/km^{2}). There were 220 housing units at an average density of 61.2 per square mile (23.6/km^{2}). The racial makeup of the town was 96.25% White, 0.79% African American, 1.78% Native American, 0.39% Asian, 0.20% from other races, and 0.59% from two or more races. Hispanic or Latino of any race were 1.58% of the population.

There were 203 households, of which 28.6% had children under the age of 18 living with them, 74.9% were married couples living together, 4.4% had a female householder with no husband present, and 16.7% were non-families. 12.8% of all households were made up of individuals, and 3.0% had someone living alone who was 65 years of age or older. The average household size was 2.50 and the average family size was 2.72.

20.3% of the population were under the age of 18, 5.3% from 18 to 24, 26.8% from 25 to 44, 34.5% from 45 to 64, and 13.0% who were 65 years of age or older. The median age was 44 years. For every 100 females, there were 105.3 males. For every 100 females age 18 and over, there were 106.1 males.

The median household income was $53,750 and the median family income was $61,250. Males had a median income of $52,188 compared with $26,500 for females. The per capita income for the town was $28,583. About 1.2% of families and 1.4% of the population were below the poverty line, including none of those under the age of eighteen or sixty-five or over.
