= Rock Branch (Fivemile Creek tributary) =

Stream in the U.S. state of Missouri

Rock Branch (also called Rock Creek) is a stream in the U.S. states of Missouri and Oklahoma. It is a tributary of Fivemile Creek.

The stream headwaters arise at 37°00′19″N 94°33′23″W approximately five miles southwest of Joplin and one mile south of I-44. The stream flows to the southwest roughly parallel to I-44. The stream confluence with Fivemile Creek is in Oklahoma at 36°58′51″N 94°37′27″W and just under one half mile west of the Missouri-Oklahoma border.

Rock Branch was so named on account of the rocky character of its creek bed.

== See also ==
- List of rivers of Missouri
- List of rivers of Oklahoma
