= McElhany, Missouri =

Unincorporated community in Newton County, Missouri, United States

Coordinates: 36°47′17″N 94°23′56″W

McElhany is an unincorporated community in southern Newton County, Missouri, United States.

== Description ==
The community is located on Interstate 49 Business and Missouri Route 59 (the former routing of U.S. Route 71 before it was re-routed to run concurrent with Interstate 49), approximately five miles (8.0 km) south of the main part of Neosho. Despite, being along these highways, the roadways themselves are within the city limits of Neosho.

== History ==
A post office called McElhany was established in 1896, and remained in operation until 1911. The community has the name of the local McElhany family.
