= Fivemile Creek (Spring River tributary) =

Stream in the U.S. state of Missouri

Fivemile Creek is a stream in Newton County, Missouri and Ottawa County, Oklahoma in the United States. It is a tributary of the Spring River in northeastern Oklahoma.

The stream headwaters arise at 36°56′16″N 94°31′42″W at 1,153 ft (351 m) elevation. The stream flows to the northwest and passes under Missouri Route 43 just south of the community of Hornet. It passes into the northeast corner of Oklahoma and under I-44. It turns to the southwest, flows past the community of Five Mile and enters the Spring River approximately 2.5 miles south of Baxter Springs, Kansas. The confluence is at 36°58′48″N 94°42′03″W at an elevation of 797 ft (243 m).

The watercourse of Fivemile Creek is approximately 5 miles (8.0 km) from Neosho, Missouri, hence the name. However, the headwaters of the stream are approximately nine miles northwest of Neosho and it flows to the northwest away from the city.

== See also ==
- List of rivers of Missouri
- List of rivers of Oklahoma
