= Parshley, Missouri =

Unincorporated community in the US state of Missouri

Coordinates: 37°04′27″N 94°14′23″W

Parshley is an unincorporated community in southern Jasper County, in the U.S. state of Missouri.

The community lies just south of Interstate 44 between Sarcoxie and Joplin. The Jasper-Newton county line is approximately one mile south of the village.

== History ==
A post office called Parshley was established in 1890, and remained in operation until 1901. The community was named after a local merchant.
