= Berwick Township, Newton County, Missouri =

Township in Newton County, Missouri, U.S.

Coordinates: 36°54′41″N 94°06′33″W

Berwick Township is an inactive township in Newton County, in the U.S. state of Missouri.

It has a population of 334, and is home to Berwick Church, Wright cemetery, as well as Clear Creek and Capps Creek.

Berwick Township took its name from the community of Berwick, Missouri.
