= Hickory Creek (Shoal Creek tributary) =

Stream in the U.S. state of Missouri

Hickory Creek is a stream in Newton County in the U.S. state of Missouri. It is a tributary of Shoal Creek.

The stream headwaters arise at 36°50′44″N 94°14′39″W at an elevation of approximately 1265 feet and the stream flows generally west past the communities of Monark Springs and Aroma before passing under U.S. Route 60. The stream continues northwest past the northeast side of Neosho to its confluence with Shoal Creek just north of Neosho at 36°53′37″N 94°22′15″W at an elevation of 981 feet.

Hickory Creek was so named due to the presence of hickory timber in the area.

== See also ==
- List of rivers of Missouri
