= Pierce City High School =

Location
- 300 N Myrtle St; Pierce City, Missouri; United States
- Coordinates: 36.9486°N 93.9987°W

Information
- Type: Public Secondary (High School)
- Principal: Shannon Holden
- Teaching staff: 18.05 (FTE)
- Grades: 9–12
- Gender: Co-ed
- Enrollment: 204 (2023-2024)
- Student to teacher ratio: 11.30
- Color
- Mascot: Eagle
- Website: www.pcschools.net

Pierce City High School is the public high school for Pierce City, Missouri, United States.

They have a basketball team.

== Notable alumni ==
- Jack Goodman, was a Republican member of the Missouri Senate
