= Christopher, Missouri =

Unincorporated community in Missouri, U.S.

Coordinates: 36°47′55″N 94°17′23″W

Christopher is an unincorporated community in Newton County, in the U.S. state of Missouri.

== History ==
A post office called Christopher was established in 1885, and remained in operation until 1907. Besides the post office, the community had a school, the Christopher School, now defunct. The schoolhouse was named after the Christopher family of settlers.
