= June, Missouri =

Unincorporated community in Missouri, U.S.

Coordinates: 36°48′04″N 94°21′37″W

June is an unincorporated community in Newton County, in the U.S. state of Missouri.

== History ==
A post office called June was established in 1900, and remained in operation until 1905. According to tradition, the community was named after the month the largest share of first settlers arrived, in June.
