= Wentworth, Missouri =

- Village
- Location of Wentworth, Missouri
- Coordinates: 36°59′36″N 94°4′32″W
- Country: United States
- State: Missouri
- County: Newton

Area
  - Total: 0.19 sq mi (0.48 km^{2})
  - Land: 0.19 sq mi (0.48 km^{2})
  - Water: 0 sq mi (0.00 km^{2})
- Elevation: 1,221 ft (372 m)

Population (2020)
  - Total: 98
  - Density: 532.7/sq mi (205.69/km^{2})
- Time zone: UTC-6 (Central (CST))
  - Summer (DST): UTC-5 (CDT)
- FIPS code: 29-78424
- GNIS feature ID: 2400125

Wentworth is a village in northeastern Newton County, Missouri, United States. As of the 2020 census, Wentworth had a population of 98. It is part of the Joplin, Missouri Metropolitan Statistical Area.

== History ==
Wentworth was founded in the 1880s, and probably took its name from Wentworth, North Carolina, the native home of a share of the first settlers. Mining was historically the primary industry in Wentworth. A post office called Wentworth had been in operation since 1890. However, this post office was destroyed by a tornado in 2011.

== Geography ==
Wentworth is located on Missouri Route 37 approximately 4.5 miles southeast of Sarcoxie in adjacent Jasper County. Pierce City is about four miles to the southeast in southwest Lawrence County.

According to the United States Census Bureau, the village has a total area of 0.18 square miles (0.47 km^{2}), all land.

== Demographics ==
Historical population
Census	Pop.	Note	%±
1900	238		—
1910	154		−35.3%
1920	267		73.4%
1930	182		−31.8%
1940	253		39.0%
1950	212		−16.2%
1960	174		−17.9%
1970	132		−24.1%
1980	118		−10.6%
1990	138		16.9%
2000	141		2.2%
2010	151		7.1%
2020	98		−35.1%
U.S. Decennial Census

=== 2010 census ===
As of the census of 2010, there were 147 people, 54 households, and 41 families living in the village. The population density was 816.7 inhabitants per square mile (315.3/km^{2}). There were 68 housing units at an average density of 377.8 per square mile (145.9/km^{2}). The racial makeup of the village was 97.3% White, 0.7% African American, and 2.0% Native American.

There were 54 households, of which 37.0% had children under the age of 18 living with them, 53.7% were married couples living together, 13.0% had a female householder with no husband present, 9.3% had a male householder with no wife present, and 24.1% were non-families. 20.4% of all households were made up of individuals, and 7.5% had someone living alone who was 65 years of age or older. The average household size was 2.72 and the average family size was 3.12.

The median age in the village was 38.2 years. 26.5% of residents were under the age of 18; 11.5% were between the ages of 18 and 24; 25.2% were from 25 to 44; 24.5% were from 45 to 64; and 12.2% were 65 years of age or older. The gender makeup of the village was 53.1% male and 46.9% female.

=== 2000 census ===
As of the census of 2000, there were 141 people, 58 households, and 41 families living in the village. The population density was 718.5 inhabitants per square mile (277.4/km^{2}). There were 65 housing units at an average density of 331.2 per square mile (127.9/km^{2}). The racial makeup of the village was 97.16% White, 1.42% Native American, 0.71% Pacific Islander, and 0.71% from two or more races.

There were 58 households, out of which 31.0% had children under the age of 18 living with them, 51.7% were married couples living together, 17.2% had a female householder with no husband present, and 27.6% were non-families. 20.7% of all households were made up of individuals, and 13.8% had someone living alone who was 65 years of age or older. The average household size was 2.43 and the average family size was 2.81.

In the village, the population was spread out, with 24.1% under the age of 18, 8.5% from 18 to 24, 22.7% from 25 to 44, 24.8% from 45 to 64, and 19.9% who were 65 years of age or older. The median age was 40 years. For every 100 females, there were 93.2 males. For every 100 females age 18 and over, there were 84.5 males.

The median income for a household in the village was $19,063, and the median income for a family was $16,667. Males had a median income of $17,083 versus $19,063 for females. The per capita income for the village was $12,051. There were 40.9% of families and 32.8% of the population living below the poverty line, including 43.8% of under eighteens and 29.6% of those over 64.
