= Spurgeon, Missouri =

Unincorporated community in Missouri, U.S.

Coordinates: 36°56′04″N 94°28′18″W

Spurgeon is an unincorporated community in Newton County, in the U.S. state of Missouri. The community is on Missouri Route NN approximately seven miles northwest of Neosho.

== History ==
Spurgeon had its start ca. 1880 as a mining community, and named after the local Spurgeon family. A post office called Spurgeon was established in 1884, and remained in operation until 1912.
