= Pepsin, Missouri =

Unincorporated community in Missouri, U.S.

Coordinates: 37°01′25″N 94°14′31″W

Pepsin is an unincorporated community in Newton County, in the U.S. state of Missouri.

== History ==
A post office called Pepsin was established in 1892, and remained in operation until 1903. It is unknown why the name "Pepsin" was applied to this community.
