= Hornet, Missouri =

Hornet
- Unincorporated community
- Location within the state of Missouri
- Coordinates: 36°57′43″N 94°33′26″W
- Country: United States
- State: Missouri
- County: Newton
- Time zone: UTC-6 (Central (CST))
  - Summer (DST): UTC-5 (CDT)

Hornet is an unincorporated community in western Newton County, Missouri, United States. It is located approximately six miles southwest of Joplin, less than one mile west of Route 43. The community is part of the Joplin, Missouri Metropolitan Statistical Area. West of Hornet is the famous Hornet Spooklight, which is a few miles west at the Oklahoma state line.

A post office called Hornet was established in 1882, and remained in operation until 1902. According to tradition, the local country store was as busy as a "hornet", hence the name.
