= Racine, Missouri =

Racine
- Unincorporated community
- Location within the state of Missouri
- Coordinates: 36°53′44.9″N 94°31′38.0″W
- Country: United States
- State: Missouri
- County: Newton
- Elevation: 961 ft (293 m)

Population
  - Total: Estimated at 200 within ½ mile radius of the Racine Post Office; an exact population figure is impossible because there are no defined city limits.
  - Demonym: Racinian
- Time zone: UTC-6 (Central (CST))
  - Summer (DST): UTC-5 (CDT)
- ZIP code: 64858
- Area code: 417

Racine is an unincorporated community in Newton County, Missouri, United States. It is part of the Joplin, Missouri Metropolitan Statistical Area.

== History ==
A post office called Racine has been in operation since 1869. The town was originally called Dayton, after Dayton, Ohio, as was the surrounding township. However, there was already a Dayton, Missouri, causing confusion for Postal Service deliveries. The name was changed in 1871 to Racine, after Racine, Wisconsin. The name of Dayton Township remained the same.

== Geography ==
Racine is located along the Frisco Railroad tracks between Neosho and Seneca in Lost Creek Valley. Racine is on Route 86 where Route K and Route CC intersect. It is positioned geographically among three other towns: it is 6 miles west of Neosho, 10 miles south of Joplin, and 5½ miles northeast of Seneca.

== Education ==
Racine is encompassed entirely by the Seneca School District; it schools all students enrolled in public education in the community.

== Buildings ==
There are two churches in town, an Apostolic Church and a large Christian church. A small fire station is located here that is part of the Seneca Area Fire Protection District.
