= Sweetwater, Missouri =

Unincorporated community in Missouri

Coordinates: 36°49′36″N 94°15′57″W

Sweetwater is an unincorporated community in Newton County, in the U.S. state of Missouri. The community is located at the intersection of Missouri routes H and HH approximately five miles southeast of Neosho. Aroma is 2.5 miles north and Boulder City lies two miles southeast on Route H.

== History ==
A post office called Sweetwater was established in 1894, and remained in operation until 1907. The community was named after nearby Sweetwater Branch creek.
