= Seneca, Missouri =

- City
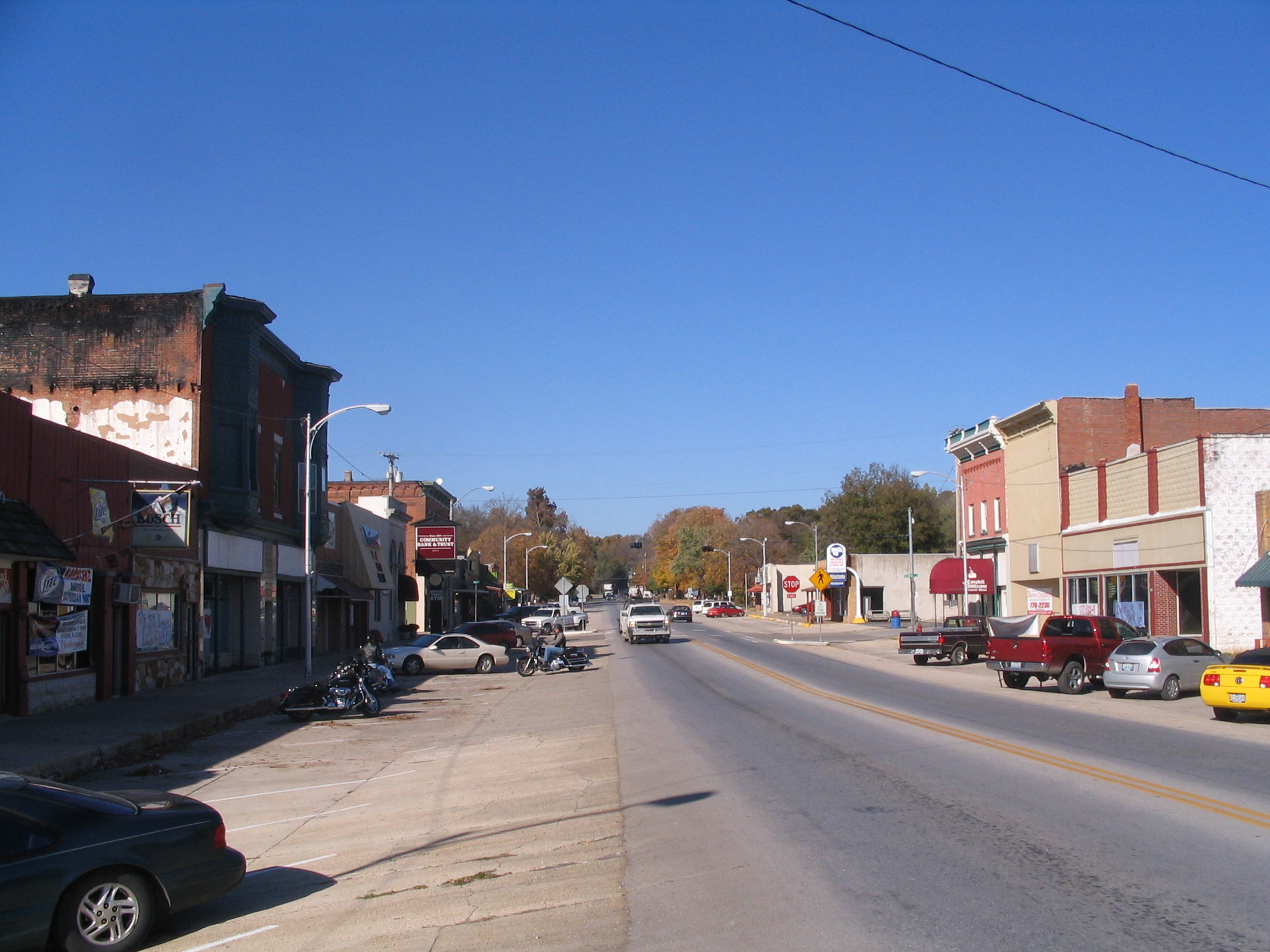
- Downtown Seneca

- Location of Seneca, Missouri
- Coordinates: 36°50′40″N 94°36′34″W
- Country: United States
- State: Missouri
- County: Newton

Area
  - Total: 2.56 sq mi (6.63 km^{2})
  - Land: 2.56 sq mi (6.63 km^{2})
  - Water: 0 sq mi (0.00 km^{2})
- Elevation: 948 ft (289 m)

Population (2020)
  - Total: 2,230
  - Density: 871.4/sq mi (336.46/km^{2})
  - Demonym: Senecan or Senecanian
- Time zone: UTC-6 (Central (CST))
  - Summer (DST): UTC-5 (CDT)
- ZIP code: 64865
- Area code: 417
- FIPS code: 29-66674
- GNIS feature ID: 2396574
- Website: www.cityofseneca.org

Seneca is a city in western Newton County, Missouri, United States. As of the 2020 census, Seneca had a population of 2,230. Located on the southwestern border of the state, the city is part of the Joplin, Missouri Metropolitan Statistical Area.

== History ==
Seneca was platted by European Americans in 1869, following the Civil War. The city was named for the Seneca Nation, one of the Six Nations of the Iroquois League, or Haudenosaunee, who had been historically based in New York and south of the Great Lakes.

In the 1830s, many of the Seneca people still in the East had been pushed west of the Mississippi River into Indian Territory, which included parts of present-day Missouri, Kansas and Oklahoma. "This tribe was moved to the Indian Territory not many miles west of town. The word is a corruption of the Dutch word "Sinnekaas," a term applied to them."

A post office called Seneca has been in operation since 1869.

Several houses in the rural northern Seneca area were destroyed by a tornado on May 10, 2008 in the Mid-May 2008 tornado outbreak sequence. An EF4 tornado hit the county, killing 13 people. The Early Show broadcast their national weather report from the city on the following Monday morning.

On the one- year anniversary of the tornado, Bill Lant, owner of Lant's Feed and Country Store, unveiled a memorial for the people who had died in the disaster. He had donated the plot of land and memorial, and had the memorial built next to his store.

== Geography ==
Seneca is located on Lost Creek, approximately one-quarter mile from the Missouri-Oklahoma state line. Missouri Route 43 passes through the town and U.S. Route 60 passes just south of the location. Neosho is about ten miles east, along Route 60.

According to the United States Census Bureau, the city has a total area of 2.56 square miles (6.63 km^{2}), all land.

Seneca is located in Lost Creek Valley, five miles upstream from the Grand Lake of the Cherokees and five miles downstream from the quaint Old Settlers town of Racine. The Frisco Railroad (now Burlington-Northern) runs through this valley.

Prior to 1959, highway traffic to and from Oklahoma largely followed US 60 through Seneca. US 60 joins the more famous U.S. Route 66, approximately 15 miles west of Seneca.

== Demographics ==
Historical population
Census	Pop.	Note	%±
1870	285		—
1880	380		33.3%
1890	1,101		189.7%
1900	1,043		−5.3%
1910	981		−5.9%
1920	1,104		12.5%
1930	1,063		−3.7%
1940	1,091		2.6%
1950	1,195		9.5%
1960	1,478		23.7%
1970	1,577		6.7%
1980	1,853		17.5%
1990	1,885		1.7%
2000	2,135		13.3%
2010	2,336		9.4%
2020	2,230		−4.5%
U.S. Decennial Census

=== 2020 census ===
As of the 2020 census, Seneca had a population of 2,230. The median age was 36.0 years. 27.8% of residents were under the age of 18 and 18.6% of residents were 65 years of age or older. For every 100 females there were 86.8 males, and for every 100 females age 18 and over there were 83.5 males age 18 and over.

0.0% of residents lived in urban areas, while 100.0% lived in rural areas.

There were 842 households in Seneca, of which 34.9% had children under the age of 18 living in them. Of all households, 41.8% were married-couple households, 14.6% were households with a male householder and no spouse or partner present, and 36.3% were households with a female householder and no spouse or partner present. About 32.0% of all households were made up of individuals and 16.9% had someone living alone who was 65 years of age or older.

There were 952 housing units, of which 11.6% were vacant. The homeowner vacancy rate was 3.3% and the rental vacancy rate was 6.7%.

Racial composition as of the 2020 census
Race	Number	Percent
White	1,810	81.2%
Black or African American	7	0.3%
American Indian and Alaska Native	142	6.4%
Asian	14	0.6%
Native Hawaiian and Other Pacific Islander	3	0.1%
Some other race	21	0.9%
Two or more races	233	10.4%
Hispanic or Latino (of any race)	84	3.8%

=== 2010 census ===
As of the census of 2010, there were 2,336 people, 877 households, and 612 families living in the city. The population density was 912.5 inhabitants per square mile (352.3/km^{2}). There were 962 housing units at an average density of 375.8 per square mile (145.1/km^{2}). The racial makeup of the city was 85.3% White, 0.3% African American, 8.0% Native American, 0.4% Asian, 0.1% Pacific Islander, 0.4% from other races, and 5.5% from two or more races. Hispanic or Latino of any race were 2.2% of the population.

There were 877 households, of which 40.5% had children under the age of 18 living with them, 48.2% were married couples living together, 16.0% had a female householder with no husband present, 5.6% had a male householder with no wife present, and 30.2% were non-families. 26.7% of all households were made up of individuals, and 14% had someone living alone who was 65 years of age or older. The average household size was 2.60 and the average family size was 3.13.

The median age in the city was 35.3 years. 28.9% of residents were under the age of 18; 8.1% were between the ages of 18 and 24; 24% were from 25 to 44; 21.5% were from 45 to 64; and 17.3% were 65 years of age or older. The gender makeup of the city was 47.9% male and 52.1% female.

=== 2000 census ===
As of the census of 2000, there were 2,135 people, 820 households, and 575 families living in the city. The population density was 1,231.2 inhabitants per square mile (475.4/km^{2}). There were 876 housing units at an average density of 505.2 per square mile (195.1/km^{2}). The racial makeup of the city was 88.99% White, 0.09% African American, 6.56% Native American, 0.23% Asian, 0.09% Pacific Islander, 0.33% from other races, and 3.70% from two or more races. Hispanic or Latino of any race were 1.12% of the population.

There were 820 households, out of which 35.1% had children under the age of 18 living with them, 54.6% were married couples living together, 13.0% had a female householder with no husband present, and 29.8% were non-families. 27.7% of all households were made up of individuals, and 14.5% had someone living alone who was 65 years of age or older. The average household size was 2.49 and the average family size was 3.00.

In the city the population was spread out, with 26.9% under the age of 18, 8.0% from 18 to 24, 25.3% from 25 to 44, 19.8% from 45 to 64, and 20.0% who were 65 years of age or older. The median age was 38 years. For every 100 females, there were 81.7 males. For every 100 females age 18 and over, there were 75.4 males.

The median income for a household in the city was $29,441, and the median income for a family was $37,566. Males had a median income of $28,264 versus $19,662 for females. The per capita income for the city was $14,525. About 8.8% of families and 14.1% of the population were below the poverty line, including 15.4% of those under age 18 and 15.8% of those age 65 or over.

== Education ==
Public education in Seneca is administered by Seneca R-VII School District.

Seneca has a public library, the Seneca Branch Library.

== Notable people ==
- Scott Elbert - Pitcher for the Los Angeles Dodgers
- Steve Gaines - Guitarist for Lynyrd Skynyrd
- Cassie Gaines- Backup singer for Lynyrd Skynyrd; sister of Steve Gaines
- Little Britches - Female bandit, associated with Cattle Annie, resided in Seneca during her girlhood in the 1880s.
- Morris Watts - Former assistant football coach at Michigan State University

== Photo gallery ==
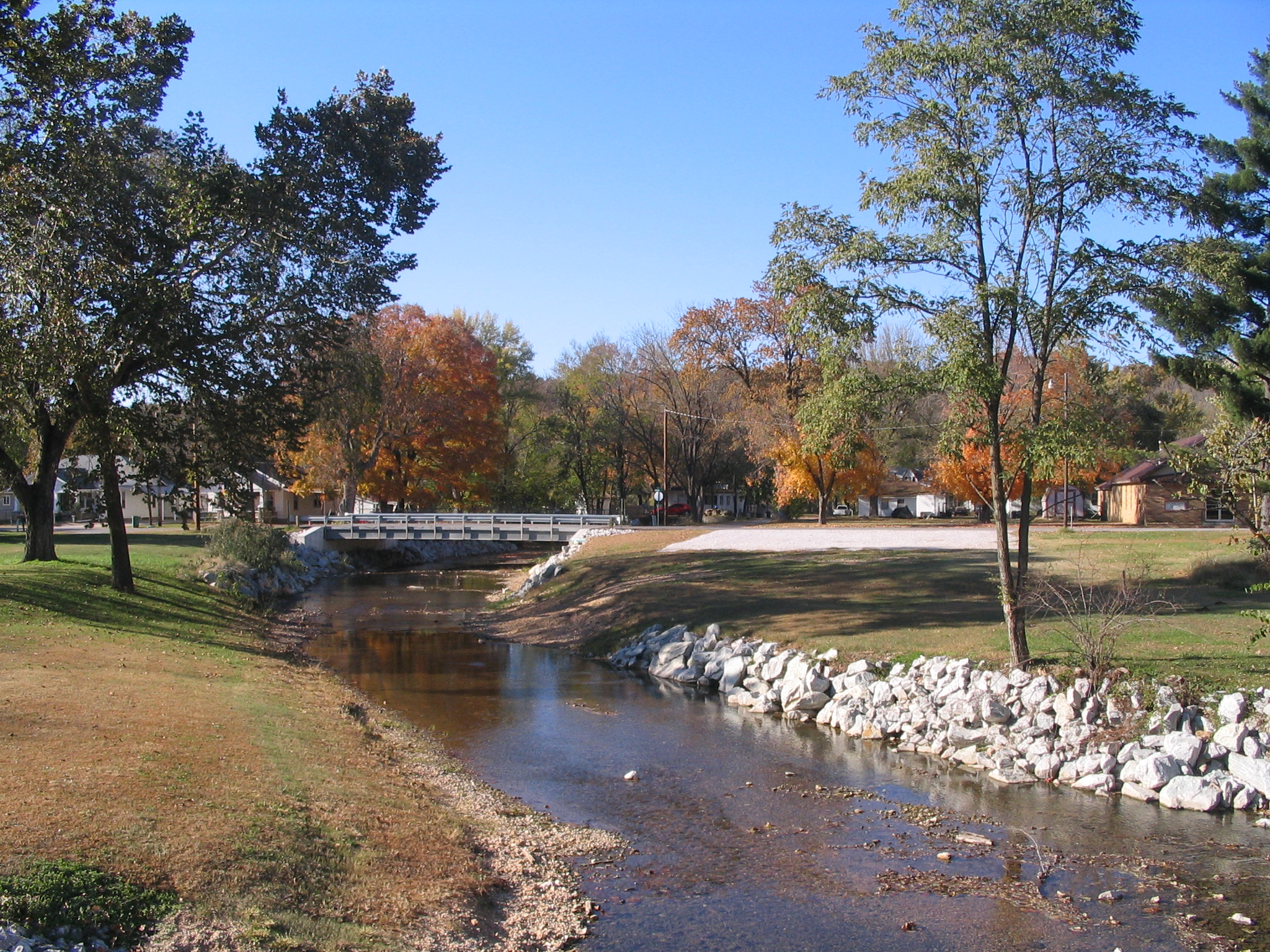
Bridge over Lost Creek, taken from Oneida Street.

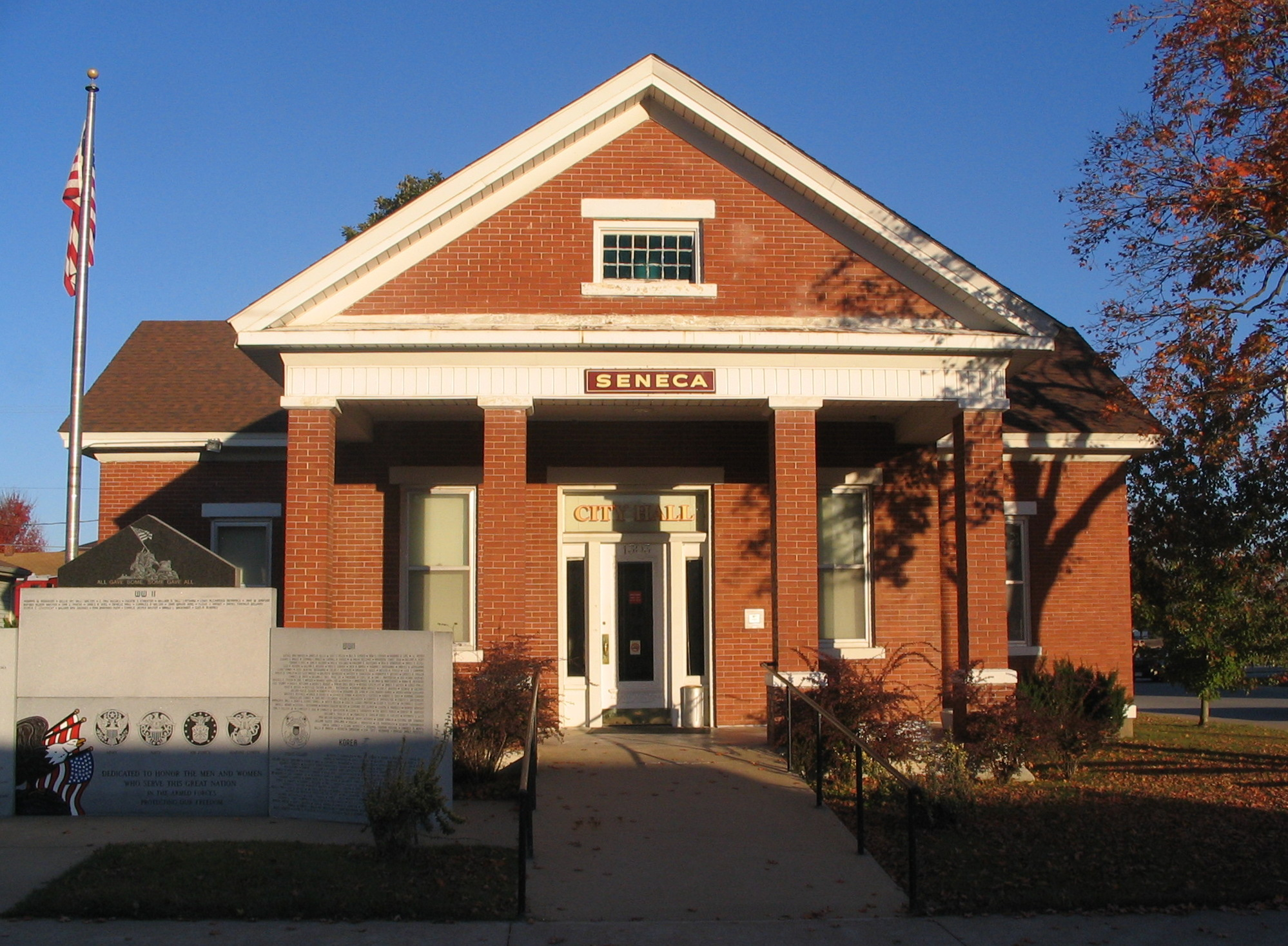
Seneca, Missouri City Hall. Note veterans monument in lower left-hand corner.

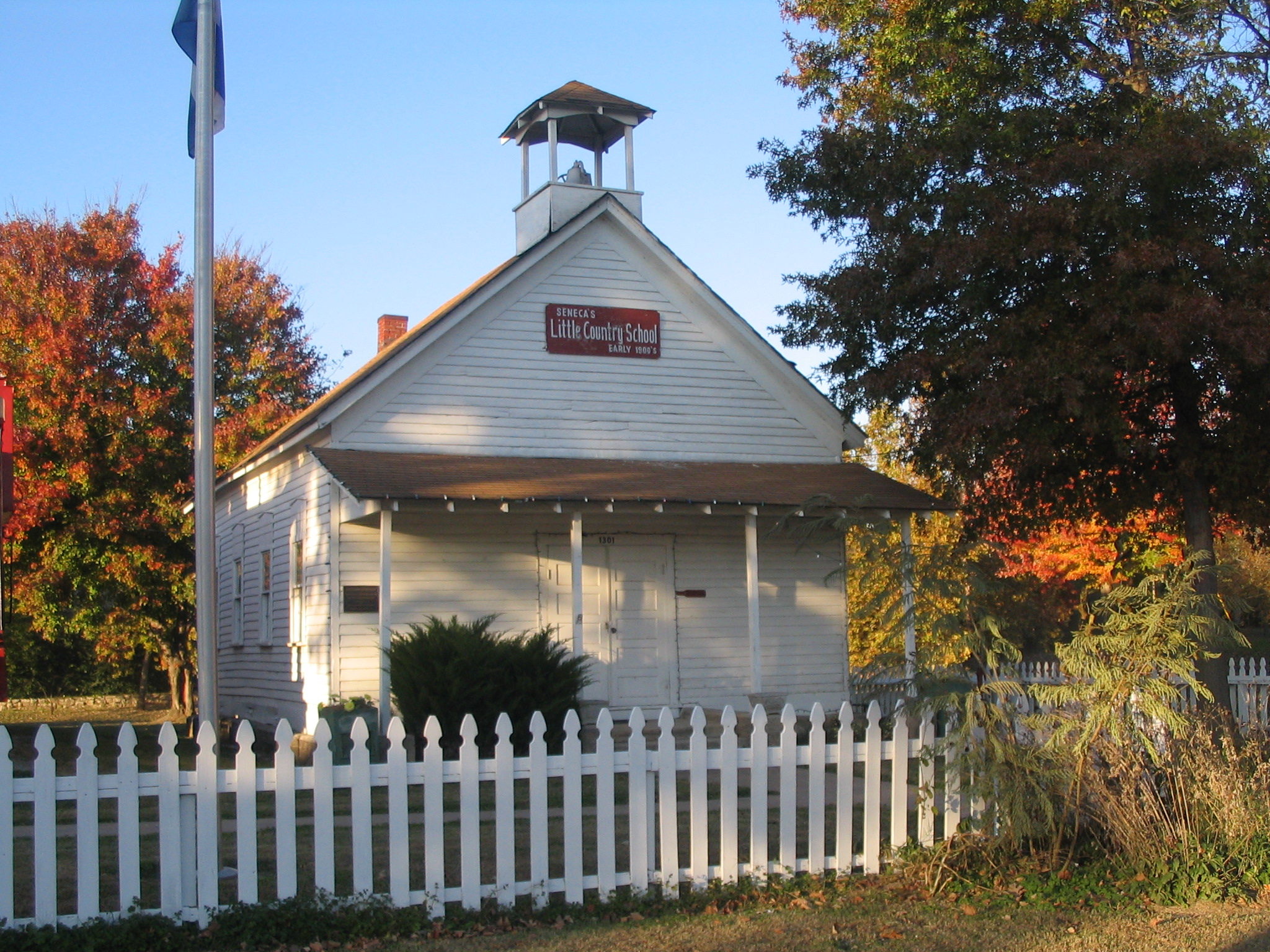
Old Schoolhouse behind City Hall.

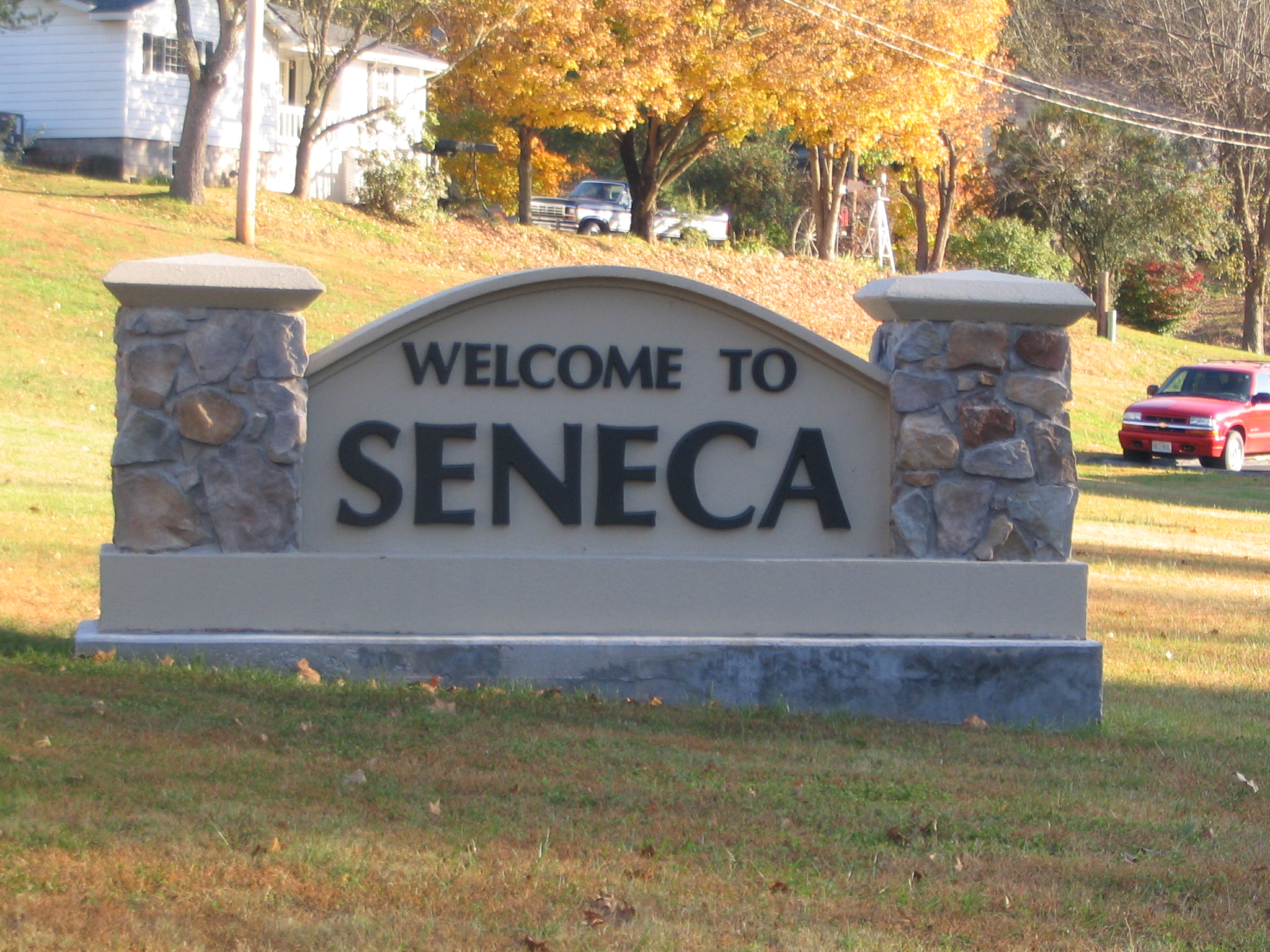
Sign welcoming people to Seneca, on MO 43.
