= Berwick, Missouri =

Unincorporated community in Missouri, U.S.

Coordinates: 36°55′59″N 94°05′41″W

Berwick is an unincorporated community in eastern Newton County, in the U.S. state of Missouri.

The community is located in the west flowing Clear Creek floodplain south of the stream. The Berwick cemetery and church are located on a hill southwest of the village location. Missouri Route JJ crosses the valley about one-half mile east and U.S. Route 60 passes one mile south of the community.

== History ==
A post office called Berwick was established in 1892, and remained in operation until 1908. The community was named after the proprietor of a local country store.
