= Monark Springs, Missouri =

Monark Springs
- Ghost town
- Location within the state of Missouri
- Coordinates: 36°51′52″N 94°17′30″W
- Country: United States
- State: Missouri
- County: Newton
- Elevation: 1,158 ft (353 m)
- Time zone: UTC-6 (Central (CST))
  - Summer (DST): UTC-5 (CDT)

Monark Springs is a ghost town in Newton County, Missouri, United States. It is located approximately five miles east of Neosho. The site is on the north bank of Hickory Creek about 1.5 miles east of U.S. Route 60. The spring associated with the town is located within the Hickory Creek floodplain approximately 500 feet to the southeast.

== History ==
Founded by Truman Elmore, the town was named after the Missouri and North Arkansas Railroad, resulting in the name, MoNArk Springs.

In August 1956, an outbreak of typhoid fever occurred in Monark Springs during a national Church of God camp meeting that had over 400 members from other states as far west as California and east to Kentucky, attending. The cases continued to spread outside of the town after the meeting, with 16 reported cases cropping up in various parts of Missouri and Kansas. CDC officials were sent to the camp site to investigate the water in the area, in order to determine the exact source of the outbreak. It was eventually discovered that a carrier of typhoid fever had unknowingly contaminated the water in the well that had been used as drinking water for the entire camp site.
