= Capps Creek (Shoal Creek tributary) =

Stream in the American state of Missouri

Capps Creek is a 13.4-mile-long (21.6 km) stream in Newton County, Missouri, United States. It is a tributary of Shoal Creek, and its water flows from there into the Spring River, then the Neosho River, the Arkansas River, and ultimately the Mississippi River. Capps Creek is best known for Jolly Mill Park, located at the old township site of Jollification, Missouri.

The creek is also known for trout fishing, as it is a White Ribbon Trout Area managed by the Missouri Department of Conservation. White Ribbon Trout Areas are stocked periodically with rainbow and, occasionally, brown trout. The fishing regulations are generally relaxed and allow anglers to use any live bait and keep up to four trout per day.

Jolly Mill and the former town of Jollification have a history reaching back into the mid-19th century. The mill was the anchor of the town, and the town survived on its success as a grist mill and whiskey distillery. The town was destroyed during the Civil War and rebuilt, but it ultimately died when the railroad bypassed the town. Jolly Mill is now managed by The Friends of Jolly Mill and The Ozark Highlanders as a public family-friendly park, and it is listed on the National Register of Historic Places.

Capps Creek was named after the local Capps family.

== Location ==
Mouth
Confluence with Shoal Creek, Newton County, Missouri: 36°53′17″N 94°05′37″W
Source
Barry County near Purdy, Missouri: 36°49′00″N 93°55′52″W

== See also ==
- List of rivers of Missouri
