= Silver Creek (Shoal Creek tributary) =

Stream in the American state of Missouri

Coordinates: 37°01′33″N 94°31′18″W

Silver Creek is a stream in Jasper and Newton counties in the U.S. state of Missouri. It is a tributary of Shoal Creek.

Silver Creek was so named on account of deposits of silver which allegedly were in the area.

== See also ==
- List of rivers of Missouri
