= Capps Creek (Current River tributary) =

Stream in the U.S. state of Missouri

Coordinates: 36°42′45″N 90°53′26″W

Capps Creek is a stream in Ripley County, in the U.S. state of Missouri. It is a tributary of the Current River.

The stream headwaters arise just west of Missouri Route Y at at an elevation of about 580 feet and it flows west then meanders south to its confluence with the Current at at an elevation of 358 Feet. The confluence is about seven miles northwest of Doniphan.

Capps Creek has the name of Nimrod Capps, an early settler.

== See also ==
- List of rivers of Missouri
