= Ritchey, Missouri =

- Town
- Location of Ritchey, Missouri
- Coordinates: 36°56′39″N 94°11′9″W
- Country: United States
- State: Missouri
- County: Newton

Area
  - Total: 0.050 sq mi (0.13 km^{2})
  - Land: 0.050 sq mi (0.13 km^{2})
  - Water: 0 sq mi (0.00 km^{2})
- Elevation: 1,079 ft (329 m)

Population (2020)
  - Total: 66
  - Density: 1,346.6/sq mi (519.92/km^{2})
- Time zone: UTC-6 (Central (CST))
  - Summer (DST): UTC-5 (CDT)
- FIPS code: 29-62030
- GNIS feature ID: 2396880

Ritchey is a village in Newton County, Missouri, United States. The population was 82 at the 2010 census. It is part of the Joplin, Missouri Metropolitan Statistical Area.

== History ==
Ritchey was originally called Richville, and under the latter name was platted in 1870. The community was named for its founder, Matthew H. Ritchey, who had settled there in 1832. A post office called Ritchey was established in 1871, and remained in operation until 1974.

== Geography ==
Ritchey is located at 36°56′38″N 94°11′9″W (36.943808, -94.185889).

According to the United States Census Bureau, the village has a total area of 0.05 square miles (0.13 km^{2}), all land.

== Demographics ==
Historical population
Census	Pop.	Note	%±
1920	356		—
1930	168		−52.8%
1940	152		−9.5%
1950	137		−9.9%
1960	128		−6.6%
1970	101		−21.1%
1980	126		24.8%
1990	62		−50.8%
2000	76		22.6%
2010	82		7.9%
2020	66		−19.5%
U.S. Decennial Census

=== 2010 census ===
As of the census of 2010, there were 82 people, 32 households, and 22 families living in the village. The population density was 1,640.0 inhabitants per square mile (633.2/km^{2}). There were 38 housing units at an average density of 760.0 per square mile (293.4/km^{2}). The racial makeup of the village was 96.3% White, 2.4% Native American, and 1.2% from two or more races.

There were 32 households, of which 34.4% had children under the age of 18 living with them, 46.9% were married couples living together, 15.6% had a female householder with no husband present, 6.3% had a male householder with no wife present, and 31.3% were non-families. 15.6% of all households were made up of individuals, and 6.2% had someone living alone who was 65 years of age or older. The average household size was 2.56 and the average family size was 3.00.

The median age in the village was 45.5 years. 25.6% of residents were under the age of 18; 2.4% were between the ages of 18 and 24; 22% were from 25 to 44; 24.3% were from 45 to 64; and 25.6% were 65 years of age or older. The gender makeup of the village was 50.0% male and 50.0% female.

=== 2000 census ===
As of the census of 2000, there were 76 people, 35 households, and 22 families living in the town. The population density was 1,487.7 inhabitants per square mile (574.4/km^{2}). There were 36 housing units at an average density of 704.7 per square mile (272.1/km^{2}). The racial makeup of the town was 96.05% White and 3.95% Native American.

There were 35 households, out of which 28.6% had children under the age of 18 living with them, 40.0% were married couples living together, 8.6% had a female householder with no husband present, and 37.1% were non-families. 34.3% of all households were made up of individuals, and 14.3% had someone living alone who was 65 years of age or older. The average household size was 2.17 and the average family size was 2.82.

In the town the population was spread out, with 23.7% under the age of 18, 9.2% from 18 to 24, 19.7% from 25 to 44, 30.3% from 45 to 64, and 17.1% who were 65 years of age or older. The median age was 43 years. For every 100 females, there were 85.4 males. For every 100 females age 18 and over, there were 93.3 males.

The median income for a household in the town was $17,500, and the median income for a family was $26,250. Males had a median income of $16,250 versus $18,750 for females. The per capita income for the town was $13,048. There were no families and 10.1% of the population living below the poverty line, including no under eighteens and 50.0% of those over 64.
