= Pierce City, Missouri =

- City
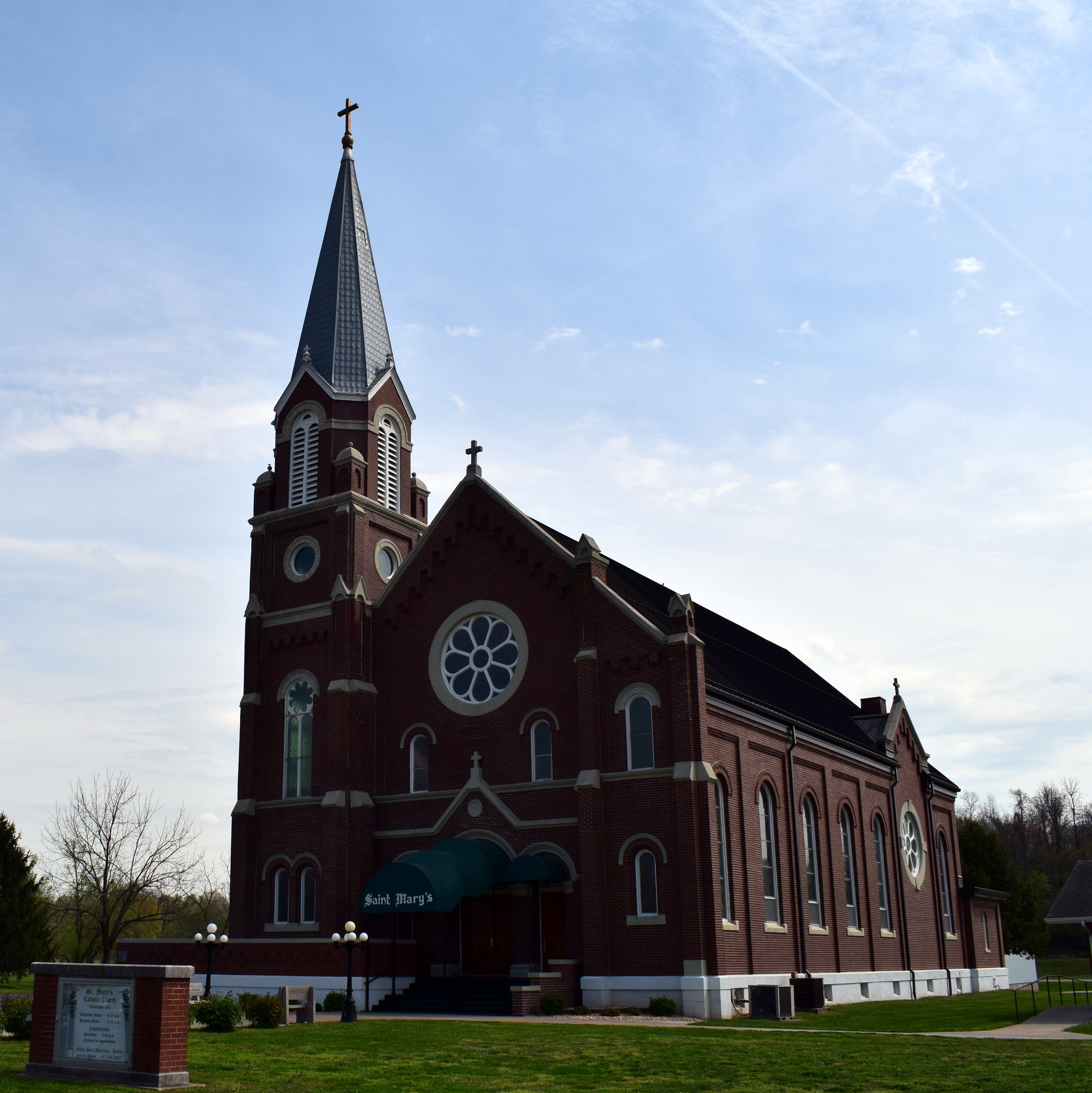
- St. Mary's Catholic Church (Pierce City, Missouri)

- Location of Pierce City, Missouri
- Coordinates: 36°56′48″N 94°0′1″W
- Country: United States
- State: Missouri
- County: Lawrence, Barry

Area
  - Total: 1.29 sq mi (3.35 km^{2})
  - Land: 1.29 sq mi (3.34 km^{2})
  - Water: 0.0039 sq mi (0.01 km^{2})
- Elevation: 1,211 ft (369 m)

Population (2020)
  - Total: 1,251
  - Estimate (2024): 1,272
  - Density: 969.8/sq mi (374.46/km^{2})
- Time zone: UTC-6 (Central (CST))
  - Summer (DST): UTC-5 (CDT)
- ZIP code: 65723
- Area code: 417
- FIPS code: 29-57494
- GNIS feature ID: 2396200
- Website: piercecitymo.com

Pierce City, formerly Peirce City, is a city in southwest Lawrence and northwest Barry counties, in southwest Missouri, United States. The population was 1,251 at the 2020 census. According to the 2024 census population estimate, the town is home to an estimated 1,272 individuals.

== History ==
There was once a small village called St. Martha about two and a half miles west of Pierce City. It was surveyed for William Robert Wild on Section 30, Pierce Township, May 9, 1870. Wild committed suicide there on June 8, 1870. Nothing remains of the village.

=== Founding and spelling ===
Pierce City was laid out in 1870 as a stop on the Atlantic and Pacific Railroad. It was originally spelled Peirce City, named for Andrew Peirce Jr. of Boston, president of the St. Louis–San Francisco Railway. (Note: Eaton in 1916 claimed the Peirce spelling was the error, originating in the founding charter; Eaton erroneously spells Andrew Peirce, Jr's name as Pierce.) The Pierce spelling was used erroneously by the United States Postal Service and adopted officially in the 1930s. A 1982 attempt to revert to Peirce was rejected by the United States Census Bureau.

=== 20th Century ===
==== 1901 lynchings and expulsion ====
On August 19, 1901, a large white mob took three African-American men from jail in Pierce City and lynched them. French and William Godley, and Peter Hampton, were suspects in the murder of a young white woman. Two of the men were quite aged and were unlikely suspects; none had a chance at a trial. These are the only recorded lynchings in Lawrence County.

Unrest continued, and the white mob burned five black homes, and drove "30 families into the woods", affecting the roughly 300 black residents in the town. (It had about 1,000 white residents.) Most of the African Americans lost all their land and property; whites simply took over the empty properties.

This was part of a pattern of violence in southwest Missouri in the early 20th century; there were also large public lynchings in Joplin and Springfield, resulting in many African Americans abandoning the region for less hostile territory. "Monett, Peirce City, Rogers, Ark., and several other towns around here have driven the negros out." By 1910 only 91 African Americans remained in Lawrence County and their numbers continued to decline. The incident has been considered an act of ethnic cleansing.

In reaction, Mark Twain wrote the essay The United States of Lyncherdom, which was published posthumously.

In the 21st century, some descendants of the people who had been driven out of Pierce City threatened to file a lawsuit for the city's failure to protect their families and to recover the value of their families' properties, but none has been filed. There have been other grassroots efforts to acknowledge these crimes and injustices.

=== 21st Century ===
==== May 2003 tornado ====
One of the most notable tornadoes of the May 2003 tornado outbreak sequence was the one that hit in Pierce City. According to reports, nearly all of the buildings in the town were damaged, destroyed, or liable to collapse. Damage was most severe in the historic downtown business district, where approximately 90 percent of the businesses and homes nearby were severely damaged, and they later had to be torn down. A nearby National Guard Armory, regularly used as the town's storm shelter, sustained heavy damage. J. Dale Taunton was killed; he was one of the several dozen people who had fled to the shelter.

But, outside the main path of the tornado, many Pierce City structures, including homes and the Harold Bell Wright Museum, sustained little or no damage. The Pierce City tornado was rated F3 on the Fujita scale.

In 2010, the town annexed property along Route 97 into Barry County to a point just north of U.S. Route 60.

== Geography ==
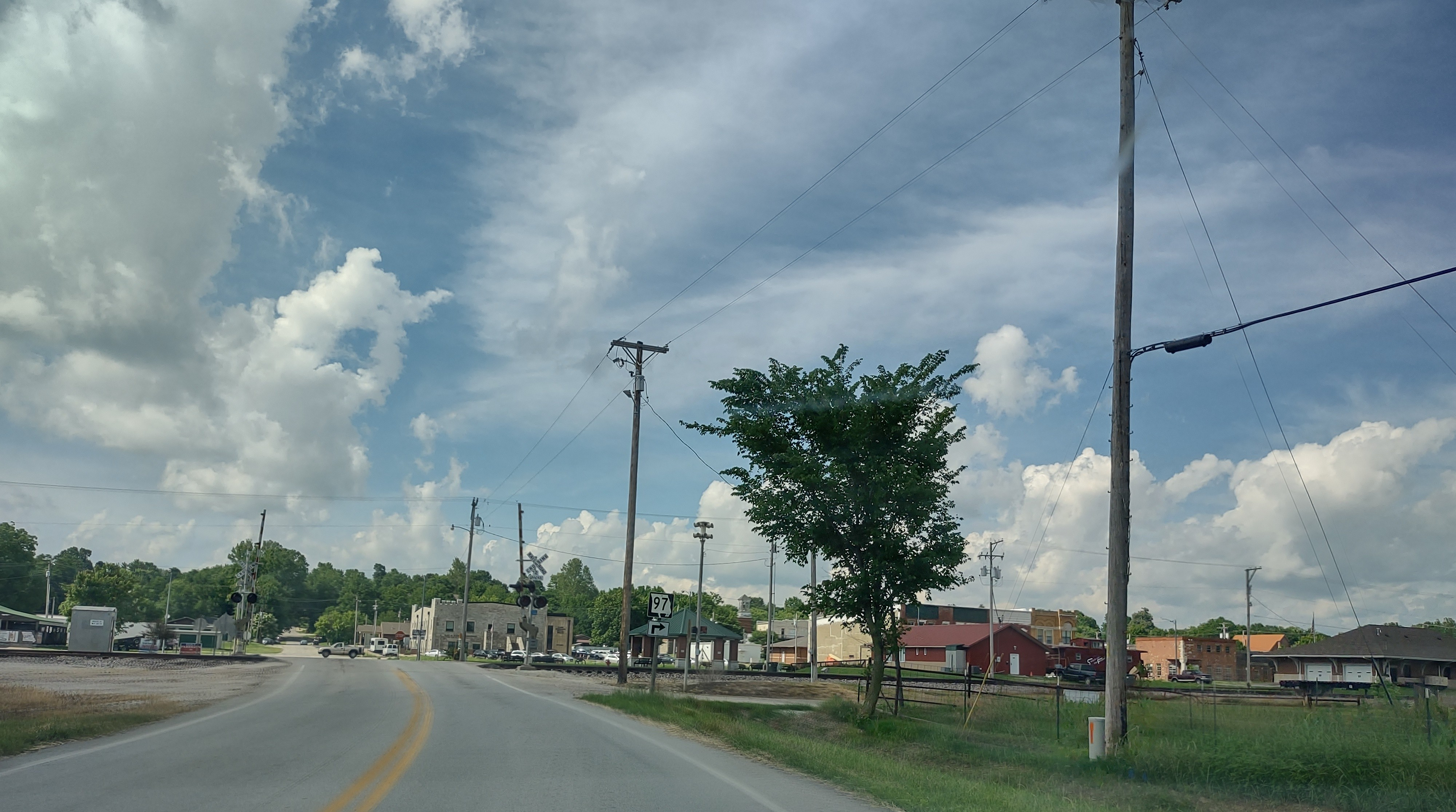
Downtown Pierce City in 2022

Pierce City is located in the southwestern corner of Lawrence County at the intersection of Missouri routes 37 and 97. Monett lies four miles to the east. Clear Creek flows through the city.

According to the United States Census Bureau, the city has a total area of 1.28 square miles (3.32 km^{2}), of which 1.27 square miles (3.29 km^{2}) is land and 0.01 square miles (0.03 km^{2}) is water.

== Demographics ==
Historical population
Census	Pop.	Note	%±
1870	432		—
1880	1,350		212.5%
1890	2,511		86.0%
1900	2,151		−14.3%
1910	2,043		−5.0%
1920	1,476		−27.8%
1930	1,135		−23.1%
1940	1,208		6.4%
1950	1,156		−4.3%
1960	1,006		−13.0%
1970	1,097		9.0%
1980	1,391		26.8%
1990	1,382		−0.6%
2000	1,385		0.2%
2010	1,292		−6.7%
2020	1,251		−3.2%
U.S. Decennial Census

=== 2010 census ===
As of the census of 2010, there were 1,292 people, 538 households, and 343 families residing in the city. The population density was 1,017.3 inhabitants per square mile (392.8/km^{2}). There were 602 housing units at an average density of 474.0 per square mile (183.0/km^{2}). The racial makeup of the city was 95.9% White, 0.8% Native American, 0.2% Asian, 1.8% from other races, and 1.3% from two or more races. Hispanic or Latino of any race were 4.6% of the population.

There were 538 households, of which 33.3% had children under the age of 18 living with them, 45.0% were married couples living together, 13.8% had a female householder with no husband present, 5.0% had a male householder with no wife present, and 36.2% were non-families. 31.8% of all households were made up of individuals, and 13.9% had someone living alone who was 65 years of age or older. The average household size was 2.39 and the average family size was 2.97.

The median age in the city was 37.4 years. 26% of residents were under the age of 18; 8.4% were between the ages of 18 and 24; 24% were from 25 to 44; 25.6% were from 45 to 64; and 16.2% were 65 years of age or older. The gender makeup of the city was 48.5% male and 51.5% female.

=== 2000 census ===
As of the census of 2000, there were 1,385 people, 574 households, and 378 families residing in the city. The population density was 1,133.3 inhabitants per square mile (437.6/km^{2}). There were 646 housing units at an average density of 528.6 per square mile (204.1/km^{2}). The racial makeup of the city was 96.46% White, 0.22% African American, 1.08% Native American, 0.22% from other races, and 2.02% from two or more races. Hispanic or Latino of any race were 1.01% of the population.

There were 574 households, out of which 33.3% had children under the age of 18 living with them, 48.4% were married couples living together, 12.5% had a female householder with no husband present, and 34.0% were non-families. 28.6% of all households were made up of individuals, and 12.9% had someone living alone who was 65 years of age or older. The average household size was 2.41 and the average family size was 2.96.

In the city the population was spread out, with 25.8% under the age of 18, 10.8% from 18 to 24, 28.2% from 25 to 44, 22.1% from 45 to 64, and 13.1% who were 65 years of age or older. The median age was 35 years. For every 100 females, there were 94.0 males. For every 100 females age 18 and over, there were 84.7 males.

The median income for a household in the city was $24,186, and the median income for a family was $34,219. Males had a median income of $23,429 versus $17,857 for females. The per capita income for the city was $12,310. About 18.3% of families and 20.6% of the population were below the poverty line, including 20.8% of those under age 18 and 29.5% of those age 65 or over.

== Education ==
Pierce City R-VI School District operates one elementary school, one middle school, and Pierce City High School.

Pierce City has a public library, a branch of the Barry-Lawrence Regional Library.

St. Mary's Catholic Church was established in 1871 in Pierce City, Missouri. Today, the campus includes the church, school, gymnasium, cafeteria, and pavilion. St. Mary's School was built in 1968. Today, the school includes preschool through 8th grade.

== Culture ==
=== Howdy Neighbor Days ===
Annual fall festival, including vendors, games, rides, raffles, and a beer garden. Dubbed "The Biggest Little Festival in Southwest Missouri" in 2004 by the Missouri Fairs & Festivals Association. It has an annual attendance of approximately 10,000 people from the area and surrounding towns, counties, and states.

== Notable people ==
- Theron C. Bennett - American pianist, ragtime composer, and music publisher.
- Jack Goodman - Missouri House Representative of the 132nd District, Assistant Majority Floor Leader, Senator 29th District, Chief Judge of the Missouri Southern Court of Appeals, Southern District.
- Martha Griffiths - 10-term U.S. House Representative, known as "the mother of the Equal Rights Amendment".
- John F. Williams - WWI First Lieutenant, WWII Major General, reporter and editor of the Kansas City Star, Joplin Globe and the St. Louis Star.
- Harold Bell Wright - American fiction, essays, and nonfiction writer. Author of The Shepherd of the Hills.
- Honestav - Musician

== Representation in Media ==
- A 2007 PBS documentary, Banished: American Ethnic Cleansing, featured the 1901 events in Pierce City and other expulsions of African Americans from Southwest Missouri and other regions.
- Kimberly Harper wrote a history, White Man's Heaven: The Lynching and Expulsion of Blacks in the Southern Ozarks, 1894-1909, University of Arkansas Press (2012), ISBN 1557289840 that explores these and related events.

== See also ==
- List of sundown towns in the United States
