= Newton County, Missouri =

County in Missouri, United States

- County
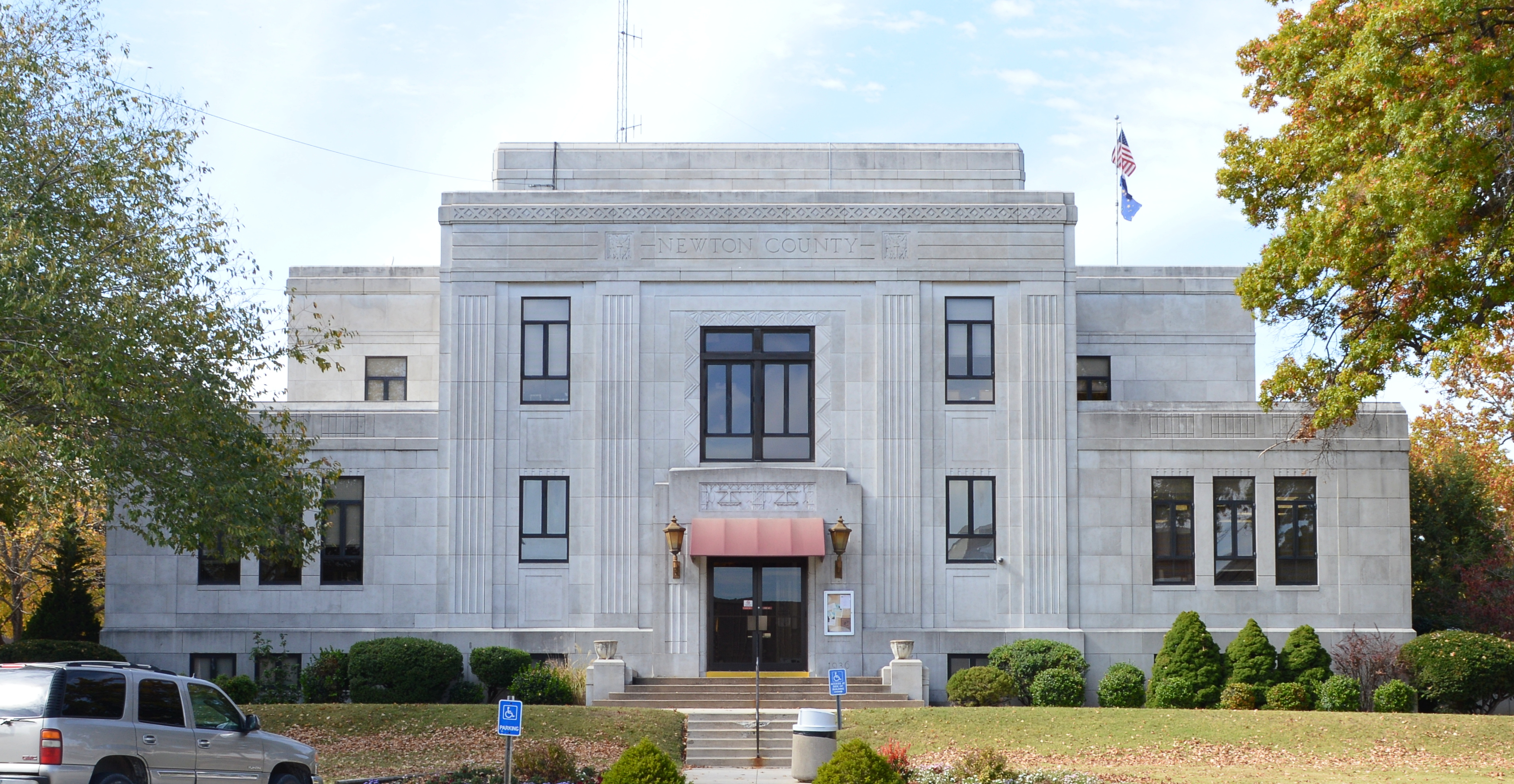
- Newton County Courthouse in Neosho

- Location within the U.S. state of Missouri
- Coordinates: 36°55′N 94°20′W
- Country: United States
- State: Missouri
- Founded: December 15, 1838
- Seat: Neosho
- Largest city: Neosho

Area
  - Total: 627 sq mi (1,620 km^{2})
  - Land: 625 sq mi (1,620 km^{2})
  - Water: 1.8 sq mi (4.7 km^{2}) 0.3%

Population (2020)
  - Total: 58,648
  - Estimate (2025): 62,263 ▲
  - Density: 93.8/sq mi (36.2/km^{2})
- Time zone: UTC−6 (Central)
  - Summer (DST): UTC−5 (CDT)
- Congressional district: 7th
- Website: www.newtoncountymo.com

Newton County is a county located in the southwest portion of the U.S. state of Missouri. As of the 2020 census, the population was 58,648. Its county seat is Neosho. The county was organized in 1838 and is named in honor of John Newton, a hero who fought in the Revolutionary War. Newton County is part of the Joplin metropolitan area.

== Geography ==
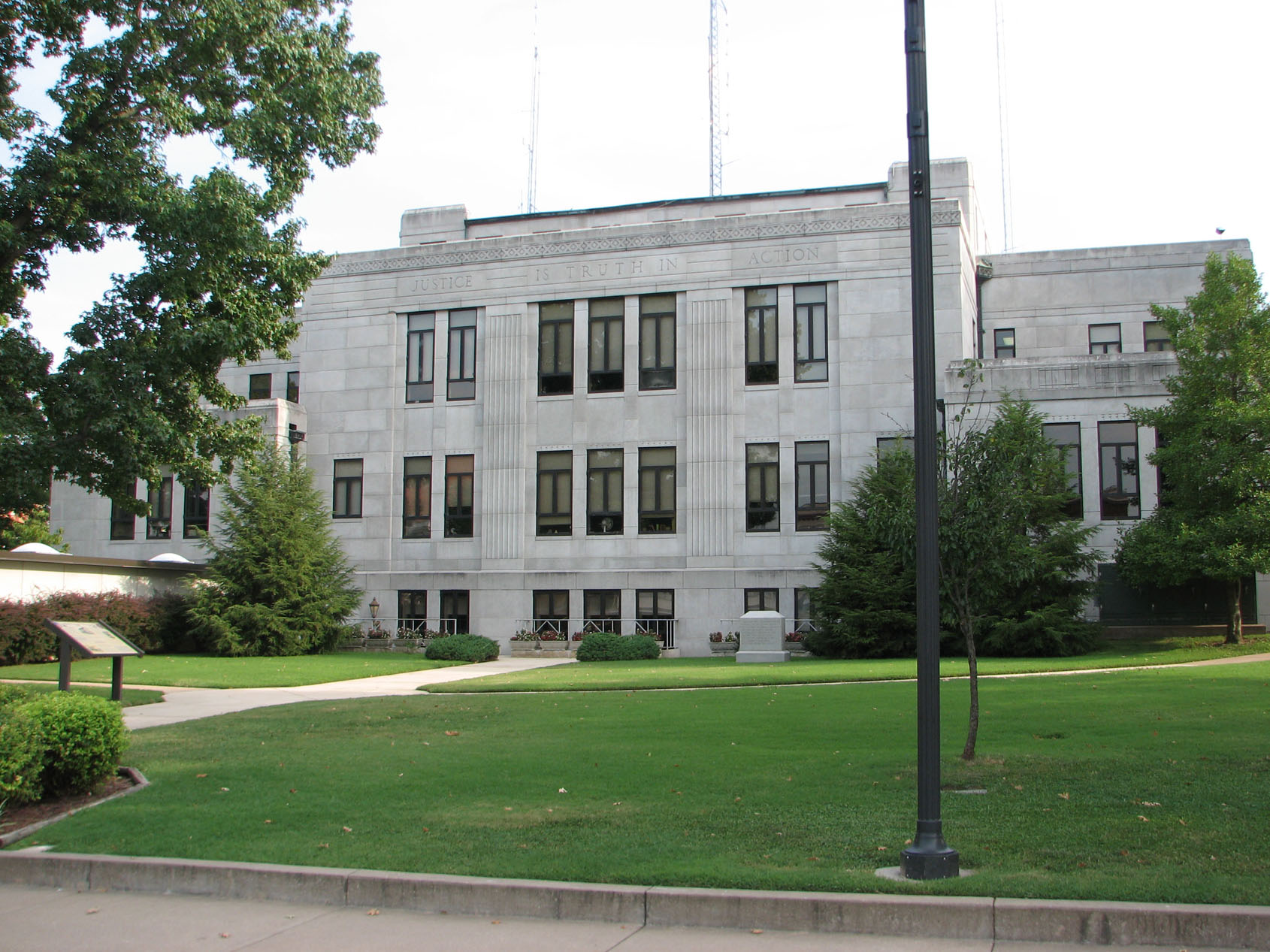
View of the Newton County Courthouse

According to the U.S. Census Bureau, the county has a total area of 627 square miles (1,620 km^{2}), of which 625 square miles (1,620 km^{2}) is land and 1.8 square miles (4.7 km^{2}) (0.3%) is water.

=== Adjacent counties ===
- Jasper County (north)
- Lawrence County (northeast)
- Barry County (southeast)
- McDonald County (south)
- Ottawa County, Oklahoma (west)
- Cherokee County, Kansas (northwest)

=== Rivers and creeks ===
Total river area: 361 acres (1.5 km^{2}); length: 70 miles (110 km)

- Baynham Branch
- Buffalo Creek
- Capps Creek
- Clear Creek
- Dry Valley Branch
- Elm Spring Creek
- Five Mile Creek
- Harrison Creek
- Hickory Creek
- Indian Creek
- Jones Creek
- Lost Creek
- Mason Spring Creek
- Middle Creek
- Rock Branch
- Shoal Creek
- Silver Creek
- Turkey Creek
- Warren Branch
- Willow Creek

=== Major highways ===
- Interstate 44
- Interstate 49
- U.S. Route 60
- U.S. Route 71
- Route 43
- Route 59
- Route 86
- Route 175

=== Transit ===
- Jefferson Lines

=== National protected area ===
- George Washington Carver National Monument

== Demographics ==
Historical population
| Census | Pop. | Note | %± |
|---|---|---|---|
| 1840 | 8,790 | | — |
| 1850 | 4,268 | | −51.4% |
| 1860 | 9,319 | | 118.3% |
| 1870 | 12,821 | | 37.6% |
| 1880 | 18,947 | | 47.8% |
| 1890 | 22,108 | | 16.7% |
| 1900 | 27,001 | | 22.1% |
| 1910 | 27,136 | | 0.5% |
| 1920 | 24,886 | | −8.3% |
| 1930 | 26,959 | | 8.3% |
| 1940 | 29,039 | | 7.7% |
| 1950 | 28,240 | | −2.8% |
| 1960 | 30,093 | | 6.6% |
| 1970 | 32,901 | | 9.3% |
| 1980 | 40,555 | | 23.3% |
| 1990 | 44,445 | | 9.6% |
| 2000 | 52,636 | | 18.4% |
| 2010 | 58,114 | | 10.4% |
| 2020 | 58,648 | | 0.9% |
| 2025 (est.) | 62,263 | ▲ | 6.2% |
U.S. Decennial Census; 1790-1960 1900-1990; 1990-2000 2010

=== Racial and ethnic composition ===
Newton County, Missouri – Racial and ethnic composition Note: the US Census treats Hispanic/Latino as an ethnic category. This table excludes Latinos from the racial categories and assigns them to a separate category. Hispanics/Latinos may be of any race.
| Race / Ethnicity (NH = Non-Hispanic) | Pop 1980 | Pop 1990 | Pop 2000 | Pop 2010 | Pop 2020 | % 1980 | % 1990 | % 2000 | % 2010 | % 2020 |
|---|---|---|---|---|---|---|---|---|---|---|
| White alone (NH) | 39,625 | 42,757 | 48,642 | 50,967 | 47,551 | 97.71% | 96.20% | 92.41% | 87.70% | 81.08% |
| Black or African American alone (NH) | 132 | 173 | 298 | 429 | 523 | 0.33% | 0.39% | 0.57% | 0.74% | 0.89% |
| Native American or Alaska Native alone (NH) | 452 | 937 | 1,143 | 1,286 | 1,351 | 1.11% | 2.11% | 2.17% | 2.21% | 2.30% |
| Asian alone (NH) | 87 | 223 | 166 | 758 | 798 | 0.21% | 0.50% | 0.32% | 1.30% | 1.36% |
| Native Hawaiian or Pacific Islander alone (NH) | x | x | 144 | 488 | 790 | x | x | 0.27% | 0.84% | 1.35% |
| Other race alone (NH) | 37 | 2 | 33 | 40 | 138 | 0.09% | 0.00% | 0.06% | 0.07% | 0.24% |
| Mixed race or Multiracial (NH) | x | x | 1,063 | 1,609 | 3,890 | x | x | 2.02% | 2.77% | 6.63% |
| Hispanic or Latino (any race) | 222 | 353 | 1,147 | 2,537 | 3,607 | 0.55% | 0.79% | 2.18% | 4.37% | 6.15% |
| Total | 40,555 | 44,445 | 52,636 | 58,114 | 58,648 | 100.00% | 100.00% | 100.00% | 100.00% | 100.00% |

=== 2020 census ===
As of the 2020 census, the county had a population of 58,648. The median age was 40.4 years. 23.7% of residents were under the age of 18 and 18.9% of residents were 65 years of age or older. For every 100 females there were 98.7 males, and for every 100 females age 18 and over there were 95.9 males age 18 and over.

The racial makeup of the county was 82.5% White, 0.9% Black or African American, 2.5% American Indian and Alaska Native, 1.4% Asian, 1.4% Native Hawaiian and Pacific Islander, 3.1% from some other race, and 8.2% from two or more races. Hispanic or Latino residents of any race comprised 6.2% of the population.

36.8% of residents lived in urban areas, while 63.2% lived in rural areas.

There were 22,399 households in the county, of which 31.2% had children under the age of 18 living with them and 23.2% had a female householder with no spouse or partner present. About 25.6% of all households were made up of individuals and 11.9% had someone living alone who was 65 years of age or older.

There were 24,570 housing units, of which 8.8% were vacant. Among occupied housing units, 73.1% were owner-occupied and 26.9% were renter-occupied. The homeowner vacancy rate was 1.8% and the rental vacancy rate was 9.4%.

=== 2000 census ===
As of the census of 2000, there were 52,636 people, 20,140 households, and 14,742 families residing in the county. The population density was 84 people per square mile (32 people/km^{2}). There were 21,897 housing units at an average density of 35 units per square mile (14/km^{2}). The racial makeup of the county was 93.26% White, 0.59% Black or African American, 2.23% Native American, 0.32% Asian, 0.28% Pacific Islander, 1.12% from other races, and 2.20% from two or more races. 2.18% of the population were Hispanic or Latino of any race.

There were 20,140 households, out of which 33.10% had children under the age of 18 living with them, 60.50% were married couples living together, 8.80% had a female householder with no husband present, and 26.80% were non-families. 22.70% of all households were made up of individuals, and 9.70% had someone living alone who was 65 years of age or older. The average household size was 2.57 and the average family size was 3.00.

In the county, the population was spread out, with 26.30% under the age of 18, 8.70% from 18 to 24, 27.10% from 25 to 44, 23.80% from 45 to 64, and 14.00% who were 65 years of age or older. The median age was 37 years. For every 100 females, there were 95.60 males. For every 100 females age 18 and over, there were 92.30 males.

The median income for a household in the county was $35,041, and the median income for a family was $40,616. Males had a median income of $30,057 versus $21,380 for females. The per capita income for the county was $17,502. About 8.10% of families and 11.60% of the population were below the poverty line, including 14.20% of those under age 18 and 9.50% of those age 65 or over.

== Education ==
Unified K-12 school districts covering parts of the county, no matter how small, including those which have offices and/or schools in other counties, include:

- Carl Junction R-I School District
- Diamond R-IV School District
- East Newton County R-VI School District
- Joplin School District
- McDonald County R-I School District
- Neosho R-V School District
- Pierce City R-VI School District
- Sarcoxie R-II School District
- Seneca R-VII School District
- Wheaton R-III School District

There is also a single elementary school district, Westview C-6 School District.

=== Public schools ===
- East Newton County R-VI School District – Granby
  - Granby Elementary School (K–04)
  - Triway Elementary School (K–04) – Stella
  - Granby Junior High School (05–08)
  - Triway Junior High School (05–08)
  - East Newton County High School (09–12)
- Diamond R-IV School District – Diamond
  - Diamond Elementary School (PK–04)
  - Diamond Middle School (05–08)
  - Diamond High School (09–12)
- Neosho R-V School District – Neosho
  - Field Early Childhood Center (PK)
  - Benton Elementary School (K–04)
  - Central Elementary School (K–04)
  - George Washington Carver Elementary School (K–04)
  - Goodman Elementary School (K–04)
  - South Elementary School (K–04)
  - Westview Elementary School (K–07)
  - Neosho Middle School (05–06)
  - Neosho Junior High School (07-08)
  - Neosho High School (09–12)
  - Central Campus Alternative High School (09-12)
- Seneca R-VII School District – Seneca
  - Seneca Elementary School (PK–05)
  - Iva E. Wells Middle School (06–08)
  - Seneca High School (09–12)

=== Private schools ===
- Neosho (K–12) – Churches of Christ
- Neosho (PK–12) – Pentecostal Ozark Christian Academy
- Racine Apostolic Christian School – Racine (PK–12) – Pentecostal
- Trinity Learning Center [Neosho, Missouri] (K-12) [Protestant]

=== Post-secondary ===
- Crowder College – Neosho. A two-year junior college.

=== Public libraries ===
- Neosho/Newton County Library

== Communities ==
=== Cities ===
- Diamond
- Fairview
- Granby
- Joplin (mostly in Jasper County)
- Neosho (county seat)
- Seneca

=== Villages ===
- Cliff Village
- Dennis Acres
- Grand Falls Plaza
- Leawood
- Loma Linda
- Newtonia
- Redings Mill
- Ritchey
- Saginaw
- Shoal Creek Drive
- Shoal Creek Estates
- Silver Creek
- Stark City
- Stella
- Wentworth

=== Unincorporated communities ===
- Aroma
- Belfast
- Berwick
- Boulder City
- Christopher
- Gregg
- Hornet
- Jolly
- June
- McElhany
- Monark Springs
- Pepsin
- Racine
- Spring City
- Spurgeon
- Sweetwater
- Talmage City
- Tipton Ford
- Wanda

=== Townships ===
- Benton
- Berwick
- Buffalo
- Dayton
- Five Mile
- Franklin
- Granby
- Marion
- Neosho
- Newtonia
- Seneca
- Shoal Creek
- Van Buren
- West Benton

== Politics ==
=== Local ===
The Republican Party completely controls politics at the local level in Newton County. Republicans hold every elected position in the county.

Newton County, Missouri

Elected countywide officials
| Assessor | Cheryle Perkins | Republican |
| Auditor | Matt Major | Republican |
| Circuit Clerk | Patty Krueger | Republican |
| County Clerk | Tami Owens | Republican |
| Collector | Jessica Crawford | Republican |
| Commissioner (presiding) | Daniel Swem | Republican |
| Commissioner (district 1) | Mark Knight | Republican |
| Commissioner (district 2) | Ron Wallace | Republican |
| Coroner | Ronnie Jones | Republican |
| Prosecuting Attorney | William Lynch | Republican |
| Public Administrator | Joy Williams | Republican |
| Recorder | Jennifer Childers | Republican |
| Sheriff | Matt Stewart | Republican |
| Surveyor | Jerry Wood | Republican |
| Treasurer | Gina Rodriguez | Republican |

=== State ===
Past Gubernatorial Elections Results
| Year | Republican | Democratic | Third Parties |
|---|---|---|---|
| 2024 | 79.07% 22,795 | 18.95% 5,464 | 1.98% 571 |
| 2020 | 77.89% 22,031 | 20.12% 5,692 | 1.99% 562 |
| 2016 | 71.92% 19,123 | 24.85% 6,607 | 3.23% 860 |
| 2012 | 57.88% 14,483 | 39.48% 9,880 | 2.64% 661 |
| 2008 | 61.85% 15,570 | 36.29% 9,134 | 1.86% 468 |
| 2004 | 75.23% 17,935 | 23.75% 5,662 | 1.02% 242 |
| 2000 | 66.05% 13,917 | 32.18% 6,780 | 1.77% 373 |
| 1996 | 58.15% 10,445 | 39.60% 7,114 | 2.25% 404 |

Newton County is divided into four districts in the Missouri House of Representatives, all of which are held by Republicans.

- District 159 — Bill Lant (R) Pineville) Consists of the communities of Fairview, Newtonia, Racine, Ritchey, Seneca, Stark City, and Stella.

Missouri House of Representatives — District 159 — Newton County (2016)
| Party | Candidate | Votes | % | ±% |
|---|---|---|---|---|
| Republican | Bill Lant | 5,209 | 100.00% | |

Missouri House of Representatives — District 159 — Newton County (2014)
| Party | Candidate | Votes | % | ±% |
|---|---|---|---|---|
| Republican | Bill Lant | 2,362 | 100.00% | |

Missouri House of Representatives — District 159 — Newton County (2012)
| Party | Candidate | Votes | % | ±% |
|---|---|---|---|---|
| Republican | Bill Lant | 4,719 | 100.00% | |

- District 160 — Bill Reiboldt (R-Neosho). Consists of the communities of Diamond, Granby, Loma Linda, Neosho, Wentworth, and part of Silver Creek.

Missouri House of Representatives — District 160 — Newton County (2016)
| Party | Candidate | Votes | % | ±% |
|---|---|---|---|---|
| Republican | Bill Reiboldt | 15,228 | 100.00% | |

Missouri House of Representatives — District 160 — Newton County (2014)
| Party | Candidate | Votes | % | ±% |
|---|---|---|---|---|
| Republican | Bill Reiboldt | 7,434 | 100.00% | |

Missouri House of Representatives — District 160 — Newton County (2012)
| Party | Candidate | Votes | % | ±% |
|---|---|---|---|---|
| Republican | Bill Reiboldt | 14,061 | 100.00% | |

- District 161 — Bill White (R-Joplin). Consists of the communities of Leawood, Redings Mill, and parts of Joplin and Silver Creek.

Missouri House of Representatives — District 161 — Newton County (2016)
| Party | Candidate | Votes | % | ±% |
|---|---|---|---|---|
| Republican | Bill White | 3,339 | 100.00% | +23.10 |

Missouri House of Representatives — District 161 — Newton County (2014)
| Party | Candidate | Votes | % | ±% |
|---|---|---|---|---|
| Republican | Bill White | 1,501 | 76.90% | −23.10 |
| Democratic | Charles Shields | 451 | 23.10% | +23.10 |

Missouri House of Representatives — District 161 — Newton County (2012)
| Party | Candidate | Votes | % | ±% |
|---|---|---|---|---|
| Republican | Bill White | 3,326 | 100.00% | |

- District 162 — Charlie Davis (R-Webb City). Consists of a small part of the southeastern section of Joplin.

Missouri House of Representatives — District 162 — Newton County (2016)
| Party | Candidate | Votes | % | ±% |
|---|---|---|---|---|
| Republican | Charlie Davis | 27 | 100.00% | |

Missouri House of Representatives — District 162 — Newton County (2014)
| Party | Candidate | Votes | % | ±% |
|---|---|---|---|---|
| Republican | Charlie Davis | 5 | 100.00% | |

Missouri House of Representatives — District 162 — Newton County (2012)
| Party | Candidate | Votes | % | ±% |
|---|---|---|---|---|
| Republican | Charlie Davis | 24 | 100.00% | |

All of Newton County is a part of Missouri's 32nd District in the Missouri Senate and is represented by Ron Richard (R-Joplin).

Missouri Senate — District 32 — Newton County (2014)
| Party | Candidate | Votes | % | ±% |
|---|---|---|---|---|
| Republican | Ron Richard | 11,397 | 100.00% | |

=== Federal ===
U.S. Senate — Missouri — Newton County (2016)
| Party | Candidate | Votes | % | ±% |
|---|---|---|---|---|
| Republican | Roy Blunt | 18,598 | 69.89% | +11.31 |
| Democratic | Jason Kander | 6,691 | 25.14% | −10.76 |
| Libertarian | Jonathan Dine | 573 | 2.15% | −3.37 |
| Green | Johnathan McFarland | 295 | 1.11% | +1.11 |
| Constitution | Fred Ryman | 454 | 1.71% | +1.71 |

U.S. Senate — Missouri — Newton County (2012)
| Party | Candidate | Votes | % | ±% |
|---|---|---|---|---|
| Republican | Todd Akin | 14,574 | 58.58% | |
| Democratic | Claire McCaskill | 8,933 | 35.90% | |
| Libertarian | Jonathan Dine | 1,374 | 5.52% | |

All of Newton County is included in Missouri's 7th Congressional District and is represented by Eric Burlison(Republican) in the U.S. House of Representatives.

U.S. House of Representatives — Missouri's 7th Congressional District — Newton County (2016)
| Party | Candidate | Votes | % | ±% |
|---|---|---|---|---|
| Republican | Billy Long | 19,497 | 74.15% | +0.14 |
| Democratic | Genevieve Williams | 5,790 | 22.02% | +0.67 |
| Libertarian | Benjamin T. Brixey | 1,008 | 3.83% | −0.77 |

U.S. House of Representatives — Missouri's 7th Congressional District — Newton County (2014)
| Party | Candidate | Votes | % | ±% |
|---|---|---|---|---|
| Republican | Billy Long | 9,646 | 74.01% | +2.87 |
| Democratic | Jim Evans | 2,782 | 21.35% | −3.75 |
| Libertarian | Kevin Craig | 600 | 4.60% | +0.84 |
| Write-In | Write-ins | 5 | 0.04% | +0.04 |

U.S. House of Representatives — Missouri's 7th Congressional District — Newton County (2012)
| Party | Candidate | Votes | % | ±% |
|---|---|---|---|---|
| Republican | Billy Long | 17,499 | 71.14% | |
| Democratic | Jim Evans | 6,174 | 25.10% | |
| Libertarian | Kevin Craig | 924 | 3.76% | |

United States presidential election results for Newton County, Missouri
| Year | Republican | | Democratic | | Third party(ies) | |
| Year | No. | % | No. | % | No. | % |
|---|---|---|---|---|---|---|
| 1888 | 1,787 | 41.28% | 1,969 | 45.48% | 573 | 13.24% |
| 1892 | 1,883 | 40.24% | 1,978 | 42.26% | 819 | 17.50% |
| 1896 | 2,174 | 41.27% | 3,029 | 57.50% | 65 | 1.23% |
| 1900 | 2,673 | 46.33% | 2,877 | 49.87% | 219 | 3.80% |
| 1904 | 2,647 | 48.60% | 2,296 | 42.15% | 504 | 9.25% |
| 1908 | 2,620 | 44.99% | 2,725 | 46.80% | 478 | 8.21% |
| 1912 | 1,470 | 27.23% | 2,421 | 44.84% | 1,508 | 27.93% |
| 1916 | 2,929 | 45.70% | 3,158 | 49.27% | 322 | 5.02% |
| 1920 | 5,541 | 55.90% | 4,078 | 41.14% | 293 | 2.96% |
| 1924 | 4,592 | 50.96% | 3,970 | 44.06% | 449 | 4.98% |
| 1928 | 7,054 | 67.77% | 3,269 | 31.41% | 85 | 0.82% |
| 1932 | 4,806 | 39.36% | 7,224 | 59.17% | 179 | 1.47% |
| 1936 | 6,437 | 47.87% | 6,929 | 51.52% | 82 | 0.61% |
| 1940 | 8,064 | 56.14% | 6,256 | 43.55% | 44 | 0.31% |
| 1944 | 6,985 | 57.47% | 5,146 | 42.34% | 23 | 0.19% |
| 1948 | 5,820 | 50.86% | 5,598 | 48.92% | 25 | 0.22% |
| 1952 | 8,577 | 62.71% | 5,070 | 37.07% | 30 | 0.22% |
| 1956 | 7,792 | 58.49% | 5,529 | 41.51% | 0 | 0.00% |
| 1960 | 9,010 | 61.34% | 5,678 | 38.66% | 0 | 0.00% |
| 1964 | 6,660 | 45.00% | 8,139 | 55.00% | 0 | 0.00% |
| 1968 | 7,343 | 52.87% | 5,064 | 36.46% | 1,481 | 10.66% |
| 1972 | 10,701 | 71.38% | 4,291 | 28.62% | 0 | 0.00% |
| 1976 | 7,142 | 49.94% | 7,045 | 49.26% | 114 | 0.80% |
| 1980 | 10,515 | 63.11% | 5,621 | 33.74% | 526 | 3.16% |
| 1984 | 11,709 | 71.69% | 4,623 | 28.31% | 0 | 0.00% |
| 1988 | 10,617 | 64.36% | 5,798 | 35.15% | 82 | 0.50% |
| 1992 | 8,804 | 47.64% | 5,987 | 32.40% | 3,688 | 19.96% |
| 1996 | 10,067 | 55.66% | 5,840 | 32.29% | 2,178 | 12.04% |
| 2000 | 14,232 | 67.25% | 6,447 | 30.46% | 483 | 2.28% |
| 2004 | 17,187 | 71.95% | 6,564 | 27.48% | 138 | 0.58% |
| 2008 | 17,637 | 69.42% | 7,450 | 29.32% | 319 | 1.26% |
| 2012 | 18,181 | 72.17% | 6,425 | 25.50% | 587 | 2.33% |
| 2016 | 20,553 | 76.67% | 4,990 | 18.61% | 1,264 | 4.72% |
| 2020 | 22,120 | 77.87% | 5,818 | 20.48% | 467 | 1.64% |
| 2024 | 22,923 | 78.78% | 5,867 | 20.16% | 307 | 1.06% |

== See also ==
- National Register of Historic Places listings in Newton County, Missouri
- List of counties in Missouri
- Joplin Metropolitan Area
