= Muriel Battle =

American educator (1930–2003)

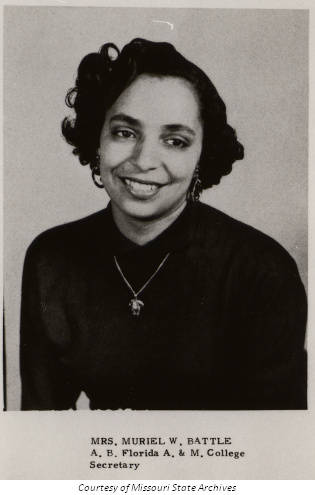
- Portrait of Mrs. Muriel W. Battle
- Born: January 23, 1930; Mobile, Alabama
- Died: March 2, 2003 (aged 73); Columbia, Missouri
- Spouse: Eliot Battle

Muriel Battle (1930–2003) was a former teacher and principal in Columbia, Missouri.

She was the first African-American principal and the first female assistant superintendent for secondary education in Columbia, Missouri. She helped end racial segregation for the school district. Years after her death, Battle High School was named after her.

== Early life ==
She was born on January 23, 1930 in Mobile, Alabama. Her parents were Hirshall Williams and Juanita Williams.

== Move to Columbia ==
After Brown v. Board of Education, Columbia Public Schools phased out many courses at Douglass high school and students had to take these courses at Hickman.

In 1956, Mrs Battle and her husband took jobs at Douglass and moved to Columbia. Where she taught social studies. At the time Douglass was Columbia's high school and elementary school for black kids.

Around the same time under the policy that no black teachers would be fired due to integration, Battle's husband was transferred to full-time guidance counselor at Hickman High School. During this time she became teacher of Social Studies and World Geography at West Junior High in 1961, Where she became the school's first black teacher.

== Assistant principal ==
On May 7, 1962, the board discontinued the junior high at Douglass, resulting in students going to West Junior High School.

Battle became assistant principal of the school in 1975. A year later she graduated from the University of Missouri and earned her master's degree in secondary administration.

In 1973, she became the leader for the People to People Program, and became its area director in 1982.

== Later years and death ==
Battle retired in 1996 and died on March 2, 2003.

== Recognition and legacy ==
Battle gained an honorary doctorate from Lincoln University. She also received an Outstanding University of Missouri Alumni Award from the University of Missouri College of Education.

She was named a Missouri Pioneer in Education by the Missouri Department of Education. Battle High School was named after her.
