= Columbia Area Career Center =

Location
- Columbia, Missouri; United States
- Coordinates: 38°54′13.5″N 92°20′13.06″W

Information
- Type: vocational school
- School district: Columbia Public Schools
- Superintendent: Dr. Jeff Klein
- Director: Dr. Brandon Russell
- Website: career-center.org

The Columbia Area Career Center is a vocational school in Columbia, Missouri operated by Columbia Public Schools providing career and technical education. Students are mainly from Columbia's four public high schools: Hickman High School, Douglass High School, Rock Bridge High School, and Battle High School. The Career Center also serves students from Columbia Independent School, Christian Fellowship School, Heritage Academy, Tolton High School, and Centralia High School. The school also offers professional and community education for adults. It is located just north of Rock Bridge High School in South Columbia.
