= Mercy Park, Joplin, Missouri =

Municipal park in Missouri, U.S.

Coordinates: 37°03′37″N 94°31′45″W

Mercy Park is a 16-acre park in Joplin, Missouri, built on the former site of St. John's Regional Medical Center land donated by Mercy Hospital Joplin. It was created as a result of the recovery efforts following the May 2011 tornado, with St. John's parent organization Mercy deeding the land to the city, after they decided to build a new facility south of Joplin of the Hearnes Boulevard exit of I-44. It sits adjacent to the new Mercy Chapel Park and reconstructed Cunningham Park; the area is known as "ground zero" for the tornado touchdown and heaviest of storm damage.

The park holds restrooms, two shelters, picnic tables, a pond and fountain, a mural, and some trails. A sculpture walk was incorporated in 2018 as part of a private community-driven fundraising effort. The park was funded as part of a large Federal Community Development Block Grant awarded to the city after the disaster. In 2018, a vigil was held here for the Disappearance of Sarah Burton.

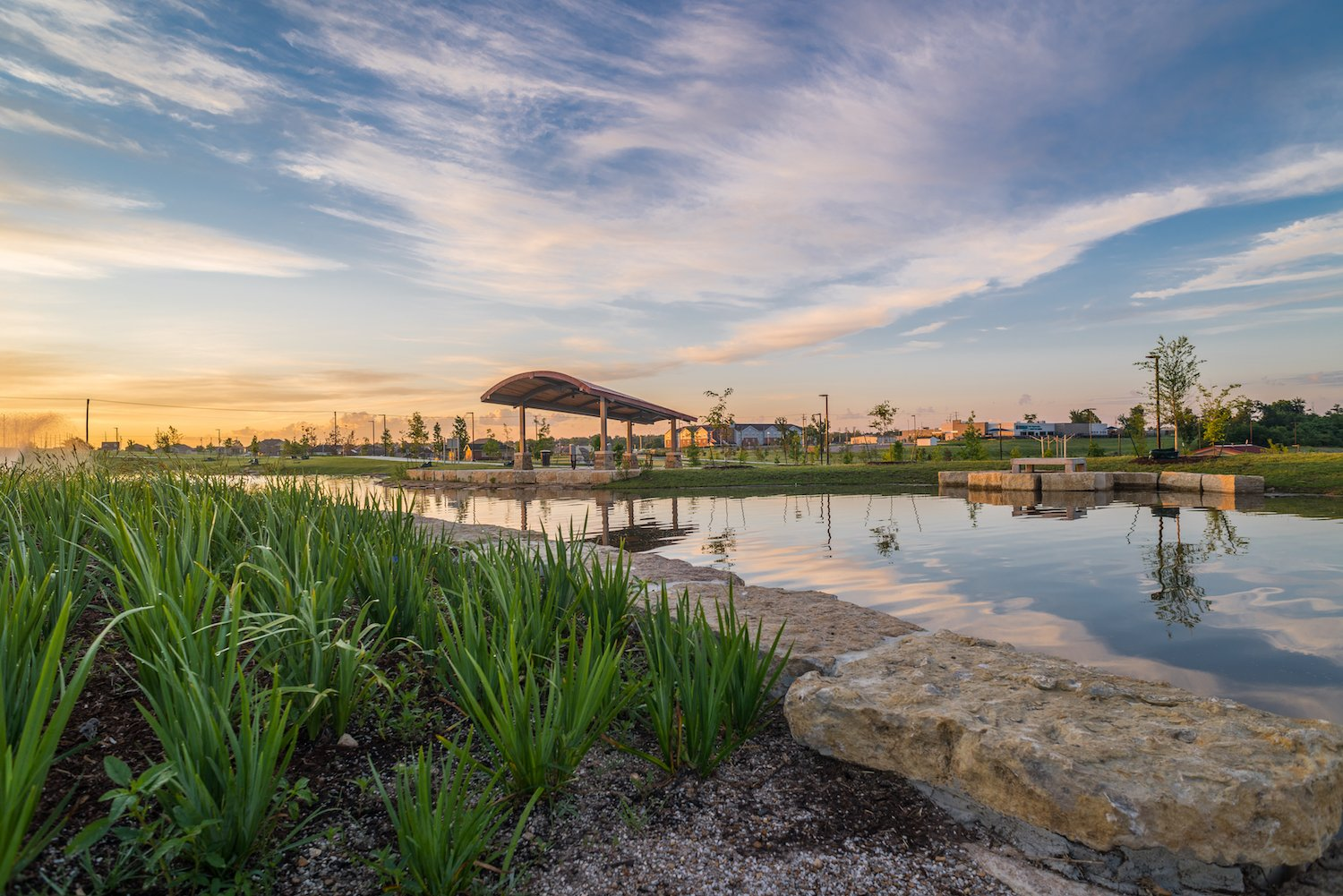
Mercy Park
