= Disappearance of Sarah Burton =

2018 unsolved disappearance

Sarah Elizabeth Burton
- Born: February 22, 1990 (age 36)
- Disappeared: July 16, 2018
- Status: Missing for 8 years, 4 months and 3 days

Sarah Elizabeth Burton (born February 22, 1990 – disappeared July 16, 2018) is an American woman who disappeared from Joplin, Missouri. She was last seen near 10th Street and Rex Avenue after a friend dropped her off after midnight in Northwest Joplin. Her mother reported her missing on July 20, 2018. Burton had been involved in a car accident on July 11, 2018.

== Investigation ==
The Joplin Police Department and Federal Bureau of Investigation have received numerous tips and leads regarding her disappearance.

In April 2019, new leads led investigators to a property in Newton County, Missouri, where several agencies executed a drug search warrant. Credible information received by the Joplin Police Department prompted authorities to conduct a thorough search of the property, including its outbuildings, using search and rescue dogs. Newton County Sheriff Chris Jennings confirmed that items were removed from the property during the search, although he did not disclose their nature or connection to the case. After the search of the home, investigators returned to the property and began searching a pond with divers and search and rescue dogs. Around that time, Newton County Sheriff Chris Jennings noted that no definitive evidence had been found in the pond.

The FBI is offering a reward of up to $10,000 for information leading to the arrest and conviction of those responsible for Sarah's disappearance.

== Family and community efforts ==
Friends and family organized a Facebook page, Bring Sarah Burton Home. In September, 2018, a candlelight vigil titled "Lighting the Way Home for Sarah" was held at Mercy Park in Joplin.

== Personal life ==
She has two children. Burton struggled with addiction to methamphetamine. She is reported to have been a victim of a violent crime following high school.

She had a history of legal troubles, including time in prison in 2010. At the time of her disappearance, she was free on bail for charges of drug possession, trafficking in stolen identities, and stealing a motor vehicle.

== See also ==
- List of people who disappeared mysteriously (2000–present)
