= Hickman High School =

David H. Hickman High School

Location
- 1104 North Providence Road; Columbia, Missouri 65203; United States; 38°57′48″N 92°19′53″W

Information
- Type: Public Secondary/High school
- Motto: "Keep Smiling"
- Established: 1889 (old building); 1927 (Current building)
- School district: Columbia Public Schools
- Superintendent: Jeff Klein
- Principal: Virginia Tate
- Faculty: 126.15 (FTE)
- Grades: 9–12
- Enrollment: 2,007 (2024-2025)
- Student to teacher ratio: 15.91
- Language: English
- Campus type: Urban
- Colors: Purple and Gold
- Fight song: "On Sons of Hickman"
- Athletics: Baseball; Basketball; Cheerleading; Cross County; Football; Golf; Marching Band; Show Choir; Soccer; Softball; Swimming and Diving; Dance; Tennis; Track and Field; Volleyball; Wrestling; Karate; E-Sports
- Athletics conference: CMAC
- Mascot: Kewpie
- Rival: Jefferson City High School; Rock Bridge High School; Battle High School
- Newspaper: The Purple & Gold
- Yearbook: The Cresset
- Schedule: Block
- Website: Hickman Website

David Henry Hickman High School (commonly Hickman or HHS) is a public secondary school in Columbia, Missouri, United States, serving students in grades 9–12. Built in 1927, it is the oldest of four high schools in the Columbia Public Schools, with admission based primarily on the locations of students' homes. Hickman is also one of the largest high schools in Missouri and has perennially strong academic, athletic, and arts programs.

There are a number of notable alumni from Hickman including a Missouri Governor, several U.S. and State members of congress, Frederick Chapman Robbins (who won the 1954 Nobel Prize for medicine), Wal-Mart founder Sam Walton, and Kenneth Lay (founder and former CEO of the now-bankrupt Enron Corporation). Hickman is a two-time Blue Ribbon School and a Missouri Gold Star School.

In 2022, Hickman had nineteen National Merit Finalists, the most of any school in Missouri. Hickman has more than double the number of Presidential Scholars than any other public or private high school in Missouri.

Hickman was constructed in 1927 on the country estate of Missouri legislator and educator David Henry Hickman, next to what was then U.S. Route 40. The school was built to replace the earlier Columbia High School and carried over many of its traditions including the mascot and yearbook. Today, the school is accredited with distinction by the Missouri Department of Elementary and Secondary Education as well as the North Central Association of Colleges and Schools. Hickman's mascot is the Kewpie.

== History ==
Public secondary education began in Columbia during the 1880s with the founding of Columbia High School in 1889 at the intersection of Eighth Street and Rogers.

As many high schools were at this point in history, CHS offered a two-year course of study. In 1895, it was increased to three, and again in 1896 to four. Extracurricular activities in 1898 included a literary society, choral union, orchestra, and debate team. Sports teams were present, but were not yet funded by the district. Overcrowding caused the demolition of the old school and the construction of a new three-story structure at the same site. The new building included the district's first gymnasium, and the first athletics and music teacher were hired.

1912 saw the first edition of the school yearbook, the Cresset. The school mascot, the Kewpie, appeared for the first time in the Cresset associated with the basketball team "...whose loyalty to the school and to the Kewpie motto, ‘Keep Smiling,’ has won the State Championship". During World War I, students were excused to work as part of the war effort, and the German Club was removed from the extracurricular offerings.

In the 1920s, Columbia was experiencing continued growth, and the district decided to build a new high school on the edge of town on the newly built U.S. Route 40. David Henry Hickman donated part of his estate which had formerly held grandstands and a track for horse racing. David H. Hickman High School opened in 1927, and the old high school became Jefferson Junior High School, which later became Jefferson Middle School. The Great Depression of the 1930s caused the school district to operate with a deficit for the first time; however, the high school building was expanded using loans and the Works Progress Administration.

In this decade, the school's wrestlers captured three state championships, and Hickman created a marching band. The 1940s and World War II brought a new level of international awareness to Hickman, and classes in international relations, aeronautics, and home nursing were added. In 1944, the operetta "Tune In" was performed, and there have been yearly musical productions since. In 1948, the tradition of requiring sophomores to wear beanies was restored.

The 1950s saw the end of racial segregation in Columbia, and Hickman was integrated with Fredrick Douglas High School. The influx of students saw a building boom, and class rooms for special education, adult classes, vocational work, and laboratories were built. A new gymnasium was built in 1955 and a swimming pool added in 1968.

In 1961, the tradition of sophomore beanies was ended. David Wheeler became Hickman's first presidential scholar in 1964, the first year of the program. Hickman saw four state championships in three sports in the 1960s. Rock Bridge High School was opened in 1973 as the second high school in Columbia, and competitive women's sports were offered for the first time 1970s. The 1980s saw much national recognition; Hickman was given the Blue Ribbon Award for 1984–85.

Hickman filled Missouri's quota of Presidential Scholars in 1988. In 1994–95, Hickman was once again given the Blue Ribbon Award, and four additional Presidential Scholars were named in the decade; Hickman now had a total of 12 Presidential Scholars, more than any public school in Missouri. 1994 was also the year that Hickman beat Rock Bridge 43-42 in triple overtime in what some called the Game of the Century as crosstown rivals met for only the second time in history, and their first football matchup since 1981. Nearly 10,000 spectators witnessed the 10/21/94 event despite an official capacity of about 2,500. Computer labs were created in the late 1980s, and the Columbia Aeronautics Space Association (CASA), a realistic space simulation program, was founded. In the 1990s, Hickman won state championships in baseball, women's swimming, men's track, men's cross country, and men's tennis.

2001 saw a presidential scholar each of the first four years and the development of a master plan for Hickman's campus. A bond-issue was passed, and the renovations repairing the oldest parts of the school occurred. A large commons space, a main office, and language labs were added in 2003. In 2005, the oldest part of the building including the auditorium was restored, and the remainder of the school air-conditioned. State championships in football, baseball, and track were won in 2005.

=== 1987 Presidential visit ===
On March 26, 1987, President Ronald Reagan made a special trip to Columbia, Missouri to speak at the National Governors' Association-Department of Education Conference as well as Fairview Elementary and David H. Hickman High School. Hickman had received the Department of Education's Secondary School Recognition Award, and with six students having been named Presidential Scholars since 1964, Hickman ranked in the top five percent of the nation's schools. In his address to the assembled students and faculty at Hickman, President Reagan praised the school's academic quality, saying, in part, "If America is to be what it should be in the 21st century, then it's going to need a lot of schools, good schools. And Hickman, I'm pleased and proud to tell you, is one of the best." During the presentation, President Reagan was made an honorary Kewpie and given a school sweatshirt as a gift.

== Academics ==
Hickman is known for excellent academic programs. The school has had more Presidential Scholars named than any other public high school in the State of Missouri. A 2006 article in Newsweek, "What makes a high school great", listed Hickman within the top 5% of high schools in the nation.

In 2007, the school won the Siemens Foundation and College Board Award for Advanced Placement, meaning that Hickman leads the nation in AP participation and performance. Its literary journal, the Hickman Review, has received several prestigious national awards. Hickman was recognized as a Blue Ribbon School for 1984–85 and 1994–95.

== Campus ==
Hickman High School was built on U.S. Route 40 on the country estate of David H. Hickman in 1927. The school has since expanded dramatically in size from its original two-story structure.

Today, the campus is bordered by Interstate 70 Business Loop, Seventh Street, Wilkes Boulevard, and Providence Road. A major addition in 1956 doubled the size of the school adding classrooms, a gymnasium, and a swimming pool. The 1970s saw the construction of a Fine Arts Building and a continuation of classroom additions.

In 2003, a commons area, office space, and language labs were added, and in 2005, the remainder of the school was air-conditioned and remodeled to match the original architecture.

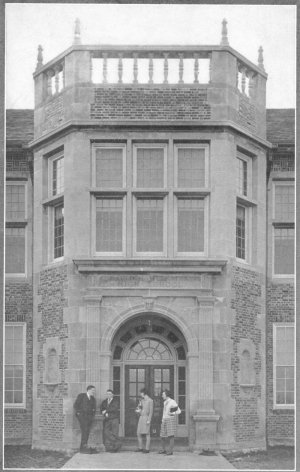
The original entrance to the High School in 1928.

The Hickman Campus is host to several events throughout the year including the Missouri All-State Band Auditions.

== Extracurricular activities ==
=== Fine arts ===
The Hickman High School Marching Band is one element of a comprehensive band program. The marching band begins practicing in July with summer music rehearsals and concludes its season with the end of the football season. The marching band comprises more than 200 students enrolled in band classes at Hickman High School as well as several Hickman students that are members of the color guard. As the marching band "activity" continues to evolve, the Hickman band remains active as it consistently participates in performances at home football games, local parades, and region-wide marching festivals. Throughout its recent history of participation in marching band festivals, the band has been a consistent finalist and has been awarded outstanding caption recognition in all captions, including Outstanding Musical Performance, Outstanding Visual Performance, Outstanding Percussion, Outstanding Color Guard, Outstanding Drum Majors, and Outstanding Soloist. Most recently, the band placed 2nd overall at the Fort Zumwalt North River City Marching Festival. The Hickman Marching Band has traveled to Florida and most recently to Honolulu, Hawaii (June, 2005) as they presented performances in the King Kamehameha Parade and a special performance at the USS Missouri Memorial. The band repeated this trip in June 2008 and in June 2011.

The Hickman High School Concert Band Program currently consists of Wind Ensemble (1st hour, A Day), Symphonic Winds (4th Hour, B Day), Symphonic Winds (3rd Hour, B Day), and Concert Band (3rd hour, A Day). Each year, the Wind Ensemble (membership by individual audition) and the Concert Bands present many performances for the community including home concerts and special events; in addition, the combined bands participate in the State Large Ensemble Festival and consistently receive Superior ratings. The Hickman High School Wind Ensemble has been selected to perform for the Missouri Music Educators Association four times(2001, 2005, 2022, and 2025).

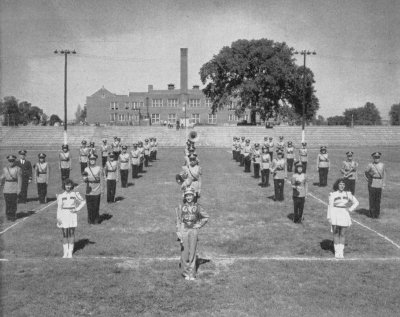
The Hickman marching band c. 1948.

The Hickman High School Jazz Program is an extracurricular activity available to student enrolled in Hickman band classes. The jazz program comprises one "big band" of standard jazz instrumentation as well as 2 jazz “labs” consisting of any instrument. The jazz bands begin morning rehearsals at the conclusion of the marching band season and continue throughout the school year. Both jazz bands present 2 concerts per year, as well as participating in 3–4 jazz festivals per year.

The Hickman High School string orchestra is composed of the finest string players in the school and meets 1st hour. The band and string programs complement each other, combining into a full orchestra for major works such as Carmina Burana, Verdi's Requiem, and tribute concerts for composers such as Leonard Bernstein. In 2007, the orchestra traveled to San Antonio, Texas to perform at the Heritage Music Festival. They received 3 first-place awards.

Choral Music at Hickman has been a part of the total education experience since the first choral music class was included in the curriculum of Columbia High School for the 1899–1900 school year. Since then, choirs at Hickman have received numerous accolades and awards for excellence in choral performance at state, regional, national, and international festivals. These include a first-place finish at the International Youth and Music festival, Vienna, Austria, a performance with the internationally renowned Canadian Brass, a performance with former Missouri Governor, Senator, and U.S. Attorney General John Ashcroft, and performances at state and regional music educator conferences. Hickman choirs have toured extensively throughout Europe, visiting Germany, Austria, Switzerland, Spain, Ireland, Wales, Scotland, England, and most recently, Italy and the Vatican. Notable performances include: Salzburger Dom in Salzburg, Austria; Notre Dame Basilica in Montreal, Canada; the National Cathedral in Washington, D.C.; St. Mark's Basilica in Venice, Italy; St. Francis Basilica in Assisi, Italy; and St. Peter's Basilica in the Vatican City.

Musical theatre has been a staple of Hickman High School for decades, having produced All-School musicals as far back as the 1940s. The musical productions class first appeared with the Victor Herbert musical The Red Mill, which opened as it had in 1946 when Hickman first produced it. Since that time, Musical Productions has grown into a graduated program, with three levels of study. Each course is designed to improve the student's skill level and grow students into confident and well-rounded performers.

=== Athletics ===
==== Football ====
Football at Columbia High School, Hickman's predecessor, started in 1894. With the exception of the Spanish influenza epidemic of 1918, it appears football has been played every year at Columbia Hickman High School since that initial 1894 year. The Hickman Kewpie football team has won the Class 6 MSHSAA title twice, in 1974 and 2004.

===== Providence Bowl =====
The Hickman-Rock Bridge series is called the Providence Bowl in reference to Providence Road, a major north–south street in Columbia that connects the two schools. The Providence Bowl meeting had taken place at the University of Missouri's Faurot Field from 2004 to 2012, but due to scheduling issues, moved to the schools' fields starting in 2013. Since 2004, Rock Bridge leads the series 18–6. Arguably the biggest meeting in the series was in the 2012 playoffs, when Hickman defeated Rock Bridge at home 10-7 in overtime.

===== Jefferson City - Hickman Rivalry =====
Hickman has played Jefferson City at least once a year in football since 1919, with the series starting in 1911. As of 2023, Jefferson City leads the series 62–53–4. This rivalry is the second oldest football rivalry west of the Mississippi River.

==== Other Sports ====
The first state wrestling tournament for high school wrestlers in the state of Missouri was held in 1931 at the Rothwell gym on the University of Missouri campus. Hickman High School competed in this first tournament under the instruction of Coach Fowler Young. Young was also a varsity wrestler for the MU Tigers at the same time he coached the Hickman team. This first Hickman team became the first wrestling team to be crowned State Champs. Coach Fowler coached the team in 1932 and 1933. The team placed 2nd and 8th respectively.

The first lacrosse program in the Columbia area was started in 1998 and was composed of players from Hickman High School and Rock Bridge High School. The schools split ways in 2002, and the first Hickman High School men's lacrosse team was formed.

=== Academy of Rock ===
The Academy of Rock was founded in late January 2004 to plan and execute a “Battle of the Bands” between Hickman and its Columbia rival, Rock Bridge, but soon grew to encompass several other enterprises.

Since its inception, the Academy of Rock has hosted nine Battles of the Bands, three at Hickman High School and two at a local rock-and-roll venue, The Blue Note. These four events raised a total of nearly $7,000 to support what sponsor Overeem calls “demotic music” (in other words, music created by and for the masses). Each Battle has pitted four Hickman bands against four Rock Bridge bands. The winning band not only has the privilege of hosting a summer benefit concert at the Blue Note but being staked to recording time in a local studio. The four summer benefits have raised a total of over $3,000 for VH1's Save the Music Foundation, Columbia's community radio station KOPN, the Muscular Dystrophy Association, the Voluntary Action Center of Columbia, the University of Missouri's Thompson Center for Autism and Other Neurodevelopmental Disorders, and the effort to rebuild Joplin, Missouri, after the 2011 tornado. In addition, Academy of Rock-sponsored bands have also raised over $2,000 to assist in rebuilding after both the Sri Lanka and New Orleans disasters, and the group co-sponsored a fund-raiser for Hurricane Katrina survivors that netted nearly $27,000. In 2013, The IRA, the winning band in that year's Battle, opted to donate its recording proceeds to the Central Missouri Humane Society.

Besides the Battle of the Bands, the Academy of Rock also sponsors, mans, and programs KWPE 98.3 FM, the school radio station (home to Rock Therapy); curates the American Roots Music Listening Library in the school media center, which has been funded largely by the Assistance League of Mid-Missouri; partners with Columbia art theater Ragtag Cinemacafe for “The Academy of Rock Showcase,” which gives high school bands the opportunity to hone their chops in front of audiences and make money; partners with University of Missouri radio station KCOU in a “Take-over Program", during which eight pairs of Hickman DJs operate the college station for 12 to 16 hours in one- to two-hour shifts; sponsors a monthly music documentary series in the school's Little Theatre; and coordinates a live performance series that has featured free unplugged concerts by artists ranging from nationally known acts like The Drive-By Truckers (March 2005) and The Hold Steady (December 2006) to cult artists like former X co-lead singer-songwriter Exene Cervenka (see video),and Baby Gramps to local Missouri musicians like Witch's Hat, The F-Bombs, Bockman, and Cary Hudson.

In 2008, University of Missouri student Chad LaRoche shot a brief documentary about the club to help those who are interested understand the club more clearly: Part 1 and Part 2 of the documentary are available on YouTube. A further technological aspect of the club spawned during that year was the "Rock Therapy" podcast , which featured Battle of the Band recordings, raw tracks from the concert series showcases, and the sponsor's eccentric, lo-fi forays into the world of pop music.

April 2009 brought further recognition for the club: the national-award-winning regional magazine Missouri Life featured the club in an article by John Hendel . As soon as the 2009–2010 school year was under way, the Academy of Rock brought Pacific Northwestern punk-garage legends The Pierced Arrows (formerly Dead Moon) to the Little Theater stage for an October 13 concert-and-Q&A. In the spring of the same school year, in collaboration with the Missouri Arts Council, Theater NXS, and MO Blues Society, the club presented northern Mississippi bluesman and Fat Possum recording artist Robert Belfour in two workshops involving over 100 students. Also, again aided by a grant from the Assistance League of Mid-America, the club augmented its existing media center CD collection with a selection of American classical music.

The Academy of Rock initiated a new program during the 2011-2012 school year: the "Local Music Showcase". This program was designed to expose Hickman students to musicians in their own community and facilitate conversations through performances and question-and-answer sessions that could serve to inspire students to pursue their own futures in music. The opening performance in the series, on November 10, 2011, featured Moonrunner ; on February 9, 2012, Columbia "indyground" rapper Dallas held court. 2012-2013 was a very quiet year for the Academy of Rock, though, true to its mission, it initiated some new programs: a Sunday Night Showcase series at Columbia's The Bridge , which featured concerts by Volatile, Space, Time, and Beauty, Ross Menefee, and The Pound Game, and a music-lesson scholarship, in partnership with The Columbia Academy of Music. The scholarship offers $250 worth of lessons to one underclassman boy and one underclassman girl per year. The club also procured two grants, one each from the Assistance League of Mid-Missouri and the Hickman PTSA, to expand the school's CD library

== Traditions ==
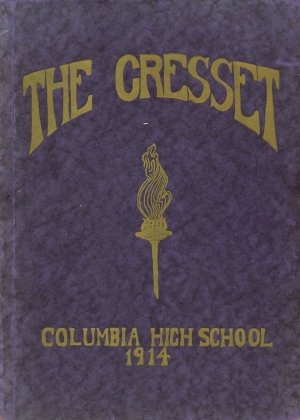
The 1914 Cresset

=== The Cresset ===
The Cresset is the Hickman yearbook. It has been a yearly tradition for the high school since 1912. Most of the past editions of the yearbook are available for viewing at the Hickman Media Center (Library) by the high schoolers as well as the general public (with special permission from the librarian); however, the Hickman Media Center is missing the 1913, 1914, 1916, 1917, and 1936 editions (although a few reside at the Columbia Public Schools Central Office), and several other existing editions are badly worn and in need of replacement. Donations to the Hickman archives of old Cressets in good condition are therefore requested and can be made by contacting the Hickman Media Center staff. All of the Cressets can now be viewed online.

=== Hickman Tunnels ===
Many legends, both confirmed and unconfirmed, exist concerning the Hickman Tunnels. The most popular legend is that there is a tunnel from somewhere inside the school traveling to Jefferson Middle School. Many versions say that the tunnel is in a state of complete or partial disrepair, others state that it is still intact. The tunnels were still intact 2015–2016 school year. Hickman's school newspaper, 'The P&G', featured photos of the tunnels.

=== Mascot ===
The Kewpie doll has been the mascot of the school for the last 100 years. Hickman is the only known school in the world with a Kewpie as its mascot. The name dates back to the basketball season of 1913 -1914 at what was known then as Columbia High School. Apparently, the school secretary owned a Kewpie doll, as they were popular figurines then, and she kept it on her desk. At one of the first basketball games in December 1913 she placed her Kewpie doll in the center of the court, and the entire game was played around it without it being broken. This was somewhat remarkable since the dolls were very fragile. Because it survived the game and brought a victory, it was thereafter considered the good luck mascot. You can see a picture of that Kewpie doll beneath Sam Church in the team photograph in the 1914 school annual. That team had a straight claim to the state championship of Missouri for 1914 as they had an undefeated season. Coincidentally Sam Church was the Captain of the 1914 Kewpie basketball team and was the first Kewpie to letter in four sports. The school annual, the Cresset of 1914 was the first annual to display a Kewpie. In addition to the doll between Sam's feet in the team picture a drawing of a Kewpie appeared as a dedication to the team. The dedication said, “To the Basket Ball Team of 1914, whose loyalty to the school and to the Kewpie motto, ‘Keep Smiling’, has won the State Championship, this volume of the Cresset is dedicated.” The only previous known mascot for Columbia High School, which became David Henry Hickman High School in 1927, was the Trojans. It is referenced in the first school annual, the Cresset of 1912. Columbia/Hickman High School has graduated over 35,000 “Kewpies” in its history and they are still proud to be called “Kewpies!”

=== School song ===
The school song was written by Mr. C. M. Stookey, a music instructor at Hickman High School in 1944. It was originally called Kewpies on the March. The song is featured on the third page of the 1950 Cresset.

== Notable alumni ==
- Gary Anderson (born 1961), NFL player
- Yvonne Anderson, basketball player and Olympian who represented Serbia
- Simon Barrett, filmmaker
- Matt Bartle, Missouri state senator
- Nick Cave, sculptor, dancer, and performance artist
- J'den Cox, Olympic bronze medal wrestler
- John Douglas, NFL player
- Gerry Ellis (born 1957), NFL player
- Jane Froman, singer and actress
- Ken Griffin, organist
- Kate Hanley, Virginia politician
- Jeff Harris, Missouri state representative
- Marcella Hayes, first African American woman pilot in the U.S. Armed Forces
- Peter Hessler, writer and journalist, MacArthur Fellowship
- Saritha Komatireddy (born 1984 or 1985), federal prosecutor and former chief of staff of the U.S. Drug Enforcement Administration
- Bill Hume, cartoonist
- Kenneth Lay, CEO of Enron during the Enron scandal
- Rob LaZebnik, writer and co-executive producer for The Simpsons
- Leo Lewis, Minnesota Vikings football player
- Claire McCaskill, U.S. Senator
- Scott Murphy, New York businessman and politician
- Bob Musgrave, baseball player
- Sara Parker Pauley, director of the Missouri Department of Conservation
- Frederick Chapman Robbins, 1954 Nobel Prize winner
- Frances V. Rummell, author and educator
- Blake Tekotte (born 1987), baseball player (Chicago White Sox)
- Sam Walton, founder of Walmart and Sam's Club
- James "Bud" Walton, co-founder of Wal-Mart
- Markus Wiechel, Swedish M.P.

== Notable faculty ==
- Kyle Hawkins, first openly gay man coach of collegiate men's team sport
- Jerome Sally, NFL player
