= Frances V. Rummell =

Educator and columnist (1907–1969)

- Born: Frances Virginia Rummell; November 14, 1907; Brookfield, Missouri
- Died: May 11, 1969 (aged 61); Los Angeles, California
- Education: University of Missouri
- Occupation: Writer • Teacher
- Relatives: Jo Markwyn (niece), Peter Rummell (nephew)
- Writing career
- Pen name: Diana Fredericks, Diana Frederics, Ann Crockett
- Language: English
- Genre: Lesbian Autobiography
- Notable works: Diana: A Strange Autobiography (1939); Aunt Jane McPhipps and Her Baby Blue Chips (1960)

Frances V. Rummell (November 14, 1907 - May 11, 1969) was an educator and columnist who is known posthumously as the author and publisher of the first explicitly lesbian autobiography in the United States in which two women end up happily together.

== Early life ==
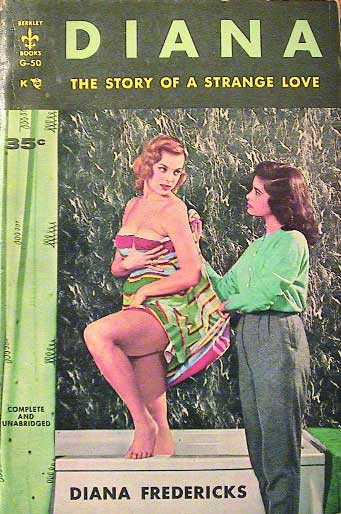
1939 Autobiography written by Rummell (under the pseudonym Diana Fredericks)

Frances Virginia Rummell was born in Brookfield, Missouri on November 14, 1907. She was the daughter of Lander Warfield Rummell and Minnie Alice Roberts. She was the second youngest of five children, though her sister Maurine died before Frances was born. She grew up in Missouri and lived with her paternal grandmother, Josephine McCoy, her parents, two brothers, and her grandmother's housekeeper. Her father, Lander, owned a clothing store until he committed suicide in 1918, when Frances was only ten years old. He died by taking poison.

In 1917, Rummell moved to Columbia, Missouri with her grandmother, mother, older brother, and younger sister. She attended Hickman High School in Columbia. According to her book Diana: A Strange Biography it was at 16 when she first realized she was a lesbian by reading a medical book.

== Education ==
Rummell graduated from the University of Missouri. Her master's thesis was "The status of women in the plays of Molière.”

After college, Rummell traveled to Paris to study at the Sorbonne in 1931. Supposedly, on her return she smuggled a copy of Ulysses into the U.S.

== Career ==
Rummell taught French at Stephens College in the 1930s.

In 1939, Rummell published her book Diana: A Strange Autobiography using the pseudonym Diana Fredericks. The autobiography details one young woman’s, Diana, discovery of her lesbian sexuality. The book ends positively, with Diana and her female partner happily together. This sympathetic and positive-portrayal of lesbianism was shocking for the time in which it was first published. The autobiography was published with a note saying, "The publishers wish it expressly understood that this is a true story, the first of its kind ever offered to the general reading public". However, Rummell's niece Jo Markwyn said in an interview that she believes Diana: A Strange Autobiography is not purely autobiographical: "The general family background is similar, but rather than having three brothers, she had two brothers and a younger sister...I don’t think it’s an autobiography. I think it is a novel based upon her life." During her life, Rummell was never known for being the author of Diana.

The book has been translated into several languages. A new, commented German edition was published in 2023.

Rummell gave up teaching in 1940 and moved to Beverly Hills, California to work as a non-fiction education writer, using her own name. She was a contributor to The Rotarian, Good Housekeeping, and The Saturday Evening Post.

In 1960, Rummell published an illustrated novel, Aunt Jane McPhipps And Her Baby Blue Chips, written under her own name.

== Personal life ==
While working as an educator, Rummell sometimes traveled to New York City. In the summer of 1939, she met Eleanor Roosevelt. Roosevelt wrote of their meeting in her "My Day" column.

The PBS show History Detectives had an episode on Diana: A Strange Autobiography, in which the host, Tukufu Zuberi, attempted to unearth the author of Diana. This episode seems to be the first time it was made publicly known that Diana Fredericks was a pseudonym of Frances V. Rummell. Also in the episode, Zuberi found Rummell’s niece, Jo Markwyn. Markwyn has fond memories of her aunt, saying “She was a very bright woman. I think she enjoyed life. She was a big personality. She came into the room, you knew she was there. I was very fond of her.”

Markwyn, when asked if Rummell was a lesbian, said: “Yes. I do know. And she was. My parents never said anything about it. But, observation told me when I got old enough, and I know of a couple of relationships she was in that were long term.”

Rummell passed away in California in 1969.
