= Mercy Hospital Joplin =

- The new hospital as seen in June 2026

Geography
- Location: 100 Mercy Way, 64804, Joplin, Missouri, United States
- Coordinates: 37°02′12″N 94°30′34″W

Organization
- Care system: Private
- Type: Community
- Affiliated university: Kansas City University of Medicine and Biosciences

Services
- Emergency department: Level II for Trauma certification
- Beds: 100+

History
- Founded: 1896
- Demolished: 2011 (original campus)

Links
- Website: mercy.net/practice/mercy-hospital-joplin
- Lists: Hospitals in Missouri

Mercy Hospital Joplin, formerly known as St. John's Regional Medical Center, is a hospital in Joplin, Missouri, USA. The hospital is famous for suffering devastating damage in the 2011 Joplin tornado. The original storm-ravaged building was demolished in 2013. Following a succession of temporary structures, the hospital reopened in a new location in 2015.

== History ==
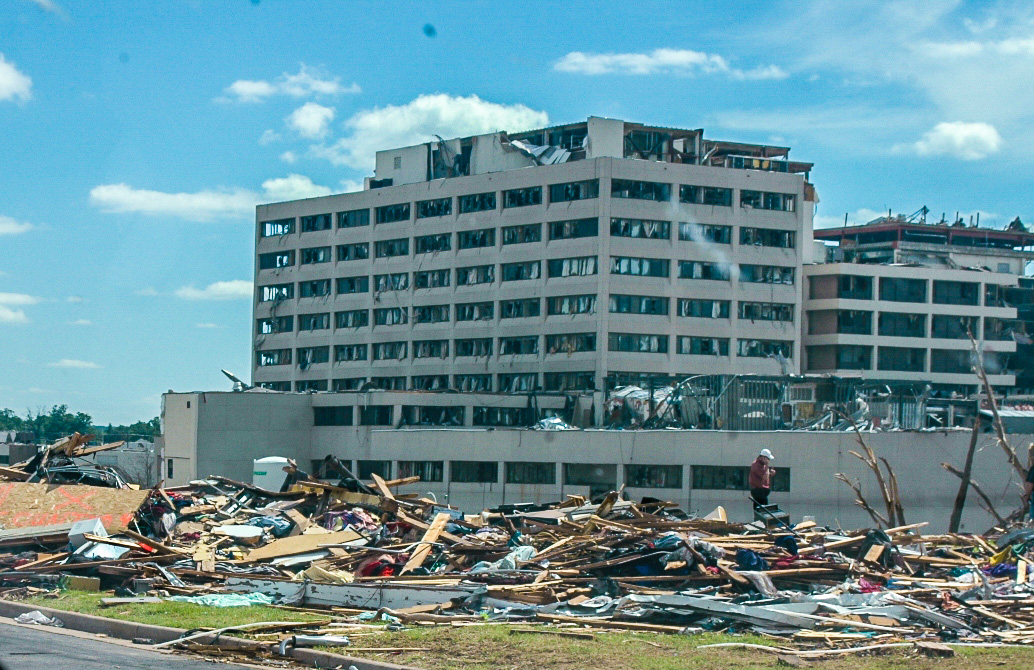
St. John's Regional Medical Center after the May 22 Joplin tornado

According to the hospital, it was founded on October 24, 1896, by Mother Mary Sullivan, and the Sisters of Mercy, founded in Ireland for this work around the world. Appoline A. Blair is sometimes credited as playing a philanthropic role in the founding of St John's. The facility was expanded in 1968 to include two connecting buildings of seven and nine floors.

On May 22, 2011, the hospital was seriously damaged by a tornado from the tornado outbreak sequence of May 21–26, 2011. Five patients were killed inside the hospital due to electrical failure and surviving patients were evacuated from the health facility, which sustained severe damage to its envelope and interior rendering it completely non-functional despite no damage to its structural frame. Because of the extent of this damage, it was later decided that the old hospital was to be torn down and rebuilt in a new location. In the immediate aftermath of the tornado, the Missouri National Guard established a field hospital at Joplin Memorial Hall.

Mere hours after the tornado hit Joplin, the Missouri Medical Assistance Team (DMAT) started working to create a plan to help the survivors. The following Wednesday, DMAT deployed their 8,000 square foot field hospital to temporarily replace the destroyed hospital. Six days after the tornado, on May 29, 2011 St. John's medical staff gave medical treatment to their community in the BLU-MED field hospital. This temporary hospital is now the home of the Kansas City University-Joplin College of Osteopathic Medicine.

The existing hospital was completely non functional after the tornado which tore through the interior, destroyed the HVAC systems and caused severe internal flooding. The complex was subsequently demolished as a result. Temporary buildings were constructed nearby for work to continue supporting the community. One week after the tornado, St. John's announced they would rebuild, though now under the name of its parent organization, Mercy. Mercy rebuilt the hospital at Interstate 44 and Hearnes Boulevard; it opened in 2015, replacing the facility destroyed by the tornado, which has been replaced by Mercy Park, deeded to the city of Joplin. There is also an auxiliary facility on the northeast side. The new hospital was specially constructed to be tornado-resistant, with specially designed windows rated for 250 mph winds, a reinforced concrete hardened exterior and a rigidly braced steel moment frame system with composite steel and reinforced concrete floor slabs.
