= Rock Bridge High School =

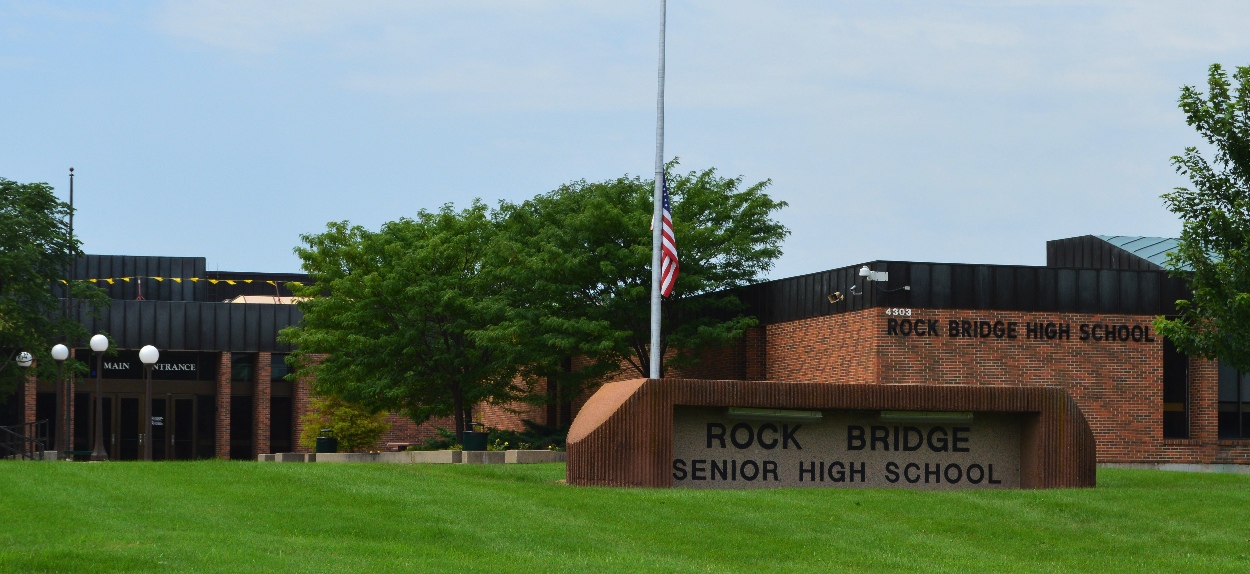

Location
- 4303 S. Providence Road; Columbia, Missouri 65203; United States

Information
- School type: Public high school
- Established: 1973
- School district: Columbia Public Schools
- Superintendent: Jeff Klein
- Principal: Jacob Sirna
- Staff: 107.88 (on an FTE basis)
- Grades: 9–12
- Enrollment: 2,056 (2023–24)
- Student to teacher ratio: 19.06
- Colors: Green and gold
- Fight song: The Victors
- Athletics conference: CMAC
- Team name: Bruins
- Newspaper: Southpaw
- Yearbook: Flashback
- Feeder schools: Ann Hawkins Gentry Middle School, John Warner Middle School
- Online News: BearingNews
- Website: rbhs.cpsk12.org

Rock Bridge High School is a public high school located in southern Columbia, Missouri, United States. The school serves grades 9 through 12 and is one of four High Schools in Columbia Public Schools. It is located next to the Columbia Area Career Center. The mascot is the Bruin Bear.

== History ==
Due to the crowding of David H. Hickman High School towards the end of the 1960s and the increasing population of Columbia in the 1970s, the Columbia Board of Education decided to form a new high school. The board bought 42 acres (170,000 m^{2}) of land in the southern portion of the city and started the construction of the new high school. The name "Rock Bridge" was chosen because of the school's proximity to the natural rock bridge at Rock Bridge Memorial State Park.

Construction started in 1969 on the original portion of the building, which consisted of 18 classrooms and one office area in the present-day east wing of the building. The school was planned to open in 1971, but funding issues pushed back construction of the second phase of the building. As such, this original portion sat unused for a year or two while the second portion was not yet complete. Construction started on the second portion in early 1972, which added the "Main Commons", another office area, the library, the gymnasium, and a few specialty classrooms underneath that area. In September 1973, with the completion of the second portion, Rock Bridge was considered "complete enough" to open and had a class of 583 students, mostly sophomores and juniors. This high school was the second centrally air-conditioned school built in Columbia after Oakland Junior High School north of town. However, the air-conditioning system was prone to failure and the school was difficult to keep cool in warm weather due to the fact that the windows were not designed to be opened. Later additions to the building included some windows that were able to be opened.

The school had a Sonitrol security system which enabled remote 24/7 security monitoring.

In 1974, the planetarium was completed with a capacity of nearly 90 people, which features a state-of-the-art star ball. A full-dome projection system was later added with the advent of newer technology.

In 1979, the west wing opened, which adopts the same basic design of the original 1971 building but with a finished basement. This added about ten general-purpose classrooms, as well as science, art, and band rooms; in turn, this would provide the school a then-total of about 40 classrooms. A north wing similar in design to the east and west wings was also proposed as part of the original master plan but was never built. However, three new science classrooms and a performing arts center were added in 1992. Enrollment reached 1,000 in the 1995–96 school year.

In 1980, a Career Center was opened north of the school that taught computer programming in COBOL and RPG-II on an IBM System/34 computer. Courses in data entry were also available.

In the early 1990s, three science classrooms north of the west wing and the Performing Arts Center near the commons area were added.

In 2000, a large addition opened between and north of the east and west wings and portions of the existing building, especially the west wing, were renovated, effectively doubling the size of the building. This project added twenty-five general-purpose classrooms, seven science classrooms, expanded performing arts facilities, a new media center, three new computer labs (since converted to classrooms), and several new office spaces. In January 2013, a second gymnasium was added after the district added ninth-graders to the high schools. The area under the auxiliary gym added other athletic facilities, making room for four new classrooms elsewhere in the building.

== Academics ==
The school offers 18 Advanced Placement courses and a multitude of honors classes available to students. RBHS has weighted and unweighted grade point averages. Ranked #2,856 in the nation by US News, Rock Bridge has a very decent academic standings. According to Niche, 30% of students at Rock Bridge are enrolled in at least 1 AP Class, and roughly 73.5% of students planning on college at Rock Bridge plan to stay in the county. Niche also states that 93% of students graduate Rock Bridge.

== Mascot ==
Rock Bridge High's mascot is the bruin bear. The school's original band director, Phil Wood, wanted the mascot of the school to be a troll. He ordered custom marching band uniforms that were green with a large white bib with a troll on the front of them. His decision was overridden and the mascot was officially made the bruin bear. Unable to return the uniforms, the band used them for a number of years. The band members unofficially referred to themselves as the Marching Munchkins.

== Athletics ==
The school offers a variety of sports. Fall sports include cross country, football, golf, soccer, softball, swimming and diving, tennis and volleyball. Rock Bridge has won Football State Championships with undefeated teams in 1975 and 1977. Winter sports include basketball and wrestling. Spring sports include baseball and track and field. Year-round sports include cheerleading and poms. They have won 47 state championships in baseball (1), boys (1) and girls (5) basketball, boys cross country (2), football (2), boys (5) and girls (2) golf, softball (1), boys (2) and girls (4) swimming and diving, boys (8) and girls (13) tennis, and boys track and field (1). They are most prolific in tennis, winning 8 boys championships and 13 girls championships. During the 2020/21 school year, they were state champions in boys cross country, softball, and boys track and field.

== Journalism ==
From the time the school opened journalism has been part of the course offerings for the school. There was a newspaper, The Rock, as well as a yearbook, Flashback. In 1995, the school created a prerequisite class called Journalistic Writing, and the paper became a monthly publication. The journalism department created a special edition magazine, Southpaw, in 2005, and in 2011, an online news source, Bearing News. The Rock began on letter-sized sheets that were published through a class. In 1994, it began its run as a monthly publication.

== Notable faculty and alumni ==
- Jake Adelstein, journalist, author
- Carter Arey, Team USA wheelchair basketball player
- Rob Benedict, actor
- Amy Benedict, actress
- Caitlin Casey, astrophysicist
- Sophie Cunningham, professional basketball player
- Carl Edwards, NASCAR driver
- Dajuan Harris Jr., point guard for the Kansas Jayhawks
- Tom Hart (sportscaster)
- Josh Kroenke, businessperson
- Spencer Miles, MLB pitcher
- Trey Millard, former NFL fullback
- Isiaih Mosley, University of Missouri basketball player
- Barry Odom, football coach
- J. T. Rogers, Tony Award-winning playwright
- Nischelle Turner, entertainment correspondent, Entertainment Tonight
- Brian Wesbury, economist
- Timothy M. Wolfe, former president of the University of Missouri System; quarterbacked 1975 Rock Bridge 3A state championship football team
