= Joplin tornado =

2011 tornado in Missouri, US

Coordinates: 37°03′38″N 94°31′51″W

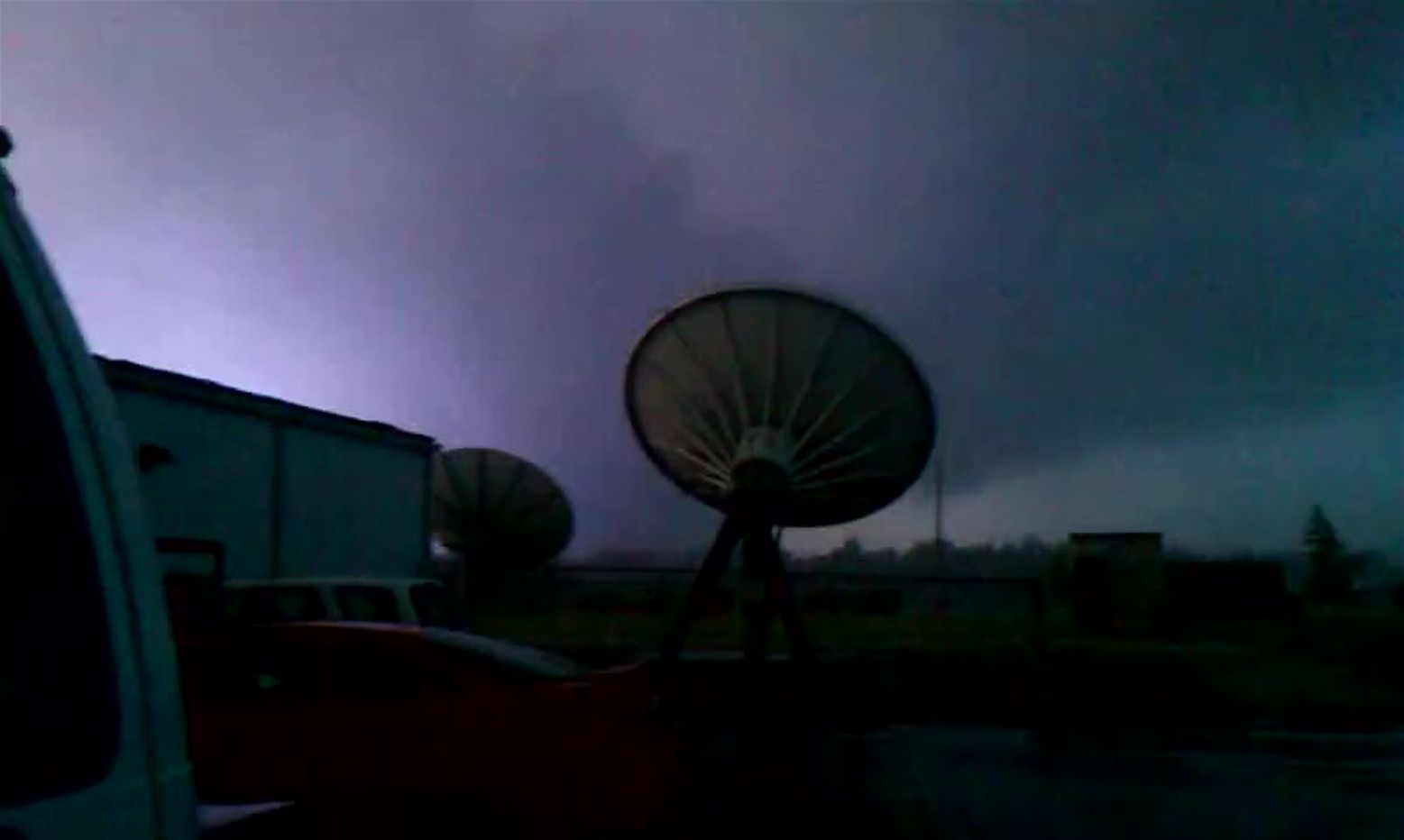
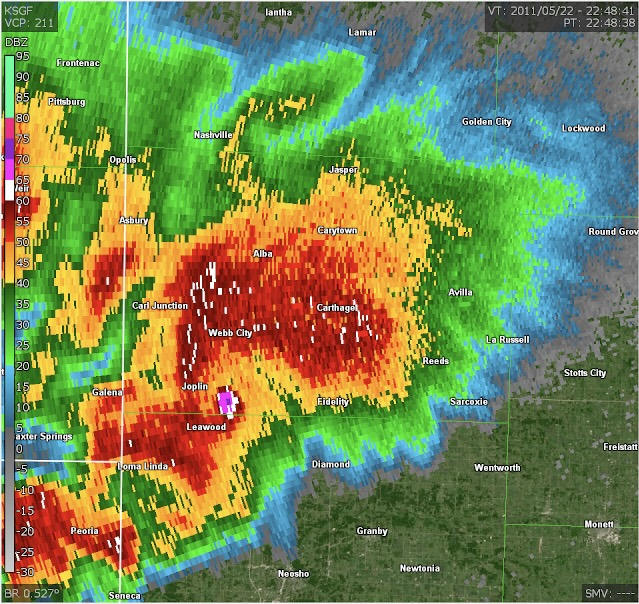
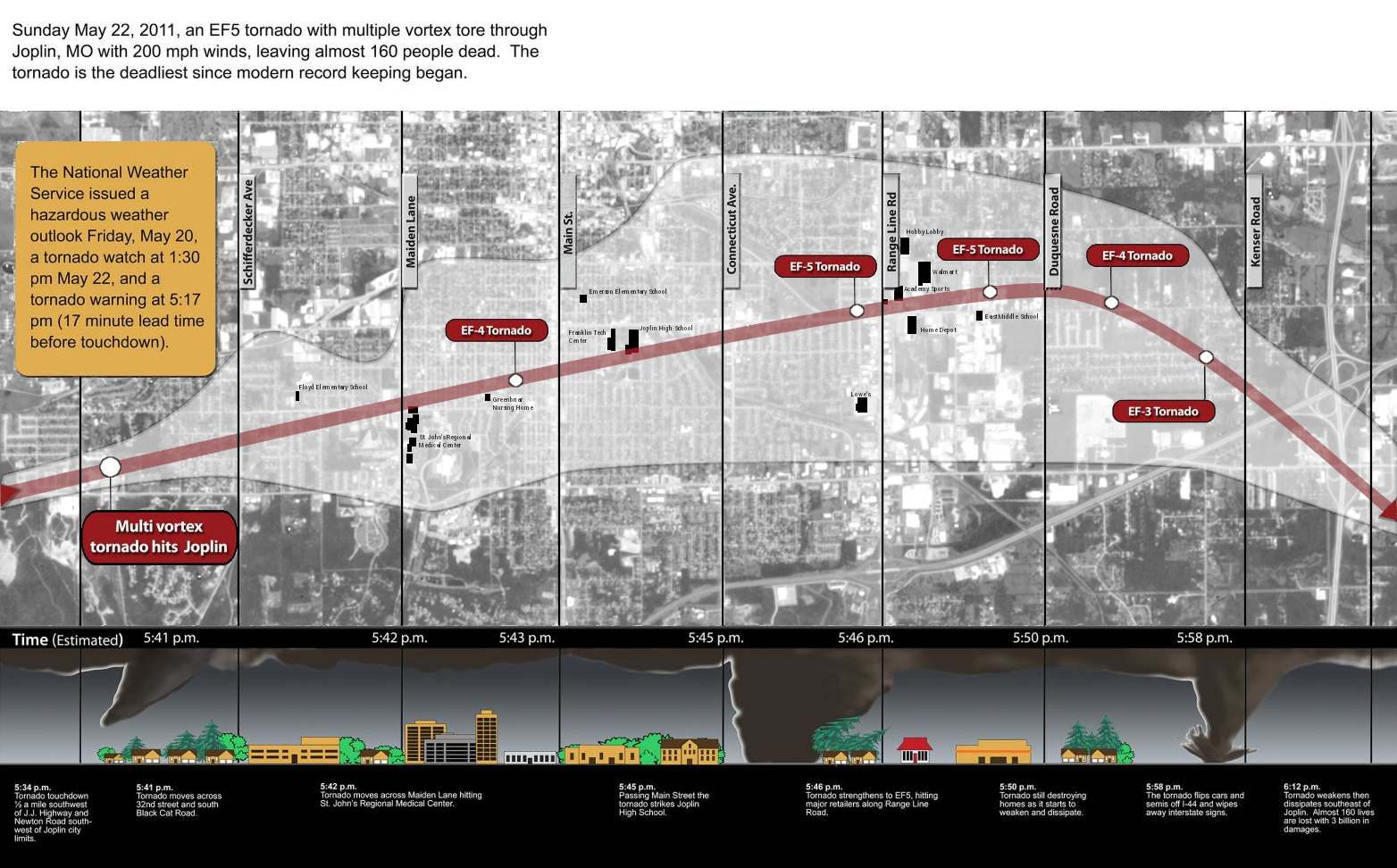
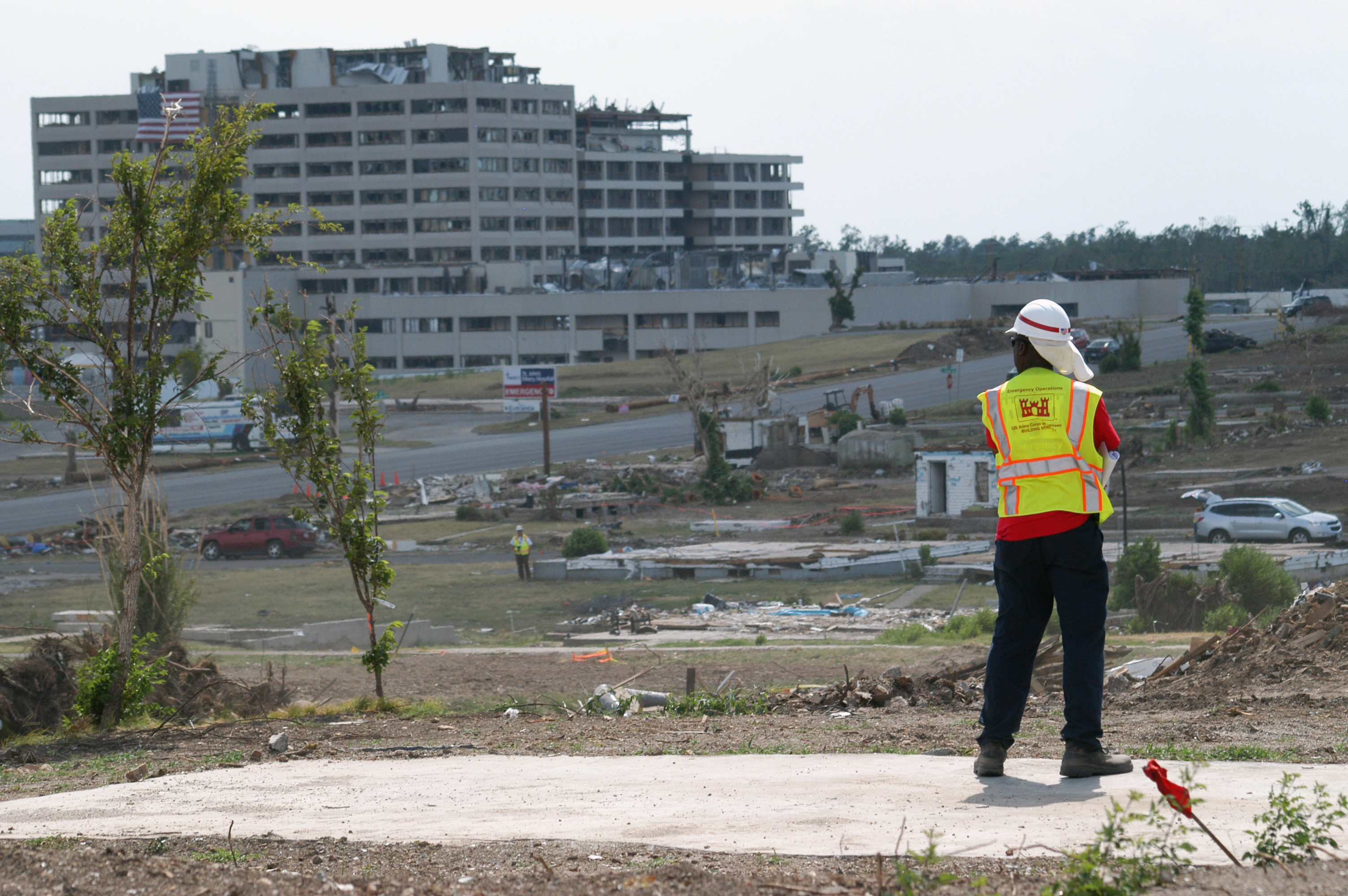
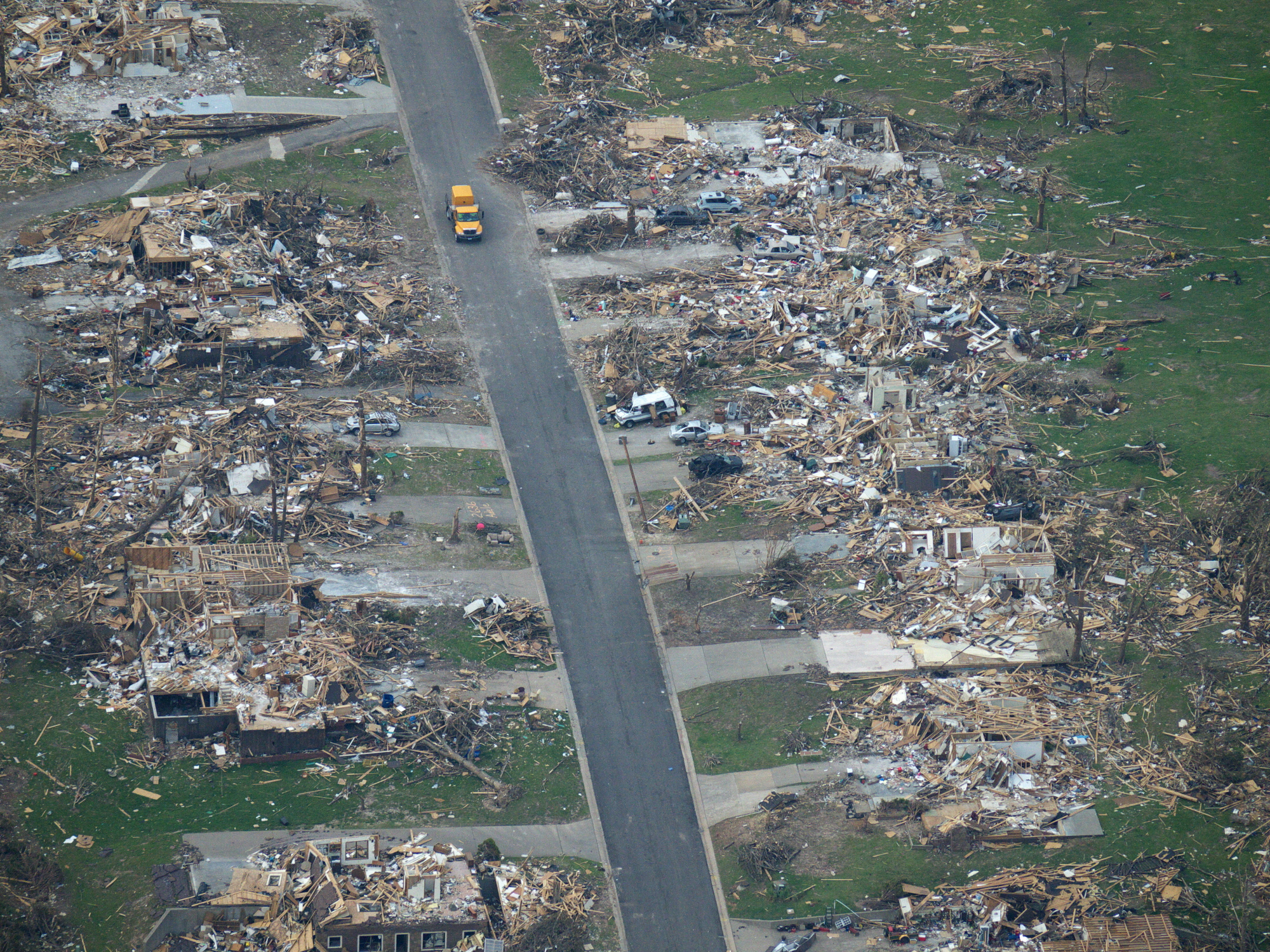
- Clockwise from top: The rain-wrapped tornado being illuminated by a power flash as it was entering Joplin; track and timeline of the tornado; aerial view of Joplin 10 days after the tornado; severe damage to the St. John's Regional Medical Center; radar image of the tornado in the city of Joplin, with a clear debris ball present

Meteorological history
- Formed: May 22, 2011, 5:34 p.m. CDT (UTC−05:00)
- Dissipated: May 22, 2011, 6:12 p.m. CDT (UTC−05:00)
- Duration: 38 minutes

EF5 tornado
- on the Enhanced Fujita scale
- Max width: 1,760 yards (1.0 mi; 1.6 km)
- Path length: 21.62 miles (34.79 km)
- Highest winds: Official intensity: >200 mph (320 km/h); Estimated intensity: 225–250 mph (362–402 km/h) (via University of Colorado Boulder & NWS meteorologist Bill Davis)

Overall effects
- Fatalities: 158 direct (+8–9 indirect)
- Injuries: ≥1,150
- Damage: $2.8 billion (2011 USD) (Costliest tornado in U.S. history) $4.01 billion (2025 USD)
- Areas affected: Joplin and surrounding areas
- Power outages: 20,000
- Houses destroyed: 4,380
- Part of the tornado outbreak sequence of May 21–26, 2011 and tornadoes of 2011

The Joplin tornado was a catastrophic EF5 tornado that struck the city of Joplin, Missouri during the early evening hours of May 22, 2011, causing extreme damage to Joplin and surrounding regions. As part of a larger late-May sequence of tornadic activity, the extremely violent tornado began just west of Joplin at about 5:34 p.m. CDT (UTC–05:00) and quickly reached a peak width of nearly 1 mile (1.6 km) as it tracked through the southern part of the city, before later impacting rural Jasper and Newton counties and dissipating after 38 minutes on the ground at 6:12 p.m. The tornado was on the ground for a total of 21.62 miles (34.79 km).

The tornado devastated a large portion of the city of Joplin, damaging nearly 8,000 buildings and destroying over 4,000 houses. The damage—which included major facilities like one of Joplin's two hospitals as well as much of its basic infrastructure—amounted to a total of $2.8 billion (equivalent to about $4 billion today), making the Joplin tornado the costliest single tornado in U.S. history. The insurance payout was the highest in Missouri history, breaking the previous $2 billion record from the hailstorm of April 10, 2001. The tornado was the fifth out of six total EF5 tornadoes that occurred in 2011, with four having occurred a month earlier during the 2011 Super Outbreak, and only two days before the same outbreak sequence produced another EF5 tornado in El Reno, Oklahoma on May 24.

Overall, the tornado killed 158 people (including eight indirect deaths) and injured some 1,150 others, making it the deadliest tornado of 2011. It ranks as the deadliest tornado in Missouri in addition to being one of the deadliest in the United States, having the highest death toll since the Glazier–Woodward F5 tornado in Texas and Oklahoma in 1947 and the seventh-deadliest overall in the U.S. It was the first F5/EF5 tornado to occur in Missouri since May 20, 1957, when an F5 tornado destroyed several suburbs of Kansas City, and only the second F5/EF5 tornado in Missouri since 1950. It was the third tornado to strike Joplin since May 5, 1971.

In the aftermath, President Barack Obama toured the city on May 29, speaking at a memorial service for the victims. He would also deliver the commencement address at Joplin High School a year later in 2012. Services were set up to help rebuild, with most of the town having businesses reopen as well as new ones being built by 2018. Additionally, the tornado helped inspire FEMA to create the Waffle House Index for disaster preparations as a result of some locations remaining open during the storm.

== Meteorological synopsis ==
On the evening of May 21, 2011, an area of low pressure developed, centered over western South Dakota. This feature, in addition to steep lapse rates and dewpoints above 60 °F (16 °C), was conducive to the supercell development later in the day. Very large hail was forecasted, but the tornado threat was predicted to remain isolated. At 8:00 a.m. CDT (13:00 UTC), the National Weather Service (NWS) Storm Prediction Center (SPC) issued a slight risk of severe storms for much of the upper Plains and the Midwest.

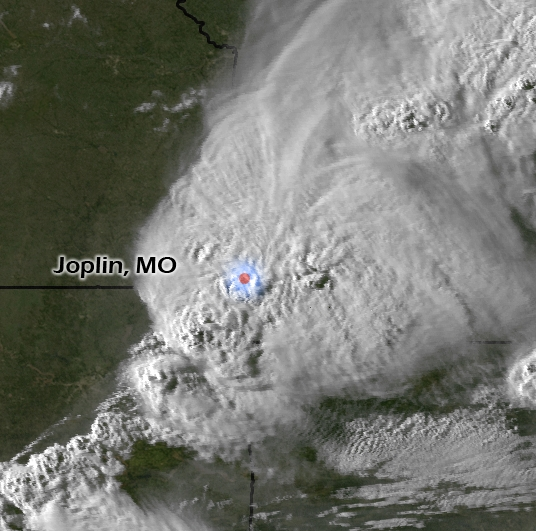
A cropped satellite image shows the supercell thunderstorm that produced the 2011 Joplin tornado at 22:45 UTC, just as it was moving through the city

By 8:00 a.m. CDT (13:00 UTC) on May 22, forecasters at the SPC realized that a more intense weather outbreak was likely to occur, and upgraded a large swath of the Midwest to a moderate risk. The system was forecast to evolve into a wave early Monday morning as a trough strengthened from the western United States. At the surface, a cold front was forecast to pass through the region later in the day, while a dryline was forecast to intersect the cold front in Kansas. These features, accompanied by the low-pressure system, encouraged very strong storm development along the cold front. By the 11:30 a.m. CDT (16:00 UTC) updated outlook, certainty had grown stronger that a major severe weather event would occur that afternoon. A public severe weather outlook was issued at this time, and the outlook stated that severe weather was expected that afternoon, with tornadoes, large hail and strong winds all named as threats.

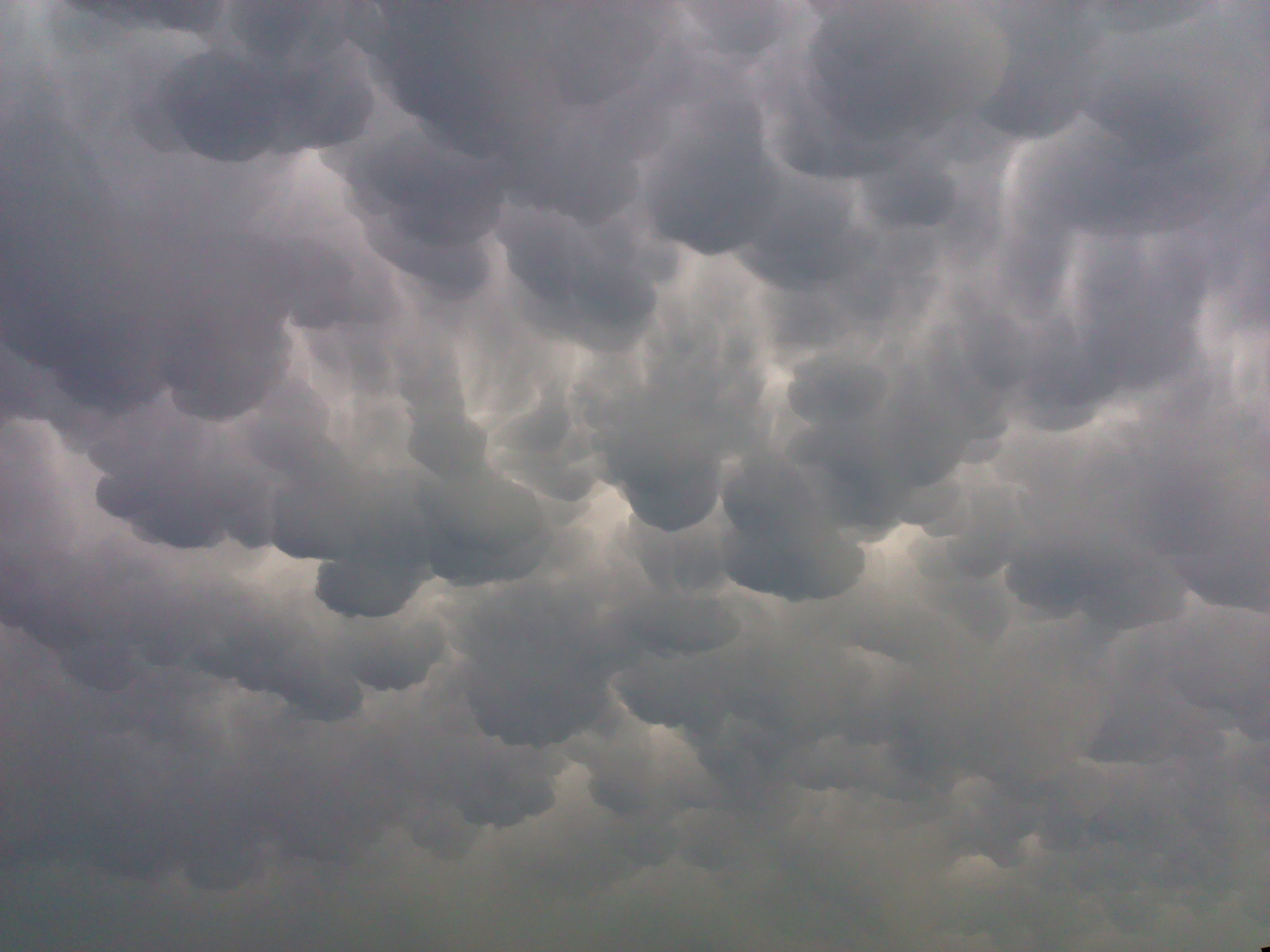
Mammatus clouds over Joplin, 40 minutes before the tornado.

At 1:30 p.m. CDT (18:30 UTC), four hours prior to the tornado, the SPC issued a tornado watch for southwestern Missouri, to remain in effect until 9:00 p.m. CDT. The watch predicted "explosive thunderstorm development," with a "strong tornado or two possible." Thunderstorms began developing between 2:00 and 3:00 p.m. over southeast Kansas and quickly became severe. As thunderstorm development continued moving to the east, forecasters became more concerned about imminent tornado development. A tornado warning west of Joplin that eventually produced the EF5 tornado was first issued at 5:17 p.m. CDT (22:17 UTC), 17 minutes before it touched ground and 19 minutes before it entered the city of Joplin.

== Tornado summary, track and damage ==
=== Beginning ===
The tornado first touched down in Newton County, Missouri, just east of the Missouri–Kansas state line, approximately one-half mile (0.80 km) southwest of the intersection of South Central City Road and 32nd Street, at 5:34 p.m. CDT (22:34 UTC). Eyewitnesses and storm chasers reported multiple vortices rotating around the parent circulation. Here, the tornado downed several large trees at EF0 intensity. Civil defense sirens sounded in Joplin twenty minutes before the tornado struck, in response to the tornado warning issued at 5:17 p.m. CDT (22:17 UTC) for northwestern Newton and southwestern Jasper counties in Missouri, and southeastern portions of Cherokee County, Kansas, but many Joplin residents did not heed the warning or the sirens.

The tornado moved east-northeast and strengthened to EF1 intensity as it continued through rural areas towards Joplin, snapping trees and power poles and damaging outbuildings. The tornado then widened and tracked into the more densely populated southwest corner of the city near the Twin Hills Country Club. The tornado heavily damaged several homes at a subdivision in this area at up to EF3 strength before continuing to move through another subdivision just east of Iron Gates Road. Numerous homes were destroyed and multiple vehicles tossed around, some of which were thrown onto or rolled into homes.

=== EF5 intensity in Joplin ===
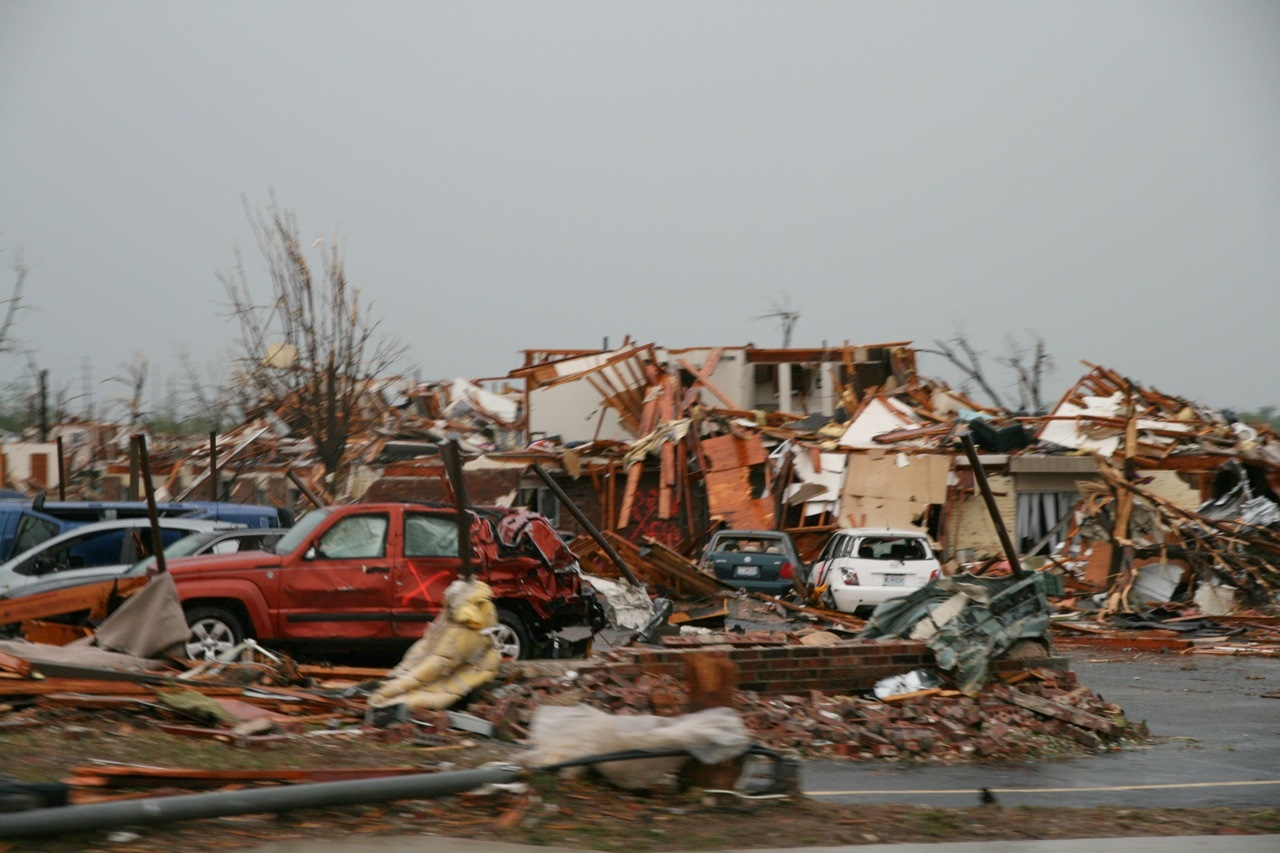
A destroyed area in the tornado's damage path on May 23.

The tornado reached EF4 intensity just before crossing S. Schifferdecker Ave. The now massive and wedge-shaped tornado then crossed S. Schifferdecker Ave. at 5:38 p.m. CDT (22:38 UTC), producing its first area of EF4 damage just four minutes after touching down, as several small but well-built commercial buildings were flattened. One person was killed after they were ejected from their car as the tornado crossed the road. Further strengthening resulted in the tornado reaching EF5 intensity shortly afterwards. Consistent EF4 to EF5 damage was noted east of S. Schifferdecker Ave. and continued through most of southern Joplin. Numerous homes, businesses, and medical buildings were flattened in this area, with concrete walls crushed into the foundations. A large steel-reinforced step and floor structure leading to a completely destroyed medical building was "deflected upward several inches and cracked". Steel trusses from some of the buildings were "rolled up like paper", and deformation or twisting of the main support beams was noted. Multiple vehicles were thrown and mangled or wrapped around trees nearby. Several 300-pound (140 kg) concrete parking stops anchored with rebar were torn from a parking lot in this area and thrown up to 60 yards (55 m) away. Iowa State University wind engineer Partha Sarkar calculated the force needed to remove the parking stops from the lot and found that winds exceeding 200 mph (320 km/h) would have been required.

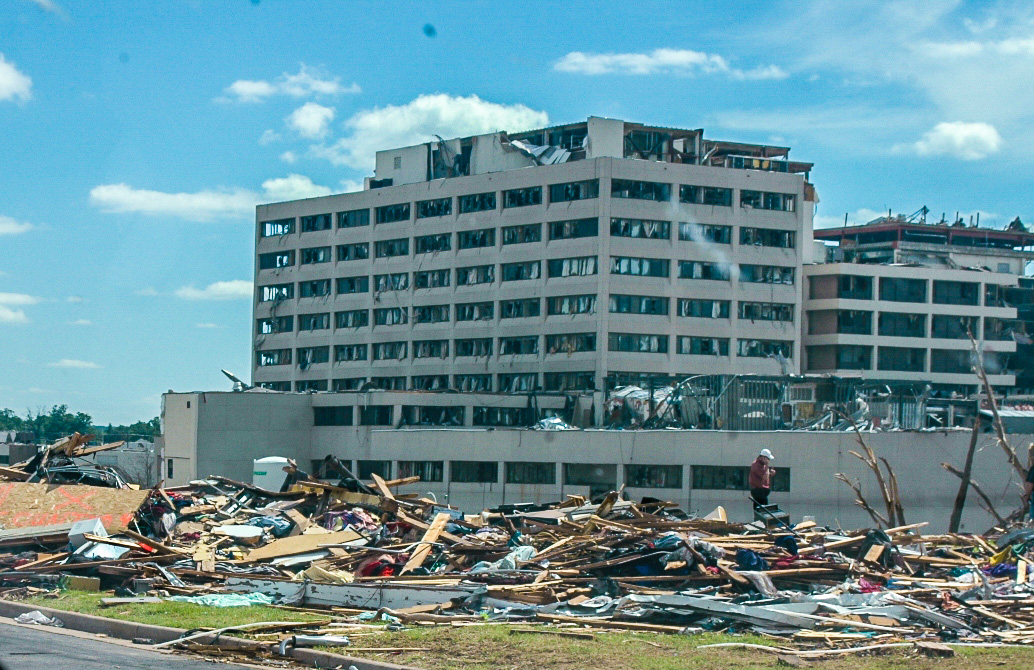
St. John's Regional Medical Center sustained EF3-EF4 damage and had to be torn down due to being rendered completely non functional.

Damage became widespread and catastrophic at and around the nearby St. John's Regional Medical Center, which lost nearly every window on three sides, interior walls, ceilings, and part of its roof; its life flight helicopter was also blown away and destroyed. Loss of backup power caused five fatalities, and the building was damaged so severely that it was rendered completely non-functional and was later torn down. According to the NWS office in Springfield, Missouri, such extreme structural damage to such a large and well-built structure likely indicated winds at or exceeding 200 mph (320 km/h). Vehicles in the hospital parking lot were thrown into the air and mangled beyond recognition, including a semi-truck that was tossed 125 yards (114 m) and wrapped completely around a debarked tree. Small pieces of debris from the hospital, including X-rays, medical reports, and dental records, were found in Greene and Polk counties many miles to the east. Wind-rowing of debris was noted in this area, and more concrete parking stops were removed from the St. John's parking lot. Virtually every house near McClelland Boulevard and 26th Street was flattened; some were swept completely away, and trees sustained severe debarking.

==== Peak intensity ====
The emergency waiting room in St. John's Regional Medical Center as it was being impacted by the tornado

As the tornado tracked eastward, it maintained EF5 strength as it crossed Main Street (Route 43) between 20th and 26th Streets. It heavily damaged every business along that stretch and virtually destroyed several institutional buildings. Despite destroying entire neighborhoods in the area with some more homes swept away, the tornado tracked just south of downtown, narrowly missing it. At some residences, reinforced concrete porches were deformed or, in some cases, completely torn away. Numerous vehicles were tossed up to several blocks, and a few homeowners never located their vehicles. A large church, a nursing home, Franklin Technology Center, St. Mary's Catholic Church and School, and Joplin High School were all destroyed along this corridor. The Greenbriar Nursing Home was completely leveled, with 21 fatalities occurring there alone, with dozens of fatalities occurring elsewhere in this area as well. Nobody was in the high school at the time, as the graduation ceremonies held about three miles (5 km) to the north at Missouri Southern State University had concluded shortly before the storm. Pieces of cardboard were found embedded in stucco walls that remained standing at Joplin High School. Steel beams and pieces of fencing were deeply embedded into the ground in fields near the high school, steel fence posts were bent to the ground in opposite directions, and a school bus was thrown into a nearby bus garage. As the tornado crossed Connecticut Avenue further to the east, it destroyed several large apartment buildings which resulted in 14 fatalities, along with a Dillons grocery store, and a bank. Only the concrete safety deposit box vault remained at the bank, and a wooden 2×4 beam was found speared completely through a concrete curb at one location. The tornado then approached Rangeline Road, the main commercial strip in the eastern part of Joplin, affecting additional neighborhoods along 20th Street.

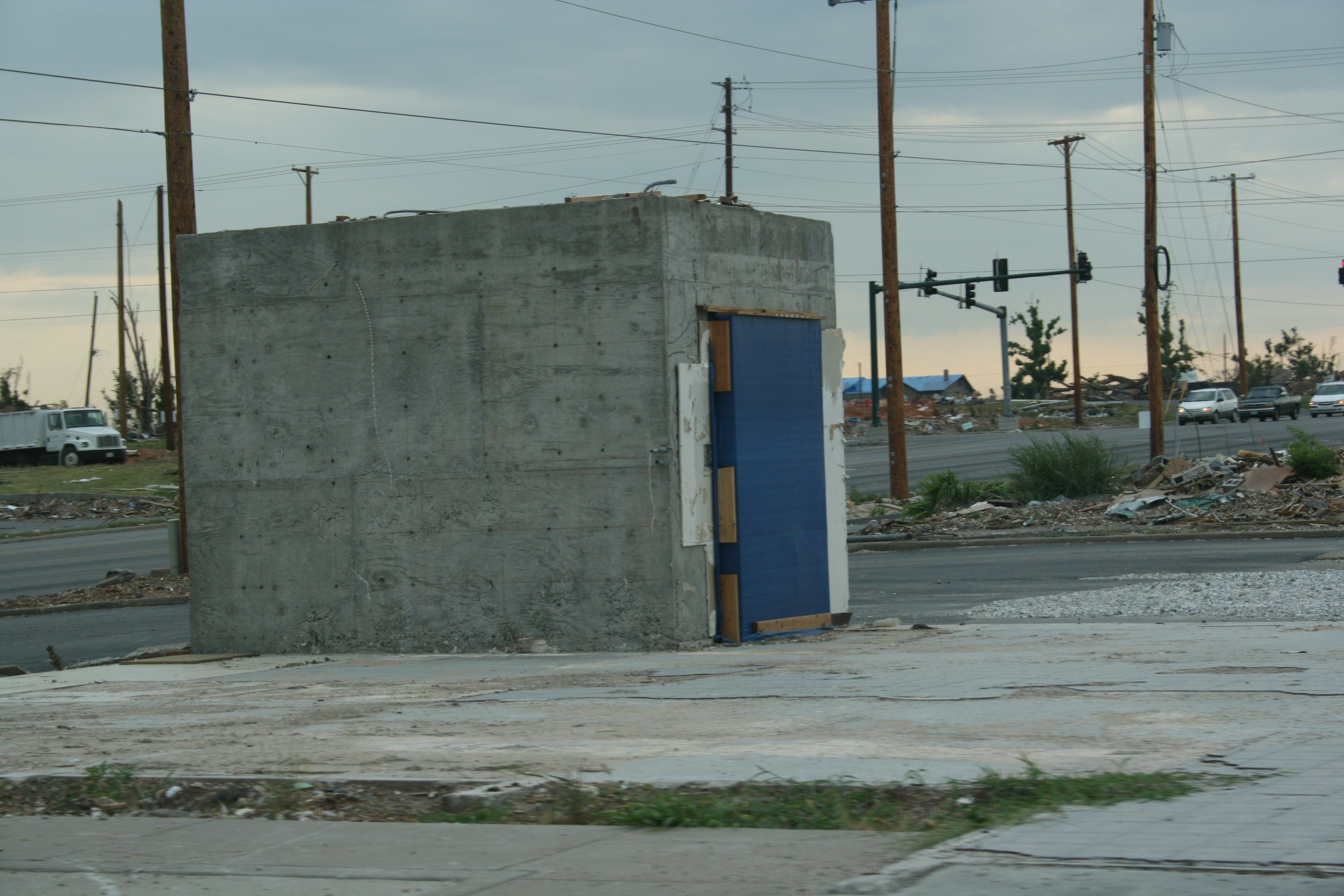
A safety deposit box vault seen after the tornado, having remained intact despite the destruction of the bank building that housed it.

The now heavily rain-wrapped tornado continued at EF5 intensity as it crossed Range Line Road. In that corridor between about 13th and 32nd Streets, the tornado continued producing catastrophic damage as it reached its widest point nearly one mile (1.6 km) across. As the tornado struck a Pizza Hut on South Range Line Road, store manager Christopher Lucas herded four employees and 15 customers into a walk-in freezer. With difficulty closing the door, he wrapped a bungee cord holding the door shut around his arm until he was sucked out and killed. The tornado completely destroyed a Walmart supercenter, a Home Depot, and numerous other businesses and restaurants in the area, many of which were flattened. Numerous metal roof trusses were torn from the Home Depot building and were found broken and mangled in nearby fields, and cars originally parked at the Home Depot parking lot were found hundreds of yards away. Asphalt was scoured from parking lots at Walmart and a nearby pizza restaurant, and large tractor-trailers were thrown up to 200 yards (180 m) away. An Academy Sports + Outdoors store along Range Line sustained major structural damage, and a chair was found impaled legs-first through an exterior stucco wall there. A nearby three-story apartment complex was also devastated, and two cell phone towers collapsed. In this area, numerous cars were thrown and piled on top of each other, 100-pound (45 kg) manhole covers were removed from roads and thrown, and a Pepsi distribution plant was completely leveled. Additional calculations with regards to the manhole covers by Partha Sarkar revealed that winds had to have exceeded 200 miles per hour (320 km/h) for the manhole covers to be removed. Twenty fatalities occurred in this area, and the damage was rated as EF5.

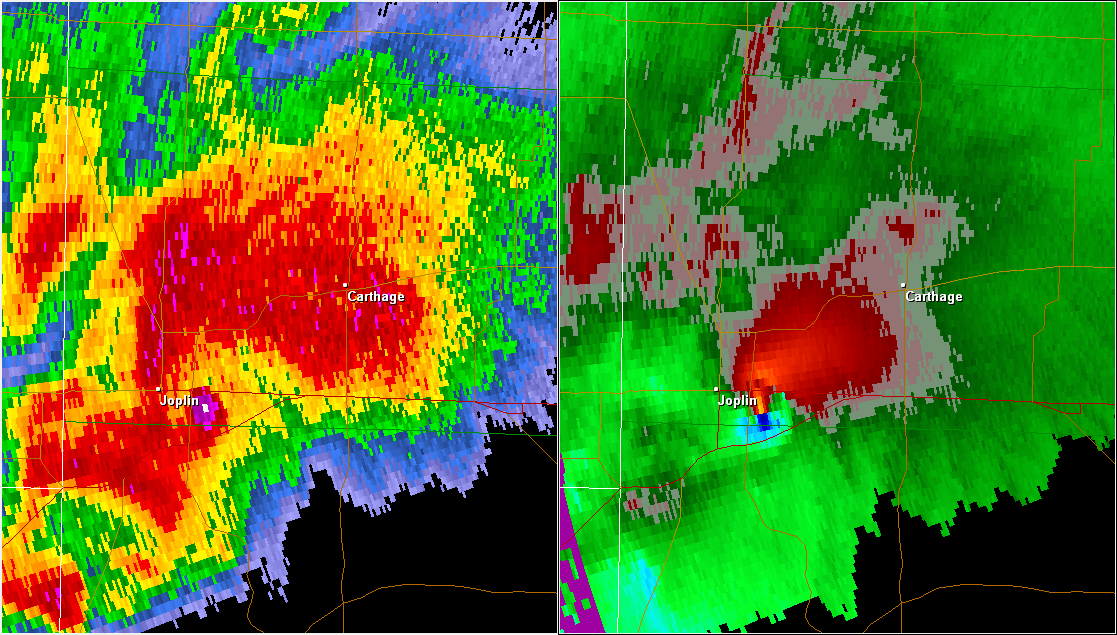
A radar image of the supercell that produced the tornado shows both a distinctive "hook echo" (left) and an impressive velocity signature (right).

Extreme damage continued in the area of Duquesne Road in southeast Joplin. Homes and the industrial park near the corner of 20th and Duquesne was especially hard hit with nearly every building flattened. Several large warehouse structures were swept cleanly from their foundations, and several heavy industrial vehicles were thrown up to 400 yards (370 m) away. The last area of EF5 damage occurred in the industrial park, and a nearby Fastrip gas station and convenience store was completely destroyed – a famous first-person video of the direct hit was recorded by a man sheltering in the beer cooler here. Many homes were destroyed further to the east at EF3 to EF4 strength in a nearby subdivision, and East Middle School sustained major damage.

=== Weakening and dissipation ===
The tornado then continued on an east to east-southeast trajectory towards I-44 where it weakened; nonetheless, vehicles were blown off the highway and mangled near US 71 (exit 11) (now I-49) interchange. The damage at and around the interchange was rated EF2 to EF3. The weakening tornado continued to track into the rural areas of southeastern Jasper County and northeastern Newton County where damage was generally minor to moderate, with trees, mobile homes, outbuildings, and frame homes damaged at EF0 to EF1 strength. The tornado lifted east of Diamond at 6:12 p.m. CDT (23:12 UTC), according to aerial surveys. The total track length was 21.62 miles (34.79 km) long, and the tornado was up to 0.75–1 mile (1.21–1.61 km) across at its widest point. A total of 158 people were killed, and over 1,150 others were injured along the path. A separate EF2 tornado touched down near Wentworth from the same supercell about 25 miles (40 km) east-southeast of Joplin, beginning roughly 10 minutes before the dissipation of this tornado.

== Aftermath and impact ==
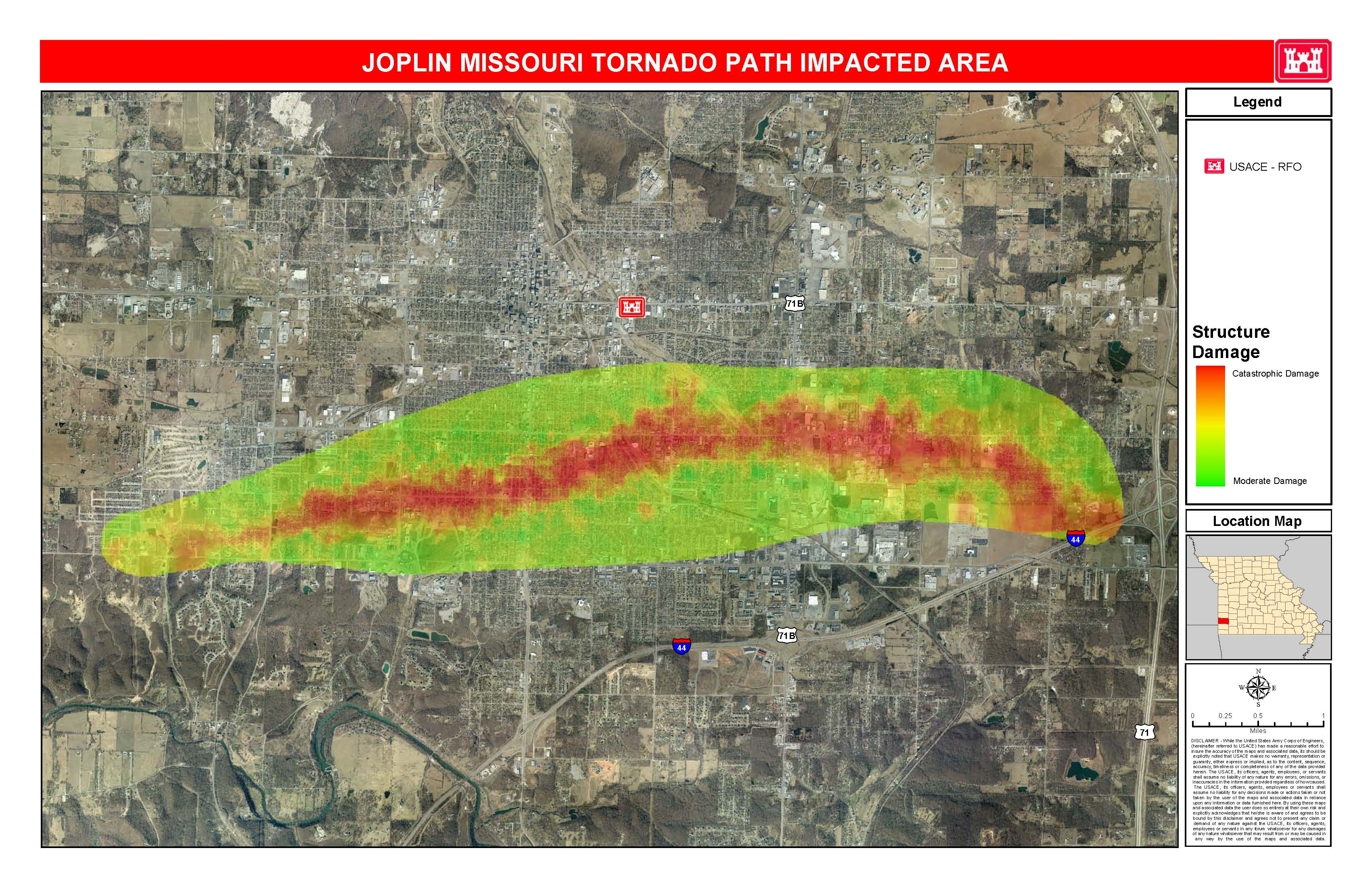
A United States Army Corps of Engineers map shows the tornado's damage path as it moved nearly due east through Joplin, with the most intense damage near its centerline.

A preliminary survey of the tornado damage by the NWS office in Springfield began on May 23. The initial survey confirmed a violent tornado rated as a high-end EF4. Subsequent damage surveys, however, found evidence of more intense damage, and so the tornado was upgraded to an EF5 with estimated winds over 200 mph (320 km/h), peaking at 225 to 250 mph (360 to 400 km/h).

The scope of the damage was immense: according to the local branch of the American Red Cross, about 25% of Joplin was destroyed, though emergency officials reported some level of damage to about 75% of the city. A week after the tornado, Joplin's mayor estimated that 25% of the businesses licensed in the city were damaged or destroyed.

Official accountings of the precise number of buildings damaged or destroyed vary somewhat. According to the National Institute of Standards and Technology (NIST) technical report, in total 7,964 buildings were damaged in Joplin, including 7,411 residential buildings and 553 non-residential. At least 3,734 of those buildings (including 3,181 of the residential and all 553 of the non-residential buildings) sustained so much damage as to be considered destroyed. (Note: Per the associated reference, this damage total belongs to the City of Joplin, where the tornado spent the vast majority of its lifetime and did the most damage. It does not include the damage to structures outside the city, where the tornado touched down (to the southwest) and dissipated (to the east).) According to a Federal Emergency Management Agency (FEMA) study, 8,264 homes were impacted, and of those, 3,884 were "significantly damaged" and 4,380 were destroyed.

=== Infrastructure ===
The tornado severely damaged critical infrastructure in the city, hampering emergency response and recovery efforts. Approximately 4,000 electricity distribution poles were damaged, more than 110 miles (180 km) of distribution line brought down, 135 transmission towers "affected," and an electrical substation in the path of the tornado was completely destroyed (two more were damaged, but reparably so). In the immediate aftermath of the storm, approximately 20,000 people were left without power, and those with homes left intact could not get it restored until 10–12 days later, when their dwellings were approved for safe occupancy. The ultimate cost of rebuilding Joplin's damaged electricity system was calculated at $25.7 million.

The tornado also caused about 4,000 leaks in water service lines, dropping Joplin's water system pressure below operating level and necessitating a block-by-block effort to find and repair the service line leaks, with a water boil order issued for the entire city in the meantime. Water pressure was returned to normal outside of the damage area within 48 hours, and the water boil order was lifted after five and a half days. Approximately 3,500 gas meters and 55,000 feet (17,000 m) of gas main were damaged, and it took two weeks to stem every gas leak; some damaged mains could not be shut off because they served critical facilities like Freeman Health System, the lone remaining hospital in Joplin. In east Joplin, 3,000–5,000 pounds (1,400–2,300 kg) of anhydrous ammonia was released from a valve at a trucking facility and quickly contained; no significant toxic releases occurred.

With 21 cell towers down and fiber cables damaged, cellular communications—voice calls in particular, text messages less so—were heavily impeded. Temporary mobile cell towers were deployed by wireless carriers to fill the gap within 24 hours. By May 24, three towers owned by AT&T and Sprint had been restored.

=== Insurance ===
An early estimate from catastrophe risk modeling firm Eqecat, Inc. placed the insured losses from the tornado at $1–3 billion USD. By mid-June, more than 19,000 insurance claims had been filed, a number that rose to 61,000, with a total payout of more than $2 billion—31% going to homeowners and 5% to those who lost vehicles. The impact on the insurance industry was not so much due to the number of claims, but the cumulative effect of such a large number of total losses. More than 2,500 local people employed in insurance were involved in some capacity. It was presumed that State Farm would assume the largest share of these losses, having market share of 27% for homeowners insurance and 21% for automobile insurance.

The $2.8 billion in damage is the largest amount for a tornado since the Tuscaloosa-Birmingham EF4 which occurred in the same year.

=== Casualties ===
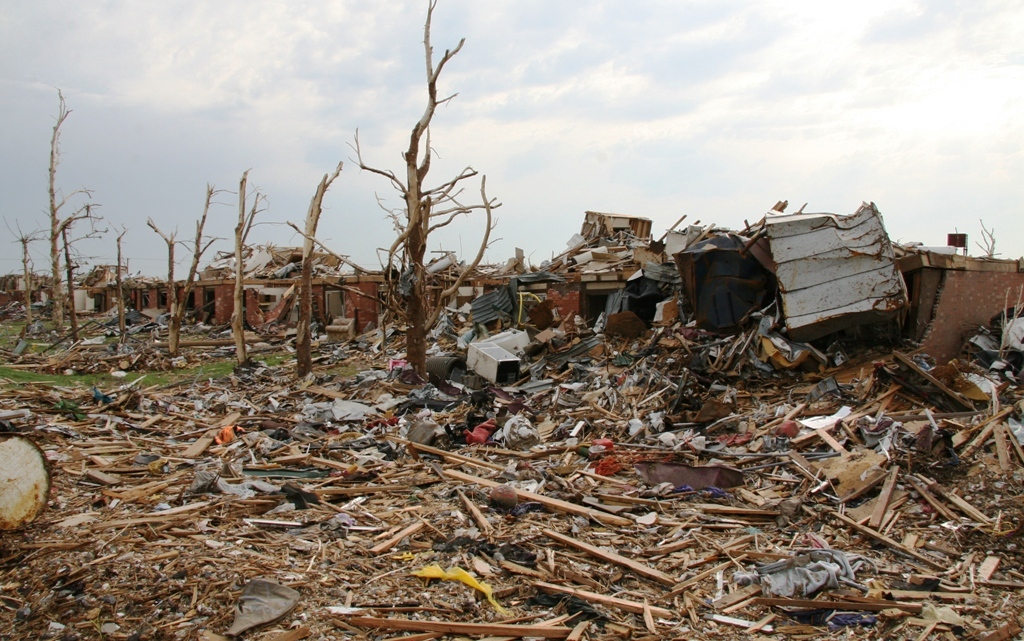
Extreme damage from the tornado is still clear on June 14, nearly three weeks later, with debarked trees visible in front of destroyed homes.

As of May 2013, the official death toll from NWS was listed at 158 while the City of Joplin listed the death toll at 161 (158 direct). The list was up to 162, until one man's injuries were found to be unrelated to the event. In one indirect fatality, a policeman was struck by lightning and killed while assisting with recovery and cleanup efforts the day after the storm. Another five indirect fatalities occurred after a disease outbreak of mucormycosis infected 13 people, possibly 18 people. Shortly after the tornado, authorities had listed 1,300 people as missing, but the number quickly dwindled as they were accounted for. Many people were reported to have been trapped in destroyed houses. Seventeen people were rescued from the rubble the day after the tornado struck. Of 146 sets of remains recovered from the rubble, 134 victims had been positively identified by June 1. This total included four sets of partial remains, some of which may have been from a single person. On June 2, it was announced that four more victims had died.

Six people were killed when St. John's Regional Medical Center was struck by the tornado. Five of those deaths were patients on ventilators who died after the building lost power and a backup generator did not work. The sixth fatality was a hospital visitor.

The Joplin Globe reported that 54% of the people killed died in their residences, 32% died in non-residential areas and 14% died in vehicles or outdoors. Joplin officials after the tornado announced plans to require hurricane ties or other fasteners between the houses and their foundations (devices add about US$600 to the construction costs). Officials rejected a proposal to require concrete basements in new houses. Officials noted that as of 2009, only 28% of Joplin's new homes had basements, compared with 38% two decades before. At least 1,150 people were injured severely enough to seek treatment at regional hospitals. Injuries ranged from cuts and bruises to impalement by large debris. Officials said they rescued 944 pets and reunited 292 with owners.

=== Rating dispute ===
In 2013, the American Society of Civil Engineers published a study disputing the tornado's initial EF5 rating, based on surveying damage on over 150 structures within a six-mile (10 km) segment of the storm's path. According to the report, over 83% of the damage was caused by wind speeds of 135 mph (217 km/h) or less, the maximum wind speed of an EF2 tornado. An additional 13% was caused by EF3 wind speeds, and 3% was consistent with EF4 winds. The study found no damage consistent with wind speeds over 200 mph (320 km/h), the minimum threshold of an EF5 tornado. Researchers concluded that the inability to find EF5 damage was due to the absence of construction standards that were able to determine the necessary wind speeds. Bill Colbourne, a member of the engineering team that surveyed the damage, declared that "a relatively large number of buildings could have survived in Joplin if they had been built to sustain hurricane winds."

However, the EF5 rating stood. The NWS office in Springfield stated that their survey teams found only a small area of EF5 structural damage, and that it could have easily been missed in the survey (at and around St. John's Medical Center). Bill Davis, head of Springfield's NWS office, said that the results of the study "do not surprise me at all," adding that "there was only a very small area of EF5 damage in Joplin...we knew right off the bat there was EF4 damage. It took us longer to identify the EF5 damage and that it would take winds of over 200 mph (320 km/h) to do that damage." Additionally, the basis for the EF5 rating in Joplin was mainly contextual rather than structural, with non-conventional damage indicators such as the removal of concrete parking stops, manhole covers, reinforced concrete porches, driveways, and asphalt used to arrive at a final rating. The presence of wind rowed structural debris, instances of very large vehicles such as buses, vans, and semi-trucks being thrown hundreds of yards to several blocks from their points of origin, the fact that some homeowners never located their vehicles, and the overwhelming extent and totality of the destruction in Joplin were also taken into consideration.

According to a detailed damage survey by Timothy Marshall, a majority of houses were destroyed at winds of EF2-3 strength. However, he identified 22 well anchored houses which were assigned EF5 ratings.

== Response ==
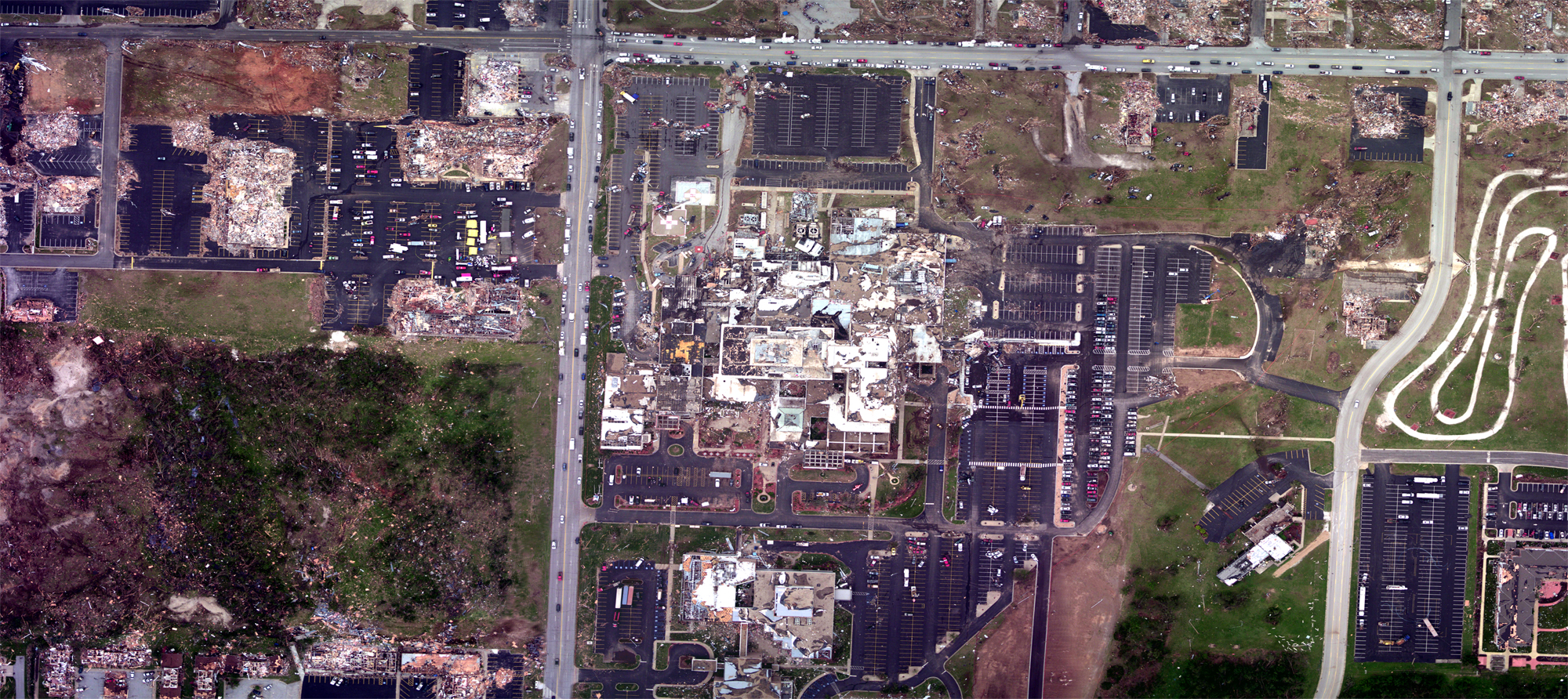
Aerial view of the St. John's Regional Medical Center campus

Immediately following the disaster, emergency responders were deployed within and to the city for search and rescue efforts. Then Governor Jay Nixon declared a state of emergency for the Joplin area shortly after the tornado hit, and ordered Missouri National Guard troops to the city. By May 23, Missouri Task Force One (consisting of 85 personnel, four dogs, and heavy equipment) arrived and began searching for missing persons. Five heavy rescue teams were also sent to the city a day later. Within two days, numerous agencies arrived to assist residents in the recovery process. The National Guard deployed 191 personnel and placed 2,000 more on standby to be deployed if needed. In addition, the Missouri State Highway Patrol provided 180 troopers to assist the Joplin Police Department and other local agencies with law enforcement, rescue, and recovery efforts that also included the deployment of five ambulance strike teams, and a total of 25 ambulances in the affected area on May 24 as well over 75 Marines from the Ft. Leonard Wood Army base. Due to the severe damage caused by the tornado, the traveling Piccadilly Circus was unable to perform as scheduled. As a result, the circus employees brought their two adult elephants to help drag damaged automobiles and other heavy debris out of the streets.

Despite the destruction, two Waffle House locations in Joplin remained open following the tornado. This led Federal Emergency Management Agency Administrator Craig Fugate to develop the concept of the Waffle House Index for measuring disaster impact.

In May 2012, the Missouri National Guard released documents showing that four soldiers looted consumer electronics from a ruined Walmart during efforts to locate survivors the day after the tornado. According to the investigative memo, they believed the merchandise was going to be destroyed. All four soldiers were demoted and had letters of reprimand placed in their personnel files, but were never prosecuted, though many civilian looters were.

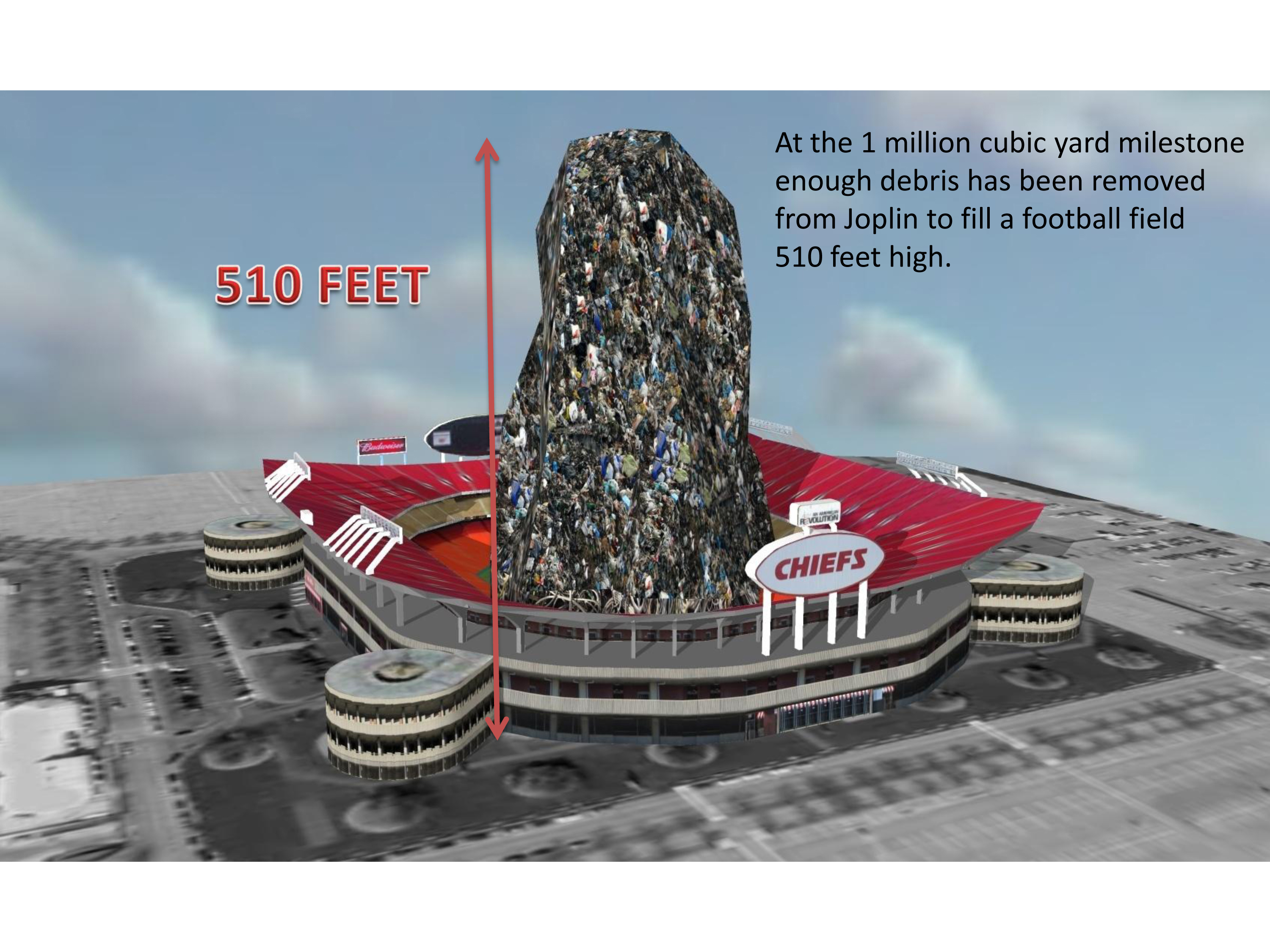
The U.S. Army Corps of Engineers produced this graphic to illustrate the amount of debris removed from Joplin just six weeks after the tornado.

=== Cleanup ===
The Joplin tornado generated an estimated 3 million cubic yards (2.3×10^{6} m^{3}) of debris, an amount sufficient to cover a football field 120 stories high. Removal efforts lasted for months, and at their height more than 410 trucks a day transported debris to landfills in Joplin itself, as well as nearby Galena and Lamar.

The tornado also led to renewed lead contamination on many Joplin properties. Joplin had been the site of lead mining and processing for decades before cleanup efforts began in the mid-1990s, and the tornado's upheaval of the surface as it swept houses from foundations and uprooted trees re-contaminated about 40% of yards in southern Joplin, leaving behind chunks of raw lead ore the size of tennis or golf balls. The city spent more than $5 million to clean the properties up using grants from the Environmental Protection Agency, scraping off the topsoil and replacing it with clean soil, and further required that builders in the damage area test for lead and clean it up before construction.

=== Social media response ===
The tornado also highlighted a new form of disaster response, using social media. This type of disaster response is now known as Social Media Emergency Management. News outlets began aggregating images and video from eyewitnesses shared through social media. Public citizen-led Facebook groups and web sites coordinated information, needs, and offers. The results were so effective the project became a finalist in the 2011 Mashable Awards for Best Social Good Cause Campaign.

=== National attention ===
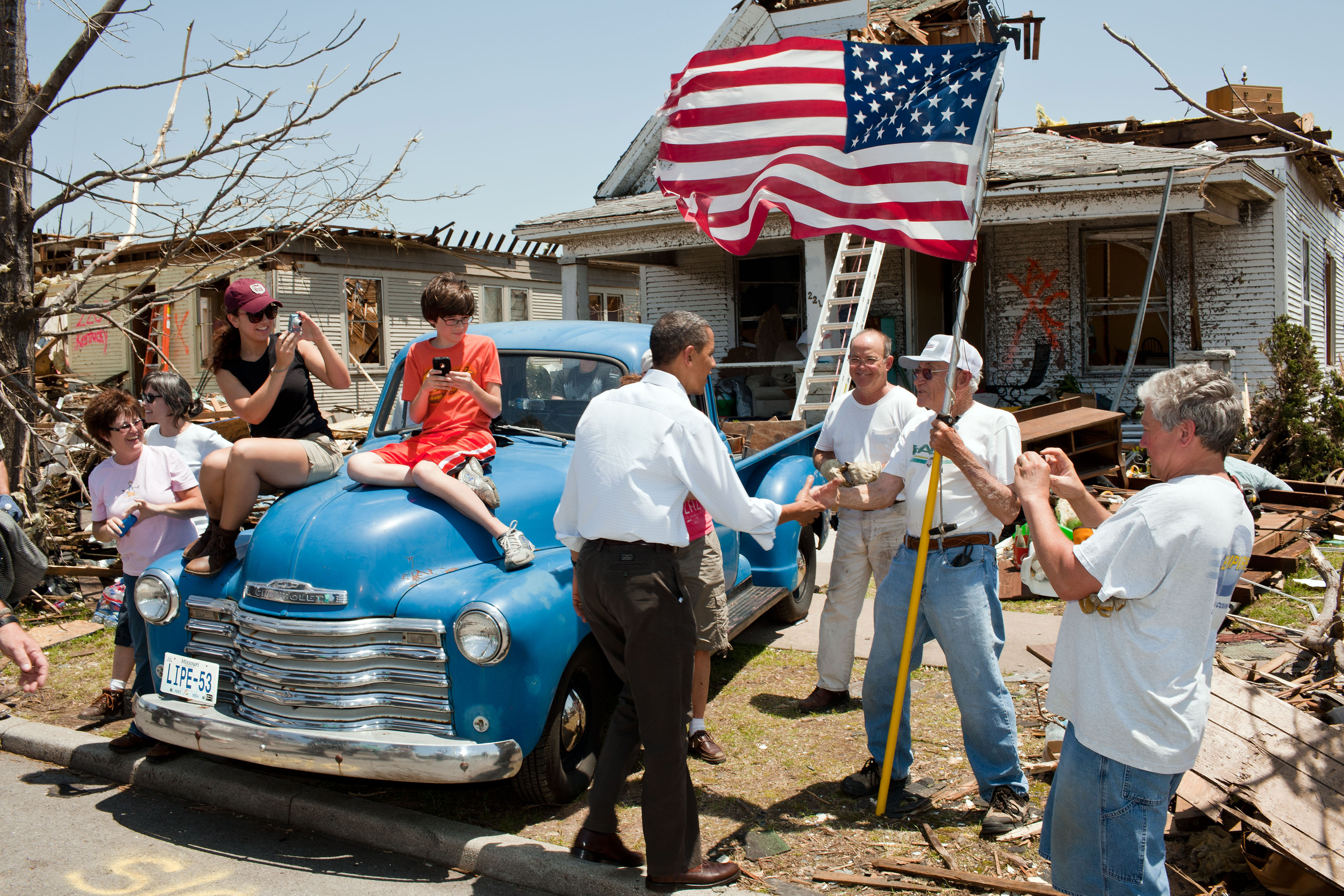
President Obama greets a tornado survivor on May 29, 2011.

President Barack Obama toured the community on May 29, flying into Joplin Regional Airport and speaking at a memorial at the Taylor Performing Arts Center at Missouri Southern State University about two miles (3 km) north of the worst of the devastation. Obama had been on a state visit to Europe at the time of the storm. Members of the controversial Westboro Baptist Church were also scheduled to protest the same day in Joplin, but they did not show up. There was a massive counterprotest that was organized in response to the Westboro protest, in which thousands of protesters showed up holding signs saying, "God Loves Joplin" and "We Support You Joplin."

President Obama also delivered the commencement address at Joplin High School on May 21, 2012, a year after the tornado.

== Rebuilding and recovery ==
FEMA maintained a large presence in Joplin following the tornado, with as many as 820 employees working in the city. One FEMA undertaking was the construction of 15 temporary housing sites in and around Joplin, which housed 586 families/households at their peak.

The city, warned by federal officials that it should expect to lose 25% of its population following the tornado, responded quickly and built an average of five houses a week between 2011 and 2022. Most businesses reopened, and more than 300 new businesses opened between 2011 and early 2016.

In April 2012, Joplin voters approved a $62 million bond to continue constructing new schools and repair damaged existing ones.

Engineers criticized the tilt-up construction of the Home Depot building, in which all but two of the walls collapsed in a domino effect after the tornado lifted the roof, killing seven people in the front of the store (although 28 people in the back of the store survived when those walls collapsed outwards). Home Depot officials disagreed with the study published by The Kansas City Star and said they would use the tilt-up practice when they rebuilt the Joplin store. On June 1, the Home Depot said it would have a new temporary 30,000 sq ft (2,800 m^{2}) building erected and operational within two weeks. In the meantime, it opened for business in the parking lot of its demolished building. On June 20, the Home Depot opened a temporary 60,000 sq ft (5,600 m^{2}) building constructed by the company's disaster recovery team.

Within two years, the city's workers and community groups compiled and published "Joplin Pays it Forward" to give recovery advice to other places struck by disasters. Many homes and businesses have been rebuilt since the tornado. Joplin High School was reopened on September 2, 2014. St. John's Regional Medical Center (now Mercy Hospital) had to be rebuilt and reopened in 2015.

=== Mental health impacts ===
Eighteen people committed suicide in the wake of the tornado, according to the executive director of the Community Clinic of Southwest Missouri, a co-chair of the city's long-term recovery team. Calls about domestic violence grew in the year following the disaster. In 2024, Jennifer M. First, J. Brian Houston, and Sangwon Lee with the University of Tennessee along with Megan Carnahan and Mansoo Yu with the University of Missouri, published a qualitative case study of survivors from the tornado, in which they described how survivors recovered from "tornado brain". In the paper, they stated approximately 41% of the residents of Joplin were directly impacted by the tornado and that the tornado lead to "various mental health disorders such as depression, anxiety, and post-traumatic stress disorder".

=== “Butterfly people” ===
The butterfly people were winged beings, purported to have been seen in Joplin during the storm. Most but not all of the alleged encounters came from children who described them as being humanoid angelic beings with butterfly wings protecting them during the tornado or carrying the souls of those who died due to the disaster off into the sky. Hundreds of stories from different individuals spread through the local area with varying accounts shortly after the tornado ended, all concluding that what they saw could be described as butterfly people, some comparing their alleged experiences to religious visions along with reporting the entities they saw as larger than the average human and female. Close to one half of the children speaking as witnesses to these extraordinary encounters were counseled at nearby trauma centers set up in local schools where the phenomena they experienced was discounted as mental coping mechanisms created because of stress the witnesses experienced at the time of the disaster.

== In popular culture ==
=== Books ===
In October 2011, The Joplin Globe released a hardcover pictorial book titled 32 Minutes in May: The Joplin Tornado. On August 25, 2015, the historical fiction children's novel I Survived the Joplin Tornado, 2011 by Lauren Tarshis was released.

=== Documentaries ===
A number of documentaries have been produced about the Joplin tornado and its effects on the city. These include Heartland: A Portrait of Survival, directed by Erica Tremblay and featured at the Omaha Film Festival and the St. Louis International Film Festival, as well as Deadline in Disaster (directed by Beth Pike), which followed the staff of The Joplin Globe in the tornado's aftermath and received a regional Emmy in the Documentary-Cultural category during the 37th Mid-America Emmy Awards.

==== The Twister: Caught in the Storm ====
In March 2025, Netflix released a feature-length documentary on the tornado, titled The Twister: Caught in the Storm. Residents of Joplin who recalled the storm were interviewed for the documentary. Director-writer Alexandra Lacey told The Hollywood Reporter, "It was a difficult prospect to find the characters and make sure that we were treating each one of them the right way and making them feel comfortable to tell their story. [...] What really struck me was the lasting mental health impact on the folks there in Joplin. Every time the wind gets stronger, or the sirens go... It’s really hard.”

== See also ==
- Weather of 2011
- List of North American tornadoes and tornado outbreaks
- List of F5, EF5, and IF5 tornadoes
- List of deadliest tornadoes in the Americas
- Tornado intensity
- Tornado records

Preceded by Tuscaloosa–Birmingham, AL (2011)	Costliest U.S. tornadoes on Record; May 22, 2011	Succeeded by -
