= Marcella Ng =

First African American woman pilot in the United States Armed Forces

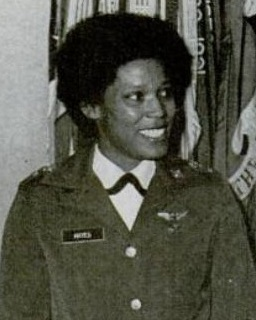
Marcella Ng (then 2nd Lt. Hayes) in November 1979

Marcella Ann Ng (born July 24, 1956) was the first African American woman pilot in the United States Armed Forces.

== Life ==
Marcella, born Marcella Ann Hayes, was born in 1956 in Mexico, Missouri. She was raised by her grandparents in Centralia, Missouri. She graduated from Hickman High School in Columbia, Missouri in 1974. She received her bachelor's degree in English from the University of Wisconsin–Madison in 1978. She initially wanted to become a doctor. She joined the army in 1978. She is married to Dennis Ng and the couple has three children.

== Career ==
Marcella joined the ROTC in her second semester of college, and joined the army in 1978 after graduating from college. On November 27, 1979, at the U.S. Army Aviation Center at Fort Rucker, Alabama, she became the first black woman, and the 55th woman, to become a pilot in the United States Armed Forces. She went on to serve 22 years in the army, and retired in 2000 as a lieutenant colonel. In 2022 she was inducted into the University of Wisconsin-Madison Army ROTC Hall of Fame.
