= Sara Parker Pauley =

Conservationist

9th Director of the Missouri Department of Conservation
- Incumbent
- Assumed office 1 November 2016
- Preceded by: Robert Ziehmer

Director of the Missouri Department of Natural Resources
- Retired
- In office 2010–2016

Sara Parker Pauley is the former director of the Missouri Department of Conservation and former president of the Association of Fish & Wildlife Agencies. In each of those roles she was the first woman to serve.

== Education ==
Pauley grew up in Columbia, Missouri and was interested in conservation from a young age. She received her secondary education at Hickman High School in Columbia, Missouri. Pauley attended the University of Missouri earning both a bachelor's degree in journalism and a law degree.

== Career ==
After her education, Pauley worked for the conservation engagement company D.J. Case & Associates and as a policy analyst for the Missouri Department of Conservation. In 2010, Pauley was appointed to serve as director of the Missouri Department of Natural Resources, a position she held for six years. In 2016, Pauley was appointed as director of the Missouri Department of Conservation, a position she retains as of 2022. She is the first woman to hold the position of director. She has led the effort to establish the Boone County Nature School at Three Creeks Conservation Area. and views this as one of her favorite projects.

In 2020 she was elected to a one-year term as president of the Association of Fish & Wildlife Agencies.

Pauley has also served as an executive-in-residence at the University of Missouri. She has spoken about water quality issues and natural areas while in that role.

Pauley has talked about her work in multiple venues. In 2021, she elaborated about the collaborative effort needed for conservation efforts in an article in a Nature Conservancy publication, and shared changes in how people think about conservation. She spoke before the United States Senate in support of the 2021 Recovering America's Wildlife Act, and has worked with Senator Roy Blunt to share the bill with people from Missouri.

Parker is included in a 2021 book by Francis Nenik that details the administration of Donald Trump.

== Awards and honors ==
In 2012 Pauley was named one of two "Conservation Partners of the Year" by Bass Pro Shops. In 2016, she received the President's Award from the Environmental Council of States. In 2017, the Columbia Public Schools Foundation named Pauley as an outstanding alumni. In 2019 she accepted the Governor's Award for Innovation on behalf of the Missouri Department of Conservation’s (MDC) Discover Nature Schools program.
