= The Joplin Globe =

American newspaper in Missouri, founded 1896

- Type: Daily newspaper
- Format: Broadsheet
- Owner(s): CNHI, LLC
- Publisher: Josh Umholtz
- Editor: Andy Ostmeyer
- Founded: 1896 (130 years ago)
- Headquarters: 2613 South Main Street Suite D, Joplin, Missouri 64804 United States
- Circulation: 30,000 circulation (as of July 2012)
- Website: www.joplinglobe.com

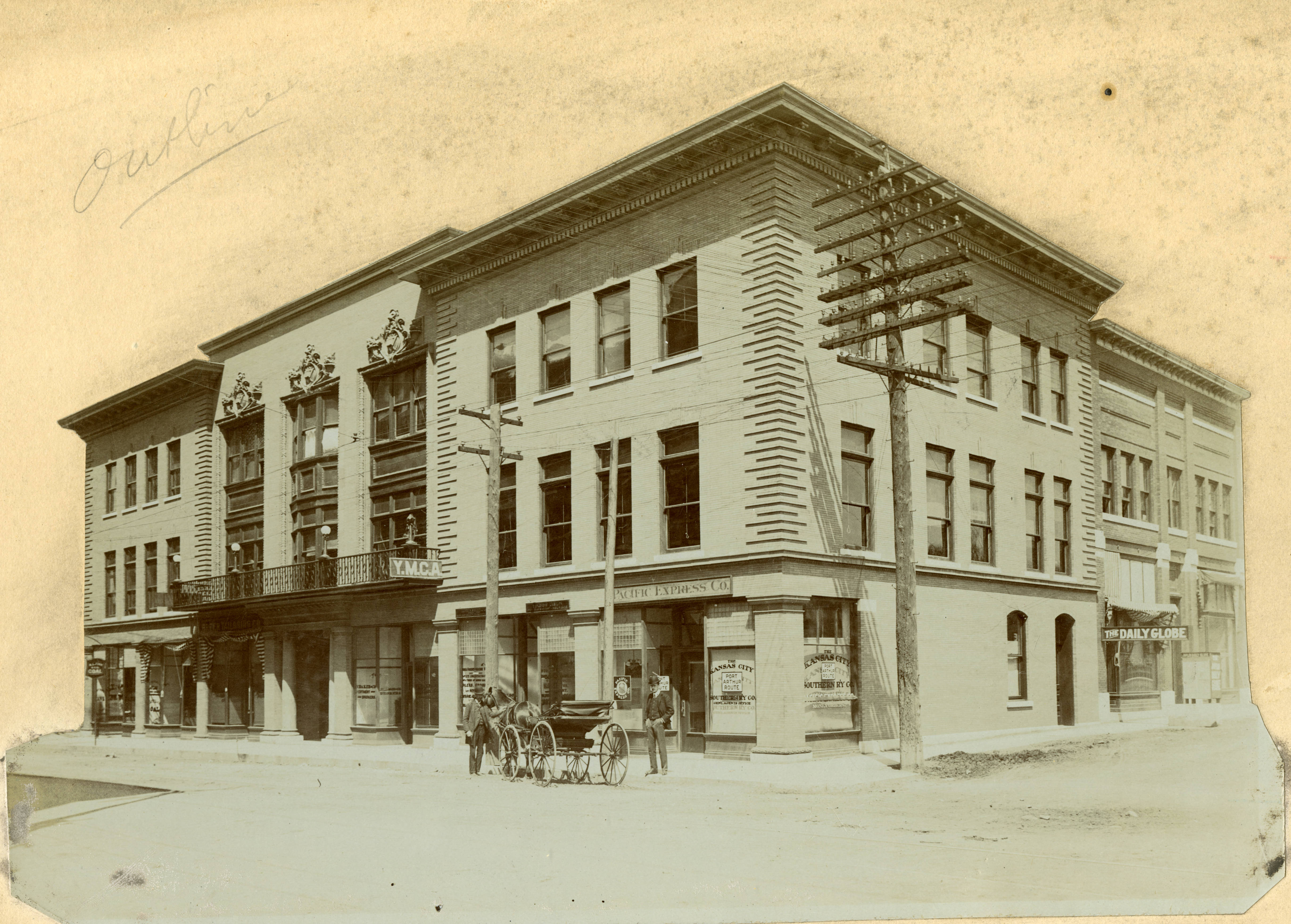
View of exterior of Fourth Street, between Main and Virginia, showing Pacific Express Company, Y.M.C.A. and Joplin Daily Globe. The State Historical Society of Missouri.

The Joplin Globe is a five-day digital edition and five-day print edition daily newspaper published in Joplin, Missouri, United States, covering parts of 14 counties in southwestern Missouri. Ottaway Community Newspapers owned the Globe from 1975 to 2002. Since 2002, it has been owned by CNHI.

The first issue of The Globe was published on August 9, 1896. Its marketing slogan was "It's your world. We deliver it." In 2012, The Globe was named "Newspaper of the Year" by the Local Media Association.

== Bonnie and Clyde scoop ==
In 1933, The Joplin Globe had a country-wide scoop, obtaining the camera left behind by Bonnie and Clyde after a deadly confrontation with local police, developing and publishing the rolls of film in it, including the now-legendary photos of Bonnie Parker holding Clyde Barrow at mock gunpoint and of Bonnie with her foot on a fender, pistol in her hand, and cigar in her mouth.

== Founder ==
Gilbert Barbee was born in 1850 in Ritchey, Newton County, Missouri. Barbee made his fortune in lead mining and owned the Joplin Globe from 1899 to 1911. He later established and published the Joplin Tribune. Barbee was an active member of the Democratic Party and he owned the Barbee Park racetrack and the House of Lords pub. Barbee also donated money and land to build the Children's Home, an orphanage in Joplin. He died in 1924 in Joplin, Jasper County, Missouri.
