= Columbia Public Schools =

School district in Missouri, U.S.

Location
- Columbia, Boone County, Missouri; United States; 38°57′37″N 92°21′58″W

Information
- Type: School District

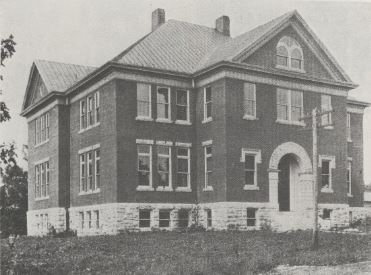
The original Columbia High School Building

Columbia 93 School District, also known as the Columbia Public School District, is located in Columbia, Boone County, Missouri. The district is Accredited with Distinction by the Missouri Department of Elementary and Secondary Education.
Columbia Public Schools is the fourth largest school district in Missouri. It includes 22 elementary schools, seven middle schools, four high schools and the Columbia Area Career Center, as well as an early childhood education program, and the Boone County Nature School. The district has two separate segregated day programs for students with IEPs in grades K-12 called Bethel Center and Roseta Learning Center. Total enrollment is 18,270 students for the 2025–26 school year. The school district is accredited by the Missouri Department of Elementary and Secondary Education. The current Superintendent, Dr. Jeff Klein, started with the district on July 1, 2025.

Prior to 2013, there were three middle schools for grades 6-7 and three junior high schools for grades 8–9. With the opening of Battle High School, 9th grade was able to move to high school and all six schools became middle schools for grades 6–8.

The seventh middle school, John Warner Middle School, opened its doors in the 2020 school year.

The district includes almost all of the Columbia city limits, and it includes all of Huntsdale, McBaine, and Pierpont, along with unincorporated areas.

== Schools ==
=== Elementary (K–5) ===
- Alpha Hart Lewis Elementary School
- Benton STEM Elementary School (formerly Benton Elementary School)
- Beulah Ralph Elementary School
- Blue Ridge Elementary School
- Cedar Ridge Elementary School
- Center for Gifted Education - Enrichment and Extension (formerly Eugene Field Elementary School)
- Derby Ridge Elementary School
- Eagle Bluffs Elementary School
- Eliot Battle Elementary School
- Fairview Elementary School
- U.S. Grant Elementary School
- Locust Street Expressive Arts Elementary School (formerly Robert E. Lee Elementary School)
- Midway Heights Elementary School
- Mill Creek Elementary School
- New Haven Elementary School
- Mary Paxton Keeley Elementary School
- Parkade Elementary School
- Ridgeway Elementary School
- Rock Bridge Elementary School
- Russell Boulevard Elementary School
- Shepard Boulevard Elementary School
- Two Mile Prairie Elementary School
- West Boulevard Elementary School

=== Middle schools (6–8) ===
- Gentry Middle School
- Jefferson Middle School: A STEAM Academy (formerly, Jefferson Middle School, Jefferson Junior High School, and Columbia High School)
- Lange Middle School
- Oakland Middle School (formerly Oakland Junior High School)
- Smithton Middle School
- West Middle School (formerly West Junior High School)
- John Warner Middle School

=== High schools (9–12) ===
- David H. Hickman High School
- Rock Bridge High School
- Douglass High School
- Muriel Williams Battle High School
- Columbia Area Career Center

=== Segregated Separate Day Schools for Students with IEPs (K–12) ===
- Bethel Street Center (formerly knowns as CORE, or Quest South)
- Roseta Learning Center (also known as Quest East)
