= Battle High School =

Muriel Williams Battle High School

Location
- 7575 East St. Charles Road; Columbia, Missouri 65202; United States; 38°58′08″N 92°13′24″W

Information
- Other name: Battle
- Type: Public high school
- Motto: "It's a Great Day to be a Spartan"
- Established: 2013
- School district: Columbia Public Schools
- Superintendent: Dr. Jeff Klein
- NCES School ID: 290100003239
- Principal: Alyssa Galbreath
- Teaching staff: 110.53 (on an FTE basis)
- Grades: 9–12
- Enrollment: 1,492 (2024–2025)
- Student to teacher ratio: 13.50
- Colors: Navy and Gold
- Mascot: Spartan
- Newspaper: The Spearhead
- Website: bhs.cpsk12.org

Muriel Williams Battle High School (commonly known as Battle) is a public high school in Columbia, Missouri, United States. It opened for summer school on June 3, 2013, and began its first school year in August 2013. The school serves students in grades 9–12 and has a preschool classroom., although seniors did not attend the first year of operation. It is one of four public high schools in the Columbia Public Schools district.

== History ==
Columbia's population growth was well over 20% between the 2000 and 2010 censuses. Due to this rapid growth, the city passed a $120 million bond issue in April 2010, partially to fund a new high school.

The school was named in honor of Dr. Muriel Battle, the first African-American principal for Columbia Public Schools who helped end racial segregation for the school district. A committee discussed whether to name the school after Dr Battle and her husband, but her husband requested that his name not to be added. There were also guidelines discouraging naming places after living people. The name for the school was approved in November 2010.

The school officially opened its doors for summer school on June 3, 2013, to 475 students.

== Athletics ==
The following sports are offered to students at Battle:

- Baseball (boys, spring season)
- Basketball (boys and girls, winter season)
- Cross country (boys and girls, fall season)
- Cheerleading (boys and girls)
- Football (11-man)
- Golf (boys and girls, spring season)
- Softball (girls, fall season)
- Soccer (boys and girls, fall/spring season)
- Swimming & diving (boys and girls, winter season)
- Tennis (boys and girls, fall/spring season)
- Track & field (boys and girls, spring season)
- Volleyball (boys and girls, fall season)
- Wrestling (boys and girls, winter season)
- Stunt (girls)

== Performing arts ==
Battle has four choirs. The mixed-gender "Battalion" functions as both a concert choir and a competitive show choir. "Apollo" is a concert choir for tenor/bass voices, and "Siren Sound" and "Voices of Sparta" are concert treble choirs. The program also hosts its own competition every year, BattleFest.
