= Joplin Police Department =

Agency overview
- Formed: 1873
- Employees: 112

Jurisdictional structure
- Operations jurisdiction: United States
- Legal jurisdiction: Joplin, Missouri

Operational structure
- Agency executive: Richard Pearson, Chief

Website
- www.joplinmo.org/163/Police-Department

The Joplin Police Department (JPD) is the principal law enforcement agency responsible for serving the city of Joplin in the U.S. state of Missouri.The Joplin Police Department currently employs 112 Police Officers. The department maintains a fleet of Dodge Chargers and Chevy Tahoes. The Joplin Police Department is the largest law enforcement agency in Jasper County, Missouri.

== Department structure and history ==
The Joplin Police Department was created in 1873, and is responsible for providing law enforcement services to a major population center in Southwest Missouri encompassing approximately 50,000 city residents and 200,000 daily visitors through its patrol, investigations, administration, special enforcement, and support services bureaus which report to the Chief of Police, and previously to the Police Marshal. According to the Officer Down Memorial Page, 21 officers have been killed in the line of duty in the department's history.

Officers are issued Glock pistols as their primary sidearm, in recent years JPD has upgraded to the 9mm Glock due to improved ballistics and the FBI going to 9mm.

== Marshals and chiefs ==
Individuals who have served as marshal or chief of the Joplin Police Department since its creation in 1873 have included the following

- J. William Lupton (1873–1875)
- John Frederick Bair (1875–1876)
- L. Cass Hamilton (1876–1886)
- Calvin Nickell (1886–1887)
- J.J. Cofer (1887–1892, first term)
- John Alexander McManamy (1893–1896, first term)
- W.E. Morgan (1897–1898)
- John Alexander McManamy (1899–1900, second term)
- Thomas James Cofer (1901–1903)
- John Alexander McManamy (1903–1905, third term)
- Joseph H. Myers (1905–1909, first term)
- John Alexander McManamy (1909-1910, fourth term)
- Joseph H. Myers (1911–1914, second term)
- Henry N. Milligan (1914–1917)
- J.J. Cofer (1917–1918, second term)
- Joseph H. Myers (1918–1922, third term)
- Vern P. Hine (1922–1924)
- William F. Gibson (1924–1925)
- Luther M. Laster (1925–1926)
- Bert Blizzard (1926)
- Arch McDonald (1926–1928)
- Guy Harrington (1928–1934)
- Henry Mead (1934–1937)
- Joseph W. Pratt (1937–1938)
- Barney Walker (1938–1941, first term)
- Tony Calvin Bone (1941, first term)
- Barney Walker (1941–1942, second term)
- Tony Calvin Bone (1942–1943, second term)
- Henry Vermillion (1943–1945)
- Kendrick Lloyd (1945–1948)
- Roy E. Isgrigg (1948–1950, first term)
- T. Frank Martin (1950–1951)
- John T. Hollis (1951–1952)
- Roy E. Isgrigg (1952–1962, second term)
- Walter H. Flenner (1962–1965)
- Adrian Lacy Meacham (1965–1972)
- Bernard Kakuske (1972–1977)
- Larry D. Tennis (1977–1986)
- David McCracken (1986)
- Michael J. Wightman (1986–1991)
- David R. Nieber (1992–1998)
- Edward G. Dennis (1998–2002)
- Kevin Lindsey (2002–2006)
- Lane J. Roberts (2007–2014)
- Jason Burns (2014–2016)
- Matthew Stewart (2016 - 2021)
- Sloan Rowland (2021-2023)
- Brian Lewis (2023)
- Richard Pearson (2023–Present)
