= Frederick Douglass High School (Columbia, Missouri) =

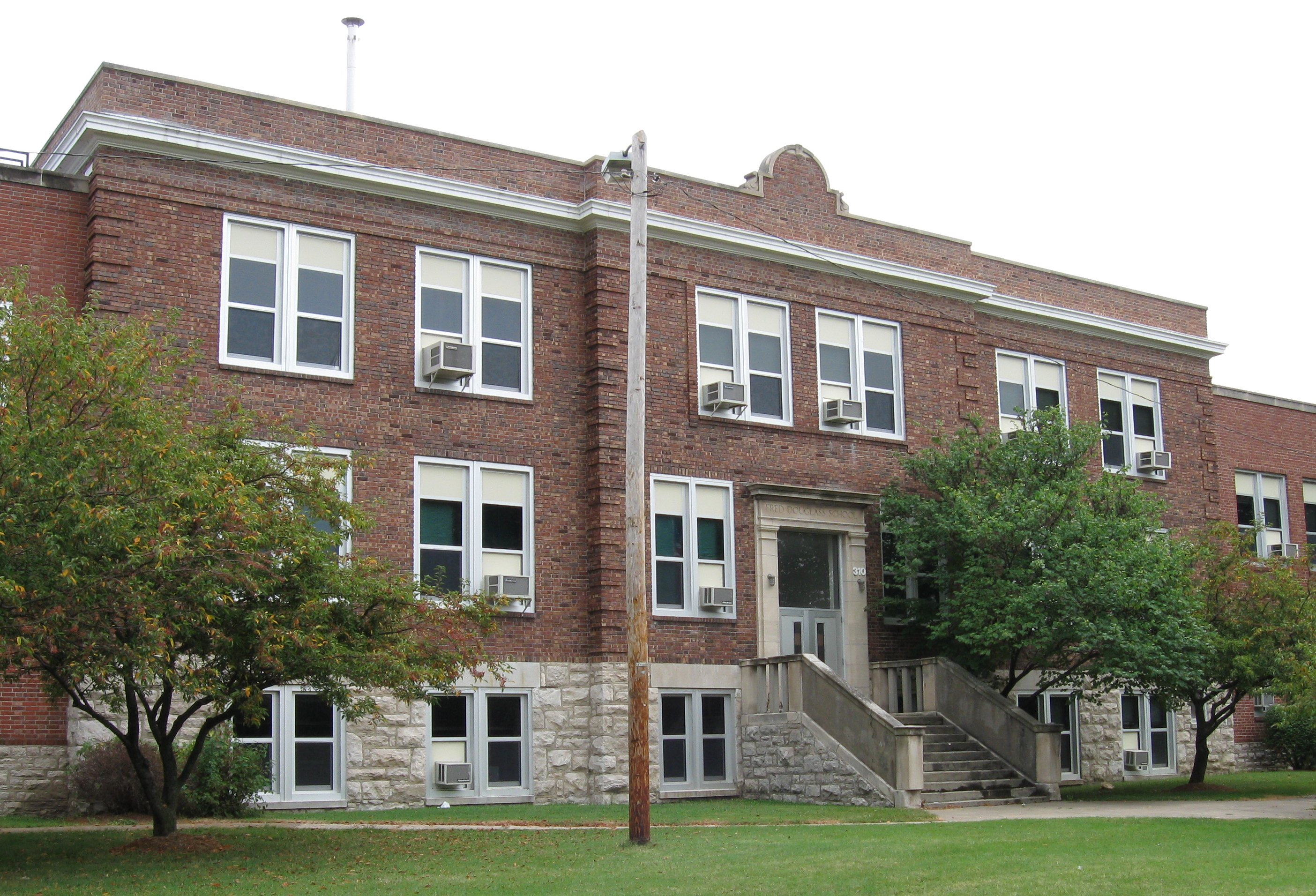
- 310 North Providence Road; Columbia, Missouri 65203; United States

Information
- Type: Public Secondary
- Established: 1916
- School district: Columbia Public Schools
- Superintendent: Brian Yearwood
- Principal: Eryca Neville
- Grades: 9-12
- Campus type: Urban
- Colors: Blue and White
- Athletics: Basketball
- Athletics conference: Independent
- Mascot: Bulldog
- Information: (573) 214-3680
- Website: Douglass High School
- Fred Douglass School
- U.S. National Register of Historic Places
- Location within Missouri Location within the United States
- Location: 310 N. Providence Rd., Columbia, Missouri
- Coordinates: 38°57′18″N 92°19′59″W
- Area: less than one acre
- Built: 1917
- Architectural style: Classical Revival
- MPS: Social Institutions of Columbia's Black Community TR
- NRHP reference No.: 80002310
- Added to NRHP: September 4, 1980

Frederick Douglass High School is an alternative public high school located in Columbia, Missouri. Douglass enrolls students 9-12 from throughout the Columbia Public Schools District. The school competes in MSHSAA 4A. Their sports include basketball and track and field. The school differs from typical high schools due to providing programs including child development and parenting classes and a day care facility. It was built in 1917, and is a two-story, Classical Revival style brick building on a raised basement. The building was listed on the National Register of Historic Places in 1980 as Fred Douglass School. Recently, it was closed, restored, and modernized, reopening in the Fall of 2017. It is one of four High Schools in the Columbia Public School District.
