= Ozark (disambiguation) =

The Ozarks is a highland region in Missouri, Arkansas, Oklahoma, and Kansas, United States.

Ozark may also refer to:

== Places ==
- Ozark, Alabama, a city
- Ozark, Arkansas, a city
- Ozark, Illinois, an unincorporated community
- Ozark, Kentucky, an unincorporated community
- Ozark Township (disambiguation)
- Ozark Trail (disambiguation)

=== Missouri ===
- Lake Ozark, Missouri, a city
- Lake of the Ozarks, a reservoir
  - Lake of the Ozarks State Park, a public recreation area
- Ozark, Missouri, a city
- Ozark County, Missouri
- List of Missouri conservation areas – Ozark region

== Arts and entertainment ==
- The Ozark Mountain Daredevils, a band formed in 1972 in Springfield, Missouri, US
- "Ozark", a track on the album As Falls Wichita, So Falls Wichita Falls by Pat Metheny and Lyle Mays
- Ozark Music Festival, a rock music festival that took place in 1974 in Sedalia, Missouri, US
- Ozark (TV series), an American crime drama web television series

== People ==
- Ozark Henry (born 1970), Belgian musician
- Ozark Ripley (1872–1940), American fisherman and huntsman
- Danny Ozark (1923–2009), American baseball manager

== Other uses ==
- Ozark Air Lines, a defunct airline in the United States
- Ozark Division, a nickname of the US 102nd Infantry Division
- Ozark FC, former name of an amateur association football team
- Ozark High School (disambiguation)
- USS Ozark (disambiguation), several ships of the US Navy

== See also ==
- Henry Shaw Ozark Corridor, conservation areas in Missouri, US
- Ozark Highlands AVA, an American Viticultural Area in Missouri
- Ozark Mountain AVA, an American Viticultural Area in Arkansas, Missouri, and Oklahoma
- Ozark National Scenic Riverways, a US national park
- Ozark–St. Francis National Forest, a US National Forest in Arkansas
- Ozark spiderwort (Tradescantia ozarkana), native to Missouri, Arkansas, and Oklahoma, US
