= Missouri's 19th Senate district =

American legislative district

Missouri's 19th State Senate district
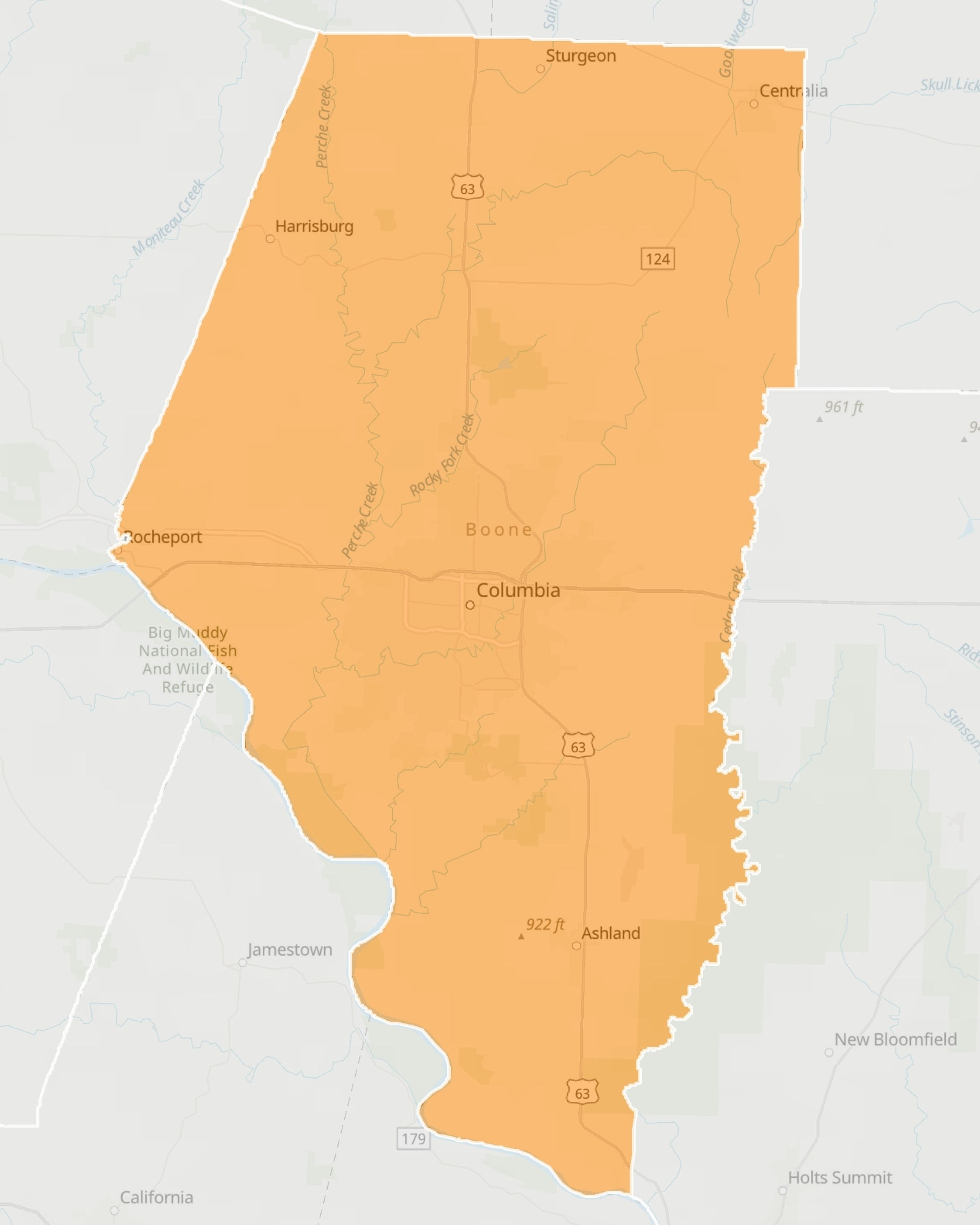
Senator
Stephen Webber; D–Columbia
- Demographics: 76% White; 9% Black; 4% Hispanic; 5% Asian; 5% Multiracial
- Population (2023): 185,874

Missouri's 19th Senatorial District is one of 34 districts in the Missouri Senate. The district has been represented by Democrat Stephen Webber since 2025.

== Geography ==
The district is in central Missouri and encompasses the entirety of Boone County, which includes the major city of Columbia, its surrounding suburbs, and several outlying small towns. Those include Ashland, Centralia, Hallsville, Rocheport, and Sturgeon. The district is also home to the University of Missouri, Columbia College, the State Historical Society of Missouri, and numerous state parks and conservation areas.

== Election results (1996–2024) ==
=== 1996 ===
Missouri's 19th Senatorial District election (1996)
Party	Candidate	Votes	%
Democratic	Ken Jacob	39,971	62.43
Republican	Frank Martin	21,703	33.90
Libertarian	Daniel Dodson	2,353	3.68
Total votes		64,027	100.00

=== 2000 ===
Missouri's 19th Senatorial District election (2000)
Party	Candidate	Votes	%
Democratic	Ken Jacob (incumbent)	41,426	57.64
Republican	Randy Asbury	29,152	40.56
Libertarian	John Dupuy	1,293	1.80
Total votes		71,871	100.00
Democratic hold			

=== 2004 ===
Missouri's 19th Senatorial District election (2004)
Party	Candidate	Votes	%
Democratic	Chuck Graham	43,955	52.55
Republican	Q. Michael Ditmore	39,691	47.45
Total votes		83,646	100.00
Democratic hold			

=== 2008 ===
Missouri's 19th Senatorial District election (2008)
Party	Candidate	Votes	%
Republican	Kurt Schaefer	44,265	48.49
Democratic	Chuck Graham (incumbent)	42,732	46.81
Libertarian	Christopher W. Dwyer	4,286	4.70
Total votes		91,283	100.00
Republican gain from Democratic			

=== 2012 ===
Missouri's 19th Senatorial District election (2012)
Party	Candidate	Votes	%
Republican	Kurt Schaefer (incumbent)	47,067	57.91
Democratic	Mary Wynne Still	34,216	42.09
Total votes		81,283	100.00
Republican hold			

=== 2016 ===
Missouri's 19th Senatorial District election (2016)
Party	Candidate	Votes	%
Republican	Caleb Rowden	45,335	51.22
Democratic	Stephen Webber	43,179	48.78
Total votes		88,514	100.00
Republican hold			

=== 2020 ===
Missouri's 19th Senatorial District election (2020)
Party	Candidate	Votes	%
Republican	Caleb Rowden (incumbent)	50,570	51.60
Democratic	Judy Baker	47,367	48.33
Write-In	James Coyne	72	0.07
Total votes		98,009	100.00
Republican hold			

=== 2024 ===
Missouri's 19th Senatorial District election (2024)
Party	Candidate	Votes	%
Democratic	Stephen Webber	48,998	56.97
Republican	James Coyne	37,010	43.03
Total votes		86,008	100.00
Democratic gain from Republican			

== Statewide election results ==
Year	Office	Results
2008	President	Obama 55.1 – 43.2%
2012	President	Obama 51.6 – 48.4%
2016	President	Clinton 49.3 – 43.4%
2016	Senate	Kander 54.3 – 41.1%
2016	Governor	Koster 54.9 – 41.3%
2018	Senate	McCaskill 56.3 – 40.8%
2020	President	Biden 54.9 – 42.4%
2020	Governor	Galloway 53.0 – 44.6%
