= Cabinet of Missouri =

Missouri Government
Governor of Missouri	Mike Kehoe (R)
Lieutenant Governor of Missouri:	David Wasinger (R)
Missouri Secretary of State:	Denny Hoskins (R)
Cabinet of Missouri
Missouri State Auditor:	Scott Fitzpatrick (R)
Missouri State Treasurer:	Vivek Malek (R)
Missouri Attorney General:	Catherine Hanaway (R)
United States Senator:	Josh Hawley (R)
United States Senator:	Eric Schmitt (R)

The Cabinet of the governor of Missouri is a body of the most senior appointed officials of the executive branch of the government of Missouri. Originally an informal meeting between the governor of Missouri and various government officials, the Governor's Cabinet has evolved into an important information link between the governor and the various agencies, boards and commissions that operate within state government.

Cabinet officers are appointed by the governor, subject to confirmation by the Missouri Senate. Once confirmed, all members of the Cabinet receive the title "Secretary" and serve at the pleasure of the governor. The Cabinet is responsible for advising the governor on the operations and policies of the State government.

The current Cabinet is serving under Governor Mike Kehoe.

== Current cabinet departments ==
The Missouri State Cabinet, under current Governor Mike Kehoe, consists of 16 departments each headed by an official appointed by the Governor.

The current (as of January 2025) cabinet is appointed by Mike Kehoe.

Cabinet of Missouri
Agency	Name	Date of confirmation by senate
Missouri Office of Administration	Kenneth J. Zellers	March 10, 2022
Missouri Department of Agriculture	Chris Chinn	January 29, 2017
Missouri Department of Conservation	Steven D. Harrison	July 1, 2019
Missouri Department of Corrections	Trevor Foley	December 6, 2023
Missouri Department of Economic Development	Michelle Hataway	September 9, 2022
Missouri Department of Elementary and Secondary Education	Lisa Sireno	October 2026
Missouri Department of Health and Senior Services	Paula F. Nickelson	June 2023
Missouri Department of Higher Education	Bennett Boggs	February 22, 2023
Missouri Department of Commerce and Insurance	Chlora Lindley-Myers	March 6, 2017
Missouri Department of Labor and Industrial Relations	Anna Hui	January 18, 2018
Missouri Department of Mental Health	Valerie Huhn	December 9, 2021
Missouri National Guard	Levon E. Cumpton	August 2, 2019 (appointed directly)
Missouri Department of Natural Resources	Dru Buntin	August 2021
Missouri Department of Public Safety	Mark S. James	appointed directly
Missouri Department of Revenue	Wayne Wallingford	December 29, 2021
Missouri Department of Social Services	Robert J. Knodell	June 2, 2023
Missouri Department of Transportation	Patrick K. McKenna	December 2015
