= Cheri Toalson Reisch =

American politician

John Martin

Member of the Missouri House of Representatives from the 44th district
- In office January 2017 – January 8, 2025
- Preceded by: Caleb Rowden
- Succeeded by: John Martin

Personal details
- Party: Republican

Cheri Toalson Reisch is an American politician who was a member of the Missouri House of Representatives from 2017 to 2025, representing District 44. Reisch is a member of the Republican Party.

Reisch was an unsuccessful candidate for Boone County District II commissioner in 2024.

== Career ==
Reisch previously served as mayor and city clerk/court administrator for Hallsville, Missouri. She ran for county collector in 2014. She also manages several properties in Hallsville and manages the Cline, Braddock, and Basinger Law Office in Columbia.

=== Missouri House of Representatives ===
Reisch endorsed the right-to-work law in her 2016 campaign, later signed into law by Eric Greitens and overturned by voters in a ballot initiative. In her first two years, she voted in favor of tax cuts, abortion restrictions, and reversed Greitens cuts to higher education.

Reisch was sued for blocking a constituent on Twitter as of 11 December 2018. In June 2018, Reisch tweeted that it was "sad to see" her 2018 election opponent, veterinarian Maren Bell Jones, put her hands behind her back during the Pledge of Allegiance at a Boone County Farm Bureau event that both candidates attended. The constituent was then blocked on Twitter after he retweeted a post by State Representative Kip Kendrick, D-Columbia, that criticized Reisch's statement.

In 2021, Reisch sponsored a bill to restore parole for 35 people incarcerated under outdated drug laws. The House bill, turned Senate amendment, was mistakenly deleted and did not make it into law. She re-filed the bill in 2022.

In August 2022, Reisch falsely claimed on Facebook that students at Columbia Public Schools dressed as animals were using litterboxes as bathrooms. She reiterated the false claim two days later during an event with governor Mike Parson; when asked for evidence, she refused, claiming a need to protect "confidential sources". Earlier in the year, Reisch was criticized for saying "Columbia sucks," referring to the public school system, in a House Education Committee meeting.

In 2023, Reisch pushed a ballot initiative to freeze property taxes. Following a law passed by Parson, Boone County Commission has the authority to implement the tax freeze without election, and was in the process of assessing the eligibility and implications.

In 2024, Reisch sponsored a bill to expand charter schools to St. Louis County, St. Charles County and Boone County, however stated that she is "not necessarily" supportive of charter schools. Reisch supported a bill that would make voter ballot initiatives for constitutional amendments more difficult to pass. She stated the bill would combat fraud, due to her belief that many signatures were from deceased people. Reisch testified in support of a bill that would remove restrictions on child labor for Missouri, claiming that she started working at age 9 and through high school. She went on to say that the majority of "kids of today" are lazy.

== Personal life ==
Reisch is the sixth-generation of her family to live in Boone County, her ancestors having settled in the county in the 1810s.

== Electoral history ==
- Cheri Toalson Reisch has not yet had any opponents in the Republican primaries that she entered, thus getting nominated each time by default.

Missouri House of Representatives Election, November 8, 2016, District 44
| Party | Candidate | Votes | % | ±% |
|---|---|---|---|---|
| Republican | Cheri Toalson Reisch | 9,200 | 55.73% | |
| Democratic | Tom Pauley | 7,309 | 44.27% | |
| Total votes | | 16,509 | 100.00% | |

Missouri House of Representatives Election, November 6, 2018, District 44
| Party | Candidate | Votes | % | ±% |
|---|---|---|---|---|
| Republican | Cheri Toalson Reisch | 8,365 | 56.51% | +0.78 |
| Democratic | Maren Bell Jones | 6,437 | 43.49% | −0.78 |
| Total votes | | 14,802 | 100.00% | |

Missouri House of Representatives Election, November 3, 2020, District 44
| Party | Candidate | Votes | % | ±% |
|---|---|---|---|---|
| Republican | Cheri Toalson Reisch | 10,737 | 59.37% | +2.86 |
| Democratic | Jacque Sample | 7,348 | 40.63% | −2.86 |
| Total votes | | 18,085 | 100.00% | |

Missouri House of Representatives Election, November 8, 2022, District 44
| Party | Candidate | Votes | % | ±% |
|---|---|---|---|---|
| Republican | Cheri Toalson Reisch | 9,021 | 62.58% | +3.21 |
| Democratic | Dave Raithel | 5,393 | 37.42% | −3.21 |
| Total votes | | 14,414 | 100.00% | |

Boone County, Missouri County District II Commissioner, November 5, 2024
| Party | Candidate | Votes | % | ±% |
|---|---|---|---|---|
| Republican | Cheri Toalson Reisch | 18,056 | 47.56% | |
| Democratic | Janet Thompson | 19,887 | 52.38% | |
| Total votes | | 37,961 | 100.00% | |
