= Missouri Boys State =

Youth organizations based in Missouri

- Abbreviation: MBS
- Formation: March 1938
- Type: Not-For-Profit Corporation
- Legal status: Active
- Headquarters: Warrensburg, MO
- Location: Lindenwood University
- Region served: Missouri
- Members: 60,000+
- Official language: English
- Director: Jack Laskowitz
- Parent organization: American Legion
- Affiliations: American Legion Department of Missouri
- Staff: 2
- Volunteers: 200+
- Website: http://www.moboysstate.org

Missouri Boys State is an 8-day youth program held each June to teach Missouri high school students leadership and the workings of government. Missouri is one of forty-nine states (all except Hawaii) with such a program for boys and a separate program for girls sponsored by The American Legion Auxiliary. The Missouri Boys State program hosts approximately 850 students, or citizens, and more than 200 volunteer staff members for 8 days on the Lindenwood University campus. During the week, the citizens of MBS create a fully functioning mock government modeled after the State of Missouri. Citizens are divided into 16 cities, with two cities per county, and into two political parties (Nationalists and Federalists).

== History ==
The concept was originally developed in Illinois in 1934 by Dr. Hays Kennedy and Harold Card, both educators and members of the Illinois American Legion. The Boys State program was designed to promote democracy, and counteract the fascist principles taught to the youth in Germany.

The individuals responsible for founding the Missouri Boys State program officially in the spring of 1938 were:

- Jerry F. Duggan (1886 - 1952)
- Harry M. Gambrel (1896 - 1962)
- Dr. Truman L. Ingle (1894 - 1954)
- A. B. Weyer (1889 - 1977)

== Notable alumni ==
- Randy Asbury (1975), former Missouri State Representative
- Scott Bakula (1972), actor
- J.T. Battenberg (1960), former president of Delphi Corporation
- Jim Bohannon (1961), broadcaster and National Radio Hall of Fame inductee
- Dennis Bonner (1981), former Missouri State Representative
- Rusty Black (1978), Missouri State Senator
- Matt Blunt (1988), former Governor of Missouri
- Richard Brown (1981), former Missouri State Representative
- Timothy Buie (1977), gastroenterologist and professor at Harvard Medical School
- Harold Caskey (1954), former Missouri State Senator
- Mike Colona (1986), former Missouri State Representative
- Scott Cupps (2002), Missouri State Representative
- Bishop Davidson (2012), Missouri State Representative
- Bob Dernier (1974), former MLB center fielder and first-base coach
- Shawn Dulohery (1982), Olympic skeet shooter
- Colin Donnell (2000), actor
- Brad Edelman (1977), former NFL offensive lineman
- Kevin Elmer (1988), former Missouri State Representative
- Kevin Engler (1976), former Missouri state legislator
- David Evans (1977), former Missouri State Representative
- Zel Fischer (1980), Missouri Supreme Court justice
- Justin Gage (1998), former NFL wide receiver
- Todd Graves (1984), former U.S. Attorney for the Western District of Missouri and Missouri Republican Party chair
- Eric Greitens (1991), former Governor of Missouri
- Kurtis Gregory (2004), Missouri State Senator
- Casey Guernsey (1998), former Missouri State Representative
- Willard Haley (1978), Missouri State Representative
- Josh Hawley (1997), United States Senator
- Bob Holden (1966), former Governor of Missouri
- Denny Hoskins (1992), Missouri Secretary of State
- Charlie James (1954), former MLB outfielder and World Series champion
- Peter Kinder (1971), former Lieutenant Governor of Missouri
- Matthew T. Kirsch (1988), former acting U.S. Attorney for the District of Colorado
- David Koechner (1979), actor
- Stan Kroenke (1964), chairman & CEO of Kroenke Sports & Entertainment (owner of multiple sports franchises)
- Ted Kulongoski (1958), former Governor of Oregon
- Bob Kustra (1960), former Lieutenant Governor of Illinois and president of both Eastern Kentucky University and Boise State University
- Dan Lanning (2003), head football coach at the University of Oregon
- George W. Lehr (1955), former Missouri State Auditor
- David Limbaugh (1970), political commentator
- Rush Limbaugh (1968), political commentator and Presidential Medal of Freedom recipient
- Stephen Limbaugh (1969), judge for the United States District Court for the Eastern District of Missouri
- Jerry Litton (1976), former United States Representative and posthumous Democratic nominee for the U.S. Senate
- Ian Mackey (2004), former Missouri State Representative
- Rocky Miller (1983), former Missouri State Representative
- Chris Molendorp (1986), former Missouri State Representative
- Scott Murphy (1987), former United States Representative
- Sherman Parker (1989), former Missouri State Representative
- Bill Phelps (1951), former Lieutenant Governor of Missouri
- Jerry Reuss (1966), former MLB pitcher and World Series champion
- Matthew T. Schelp (1987), judge for the United States District Court for the Eastern District of Missouri
- Ryan Silvey (1993), former Missouri state legislator and Missouri Public Service Commissioner
- Bill W. Stacy (1955), former president of Southeast Missouri State University and California State University, San Marcos; former chancellor of the University of Tennessee–Chattanooga
- Brad St. Louis (1994), former NFL long snapper
- Jon Sundvold (1978), former NBA shooting guard
- Limmie Pulliam (1993), operatic tenor
- Mort Walker (1941), cartoonist
- Greg Warren (1985), comedian
- David Wasinger (1980), Lieutenant Governor of Missouri
- Stephen Webber (2000), Missouri State Senator and former Missouri Democratic Party chair
- John Wiemann (1984), former Missouri State Representative
- Paul C. Wilson (1978), Missouri Supreme Court justice

== Cities ==
- Blair
- Boone
- Carnahan
- Carver
- Clark
- Crowder
- Doniphan
- Duggan
- Gambrel
- Ingle
- Kohn
- Lewis
- Pershing
- Richardson
- Weyer
- Whitfield

== George W. Lehr Memorial Chair ==
In 1988, in honor of the 50th anniversary of Missouri Boys State, the George W. Lehr Memorial Chair was introduced to MBS, giving one notable person the ability to address Boys State as that year's keynote speaker. It was named in honor of George W. Lehr, 1955 alumnus and former Missouri State Auditor, who had died earlier that year.

List of Lehr Chair speakers
Year	Recipient	Position at time
1989	William Proxmire	Former U.S. Senator from Wisconsin
1990	Robert Hyland	Regional vice president at CBS / general manager of KMOX
1991	Thomas DeFrank	White House correspondent at Newsweek
1992	Kit Bond	U.S. Senator from Missouri
1993	Chip Robertson	Chief Justice of the Missouri Supreme Court
1994	Paul Tsongas	Former U.S. Senator from Massachusetts and presidential candidate
1995	Robert Gates	Former Director of Central Intelligence
1996	Lamar Alexander	Former United States Secretary of Education and presidential candidate
1997	William J. Perry	Former United States Secretary of Defense
1998	David Gergen	Presidential advisor
1999	Emanuel Cleaver	Former mayor of Kansas City
2000	Lisa Myers	National correspondent for NBC News
2001	William Cohen	Former United States Secretary of Defense
2002	Bill Bradley	Former U.S. Senator from New Jersey and presidential candidate
2003	Mike Peters	Cartoonist and creator of Mother Goose and Grimm
2004	J. C. Watts	Former U.S. representative from Oklahoma
2005	Paul Begala	Political consultant and CNN contributor
2006	John Ashcroft	Former United States Attorney General
2007	Wesley Clark	Former Army general and presidential candidate
2008	Mike Huckabee	Former Governor of Arkansas and presidential candidate
2009	Richard Armitage	Former United States Deputy Secretary of State
2010	John Bolton	Former United States Ambassador to the United Nations
2011	John Danforth	Former United States Ambassador to the United Nations
2012	James Carville	Political consultant
2013	Bob Woodward	Investigative journalist for the Washington Post
2014	David Axelrod	Former Senior Advisor to Barack Obama
2015	Karl Rove	Former Senior Advisor to George W. Bush
2016	Jay Nixon	Governor of Missouri
2017	John O. Brennan	Former CIA Director
2018	Juan Williams	Journalist and political commentator
2019	Margaret Brennan	Journalist and moderator of Face the Nation
2020	No session held	
2021	Julian Castro	Former United States Secretary of Housing and Urban Development and presidential candidate
2022	Claire McCaskill	Former U.S. Senator from Missouri
2023	Bob Costas	Sportscaster and CNN contributor
2024	Michael Steele	Former chair of the Republican National Committee
2025	Donna Brazile	Former chair of the Democratic National Committee
2026	Joe Manchin	Former U.S. Senator from West Virginia
