= Missouri State Fair =

- Missouri State Fairgrounds Historic District
- U.S. National Register of Historic Places
- U.S. Historic district
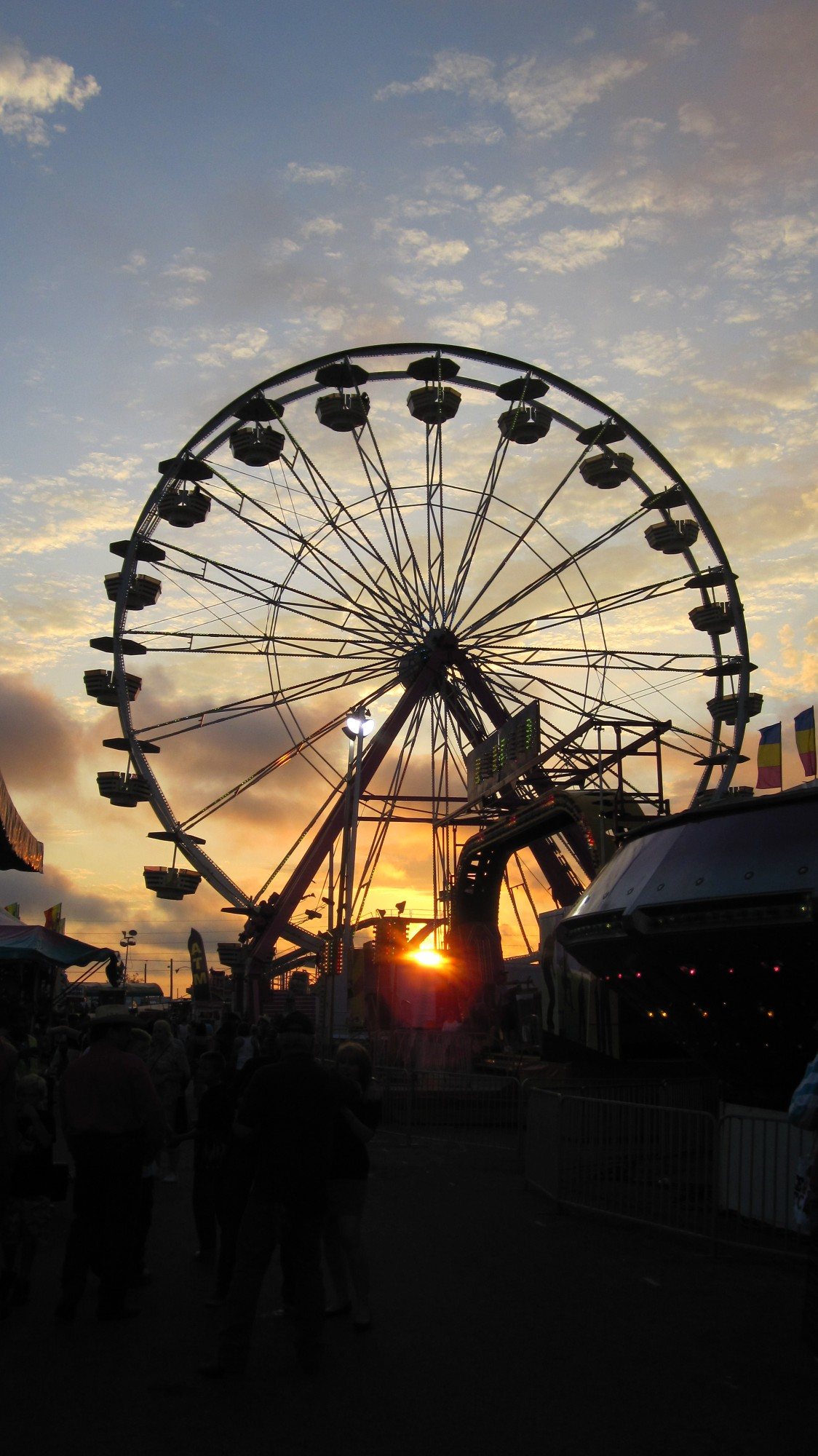
- 2011 Missouri State Fair - Ferris Wheel at Sunset

- Location within Missouri Location within the United States
- Location: Roughly bounded by US 65, Co. Rd. Y, Clarendon Rd. and the Missouri--Kansas--Texas RR tracks, Sedalia, Missouri
- Coordinates: 38°41′40″N 93°15′23″W
- Area: 215 acres (87 ha)
- Built by: Bast, Thomas W.; Et al.
- Architectural style: Art Deco, Mission/spanish Revival, Romanesque
- NRHP reference No.: 91000853
- Added to NRHP: June 28, 1991

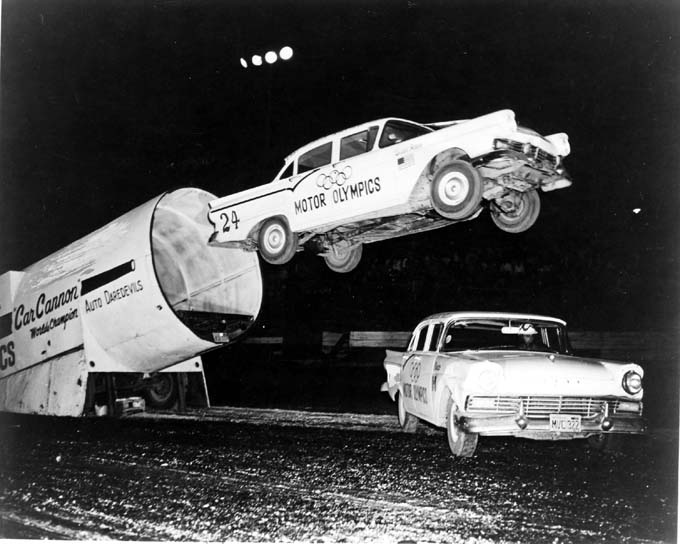
Auto daredevil show at the Missouri State Fair, 1960s

The Missouri State Fair is the state fair for the state of Missouri, which has operated since 1901 in Sedalia, Missouri. It includes daily concerts, exhibits and competitions of animals, homemade crafts, shows, and many food/lemonade stands, and it lasts 11 days. The fairgrounds are located at 2503 W 16th Street on the southwest side of the city at the intersection of West 16th Street (State Highway Y) and South Limit Avenue (U.S. Highway 65).

In 2015, the Missouri State Fair had an attendance of about 350,000 people.

== History ==
In 1897, N. H. Gentry of Sedalia persuaded the Missouri Swine Breeders Association to request the Missouri General Assembly to establish a state fair. In 1899, a resolution for the fair was introduced by C.E. Clark.

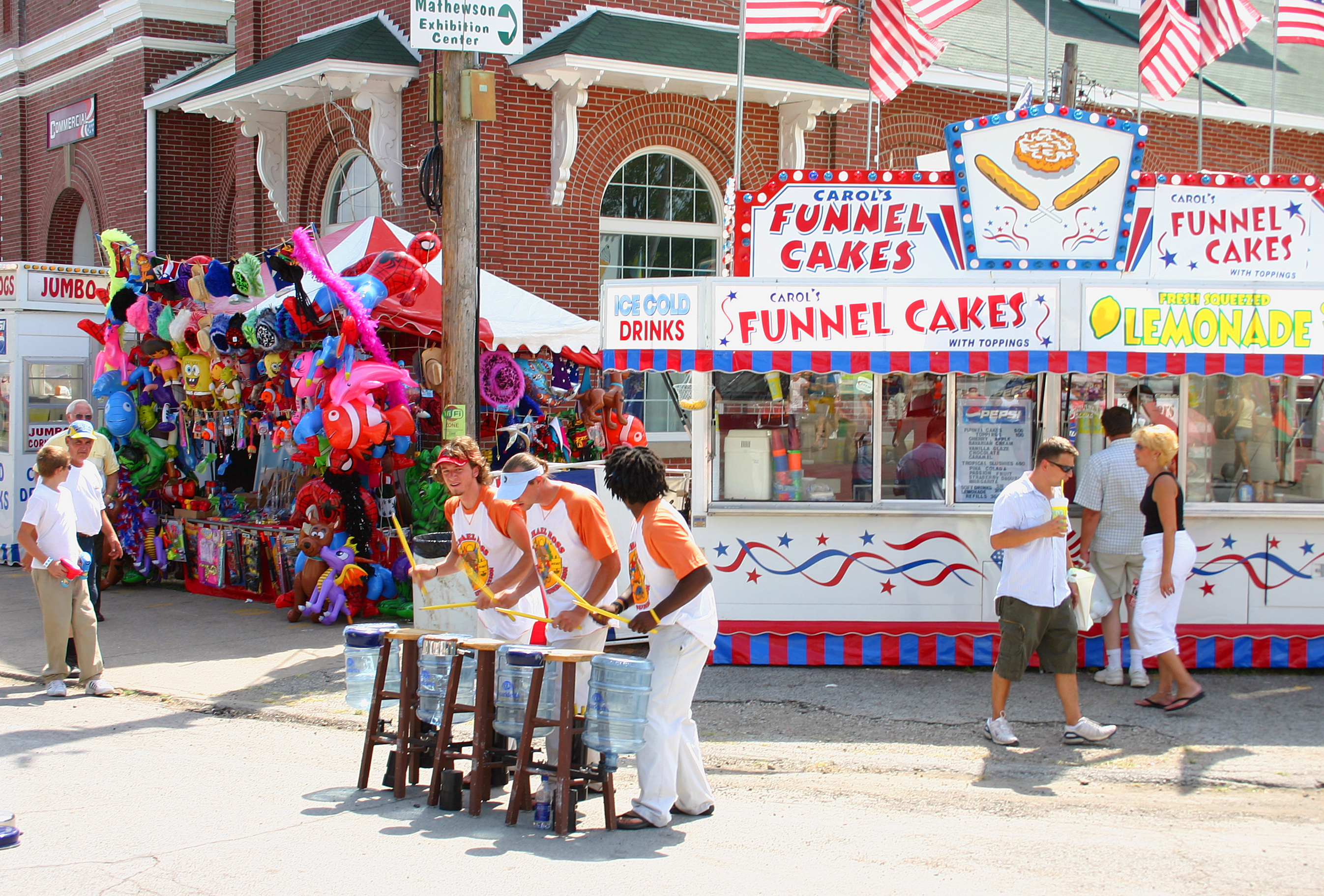
The 2005 Missouri State Fair

The state considered locating the fair in Centralia, Chillicothe, Marshall, Mexico, Moberly, and Sedalia. Cities made offers on the amounts of land they would commit to the fair.

After ten ballots, Sedalia received the majority vote; it had bid 150 acres (0.61 km^{2}), the most land of any city to be devoted to the fairgrounds. The Van Riper family, who had set land aside for the location of the Missouri State Capitol in Jefferson City, Missouri, also donated the site in Sedalia.

The first Missouri State Fair was held September 9–13 in 1901. One of the most distinctive aspects of the early fairs was the "white city": the 24 acres (97,000 m^{2}) of tents, each for rent by exhibitors.

Odessa Ice Cream was the official ice cream at the Missouri State Fair in the 1930s.

The State Fair was held during the First World War, but was canceled in 1943 and 1944, during the Second World War.

U.S. Senator Harry S. Truman chose the Missouri State Fair as the place to formally launch his campaign for re-election to the Senate in 1940, shortly after the collapse of the Pendergast machine. In his speech at the Fair on July 15, 1940, Truman strongly endorsed the New Deal, including equality for African Americans. He chose the State Fair although Sedalia was deep in Ku Klux Klan country.

The fairgrounds was struck by an F2 tornado on August 21, 1952. There was considerable damage along its path, with one person killed and 13 others injured.

The fairgrounds hosted the Ozark Music Festival July 19–21, 1974. It rivaled the 1969 Woodstock festival in size, and was notorious for chaos and mismanagement: although no more than 50,000 tickets were sold, an estimated crowd of 350,000 people showed up. There were no more than five portable toilets on site, there were several hundred drug overdoses, and some attendees raided nearby cows and pigs for food. Hosted by Wolfman Jack, the festival includes 27 bands, including the Eagles, Aerosmith, Joe Walsh, the Nitty Gritty Dirt Band, the Marshall Tucker Band, REO Speedwagon, Lynyrd Skynyrd, and Ted Nugent. The fairgrounds were trashed a few weeks before the State Fair, causing approximately $100,000 in damages to the fairgrounds and raising concerns that the Fair might be canceled. After cleanup efforts, the 1974 State Fair was able to go forward as planned. The festival was later investigated by the Missouri Highway Patrol and a select committee of the Missouri State Senate (the "Select Senate Committee Investigating the Rock Festival"), which said that the festival was a "disaster" that "made the degradation of Sodom and Gomorrah appear mild."

In 2020, the State Fair was canceled due to the COVID-19 pandemic: the only event held was a youth livestock event. The State Fair returned in 2021.

== Attendance ==
Attendance was just under 338,000 in 2009, and just under 341,000 in 2018. About 350,000 attended in 2023.

== Fairgrounds ==
The Missouri State Fairgrounds Historic District was listed on the National Register of Historic Places in 1991. It encompasses 47 contributing buildings, 5 contributing sites, 7 contributing structures, and 7 contributing objects. The district developed between 1901 and 1941, and includes representative examples of Art Deco, Mission Revival, and Romanesque Revival architecture. They include several red brick exposition halls and animal barns, concrete drinking fountains constructed by Works Progress Administration, and concession buildings.

== Governance ==
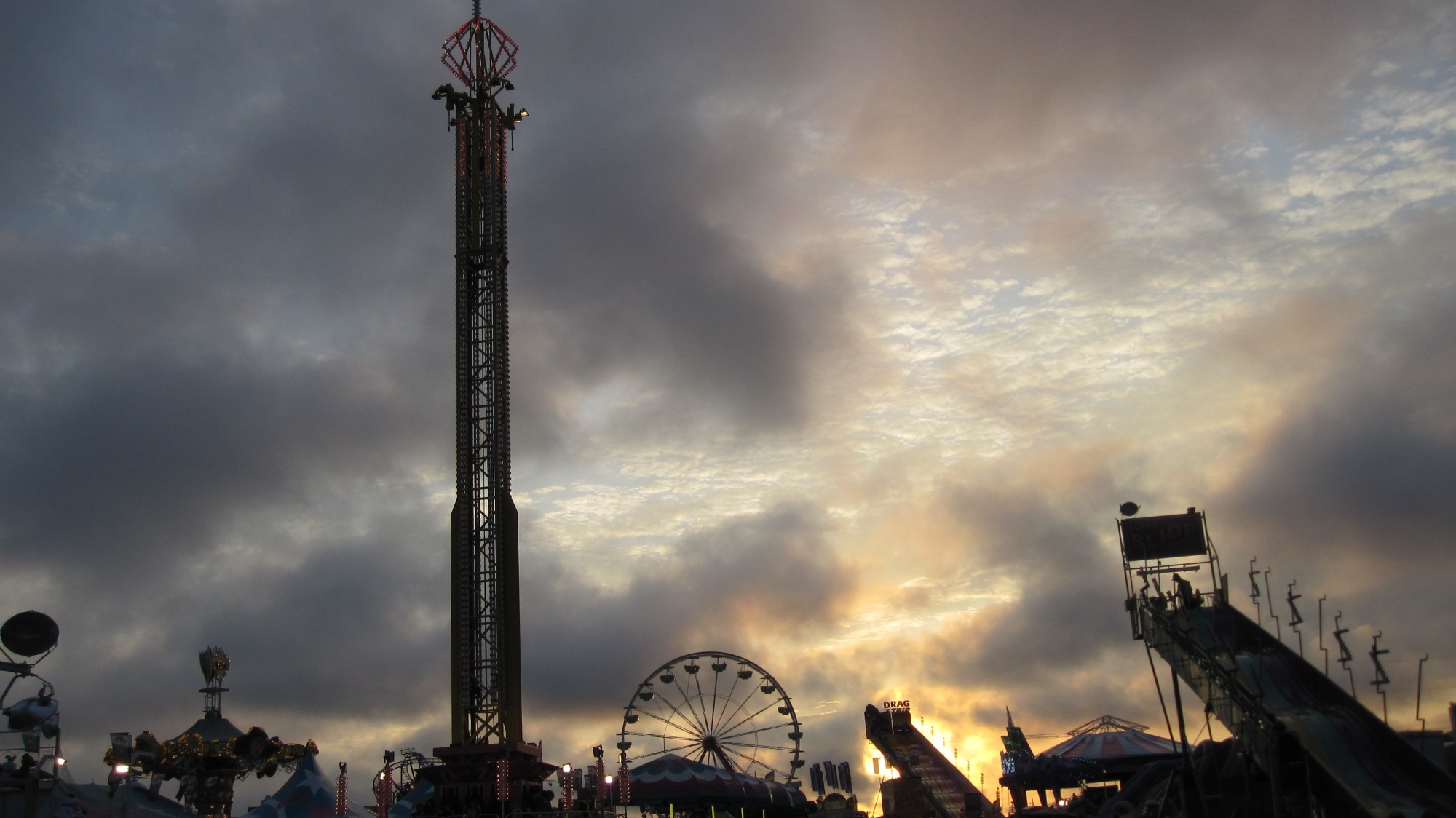
2011 Missouri State Fair Skyline

The fair is overseen by the Missouri State Fair Commission, which appoints a director of the State Fair.

The Commission consists of nine members: eight appointed commissioners plus the director of the Missouri Department of Agriculture, who serves ex officio. Of the nine members of the board, two members are required to be "active farmers"; two are required to serve (or have served) as president of a county fair or regional fair boards; and one member must be an agribusiness employee. Of the eight appointed commissioners, no more than four commissioners may belong to the same political party, and no more than two commissioners may reside in the same congressional district.

== See also ==
- Mathewson Exhibition Center
- Missouri State Fair Speedway
