= Kurt Schaefer =

American politician & lawyer (born 1965)

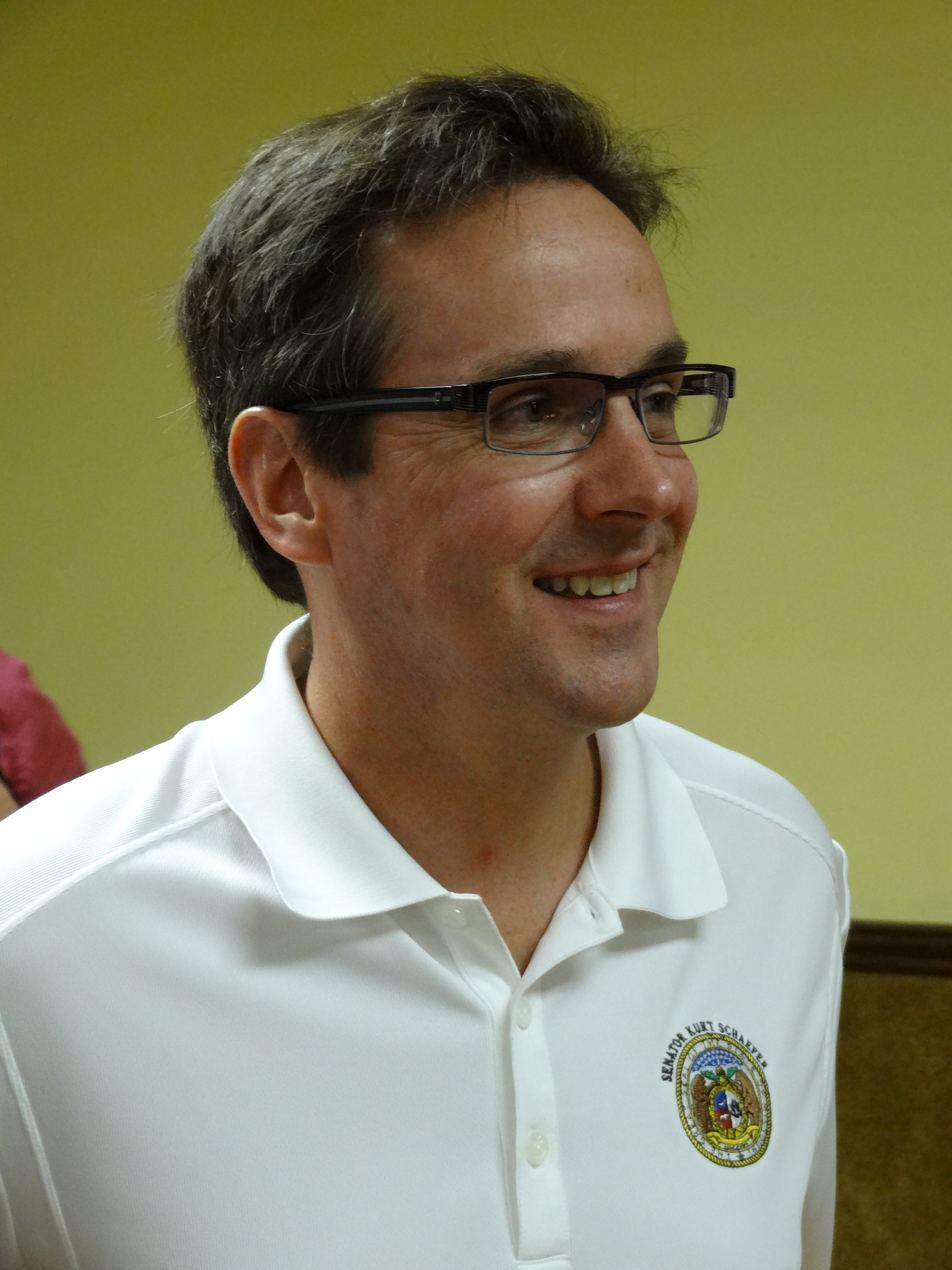

Member of the Missouri Senate from the 19th district
- In office January 2009 – January 2017
- Preceded by: Chuck Graham
- Succeeded by: Caleb Rowden

Personal details
- Born: October 27, 1965 (age 61) St. Louis, Missouri, U.S.
- Party: Republican
- Spouse: Stacia Schaefer
- Children: 3
- Education: University of Missouri (BA); Vermont Law School (JD)

Kurt Schaefer (born October 27, 1965) is a former Republican member of the Missouri Senate, representing the 19th District from 2009 to 2017. In 2016, Schaefer ran against Josh Hawley for Missouri Attorney General, but was defeated for the Republican nomination in the August 2 primary.

== Early life ==
Kurt Schaefer grew up in Town and Country, Missouri, where he was the youngest of five siblings. He moved to Columbia, Missouri in 1983. Schaefer began playing bass guitar at the age of 13, and he continued to play through his time in college. He was part of the band Third Uncle that played gigs in clubs around Columbia in the mid- to late-1980s. Schaefer also worked at Columbia music venue The Blue Note. Schaefer graduated from the University of Missouri in 1990 with a B.A. degree in geography, and he earned his J.D. from Vermont Law School in 1995.

== Legal career ==
Kurt Schaefer began his legal career as an assistant attorney general under then Missouri Attorney General Jay Nixon from 1995 to 1999.

Schaefer practiced law as a partner in the law firm of Lathrop & Gage LLP since 2007, focusing on litigation, environmental, health care, administrative, business and public utilities law.

Under Republican Governor Matt Blunt, Schaefer served as general counsel and deputy director of the Missouri Department of Natural Resources, special counsel to the Governor, special counsel to the Missouri Department of Agriculture, Missouri assistant attorney general and special assistant United States attorney general.

Among other career highlights, Schaefer oversaw the emergency response and cleanup of the destruction caused by AmerenUE's Taum Sauk Reservoir failure in December, 2005, negotiating a settlement for the state's natural resource damages of Johnsons Shut-Ins State Park valued at $179 million.

== Political career ==
In 2002, Schaefer sought a nomination as a Democrat by the 13th Circuit Democratic Committee for a judicial position. Subsequently, he ran for office as a Republican.

Kurt Schaefer was elected to represent the 19th Senate District of Missouri in 2008 in a hotly contested election where he defeated incumbent Democratic Senator Chuck Graham. In the Senate, Schaefer serves as the Chairman of the Senate Appropriations Committee and serves on the Senate Committees on Judiciary and Civil and Criminal Jurisprudence and Commerce, Consumer Protection, Energy and the Environment.

In 2016 Kurt Schafer ran for the Republican nomination for Attorney General of Missouri but was defeated by Josh Hawley, he finished second with 36% of the popular vote.

In January 2025, Governor Mike Kehoe appointed Schafer to serve as the Director of the Department of Natural Resources.

In September 2026, Schaefer took the role of Missouri Office of Administration Commissioner.

== Legislative history ==
Schaefer has been accused of using his position on the Appropriations Committee of the State Legislature to strong-arm political opponents. The former President of the University of Missouri published a letter claiming that Schaefer pressured him not to permit opponent, Josh Hawley, a leave of absence to run. The letter claimed Schaefer also pressured him to deny Hawley tenure. A Sunshine Law request was made to the University of Missouri by Washington, DC special interests supporting Hawley to determine if Schaefer threatened to lower the university's funding if they encouraged Josh Hawley, a law professor at the University of Missouri, to run against him. Multiple Sunshine Law requests made to the University of Missouri attempting to collect Hawley's emails regarding using taxpayer resources and time to prepare a run for office were met with threats of lawsuits by the Hawley campaign.

Schaefer proposed a budget for 2016 that singled out social services for major cuts putting in place cost saving reforms to in-state welfare and some public assistance programs. These cuts were proposed during a strong fiscal period with optimistic forecasts supporting a balanced budget.

In the legislature, Schaefer sponsored a measure dubbed Amendment Five that was approved by voters by an overwhelming margin in August 2014. The amendment enshrines in the Missouri Constitution an individual's right to bear arms and protects against potential actions taken by the state legislature to infringe upon that right. A Missouri judge has ruled that the amendment permits felons to own guns. While running for Attorney General in 2015, he chaired the "Sanctity of Life Committee" in the Missouri senate. This committee was formed in reaction to the Planned Parenthood 2015 undercover videos controversy, though the Missouri Attorney General found no evidence of illegality in Planned Parenthood's actions. In August 2015 the committee requested testimony from the MU Chancellor R. Bowen Loftin regarding the associations between the University of Missouri and Planned Parenthood. After this testimony Loftin withdrew the university from 10 agreements with Planned Parenthood where medical students could complete clinical hours and terminated, and terminated the "refer and follow" privileges of a Planned Parenthood doctor in Columbia, which made the local clinic unable to legally perform abortions in Missouri.

Schaefer also proposed a bill (SB 248) that permits religious student organizations on college campuses to receive public funds though they refuse to abide by the non-discrimination clause regarding sexual orientation.

== Family ==
Schaefer and his wife have three children and live in Columbia, Missouri.
