= Kathy Steinhoff =

American politician

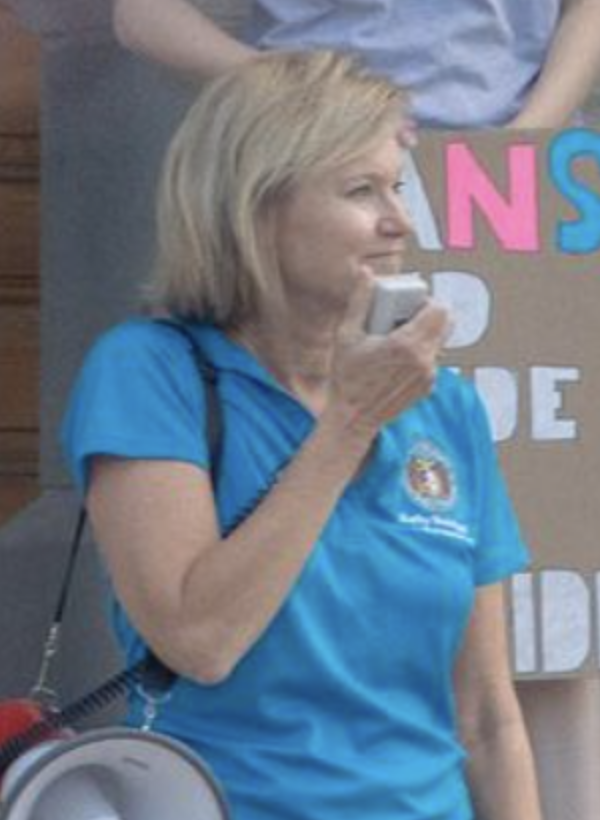
- Steinhoff in 2023

Member of the Missouri House of Representatives from the 45th district
- Incumbent
- Assumed office January 4, 2023
- Preceded by: David Tyson Smith

Personal details
- Born: St. Louis, Missouri, U.S.
- Party: Democratic
- Spouse: Doug Steinhoff
- Children: 1
- Education: University of Missouri

Kathy Steinhoff is an American politician serving as a member of the Missouri House of Representatives for the 45th district. Elected in November 2022, she assumed office on January 2, 2023. A member of the Democratic Party, she worked as a teacher before entering politics.

== Personal life ==
Steinhoff was born in St. Louis, Missouri. She earned a bachelor's degree in math education in 1987 and a master's degree in curriculum and instruction in 1992, both from the University of Missouri. Steinhoff later earned the University of Missouri College of Education & Human Development Lifetime Achievement Award at the 55th Annual Awards Banquet in 2023.

Steinhoff resides in Columbia, Missouri, with her husband Doug. She has one child and two stepchildren.

== Teaching career ==
Steinhoff worked as a math teacher at Columbia Public Schools for 34 years and served as the Hickman High School Mathematics Department Chair before retiring in May 2022. She was certified by the National Board for Professional Teaching Standards. Steinhoff was heavily involved in the Columbia chapter of the National Education Association (NEA) and served in many capacities, most notably as its president from 2015 to 2021. She was awarded the NEA Member Benefits Award for Teaching Excellence in 2011. Steinhoff also volunteered as a member of Moms Demand Action, working on numerous political campaigns.

== Political career ==
On February 8, 2022, Steinhoff announced her candidacy in the 2022 election to represent the 45th district in the Missouri House of Representatives, pledging to protect public education and combat gun violence. She said she was encouraged by people to enter the race after no one had filed to run in her district, which, together with her forthcoming retirement from teaching, created a "perfect storm of timing." Steinhoff was elected to the seat in November after running unopposed in both the Democratic primary and the general election.

Soon after her election, Steinhoff appeared at a press conference alongside Daniel Boone Regional Library Workers United union leaders to denounce a rule proposal by Missouri Secretary of State Jay Ashcroft which aimed to limit access to library materials by minors. "It is not the role of the library to limit access to materials," Steinhoff said. "Parents should make these decisions about the materials that come into their home."

Steinhoff was sworn in on January 4, 2023. She sponsored three pieces of legislation in February 2023, all pertaining to education. Steinhoff participated in a student-led walkout at Hickman High School to protest gun violence in May before speaking at a rally for gender-affirming care in September, the latter in response to a state law banning gender-affirming care for minors.

On October 2, 2023, Steinhoff announced her intention to run for reelection.

=== Committees ===
- Budget Committee
  - Subcommittee on Appropriations - Education
- Pensions Committee

== Electoral history ==
=== 2022 ===
2022 Missouri's 45th House district election
Primary election
Party	Candidate	Votes	%
Democratic	Kathy Steinhoff	2,291	100.0
Total votes		2,291	100.0
General election
Democratic	Kathy Steinhoff	6,373	99.2
Write-in		49	0.8
Total votes		6,422	100.0
Democratic hold			
