= Mo. Gov. =

Mo. Gov. may refer to:

- Government of Missouri
- Governor of Missouri
