= LSV-2 =

LSV-2 may refer to the following vessels of the United States Armed Forces:

- USS Ozark (LSV-2), 1942–1974
- USAV CW3 Harold C. Clinger (LSV-2)
