= Chuck Graham =

American politician (1965–2020)

Member of the Missouri Senate from the 19th district
- In office January 2005 – January 2009
- Preceded by: Ken Jacob
- Succeeded by: Kurt Schaefer

Member of the Missouri House of Representatives from the 24th district
- In office January 1997 – January 2005
- Preceded by: Jim Pauley
- Succeeded by: Ed Robb

Personal details
- Born: February 24, 1965 St. Louis, Missouri, United States
- Died: May 19, 2020 (aged 55)
- Party: Democratic
- Education: University of Illinois Urbana–Champaign (BS)

Charles Graham (February 24, 1965 – May 19, 2020) was an American politician in the Democratic Party who represented the 19th Senate District in the Missouri General Assembly, which includes the city of Columbia, Missouri, where he lived.

== Biography ==
Graham was born in St. Louis, Missouri. He graduated from the University of Illinois Urbana-Champaign in 1987 with a B.S. in journalism.

He was first elected to the Missouri House of Representatives in 1996, and served there through 2005. He was first elected to the Missouri State Senate in 2004, and served as the party's Assistant Minority Floor Leader. He had been mentioned as a possible candidate in the 2006 United States Senate election, but dropped out in support of then-State Auditor Claire McCaskill.

He served on the following committees:

- Education
- Gubernatorial Appointments
- Judiciary and Civil and Criminal Jurisprudence
- Pensions, Veterans' Affairs and General Laws

In 1998, Graham proposed a bill which would have permitted death row prisoners awaiting execution to donate organs (kidneys or bone marrow) in exchange for a commutation of their death sentence. He was a strong supporter of stem-cell research.

On October 20, 2007, Graham was arrested by the Columbia Police Department on suspicion of driving while intoxicated after rear-ending a vehicle near his home in Southwest Columbia. His license was subsequently suspended.

Graham was a paraplegic after he had an automobile accident at age 16. He received national attention during a 2008 televised campaign rally in Columbia. Then vice-presidential nominee Joe Biden asked him to stand up and was apparently unaware of his paralysis. When Biden realized that Graham could not stand up, he asked for the crowd to stand up for him.

On November 4, 2008, Graham lost his seat after being defeated in the general election by Republican Kurt Schaefer. After the 2008 election, he announced that he had no future plans to run for public office.

Graham died on May 19, 2020, at the age of 55.
