= USS Catskill (LSV-1) =

1942 Catskill-class vehicle landing ship

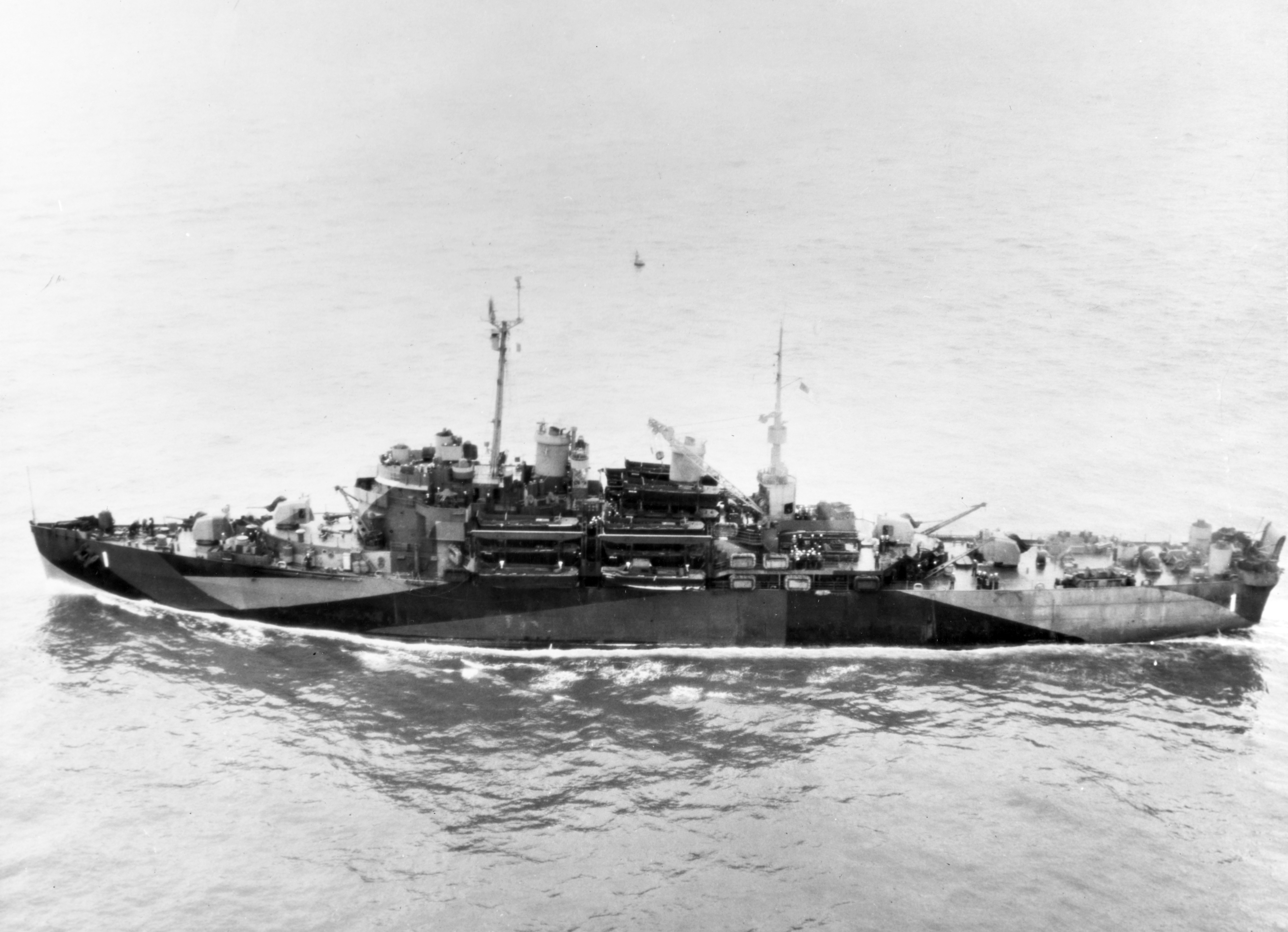
- USS Catskill on 30 March 1945

History

United States
- Name: USS Catskill
- Namesake: Catskill Mountains in New York
- Builder: Willamette Iron and Steel Works, Portland, Oregon
- Laid down: 12 July 1941, as CM-6 (minelayer)
- Launched: 19 May 1942
- Decommissioned: 30 August 1946
- Reclassified: AP-106 (transport), 1 May 1943; LSV-1 (Landing Ship Vehicle), 21 April 1944; MCS-1 (Mine Countermeasures Support Ship), 18 October 1956
- Stricken: 1 July 1961
- Reinstated: 1 June 1964
- Recommissioned: 6 October 1967
- Decommissioned: December 1970
- Honours and awards: 3 battle stars (World War II); 5 campaign stars (Vietnam)

General characteristics
- Type: Landing ship
- Displacement: 5,875 long tons (5,969 t) light; 9,040 long tons (9,185 t) full
- Length: 455 ft 5 in (138.81 m)
- Beam: 60 ft 2 in (18.34 m)
- Draft: 20 ft (6.1 m)
- Propulsion: 2 × Combustion Engineering 2-drum boilers; 2 × General Electric geared turbines; 2 shafts
- Speed: 23 knots (43 km/h; 26 mph)
- Boats & landing craft carried: 31 × DUKWs, plus LCVPs (LSV configuration); 20 × 36 ft (11 m)-MSLs (MCS configuration)
- Troops: 868 officers and enlisted (LSV configuration)
- Complement: 400+ officers and enlisted men
- Armament: 4 × single 5"/38 caliber gun mounts; 4 × twin 40 mm guns; 20 × single 20 mm guns
- Aircraft carried: 2 helicopters (MCS configuration)

USS Catskill (LSV-1) was a vehicle landing ship built for the United States Navy during World War II. The lead ship of her class, she was named for the Catskill Mountains in southeastern New York State.

== Service history ==
Originally designed as a cruiser-minelayer (CM-6); she laid down on 12 July 1941 under a contract issued by the US Navy. She was launched on 19 May 1942 by Willamette Iron and Steel Corporation of Portland, Oregon; sponsored by Mrs. J. G. McPherson. While under construction, she was reclassified to a troop transport AP-106 on 1 May 1943, and then to a vehicle landing ship LSV-1 on 21 April 1944, because she was readily adaptable to the role of an urgently needed carrier of amphibious vehicles. It appears from available sources that the ship was never actually delivered to the Navy before it was commissioned on 30 June 1944 as a landing ship although that would indicate more than two years passed from her launching to completion even in the midst of WWII.

Further, the Dictionary of American Naval Fighting Ships says the vessel was originally ordered as a troopship although her sister USS Ozark was ordered as a minelayer and Catskill's design is more as a minelayer than as a troop carrier leading to some doubt on the accuracy of the DANFS record.

=== 1944 ===
Catskill sailed from San Diego on 12 August 1944 for Hawaii, where she embarked marines, and proceeded by way of Eniwetok for Manus, where she joined the transport group of the Southern Attack Force for the assault on Leyte. This group sailed on 14 October for the return to the Philippines, and entered Leyte Gulf without event, anchoring off Dulag on 20 October to launch the initial attack. The landing was successful, and Catskill completed her offloading and was able to retire in the afternoon of 22 October, before the start of the battle for Leyte Gulf. Catskill returned to New Guinea and then sailed to Morotai, where from 5 to 10 November 1944 she loaded troops and cargo under almost continuous enemy air raids. As her convoy proceeded north with these reinforcements for Leyte, it came under enemy air attack on 13 November, and Catskill's gunners contributed to shooting down Japanese aircraft. Unloading in Leyte Gulf took place on 14 November, and Catskill got underway at once for Manus, and New Guinea, where she took part in special training.

=== 1945 ===
Returning to Manus 21 December 1944, Catskill sailed 10 days later with the Lingayen Attack Force, which came under air attack, although not in Catskill's sector, as it made its final approach. On 9 January 1945 the landings were successfully made on beaches that the Japanese had considered too difficult for an amphibious assault. The force was under repeated air attack, but Catskill accomplished her part of the landing, and cleared Lingayen for Leyte 10 January. Anchoring two days later, she loaded Army troops and cargo for the first reinforcement of Lingayen 27 January. Arriving in the Solomon Islands 11 February 1945 Catskill began intensive training for the Okinawa operation. On 21 March, she anchored in Ulithi, staging area for the massive assault, and on 27 March got underway for the initial assault on 1 April, in which she landed units of the 6th Marines. That night, she moved out to sea, and for the next four days, returned to the beachhead area daily to complete her unloading of men and cargo. Returning to Saipan 9 April, Catskill continued on to San Francisco, arriving 13 May. Between 16 May and 14 June 1945 Catskill made a voyage from San Francisco to Pearl Harbor carrying vehicles and general cargo, and steamed to Pearl Harbor once again. She loaded troops there for Eniwetok, Saipan, and Guam, and after carrying out this assignment, proceeded to Manila, arriving 5 July. Here she remained until 20 September, when she sailed laden with Army troops for the occupation of Japan. Catskill anchored in Wakayama Bay on 25 September, and cleared Japan 1 October for the Philippines, where she embarked homeward-bound servicemen. She arrived in San Francisco 27 October, and sailed again 10 November on the first of two more voyages to bring troops home from Guam, Ulithi, Peleliu, and Eniwetok. On 21 December 1945 Catskill sailed from San Diego for Guam with the 90th Marine Corps Replacement Draft which was eventually headed for China. She arrived in Guam on 18 January 1946.

=== Decommissioning and conversion, 1946–1967 ===
On 10 February 1946 Catskill arrived at San Diego, where she was placed out of commission in reserve 30 August 1946. Laid up in the Pacific Reserve Fleet, San Diego Group, Catskill was reclassified under SCB 123 as mine countermeasures support ship MCS-1 on 18 October 1956. Struck from the Naval Vessel Register 1 July 1961, she was reinstated 1 June 1964.

Converted to an MCS in fiscal year 1964 at Boland Machine Manufacturing Company of New Orleans, Louisiana from 25 June 1964 to 8 September 1967, Catskill (MCS-1) was recommissioned 6 October 1967.

=== Vietnam, 1967–1970 ===
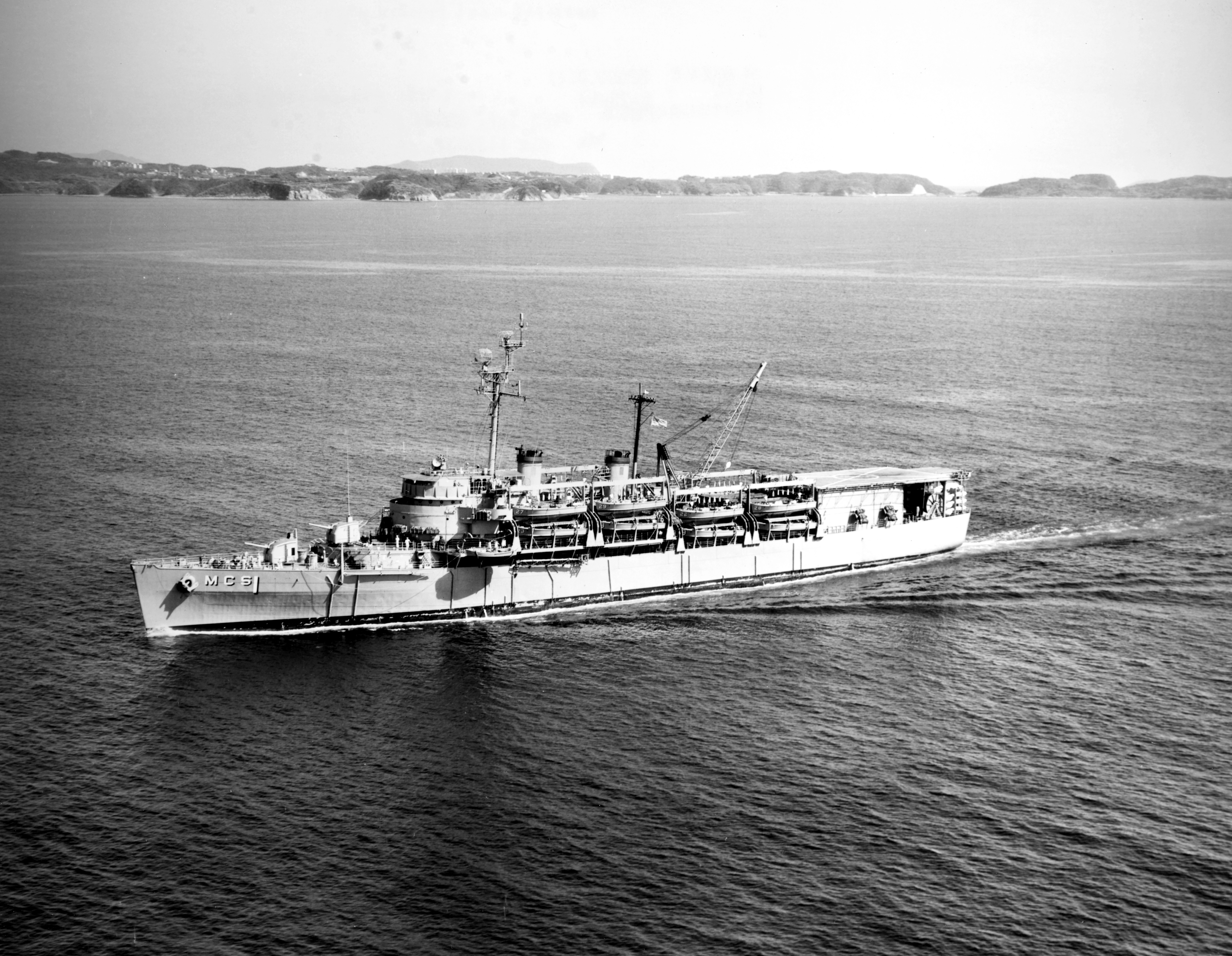
Catskill off Vietnam, in 1969.

During the Vietnam War Catskill participated in the following campaigns:

- Tet 69/Counteroffensive (5 to 11 May 1969)
- Vietnam Summer-Fall 1969 (9 to 18 June 1969)
- Vietnam Winter-Spring 1970 (14 March to 12 April 1970)
- Sanctuary Counteroffensive (28 to 30 June 1970)
- Vietnamese Counteroffensive – Phase VII (1 July 1970)

Decommissioned in December, 1970 at the Naval Shipyard in Long Beach, California, Catskill was struck from the Naval Register and believed to have been scrapped.

== Awards ==
- Asiatic–Pacific Campaign Medal with three battle stars
- World War II Victory Medal
- Navy Occupation Medal with "ASIA" clasp
- National Defense Service Medal
- Vietnam Service Medal with five campaign stars
- Philippine Presidential Unit Citation
- Philippine Liberation Medal with two service stars
- Republic of Vietnam Campaign Medal
