= Martha Stevens =

American politician

Member of the Missouri House of Representatives from the 46th district
- In office 2017–2023
- Preceded by: Stephen Webber
- Succeeded by: David Tyson Smith (redistricting)

Personal details
- Party: Democratic

Martha Stevens is an American politician. She is a former member of the Missouri House of Representatives from the 46th District, serving from 2017 to 2023.

Stevens has a bachelor's degree in sociology and a Master's in social work from the University of Missouri.
