= Ozark Music Festival =

1974 rock music festival in Missouri

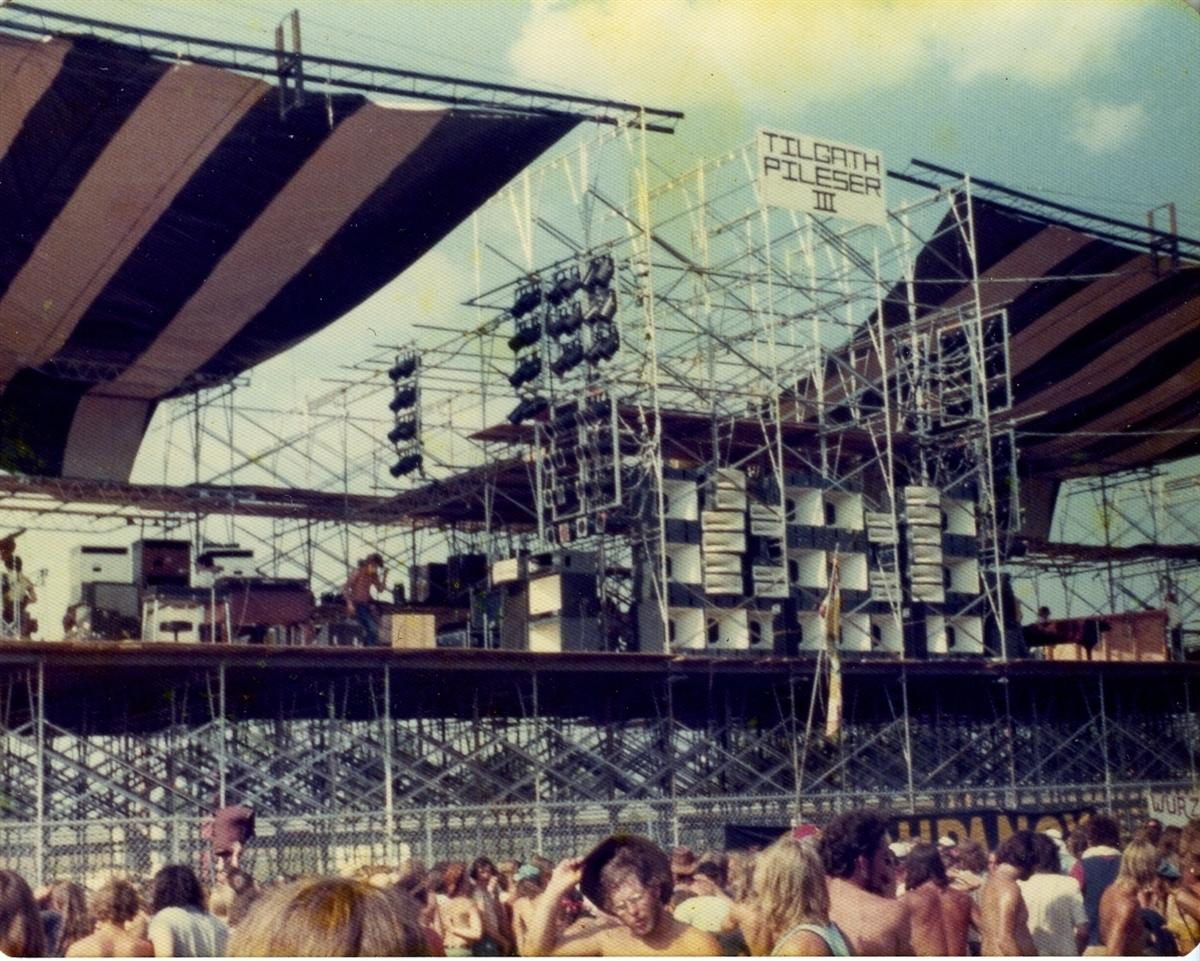
- Genre: Rock music; pop
- Dates: July 19–21, 1974
- Locations: Missouri State Fairgrounds in Sedalia, Missouri, U.S.
- Founders: Musical Productions Inc. (MPI)
- Attendance: 160,000 (estimated)

The Ozark Music Festival was held on July 19–21, 1974 on the Missouri State Fairgrounds in Sedalia, Missouri. It is estimated that anywhere from 160,000 to 350,000 were in attendance at the three day festival. The event was marked by mismanagement as the facilities were not equipped for the number of attendees.

== Promotion ==
The Ozark Music Festival was organized by Musical Productions, Inc., a company created by a group of Kansas City businessmen for the purpose of promoting the festival. Chris Fritz served as president, and Robert Shaw handled the advertising and general production for the event. On February 21, 1974, prior to its March incorporation, the company's legal counsel sent a letter to Ron Jones, Secretary of the Missouri State Fair, officially proposing the music festival and suggesting that it be held on the fairgrounds. A lease was signed on April 11 after negotiations between officials with the Missouri Department of Agriculture (the state agency which oversaw the State Fair) and Musical Productions, Inc. The company agreed to pay the State of Missouri $40,000 for use of the fairgrounds.

Promoters assured officials from the Missouri Department of Agriculture and the Sedalia Chamber of Commerce that the three-day weekend event would be a bluegrass and “pop rock” festival with no more than 50,000 tickets sold. Advertisements described additional attractions, such as a craft fair and an electronics display. $100,000 worth of jewelry would reportedly be displayed in booths at the festival. Promoters of the event refused to call it a rock festival in attempt to lessen the worries of local citizens, many of whom were afraid the Ozark Music Festival would be similar to events such as Woodstock or Altamont. Promoters also planned a nondenominational religious service for Sunday morning on the last day of the event, along with an "old-time fiddler show." Wells Fargo Security Service would provide 375 security guards.

== Festival ==
Although the Ozark Music Festival was not slated to begin until Friday, July 19, crowds began to form as early as Monday of that week. That same evening, a combined force of officers from the Missouri State Highway Patrol, the Sedalia Police Department, and the Pettis County Sheriff's Office conducted a series of drug raids at the fairgrounds. As they made their arrests, it is reported that a crowd of 250 to 400 people formed and began shouting insults at the officers and throwing rocks, chunks of asphalt, and other objects. Four patrol cars were damaged by the thrown objects, resulting in $650 worth of damage. 17 individuals were arrested during the raid, but the Wells Fargo security team secured the release of 14 the next morning. In the days leading up to the start of the festival, several local businesses reported shoplifting from their stores and disruptions by concert goers.

By Thursday, July 18, it was reported that traffic was jammed for several miles on highways coming in to Sedalia. The congestion was believed to have resulted from only one of the fairgrounds' gates having been opened. Traffic was at a standstill for hours, resulting in people camping in their cars that night. The problem was not remedied until Friday afternoon when promoters decided to open additional gates. The promoters of the festival had underestimated the attendance for the event and were grossly unprepared in regard to staffing. Many of the Wells Fargo security team were reassigned to other responsibilities such as ticket sales.

Advance tickets sold for $15, while tickets cost $20 at the gate. The Ozark Music Festival was hosted by the popular radio personality, Wolfman Jack. Among its top billed performers were Bachman Turner Overdrive, America, the Eagles, the Earl Scruggs Revue, and Lynyrd Skynyrd. The Ozark Mountain Daredevils, Bruce Springsteen, and Jefferson Starship were in the initial lineup but canceled shortly prior to the event. The Ozark Music Festival occurred during the Richard Nixon impeachment proceedings, and the Eagles dedicated their performance of “Already Gone” to the president. When the gates officially opened on Friday, July 19, it was reported that 60,000 individuals were in attendance.The crowd peaked to well over 100,000 on the afternoon of Saturday, July 20. By the time America played the last song of the festival the evening of the next day, the crowd numbered around 15,000.

Nudity, drug use, and open drug sales were witnessed on the fairgrounds during the festival. Substance abuse, lack of sleep, and temperatures in excess of 100 degrees Fahrenheit combined to make medical emergencies a common occurrence. Medical staff working at the festival were totally unprepared for the volume of patients that they received. Later reports estimated that at least 2,500 people were treated on-site at the festival. Over 230 individuals had to be transported to area hospitals. The majority of patients in both scenarios were treated for drug related issues. One festival attendee died at Bothwell Memorial Hospital from complications relating to a drug overdose.

== Performers ==
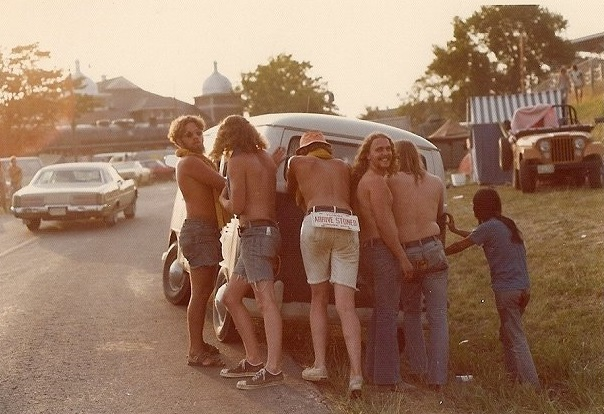
Concert-goers at the Ozark Music Festival help push a stalled VW microbus

The bands that performed included:

- Aerosmith
- Peter Sinfield
- Eagles
- America
- Marshall Tucker Band
- The Nitty Gritty Dirt Band
- Ted Nugent and the Amboy Dukes
- David Bromberg
- Leo Kottke
- Lynyrd Skynyrd
- The Electric Flag
- The Earl Scruggs Revue
- Charlie Daniels Band
- Joe Walsh and Barnstorm
- The Souther-Hillman-Furay Band
- Jimmie Spheeris
- Triphammer
- Bill Quateman
- Fresh Start
- Babe Ruth
- Locomotiv GT
- REO Speedwagon
- Bob Seger
- Elvin Bishop

Host/Emcee: Wolfman Jack

The bands and artists that were in the initial lineup but canceled their performance include:

- Boz Scaggs
- Bruce Springsteen
- The Ozark Mountain Daredevils
- Mahavishnu Orchestra
- Jefferson Starship

== Aftermath ==
By Monday, July 22, the festival crowd had left, leaving a field of garbage behind. Musical Productions, Inc., left cleanup responsibilities to the state of Missouri, a massive task that, when combined with repairs, resulted in $35,916 worth of expenses. The cleanup had to be completed before the gates opened for the Missouri State Fair in August. In one example of damage that occurred to the fairgrounds, the portable toilets were turned over and emptied after they were quickly filled up. Conditions were bad enough on the fairgrounds that lime had to be spread as a disinfectant in order to make the fairgrounds safe for visitors.

On the ground, bulldozers scraped up the topsoil, which was (reportedly) littered with discarded drug paraphernalia and gnawed cobs of corn from a neighboring field along with mountains of contaminated dirt and garbage which were hauled to the county landfills.

Meanwhile, festival-goers crowded the Interstate 70 rest stops to catch up on sleep lost during the weekend. Tents, cots and sleeping bags were spread throughout rest stops all along the highway.

In early September of that year, the city council banned future rock concerts in the city.

== Select Senate Committee Report ==
On Monday, July 22, a day after the close of the Festival, six Missouri State Senators toured the fairgrounds and announced that they were planning on launching a Senate subcommittee investigation into the Ozark Music Festival. Missouri Senator Richard Webster acted as chairman of the subcommittee. The expressed goals of the investigation were to determine what went wrong, why it was able to happen, and the festival's total cost to the State of Missouri. They committee members were also charged with proposing "legislation which would prevent such an occurrence from happening again and which would provide for better control of the drug abuse statutes of our State." The subcommittee heard testimonies from the Musical Productions, Inc., promoters; the director and deputy director (Secretary of the State Fair at the time of the lease's signing) of the Missouri Department of Agriculture; festival staff; and other witnesses to events surrounding the Ozark Music Festival.

The Select Senate Committee's report was issued on October 25, 1974, outlining occurrences that seemed to confirm the worst fears of those who argued against the Ozark Music Festival being held on state grounds. Open and uninhibited drug sales were described as a common sight on the fairgrounds. The report equated these sales to concession stands at a sporting event, with one witness even claiming that there was a man at the festival walking around with a cartridge belt full of heroin syringes which he advertised and sold to concert goers. Sedalia residents described seeing nude women around the fairgrounds with signs advertising various drugs. A farmer with land bordering the fairgrounds reported that concert attendees killed some of his livestock and caused extensive property damage. Witnesses also testified that two school busses were turned into brothels and that sexual activities were common across the festival grounds and served as a spectator sport.

The Select Senate Committee Report concluded that "The scene on the grounds at Sedalia made the degradation of Sodom and Gomorrah appear to be rather mild." It recommended that a Division of Drug and Crime Control be established within the state of Missouri and that legislation be enacted which could regulate, and possibly prevent, future music festivals from occurring.

== See also ==
- List of historic rock festivals
- List of jam band music festivals

== Other sources ==
- Report of the Select Senate Committee investigating the Rock Festival, October 25, 1974 at Internet Archive.
- Senate Select Committee on the Rock Festival (held at Sedalia State Fairgrounds, July 18-22, 1974). Transcript of proceedings.
