= Stephen Webber =

American politician

Member of the Missouri Senate from the 19th district
- Incumbent
- Assumed office January 8, 2025
- Preceded by: Caleb Rowden

Chair of the Missouri Democratic Party
- In office December 4, 2016 – December 1, 2018
- Preceded by: Roy Temple
- Succeeded by: Jean Peters Baker

Member of the Missouri House of Representatives from the 46th district
- In office January 7, 2009 – January 9, 2017
- Preceded by: Jeff Harris
- Succeeded by: Martha Stevens

Personal details
- Born: June 8, 1983 (age 43)
- Party: Democratic
- Education: Saint Louis University (BA); University of Missouri, Columbia (JD)

Military service
- Allegiance: United States
- Branch/service: United States Marine Corps
- Years of service: 2004; 2006–2007
- Rank: Sergeant
- Battles/wars: Iraq War

Stephen Webber (born June 8, 1983) is an American politician. He is a member of the Missouri Senate from the 19th district, serving since 2025. He previously represented the 46th district in the Missouri House of Representatives from 2009 to 2017. He is a member of the Democratic Party.

== Background and education ==
Webber attended The American Legion Boys State of Missouri in 2000. He is a 2001 graduate of Hickman High School in Columbia, MO. He received his bachelor's degree in economics from Saint Louis University in 2006. Webber received his J.D. in 2013 from the University of Missouri School of Law and is a licensed attorney in the State of Missouri.

== Career ==
Webber has served two tours of duty in Iraq with the United States Marine Corps. His first tour, which began in 2004 and lasted 7 months, found him stationed outside Abu Ghraib prison. In 2006, he returned to Iraq, this time to Fallujah, as a squad leader of 12 other Marines.

After returning from Iraq, he worked as an aide to Senator Claire McCaskill (D-Mo.) in Washington, D.C.

Webber completed his Juris Doctor in 2013 at the University of Missouri-Columbia School of Law and is licensed to practice law in the State of Missouri.

== Political career ==
=== Election to State House ===
==== Democratic primary ====
On February 19, 2008, Webber announced his candidacy for the Democratic nomination to replace Representative Jeff Harris as the member for the 23rd District in the Missouri House of Representatives. Harris, a Democrat, had previously announced he would not run for reelection in order to run for attorney general of Missouri.

Webber defeated opponent Cande Iveson in the August 5, 2008 Democratic primary election, with 3,391 votes to her 1,735, or 66.2 percent to 33.8 percent of the vote.

During the primary campaign, the Columbia Daily Tribune reported that Webber had received a number of "high-powered endorsements" from "education groups, labor unions and a bevy of Columbia political figures" including former Missouri governor Roger B. Wilson and local Democratic booster Bruce Wilson.

==== General election ====
Webber ran unopposed in the November 4th, 2008 general election, winning 100% of the vote and making him the youngest representative in the state.

=== In office ===
Upon election, Webber and fellow incoming representatives Mary Still and Chris Kelly announced a number of legislative initiatives, vowing to increase funding for the University of Missouri, add "robo-calls" to Missouri's No Call List, increase state restrictions on short-term or "payday" loans, and change Missouri election law to allow early voting.

During his first term as representative, Webber sat on the Rules Committee, a Special Standing Committee on Workforce Development and Workplace Safety, and the Homeland Security Committee.

=== State Senate elections ===
In April 2015 State Rep. Stephen Webber announced his intention to seek the 19th District State Senate seat. In his announcement Webber described the importance of the Mid-Missouri community, "When I was sitting in Fallujah, the place I wanted to come back to was Boone County, it wasn't anywhere else in the world," Webber said. "The community has invested a lot in me and I want to make sure we invest in the next generation of Missourians." The incumbent State Senator, Kurt Schaefer, was term limited. Webber was unopposed in the August 2016 Democratic primary election, and in November he faced Republican state Representative Caleb Rowden. District 19 was made up of two counties: Boone and Cooper, with 91% of the votes cast in Boone and only 9% cast in Cooper. Webber narrowly won Boone by a margin of 1,063 votes, but Rowden won Cooper by a landslide of 3,219 votes, giving Rowden the win district-wide.

In February 2024, Webber filed to run for District 19 again, which is currently made up of only Boone County, and is unopposed again in the Democratic primary.

== Electoral history ==
=== State Representative ===
2008 General Election for Missouri’s 23rd District House of Representatives
| Party | Candidate | Votes | % | ±% |
|---|---|---|---|---|
| Democratic | Stephen Webber | 16,862 | 100.00 | |
| Republican | none | 0 | 0.00 | |

2010 General Election for Missouri’s 23rd District House of Representatives
| Party | Candidate | Votes | % | ±% |
|---|---|---|---|---|
| Democratic | Stephen Webber | 9,370 | 67.99 | |
| Republican | Paul S. Szopa | 4,411 | 32.01 | |

2012 General Election for Missouri’s 46th District House of Representatives
| Party | Candidate | Votes | % | ±% |
|---|---|---|---|---|
| Democratic | Stephen Webber | 12,202 | 65.02 | |
| Republican | Fred Berry | 6,564 | 34.98 | |

2014 General Election for Missouri’s 46th District House of Representatives
| Party | Candidate | Votes | % | ±% |
|---|---|---|---|---|
| Democratic | Stephen Webber | 7,948 | 100.00 | |
| Republican | NONE | 0 | 0 | |

=== State Senate ===
2016 General Election for Missouri's 19th Senate District
| Party | Candidate | Votes | % | ±% |
|---|---|---|---|---|
| Republican | Caleb Rowden | 45,335 | 51.22% | |
| Democratic | Stephen Webber | 43,179 | 48.78% | |
| Total votes | | 88,514 | 100.00% | |

2024 General Election for Missouri's 19th Senate District
| Party | Candidate | Votes | % | ±% |
|---|---|---|---|---|
| Democratic | Stephen Webber | 48,998 | 57.0% | |
| Republican | James Coyne | 37,010 | 43.0% | |
| Total votes | | 86,008 | 100.00% | |

Party political offices
| Preceded by Roy Temple | Chair of the Missouri Democratic Party; 2016–2018 | Succeeded by Jean Peters Baker |
