= Jeff Harris (politician) =

American politician

Jeff Harris is an attorney and a Missouri Democratic politician. He represented the 23rd District of Missouri in the Missouri House of Representatives from 2003–2009 and ran unsuccessfully for the office of attorney general in 2008. He served as Minority Floor Leader before giving up the post in order to focus more time on the attorney general race.

Harris was born in Columbia and graduated magna cum laude with a B.A. from Vanderbilt University in 1987, and from Cornell University with a J.D. in 1991. He was on the board of editors of the Cornell Law Review while at that school. Following law school, Harris practiced in the litigation department of Bryan Cave, LLP, in Kansas City, Missouri for nine years. In 2001, he took an Assistant Attorney General position with the Missouri Attorney General's office.

He was first elected to the Missouri House of Representatives in 2002, and won reelection in 2004 and 2006.

The Columbia Tribune observed that Harris's leadership in the House "allowed him to be one of the chief spokesmen against the Republican majority."

In 2008 he ran unsuccessfully for the Democratic nomination for Missouri Attorney General against fellow state Representative Margaret Donnelly, and State Senator Chris Koster. Jay Nixon, then the current Attorney General, ran for Governor and was elected. Democrat Stephen Webber succeeded Harris in the Missouri House.

Harris also served as the Policy Director for former Missouri Governor Jay Nixon.

He is currently a circuit court judge for the 13th judicial circuit of Missouri.

== Personal life ==
Jeff Harris and his family reside in Columbia, Missouri. He is a member of the Missouri United Methodist Church. And was a member of the Elks Club, the Columbia Chamber of Commerce, the Prevent Child Abuse Missouri Board, the Missouri Kidney Program Advisory Board, the Democratic Leadership Council, and the Commission on the Future of Higher Education.
