= John Martin (Missouri politician) =

American politician

Member of the Missouri House of Representatives from the 44th district
- Incumbent
- Assumed office January 8, 2025
- Preceded by: Cheri Toalson Reisch

Personal details
- Party: Republican

John Martin (born 1968 or 1969) is an American politician who was elected member of the Missouri House of Representatives for the 44th district in 2024. The district covers the eastern and southern portions of Boone County, including the cities of Centralia, Hallsville, and Ashland.

Martin holds a degree in Political Science and Economics from Southwest Baptist University and a Master of Theology degree from Midwestern Baptist Seminary. Martin is a small business owner in Columbia.
