= Caleb Rowden =

American musician and politician

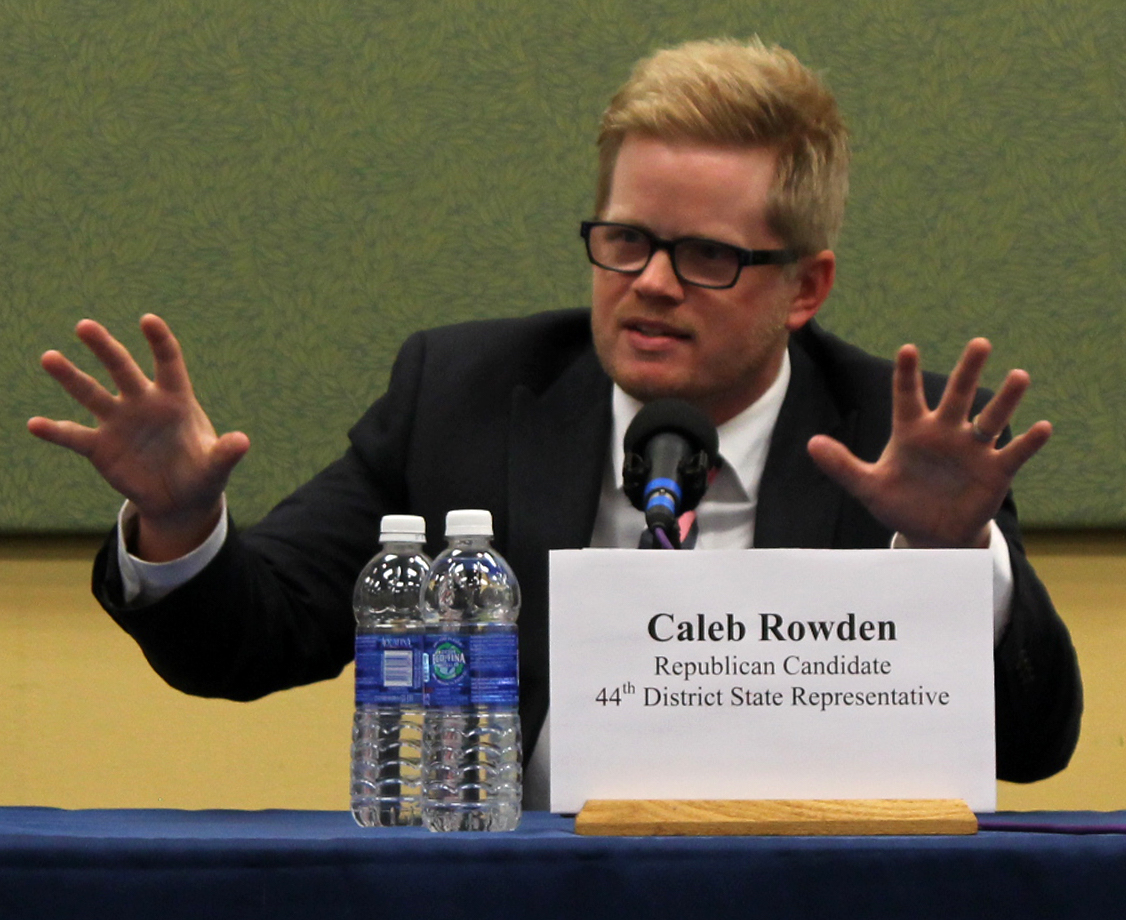
- Rowden in 2014

President pro tempore of the Missouri Senate
- In office January 4, 2023 – January 8, 2025
- Preceded by: Dave Schatz
- Succeeded by: Cindy O'Laughlin

Majority Leader of the Missouri Senate
- In office January 9, 2019 – January 4, 2023
- Preceded by: Mike Kehoe
- Succeeded by: Cindy O'Laughlin

Member of the Missouri Senate from the 19th district
- In office January 4, 2017 – January 8, 2025
- Preceded by: Kurt Schaefer
- Succeeded by: Stephen Webber

Member of the Missouri House of Representatives from the 44th district
- In office January 7, 2013 – January 4, 2017
- Preceded by: Jason Kander
- Succeeded by: Cheri Toalson Reisch

Personal details
- Born: October 22, 1982 (age 43) Joplin, Missouri, U.S.
- Party: Republican
- Spouse: Aubrey
- Education: University of Missouri, Columbia

Caleb Rowden (born October 22, 1982) is an American politician and former member of the Missouri State Senate for District 19 from 2017 to 2025. A member of the Republican Party, Rowden previously served in the Missouri House of Representatives from 2013 to 2017. In November 2018, Rowden was elected by his Republican colleagues to be the majority leader in the Missouri Senate's 2019 session. In October 2023, he announced his candidacy in the 2024 Missouri Secretary of State election. Later he decided not to run, and to end his time in politics

== Missouri Senate ==
Rowden was first elected in 2017, and was chosen to be the majority leader for the 2019 session. He became President pro tempore of the Missouri Senate in 2023.

=== Committee assignments ===
- Administration (Vice-Chairman)
- Gubernatorial Appointments (Vice-Chairman)
- Rules, Joint Rules, Resolutions and Ethics (Chairman)
- Select Committee on Redistricting
- Missouri Arts Council Trust Fund Board of Trustees
- Missouri Justice Reinvestment Task Force
- Missouri State Capitol Commission

=== Political issues ===
Rowden is an advocate for charter schools and tax-credit scholarships for private schools, and has received multiple donations from Rex Sinquefield. He introduced a bill in his final term to establish charters in Boone County, Missouri, despite wide opposition from local school boards and superintendents.

== Personal life ==
Rowden is married to Aubrey Rowden, the co-owner of Love Tree Studios, a wedding photography company. They have three children. Rowden himself owns Clarius Interactive, a media and marketing company. He attended the University of Missouri.

== Electoral history ==
=== State representative ===
2012 Republican Primary for Missouri's 44th House of Representative District
Party	Candidate	Votes	%	±%
Republican	Caleb Rowden	1,099	40.61	N/A
Republican	Dennis Smith	701	25.91	N/A
Republican	Mike Becker	491	18.14	N/A
Republican	Chris Dwyer	415	15.34	N/A
Total votes		2,706	100	

2012 General Election for Missouri's 44th House of Representatives District
Party	Candidate	Votes	%	±%
Republican	Caleb Rowden	7,996	51.02	
Democratic	Ken Jacob	7,676	48.98	
Total votes		15,672	100	

2014 General Election for Missouri's 44th House of Representatives District
Party	Candidate	Votes	%	±%
Republican	Caleb Rowden	5,249	63.19	
Democratic	Thomas Pauley	3,058	36.81	
Total votes		8,307	100	

=== State Senate ===
2016 General Election for Missouri's 19th Senate District
Party	Candidate	Votes	%	±%
Republican	Caleb Rowden	45,335	51.22	
Democratic	Stephen Webber	43,179	48.78	
Total votes		88,514	100	

2020 General Election for Missouri's 19th Senate District
Party	Candidate	Votes	%	±%
Republican	Caleb Rowden	50,570	51.60	+0.38
Democratic	Judy Baker	47,367	48.33	−0.45
Write-In	James Coyne	72	0.07	+0.07
Total votes		98,009	100	

Missouri House of Representatives
Preceded by Jason Kander	Member of the Missouri House of Representatives from the 44th district 2013–2017	Succeeded by Cheri Toalson Reisch
Missouri Senate
Preceded by Kurt Schaefer	Member of the Missouri Senate from the 19th district 2017–2025	Succeeded by Stephen Webber
Preceded by Mike Kehoe	Majority Leader of the Missouri Senate; 2019–2023	Succeeded by Cindy O'Laughlin
Preceded by Dave Schatz	President pro tempore of the Missouri Senate; 2023–2025	Succeeded by Cindy O'Laughlin
