= David Tyson Smith =

American attorney and politician

Member of the Missouri House of Representatives from the 46th district
- Incumbent
- Assumed office 2023
- Preceded by: Martha Stevens

Member of the Missouri House of Representatives from the 45th district
- In office 2021–2022
- Preceded by: Kip Kendrick
- Succeeded by: Kathy Steinhoff

Personal details
- Born: Columbia, Missouri, U.S.
- Party: Democratic
- Education: University of Missouri (BS); Tulane University (JD)

David Tyson Smith is an American attorney and politician serving as a member of the Missouri House of Representatives from the 46th District. He assumed office after a special election in April 2021 for district 45. Then after redistricting in 2022, his home placed in district 46.

== Early life and education ==
Smith was born and raised in Columbia, Missouri. He earned a Bachelor of Science degree in business administration from the University of Missouri and a Juris Doctor from the Tulane University Law School.

== Career ==
Smith worked as an attorney in New Orleans before returning to Columbia, where he founded Smith and Parnell LLC. In 2021, Smith was selected by the Boone County Democratic Committee to succeed Kip Kendrick in the Missouri House of Representatives. Smith later competed in a special election to fill the remainder of Kendrick's term. He became the first Black state representative for Columbia, as well as the first outside of St. Louis and Kansas City.

== Electoral history ==
Missouri House of Representatives Special Election, April 6, 2021, District 45
Party	Candidate	Votes	%	±%
Democratic	David Tyson Smith	1,801	75.20%	
Republican	Glenn Nielsen	594	24.80%	
Total votes		2,395	100.00%	

Missouri House of Representatives Election, November 8, 2022, District 46
Party	Candidate	Votes	%	±%
Democratic	David Tyson Smith	7,549	100.00%	+24.80
Total votes		7,549	100.00%	
