= USS Ozark (LSV-2) =

WW II warship

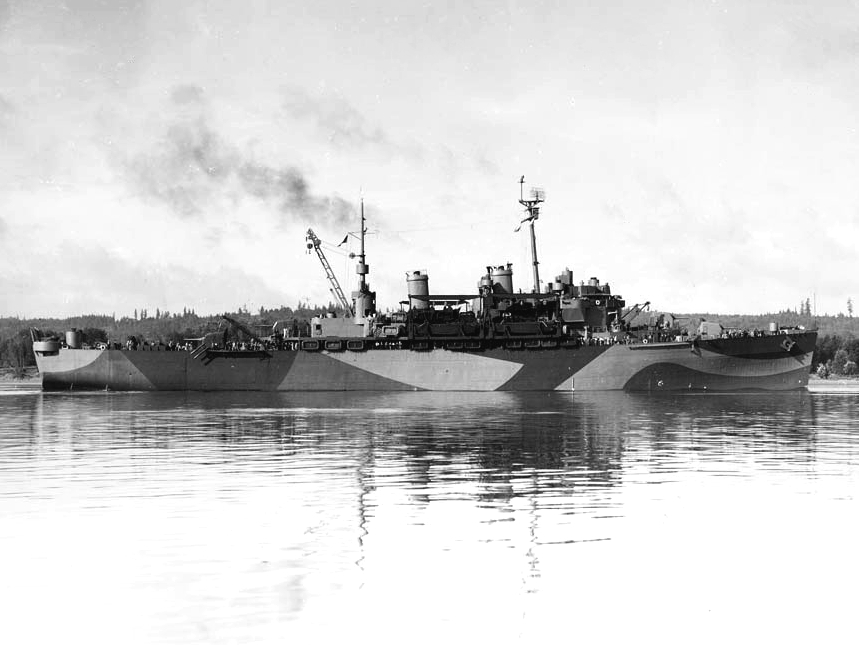
- USS Ozark on 16 September 1944

History

United States
- Name: USS Ozark
- Namesake: An Indian tribe of the Quapaw confederacy living in Missouri and Arkansas
- Ordered: as Mine Layer CM-7
- Builder: Willamette Iron and Steel Corp, Portland, Oregon
- Laid down: 12 July 1941
- Launched: 15 June 1942
- Sponsored by: Mrs. A. J. Byrholdt
- Commissioned: 23 September 1944
- Decommissioned: 1 April 1974
- Stricken: 1 April 1974
- Identification: LSV-2
- Honors and awards: Battle stars: Luzon, Iwo Jima, Okinawa – Won the Philippine Republic Presidential Unit Citation
- Fate: Sunk as a target off Destin, Florida 1981

General characteristics
- Class & type: Catskill-class vehicle landing ship
- Displacement: 5,875 tons (dockside); 9,040 tons (fully loaded)
- Length: 453 ft 0 in (138.07 m)
- Beam: 60 ft 2 in (18.34 m)
- Draft: 20 ft 0 in (6.10 m)
- Propulsion: Four Combustion Engineering 2-drum boilers, two General Electric geared turbines, two shafts
- Speed: 20 knots (37 km/h; 23 mph)
- Boats & landing craft carried: 31 DUKWs plus LCVPs (LSV configuration); 20 36 ft (11 m) MSLs (MCS configuration)
- Troops: 868 officers and enlisted (LSV configuration)
- Complement: 400+ officers and enlisted men
- Armament: 2 x single 5 in (130 mm)/38 dual-purpose gun mounts; 4 x twin 40 mm guns; 20 x single 20 mm guns
- Aircraft carried: Two helicopters (MCS configuration)

USS Ozark (LSV–2/CM-7/AP-107/MCS-2) was a Catskill-class vehicle landing ship built for the United States Navy during World War II. Named for the native American Ozark tribe of the Quapaw confederacy, she was the third U.S. Naval vessel to bear the name.

== Constructed in Oregon ==
Originally laid down as CM–7 by the Willamette Iron and Steel Corporation of Portland, Oregon 12 July 1941, the ship was launched on 15 June 1942; sponsored by Mrs. A. J. Byrholdt. Ozark, a $12,500,000 vessel, and her sister Catskill, were the largest naval vessels constructed in the Columbia River area to that time. The ship was redesignated AP–107 on 1 May 1943 and again redesignated LSV–2 on 21 April 1944. The vessel was commissioned on 23 September 1944.

Although in the midst of fighting WWII, it appears the ship never was actually completed and delivered to the USN and remained at her builder's yard during the period from her launch until her 1944 commissioning as an LSV.

== World War II service ==
=== Philippine operations ===
Following shakedown, Ozark sailed for Manus, Admiralty Islands, where she reported 16 November to Commander, U.S. 7th Fleet, for assignment to the 3rd Amphibious Force. After intensive training the new vehicle landing ship departed 31 December for Lingayen Gulf, Luzon, Philippine Islands as a unit of invasion Task Group 79.1.

On 9 January, S-Day for the Lingayen invasion, Ozark supplied 15 DUKWs carrying two battalions of supporting artillery, which were landed before noon.

=== Iwo Jima operations ===
Subsequent to that successful operation, she steamed for the Marianas where she joined Transport Squadron 15 at Saipan for the invasion of Iwo Jima. She landed three waves of troops there 19 February 1945 and continued logistic support to the beach until 27 February.

=== Supporting Okinawa operations ===
After transporting wounded marines to Guam for hospital care, Ozark reported to Transport Squadron 13 at Leyte rehearsing for the invasion of Okinawa. She landed her troops and equipment on Okinawa 1 April and again remained to lend logistic support to beach operations until departing 10 April for Guam.

=== End-of-war operations ===
With the end of World War II in the Pacific near, Ozark was chosen to transport select occupational units to Japan. In an operation that took two days working around the clock, 911 officers and men were transferred to her at sea by breeches buoy from 9 aircraft carriers, 3 battleships, 2 cruisers, and 6 destroyers.

Ozark entered Tokyo Bay 30 August where she debarked her special landing force. After making two complete tours with the "Magic Carpet" Fleet returning overseas troops to the United States after the war, Ozark transited the Panama Canal and arrived Barrow, Alaska 31 January 1946 where she was placed in upkeep status. She commenced pre-inactivation overhaul in Orange, Texas 14 March and decommissioned 29 June.

== Operating as MCS-2 ==
Ozark's hull classification was changed 7 February 1955 from LSV–2 to MCS–2. Struck from the Naval Vessel Register 1 September 1961, she was returned to the Maritime Administration and placed in the National Defense Reserve Fleet and berthed at Beaumont, Texas.

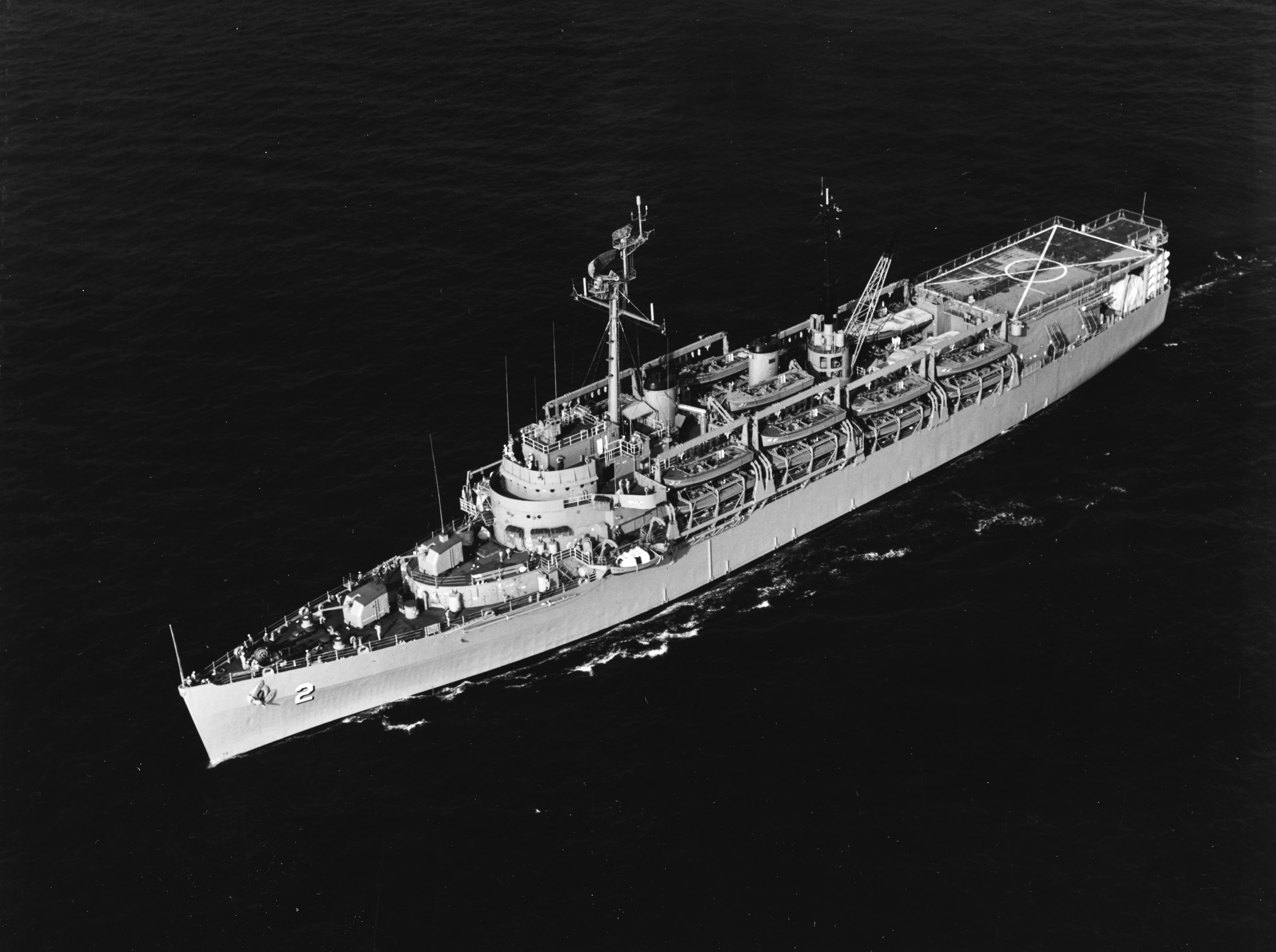
USS Ozark at sea on 31 August 1966

She was reacquired by the Navy 19 June 1963 for conversion to a mine countermeasures support ship under project SCB 123 by the Norfolk Shipbuilding and Drydock Corporation and reinstated on the Naval Register 1 October 1963. Recommissioned USS Ozark (MCS-2) on 24 June 1966 (complete with the ship's bell from the second Ozark (BM-7)) she was assigned to MinRon 8, homeported in Charleston, South Carolina where she became flagship for Commander, Mine Forces, U.S. Atlantic Fleet.

After shakedown and intensive training at Guantanamo Bay, she remained in port for the rest of the year. With the Navy's first minesweeping launches (MSL, Mark IV) and helicopters (RH-3A) on board, Ozark conducted her first mine countermeasures training in the Charleston area early in 1967.

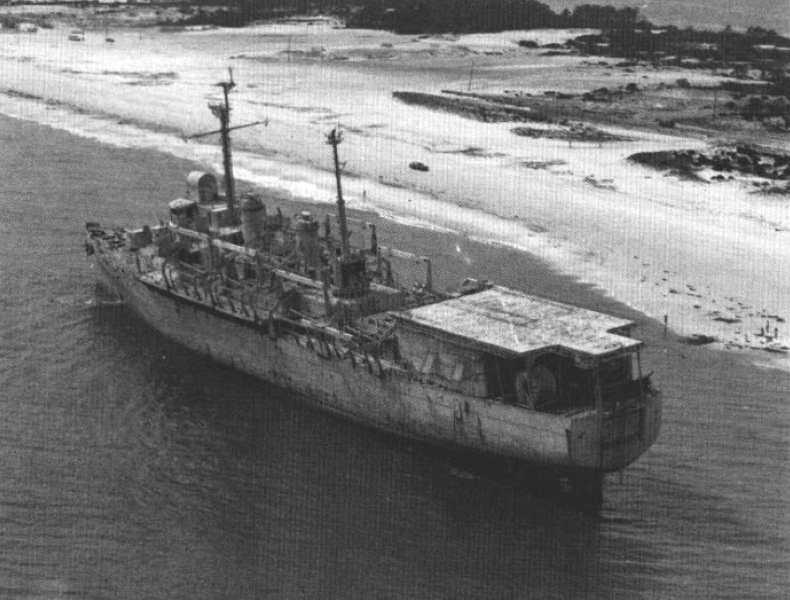
USS Ozark as a target ship, aground near Perdido Key in 1979

After a cruise to several western European ports in 1967, she continued to operate in the Charleston, South Carolina, area until deploying to the Mediterranean 18 November 1968. Returning to Charleston 14 February 1969 she began material maintenance and upkeep followed by periodic deployment to the West Indies and the South Atlantic Ocean. Decommissioned and struck from the Naval Register, 1 April 1974, she was towed to a location south of Destin, Florida and anchored there while being used as a target by the Air Force from Eglin Air Force Base. Ozark was hit multiple times with large practice (non-explosive) bombs but was not sunk. In September 1979, Ozark was ripped loose from her anchorage by Hurricane Frederic and driven onto the beach near Perdido Key, Florida. Naval units from Norfolk, Virginia, Pearl Harbor, Hawaii, and Hawthorne, Nevada, participated in a salvage effort that began in October 1979.

== Sinking ==
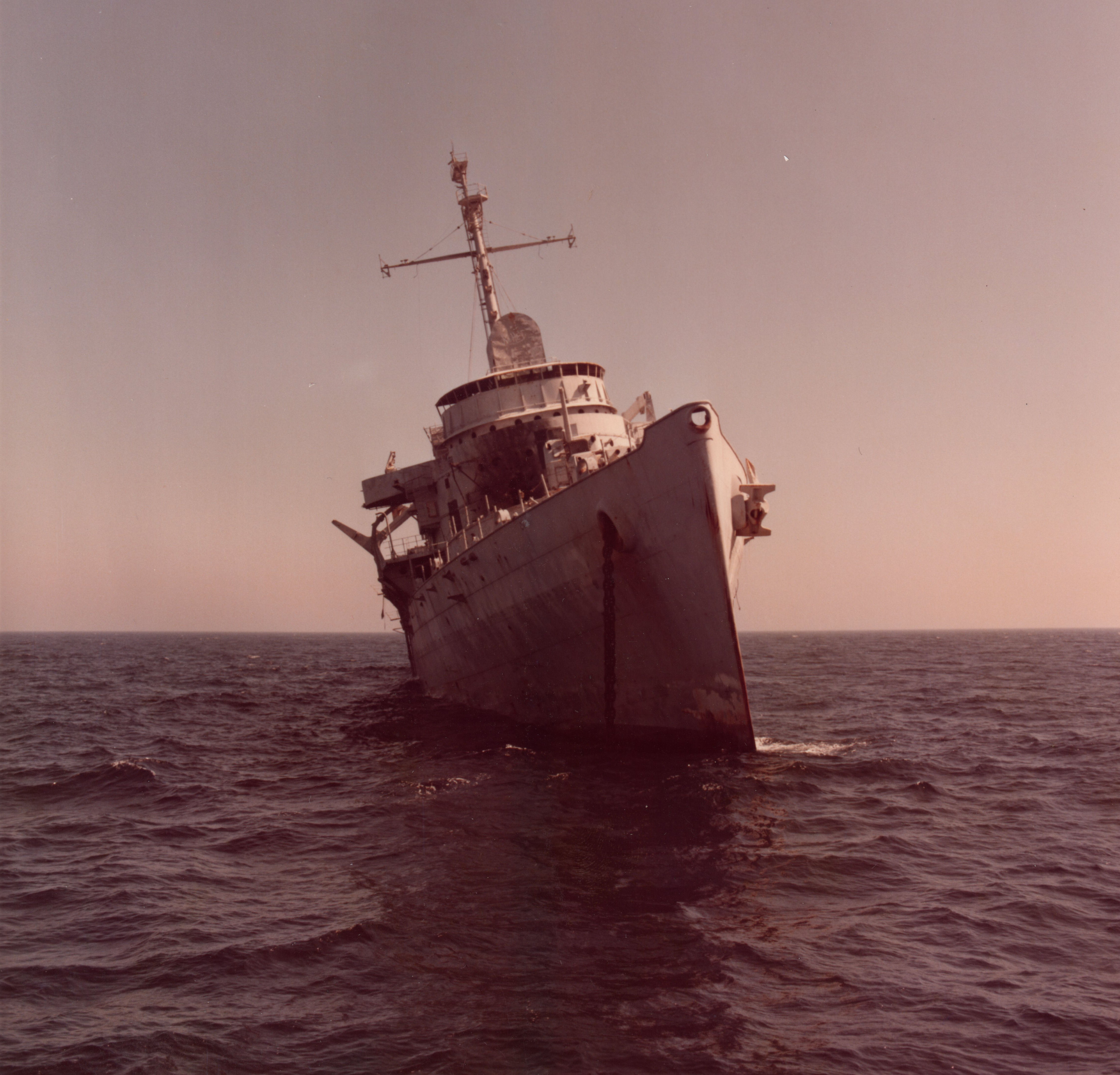
This photo shows Ozark listing at 16 degrees to starboard 12 hours before she sank.

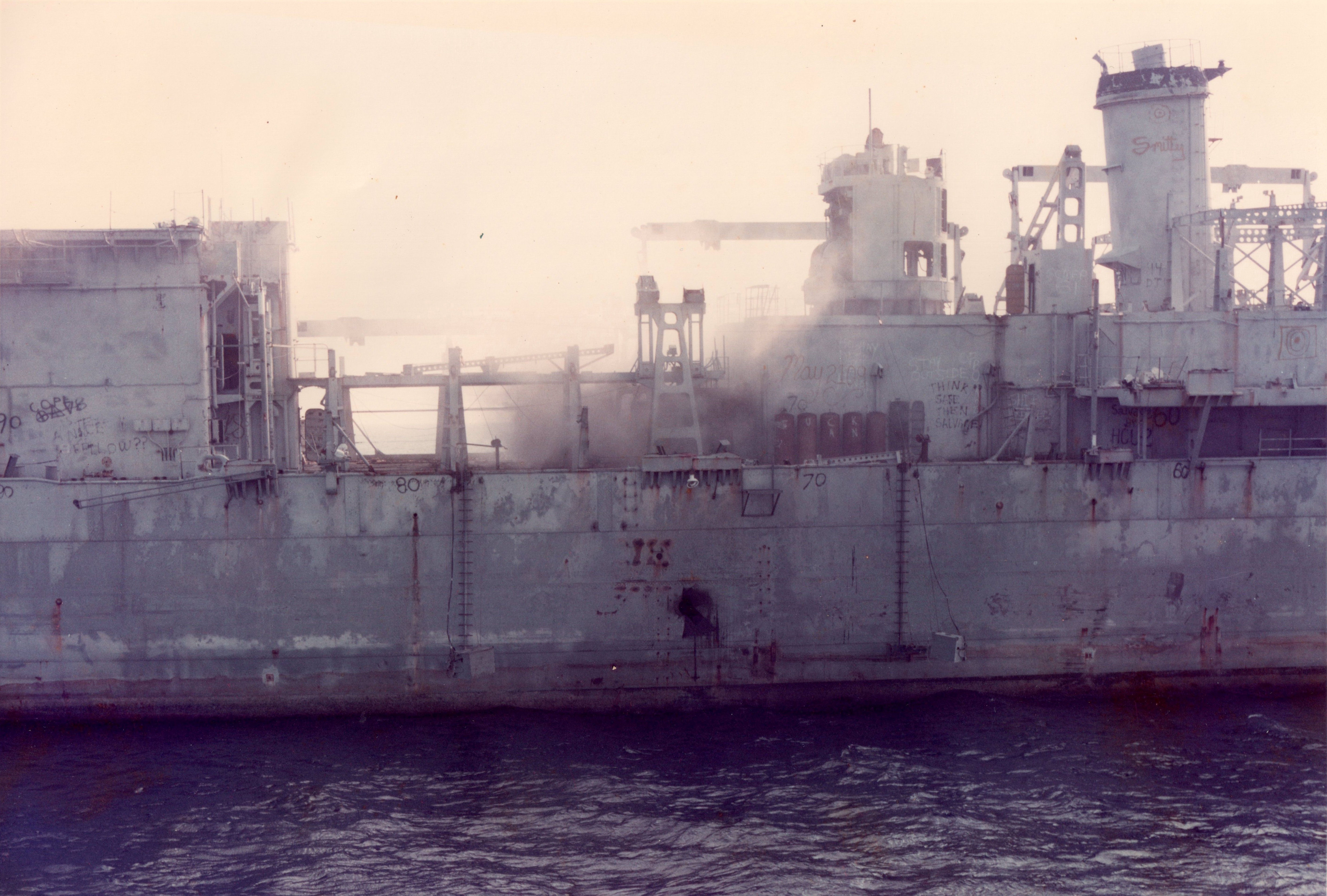
This photo shows the entry hole of a Maverick missile milliseconds after impact.

After salvage, she was returned to Destin, and unintentionally sunk with a Maverick missile launched from a United States Air Force F-4 Phantom II from Eglin Air Force Base in 1981. The missile's warhead entered on her starboard side approximately 13 feet (4.0 m) above the waterline, went through two decks, and exploded above the hull, leaving a hole approximately 3 feet (0.91 m) in diameter in her hull. The hole in the bottom of the ship was not noticed until the next day when U.S. Air Force personnel and Hughes Missile Systems Company engineers entered the ship for damage assessment. By this time, she was listing 16 degrees and all personnel were ordered off the ship. The wreck currently lies upright and intact in the Gulf of Mexico in approximately 330 feet (100 m) of water, 28 to 30 miles (45 to 48 km) due south of Destin at 29°55.101′N 86°34.952′W.

== Honors and awards ==
Ozark earned three battle stars for Luzon, Iwo Jima, and Okinawa operations as well as the Philippine Republic Presidential Unit Citation Badge for service in World War II.
