= Ozark High School =

Ozark High School may refer to:

- Ozark High School (Arkansas), Ozark, Arkansas
- Ozark High School (Missouri), Ozark, Missouri
