= University of Missouri College of Education & Human Development =

College of Education & Human Development
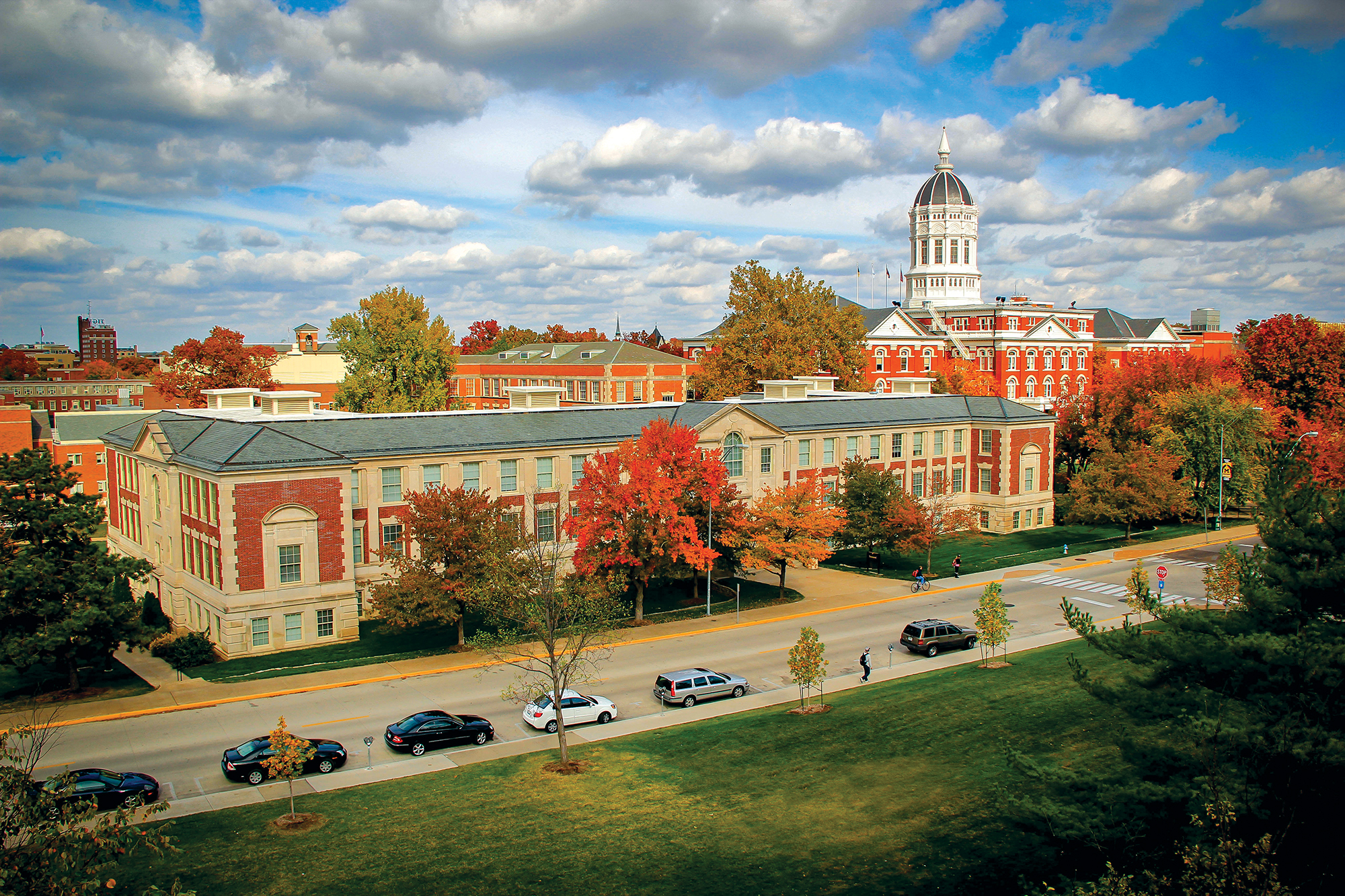
- Townsend Hall
- Type: Public
- Established: 1867
- Location: Columbia, Missouri, US; 38°56′43″N 92°19′47″W
- Website: cehd.missouri.edu

The University of Missouri College of Education & Human Development is located at the University of Missouri in Columbia, Missouri. The school is composed of six academic departments offering doctoral, graduate and undergraduate programs both on campus and online. Founded in 1867 as the state normal school, MU was one of the first state universities in the country to undertake the professional training of teachers as a regular part of its collegiate work. In 2021, the college became the College of Education & Human Development.

== Departments ==
- Department of Educational Leadership & Policy Analysis
- Department of Educational, School & Counseling Psychology
- Department of Human Development & Family Science
- Department of Learning, Teaching & Curriculum
- School of Information Science & Learning Technologies
- Department of Special Education
