= USS Ozark =

USS Ozark may refer to:

- USS Ozark (1863), the lead ship of her class of monitor, launched in 1863 and stricken in 1865.
- USS Ozark (BM-7), an Arkansas-class monitor, launched in 1900 and sold in 1922.
- USS Ozark (LSV-2), a Catskill-class vehicle landing ship, launched in 1942 and stricken in 1974.
