= Kevin Elmer =

American politician

Member of the Missouri House of Representatives from the 139th district
- In office January 9, 2013 – January 4, 2015
- Preceded by: Shane Schoeller
- Succeeded by: Jered Taylor

Member of the Missouri House of Representatives from the 141st district
- In office January 5, 2011 – January 9, 2013
- Preceded by: Jay Wasson
- Succeeded by: Tony Dugger

Personal details
- Born: December 18, 1970 (age 55) Salem, Missouri
- Party: Republican

Kevin Elmer (born December 18, 1970) is an American politician who served in the Missouri House of Representatives from 2011 to 2015.

Also a high school referee on his days off from being an administrative law judge, Kevin Elmer physically confronted a high school football player for innocuously celebrating a 43 yard catch by grabbing the player tightly by the jersey, redirecting him, and appeared to yell in the player's face. The sideline video captured the physical altercation, as well as Glendale’s head coach yelling that Elmer "needs to grow up".

Despite being a judge, Elmer used abusive, irrational behavior in the course of his duties which caused the Missouri State High School Activities Association (MSHSAA) to idefinitely suspend Elmer less than 24 hours after the game.
