= Kip Kendrick =

American politician (born 1981)

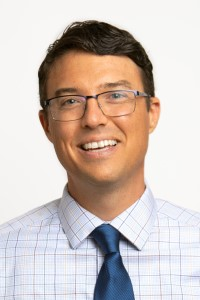

Member of the Missouri House of Representatives from the 45th district
- In office January 7, 2015 – January 6, 2021
- Preceded by: Chris Kelly
- Succeeded by: David Tyson Smith

Personal details
- Born: March 28, 1981 (age 45) Monroe City, Missouri, U.S.
- Party: Democratic

Kip Kendrick (born March 28, 1981) is an American politician who served in the Missouri House of Representatives for the 45th district from 2015 to 2021. In November 2020, Kendrick announced that he would resign from his seat in the House to serve as the chief of staff for State Senator Greg Razer.

Kip Kendrick ran for Boone County, Missouri, Presiding Commissioner in 2022 and was elected.
