= Ozark Trail =

Ozark Trail may refer to:

- Ozark Trail (hiking trail), a hiking and backpacking trail in Missouri
- Ozark Highlands Trail, a hiking and backpacking trail in Arkansas
- Ozark Trail (auto trail), an early network of locally maintained roads and highways
- Ozark Trail (brand name), a private-label brand name owned by Walmart
