= Government of Missouri =

The government of the U.S. state of Missouri is organized into the state government and local government, including county government, and city and municipal government.

While the state was originally a part of the Democratic-dominated "Solid South," the state transitioned into a national bellwether at the start of the 20th century. Its position in the Midwest allowed for the state to become competitive for Republicans much earlier than many of its neighbors. After voting Republican twice in its entire history up to that point, it became a near-perfect bellwether and voted for the national winner all but once from 1904 to 2004. However, the state has not voted Democratic since 1996. In 2008, Democrat Barack Obama became the first Democrat to ever win the presidency without winning the state. The state's rightward drift became apparent since, as in 2012, it voted for the losing candidate in consecutive elections for the first time since 1900. Republicans captured the state legislature and majority of House seats in the 2000s for the first time since the 1940s. Meanwhile, Democrats lost their last statewide office in the 2022 elections.

== State government ==
=== Constitution ===
The fourth and last Constitution of Missouri, the state constitution, was adopted in 1945. It provides for three branches of government: The legislative, executive, and judicial.

=== Legislative branch ===
The legislative branch consists of the state legislature, which is the Missouri General Assembly; it is bicameral & comprises a 163-member House of Representatives (the lower house) and a 34-member Senate. Members of both houses are subject to term limits: Senators are limited to two four-year terms, and representatives to four two-year terms; a limit of 8 years for members of both houses. The state constitution provides that "The general assembly shall meet on the first Wednesday after the first Monday in January following each general election. ..The general assembly shall reconvene on the first Wednesday after the first Monday of January after adjournment at midnight on May thirtieth of the preceding year." As a part-time legislature, compensation is low, and most senators and representatives hold jobs outside their legislative duties. As of 2024, state legislators receive an annual salary of $40,000, as set by the Missouri Citizens’ Commission on Compensation for Elected Officials. The General Assembly meets at the Missouri State Capitol in Jefferson City.

=== Executive branch ===
Missouri Government
| Governor of Missouri | Mike Kehoe (R) |
| Lieutenant Governor of Missouri: | David Wasinger (R) |
| Missouri Secretary of State: | Denny Hoskins (R) |
| Cabinet of Missouri |
| Missouri State Auditor: | Scott Fitzpatrick (R) |
| Missouri State Treasurer: | Vivek Malek (R) |
| Missouri Attorney General: | Catherine Hanaway (R) |
| United States Senator: | Josh Hawley (R) |
| United States Senator: | Eric Schmitt (R) |

The executive branch is laid out in Article IV of the state constitution. It is headed by the governor of Missouri. The governor is charged with executing the laws of the state. The governor is elected a four-year term and can serve two terms and must be at least 30 years of age, a Missouri resident for at least 10 years, and a U.S. citizen for at least 15 years before holding office. He can also appoint members of the Cabinet of Missouri. There is also the Lieutenant Governor of Missouri, required to have the same qualifications as the governor, who is an ex officio president of the state Senate. The lieutenant governor is allowed to debate any and all questions before the Senate as a whole and may cast the deciding ballot in case of a tie. Additionally, the lieutenant governor assumes the office of governor in case of the governor's death, resignation, or incapacitation. Missouri voters also elect the heads of several executive departments: the Missouri Attorney General, Missouri Secretary of State, State Treasurer of Missouri, and the State Auditor of Missouri. The requirements for holding these offices are the same as those for the governor, but only the State Treasurer has term limits similar to the governor.

=== Judicial branch ===
The judicial branch (the state courts) is established by Article IV of the Missouri Constitution. The state supreme court is the Supreme Court of Missouri - it is the highest court. The Missouri Court of Appeals is the state intermediate appellate court. It is split into three districts: Western (based in Kansas City), Eastern (based in St. Louis), and Southern (based in Springfield). The state trial courts of general jurisdiction are the 45 Missouri Circuit Courts and Associate Circuit Courts within each Circuit Court.

Seven judges sit on the Supreme Court of Missouri, which meets in the state capital, Jefferson City. Unlike the life tenure appointments of federal judges (including the Supreme Court of the United States), state supreme court judges hold the judicial bench for 12 years, as do judges of the Court of Appeals. Circuit Court judges have terms of six years and Associate Circuit Court judges have terms of four years. There are no term limits for judges, though there is a mandatory retirement age of 70 years.

Missouri pioneered a unique way of selecting judges for its state Supreme Court and Court of Appeals in an effort to remove some of the partisan politics from the selection process. Article V, Section 25(a) of the Missouri Constitution specifies a process, known as the Missouri Plan, to appoint judges to the state Supreme Court, Court of Appeals, and circuit and probate courts in the independent City of St. Louis, Jackson County (Kansas City), and any other circuit court where a majority of voters choose to adopt nonpartisan appointment (currently St. Louis County, Clay County, (St Charles County, Missouri) and Platte County). When a position becomes available in one of the above courts, a nonpartisan judicial nominating commission reviews applications, interviews candidates, and submits three nominees to the Governor. The Governor then appoints one of the three nominees to fill the vacant position. Finally, in the first general election one year or more after the appointment, the judge must be retained by the voters in a retention election before serving a full term. Judges for all other courts are elected directly by the voters.

== County and city government ==
Counties with more than 85,000 people may elect their own charters, smaller ones must use the standard charter dictated by the state.

Missouri allows cities to adopt their own charter should they chose to do so; it was the first state in the union to do so. Regardless of the freedom given to city governments, most municipalities choose to organize their local government around a mayor and a city council. Council members are typically elected in either citywide or district elections.

== Political parties ==
United States presidential election results for Missouri
| Year | Republican / Whig | | Democratic | | Third party(ies) | |
| Year | No. | % | No. | % | No. | % |
|---|---|---|---|---|---|---|
| 1824 | 159 | 4.63% | 1,166 | 33.97% | 2,107 | 61.39% |
| 1828 | 3,422 | 29.36% | 8,232 | 70.64% | 0 | 0.00% |
| 1832 | 0 | 0.00% | 5,192 | 100.00% | 0 | 0.00% |
| 1836 | 7,337 | 40.02% | 10,995 | 59.98% | 0 | 0.00% |
| 1840 | 22,954 | 43.37% | 29,969 | 56.63% | 0 | 0.00% |
| 1844 | 31,200 | 43.02% | 41,322 | 56.98% | 0 | 0.00% |
| 1848 | 32,671 | 44.91% | 40,077 | 55.09% | 0 | 0.00% |
| 1852 | 29,984 | 43.58% | 38,817 | 56.42% | 0 | 0.00% |
| 1856 | 0 | 0.00% | 57,964 | 54.43% | 48,522 | 45.57% |
| 1860 | 17,028 | 10.28% | 58,801 | 35.52% | 89,734 | 54.20% |
| 1864 | 72,750 | 69.72% | 31,596 | 30.28% | 0 | 0.00% |
| 1868 | 86,860 | 56.96% | 65,628 | 43.04% | 0 | 0.00% |
| 1872 | 119,196 | 43.65% | 151,434 | 55.46% | 2,429 | 0.89% |
| 1876 | 145,027 | 41.36% | 202,086 | 57.64% | 3,497 | 1.00% |
| 1880 | 153,647 | 38.67% | 208,600 | 52.51% | 35,042 | 8.82% |
| 1884 | 203,081 | 46.02% | 236,023 | 53.49% | 2,164 | 0.49% |
| 1888 | 236,252 | 45.31% | 261,943 | 50.24% | 23,165 | 4.44% |
| 1892 | 227,646 | 42.03% | 268,400 | 49.56% | 45,537 | 8.41% |
| 1896 | 304,940 | 45.25% | 363,667 | 53.96% | 5,299 | 0.79% |
| 1900 | 314,092 | 45.94% | 351,922 | 51.48% | 17,642 | 2.58% |
| 1904 | 321,449 | 49.93% | 296,312 | 46.02% | 26,100 | 4.05% |
| 1908 | 347,203 | 48.50% | 346,574 | 48.41% | 22,150 | 3.09% |
| 1912 | 207,821 | 29.75% | 330,746 | 47.35% | 159,999 | 22.90% |
| 1916 | 369,339 | 46.94% | 398,032 | 50.59% | 19,398 | 2.47% |
| 1920 | 727,162 | 54.56% | 574,799 | 43.13% | 30,839 | 2.31% |
| 1924 | 648,486 | 49.58% | 572,753 | 43.79% | 86,719 | 6.63% |
| 1928 | 834,080 | 55.58% | 662,562 | 44.15% | 4,079 | 0.27% |
| 1932 | 564,713 | 35.08% | 1,025,406 | 63.69% | 19,775 | 1.23% |
| 1936 | 697,891 | 38.16% | 1,111,043 | 60.76% | 19,701 | 1.08% |
| 1940 | 871,009 | 47.50% | 958,476 | 52.27% | 4,244 | 0.23% |
| 1944 | 761,524 | 48.43% | 807,804 | 51.37% | 3,146 | 0.20% |
| 1948 | 655,039 | 41.49% | 917,315 | 58.11% | 6,274 | 0.40% |
| 1952 | 959,429 | 50.71% | 929,830 | 49.14% | 2,803 | 0.15% |
| 1956 | 914,289 | 49.89% | 918,273 | 50.11% | 0 | 0.00% |
| 1960 | 962,221 | 49.74% | 972,201 | 50.26% | 0 | 0.00% |
| 1964 | 653,535 | 35.95% | 1,164,344 | 64.05% | 0 | 0.00% |
| 1968 | 811,932 | 44.87% | 791,444 | 43.74% | 206,126 | 11.39% |
| 1972 | 1,154,058 | 62.29% | 698,531 | 37.71% | 0 | 0.00% |
| 1976 | 927,443 | 47.47% | 998,387 | 51.10% | 27,770 | 1.42% |
| 1980 | 1,074,181 | 51.16% | 931,182 | 44.35% | 94,461 | 4.50% |
| 1984 | 1,274,188 | 60.02% | 848,583 | 39.98% | 0 | 0.00% |
| 1988 | 1,084,953 | 51.83% | 1,001,619 | 47.85% | 6,656 | 0.32% |
| 1992 | 811,159 | 33.92% | 1,053,873 | 44.07% | 526,533 | 22.02% |
| 1996 | 890,016 | 41.24% | 1,025,935 | 47.54% | 242,114 | 11.22% |
| 2000 | 1,189,924 | 50.42% | 1,111,138 | 47.08% | 58,830 | 2.49% |
| 2004 | 1,455,713 | 53.30% | 1,259,171 | 46.10% | 16,480 | 0.60% |
| 2008 | 1,445,814 | 49.36% | 1,441,911 | 49.23% | 41,386 | 1.41% |
| 2012 | 1,482,440 | 53.64% | 1,223,796 | 44.28% | 57,453 | 2.08% |
| 2016 | 1,594,511 | 56.38% | 1,071,068 | 37.87% | 162,687 | 5.75% |
| 2020 | 1,718,736 | 56.80% | 1,253,014 | 41.41% | 54,212 | 1.79% |
| 2024 | 1,751,986 | 58.49% | 1,200,599 | 40.08% | 42,742 | 1.43% |

Like the rest of the nation, the two dominant parties in Missouri are the Democratic Party and the Republican Party (whose state affiliates are the Missouri Democratic Party and the Missouri Republican Party, respectively). The state secretary of state also recognizes the Constitution Party and Libertarian Party as organized parties, although only five Libertarians currently hold elected office in Missouri.

The Democratic and Republican parties have been responsible for establishing the voting districts, casting votes in the Electoral College, and fielding candidates for the general elections, and helping to determine legislative policy and priorities.

== Federal representation ==
Missouri currently has eight House districts. In the 119th Congress, two of Missouri's seats are held by Democrats and six are held by Republicans:

- Missouri's 1st congressional district represented by Wesley Bell (D)
- Missouri's 2nd congressional district represented by Ann Wagner (R)
- Missouri's 3rd congressional district represented by Bob Onder (R)
- Missouri's 4th congressional district represented by Mark Alford (R)
- Missouri's 5th congressional district represented by Emanuel Cleaver (D)
- Missouri's 6th congressional district represented by Sam Graves (R)
- Missouri's 7th congressional district represented by Eric Burlison (R)
- Missouri's 8th congressional district represented by Jason Smith (R)

Missouri's two United States senators are Republicans Josh Hawley and Eric Schmitt, serving since 2019 and 2023, respectively.

Missouri is part of the United States District Court for the Eastern District of Missouri and the United States District Court for the Western District of Missouri in the federal judiciary. The district's cases are appealed to the St. Louis-based United States Court of Appeals for the Eighth Circuit.

== See also ==
- Alcohol laws of Missouri
- Constitution of Missouri
- Missouri Sunshine Law
