= Missouri Office of Administration =

Agency overview
- Formed: 1972
- Jurisdiction: Missouri
- Agency executives: Ken Zellers, Commissioner; Caroline Coulter, Deputy Commissioner

The Missouri Office of Administration is the service and administrative control agency for the state of Missouri. It was created in 1972 by a constitutional amendment to coordinate management functions of the state government. It is overseen by a commissioner appointed by the governor with the consent of the Senate. The commissioner then appoints the deputy commissioner, chief counsel and the directors of the divisions within the office.

== Divisions ==
There are seven divisions within the Office of Administration:

- Accounting - provides state government accounting and payroll services and publishes annual financial reports.
- Budget and Planning - provides budget instructions, reviews budget requests, and prepares the annual executive budget.
- Facilities Management, Design and Construction - provides asset management services to meet the facility needs of state agencies.
- General Services - provides essential support to state agencies.
- Information Technology Services - provides technology and communication services to state agencies.
- Personnel - provides human resources and leadership development information to state agencies.
- Purchasing - responsible for the procurement of all state-required supplies, materials, equipment and professional or general services.
