= Ken Jacob =

American politician

Ken Jacob (born January 23, 1949) is an American Democratic politician who served in the Missouri Senate and the Missouri House of Representatives from 1983 until 2004.

Born in St. Louis, Missouri, Jacob graduated from the University of Missouri with a bachelor of science degree in education. He also has master's degrees in education, counseling, and public administration and a J.D. degree also from the University of Missouri. He previously worked as an executive director of an adolescent treatment center in Columbia, Missouri.

Jacob resigned from the Missouri Senate to take a seat to the state Labor and Industrial Relations Commission under Governor Bob Holden. In 2013, Governor Jay Nixon appointed Jacob acting director of the Missouri's Division of Employment Security. Jacob made an unsuccessful bid for lieutenant governor in 2004 and an unsuccessful bid for Congress in 2008.

== Electoral history ==
=== State representative ===
Missouri House of Representatives, primary election, 1982, District 25
Primary election
Party	Candidate	Votes	%
Democratic	Ken Jacob	998	57.22%
Democratic	Peter Leo	746	42.78%
Total votes		1,744	100%
General election
Democratic	Ken Jacob	3,513	56.60%
Independent	Beth M. Wheeler	2,694	43.40%
Total votes		6,207	100%

Missouri House of Representatives election, 1984, District 25
Party	Candidate	Votes	%
Democratic	Ken Jacob	7,333	66.19%
Republican	Tom Dreschel	3,746	33.81%
Total votes		11,079	100%

Missouri House of Representatives election, 1986, District 25
Party	Candidate	Votes	%
Democratic	Ken Jacob	4,820	100%
Total votes		4,820	100%

Missouri House of Representatives election, 1988, District 25
Party	Candidate	Votes	%
Democratic	Ken Jacob	7,699	66.55%
Republican	Edwin D. Stewart	3,869	33.45%
Total votes		11,568	100%

Missouri House of Representatives election, 1990, District 25
Party	Candidate	Votes	%
Democratic	Ken Jacob	3,708	100%
Total votes		3,708	100%

Missouri House of Representatives election, 1992, District 25
Party	Candidate	Votes	%
Democratic	Ken Jacob	9,303	65.22%
Republican	Mike Korman	4,962	34.78%
Total votes		14,265	100%

Missouri House of Representatives election, 1994, District 25
Party	Candidate	Votes	%
Democratic	Ken Jacob	5,397	63.75%
Republican	Elizabeth V. Cully	3,069	36.25%
Total votes		8,466	100%

Missouri House of Representatives election, 2012, District 44
Party	Candidate	Votes	%
Republican	Caleb Rowden	7,996	51.02%
Democratic	Ken Jacob	7,676	48.98%
Total votes		15,672	100%

=== State Senate ===
Missouri Senate election, 1996, District 19
Primary election
Party	Candidate	Votes	%
Democratic	Ken Jacob	10,856	53.98%
Democratic	Don Stamper	9,256	46.02%
Total votes		20,112	100%
General election
Democratic	Ken Jacob	39,971	62.43%
Republican	Frank Martin	21,703	33.90%
Libertarian	Daniel Dodson	2,353	3.67%
Total votes		64,027	100%

Missouri Senate election, 2000, District 19
Party	Candidate	Votes	%
Democratic	Ken Jacob	41,426	57.64%
Republican	Randy Asbury	29,152	40.56%
Libertarian	John Dupuy	1,293	1.80%
Total votes		71,871	100%

=== Lieutenant governor ===
Missouri Lieutenant Governor primary election, August 3, 2004
Party	Candidate	Votes	%
Democratic	Bekki Cook	493,081	64.28%
Democratic	Ken Jacob	273,953	35.72%
Total votes		767,034	100%

=== United States Representative ===
Missouri's 9th Congressional District primary election, August 5, 2008
Party	Candidate	Votes	%
Democratic	Judy Baker	22,498	44.12%
Democratic	Steve Gaw	15,864	31.11%
Democratic	Lyndon Bode	6,565	12.88%
Democratic	Ken Jacob	6,060	11.89%
Total votes		50,987	100%
