= Missouri Department of Agriculture =

Agency overview
- Formed: 1906
- Jurisdiction: Missouri, United States
- Headquarters: Jefferson City, Missouri
- Agency executives: Chris Chinn, Director; J. Chris Klenklen, Deputy Director; Kristi Naught, General Counsel
- Website: agriculture.mo.gov

The Missouri Department of Agriculture (MDA) is an agency of the government of Missouri that reports to the Governor of Missouri. MDA is responsible for serving, promoting, and protecting the agricultural producers, processors, and consumers of Missouri's food, fuel, and fiber products.

MDA is under the direction and supervision of the Director of Agriculture. The current director is Chris Chinn, who was appointed by the governor and confirmed by the Missouri Senate on January 29, 2017.

== Organization ==
- Director of Agriculture
  - Deputy Director
    - Office of the Director
    - Ag Business Development Division
    - Animal Health Division
    - Grain Inspection and Warehousing Division
    - Plant Industries Division
    - Weights, Measures and Consumers Protection

== See also ==
- United States Department of Agriculture
