= National Register of Historic Places listings in Pettis County, Missouri =

Location of Pettis County in Missouri

This is a list of the National Register of Historic Places listings in Pettis County, Missouri.

This is intended to be a complete list of the properties and districts on the National Register of Historic Places in Pettis County, Missouri, United States. Latitude and longitude coordinates are provided for many National Register properties and districts; these locations may be seen together in a map.

There are 28 properties and districts listed on the National Register in the county.

This National Park Service list is complete through NPS recent listings posted April 24, 2026.

== Current listings ==
	Name on the Register	Image	Date listed	Location	City or town	Description
1	Bois d'Arc Cooperative Dairy Farm Historic District		September 27, 1991 (#91001407)	MO J near junction with Bois d'Arc Rd. 38°51′40″N 93°09′16″W	Hughesville	
2	Building at 217 West Main Street	Building at 217 West Main Street	October 24, 1996 (#96001189)	217 W. Main St. 38°42′39″N 93°13′46″W	Sedalia	
3	G and G Veterinary Hospital	G and G Veterinary Hospital	April 15, 2011 (#11000186)	711 W. Main St. 38°42′43″N 93°14′04″W	Sedalia	
4	William H. Gentry House	William H. Gentry House	November 14, 1997 (#97001434)	22970 Cherry Tree Ln. 38°44′38″N 93°15′31″W	Sedalia	
5	Harris House	Harris House	July 10, 1979 (#79001387)	705 W. 6th St. 38°42′22″N 93°14′06″W	Sedalia	
6	John T. and Lillian Heard House	John T. and Lillian Heard House	April 15, 2011 (#11000187)	200 W. Broadway Blvd. 38°42′15″N 93°13′46″W	Sedalia	
7	Hillview Cooperative Dairy Farm Historic District		September 27, 1991 (#91001399)	Junction of MO T and Hillview Rd. 38°49′41″N 93°21′29″W	Hughesville	
8	Hotel Bothwell	Hotel Bothwell	September 8, 1989 (#89001406)	103 E. Fourth St. 38°42′29″N 93°13′39″W	Sedalia	
9	C.C. Hubbard High School	C.C. Hubbard High School	July 3, 1997 (#97000628)	721 N. Osage Ave. 38°42′58″N 93°13′38″W	Sedalia	
10	Henry Jones Farmstead		December 3, 2008 (#08001129)	17000 Hwy. EE; 38°49′44″N 93°10′01″W	Sedalia	
11	McVey School	McVey School	October 14, 1999 (#99001255)	Junction of MO 50 and Rte M 38°41′59″N 93°11′23″W	Sedalia	
12	Missouri State Fairgrounds Historic District	Missouri State Fairgrounds Historic District	June 28, 1991 (#91000853)	Roughly bounded by US 65, Co. Rd. Y, Clarendon Rd. and the Missouri-Kansas-Texas RR tracks 38°41′40″N 93°15′23″W	Sedalia	
13	Missouri, Kansas and Texas Railroad Depot	Missouri, Kansas and Texas Railroad Depot	March 28, 1979 (#79001388)	600 E. 3rd St. 38°42′28″N 93°13′14″W	Sedalia	
14	Missouri/Sedalia Trust Company	Missouri/Sedalia Trust Company	March 29, 1983 (#83001034)	322 S. Ohio St. 38°42′28″N 93°13′41″W	Sedalia	
15	Osage Farms Type 315:13 Government Farmhouse		September 27, 1991 (#91001406)	MO J near junction with Miller Chapel Rd. 38°53′20″N 93°07′37″W	Hughesville	
16	Osage Farms Unit No. 1 Historic District		September 27, 1991 (#91001408)	MO D near junction with Moon Rd. 38°51′32″N 93°13′42″W	Hughesville	
17	Osage Farms Unit No. 25 Historic District	Osage Farms Unit No. 25 Historic District	September 27, 1991 (#91001405)	Houston Rd. near junction with Montgomery Rd. 38°53′29″N 93°15′27″W	Hughesville	
18	Osage Farms Unit No. 26 Historic District		September 27, 1991 (#91001409)	MO D near junction with High Point Rd. 38°51′21″N 93°14′44″W	Hughesville	
19	Osage Farms Unit No. 30 Historic District	Osage Farms Unit No. 30 Historic District	September 27, 1991 (#91001401)	Durley Rd. near junction with MO D 38°50′59″N 93°15′29″W	Hughesville	
20	Osage Farms Unit No. 31	Osage Farms Unit No. 31	September 27, 1991 (#91001402)	Durley Rd. near junction with MO D 38°50′59″N 93°15′35″W	Hughesville	
21	Osage Farms Unit No. 41	Osage Farms Unit No. 41	September 27, 1991 (#91001403)	Hill View Rd. near junction with McCubbin Rd. 38°52′17″N 93°20′43″W	Houstonia	
22	Osage Farms Unit No. 43 Historic District		September 27, 1991 (#91001410)	MO J near junction with Lowry Rd. 38°51′28″N 93°10′56″W	Hughesville	
23	Osage Farms Units No. 5 and No. 6 Historic District		September 27, 1991 (#91001404)	Range Line Rd. near junction with Trickum Rd. 38°54′35″N 93°16′43″W	Houstonia	All building have been demolished.
24	Osage Farms Units No. 8 and No. 9 Historic District		September 27, 1991 (#91001400)	MO D near junction with MO T 38°51′48″N 93°21′33″W	Houstonia	
25	Sedalia Commercial Historic District	Sedalia Commercial Historic District	June 28, 2001 (#01000687)	Roughly Ohio, Lamine, W. Main, E. Main, and parts of 2nd through 5th Sts.; also 700-712 S. Ohio, 200 S. Moniteau, 101-108 W. Pacific, 104-220 W. Main, 208-400 W. 2nd, 200 W. 4th, and 102-120 E. 5th. 38°42′26″N 93°13′41″W	Sedalia	
26	Sedalia Public Library	Sedalia Public Library	January 10, 1980 (#80002389)	311 W. 3rd St. 38°42′30″N 93°13′50″W	Sedalia	
27	Gen. David Thomson House	Gen. David Thomson House	October 4, 1982 (#82000588)	S of Hughesville on SR H 38°46′52″N 93°16′20″W	Hughesville	
28	Thomas and Mildred Yount House		December 12, 2022 (#100008449)	1809 West Third St. 38°42′33″N 93°14′54″W	Sedalia	

== See also ==
- List of National Historic Landmarks in Missouri
- National Register of Historic Places listings in Missouri
