= Houstonia =

Houstonia may refer to:

- Houstonia, Missouri, a city in Missouri
- Houstonia (plant), a genus of flowering plants, belonging to the madder family (Rubiaceae)
- Houstonia (magazine), a magazine
- Houstonia (insect), a genus of wasp, belonging to the family Eurytomidae
