= John T. Heard =

American politician (1840–1927)

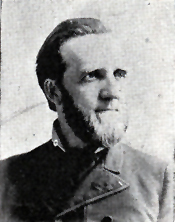

Member of the U.S. House of Representatives from Missouri
- In office March 4, 1885 – March 3, 1895
- Preceded by: John Cosgrove
- Succeeded by: John Plank Tracey
- Constituency: 6th district (1885–1893); 7th district (1893–1895)

Member of the Missouri House of Representatives from the Pettis County district
- In office 1872–1875

Member of the Missouri Senate from the 19th district
- In office 1880–1884

Personal details
- Born: John Taddeus Heard; October 29, 1840 Georgetown, Missouri, US
- Died: January 27, 1927 (aged 86) Los Angeles, California, US
- Party: Democratic
- Education: University of Missouri
- Occupation: Politician

John Taddeus Heard (October 29, 1840 – January 27, 1927) was an American politician. He was a member of the United States House of Representatives from Missouri.

== Biography ==
Heard was born on October 29, 1840, in Georgetown, Missouri, the son of lawyer and educator George Heard. He was educated at public schools, graduating from the University of Missouri on July 4, 1860, with a Master of Science. In 1862, he was admitted to the bar, after which he practiced law in Sedalia with his father and later his brother until 1876.

A Democrat, Heard represented Pettis County in the Missouri House of Representatives from 1872 to 1875, then represented Missouri's 19th Senate district in the Missouri Senate from 1873 to 1874. He represented Missouri in the United States House of Representatives from March 4, 1885 to March 3, 1995; he represented the 6th congressional district between 1885 and 1893, and the 7th between 1893 and 1895. Early in his tenure, The New York Times wrote about a time he discretely ordered "cold tea" (euphemism for whiskey), and the server shouted "your whiskey sir", which caused Heard to blush.

While serving in the 53rd Congress, he was chairman of the United States House Committee on Oversight and Government Reform. He was later a delegate of the 1904 Democratic National Convention.

After serving in Congress, he worked as a banker, leading the Sedalia Trust Company from 1901 to 1904. His first wife died before he entered Congress, and while serving, he met and married Lillian Copeland. He retired in 1922, dying on January 27, 1927, aged 86, at The Biltmore Hotel in Los Angeles. He is buried in the Crown Hill Cemetery, in Sedalia. His house, the John T. and Lillian Heard House in Sedalia, was listed on the National Register of Historic Places in 2011.

U.S. House of Representatives
Preceded by John Cosgrove	Member of the U.S. House of Representatives from Missouri's 6th congressional district 1885–1893	Succeeded by David A. De Armond
Preceded by Richard Henry Norton	Member of the U.S. House of Representatives from Missouri's 7th congressional district 1893–1895	Succeeded by John Plank Tracey
