= Sedalia station =

Sedalia, MO
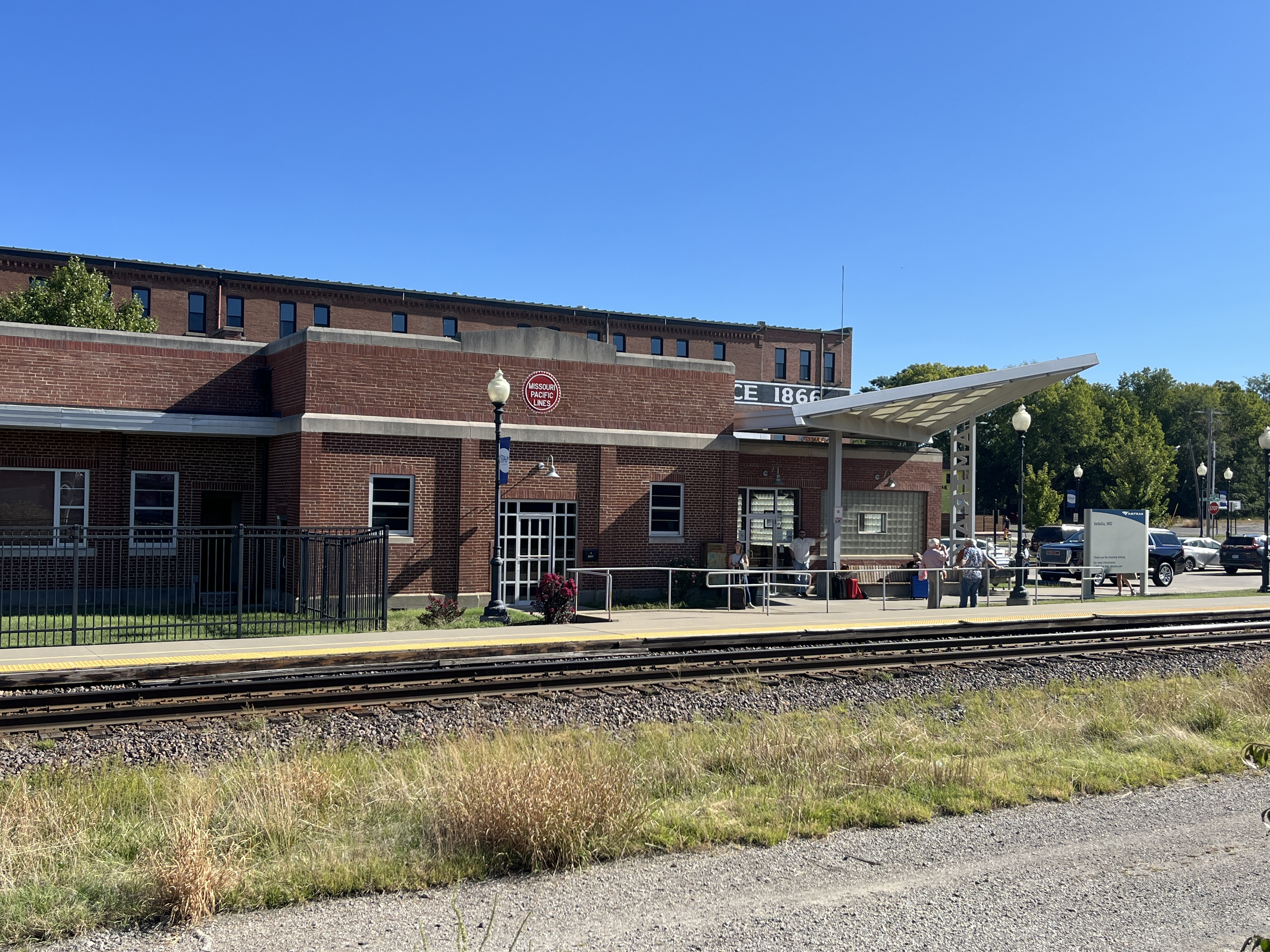
- Sedalia station in September 2024

General information
- Location: Pacific Street and North Osage Avenue; Sedalia, Missouri; United States
- Coordinates: 38.71158°N 93.22837°W
- Line: UP Sedalia Subdivision
- Platforms: 1 side platform
- Tracks: 1

Construction
- Accessible: Yes

Other information
- Station code: Amtrak: SED

History
- Opened: 1860s
- Rebuilt: 1886, 1951, 2011

Passengers
- FY 2025: 10,276 (Amtrak)

Services
Preceding station	Amtrak	Following station
Warrensburg toward Kansas City	Missouri River Runner	Jefferson City toward St. Louis
Former services
Preceding station	Amtrak	Following station
Warrensburg toward Kansas City	National Limited	Jefferson City toward New York or Washington, D.C.
Preceding station	Missouri Pacific Railroad	Following station
Knob Noster toward Kansas City	Main Line	Otterville toward St. Louis
Location

Sedalia station is an Amtrak train station in Sedalia, Missouri, United States. It is served by the Missouri River Runner. Built in 1886 the station building was substantially renovated in 1951. It was restored in the early 20th century.

== History ==
=== Missouri Pacific ===
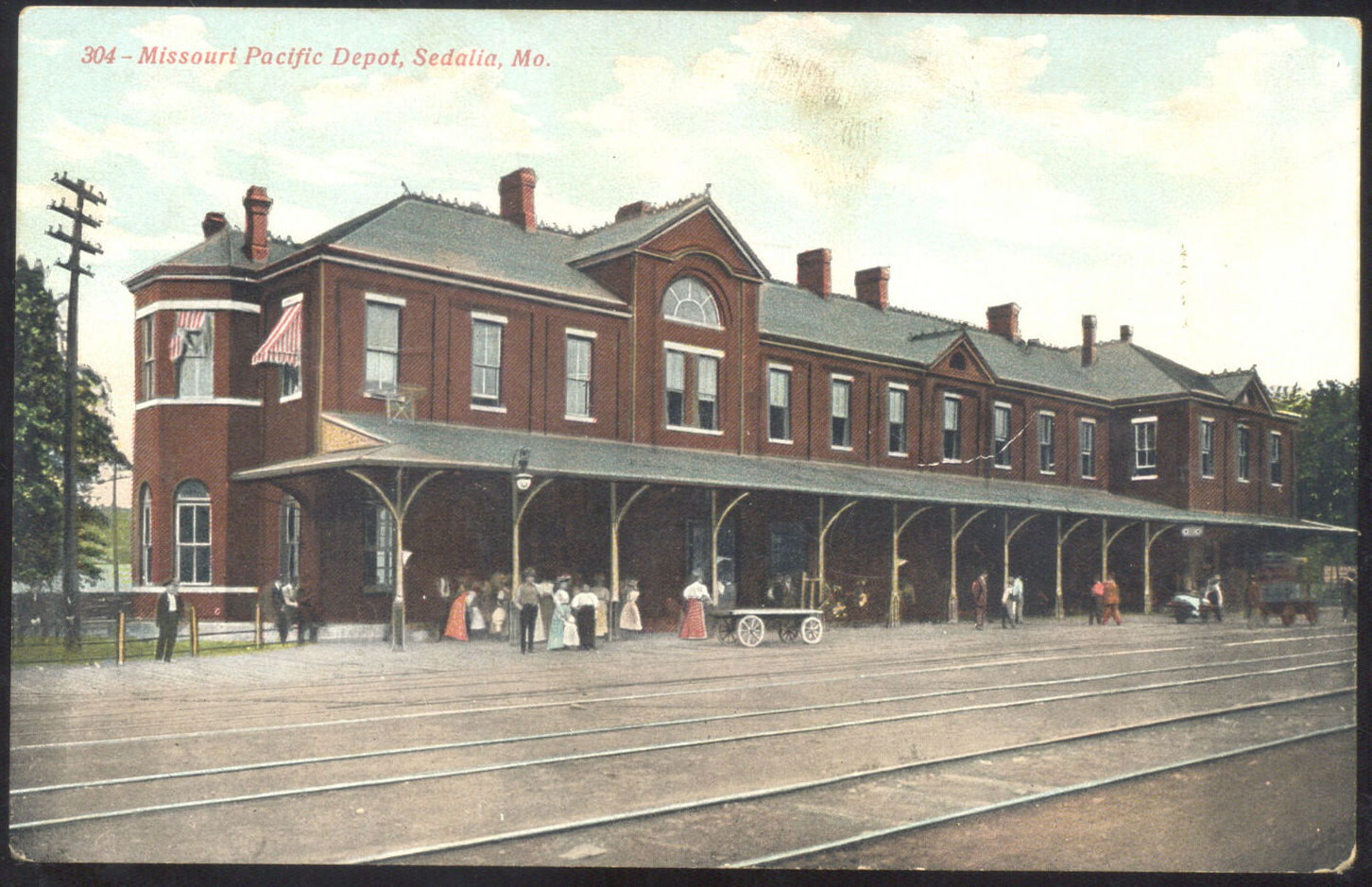
Early-20th-century postcard of the station

Sedalia was founded in 1860 in anticipation of the arrival of the Pacific Railroad, for which it was the western terminal during the Civil War. The line was completed west to Kansas City on September 19, 1865, leaving Sedalia as an intermediate station. The Ives House, a hotel on Pacific Street, served as the first station. In 1870, the Missouri-Kansas-Texas Railroad (Katy) was built through Sedalia. The Pacific Railroad became the Missouri Pacific Railroad (MP) in 1872.

In 1886, the MP constructed a two-story brick Queen Anne style station at a cost of $35,000. The second story housed railroad offices. It served as a union station until the Katy built a separate depot to the east in 1896. The Katy built a large ship facility in Sedalia in 1898, as did the MP in 1904.

The station was substantially renovated in 1951. The second story was removed and the ground floor was rebuilt in the International Style. It was divided into three sections, with the east section for freight and baggage. The Katy closed its Sedalia shops in 1957, while the MP shops remained in use until the 1980s. By 1971, the MP operated two daily round trips between Kansas City and St. Louis via Sedalia.

=== Amtrak ===
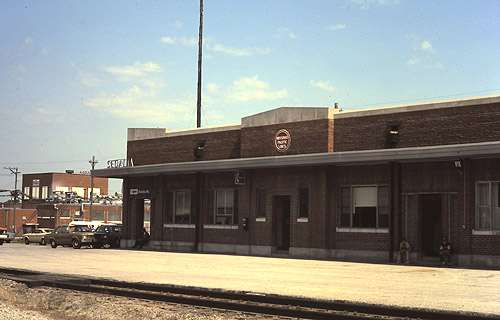
Sedalia station in 1982

Amtrak took over intercity passenger rail in the United States on May 1, 1971. Sedalia was initially served by the daily New York–Kansas City Spirit of St. Louis (soon renamed National Limited) until October 1, 1979. The station building was closed by that time. The Chicago–Kansas City Ann Rutledge began service on October 28, 1979; it was joined by the St. Louis–Kansas City Mules on October 26, 1980. The Mules operated as part of the Kansas City–New Orleans River Cities from April 29, 1984, to November 4, 1993. The Ann Rutledge and Mules were renamed as the Missouri River Runner in 2009.

In 2000, the nonprofit Sedalia Downtown Development, Inc (SDDI) purchased the station building from the Union Pacific Railroad. A two-phase, $2 million renovation restored the station building for use. The first phase fixed water infiltration and other state of good repair issues; the second phase restored the interior for office and Amtrak use. The waiting room, located in the former freight/baggage room, opened for passenger use in May 2011. Amtrak also constructed a new accessible platform in 2010.
