= Buffalo Creek (Blackwater River tributary) =

Stream in the American state of Missouri

Coordinates: 38°56′19″N 93°19′31″W

Buffalo Creek is a stream in northern Pettis and southern Saline counties in the U.S. state of Missouri. It is a tributary of Blackwater River.

The stream headwaters arise in northern Pettis County southeast of Houstonia and it flows north past the east side of Houstonia to enter the Blackwater River just north of the Pettis-Saline county line.

Buffalo Creek was so named due to reports of buffalo in the area.

== See also ==
- List of rivers of Missouri
