= Hughesville, Missouri =

Village in Pettis County, Missouri, United States

- Village
- Location of Hughesville, Missouri
- Coordinates: 38°50′13″N 93°17′43″W
- Country: United States
- State: Missouri
- County: Pettis
- Incorporated: 1905

Area
  - Total: 0.12 sq mi (0.30 km^{2})
  - Land: 0.12 sq mi (0.30 km^{2})
  - Water: 0 sq mi (0.00 km^{2})
- Elevation: 814 ft (248 m)

Population (2020)
  - Total: 150
  - Density: 1,296.2/sq mi (500.48/km^{2})
- Time zone: UTC-6 (Central (CST))
  - Summer (DST): UTC-5 (CDT)
- ZIP code: 65334
- Area code: 660
- FIPS code: 29-33652
- GNIS feature ID: 2398557

Hughesville is a village in north central Pettis County, Missouri, United States. As of the 2020 census, Hughesville had a population of 150.

== History ==
Hughesville was platted in 1871 by Reece Hughes, who gave the town his last name. A post office called Hughesville has been in operation since 1872.

The Osage Farms Resettlement Properties in Pettis County, Missouri includes properties listed on the National Register of Historic Places in 1991. The Gen. David Thomson House was listed in 1982.

== Geography ==
Hughesville is located on Missouri Route H approximately nine miles northwest of Sedalia.

According to the United States Census Bureau, the village has a total area of 0.12 square miles (0.31 km^{2}), all land.

== Demographics ==
Historical population
Census	Pop.	Note	%±
1960	134		—
1970	92		−31.3%
1980	152		65.2%
1990	174		14.5%
2000	174		0.0%
2010	183		5.2%
2020	150		−18.0%
U.S. Decennial Census

=== 2010 census ===
As of the census of 2010, there were 183 people, 70 households, and 49 families living in the village. The population density was 1,525.0 inhabitants per square mile (588.8/km^{2}). There were 75 housing units at an average density of 625.0 per square mile (241.3/km^{2}). The racial makeup of the village was 99.5% White and 0.5% from two or more races. Hispanic or Latino of any race were 1.6% of the population.

There were 70 households, of which 32.9% had children under the age of 18 living with them, 55.7% were married couples living together, 8.6% had a female householder with no husband present, 5.7% had a male householder with no wife present, and 30.0% were non-families. 24.3% of all households were made up of individuals, and 12.9% had someone living alone who was 65 years of age or older. The average household size was 2.61 and the average family size was 3.12.

The median age in the village was 37.5 years. 26.8% of residents were under the age of 18; 7.6% were between the ages of 18 and 24; 25.1% were from 25 to 44; 26.2% were from 45 to 64; and 14.2% were 65 years of age or older. The gender makeup of the village was 53.0% male and 47.0% female.

=== 2000 census ===
As of the census of 2000, there were 174 people, 65 households, and 49 families living in the village. The population density was 1,527.5 inhabitants per square mile (589.8/km^{2}). There were 69 housing units at an average density of 605.7 per square mile (233.9/km^{2}). The racial makeup of the village was 98.28% White and 1.72% Pacific Islander. Hispanic or Latino of any race were 0.57% of the population.

There were 65 households, out of which 38.5% had children under the age of 18 living with them, 67.7% were married couples living together, 9.2% had a female householder with no husband present, and 23.1% were non-families. 16.9% of all households were made up of individuals, and 10.8% had someone living alone who was 65 years of age or older. The average household size was 2.68 and the average family size was 3.10.

In the village, the population was spread out, with 24.1% under the age of 18, 9.2% from 18 to 24, 35.6% from 25 to 44, 20.1% from 45 to 64, and 10.9% who were 65 years of age or older. The median age was 35 years. For every 100 females, there were 100.0 males. For every 100 females age 18 and over, there were 91.3 males.

The median income for a household in the village was $30,833, and the median income for a family was $34,063. Males had a median income of $23,214 versus $17,188 for females. The per capita income for the village was $14,576. None of the families and 5.7% of the population were living below the poverty line, including no under eighteens and 31.3% of those over 64.

== Education ==
Hughesville is home to the public high school, Northwest. Northwest's mascot is the Mustang and competes in 8-man Football, Volleyball, Girls and Boys Basketball, Softball and Baseball, and Cheerleading.

== Parks ==
Hughesville has one park towards the western part of the village.

== See also ==
- List of cities in Missouri
