= John P. Tracey =

American politician from Missouri (1836–1910)

John Plank Tracey
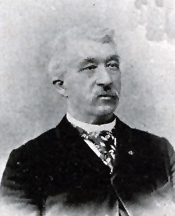

Member of the U.S. House of Representatives from Missouri's 7th district
- In office March 4, 1895 – March 3, 1897
- Preceded by: John T. Heard
- Succeeded by: James Cooney

Personal details
- Born: September 18, 1836 Wayne County, Ohio, U.S.
- Died: July 24, 1910 (aged 73) Springfield, Missouri, U.S.
- Party: Republican
- Profession: lawyer

John Plank Tracey (September 18, 1836 – July 24, 1910) was a U.S. representative from Missouri.

Born in Wayne County, Ohio, Tracey attended the public schools of Ohio and Indiana. He studied law. He taught school. He moved to Missouri in 1858. Enlisted as a private in the Union Army March 1, 1862, and served until March 10, 1865, when he was mustered out with the rank of first lieutenant. Commissioned lieutenant colonel of Missouri Enrolled Militia in April 1865. He was admitted to the bar in May 1865 and commenced practice in Stockton, Missouri. He moved to Springfield, Missouri, in 1874 and engaged in journalism. He was an unsuccessful candidate for railroad commissioner in 1878. Commissioned United States marshal for the western district of Missouri February 4, 1890, and served until March 4, 1894.

Tracey was elected as a Republican to the Fifty-fourth Congress (March 4, 1895 – March 3, 1897). He was an unsuccessful candidate for reelection in 1896 to the Fifty-fifth Congress. He served as member of the State house of representatives in 1903 and 1904. Superintendent of the Soldiers' Home at St. James, Missouri, in 1909 and 1910. He engaged in newspaper work in Springfield, Missouri, where he died July 24, 1910. He was interred in Hazelwood Cemetery.

U.S. House of Representatives
Preceded by John T. Heard	Member of the U.S. House of Representatives from Missouri's 7th congressional district 1895–1897	Succeeded by James Cooney
