= Courtney W. Hamlin =

American politician (1858–1950)

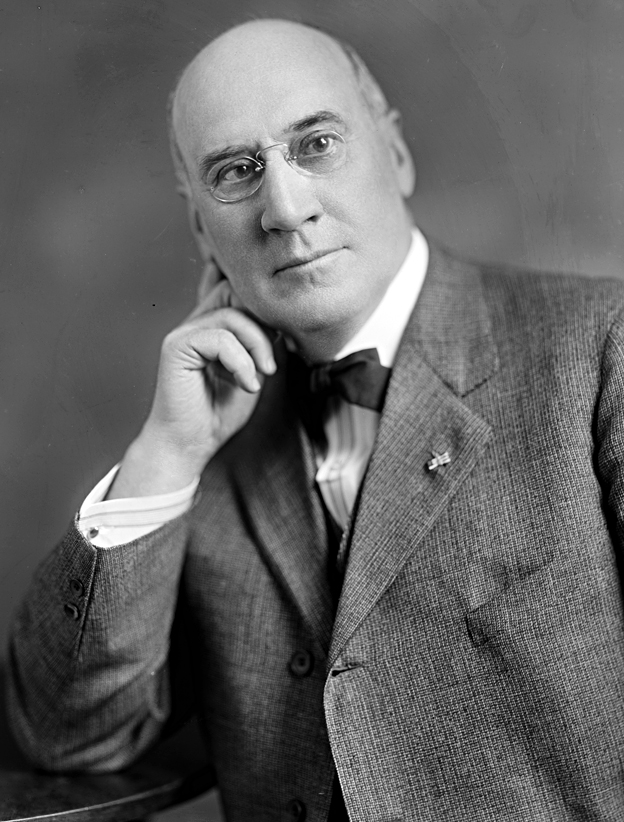

Member of the U.S. House of Representatives from Missouri's 7th district
- In office March 4, 1907 – March 3, 1919
- Preceded by: John Welborn
- Succeeded by: Samuel C. Major
- In office March 4, 1903 – March 3, 1905
- Preceded by: James Cooney
- Succeeded by: John Welborn

Personal details
- Born: Courtney Walker Hamlin; October 27, 1858 Brevard, North Carolina, U.S.
- Died: February 16, 1950 (aged 91) Santa Monica, California, U.S.
- Resting place: East Lawn Cemetery, Springfield, Missouri, U.S.
- Party: Democratic
- Profession: Politician, lawyer

Courtney Walker Hamlin (October 27, 1858 – February 16, 1950) was a U.S. representative from Missouri and cousin of William Edward Barton.

== Early life ==
Hamlin was born in Brevard, North Carolina. In 1869 moved to Missouri with his parents, who settled in Leasburg, Crawford County. He attended the common schools and Salem Academy, where he studied law. He was admitted to the bar in 1882 and commenced practice in Bolivar, Missouri.

== Political career ==
Hamlin was elected as a Democrat to the Fifty-eighth Congress (March 4, 1903 – March 3, 1905). He was an unsuccessful candidate for reelection in 1904 to the Fifty-ninth Congress. Hamlin was elected to the Sixtieth and to the five succeeding Congresses (March 4, 1907 – March 3, 1919). He served as chairman of the Committee on Expenditures in the Department of State (Sixty-second through Sixty-fifth Congresses). He was an unsuccessful candidate for renomination in 1918.

== Later life ==
He resumed the practice of law in Springfield, Missouri, until November 1935, when he retired and moved to Santa Monica, California, where he died February 16, 1950. He was interred in East Lawn Cemetery in Springfield, Missouri.

U.S. House of Representatives
Preceded by James Cooney	Member of the U.S. House of Representatives from Missouri's 7th congressional district 1903–1905	Succeeded by John Welborn
Preceded by John Welborn	Member of the U.S. House of Representatives from Missouri's 7th congressional district 1907–1919	Succeeded by Samuel C. Major
