= Warrensburg station =

Train station in Missouri, U.S.

Warrensburg, MO
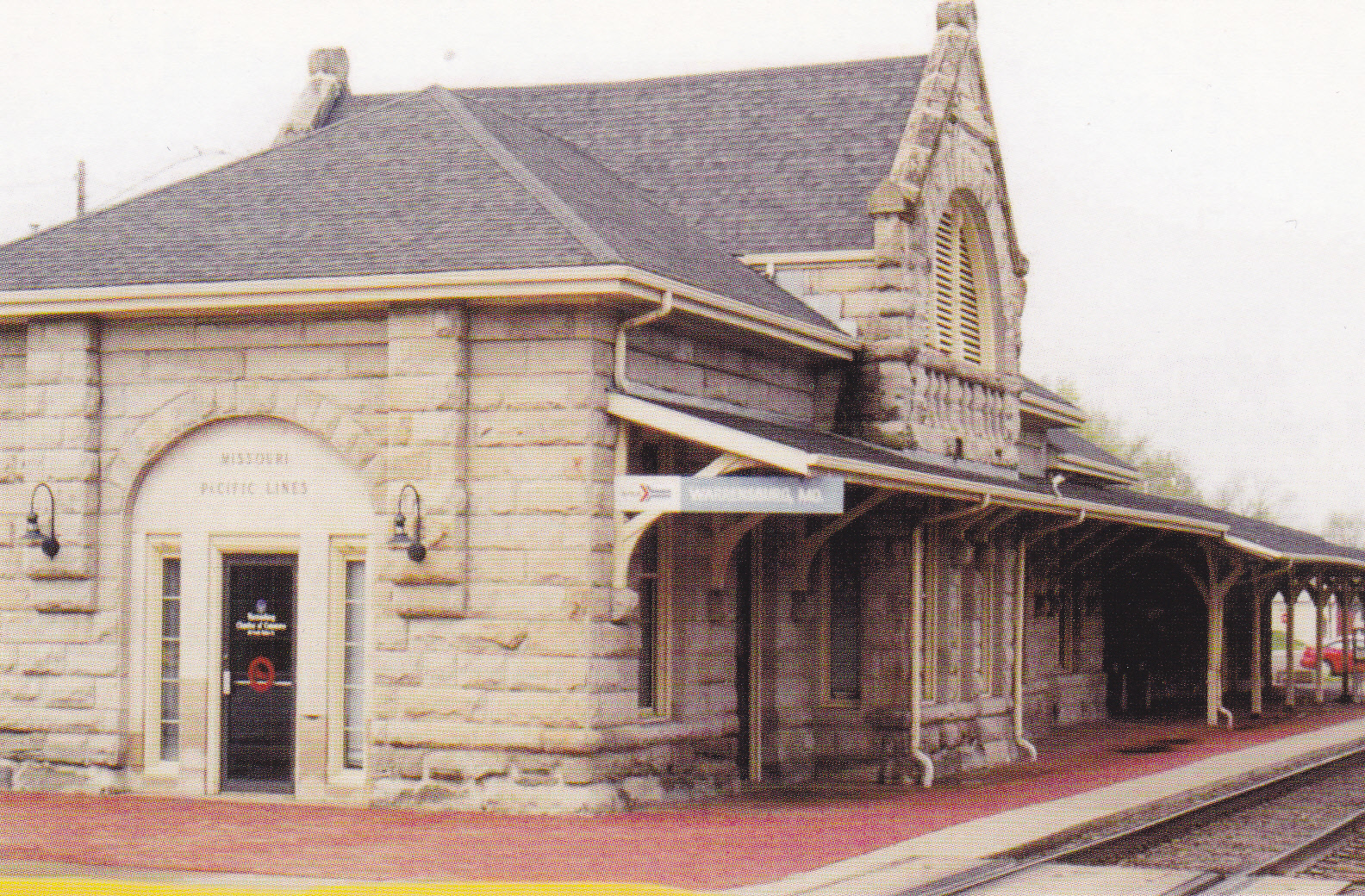
- Warrensburg, Missouri train depot

General information
- Location: 100 South Holden Street; Warrensburg, Missouri; United States
- Coordinates: 38.7628°N 93.7409°W
- Owner: City of Warrensburg
- Platforms: 1 side platform
- Tracks: 1

Construction
- Parking: minimal spaces in a public lot adjacent to the west side of the depot
- Cycle facilities: a bicycle rack outside the Chamber of Commerce entrance on the east side of the depot
- Accessible: Yes

Other information
- Station code: Amtrak: WAR

History
- Opened: 1890

Passengers
- FY 2025: 11,158 (Amtrak)

Services
Preceding station	Amtrak	Following station
Lee's Summit toward Kansas City	Missouri River Runner	Sedalia toward St. Louis
Former services
Preceding station	Amtrak	Following station
Kansas City Terminus	National Limited	Sedalia toward New York or Washington, D.C.
Preceding station	Missouri Pacific Railroad	Following station
Holden toward Kansas City	Main Line	Knob Noster toward St. Louis
Location

Warrensburg station is an Amtrak train station serving the city of Warrensburg, Missouri. The current station originally opened in 1890 by the Missouri Pacific Railroad, and is built out of sandstone in the Richardsonian Romanesque style. It has seen several remodels and enlargements the most recent major change being in 1984 when the baggage section and loading platform were added.

The station houses the Warrensburg Chamber of Commerce visitors center.

== Service ==
There are currently two trains daily to and from Kansas City, and two trains daily to and from St. Louis.

Other locations are available with connections at the Kansas City and St. Louis terminals. Service to Los Angeles can be obtained through a connection at Kansas City through the Southwest Chief. San Antonio service is available with a connection at St. Louis through the Texas Eagle. Connections to Chicago are available in Kansas City via Southwest Chief and St. Louis via Lincoln Service trains.

Amtrak completed a $2.6 million improvement project to the station in the early-2020s.

== See also ==
- List of Amtrak stations
- List of intercity bus stops in Missouri
