= James Cooney (Missouri politician) =

American politician

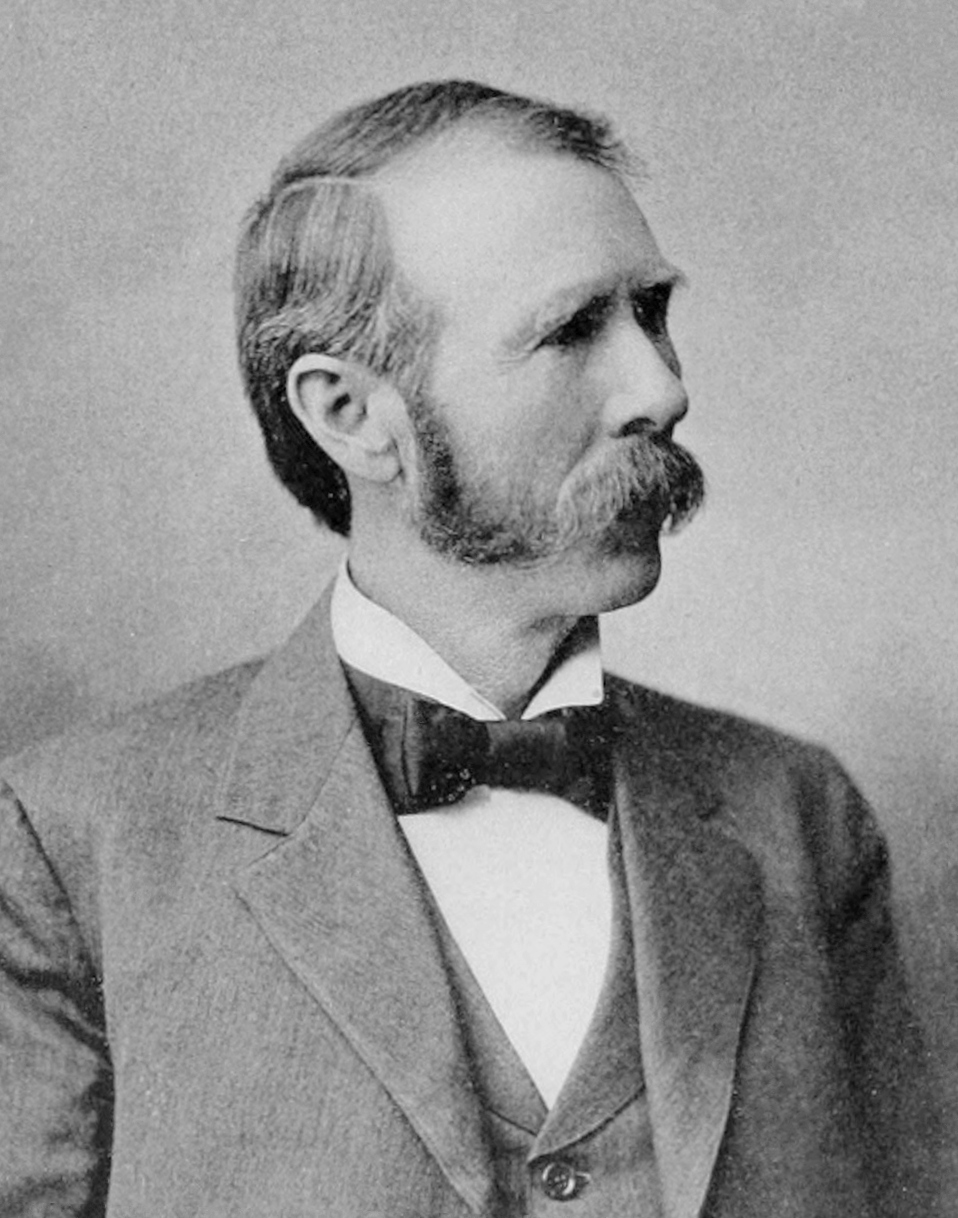

Member of the U.S. House of Representatives from Missouri's 7th district
- In office March 4, 1897 – March 3, 1903
- Preceded by: John P. Tracey
- Succeeded by: Courtney W. Hamlin

Personal details
- Born: July 28, 1848 County Limerick, Ireland
- Died: November 16, 1904 (aged 56) Marshall, Missouri, U.S.
- Party: Democratic
- Profession: lawyer

James Cooney (July 28, 1848 – November 16, 1904) was an American lawyer and Democratic politician from Marshall, Missouri. He represented Missouri's 7th congressional district in the U.S. House from 1897 until 1903.

== Biography ==
Cooney was born in County Limerick, Ireland on July 28, 1848. His parents moved their family to the United States in 1852, and settled in Troy, New York.

Cooney was educated in Troy, and at age 18 moved to Missouri, where he attended the public schools and the University of Missouri at Columbia. He then became a school teacher and principal, and worked in Illinois and Missouri for several years, including serving as principal of the high school in Sturgeon, Missouri.

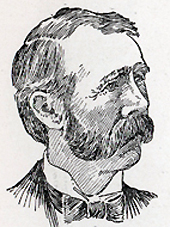
James Cooney, Missouri judge and legislator.

In 1875 Cooney settled in Marshall, Missouri. He studied law, was admitted to the bar, and established a practice. He was elected Saline County probate judge in 1880. In 1882 and 1884 he won election as the county's prosecuting attorney.

Cooney was elected as a Democrat to the Fifty-fifth, Fifty-sixth, and Fifty-seventh Congresses (March 4, 1897 – March 3, 1903). He was an unsuccessful candidate for renomination in 1902.

After leaving Congress, Cooney resumed the practice of law in Marshall. He died there on November 16, 1904, and was interred at Ridge Park Cemetery.

U.S. House of Representatives
Preceded by John P. Tracey	Member of the U.S. House of Representatives from Missouri's 7th congressional district 1897–1903	Succeeded by Courtney W. Hamlin
