= Sedalia station (Missouri, Kansas and Texas Railroad) =

- Missouri, Kansas and Texas Railroad Depot
- U.S. National Register of Historic Places
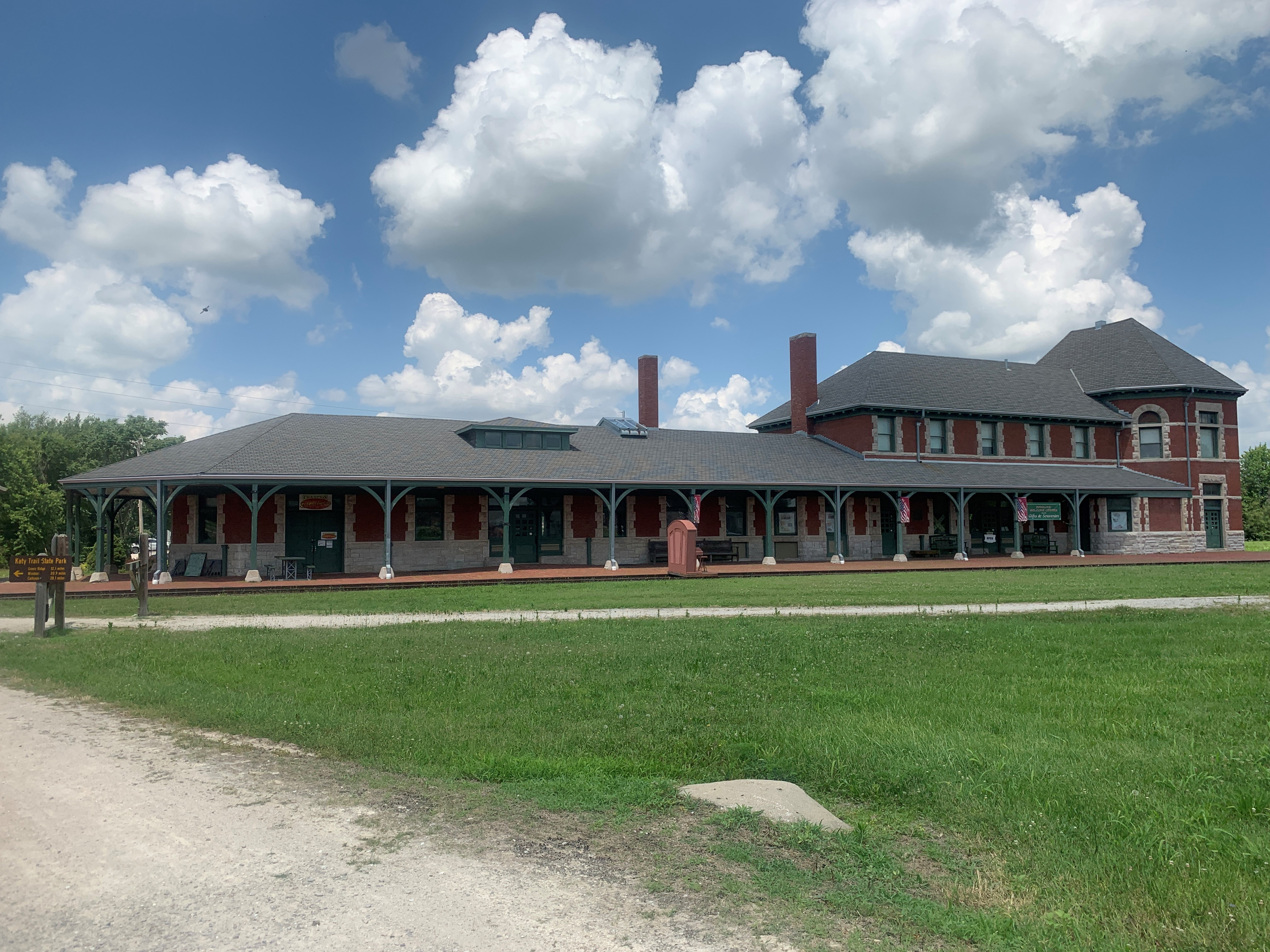
- Sedalia station in 2019

- Location within Missouri Location within the United States
- Location: 600 E. 3rd St., Sedalia, Missouri
- Coordinates: 38°42′28″N 93°13′14″W
- Area: 1 acre (0.40 ha)
- Built: 1895
- Architect: Gilbert, Bradford C.
- Architectural style: Romanesque Revival
- NRHP reference No.: 79001388
- Added to NRHP: March 28, 1979

Sedalia station, also known as the Katy Depot, is a historic train station located at Sedalia, Pettis County, Missouri, United States. It was built in 1895 by the Missouri, Kansas and Texas Railroad. Designed by New York architect Bradford Gilbert, the depot is a 2 1/2-story, Romanesque Revival style red brick building on a limestone foundation. It has a two-story, modified octagonal primary facade, slate-covered hip roofs, and a broad encircling gallery. The station closed to passenger traffic in May 1958. The building houses the Sedalia welcome center.

It was listed on the National Register of Historic Places in 1979 as the Missouri, Kansas and Texas Railroad Depot.

Preceding station	Missouri–Kansas–Texas Railroad	Following station
Bryson toward Galveston	Main Line	Pilot Grove toward St. Louis
Terminus	Sedalia – Hannibal	Pleasant Green toward Hannibal

== See also ==
- Sedalia station
