= John T. and Lillian Heard House =

Historic house in Missouri, United States

- U.S. National Register of Historic Places
- Location within Missouri Location within the United States
- Location: 200 W. Broadway Blvd., Sedalia, Missouri
- Coordinates: 38°42′15″N 93°13′46″W
- Area: less than one acre
- Built: 1906
- Built by: Dean Construction Co.
- Architectural style: Classical Revival
- NRHP reference No.: 11000187
- Added to NRHP: April 15, 2011

John T. and Lillian Heard House, also known as Heard Memorial Club House, is a historic home and clubhouse located at Sedalia, Pettis County, Missouri. It was built in 1906, and is a two-story, Classical Revival style buff brick dwelling on a raised basement. It has a hipped roof with dormers and a partial width porch with square brick and Classical wood columns. It was built as the residence of Senator and Mrs. John T. Heard, later given by Mrs. Heard in 1935 to the Sorosis Club and the Helen G. Steele Music Clubs.

It was listed on the National Register of Historic Places in 2011.
