= Missouri/Sedalia Trust Company =

- U.S. National Register of Historic Places
- U.S. Historic district – Contributing property
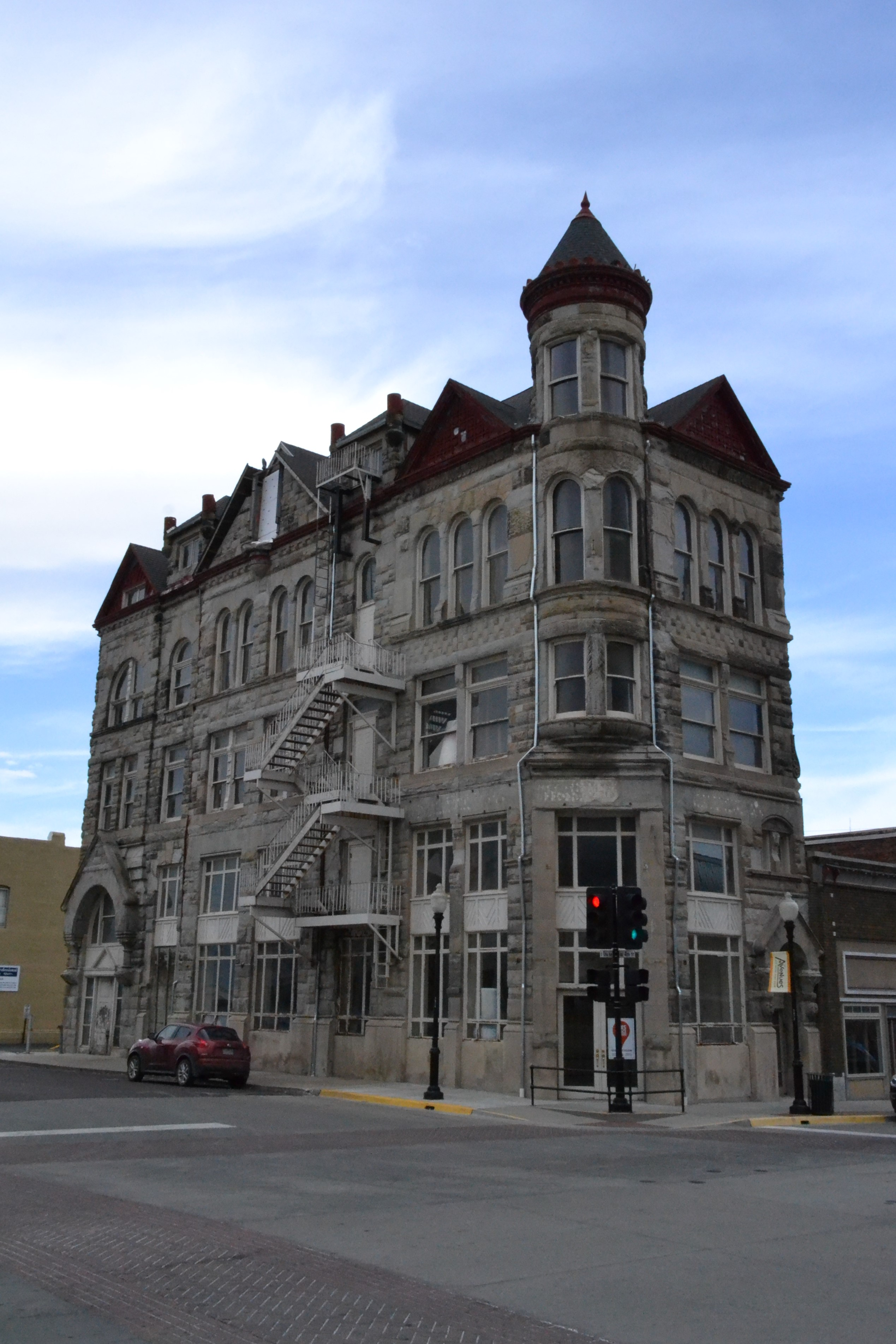

- Location within Missouri Location within the United States
- Location: 322 S. Ohio St., Sedalia, Missouri
- Coordinates: 38°42′28″N 93°13′41″W
- Area: less than one acre
- Built: 1887
- Architectural style: Renaissance, Romanesque
- NRHP reference No.: 83001034
- Added to NRHP: March 29, 1983

Missouri/Sedalia Trust Company, also known as the Koppen Trust Company, is a historic bank building located at Sedalia, Pettis County, Missouri. It was built in 1887, and is a four-story, rectangular Missouri limestone building with Renaissance Revival and Romanesque Revival style design elements. It features a multigable and towered roofline and heavily embellished wall surface.

It was listed on the National Register of Historic Places in 1983. It is located in the Sedalia Commercial Historic District.
