= Houstonia, Missouri =

City in Pettis County, Missouri, United States

- City
- Location of Houstonia, Missouri
- Coordinates: 38°53′58″N 93°21′34″W
- Country: United States
- State: Missouri
- County: Pettis
- Incorporated: 1879

Area
  - Total: 0.20 sq mi (0.51 km^{2})
  - Land: 0.20 sq mi (0.51 km^{2})
  - Water: 0 sq mi (0.00 km^{2})
- Elevation: 771 ft (235 m)

Population (2020)
  - Total: 198
  - Density: 1,001.3/sq mi (386.59/km^{2})
- Time zone: UTC-6 (Central (CST))
  - Summer (DST): UTC-5 (CDT)
- ZIP code: 65333
- Area code: 660
- FIPS code: 29-33256
- GNIS feature ID: 2394428

Houstonia is a city in northwest Pettis County, Missouri, United States. As of the 2020 census, Houstonia had a population of 198.

== History ==
Houstonia was platted in 1871. The community was named for Gen. Thomas F. Houston, an early settler. A post office called Houstonia has been in operation since 1872.

The Osage Farms Resettlement Properties in Pettis County, Missouri includes properties listed on the National Register of Historic Places in 1991.

== Geography ==
Houstonia is located at the intersection of Missouri routes K and OO approximately 2.5 miles south of the Pettis-Saline county line and 15 miles northwest of Sedalia. Buffalo Creek flows past the east side of the community.

According to the United States Census Bureau, the city has a total area of 0.20 square miles (0.52 km^{2}), all land.

== Demographics ==
Historical population
Census	Pop.	Note	%±
1890	278		—
1900	307		10.4%
1910	349		13.7%
1920	407		16.6%
1930	346		−15.0%
1940	326		−5.8%
1950	309		−5.2%
1960	261		−15.5%
1970	312		19.5%
1980	327		4.8%
1990	283		−13.5%
2000	275		−2.8%
2010	220		−20.0%
2020	198		−10.0%
U.S. Decennial Census

=== 2010 census ===
As of the census of 2010, there were 220 people, 82 households, and 57 families living in the city. The population density was 1,100.0 inhabitants per square mile (424.7/km^{2}). There were 95 housing units at an average density of 475.0 per square mile (183.4/km^{2}). The racial makeup of the city was 97.7% White, 0.5% African American, 0.5% Native American, 0.9% Asian, and 0.5% from two or more races. Hispanic or Latino of any race were 0.5% of the population.

There were 82 households, of which 34.1% had children under the age of 18 living with them, 56.1% were married couples living together, 8.5% had a female householder with no husband present, 4.9% had a male householder with no wife present, and 30.5% were non-families. 24.4% of all households were made up of individuals, and 9.8% had someone living alone who was 65 years of age or older. The average household size was 2.68 and the average family size was 3.18.

The median age in the city was 36.5 years. 23.2% of residents were under the age of 18; 11.8% were between the ages of 18 and 24; 28.2% were from 25 to 44; 23.1% were from 45 to 64; and 13.6% were 65 years of age or older. The gender makeup of the city was 51.4% male and 48.6% female.

=== 2000 census ===
As of the census of 2000, there were 275 people, 99 households, and 73 families living in the city. The population density was 1,395.8 inhabitants per square mile (538.9/km^{2}). There were 105 housing units at an average density of 532.9 per square mile (205.8/km^{2}). The racial makeup of the city was 97.09% White, 1.09% African American, 1.09% Asian, and 0.73% from two or more races. Hispanic or Latino of any race were 0.36% of the population.

There were 99 households, out of which 45.5% had children under the age of 18 living with them, 62.6% were married couples living together, 8.1% had a female householder with no husband present, and 25.3% were non-families. 22.2% of all households were made up of individuals, and 14.1% had someone living alone who was 65 years of age or older. The average household size was 2.78 and the average family size was 3.22.

In the city, the population was spread out, with 32.7% under the age of 18, 7.6% from 18 to 24, 28.4% from 25 to 44, 19.6% from 45 to 64, and 11.6% who were 65 years of age or older. The median age was 34 years. For every 100 females there were 106.8 males. For every 100 females age 18 and over, there were 103.3 males.

The median income for a household in the city was $34,219, and the median income for a family was $34,531. Males had a median income of $36,000 versus $18,500 for females. The per capita income for the city was $12,490. About 20.8% of families and 24.7% of the population were below the poverty line, including 24.7% of those under the age of eighteen and 16.7% of those 65 or over.

== See also ==
- List of cities in Missouri
