= Building at 217 West Main Street =

- U.S. National Register of Historic Places
- U.S. Historic district – Contributing property
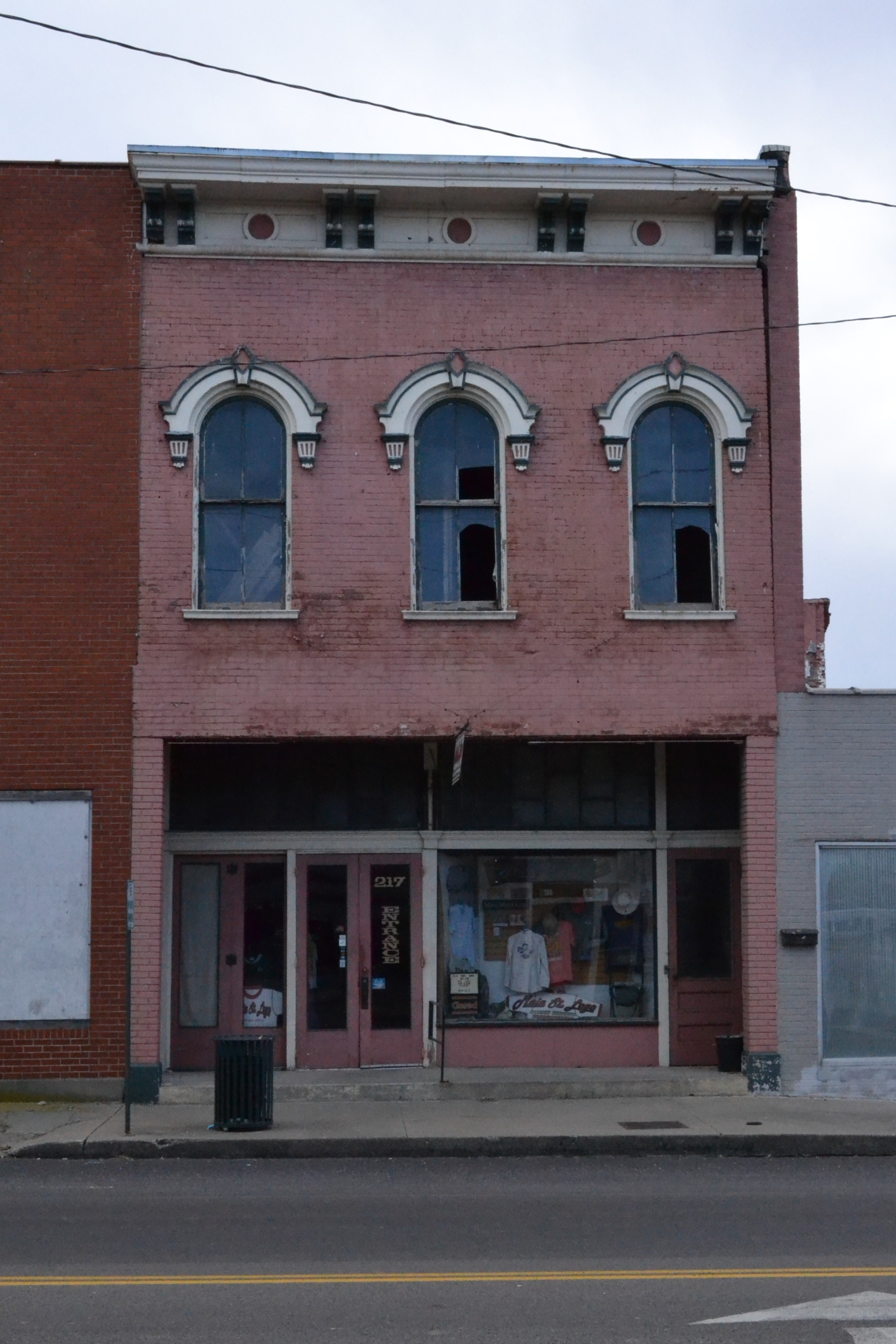

- Location within Missouri Location within the United States
- Location: 217 W. Main St., Sedalia, Missouri
- Coordinates: 38.710854°N 93.229403°W
- Area: less than one acre
- Built: 1874, 1906
- Architectural style: Italianate
- NRHP reference No.: 96001189
- Added to NRHP: October 24, 1996

Building at 217 West Main Street, also known as the Open Door Service Center Building, is a historic commercial building located at Sedalia, Pettis County, Missouri, US. It was built in 1874, and is a two-story, L-shaped, Italianate style brick building. A wing was added in 1906. It features a decorative metal cornice and three round arched windows. The building is known to have housed a brothel in the late-19th and early-20th centuries.

It was listed on the National Register of Historic Places in 1996. It is located in the Sedalia Commercial Historic District.
