= Henry Jones Farmstead =

- U.S. National Register of Historic Places
- Location within Missouri Location within the United States
- Location: 17000 Hwy. EE, near Sedalia, Missouri
- Coordinates: 38°49′44″N 93°10′01″W
- Area: 400 acres (160 ha)
- Built: 1868
- Built by: Jones, Henry; Barnhart, Robert
- Architectural style: Georgian, Italianate
- NRHP reference No.: 08001129
- Added to NRHP: December 3, 2008

Henry Jones Farmstead is a historic home and farm located near Sedalia, Pettis County, Missouri. The farmhouse was built in 1878, and is a two-story, Italianate style brick dwelling. It has a Georgian plan, a portico with balustraded deck, and low hipped roof topped by a widow's walk. Attached is a summer kitchen that was constructed in 1885. Also on the property are the contributing frame gable roof tenant cottage (c. 1892), a buggy house (c. 1890), and a transverse crib barn (1892).

It was listed on the National Register of Historic Places in 2008.
