= Hotel Bothwell =

- U.S. National Register of Historic Places
- U.S. Historic district – Contributing property
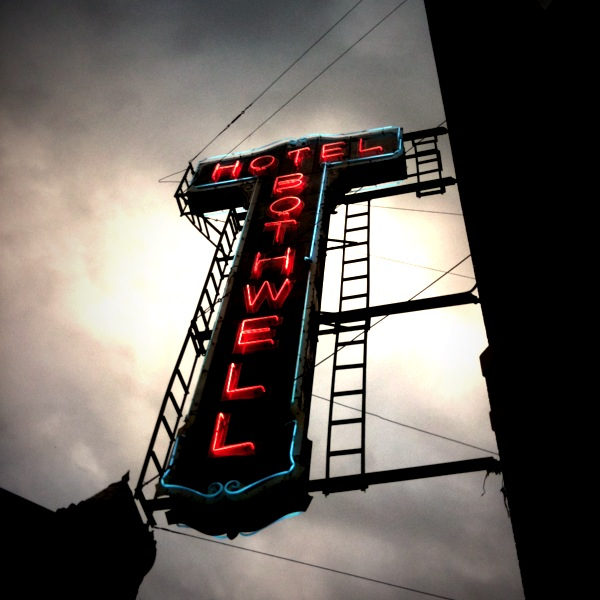
- Bothwell Hotel Neon Sign, October 2009

- Location within Missouri Location within the United States
- Location: 103 E. Fourth St., Sedalia, Missouri
- Coordinates: 38°42′29″N 93°13′39″W
- Area: less than one acre
- Built: 1927
- Architect: Stevens, H.L., Co.
- Architectural style: Classical Revival
- NRHP reference No.: 89001406
- Added to NRHP: September 8, 1989

Hotel Bothwell is a historic hotel building located at Sedalia, Pettis County, Missouri. It was designed by H.L. Stevens & Company and built in 1927. It is a seven-story, Classical Revival style reinforced concrete building faced with tan brick and stone trim. The basement, first, and second floors occupy the full rectangular parcel, whereas the upper stories have an L-shaped plan.

It was listed on the National Register of Historic Places in 1989. It is located in the Sedalia Commercial Historic District.

== History ==
The Hotel Bothwell was opened June 10, 1927 by John H. Bothwell. The hotel cost $400,000 to build and originally had 109 rooms, the modern hotel has 53 expanded rooms. The hotel has had a number of prominent guests including Harry S. Truman who was in the hotel in 1934 when he learned that he had been selected to run for US Senate. Actors Clint Eastwood and Eric Fleming promoted the TV series Rawhide at the hotel in 1959.

The hotel was converted to a senior living facility in 1988 known as the Kensington Bothwell.

In 1998, a former Hotel Bothwell bell boy, Doyle Furnell bought and restored the hotel. The hotel joined the Clarion Collection of hotels in 2004.
