= Gen. David Thomson House =

Historic house in Missouri, United States

- U.S. National Register of Historic Places
- Location within Missouri Location within the United States
- Location: S of Hughesville on SR H, near Hughesville, Missouri
- Coordinates: 38°46′52″N 93°16′20″W
- Area: less than one acre
- Built: 1840
- Architect: Multiple
- Architectural style: Federal
- NRHP reference No.: 82000588
- Added to NRHP: October 4, 1982

Gen. David Thomson House, also known as Elm Spring, is a historic home located near Hughesville, Pettis County, Missouri. It was built in 1840, and is a two-story, five-bay, Federal style brick I-house. It has a central passage plan and one-story rear ell. Its builder, Gen. David Thomson, previously built Longview near Georgetown, Kentucky about 1819.

It was listed on the National Register of Historic Places in 1982.
