= McVey School =

- U.S. National Register of Historic Places
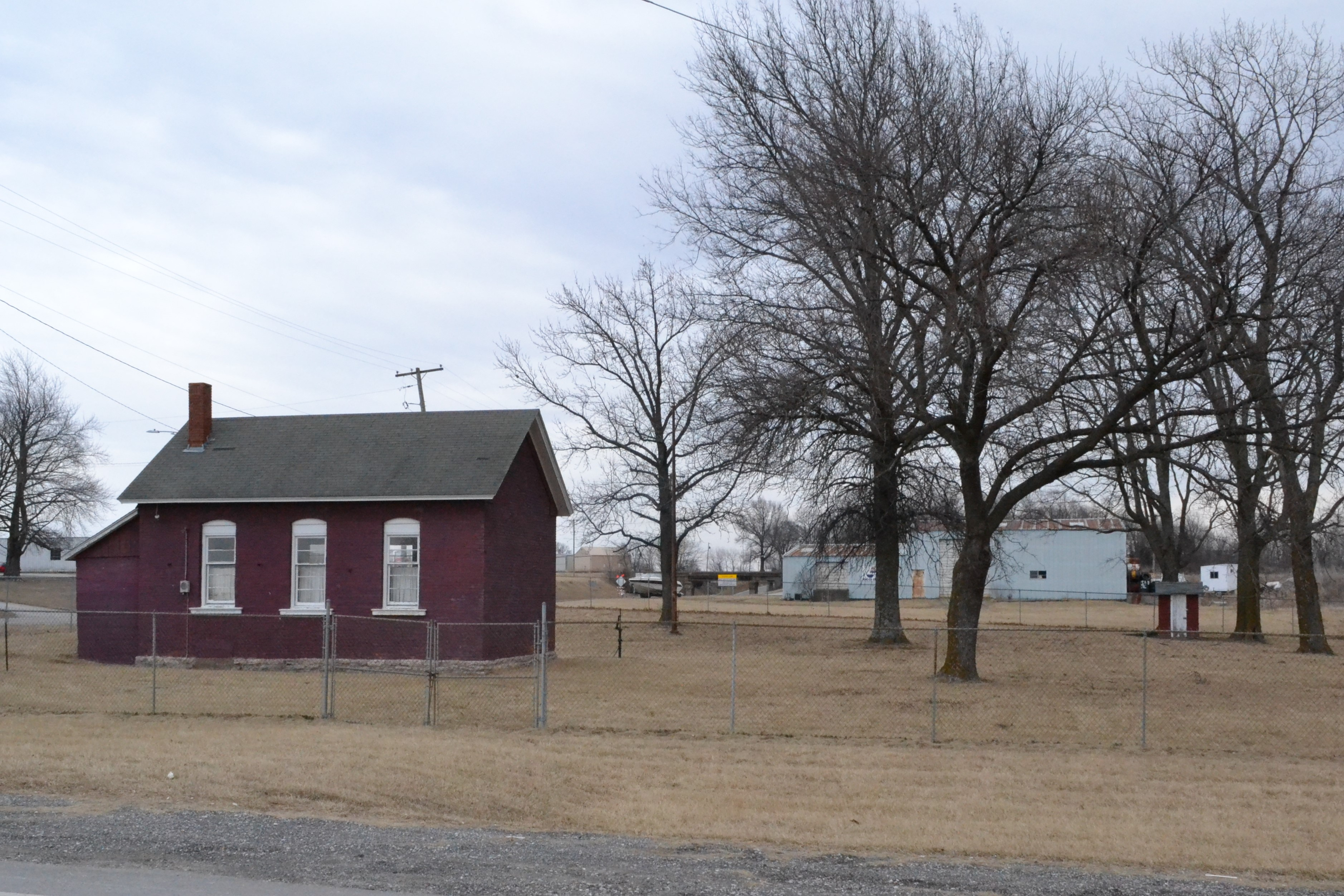

- Location within Missouri Location within the United States
- Location: Jct. of MO 50 and Rte M, Sedalia, Missouri
- Coordinates: 38°41′59″N 93°11′23″W
- Area: less than one acre
- Built: 1886
- Architect: Cousley, William
- Architectural style: One-room schoolhouse
- NRHP reference No.: 99001255
- Added to NRHP: October 14, 1999

McVey School, also known as the Little Red Schoolhouse, is a historic one-room school located at Sedalia, Pettis County, Missouri. It was built in 1886, and is a one-story, brick building measuring 19 feet by 29 feet. Also on the property is a contributing privy. The school closed in 1956 and opened as a museum maintained by the Pettis County Historical Society in 1966.

It was listed on the National Register of Historic Places in 1999.
