= Osage Farms Resettlement Properties in Pettis County, Missouri =

- U.S. National Register of Historic Places
- Location within Missouri Location within the United States
- Nearest city: Houstonia, Missouri and Hughesville, Missouri
- Coordinates: 38°52′17″N 93°20′43″W
- Built: 1937
- Built by: Resettlement Administration; Farm Security Administration
- Architectural style: Resettlement Administration
- MPS: Osage Farms Resettlement Properties in Pettis County MPS
- NRHP reference No.: 91001399 through 91001410
- Added to NRHP: September 27, 1991

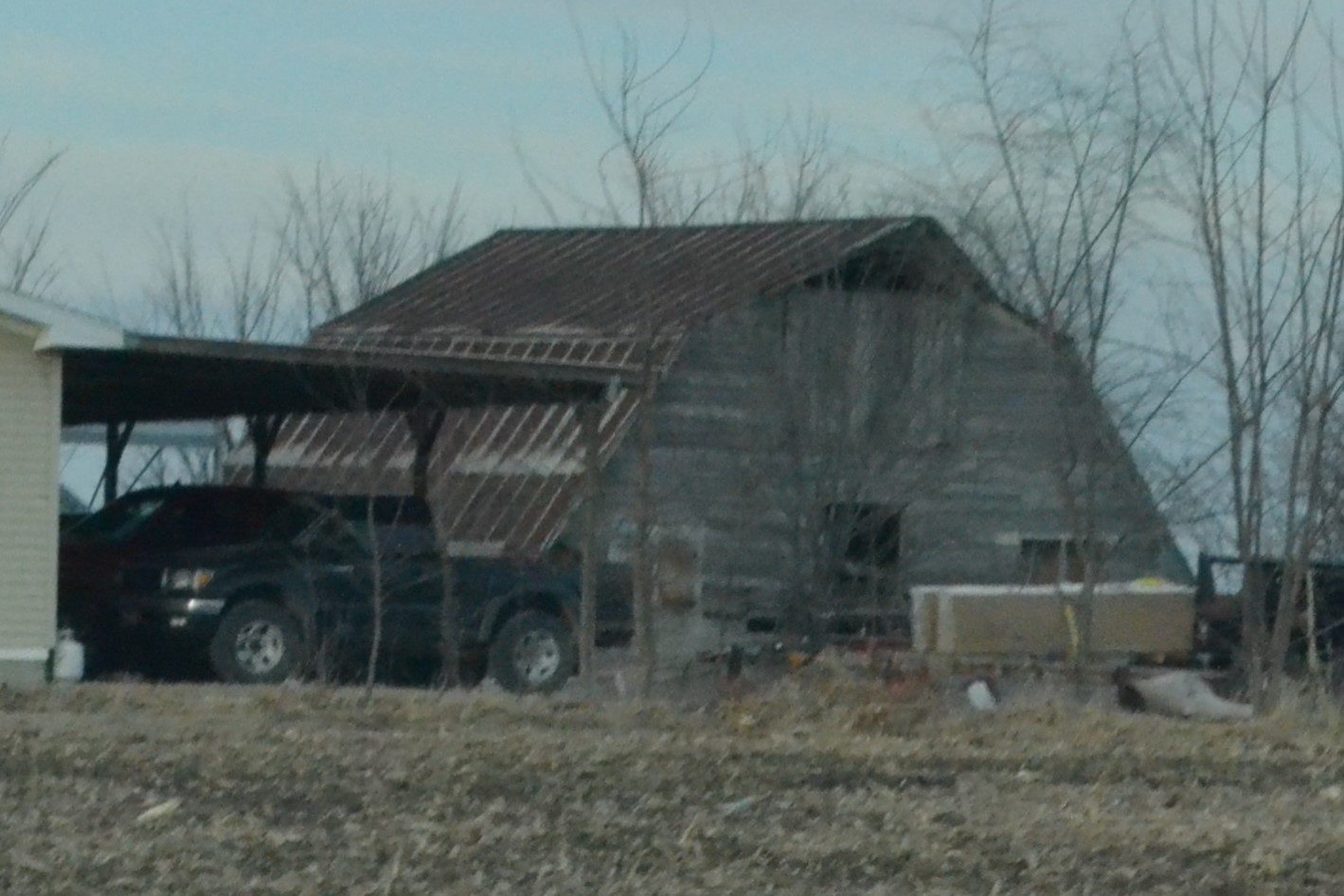
Osage Farms Unit No. 30 Historic District barn. Only remaining portion of Unit 30

The Osage Farms Resettlement Properties in Pettis County, Missouri is a National Register of Historic Places multiple property submission located at Pettis County, Missouri. The submission includes 10 national historic districts and 2 individual properties listed on the National Register of Historic Places. The properties included were built by the Resettlement Administration / Farm Security Administration in 1937 as model farms and known as Osage Farms. Model farmsteads typically included a 1 1/2-story frame dwelling, barn, poultry house and privy.

The following were listed on the National Register of Historic Places in 1991.

- Bois d'Arc Cooperative Dairy Farm Historic District (NRHP 91001407): The six contributing buildings are a large dairy barn with a milking wing, a horse and bull barn, three farmhouses and a food storage building. It served as the nucleus of a 2,000 acre cooperative dairy operation from 1937 to 1943.
- Hillview Cooperative Dairy Farm Historic District (NRHP 91001399): The seven contributing buildings and three contributing structures are a large dairy barn with a milking wing, two silos, two poultry houses, a granary, a reconditioned horse barn, two dwellings, and a well house. It encompasses the nucleus of two experimental cooperative farms.
- Osage Farms Type 315:13 Government Farmhouse (NRHP 91001406): It is a 1 1/2-story frame farmhouse with a gambrel roof of type 315:13. It was moved to its present location about 1959.
- Osage Farms Unit No. 1 Historic District (NRHP 91001408): The four contributing buildings are the farmhouse, barn, a poultry house, and food storage building. It was the prototypical individual government farmstead constructed at Osage Farms.
- Osage Farms Unit No. 25 Historic District (NRHP 91001405): The four contributing buildings are the farmhouse, barn, a poultry house, and food storage building. It was one of a contiguous grouping of five individual farmsteads along Houston and High Point Roads.
- Osage Farms Unit No. 26 Historic District (NRHP 91001409): The four contributing buildings are the farmhouse, barn, a poultry house, and food storage building. It was part of a grouping of several more or less contiguous individual government farmsteads near the center of the Osage Farms project area.
- Osage Farms Unit No. 30 Historic District (NRHP 91001401): The three contributing buildings are the barn, a privy, and food storage building. The government privy is perhaps the only intact example of its type extant in the Osage Farms project area.
- Osage Farms Unit No. 31 (NRHP 91001402): The property includes a wood frame, central passage government barn. The barn is typical of those built on nearly all individual government farmsteads at Osage Farms.
- Osage Farms Unit No. 41 (NRHP 91001403): The property includes a frame and cinder block side-passage government barn. It was the only Type 411:5 barn erected at Osage Farms.
- Osage Farms Unit No. 43 Historic District (NRHP 91001410): The four contributing buildings are the farmhouse, two poultry houses, and a food storage building. It was part of an individual government farmstead in the Osage Farms resettlement community.
- Osage Farms Units No. 5 and No. 6 Historic District (NRHP 91001404): The four contributing buildings are the farmhouse, two barns, and a food storage building. The buildings are on what had been two contiguous individual farmsteads in the Osage Farms resettlement community. All building have been demolished.
- Osage Farms Units No. 8 and No. 9 Historic District (NRHP 91001400): The six contributing buildings are the farmhouse, two barns, two poultry houses, and a food storage building. The buildings are on what had been two contiguous individual farmsteads in the Osage Farms resettlement community.
