= Sedalia Public Library =

- U.S. National Register of Historic Places
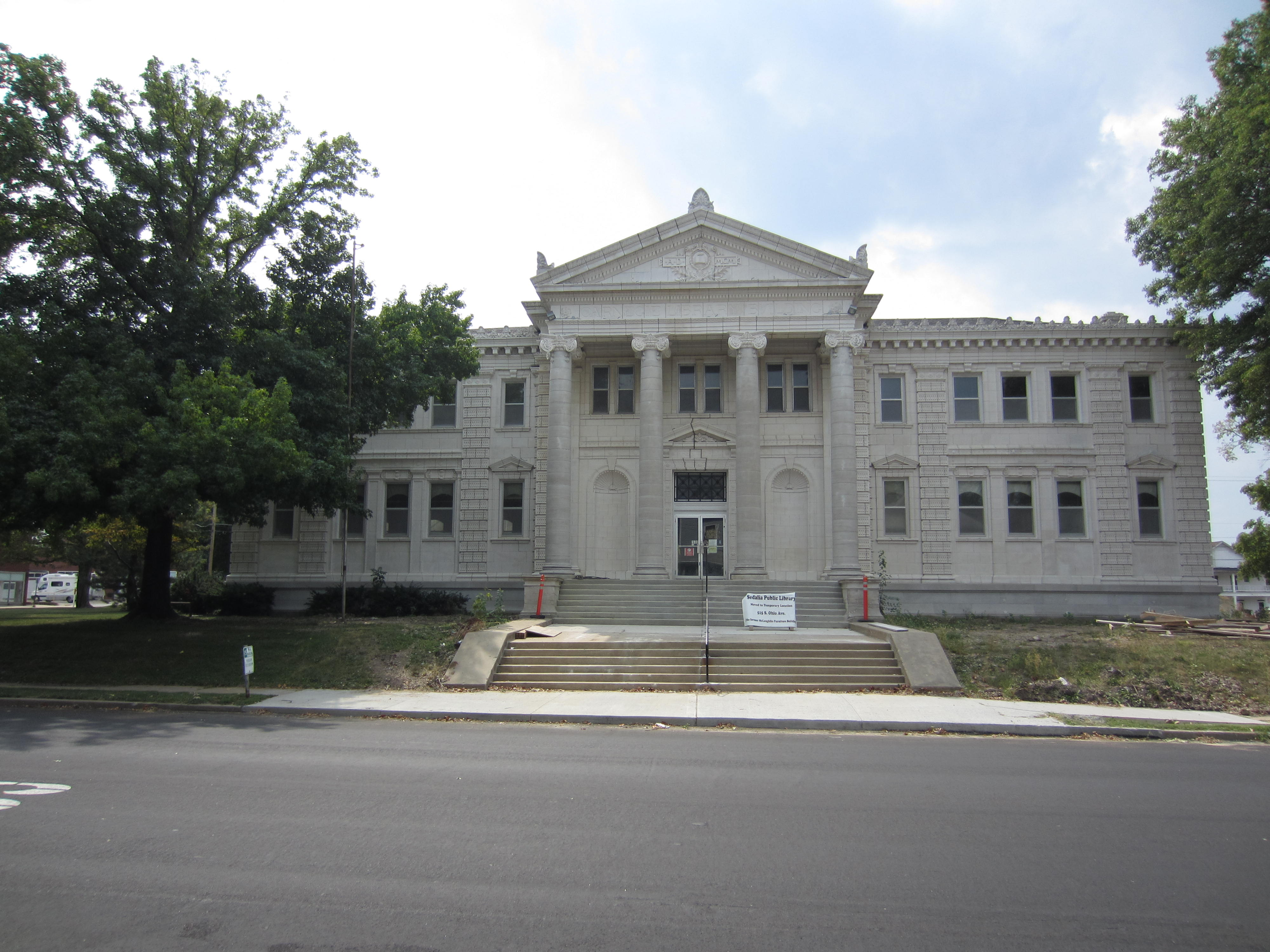
- Sedalia Public Library, September 2013

- Location within Missouri Location within the United States
- Location: 311 W. 3rd St., Sedalia, Missouri
- Coordinates: 38°42′30″N 93°13′50″W
- Area: less than one acre
- Built: 1900
- Architect: Shepley, Rutan & Coolidge; Maurus, Russel & Garden
- Architectural style: Greek Revival
- NRHP reference No.: 80002389
- Added to NRHP: January 10, 1980

Sedalia Public Library is a historic Carnegie library building located at Sedalia, Pettis County, Missouri. It was designed by the architecture firm Shepley, Rutan and Coolidge and built in 1900. It is a two-story, cruciform plan, Greek Revival style wood and steel frame building with brick walls and limestone and terra cotta facing. It is seven bays wide with an open tetrastyle Ionic order portico on the front facade. It was the first public library in the state of Missouri to receive a Carnegie grant for construction of a library building. The grant was $50,000.

It was listed on the National Register of Historic Places in 1980. The Sedalia Public Library continues operation after over 100 years in the same historic facility; modern amenities include computers and public fax machines.
