= Sedalia Commercial Historic District =

Historic district in Missouri, United States

- U.S. National Register of Historic Places
- U.S. Historic district
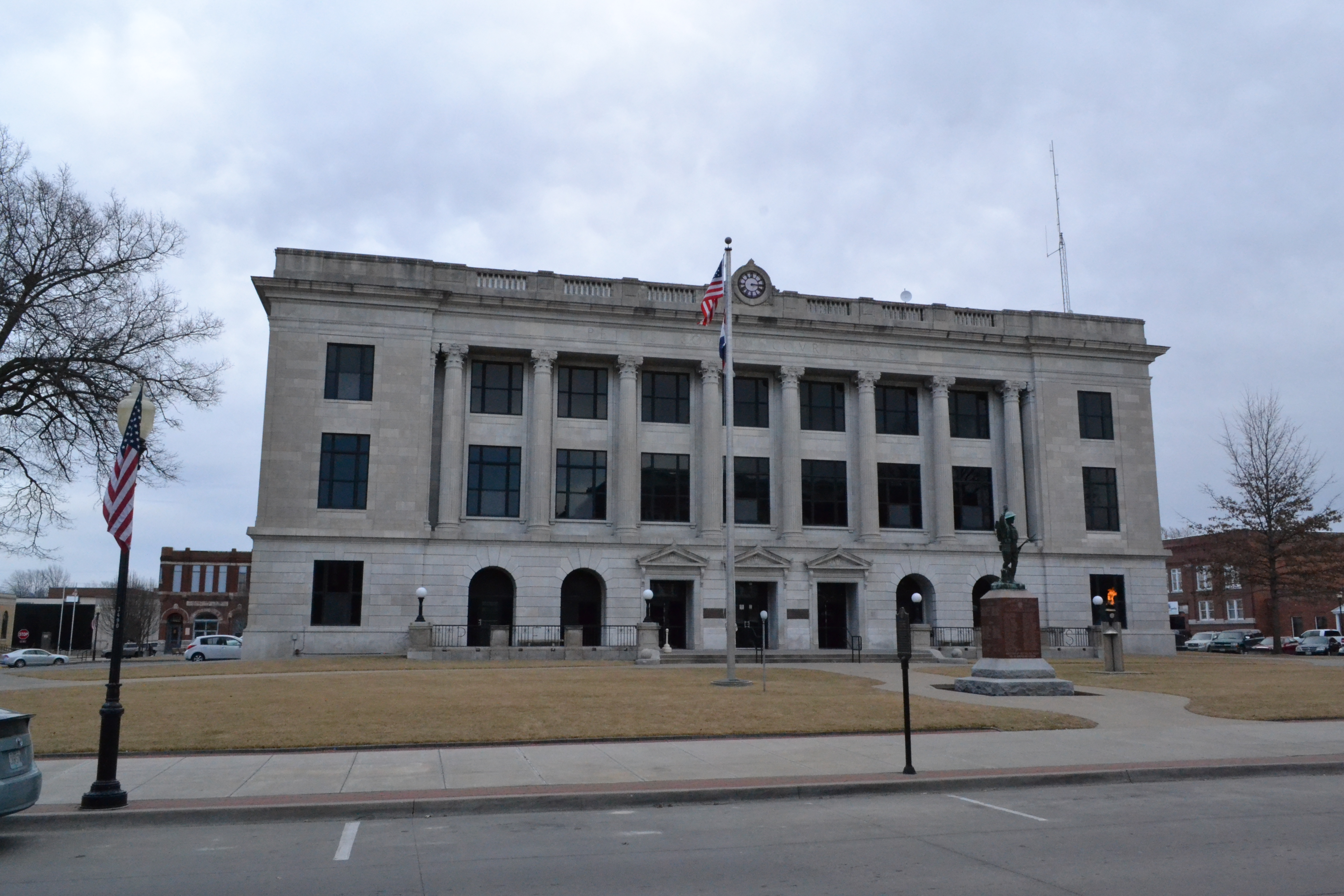
- Pettis County Courthouse

- Location within Missouri Location within the United States
- Location: Roughly Ohio, Lamine, W. Main, E. Main, and parts of 2nd through 5th Sts.; also 700-712 S. Ohio, 200 S. Moniteau, 101-108 W. Pacific, 104-220 W. Main, 208-400 W. 2nd, 200 W. 4th, and 102-120 E. 5th., Sedalia, Missouri
- Coordinates: 38°42′26″N 93°13′41″W
- Area: 31.5 acres (12.7 ha)
- Architectural style: Romanesque, Italianate, Art Deco, et al.
- NRHP reference No.: 01000687, 10000277 (Boundary Increase)
- Added to NRHP: June 28, 2001, May 21, 2010 (Boundary Increase)

The Sedalia Commercial Historic District is a national historic district located at Sedalia, Pettis County, Missouri. It encompasses 102 contributing buildings in the central business district of Sedalia. The district developed between about 1870 and 1959, and includes representative examples of Italianate, Romanesque Revival, and Art Deco architecture. Located in the district are the separately listed Hotel Bothwell, Building at 217 West Main Street, and Missouri/Sedalia Trust Company. Other notable buildings include the First United Methodist Church (1888–1891), Pettis County Courthouse (1924), Anheuser Busch Bottling Works (c. 1883, 1892), the New Lona Theater (1920), Citizens National Bank Building (c. 1908), Third National Bank (1929), Federal Building (1930), Montgomery Ward Building (1936), the Uptown Theatre (1936), Missouri Pacific Depot (c. 1952), and Central Presbyterian Church (New Creation Bible Church, c. 1910).

It was listed on the National Register of Historic Places in 2001, with a boundary increase in 2010 and amendment in 2016.
