= Sedalia, Missouri =

- City
- City of Sedalia
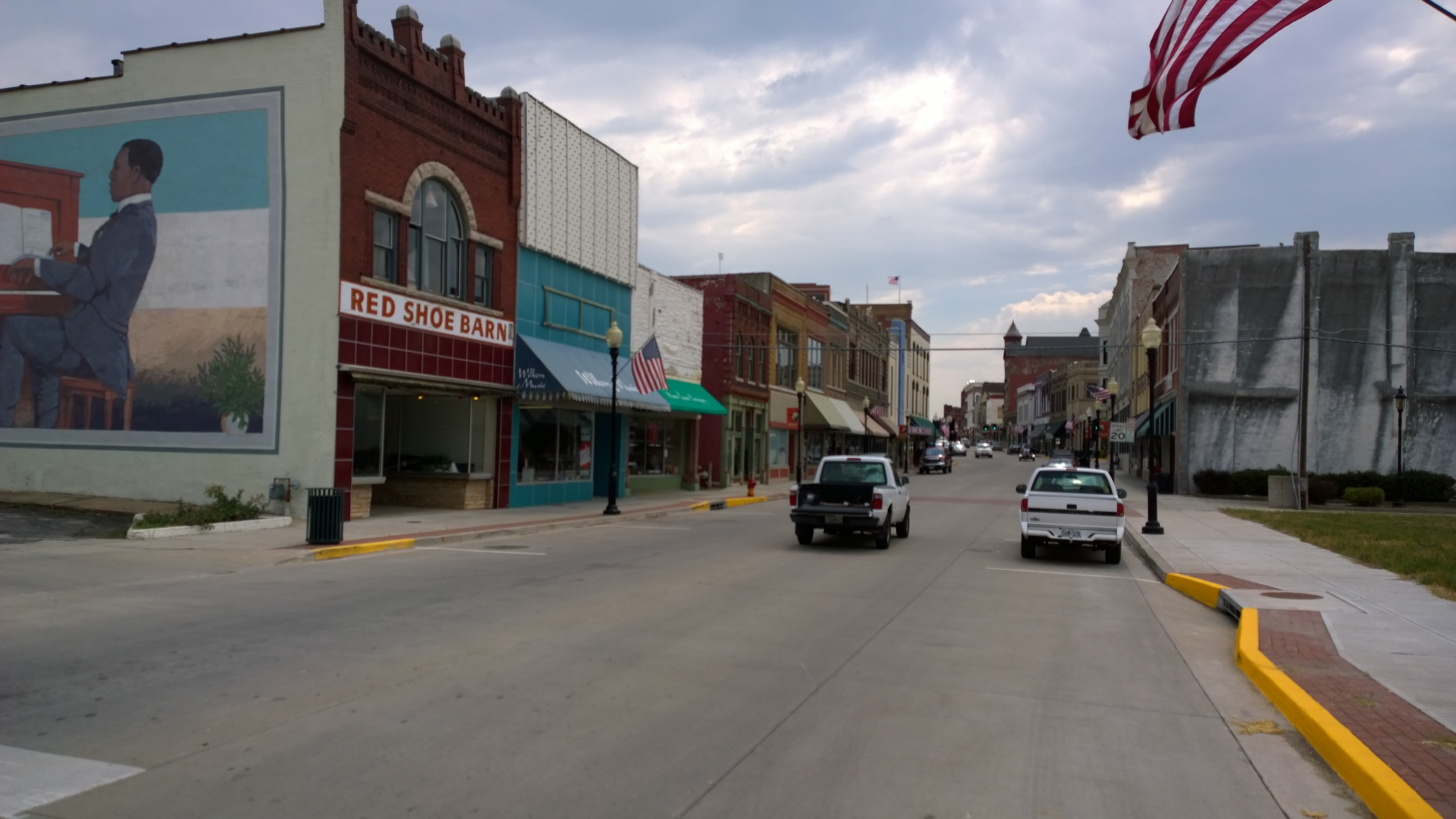
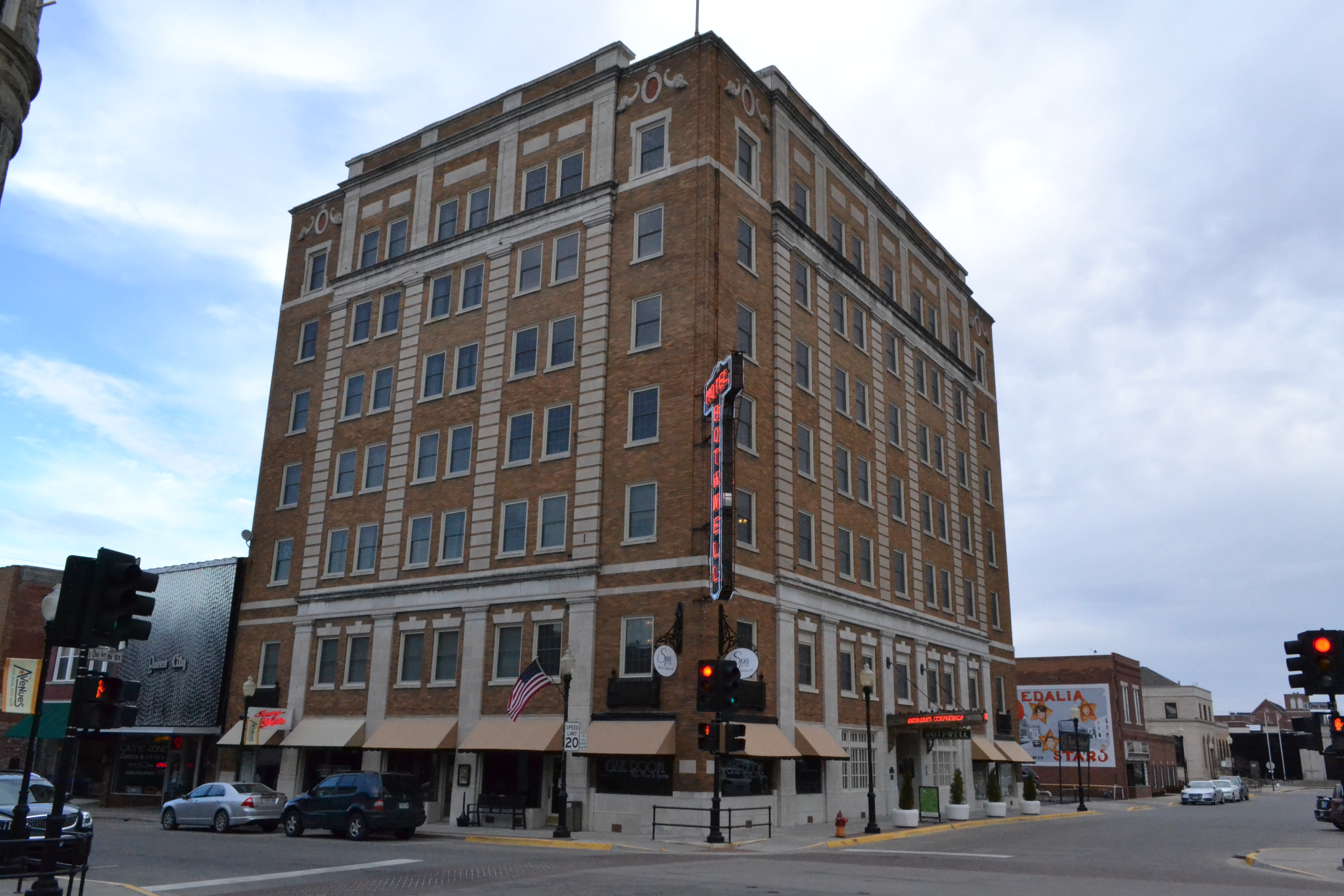
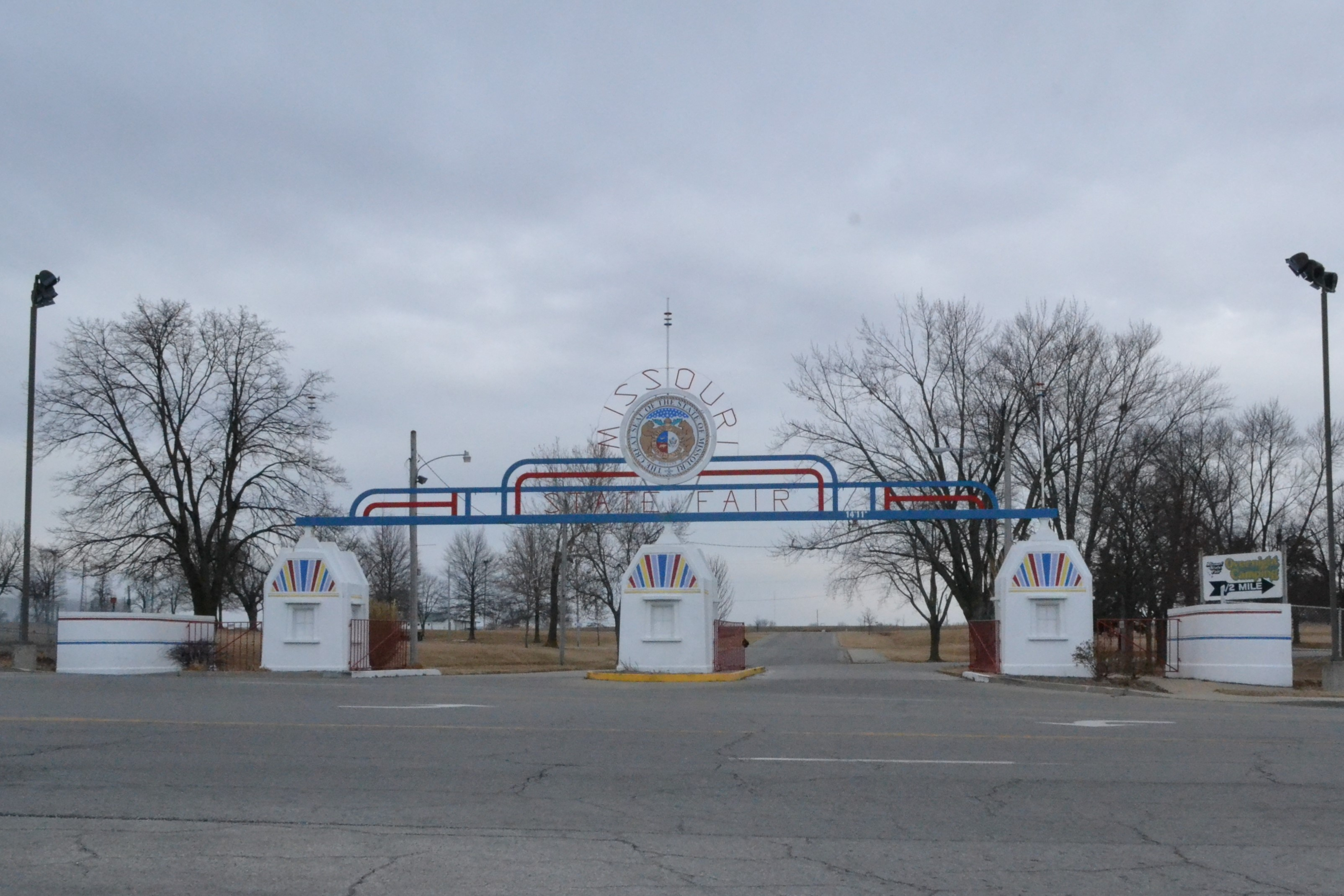
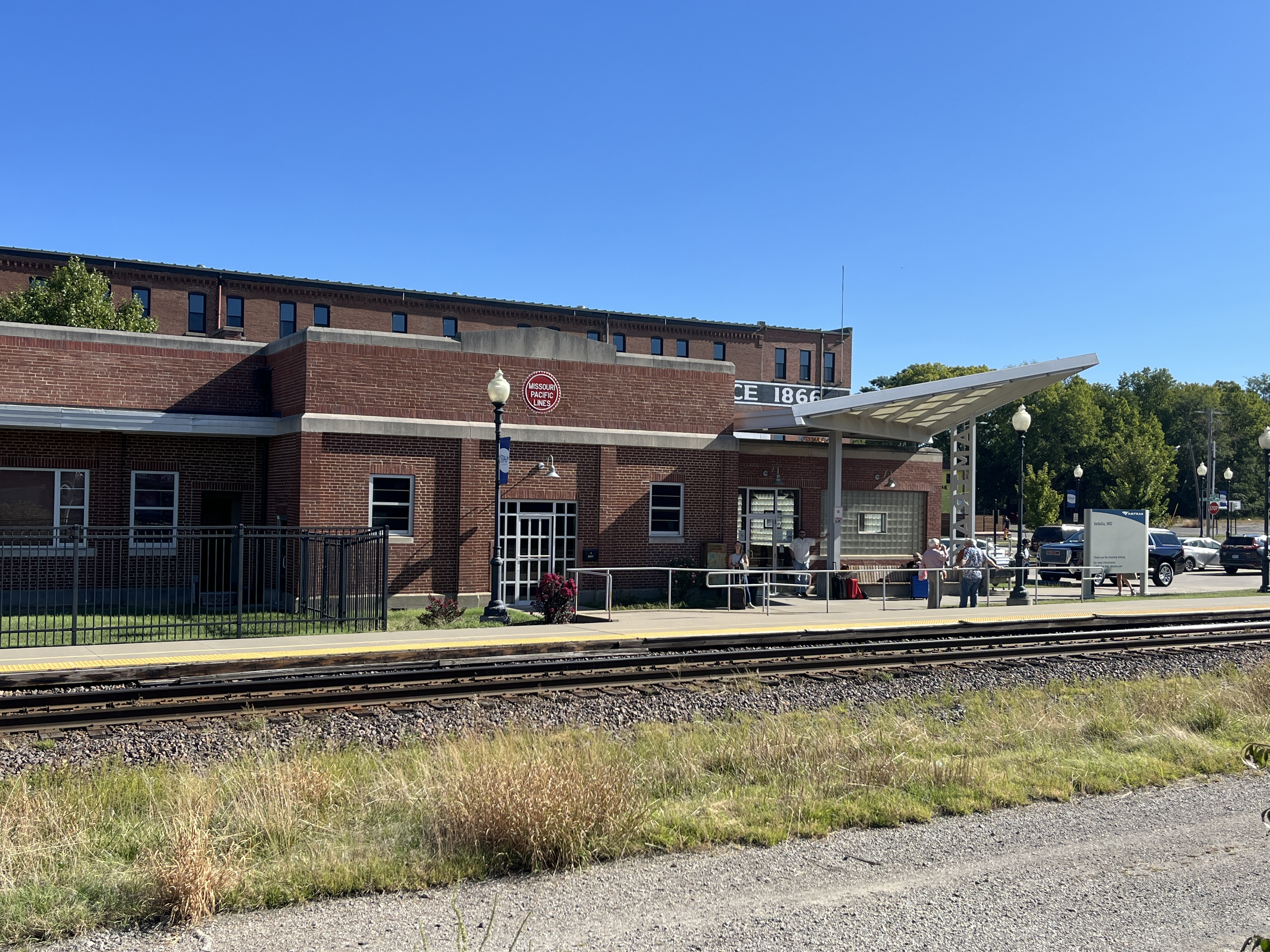
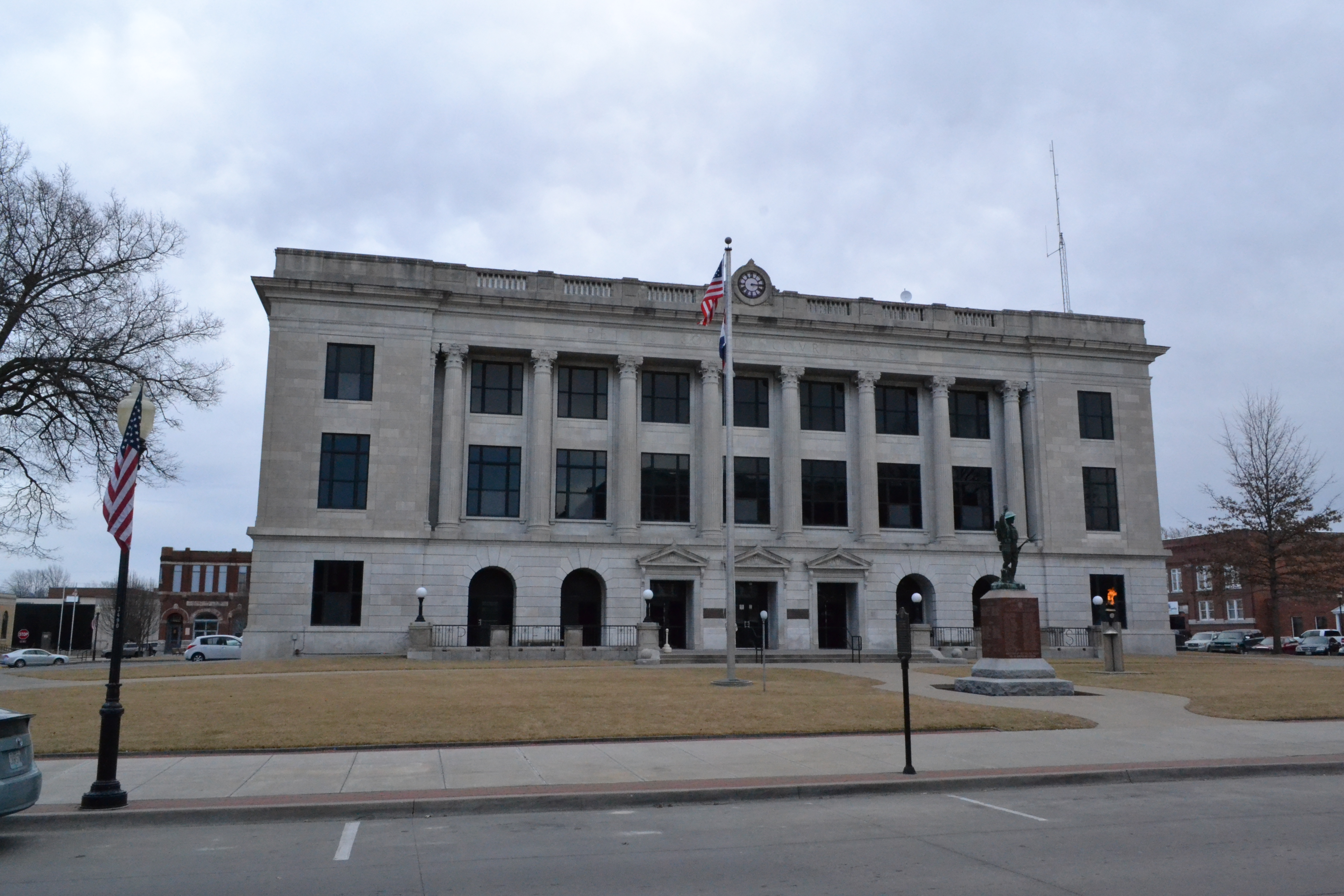
- Downtown Sedalia Hotel Bothwell Missouri State Fairgrounds Sedalia Station Pettis County Courthouse
- Nickname: Queen City of the Prairie
- Location of Sedalia, Missouri
- Coordinates: 38°42′13″N 93°15′51″W
- Country: United States
- State: Missouri
- County: Pettis
- Founded: 1857

Government
  - Mayor: Traves Williams
  - City Administrator: Matthew Wirt

Area
  - Total: 14.32 sq mi (37.09 km^{2})
  - Land: 14.29 sq mi (37.00 km^{2})
  - Water: 0.035 sq mi (0.09 km^{2})
- Elevation: 899 ft (274 m)

Population (2020)
  - Total: 21,725
  - Estimate (2023): 22,086
  - Density: 1,520.7/sq mi (587.16/km^{2})
- Demonym: Sedalian
- Time zone: UTC-6 (Central (CST))
  - Summer (DST): UTC-5 (CDT)
- ZIP codes: 65301-65302
- Area code: 660
- FIPS code: 29-66440
- GNIS feature ID: 2396567
- Website: www.sedalia.com

Sedalia is a city in central Missouri, US, located approximately 30 miles (50 kilometers) south of the Missouri River. It is the county seat of Pettis County, Missouri, United States, and the principal city of the Sedalia Micropolitan Statistical Area. As of the 2020 census, the city had a total population of 21,725. Sedalia is also the location of the Missouri State Fair and the Scott Joplin International Ragtime Festival. U.S. Routes 50 and 65 intersect in the city.

== History ==
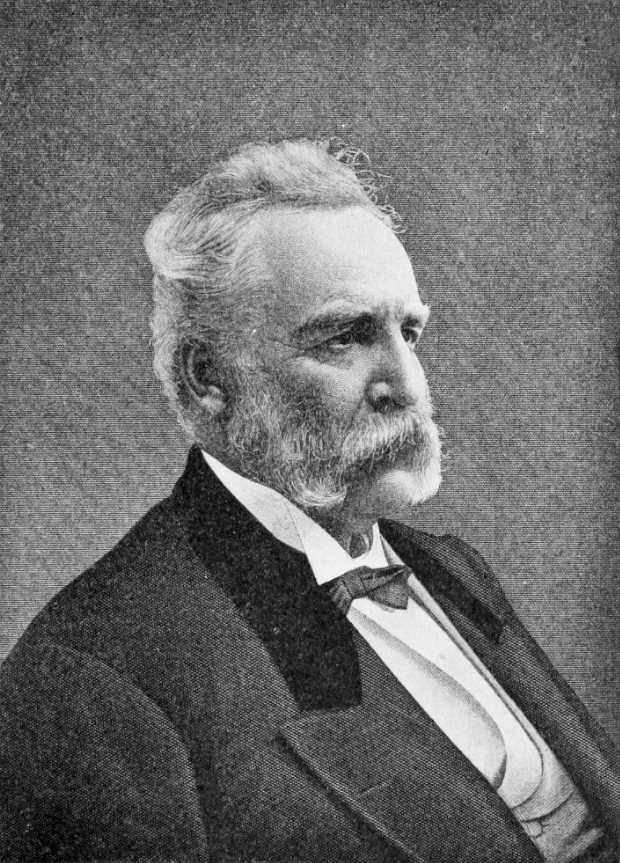
George Rappeen Smith

Native American Indian tribes lived along the Missouri River and its tributaries for thousands of years before European contact. Historians believe the entire area around Sedalia was long occupied by the Osage people. When the land was first settled by European Americans, bands of Shawnee, who had been driven west from east of the Mississippi River, lived in the vicinity of Sedalia.

The area that became Sedalia was founded by General George Rappeen Smith (1804–1879), who also founded nearby Smithton, Missouri. He filed plans for the official record on November 30, 1857, and gave the area the name Sedville. The original plat included the land from today's Missouri Pacific Railroad south to Third Street.

The version jointly filed by General Smith and David W. Bouldin on October 16, 1860, displayed the city extending from Clay Street to the north and to Smith Street (today's Third Street) in the south, and from Missouri Street in the west to Washington Street in the east; and, although Smith and Bouldin predicted that the city would grow to the north, it grew in a southern direction.

According to local lore, the town council changed the name from Sedville to Sedalia upon the 1860 filing in part because "towns that end in -ville don't amount to anything." (Lawrence Ditton Sr.). Another account holds:

In 1856 General Smith bought the land upon which Sedalia now stands, and founded the city. He named it after his daughter Sarah, familiarly known as "Sed". Smith remarked that he had previously named a flatboat for her elder sister Martha. He first chose the name Sedville but changed it to Sedalia, following the suggestion of a friend, Josiah Dent, of St. Louis. Dent suggested the change for the sake of euphony.

=== Railhead ===
Following a victory for those proposing the "ridge route" for the railway over those advocating the "river route", the railway reached Sedalia in January 1861. Prosperity followed, with many jobs associated with men maintaining tracks and operating large and varied machine shops run by both the Missouri Pacific and the Missouri-Kansas-Texas Railroad lines. The Missouri-Kansas & Texas Railroad was widely known as the "KATY", from its "K-T" stock exchange code.

Sedalia was an important railhead for the massive Texas cattle drive of 1866. It maintained stockyards to receive cattle from drives and shipping through much of the 19th century.

Chicago slaughterhouses were willing to pay almost any price [for beef]—longhorns were worth three to four dollars each on the Llano Estacado while in Chicago a steer was worth ten times that amount. It cost about a dollar per head to drive a herd northward to a railroad, and thus with these simple economics, the long drive and the cattle bonanza got its start.

During the spring and summer of 1866, some 260,000 head followed the trail to Sedalia, Missouri, the terminus of the Missouri Pacific Railroad." (McComb, 1989, p.84).

For nearly a century, Sedalia's economy was tied to the railroads. By the end of the 19th century, the MK&T had numerous buildings and a wide variety of workers in the city: the MK&T shops, stockyards, roundhouse, and the hospital for employees working in the Sedalia Division were among the Katy's properties in Sedalia.

After the KATY reduced its operations in the 20th century, its railroad right-of-way through much of Missouri was converted to a 240-mile multi-use trail. The KATY Trail is used by bikers, walkers and horseback riders. This has been the largest new trail developed in the nation among the late 20th-century federal and state "Rails to Trails" projects.

=== Civil War ===
During the Civil War, the U.S. Army had a small garrison in the area, adding to its boomtown atmosphere of accelerated development as merchants and traders attracted to the military business came to the area. In the postbellum period, two railroads were constructed connecting it to other locations, and Sedalia grew at a rapid pace, with the rough energy of travelers and cowboys. From 1866 to 1874, it was a railhead terminus for cattle drives, and stockyards occupied a large area. At the same time, the town established schools (racially segregated for white and black children), churches, and other civic amenities.

Sedalia was made a military post early in the war and remained such until its close in 1865. For this reason it was an active theater of operations for military supplies and an objective point for capture by "the boys in gray." Confederate raids into Pettis County, and the offensive and defensive activities of Union troops against them, kept the inhabitants of Sedalia in [a] high state of excitement. The progress of the city was retarded [during that time]. Sentiment in the county was about evenly divided.

On October 15, 1864, Shelby's Confederate cavalry brigade surrounded the Union post of Sedalia. The post commander, Colonel John D. Crawford, fled. Captain Oscar B. Queen of Company M, 7th Cavalry, Missouri State Militia, surrendered the post shortly thereafter. Missouri State Guard Brigadier-General M. Jeff Thompson subsequently paroled the prisoners of war and moved on, leaving Sedalia to itself.

=== Late 19th century ===
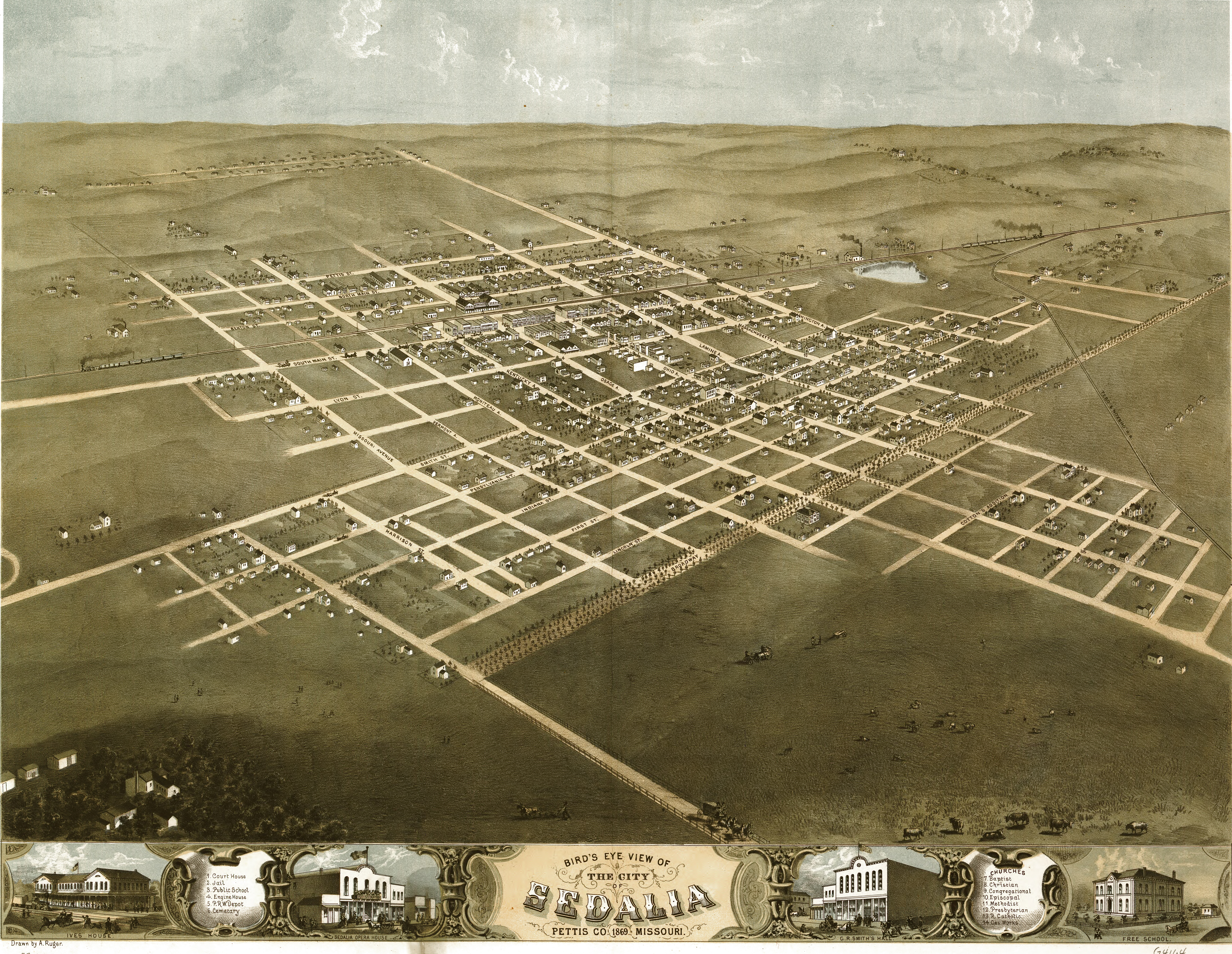
Sedalia in 1869

While the Civil War delayed development of the town in some respects, Sedalia was the terminus of the railroad for three years. Once the war was over, many of the thousands of Union soldiers who had been stationed more or less permanently at Sedalia and recognized its potential, made the choice to migrate there from their former homes in other areas. The population grew rapidly.

In the late 19th century, Sedalia was well known as a center of vice, especially prostitution, which accompanied its large floating class of railroad workers and commercial travelers. In 1877 the St. Louis Post-Dispatch called Sedalia the "Sodom and Gomorrah of the nineteenth century." Middle-class businessmen made money off illegal prostitution as building owners and lessees; others did business with people in the industry, who banked, used lawyers, etc., in town. Residents were reluctant to raise taxes and services were provided from the fines charged to prostitutes.

In the 1870s brothels were distributed throughout the city, but in the 1890s, they became more concentrated above businesses on West Main Street, as the middle class tried to isolate less desirable elements in town. These establishments also employed musicians, particularly piano players, contributing to a thriving musical culture. It fostered the development of many artists, including the renowned ragtime composer Scott Joplin.

=== 20th and 21st centuries ===
While the city attracted many commercial travelers and railroad workers, its population of married couples and families also grew. By 1900 its population of more than 15,000 made it the sixth-largest city in the state. The entrepreneurial middle class created more formal separations between its residential areas and those of working class whites and African Americans.

During World War II, the military built Sedalia Glider Base in Johnson County to the west. After the war, this facility was transferred to the Strategic Air Command. It was converted to a bomber base, the Whiteman Air Force Base, named after 2nd Lt. George A. Whiteman, an Army Air Corps pilot who was killed during the 1941 Japanese attack on Pearl Harbor. After a massive construction program, the base became the center of 150 ICBM silos and administrative offices. These were decommissioned in the 1990s.

Sedalia is home to the nation's first sheltered workshop, which opened in 1965.

The expansion of the railroad and cattle drives in the late 19th century brought many male laborers to the rough town on the frontier. It sparked the related rise of a notorious "red light district", with numerous prostitutes who did business with the men in saloons and brothels, which also featured musical entertainments.

As more families settled in the area, they made the culture more stable, creating institutions such as schools and churches. In the late 20th century, structural changes in the railroads meant the loss of many industrial jobs, but the city has held on to a population close to its 1960 peak while developing new bases for the economy. The city is informally known as the "Trailer Capital of the Midwest", due to the high number of trailer manufacturers and dealers in the area.

Residents have emphasized the colorful history of the town for heritage tourism, and identified many significant historic structures for state and national recognition.

According to The History of the Boy Scouts of America (William D. Murray, 1937), the first Boy Scout Troop in Missouri (and one of the first in the nation) was formed in Sedalia in 1909, a year before the national organization was officially chartered on February 8, 1910.

=== Tornadoes ===
On October 24, 2021, a EF0 tornado touched down east of Sedalia. It is the most recent tornado to strike Sedalia.

== Geography ==
According to the United States Census Bureau, the city has a total area of 13.32 square miles (34.50 km^{2}), of which 13.29 square miles (34.42 km^{2}) is land and 0.03 square miles (0.08 km^{2}) is water.

=== Climate ===
Sedalia has a typical temperate climate. As with most continental climates, the micropolitan area has four seasons. Springs in Sedalia are noted for their rainy days and variable temperatures. Thunderstorms are common and tornadoes occur during this time of year. Summers are usually hot and humid, with droughts occurring during several summers. Autumns are usually cool and rainy, although several days of warm weather are not uncommon. Winters are generally cold, with snow accumulating several days of the winter season. Although not as common, ice storms occur as well.

Climate data for Sedalia Water Plant, Missouri (1991–2020 normals, extremes 1893–present)
Month	Jan	Feb	Mar	Apr	May	Jun	Jul	Aug	Sep	Oct	Nov	Dec	Year
Record high °F (°C)	77 (25)	78 (26)	92 (33)	92 (33)	96 (36)	105 (41)	116 (47)	107 (42)	107 (42)	97 (36)	85 (29)	75 (24)	116 (47)
Mean maximum °F (°C)	63.7 (17.6)	69.0 (20.6)	77.6 (25.3)	84.0 (28.9)	87.4 (30.8)	92.1 (33.4)	96.3 (35.7)	96.6 (35.9)	91.6 (33.1)	84.8 (29.3)	73.7 (23.2)	66.1 (18.9)	97.9 (36.6)
Mean daily maximum °F (°C)	38.2 (3.4)	43.3 (6.3)	54.3 (12.4)	64.9 (18.3)	73.9 (23.3)	82.5 (28.1)	86.8 (30.4)	85.8 (29.9)	78.3 (25.7)	67.3 (19.6)	53.7 (12.1)	42.6 (5.9)	64.3 (18.0)
Daily mean °F (°C)	28.6 (−1.9)	33.1 (0.6)	43.0 (6.1)	53.3 (11.8)	63.3 (17.4)	72.7 (22.6)	76.9 (24.9)	75.1 (23.9)	67.0 (19.4)	55.5 (13.1)	43.2 (6.2)	33.2 (0.7)	53.7 (12.1)
Mean daily minimum °F (°C)	18.9 (−7.3)	22.9 (−5.1)	31.8 (−0.1)	41.8 (5.4)	52.8 (11.6)	62.9 (17.2)	66.9 (19.4)	64.3 (17.9)	55.6 (13.1)	43.6 (6.4)	32.6 (0.3)	23.8 (−4.6)	43.2 (6.2)
Mean minimum °F (°C)	−2.1 (−18.9)	3.2 (−16.0)	13.4 (−10.3)	26.8 (−2.9)	37.3 (2.9)	50.1 (10.1)	56.6 (13.7)	53.5 (11.9)	39.9 (4.4)	27.2 (−2.7)	16.0 (−8.9)	5.6 (−14.7)	−6.1 (−21.2)
Record low °F (°C)	−23 (−31)	−30 (−34)	−17 (−27)	15 (−9)	26 (−3)	40 (4)	44 (7)	39 (4)	27 (−3)	17 (−8)	−6 (−21)	−28 (−33)	−30 (−34)
Average precipitation inches (mm)	1.92 (49)	2.15 (55)	2.76 (70)	4.62 (117)	5.32 (135)	5.19 (132)	4.94 (125)	3.88 (99)	4.16 (106)	3.56 (90)	2.89 (73)	2.21 (56)	43.60 (1,107)
Average snowfall inches (cm)	4.9 (12)	2.7 (6.9)	1.7 (4.3)	0.1 (0.25)	0.0 (0.0)	0.0 (0.0)	0.0 (0.0)	0.0 (0.0)	0.0 (0.0)	0.1 (0.25)	0.4 (1.0)	3.2 (8.1)	13.1 (32.8)
Average precipitation days (≥ 0.01 in)	6.8	6.2	9.3	10.6	10.9	8.9	8.0	7.0	7.0	8.7	6.9	6.7	97.0
Average snowy days (≥ 0.1 in)	1.9	1.4	0.8	0.0	0.0	0.0	0.0	0.0	0.0	0.0	0.2	1.2	5.5
Source: NOAA

== Demographics ==
Historical population
Census	Pop.	Note	%±
1870	4,560		—
1880	9,561		109.7%
1890	14,068		47.1%
1900	15,231		8.3%
1910	17,822		17.0%
1920	21,144		18.6%
1930	20,806		−1.6%
1940	20,428		−1.8%
1950	20,354		−0.4%
1960	23,874		17.3%
1970	22,847		−4.3%
1980	20,927		−8.4%
1990	19,800		−5.4%
2000	20,339		2.7%
2010	21,387		5.2%
2020	21,725		1.6%
2023 (est.)	22,086		1.7%
U.S. Decennial Census

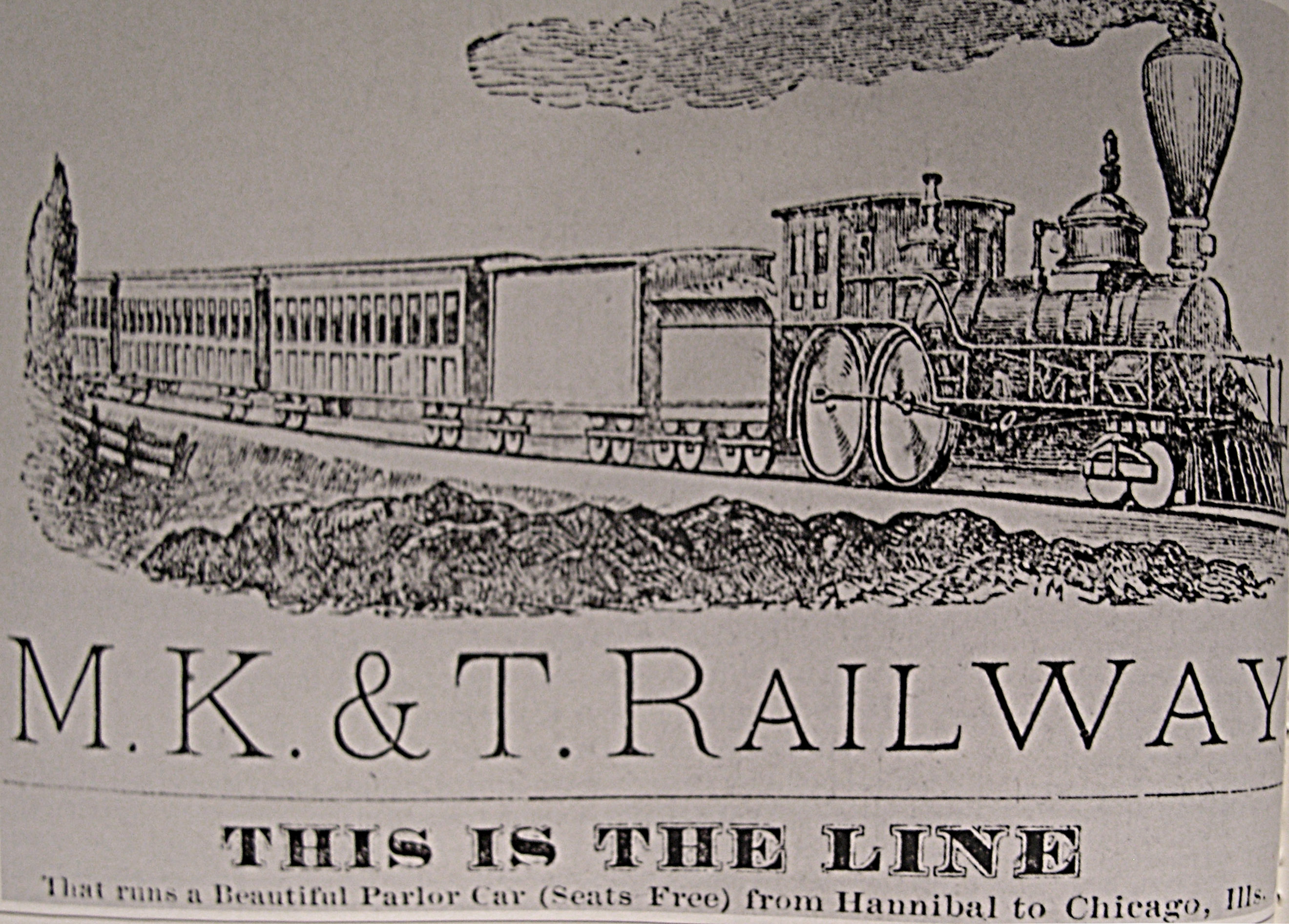
1881 advertisement for the K-T line

Sedalia had a population of around 300 people in 1860, and what was described as a "bona fide population" of around 1,000 in 1865. Sedalia has recently become home to many immigrants from Russia or former Soviet bloc nations, who may account for up to 15% of the population. Most of the Russian and Ukrainian immigrants who live in Sedalia are members of one of the seven Pentecostal Churches there.

=== 2020 census ===
As of the 2020 census, Sedalia had a population of 21,725, with 8,987 households and 5,056 families, and a population density of 1,520.3 per square mile (587.2/km^{2}).

There were 10,309 housing units, of which 12.8% were vacant. The homeowner vacancy rate was 3.2% and the rental vacancy rate was 10.9%.

Of the 8,987 households, 29.4% had children under the age of 18 living in them. Of all households, 35.1% were married-couple households, 21.5% were households with a male householder and no spouse or partner present, and 33.3% were households with a female householder and no spouse or partner present. About 36.2% of all households were made up of individuals and 16.0% had someone living alone who was 65 years of age or older. The average household size was 2.4 and the average family size was 3.1.

The median age was 36.5 years. 24.3% of residents were under the age of 18, 9.7% were from 18 to 24, 26.3% were from 25 to 44, 22.4% were from 45 to 64, and 17.2% were 65 years of age or older. For every 100 females there were 96.4 males, and for every 100 females age 18 and over there were 90.7 males age 18 and over.

99.4% of residents lived in urban areas, while 0.6% lived in rural areas.

Racial composition as of the 2020 census
Race	Number	Percent
White	16,754	77.1%
Black or African American	1,166	5.4%
American Indian and Alaska Native	145	0.7%
Asian	173	0.8%
Native Hawaiian and Other Pacific Islander	76	0.3%
Some other race	1,488	6.8%
Two or more races	1,923	8.9%
Hispanic or Latino (of any race)	2,746	12.6%

=== 2016–2020 American Community Survey ===
The 2016–2020 5-year American Community Survey estimates show that the median household income was $42,152 (with a margin of error of +/- $2,806) and the median family income was $55,083 (+/- $4,958). Males had a median income of $31,223 (+/- $1,860) versus $21,210 (+/- $2,076) for females. The median income for those above 16 years old was $26,397 (+/- $1,258). Approximately, 12.2% of families and 18.1% of the population were below the poverty line, including 24.3% of those under the age of 18 and 11.1% of those ages 65 or over.

=== 2010 census ===
As of the census of 2010, there were 21,387 people, 8,850 households, and 5,226 families residing in the city. The population density was 1,609.3 inhabitants per square mile (621.4/km^{2}). There were 9,979 housing units at an average density of 750.9 per square mile (289.9/km^{2}). The racial makeup of the city was 85.3% White, 5.2% African American, 0.5% Native American, 0.7% Asian, 0.1% Pacific Islander, 5.2% from other races, and 3.0% from two or more races. Hispanic or Latino of any race were 9.0% of the population.

There were 8,850 households, of which 31.8% had children under the age of 18 living with them, 39.3% were married couples living together, 14.4% had a female householder with no husband present, 5.3% had a male householder with no wife present, and 40.9% were non-families. 34.1% of all households were made up of individuals, and 13.6% had someone living alone who was 65 years of age or older. The average household size was 2.36 and the average family size was 3.00.

The median age in the city was 34.6 years. 25% of residents were under the age of 18; 11% were between the ages of 18 and 24; 26% were from 25 to 44; 23% were from 45 to 64; and 15% were 65 years of age or older. The gender makeup of the city was 48% male and 52% female.

=== 2000 census ===
As of the census of 2000, there were 20,339 people in the city, organized into 8,628 households and 5,228 families. The population density was 1,700.8 inhabitants per square mile (656.7/km^{2}). There were 9,419 housing units at an average density of 787.6 per square mile (304.1/km^{2}). The racial makeup of the city was 88.6% White, 5.0% African American, 0.4% Asian, 0.4% Native American, <0.1% Pacific Islander, 3.8% from other races, and 1.9% from two or more races. 5.6% of the population were Hispanic or Latino of any race.

There were 8,628 households, out of which 28.8% had children under the age of 18 living with them, 44.0% were married couples living together, 12.6% had a female householder with no husband present, and 39.4% were non-families. 33.1% of all households were made up of individuals, and 14.7% had someone living alone who was 65 years of age or older. The average household size was 2.32 and the average family size was 2.94.

In the city, the population was spread out, with 24.7% under the age of 18, 10.8% from 18 to 24, 27.7% from 25 to 44, 19.4% from 45 to 64, and 17.4% who were 65 years of age or older. The median age was 36 years. For every 100 females, there were 90.0 males. For every 100 females age 18 and over, there were 86.3 males.

The median income for a household in the city was $28,641, and the median income for a family was $34,938. Males had a median income of $28,208 versus $19,520 for females. The per capita income for the city was $15,931. 15.3% of the population and 12.5% of families were below the poverty line. Out of the total population, 20.8% of those under the age of 18 and 10.5% of those 65 and older were living below the poverty line.

== Arts and culture ==
=== Carnegie Library ===
The Sedalia Public Library was the first Carnegie Grant awarded in Missouri. The Board of Trustees received word of the $50,000 grant in the fall of 1899. After securing the property on which to build, and having gained voter approval of a tax to support the library, the Board laid the cornerstone in 1900. The building was completed in July 1901. Dedicated in 1901, the library is listed on the National Register of Historic Places.

=== Museums ===
Sedalia is home to the Daum Museum of Contemporary Art, named after its primary benefactor, Sedalia radiologist and art collector Harold Daum. The museum, located on the State Fair Community College campus, is home to the works of many famous artists including Dale Chihuly (1941–), Sam Francis (1923–1994), Helen Frankenthaler (1928–), Sol LeWitt (1928–2007), Robert Motherwell (1915–1991), Julian Schnabel (1951–), and Andy Warhol (1928–1987).

The 16,000-square-foot (1,500 m^{2}) museum, designed by St. Louis-based Gunn & Smith Architects, features three stories of gallery space—including a 3,400-square-foot (320 m^{2}) main gallery with a translucent clerestory, a cantilevered stairway, a two-story atrium, and an open-air sculpture court. It features both permanent displays as well as temporary displays from world-renowned artists.

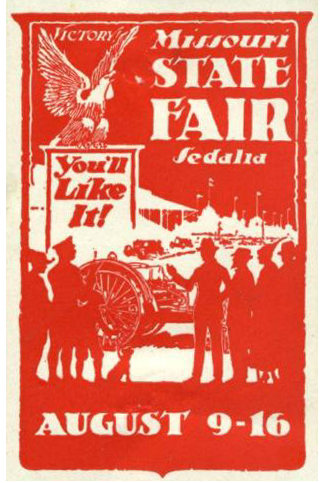
Poster stamp for the Missouri State Fair, c.1930.

Sedalia is also home to The Pettis County Museum and Historical Society, located at 228 Dundee Ave. The building was once a Jewish Synagogue and features many Historical artifacts from all periods of Pettis County history. It is currently open on Friday and Saturday from 1:00pm to 4:00pm, and by appointment at other times.

=== State Fair ===
Since 1901, the Missouri State Fair has been held in Sedalia every August, with the exception of 1943 and 1944 because of World War II. Many singers and actors make the annual trip to the fair. Ronald Reagan, George W. Bush and other presidents have given speeches on the fairgrounds, though not during the State Fair.

In 1974, the Missouri State Fairgrounds was the site of the Ozark Music Festival, one of the largest but least remembered major music festivals of the 1970s. While the plan was for the pop/rock/bluegrass festival's selling about 50,000 tickets, an influx of about 184,000 fans and many rock bands strained the capacity of the fairgrounds and the city. Some estimates put the crowd count at 350,000. It counts as one of the largest music events (Rock Festivals) in history. The festival, hosted by Wolfman Jack, took out a full-page ad in Rolling Stone magazine and attracted people from outside the region.

=== Historic sites ===
The following Sedalia locations have been listed on the National Register of Historic Places:

- Building at 217 West Main Street, former brothel
- G and G Veterinary Hospital
- William H. Gentry House
- John T. and Lillian Heard House
- Harris House
- Hotel Bothwell
- C.C. Hubbard High School
- Henry Jones Farmstead
- McVey School
- Missouri, Kansas and Texas Railroad Depot
- Missouri/Sedalia Trust Company
- Missouri State Fairgrounds Historic District
- Sedalia Commercial Historic District
- Sedalia Public Library

=== Little Sister of Liberty ===
In 1950, to celebrate its fortieth anniversary—which had the theme of "Strengthen the Arm of Liberty"—the Boy Scouts of America donated two hundred 8 ft 6in (260 cm) copper replicas of the Statue of Liberty, which were known collectively as the "Little Sisters of Liberty", to various communities in 39 states. The project was the brainchild of the Scout Commissioner of the (then) Kansas City Area Council, Kansas City businessman J.P. Whitaker.

One of the 200 replicas was donated to Sedalia; and it was installed at the County Courthouse.

=== A Sedalia Christmas ===
A Sedalia Christmas is a multi-media play written in celebration of the Christmas traditions and celebrations of Sedalia from 1866 to 1969. It was written by Rebecca Imhauser, a Sedalia native. Local actors and actresses portray Sedalians and the events that shaped their lives. Historic photos are projected during the play to represent pivotal time frames, with an emphasis on Christmas during the depression and World War II eras. Sedalia's Christmas heritage is celebrated through favorite holiday and patriotic songs, as well as choreographed dance numbers. This musical is set in Sedalia. Imhauser, a member of the Board of the Liberty Center Arts Association, created the show in 2008, basing it on her own knowledge, extensive research of Sedalia's history and from her book All Along Ohio Street. The musical was first performed in the Liberty Center, a theater in downtown Sedalia, on December 5, 2008. It was shown again in December 2009 with an improved script and a slightly altered cast.

== Education ==
The overwhelming majority of the city limits is in the Sedalia School District 200, administers one early childhood center, five elementary schools, one middle school, one junior high school, and two high schools, Smith-Cotton High School (the comprehensive high school), and Whittier High School (an alternative school). and A small part of the municipal limits is in the Pettis County R-XII School District.

Sacred Heart Elementary and High School, St. Paul's Lutheran School, and Applewood Christian School are private institutions.

State Fair Community College is a public two-year institution offering post-secondary college level courses.

George R. Smith College, a historically black college (HBCU), operated from 1894 until it burned down on April 26, 1925.

The Sedalia Business College and Institute of Penmanship was founded in 1881. It was the predecessor of Robbins' Business College, founded by Clark W. Robbins (1858–1918) in 1883. This evolved into Central Business College.

== Media ==
=== Newspapers ===
A number of newspapers have been published in Sedalia, in alphabetical order:

- The Daily Democrat (1871–1873)
- The Independent Press (1871–1873)
- The Pacific Enterprise (1863–1864)
- The Sedalia Advertiser (1864–1865)
- The Sedalia Bazoo (1881–1895)
- The Sedalia Capital
- The Sedalia Daily Democrat (1874–1925)
- The Sedalia Democrat (1949–)
- The Sedalia News-Journal (2003–)
- The Sedalia Times

=== Radio stations ===
- KSDL 92.3FM (Sedalia)
- KSIS 1050 AM (Sedalia)
- KXKX 105.7 FM (Sedalia)
- KDRO 1490 AM (Sedalia)
- KPOW 97.7 FM (Sedalia)

=== Television stations ===
- KMOS-TV (Channel 6)
- K11OJ-TV (Channel 11)

== Infrastructure ==
=== Transportation ===
==== Air ====
- Sedalia Regional Airport

==== Train ====
- Sedalia (Amtrak station)

== In popular culture ==
=== Film ===
The 1948 film Scudda Hoo! Scudda Hay! premiered at Fox Theatres. The premiere was attended by Lon McCallister, Colleen Townsend, Luanne Hogan and Betty Ann Lynn. A crowd of over 10,000 gathered to watch the celebrities paraded through downtown Sedalia on a donkey cart.

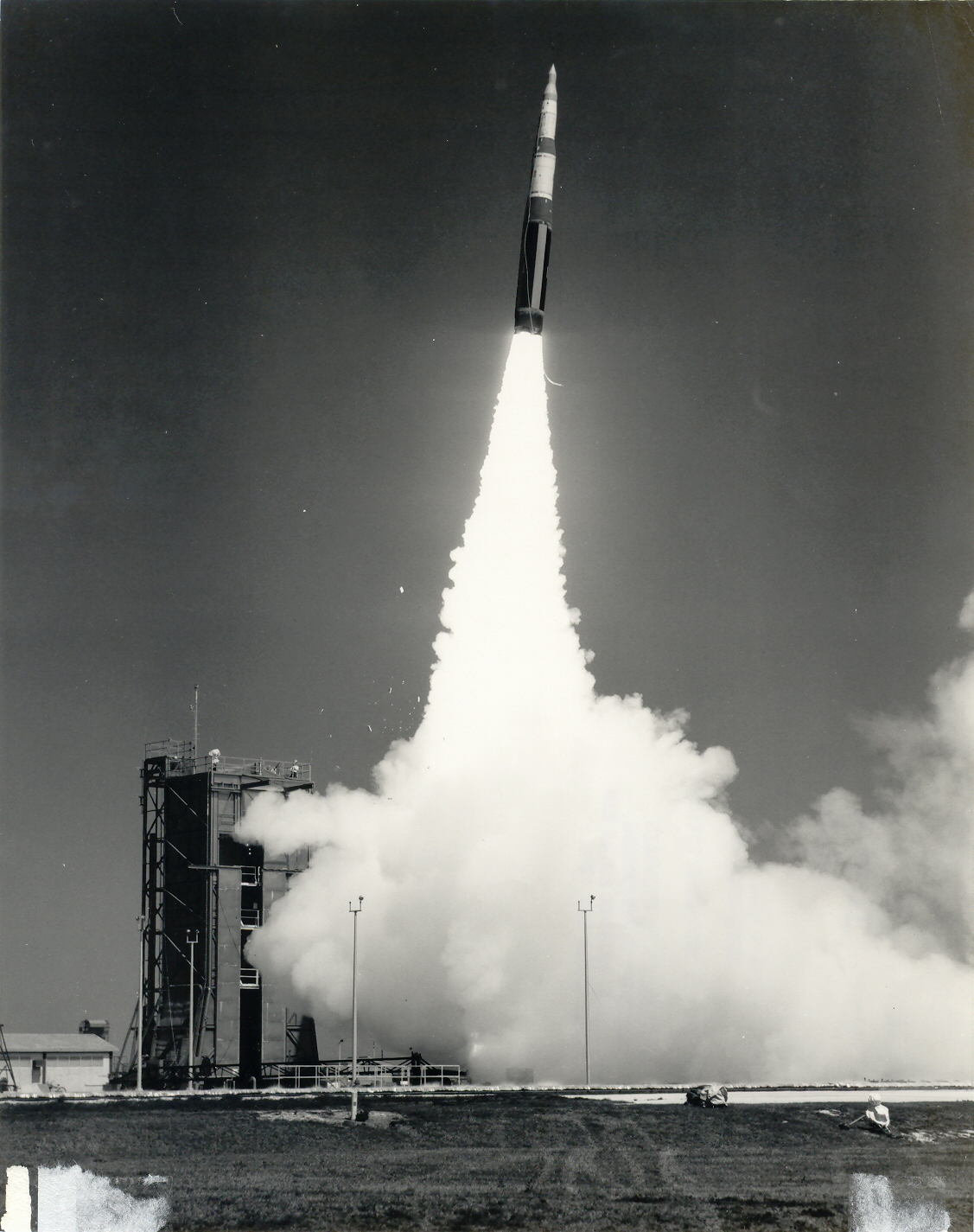
Minuteman II missile launch

In the American television movie The Day After (1983), aired by ABC, Sedalia is destroyed when the Soviet Union attacks the Minuteman II Missile silos around the area. At the time of the movie's release, 150 of the missiles were located in the Sedalia area in underground silos. They had been sited there since activation in early 1964 of the first Minuteman missiles under the control of the 351st Missile Wing located at Whiteman Air Force Base. The release of the movie led to a significant (if belated) increase in local community concern about the missiles. Concern remained high until all the missiles were dismantled between 1992 and 1997 as a result of the Strategic Arms Reduction Treaty between the United States and Russia.

Sedalia was featured in two widely seen 1977 films: Heroes, starring Henry Winkler and Harrison Ford; and the made-for-TV movie Scott Joplin, starring Billy Dee Williams.

Sedalia was mentioned briefly in the motion picture MASH. Parts of the 1941 film Bad Men of Missouri are set in Sedalia. The city was mentioned in Old Yeller.

=== Television ===
The classic, long running Western series Rawhide, which ran on CBS from 1959 to 1966, featured Sedalia as a destination for cattle drives. It starred Eric Fleming as the trail boss, Gil Favor, and the emerging Clint Eastwood as the "ramrod" (i.e., second in charge), Rowdy Yates.

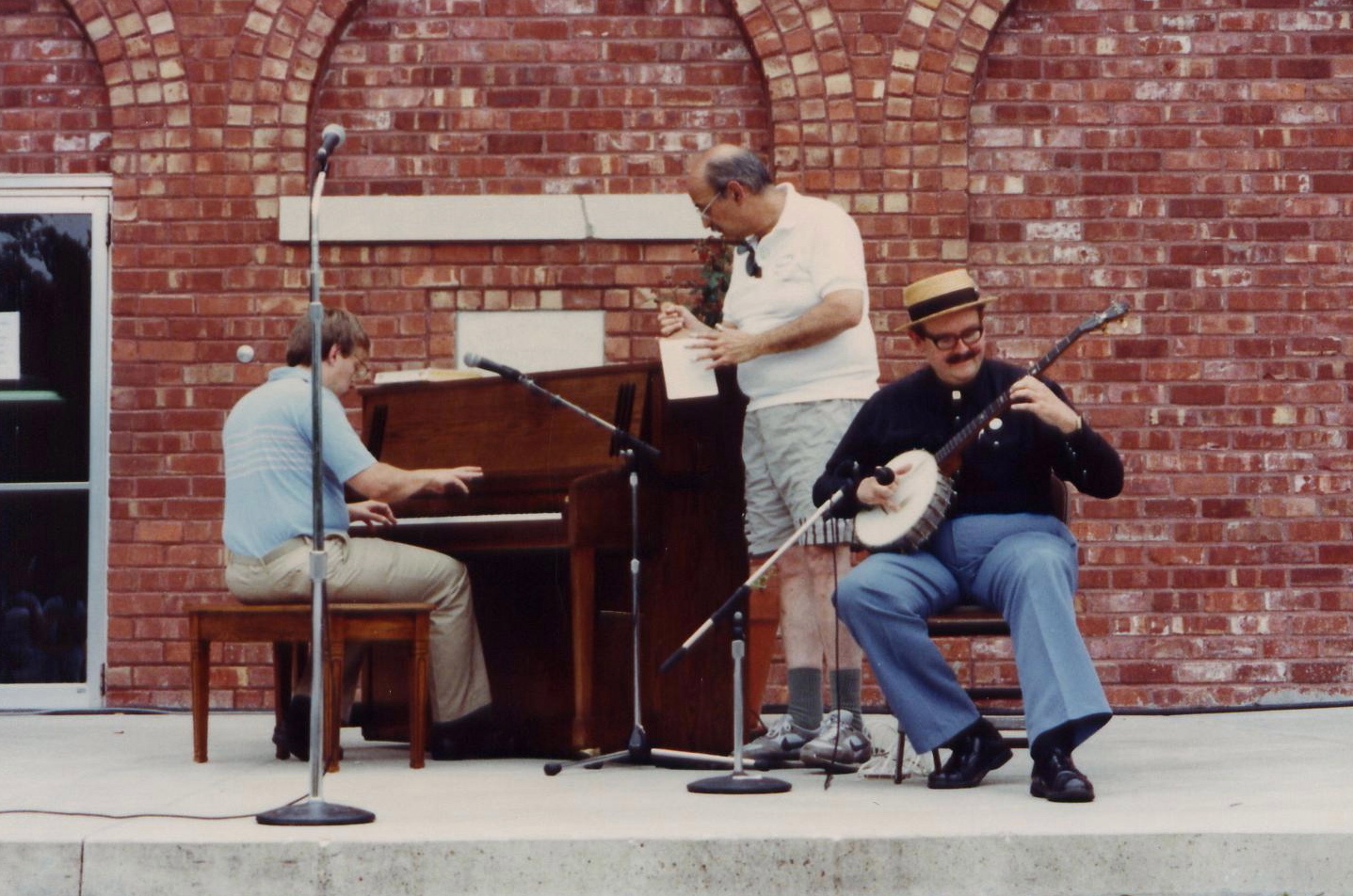
Scott Joplin Ragtime Festival, Sedalia, 1990

=== Music ===
Sedalia is well known as the adopted home of ragtime music's most well known musician and stylist Scott Joplin. Joplin's famous Maple Leaf Rag was named for a saloon in Sedalia. Sedalia was also the hometown to Joe Harris, vocalist and trombonist with Benny Goodman and His Orchestra and later MGM Studios.

In 1935, in the midst of the Great Depression, which affected Sedalia severely, Abe Rosenthal along with other music-loving residents formed the Sedalia Symphony Society and established a symphony orchestra, which, as the second oldest in Missouri, celebrated its 75th season in 2009–2010.

Sedalia has been the host to several rock and roll events, such as the Ozark Music Festival in 1974, and the Delicious Rox Festival in 2006.

== See also ==
- Ozark Music Festival
- Sedalia Air Force Base
- Sierra Bullets
