= Beaverdam Creek =

Beaverdam Creek or Beaver Dam Creek may refer to:

== Streams ==
- Beaverdam Creek (Broadkill River tributary), a stream in Sussex County, Delaware
- Beaverdam Creek (Soque River tributary), a stream in Georgia
- Beaverdam Creek (Wicomico County), a stream in Maryland
- Beaverdam Creek (Little Black River tributary), a stream in Missouri
- Beaverdam Creek (Salt River tributary), a stream in Missouri
- Beaverdam Creek (South Fork Blackwater River tributary), a stream in Missouri
- Beaverdam Brook (New Jersey), a tributary of Lawrence Brook
- Beaverdam Creek (New York), converges with Fox Creek near Berne
- Beaverdam Creek (Crabtree Creek tributary), a stream in Wake County, North Carolina
- Beaverdam Creek (Lanes Creek tributary), a stream in Union County, North Carolina
- Beaverdam Creek (Trent River tributary), a stream in Jones and Craven counties, North Carolina
- Beaverdam Creek (Conewago Creek tributary), a stream in Pennsylvania
- Beaver Dam Creek (South Dakota), a stream
- Beaverdam Creek (Duck River tributary), a stream in Tennessee

== Other uses ==
- Beaverdam Creek Archaeological Site, in Elbert County, Georgia
- Beaverdam Creek (conservation area), in Virginia and Tennessee
- Battle of Beaver Dam Creek, in Hanover County, Virginia
