= Beaverdam Creek (South Fork Blackwater River tributary) =

Stream in Missouri, U.S.

Coordinates: 38°50′56″N 93°25′29″W

Beaverdam Creek (also spelled Beaver Dam Creek) is a stream in Pettis County in the U.S. state of Missouri. It is a tributary of the South Fork Blackwater River.

The stream headwaters arise approximately one mile north of the community of La Monte at and it flows generally north about four miles parallel to and just east of Missouri Route 127 to its confluence with the South Fork approximately 2.5 miles east-northeast of the community of Stokley at .

Beaverdam Creek was so named due to the presence of beaver dams in the area.

== See also ==
- List of rivers of Missouri
