= Bahner =

Bahner may refer to:

- Bahner (surname)
- Bahner, Missouri, an unincorporated community in Pettis County, Missouri, US
- 2358 Bahner, a main-belt asteroid
