= Spring Fork =

Spring Fork may refer to:

- Spring Fork, Missouri, an unincorporated community
- Spring Fork (Missouri), a stream in Missouri
