= Muddy Creek (Lamine River tributary) =

Stream in the US state of Missouri

Muddy Creek is a stream in Johnson and Pettis Counties in the U.S. state of Missouri. It is a tributary of Lamine River.

The stream headwaters arise in southeastern Johnson County just east of the community of Sutherland and Missouri Route 23 at 38°34′47″N 93°34′08″W. The stream flows northeast and enters Pettis County about three miles southeast of Whiteman Air Force Base. The stream continues to the northeast passing under Missouri Route 127 three miles south of LaMonte and under U.S. Route 50 three miles west of Sedalia. It crosses under U.S. Route 65 six miles north of Sedalia. The stream passes south of the community of Newland and enters the Lamine River just west of the Pettis-Cooper county line four miles north-northwest of Clifton City at 38°50′48″N 93°03′23″W.

Muddy Creek was so named on account of its muddy water.

== See also ==
- List of rivers of Missouri
