= Elk Fork =

Elk Fork or Elkfork may refer to:

- Elkfork, Kentucky, an unincorporated community
- Elk Fork (Muddy Creek), a stream in Missouri
- Elk Fork (South Grand River), a stream in Missouri
- Elk Fork (Point Pleasant Creek), a stream in West Virginia
