= Smelser Creek =

Stream in the US state of Missouri

Smelser Creek is a stream in Pettis County in the U.S. state of Missouri. It is a tributary of Muddy Creek.

The stream headwaters arise approximately two miles southeast of Hughesville at 38°49′03″N 93°16′36″W. The stream flows to the southeast for about two miles then swings to the east and northeast before reaching its confluence with Muddy Creek one-half mile west of US Route 65 approximately six miles north of Sedalia at 38°48′00″N 93°13′58″W.

Smelser Creek has the name of an early settler.

== See also ==
- List of rivers of Missouri
