= Longwood Township, Pettis County, Missouri =

Township in Pettis County, Missouri, U.S.

Coordinates: 38.8767°N 93.2119°W

Longwood Township is an inactive township in Pettis County, in the U.S. state of Missouri.

Longwood Township takes its name from the community of Longwood, Missouri.
