= Stokley, Missouri =

Unincorporated community in Missouri, U.S.

Coordinates: 38°50′22″N 93°28′11″W

Stokley (also spelled Stokeley) is an unincorporated community in northwest Pettis County, in the U.S. state of Missouri.

The community is approximately five miles northwest of LaMonte and six miles northeast of Knob Noster in adjacent Johnson County. It is on a county road 1.5 miles west of Missouri Route 127.

== History ==
A post office called Stokley was established in 1884, and remained in operation until 1902. The community most likely has the surname of a local family.
