= Maude Omega Thomas =

American educator and newspaper publisher

Member of the Oklahoma Highway Commission
- In office 1932
- Appointed by: William H. Murray

Personal details
- Born: January 23, 1881 Green Ridge, Missouri, United States
- Died: November 19, 1956 (aged 75) Beaver, Oklahoma, United States
- Political party: Republican

Maude Omega Thomas (January 23, 1881 – November 19, 1956) was an American educator and newspaper publisher from Oklahoma. She was the long term publisher of the Beaver Herald in Oklahoma. In 1932, she was appointed to the Oklahoma Highway Commission by Governor William H. Murray for a few months.

== Biography ==
Maude Omega Thomas was born on January 23, 1881, in Green Ridge, Missouri, to John Richard Thomas and Mary Jane Coombe. Her family briefly moved to Kansas before settling in Beaver City. She attended the University of Oklahoma for one semester before working as a teacher and for the Beaver Herald. In February 1902, she bought the Herald and published the paper for the next 21 years. She was a prohibitionist and banned advertisements for alcohol in her paper. In 1932, when she was a member of the Republican Party, Governor William H. Murray appointed her to the Oklahoma Highway Commission for a few months. She died on November 19, 1956, in Beaver, Oklahoma.
