= Brownsville Revival =

Christian Pentecostal revival starting in Pensacola, Florida

The Brownsville Revival (also known as the Pensacola Outpouring) was a widely reported Christian revival within the Pentecostal movement that began on Father's Day June 18, 1995, at Brownsville Assembly of God in Pensacola, Florida. Characteristics of the Brownsville Revival movement, as with other Christian religious revivals, included acts of repentance by parishioners and a call to holiness, inspired by the manifestation of the Holy Spirit. Some of the occurrences in this revival fit the description of moments of religious ecstasy. More than four million people are reported to have attended the revival meetings from its beginnings in 1995 to around 2000.

== Description ==
One writer offered this description of the revival in 1998:

All told, more than 2.5 million people have visited the church's Monday prayer and Tues-through-Saturday evening revival services, where they sang rousing worship music and heard old-fashioned sermons on sin and salvation. After the sermons were over, hundreds of thousands accepted the invitation to leave their seats and rush forward to a large area in front of the stage-like altar. Here, they "get right with God." . . . Untold thousands have hit the carpet in repentance. After the altar call, pastors and leaders would pray for anyone who desired to be prayed over some fell to the ground some shook under the power of God's presence some lay in a state resembling a coma, sometimes remaining flat on the floor for hours at a time. Some participants call the experience being "slain in the Spirit." Others simply refer to receiving the touch of God. Regardless of what they call it, these people are putting the "roll" back in "holy roller."

— Steve Rabey

== History ==
In 1993, two years before the revival began, Brownsville's pastor, John Kilpatrick, began directing his congregation to pray for revival. Over the next two years, he talked constantly about bringing revival to the church, even going as far as to threaten to leave the church if it didn't accept the revival. Supporters of the revival would also cite prophecies by Dr. David Yonggi Cho, pastor of Yoido Full Gospel Church, as evidence that the revival was inspired by God. According to Cho, God told him he was "going to send revival to the seaside city of Pensacola, and it will spread like a fire until all of America has been consumed by it."

On Father's Day June 18, 1995, a Sunday, the revival began, evangelist Steve Hill was the guest speaker, having been invited by Kilpatrick. Later, Hill and Kilpatrick, told of "a mighty wind" that blew through the church, an account that quickly spread across the Pentecostal community. Kilpatrick had been talking "revival" for several months. As the nightly revival meetings continued, Hill canceled all plans to go to Russia, and preached several revival services each week for the next five years.

Hundreds of those who attended services were moved to renew their faith during Hill's sermons. In time, the church opened its doors for Tuesday-through-Saturday evening revival services to accommodate the thousands of people who arrived and waited in the church parking lot before dawn for a chance to enter the packed sanctuary, some even camping overnight waiting for the doors to open .

By 1997, it was common to have lengthy and rapturous periods of singing and dancing and altars packed with hundreds of writhing or dead-still bodies from a variety of ages, races and socioeconomic conditions. As the revival progressed, the testimonies of people receiving salvation were joined by testimonies of supernatural healings. In Steve Hill's words, "We're seeing miraculous healings, cancerous tumors disappear and drug addicts immediately delivered." However, the church told local news reporters that it did not keep records of the healings. In 1997, the leaders of the revival—Hill, Kilpatrick, and Lindell Cooley (Brownsville's worship director)—went to several cities (Anaheim, Dallas, St. Louis, Lake Charles (Louisiana), Toledo, and Birmingham) and held like meetings. They named this ministry "Awake America".

The primary part of the revival ended in 2000 when Hill moved on to pursue other works. In 2003, Hill founded a church in the Dallas area where he served as senior pastor. After a long bout with cancer, Hill died in March 2014. Cooley left in October 2003. Kilpatrick resigned as senior pastor in 2003 to form an evangelistic association of his own. Until 2006, the church continued to hold special Friday-night services that were a continuation of the revival, but amidst falling congregations, the church fell heavily into debt.

== Aftermath ==
During the revival, nearly 200,000 accepted Christianity, and by the Fall of 2000 more than 1,000 people who experienced the revival were enrolled at the Brownsville Revival School of Ministry. Thousands of pastors visited Brownsville and returned to their home congregations, leading to an outbreak of mini-revivals that helped the Assemblies of God recover from what some saw as a denominational decline.

One follow-on revival, often called the Smithton Outpouring, occurred in the small town of Smithton, Missouri, at Smithton Community Church. It was significant because it was not connected with the Assemblies of God. The pastor, Steve Gray, visited the Brownsville Revival in 1996 while in the midst of personal turmoil, returned to his church of 150 members and hosted a 3-year revival which saw about 250,000 visitors. The revival is also significant because the ministry of Steve Gray and a significant number of his followers remain active in Kansas City, where 85% of the congregation moved in 2000. The ministry he pastors, World Revival Church, emphasizes the attitude and mission of revival.

In 2001 there was a mini-split which occurred between the leadership of the Brownville Revival Church and the leadership of the Brownville Revival School of Ministry. This split for many marked the end of the Revival. This led to the creation of The F.I.R.E. School of Ministry (Fellowship for International Revival and Evangelism) under the former leader of B.R.S.M., Dr. Michael Brown. B.R.S.M. continued to offer classes for several years before being merged into a Ministry of Tommy Tenney. As of Sep 2025 the Fire School of Ministry was still operating in Concord, North Carolina.

== Criticism ==
The meetings were criticized by some Christians and by the local news media. The Pensacola News Journal ran a series of investigative articles which focused on the donations raised during the meetings and where those funds went, as well as the claims of miraculous healings at the services and the spontaneity of the revival's beginnings. The newspaper revealed that a videotape of the Father's Day service that sparked the revival showed it was far less dramatic than later claimed.

The News Journal began a four-month investigation after former members told reporters that all was not as it appeared at the church. The series won George Polk awards from such groups as National Headliner, the Scripps-Howard Foundation, and the Society of Professional Journalists. Brownsville Assembly of God responded to the paper's allegations by publishing a paid advertisement (thus shielding them from a response from the paper) in the News Journal entitled, "The Facts of The Brownsville Revival".

Hank Hanegraaff, a well known cessationist and author of the book Counterfeit Revival, criticized the revival for "serious distortions of biblical Christianity" in the meetings, comparing the physical manifestations to pagan practices.

J Lee Grady, editor for Charisma Magazine, was critical of the division that had grown within the leadership at the last stage of the revival. He also reported that numerous former attendees now attend local Baptist churches.

== See also ==
- 2023 Asbury revival
- Toronto Blessing
