= Elk Fork (Muddy Creek tributary) =

Stream in the US state of Missouri

Coordinates: 38.69085°N 93.46521°W

Elk Fork is a stream in Pettis County in the U.S. state of Missouri. It is a tributary of Muddy Creek.

Elk Fork was so named on account of elk in the area.

== See also ==
- List of rivers of Missouri
