= Tedieville, Missouri =

- Unincorporated community
- Location within Missouri
- Coordinates: 38°55′12″N 93°16′20″W
- Country: United States
- State: Missouri
- County: Pettis County
- Township: Longwood Township
- Elevation: 804 ft (245 m)
- Time zone: UTC-6 (Central (CST))
  - Summer (DST): UTC-5 (CDT)
- ZIP code: 65333
- GNIS feature ID: 737947

Tedieville was an unincorporated community in northern Pettis County, Missouri, United States.

The community was located on Missouri Route CC approximately 4.5 miles northeast of Houstonia and one mile south of the Pettis-Saline county line.

== History ==
A post office called Tedieville was established in 1887, and remained in operation until 1903. It is unknown why the name "Tedieville" was applied to this community.
