= Arator, Missouri =

Extinct hamlet in Missouri, U.S.

Coordinates: 38.7145°N 93.0916°W

Arator is an extinct town in Pettis County, in the U.S. state of Missouri.

Arator was platted in 1830. It is unclear why the name "Arator" was applied to this community. A post office called Arator was established in 1835, and remained in operation until 1862. Besides the post office, Arator had a schoolhouse.
