= Postal, Missouri =

- Unincorporated community
- Location within Missouri
- Coordinates: 38°53′51″N 93°5′0″W
- Country: United States
- State: Missouri
- County: Pettis
- Elevation: 823 ft (251 m)
- Time zone: UTC-6 (Central (CST))
  - Summer (DST): UTC-5 (CDT)
- Area code: 660
- GNIS feature ID: 741170

Postal is an unincorporated community in Pettis County, Missouri, United States.

== History ==
The community was named for its country post office. A post office called Postal was established in 1891, and remained in operation until 1904. Postal also contained a schoolhouse, which is now defunct.
