= Spring Fork, Missouri =

- Unincorporated community
- Interactive map of Spring Fork, Missouri
- Coordinates: 38°34′43″N 93°14′19″W
- Country: United States
- State: Missouri
- County: Pettis
- Elevation: 902 ft (275 m)
- Time zone: UTC-6 (Central (CST))
  - Summer (DST): UTC-5 (CDT)
- GNIS feature ID: 741278

Spring Fork is an unincorporated community in Pettis County, Missouri, United States.

== History ==
A post office called Springfork was established in 1906, and remained in operation until 1925. The community takes its name from Spring Fork creek.
