= Green Ridge Township, Pettis County, Missouri =

Inactive township in the US state of Missouri

Coordinates: 38.5747°N 93.4547°W

Green Ridge Township is an inactive township in Pettis County, in the U.S. state of Missouri.

Green Ridge Township was erected in 1873, and named for a verdant ridge within its borders.
