= Bryson, Missouri =

- Unincorporated community
- Location within Missouri
- Coordinates: 38°34′49″N 93°28′44″W
- Country: United States
- State: Missouri
- County: Pettis
- Elevation: 951 ft (290 m)
- Time zone: UTC-6 (Central (CST))
  - Summer (DST): UTC-5 (CDT)
- Area code: 660
- GNIS feature ID: 740704

Bryson (also Rodelia or Kansas City Junction) is an unincorporated community in Pettis County, Missouri, United States.

A variant name was "Rodelia". A post office called Rodelia was established in 1896, and remained in operation until 1914. The identity of namesake Bryson is unknown.
