= Smithton School District =

School district in Missouri, U.S.

Address
- 505 South Myrtle Avenue Smithton, Missouri, 65350; United States
- Coordinates: 38°40′45″N 93°05′35″W

District information
- Type: Public
- Grades: PreK–12
- NCES District ID: 2928380

Students and staff
- Students: 533
- Teachers: 45.33 (FTE)
- Staff: 33.34 (FTE)
- Student–teacher ratio: 11.76
- District mascot: Tigers

Other information
- Website: www.smithton.k12.mo.us

The Smithton School District is located in Smithton, a city in Pettis County in the United States state of Missouri.

== History ==
The school opened on 23 December 1912, and the Smithton School District has since become the heart of the town. The current principal is Jon Peterson. This district has a grade span of K-12. The school's athletic teams are known as the Tigers.

== Board members ==
- Bybee, Eddie (2017) President
- Brown, Jason (2016) Vice President
- Nesler, Steven Treasurer
- Barnes, Linda Secretary
- Williams, Becky (2016)
- Frazee, John (2017)
- Moore, Sarah (2017)
- Asbury, Kyle (2018)
- Wehrman, Greg (2018)

== Administrators ==
- Superintendent: Dylan Holloway, Ed.D.
- High School Principal: Charley Clark
- Middle School Principal: Jacob Rogers
- Elementary Principal: Dylan Holloway
- Special Education Director: Drake may
