= Green Ridge, Missouri =

City in Pettis County, Missouri, United States

- City
- Location of Green Ridge, Missouri
- Coordinates: 38°37′16″N 93°24′37″W
- Country: United States
- State: Missouri
- County: Pettis

Area
  - Total: 0.44 sq mi (1.13 km^{2})
  - Land: 0.43 sq mi (1.11 km^{2})
  - Water: 0.0077 sq mi (0.02 km^{2})
- Elevation: 899 ft (274 m)

Population (2020)
  - Total: 468
  - Density: 1,090.8/sq mi (421.15/km^{2})
- Time zone: UTC-6 (Central (CST))
  - Summer (DST): UTC-5 (CDT)
- ZIP code: 65332
- Area code: 660
- FIPS code: 29-29332
- GNIS feature ID: 2394978

Green Ridge is a city located along Route 127 in Pettis County, Missouri, United States. As of the 2020 census, Green Ridge had a population of 468.

== History ==
Green Ridge was founded when the railroad was extended to its site. The town was platted in 1870.

== Geography ==
According to the United States Census Bureau, the city has a total area of 0.44 square miles (1.14 km^{2}), of which 0.43 square miles (1.11 km^{2}) is land and 0.01 square miles (0.03 km^{2}) is water.

== Demographics ==
Historical population
Census	Pop.	Note	%±
1880	147		—
1900	389		—
1910	436		12.1%
1920	382		−12.4%
1930	358		−6.3%
1940	350		−2.2%
1950	335		−4.3%
1960	375		11.9%
1970	403		7.5%
1980	488		21.1%
1990	452		−7.4%
2000	445		−1.5%
2010	476		7.0%
2020	468		−1.7%
U.S. Decennial Census

=== 2010 census ===
As of the census of 2010, there were 476 people, 176 households, and 130 families living in the city. The population density was 1,107.0 inhabitants per square mile (427.4/km^{2}). There were 194 housing units at an average density of 451.2 per square mile (174.2/km^{2}). The racial makeup of the city was 95.4% White, 0.2% African American, 1.9% from other races, and 2.5% from two or more races. Hispanic or Latino of any race were 2.7% of the population.

There were 176 households, of which 36.4% had children under the age of 18 living with them, 55.7% were married couples living together, 14.2% had a female householder with no husband present, 4.0% had a male householder with no wife present, and 26.1% were non-families. 19.3% of all households were made up of individuals, and 7.9% had someone living alone who was 65 years of age or older. The average household size was 2.70 and the average family size was 3.13.

The median age in the city was 37 years. 26.3% of residents were under the age of 18; 9.1% were between the ages of 18 and 24; 25.2% were from 25 to 44; 26.4% were from 45 to 64; and 13.2% were 65 years of age or older. The gender makeup of the city was 50.4% male and 49.6% female.

=== 2000 censu ===
As of the census of 2000, there were 445 people, 168 households, and 118 families living in the city. The population density was 1,002.0 inhabitants per square mile (386.9/km^{2}). There were 187 housing units at an average density of 421.1 per square mile (162.6/km^{2}). The racial makeup of the city was 97.08% White, 0.22% Native American, 2.25% from other races, and 0.45% from two or more races. Hispanic or Latino of any race were 2.92% of the population.

There were 168 households, out of which 37.5% had children under the age of 18 living with them, 56.5% were married couples living together, 10.1% had a female householder with no husband present, and 29.2% were non-families. 24.4% of all households were made up of individuals, and 14.9% had someone living alone who was 65 years of age or older. The average household size was 2.65 and the average family size was 3.22.

In the city the population was spread out, with 29.2% under the age of 18, 7.0% from 18 to 24, 31.0% from 25 to 44, 20.7% from 45 to 64, and 12.1% who were 65 years of age or older. The median age was 34 years. For every 100 females there were 93.5 males. For every 100 females age 18 and over, there were 95.7 males.

The median income for a household in the city was $36,750, and the median income for a family was $44,000. Males had a median income of $31,250 versus $20,313 for females. The per capita income for the city was $14,942. About 6.1% of families and 10.7% of the population were below the poverty line, including 16.2% of those under age 18 and 13.6% of those age 65 or over.

== Points of interest ==
- Katy Trail Trailhead

== Notable person ==
- Pearl White, star of silent films

== See also ==
- List of cities in Missouri
