= Lindell Cooley =

American pastor & singer (born 1963)

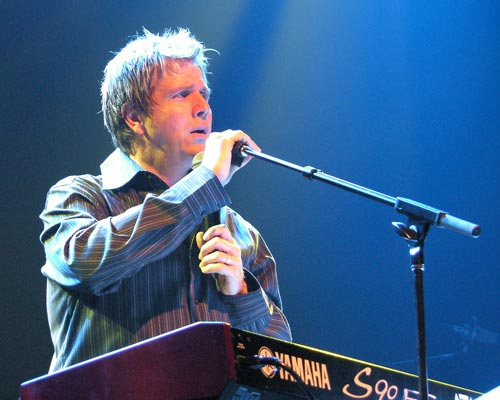

Background information
- Born: Lindell Cooley; February 3, 1963 (age 63)
- Origin: Red Bay, Alabama U.S.
- Genres: Contemporary worship music, CCM
- Occupations: Pastor, worship leader, singer, songwriter,
- Instrument: piano
- Years active: 1989–present
- Labels: Music Missions International, Inc.
- Website: www.lindellcooley.com

Lindell Cooley (born February 3, 1963) is a pastor, Christian singer and was worship leader of the Brownsville Revival in Pensacola, Florida.

He is known for his soulful gospel and rock-infused contemporary worship music.

Cooley is president of Music Missions International (MMI) and pastor at Grace Church in Nashville, Tennessee.

== Biography ==
Raised as the only child of a minister in Northern Alabama, Lindell Cooley was surrounded by ministry and music throughout his formative years. His first practical musical experience came when he was taught to play the tambourine at the age of five. From there, he went on to play the drums, bass guitar, organ and piano.

Nearly three decades later, he currently serves as president of Music Missions International (MMI) and pastor at Grace Church: Nashville in Franklin, Tennessee.

Looking back on his early days as a budding musician and worship leader, Cooley is still surprised by the orchestrating hand that carefully prepared him for his current position. “My family and I often did concerts in addition to regular church services,” he recalls. “It was when they needed to produce a custom recording for radio stations that I learned to make records.”

At 21, Cooley was spending part of his time playing the piano with Christian musicians Lenny LeBlanc and Rusty Goodman and the other part serving as associate and children's pastor in his father's church. But he knew he had a destiny to fulfill and, at the age of 28, he set off to find it.

Cooley moved to Nashville, Tennessee, and began working at Christ Church as an assistant music minister. Two years later, he left Christ Church to become a studio musician and an independent producer. In the fall of 1994, Lindell Cooley visited Brownsville Assembly and met with Pastor John Kilpatrick. In February 1995, Kilpatrick needed a music minister and said Lindell was God's choice for the position. After initially turning down the job, Cooley accepted and arrived in April 1995. Two months later, while Lindell was away on a missions trip to Ukraine, a historic revival began. When Lindell returned to Brownsville, he was instrumental in creating the music and songs that became associated with the unusual move of God. His style of musical leadership during the Brownsville Revival would inform the following generation to a significant degree.

After 10 years as music minister for the Brownsville Revival, In January 2004, Lindell moved back to Nashville and began to plant Grace Church: Nashville.

== Personal life ==
As of 2015, Cooley currently resides in Franklin, Tennessee, with his wife Amber and two sons, Samuel and Isaac.

== Discography ==
Album	Track Listing	Details
Brownsville Worship: Volume One	1. The Lord Almighty Reigns; 2. Enemy's Camp/Look What the Lord Has Done; 3. Pour Out My Heart; 4. Spirit Of the Sovereign Lord/Awesome God; 5. We Will Ride; 6. New Every Morning; 7. Healing Word; 8. Holy Love; 9. Will You Worship; 10. Take A Little Time	Publish Date: 1996; Label: Music Missions International
Brownsville Worship: Volume Two	1. Creation Calls; 2. There Must Be More; 3. Let Your Glory Fall; 4. Draw Me Close; 5. His Love Endures Forever; 6. Nobody Else Like You; 7. You Are Worthy of My Praise; 8. O For A Thousand Tongues; 9. We Will Dance	Publish Date: 1996; Label: Music Missions International
Winds of Worship 7	1. The Lord Almighty Reigns; 2. In The Secret; 3. Holy Love; 4. Let The River Flow; 5. Draw Me Close; 6. One Thing I Ask; 7. He Set Me Free; 8. How Priceless; 9. I See The Lord; 10. Satisfied With You	Publish Date: 1996; Label: Vineyard Music
Brownsville Worship: Awake America	1. We've Come to Praise Him; 2. Can You See The Lamb; 3. The Happy Song; 4. Holy and Anointed One; 5. Jesus, Lover of My Soul; 6. Let It Rain, We Will Ride; 7. Kingdom Celebration; 8. My God Is Real; 9. The Blood Medley; 10. All Your Promises; 11. Blessed Be Thy Name; 12. All Hail the Power	Publish Date: 1996; Label: Music Missions International
Brownsville Worship: Live From Pensacola	1. Lift Up Your Hands; 2. More Of Your Glory; 3. What A Friend We Have in Jesus/Leave It There/Can't Nobody; 4. Lift Up Holy Hands; 5. "Kyrie" (Lord Have Mercy); 6. What A Friend I've Found; 7. Every Move I Make; 8. History Maker; 9. Come To Me; 10. I've Been Delivered/I'm So Glad Jesus Set Me Free	Publish Date: 1998; Label: Music Missions International
Brownsville Worship: Send The Fire	1. Come, Come, Come; 2. Saved; 3. Send The Fire; 4. And Can It Be; 5. I Need You More; 6. The Spirit and the Bride; 7. Enemy's Camp/Look What The Lord Has Done; 8. When The Music Fades; 9. All I Want; 10. You Are in Control; 11. Glory, Glory Hallelujah	Publish Date: 1998; Label: Music Missions International
Songs From The Great Revivals	1. And Can It Be; 2. Be Thou My Vision; 3. Guide Me, O Thou Great Jehovah; 4. Fill Me Now; 5. There'll Be No Dark Valley/How Marvelous How Wonderful; 6. Lion Of Judah; 7. Send The Fire; 8. Here Is Love; 9. Love Lifted Me; 10. O Sacred Head, Now Wounded	Publish Date: 1998; Label: Music Missions International
Desperate For You	1. O Magnify The Lord With Me; 2. Stand Up On Your Feet; 3. Holy Is The Lord; 4. Arise Oh Lord; 5. Come Holy Spirit; 6. Lord I Love You; 7. Crowns Down; 8. Gotta Serve Somebody; 9. His Blood Washed Me; 10. I Don't Know Why; 11. Breathe/Send You Rain	Publish Date: 1999; Label: Music Missions International
The Brownsville Revival: Songs and Stories	1. Lift Up Your Hands; 2. Pour Out My Heart; 3. We Will Ride; 4. There's Nobody Else Like You; 5. Medley: Enemy's Camp/Look What the Lord Has Done/Can You Believe What the Lord Has Done; 6. The Happy Song; 7. Can You See the Lamb; 8. All I Want; 9. History Maker; 10. Be Thou My Vision; 11. Guide Me, Oh Thou Great Jehovah; 12. And Can It Be; 13. Love Lifted Me; 14. You Are In Control; 15. I Need You More; 16. Send The Fire; 17. The Spirit and the Bride	Publish Date: 1999; Label: Music Missions International
Quiet Songs for Time Alone with God: Volume One – Prayer	1. Sweet Hour Of Prayer; 2. Love Of God; 3. I Need Thee; 4. Have Thine Own Way; 5. Mystery; 6. Come to Me; 7. O Come, O Come; 8. I Need You More; 9. I Believe in You	Publish Date: 2000; Label: Music Missions International
Open Up The Sky	1. Open Up The Sky; 2. That's My Lord; 3. This Love; 4. Your Mercy Goes Much Deeper; 5. Day After Day; 6. Oil of Your Spirit; 7. Faith in You; 8. Love Came Down; 9. It's Time; 10. I Give My Heart To You; 11. Great Is He	Publish Date: 2001; Label: Integrity Music
Freedom	1. I'm Reaching Out; 2. Rain Down; 3. Revelation Song; 4. There Is A River; 5. Freedom; 6. Sing Hallelujah; 7. Come Down; 8. I Will Bless the Lord; 9. King of Glory; 10. Waiting to Be Wanted; 11. You're the Best Thing That Ever Happened to Me	Publish Date: 2007; Label: Music Missions International
Encounter Worship One	1. Your Throne; 2. Let Your Kingdom Come; 3. More; 4. Look My Way; 5. Every Nation; 6. Healing in Your Glory; 7. It's Like Rivers; 8. Dance With Me; 9. Haven't You Been Good; 10. Who Will Ascend; 11. When He Returns; 12. There's a Lifting	Publish Date: 2007; Label: Music Missions International
Encounter Worship Two	1. I Will Bless the Lord at All Times; 2. Glorious; 3. Highest Praise; 4. I See the Lord; 5. Faintly; 6. Are You Ready; 7. Glorify Your name 8. A Word of Intercession; 9. I Love Your Presence; 10. Magnificent and Holy; 11. We All Bow Down; 12. Freedom; 13. Hold to God's Unchanging Hand	Publish Date: 2007; Label: Music Missions International
Revival at Brownsville	1. We've Come To Praise Him; 2. Enemy's Camp; 3. Can You Believe; 4. Look What the Lord Has Done; 5. Revival Fire Fall; 6. We Will Ride; 7. We Shall See The King; 8. Holy, Holy, Holy; 9. More of Your Glory; 10. The Lord Reigns; 11. New Every Morning; 12. Spirit of the Sovereign God; 13. Awesome God; 14. I Need You More; 15. Take a Little Time	Publish Date: 1996/2010; Label: Integrity Music
Encounter Worship Three	1. Joy; 2. King; 3. Set Me on Fire; 4. Solid Rock; 5. All the Way; 6. This is Love; 7. Exalt the Lord; 8. Excellent Lord; 9. Sing to the King	Publish Date: 2010; Label: Music Missions International
Encounter Worship Four: Now Is The Time	1. Give Thanks; 2. Now Is the Time; 3. You Are Great; 4. Jesus Paid it All; 5. How He Loves; 6. I Love You, Jesus; 7. Do It, Lord; 8. Gotta Bow Down; 9. More Than a Friend; 10. High and Exalted; 11. How Can I Keep From Singing	Publish Date: 2011; Label: Music Missions International
