= Dunksburg, Missouri =

Unincorporated community in Missouri, U.S.

Coordinates: 38°53′57″N 93°29′52″W

Dunksburg is an unincorporated community in Johnson and Pettis counties, in the U.S. state of Missouri.

== History ==
Dunksburg was originally called Dunkley's Store, and under the latter name was founded in 1858, and named after B. F. Dunkley, a local merchant. A post office called Dunksburg was established in 1890, and remained in operation until 1904.
