= Smithton, Missouri =

City in Pettis County, Missouri, United States

- City
- City of Smithton
- Location of Smithton, Missouri
- Coordinates: 38°40′52″N 93°05′35″W
- Country: United States
- State: Missouri
- County: Pettis

Government
  - Mayor: Damian Lemens

Area
  - Total: 0.30 sq mi (0.78 km^{2})
  - Land: 0.30 sq mi (0.78 km^{2})
  - Water: 0 sq mi (0.00 km^{2})
- Elevation: 873 ft (266 m)

Population (2020)
  - Total: 506
  - Density: 1,681.9/sq mi (649.39/km^{2})
- Time zone: UTC-6 (Central (CST))
  - Summer (DST): UTC-5 (CDT)
- ZIP code: 65350
- Area code: 660
- FIPS code: 29-68384
- GNIS feature ID: 2395902

Smithton is a city in Pettis County, Missouri, United States. As of the 2020 census, Smithton had a population of 506.

== History ==
Smithton was platted in 1859. It was named for Gen. George R. Smith, a railroad promoter, or for General Thomas A. Smith.

== Geography ==
According to the United States Census Bureau, the city has a total area of 0.30 square miles (0.78 km^{2}), all land.

== Demographics ==
Historical population
Census	Pop.	Note	%±
1870	309		—
1880	307		−0.6%
1890	369		20.2%
1900	420		13.8%
1910	346		−17.6%
1920	331		−4.3%
1930	340		2.7%
1940	404		18.8%
1950	339		−16.1%
1960	395		16.5%
1970	402		1.8%
1980	559		39.1%
1990	532		−4.8%
2000	510		−4.1%
2010	570		11.8%
2020	506		−11.2%
U.S. Decennial Census

=== 2010 census ===
At the census of 2010, there were 570 people, 206 households, and 151 families residing in the city. The population density was 1,900.0 inhabitants per square mile (733.6/km^{2}). There were 224 housing units at an average density of 746.7 per square mile (288.3/km^{2}). The racial makeup of the city was 94.9% White, 1.4% African American, 0.2% Native American, 0.2% Asian, 1.6% from other races, and 1.8% from two or more races. Hispanic or Latino of any race were 2.6% of the population.

There were 206 households, of which 43.2% had children under the age of 18 living with them, 53.4% were married couples living together, 17.0% had a female householder with no husband present, 2.9% had a male householder with no wife present, and 26.7% were non-families. 19.9% of all households were made up of individuals, and 5.9% had someone living alone who was 65 years of age or older. The average household size was 2.70 and the average family size was 3.13.

The median age in the city was 33.5 years. 32.6% of residents were under the age of 18; 7.6% were between the ages of 18 and 24; 27.9% were from 25 to 44; 22.4% were from 45 to 64; and 9.5% were 65 years of age or older. The gender makeup of the city was 48.2% male and 51.8% female.

=== 2000 census ===
In 2000, the population density was 1/4 people per square mile (679.0/km^{2}). There were 212 housing units at an average density of 728.0 per square mile (281.1/km^{2}). The racial makeup of the city was 97.45% White, 0.78% Native American, 0.20% Asian, 0.39% from other races, and 1.18% from two or more races. Hispanic or Latino of any race were 0.59% of the population.

In the 2,000 houses in Smithton 99.9% that had children under the age of 18 living in them. Of these 53.4% were married couples living together, 19.0% had a female householder with no husband present, 4.3% were male householders with no wife present, and 23.3% were non-families. 20.1% of all households were made up of individuals, and 9.5% had someone living alone who was 65 years of age or older. The average household size was 2.70 and the average family size was 3.08.

In the city the population was spread out, with 32.7% under the age of 18, 8.0% from 18 to 24, 29.4% from 25 to 44, 19.4% from 45 to 64, and 10.4% who were 65 years of age or older. The median age of a smithton resident is 33 years old. For every 100 females age 18 and over, there were 91.6 males.

The median income for a household in the city was $32,321, and the median income for a family was $38,125. Males had a median income of $27,303 versus $20,125 for females. The per capita income for the city was $16,320. About 5.5% of families and 6.3% of the population were below the poverty line, including 9.7% of those under age 18 and of those age 65 or over.

== Education ==
- Smithton High School
- Smithton Revival

== See also ==
- List of cities in Missouri
