= Smithton Revival =

The Smithton Revival (also known as the Smithton Outpouring or the Cornfield Revival) was a Pentecostal Christian revival meeting that occurred in the small town (population 532 at the time) of Smithton, Missouri, from March 24, 1996, to April 2000. A small congregation of about 180 people, Smithton Community Church, hosted steady crowds for three years resulting in over 250,000 visitors.

== History ==
The revival began in March 1996 when Pastor Steve Gray, the pastor of Smithton Community Church, was experiencing a personal crisis. Having pastored for 13 years in this small town, Gray was ready to quit due to discouragement over some aggressive, and possibly undeserved, criticism. The church was relatively successful for the town size, but Gray believed he had reached his limit of talent and emotional strength.

The revival began during a Sunday night church service after Gray had spent two weeks away, mostly in solitude, but also attending some services at the Brownsville Revival in Pensacola, Florida, where he received some inspiration and hope. Upon entering the front door to the sanctuary, Gray felt electrified by the "lightnings of God" and began jumping up and down. The congregation reacted to the moment by taking off their shoes and going to the front of the church in celebration, seeing that their pastor was touched somehow.

After the revival began, visitors began to attend the church from the local region, then people came from all 50 states, and eventually 50 other countries including Singapore, Australia, France, Germany, Israel, and Japan. The church ran six services per week and often had 600–1000 visitors.

In 2000, the congregation moved to Kansas City. It is reported that the church size was about 300 at that time and it is said 85 percent of the families made the move. Commenting on the reasons for the move, Pastors Steve and Kathy Gray felt "the town's 532 residents had grown weary of revival crowds that outnumbered the town's population and where recharged Christians and new believers found few ministry opportunities." A Christianity Today article "Smithton Revival: Revival's Relocation Pits Pastor Against Alienated Followers" reported..."Five and a half years after revival marked by twirling and jumping broke out in rural Missouri at the Smithton Community Church (SCC), its pastor and two-thirds of the congregation have relaunched their revival at the new World Revival Church (WRC) in the more populous Kansas City. But some members who stayed behind in Smithton feel disillusioned and are disturbed because they have lost their church. 'We wanted more of God, says Jerry Spencer, 56, a former lay leader of the defunct SCC. Unfortunately, we surrendered our lives to a movement and a man's revival.'" (OCTOBER 1, 2001) " Kansas City provided an opportunity for people who wanted to join the congregation to find jobs and housing. Edith Blumhofer, director of Wheaton College's Institute for the Study of American Evangelicals, says the revival's relocation is surprising in its scale. "People who jump at a religious movement with enthusiasm do what it takes to be fully immersed in it," she says, "but for a whole church body to move is unusual, especially from a rural to urban setting."

The congregation in Kansas City was called World Revival Church until a name change to Revive KC in 2022. Pastors Steve and Kathy Gray lead the church. The congregation is about 700–1000 members.

== Music ==
In addition to other CDs, an original music CD of the Smithton Outpouring was recorded by Integrity Hosanna and released in August 1999, called, “The Smithton Outpouring - Revival From the Heartland”.
