= Steve Hill (evangelist) =

American pastor

Reverend Steve Hill (January 17, 1954 – March 9, 2014) was an American Christian clergyman and evangelist. He is best known as the evangelist who preached in what became known as the Brownsville Revival. It was a series of meetings at Brownsville Assembly of God in Pensacola, Florida that began on Father's Day, 1995 and continued for five years.

In 2000, Hill moved to the Dallas/Fort Worth area in Texas to resume traveling evangelism. In 2003, he founded Heartland Family Church in the Las Colinas section of Irving, Texas, a suburb of Dallas.

== Early life ==
Hill was born in Ankara to a military family. As a young man he was arrested for drug trafficking; he then met a Lutheran pastor who led him to become a Christian. He was placed on the Teen Challenge rehabilitation programme, and after completing the programme, he joined the Teen Challenge staff.

== Ministry and revival ==
Hill graduated from a two-year ministry training school run by Teen Challenge founder David Wilkerson. From there, he served on the staff with Outreach Ministries of Alabama, then as a youth pastor at several churches in Florida. In the mid-1980s, he and his wife Jeri became missionaries, holding crusades and planting churches in Argentina, Spain, and the former Soviet Union. Early in 1995, Hill went to London, England where a revival was happening at Holy Trinity Brompton Anglican Church.

The revival began on what is popularly known as the Pensacola Outpouring. Some congregants at the service spoke of the presence of "a mighty wind" that blew through the church. This account rapidly spread across the Pentecostal community, but gained little attention in the mainstream media. The revival was heavily covered in the media, in such publications as Time, Newsweek, New York Times and on 60 Minutes and 20/20.

Hill preached several revival services each week for the next five years.

The Hills left Brownsville in 2000 and founded the Heartland World Ministries in Dallas.

== Death ==
Stephen Hill died on March 9, 2014, from cancer. His son Ryan died in October 2014.
