= Jesse Creek =

Stream in the U.S. state of Missouri

Jesse Creek is a stream in Audrain and Callaway counties in the U.S. state of Missouri. It is a tributary of Beaverdam Creek.

The stream headwaters arise in northern Audrain County at 39°02′46″N 91°55′37″W and it generally east until crossing under US Route 54 approximately two miles north of Auxvasse where it turns to the north. It flows generally north to northeast entering Callaway County and its confluence with Beaverdam Creek at 39°04′27″N 91°52′54″W.

Jesse Creek has the name of Scott Jesse, an early settler.
