= Blake Grupe =

American football player (born 1998)

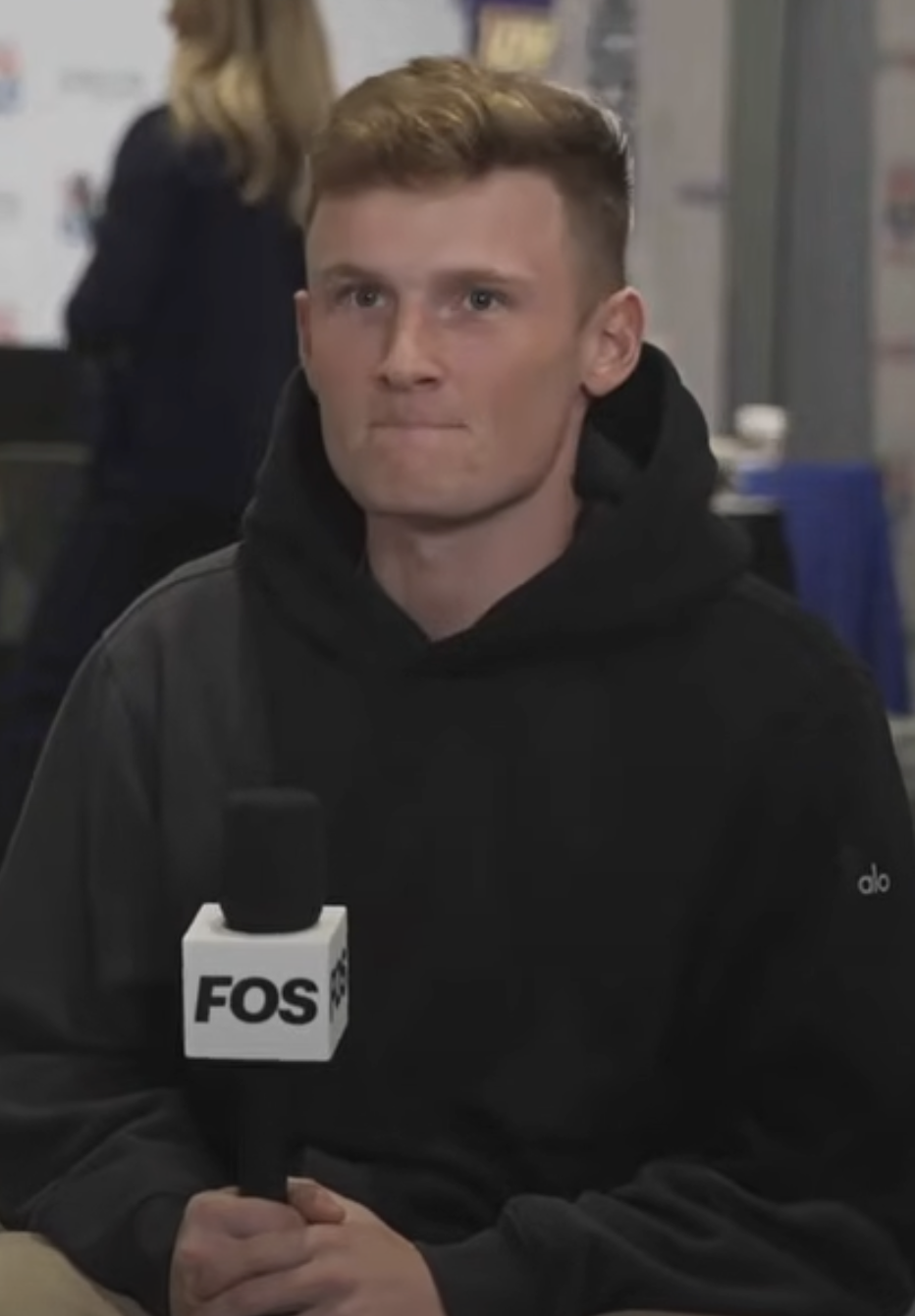
- Grupe in 2025

Los Angeles Rams
- Position: Placekicker
- Roster status: Injured reserve

Personal information
- Born: November 5, 1998 (age 28); Sedalia, Missouri, U.S.
- Listed height: 5 ft 7 in (1.70 m)
- Listed weight: 156 lb (71 kg)

Career information
- High school: Smith-Cotton (Sedalia)
- College: Arkansas State (2017–2021); Notre Dame (2022)
- NFL draft: 2023: undrafted

Career history
- New Orleans Saints (2023–2025); Indianapolis Colts (2025); New York Jets (2026)*; Los Angeles Rams (2026–present)
- * Offseason or practice squad member only

Awards and highlights
- First-team All-Sun Belt (2019); Second-team All-Sun Belt (2021)

Career NFL statistics as of 2026
- Field goals attempted: 106
- Field goals made: 87
- Field goal %: 82.1%
- Longest field goal: 60
- Extra points attempted: 98
- Extra points made: 96
- Points scored: 357
- Stats at Pro Football Reference

Blake Robert Grupe (GROOP-ee; born November 5, 1998) is an American professional football placekicker for the Los Angeles Rams of the National Football League (NFL). He played college football for the Arkansas State Red Wolves and the Notre Dame Fighting Irish before being signed by the New Orleans Saints as an undrafted free agent after the 2023 NFL draft. Grupe has also been a member of the Indianapolis Colts and New York Jets.

== Early life ==
Blake Grupe was born on November 5, 1998. He attended Smith-Cotton High School in Sedalia, Missouri, and was a three-sport athlete, playing soccer, baseball and football, although he did not begin playing football until his sophomore year. As a senior, he was named all-state in both football and soccer, setting the school's records for single-season and career field goals made. He committed to play college football for the Arkansas State Red Wolves.

== College career ==
As a true freshman at Arkansas State in 2017, Grupe redshirted. The following year, he earned the starting placekicking job in week three and finished the season having converted 14 of 21 attempts, placing seventh in the Sun Belt Conference. In 2019, Grupe made 19 of 22 field goal attempts and was named first-team all-conference as well as a semifinalist for the Lou Groza Award as best placekicker nationally; his 110 total points scored set a school record for kickers and was second-best in the conference, additionally being the 13th-best total in the United States.

In 2020, Grupe went 11-of-18 on field goals and made 43 extra points. In his final year at Arkansas State, 2021, he made 20 of 25 field goals and all but one of his 32 extra point attempts. He holds several school records, including career extra points made (162), career field goals made (64) and career points scored (354). Grupe transferred to Notre Dame for his final season of eligibility in 2022. He went 14-of-19 on field goals and made all 49 of his extra point attempts in his lone year with the team.

== Professional career ==
Pre-draft measurables
Height	Weight	Arm length	Hand span	Wingspan
5 ft 6 7/8 in (1.70 m)	152 lb (69 kg)	27 3/4 in (0.70 m)	8 5/8 in (0.22 m)	5 ft 6 3/8 in (1.69 m)
All values from Pro Day

=== New Orleans Saints ===
After going unselected in the 2023 NFL draft, Grupe was signed by the New Orleans Saints as an undrafted free agent. In the first preseason game, he made the game-winning field goal against the Kansas City Chiefs. He competed with veteran Wil Lutz for a spot on the team and won the position battle.

In Week 3 of the 2023 season, Grupe missed a 46-yard go-ahead field goal against the Green Bay Packers, resulting in a Saints loss. In Week 5, Grupe was named NFC Special Teams Player of the Week after completing four extra points, two 50+ yard field goals, and recording five touchbacks on seven kickoffs in a 34–0 win over the New England Patriots. As a rookie, he converted all 40 extra point attempts and 30 of 37 field goal attempts. In the 2024 season, Grupe converted 31 of 33 extra point attempts and 27 of 31 field goal attempts.

Grupe struggled during the 2025 season, missing a league-high eight field goal attempts through Week 12, including making only 5 of 11 attempts past 40 yards. On November 25, 2025, Grupe was released by the New Orleans Saints.

=== Indianapolis Colts ===
On December 2, 2025, Grupe signed with the Indianapolis Colts' practice squad. He was signed to the active roster on December 10. In Week 15, against the Seattle Seahawks, Grupe kicked a go-ahead 60-yard field goal with 40 seconds left, however, the Colts would go on to lose 18–16. Grupe beat the longest field goal in Colts history which was 58 yards, kicked by Dan Miller in 1982.

On March 16, 2026, Grupe re-signed with the Colts on a one-year, $1.4 million contract. He was waived by Indianapolis as a part of final roster cuts on August 30.

=== New York Jets ===
On August 31, 2026, Grupe was claimed off of waivers by the New York Jets. On September 29, 2026, he was waived and re-signed to the practice squad two days later.

=== Los Angeles Rams ===
On October 13, 2026, Grupe was signed by the Los Angeles Rams off the Jets' practice squad after the Rams released Harrison Mevis. Grupe made his Rams debut on October 18 against the Arizona Cardinals, converting a 44-yard field goal on his only attempt before leaving the game in the first quarter with an injury suffered on the ensuing kickoff. He was placed on the injured reserve on October 19 after it was discovered that he had torn his ACL.

== Career statistics ==
Legend
**Bold**	Career high

=== NFL ===
General			Field goals					PATs			Kickoffs			Points
Season	Team	GP	FGM	FGA	FG%	Blck	Long	XPM	XPA	XP%	KO	Avg	TBs	Pts
2023	NO	17	**30**	**37**	81.1	0	55	**40**	**40**	**100**	**91**	**64**	**76**	**130**
2024	NO	17	27	31	87.1	**1**	57	31	33	93.9	78	63.8	21	112
2025	NO	11	18	26	69.2	0	54	15	15	**100**	43	60.7	9	69
2025	IND	5	11	11	**100**	0	**60**	10	10	**100**	27	61.4	1	43
2026	LAR	1	1	1	**100**	0	44	0	0	---	1	58.0	0	3
Total		51	87	106	82.1	1	60	96	98	98.0	240	63.0	107	357

=== College ===
Year	Team	GP	Overall FGs				PATs			Total points
Year	Team	GP	Lng	FGA	FGM	Pct	XPA	XPM	Pct	Total points
2017	Arkansas State	0	DNP							
2018	Arkansas State	11	47	21	14	66.7	38	35	92.1	77
2019	Arkansas State	13	46	22	19	**86.4**	**54**	**53**	98.1	**110**
2020	Arkansas State	11	42	18	11	61.1	45	43	95.6	76
2021	Arkansas State	12	**50**	**25**	**20**	80.0	32	31	96.9	91
2022	Notre Dame	13	47	19	14	73.7	49	49	**100.0**	91
Career		60	50	105	78	74.3	218	211	96.8	445
