= Manila, Missouri =

Unincorporated community in Missouri, U.S.

Coordinates: 38°33′04″N 93°20′11″W

Manila is an unincorporated community in southern Pettis County, in the U.S. state of Missouri.

The community is on Missouri Route E one mile north of Missouri Route 52 and three miles north of the Pettis-Benton county line. Sedalia is approximately eleven miles to the north-northeast.

== History ==
A post office called Manila was established in 1898, and remained in operation until 1904. The community takes its name from the Philippine capital of Manila.
