= Sedalia School District 200 =

School district in Missouri, United States

Sedalia School District 200 is a school district headquartered in Sedalia, Missouri.

It covers the vast majority of the Sedalia city limits. The district covers portions of Cedar, Flat Creek, Lake Creek, Longwood, Prairie, Sedalia, Smithton, and Washington townships.

Steve Triplett, who was superintendent, retired on June 30, 2022. Todd Fraley replaced him as superintendent.

== Schools ==
High schools

- Smith-Cotton High School (comprehensive)
- Whittier High School (alternative)

Junior high schools

- Smith-Cotton Junior High School

Middle schools

- Sedalia Middle School

Elementary schools

- Heber Hunt Elementary School
- Horace Mann Elementary School
- Parkview Elementary School
- Skyline Elementary School
- Washington Elementary School

Preschools

- Loftus Early Childhood Center
