= Revival meeting =

Series of Christian religious services

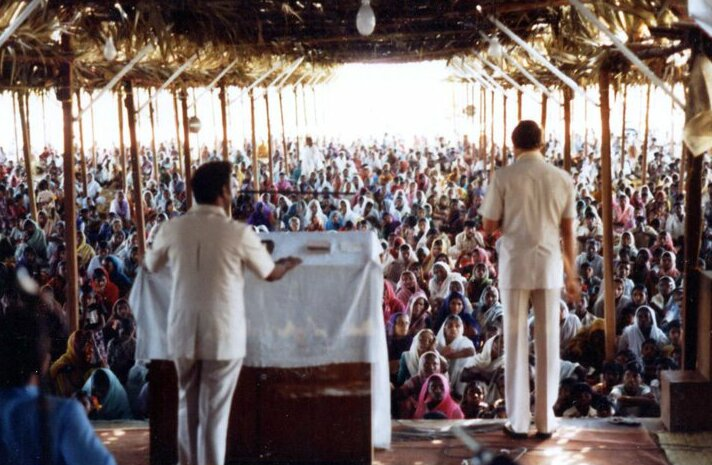
Revival meeting in India

A revival meeting is a series of Christian religious services held to inspire active members of a church body to gain new converts and to call sinners to repent. Those who lead revival services are known as revivalists (or evangelists). Nineteenth-century Baptist preacher Charles Spurgeon said, "Many blessings may come to the unconverted in consequence of a revival among Christians, but the revival itself has to do only with those who already possess spiritual life." These meetings are usually conducted by churches or missionary organizations throughout the world. Notable historic revival meetings were conducted in the United States by evangelist Billy Sunday and in Wales by evangelist Evan Roberts. Revival services occur in local churches, brush arbor revivals, tent revivals, and camp meetings.

== Meetings ==
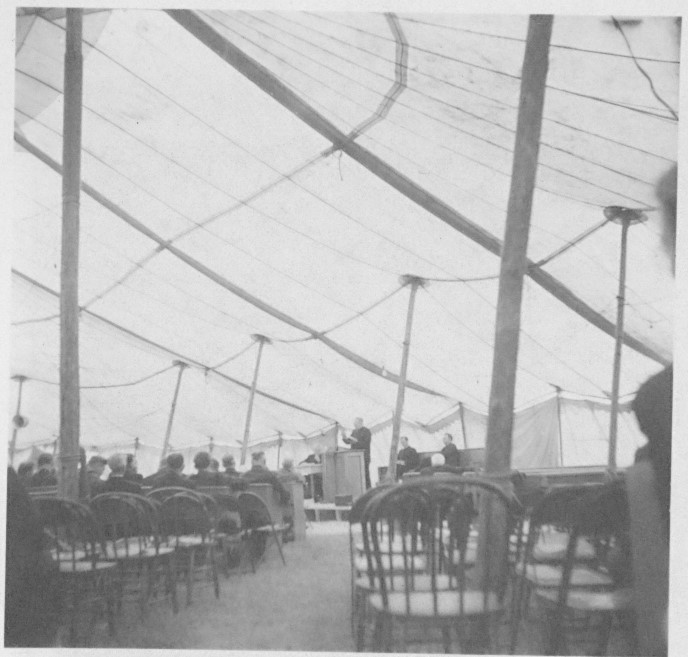
Mennonite conference in 1947

A revival meeting usually consists of several consecutive nights of services conducted at the same time and location, most often the building belonging to the sponsoring congregation but sometimes a rented assembly hall, for more adequate space, to provide a setting that is more comfortable for non-Christians, or to reach a community where there are no churches. Tents were very frequently employed in this effort in the recent past, and occasionally still are, but less so due to the difficulties in heating and cooling them and otherwise making them comfortable, an increasing consideration with modern audiences.

Ben M. Bogard, from 1909 to 1914, conducted revivals full-time in seven southern states. In 1924, he founded the American Baptist Association (ABA), the Missionary Baptist denomination, still based in Texarkana, Texas. ABA churches have traditionally held revivals usually once or twice a year.

The length of such meetings varies. Until the last quarter-century they were frequently a week or more in duration, especially in the Southern United States. Currently they may be held for three or four days. Evangelist Billy Graham planned a week-long crusade in New York City, which ultimately extended from May 15 to September 1, 1957. More than two million people went to New York's Madison Square Garden to hear him preach.

Most groups holding revival meetings tend to be of a conservative or fundamentalist nature, although some are still held by mainline groups, which formerly conducted them with a far greater frequency. Similar events may be referred to as "crusades", most especially those formerly held by Billy Graham and Oral Roberts.

Along with camp meetings, the holding of revival services is an integral part of the Methodist tradition, in which they serve to offer individuals the New Birth (first work of grace) and entire sanctification (second work of grace), along with calling backsliders to repentance. Revival services are often held for a week at least once a year in Methodist churches.

Conservative Mennonites continue to hold and promote protracted revival meetings of usually seven or eight days duration at least once per year in a given congregation. The visiting evangelist is chosen from among their own or related congregations.

Many revivals are conducted by nondenominational community churches, most of which are conservative in theology.

== Influence ==
In her book God Gave Rock and Roll to You: A History of Contemporary Christian Music, historian Leah Payne draws a connection between 19th and 20th-century revivals and the creation and culture of contemporary Christian music in the latter 20th century, with music playing a key part in revivals. Payne writes that revival meetings were "in many ways, the rock concerts of the early twentieth century." James D. Vaughn and his publishing company sold a number of songbooks at revival events, helping to shape a sort of celebrity culture. Multiple Protestant denominations began to set their theological differences aside and found shared commonality as consumers of revival songbooks. Revival music also featured similar themes to later contemporary Christian music, including a focus on Christian youth as the nation's future; temperance; longing for conceptions of traditional religious, patriotic, and cultural beliefs; and rejection of evolution (brought into the public consciousness through the well-known Scopes trial).

== In popular culture ==
This movement has been portrayed by director Richard Brooks in his 1960 film Elmer Gantry with Burt Lancaster (who received the Academy Award for this film) and Jean Simmons, adapted from Sinclair Lewis' eponymous novel.

The Stephen King novel, Revival, features a major character who is a revival meeting faith healer.

There is a revival scene in the 1997 film The Apostle, starring Robert Duvall. Duvall's portrayal of an evangelical minister earned him an Academy Award for Best Actor nomination.

Cormac McCarthy's novel Blood Meridian begins with a scene set at a revival meeting.

The Academy Award-winning documentary Marjoe reviews the career of child-evangelist Marjoe Gortner, giving a behind-the-scenes look at revivals he promoted as an adult.

Neil Diamond's Brother Love's Traveling Salvation Show depicts a revival meeting.

The music video for OneRepublic's "Counting Stars" depicts a Christian revival meeting.

Laura Ingalls Wilder's Little Town on the Prairie depicts a week of revival meetings at the Congregational church in De Smet, South Dakota.

Remembrances of revival-meetings attended as a youth were the inspiration for the second movement of Charles Ives' Orchestral Set No. 2, The Rockstrewn Hills Join in the People's Outdoor Meeting.

== See also ==
- Camp meeting
- Charles Grandison Finney
- Christian revival
- New York Crusade (1957)
- Smithton Revival
- Tabernacle (Methodist)
- Tent revival
