= Beaver Dam Creek (South Dakota) =

Stream in Meade County, United States of America

Coordinates: 44°45′08″N 102°17′21″W

Beaver Dam Creek is a stream in the U.S. state of South Dakota.

Beaver Dam Creek contained several beaver dams, hence the name.

== See also ==
- List of rivers of South Dakota
