= Bahner (surname) =

Bahner is a German surname. Notable people with the surname include:

- Dietrich Bahner (1939–2009), German politician
- Klaus Bahner (1937–2011), German field hockey player
- Kristin Bahner (born 1972), American politician
- Ludvik Bahner (1891–1971), Czech painter and photographer
- Siegfried Bahner, German football manager
