= Smith-Cotton High School =

Location
- 2010 Tiger Pride Boulevard; Sedalia, Missouri 65301; United States; 38°40′21″N 93°15′28″W

Information
- Type: Public
- Established: 1925
- School district: Sedalia 200 School District
- Principal: Wade Norton
- Teaching staff: 88.04 (FTE)
- Grades: 9–12
- Student to teacher ratio: 17.44
- Campus: rural
- Colors: Black and Gold
- Athletics conference: Central Missouri Activities Conference
- Team name: Tigers
- Accreditation: Missouri Department of Elementary and Secondary Education
- Newspaper: Tiger Times
- Yearbook: Archives
- Website: schs.sedalia200.org

Smith-Cotton High School is a public high school in Sedalia, Missouri, in the United States. The school serves students in grades 9–12 in the Sedalia 200 School District. The current principal is Wade Norton. Athletic teams are known as the Tigers and Lady Tigers, and the school colors are black and gold.

== History ==
SCHS was named after Sarah Smith Cotton, a prominent member of the early Sedalia community. The land on which one of her previous houses stood was used for the original building. The first year of consolidated grade 9-12 education at SCHS was the 1925-1926 school year. An approved 1946 referendum brought a gymnasium/cafeteria and additional classrooms.

== Athletics ==
Smith-Cotton features a variety of sports, featuring Football, Basketball, Baseball, Softball, Volleyball, and Track. Smith-Cotton formerly competed in the West Central Conference but later was a founding member in the Central Missouri Activities Conference.

State Championships
Sport	Year(s)
Softball	2000, 2001
Wrestling (boys)	1989, 1996

== Extracurricular activities ==
Smith-Cotton has a competitive FIRST Robotics Competition team, "Team SCREAM".

The school also has a Junior Reserve Officer Training Corps (JROTC), known as Tiger Battalion.

== Performing arts ==
SCHS has a competitive dance team, "High Voltage".

Smith-Cotton has a competitive marching band, "Tiger Pride", and hosts an annual competition, the Smith-Cotton Marching Invitational.

The school, once again, has 3 competition show choirs. The Varsity Mixed "New Score", the Varsity Soprano/Alto "Cabaret", and the JV Mixed "Broadway Velocity". New Score was started in 1972, Cabaret in 1990, and Broadway Velocity in 2012. Cabaret was retired in 2018, but brought back in 2025. Broadway Velocity, which has also been known as Vocal Velocity, was retired in 2022, but was brought back in 2024. The current director is SCHS class of 2017 alum, Avery Mather. Mather was also a member of New Score from 2014-2017. In the 2025 season, his first year as director, he brought New Score to its first Grand Championship since 2015 at Rock Bridge High. Mather was also awarded "Rookie Director of the Year" by Homeroom Show Choir for 2025. New Score Singers won national-level competitions in 1996 and 1997. The program also hosts an annual competition, the Show Me Classic.

== Notable alumni ==
- Kim Anderson, basketball player
- Blake Grupe, football player
- Bud Thomas, baseball player
- Leroy Van Dyke, country singer
