= Bahner, Missouri =

- Unincorporated community
- Location within Missouri
- Coordinates: 38°34′10″N 93°07′43″W
- Country: United States
- State: Missouri
- County: Pettis
- Elevation: 886 ft (270 m)
- Time zone: UTC-6 (Central (CST))
  - Summer (DST): UTC-5 (CDT)
- Area code: 660
- GNIS feature ID: 713536

Bahner is an unincorporated community in Pettis County, Missouri, United States.

== History ==
A post office called Bahner was established in 1882 which remained in operation until 1907. Edward Bahner, an early postmaster, most likely gave the community his name.
