= Spring Fork (Missouri) =

Stream in the American state of Missouri

Coordinates: 38.655573°N 93.242706°W

Spring Fork is a tributary of Flat Creek in the U.S. state of Missouri, in Benton and Pettis Counties.

Spring Fork was so named because it is fed by a spring in its headwaters.

== See also ==
- List of rivers of Missouri
