= Beaverdam Creek (Salt River tributary) =

Stream in Missouri, U.S.

Beaverdam Creek is a stream in southwest Audrain County in the U.S. state of Missouri. It is a tributary of the South Fork of the Salt River which it joins approximately six miles southeast of Mexico.

The stream headwaters arise in southwest Audrian County at 39°05′10″N 92°02′24″W at an elevation of approximately 910 feet. The stream flows generally east to southeast and passes under US Route 54 approximately 5.5 miles south of Mexico and joins the South Fork two miles east of Route 54 and about 1.5 miles north of the southern border of Audrain County at 39°04′56″N 91°51′05″W and an elevation of 761 feet.

Beaverdam Creek was named for the beaver dams along its course.

== Tributaries ==
- Jesse Creek

== See also ==
- List of rivers of Missouri
