= Newland, Missouri =

- Unincorporated community
- Interactive map of Newland, Missouri
- Coordinates: 38°48′34″N 93°10′24″W
- Country: United States
- State: Missouri
- County: Pettis
- Elevation: 676 ft (206 m)
- Time zone: UTC-6 (Central (CST))
  - Summer (DST): UTC-5 (CDT)
- GNIS feature ID: 741102

Newland is an unincorporated community in northeast Pettis County, in the U.S. state of Missouri. The community is on Missouri Route EE approximately eight miles northeast of Sedalia.

A post office called Newland was established in 1892, and remained in operation until 1902. The community has the name of Judge William Henry Newland, a pioneer citizen.
