= Beaverdam Creek (Duck River tributary) =

Stream in Hickman County, Tennessee, U.S.

Coordinates: 35.816455°N 87.637242°W

Beaverdam Creek is a stream in Hickman County, Tennessee, in the United States. It is a tributary of Duck River.

Beaverdam Creek was named on account of the remains of a beaver dam found in the creek by pioneer settlers.

== See also ==
- List of rivers of Tennessee
