= Elk Fork (South Grand River tributary) =

Stream in Bates County, Missouri, U.S.

Coordinates: 38.45085°N 94.14328°W

Elk Fork is a stream in Bates County in the U.S. state of Missouri. It is a tributary of South Grand River.

Elk Fork was so named on account of elk in the area.

== See also ==
- List of rivers of Missouri
