= Longwood, Missouri =

- Unincorporated community
- Location within Missouri
- Coordinates: 38°53′57″N 93°10′12″W
- Country: United States
- State: Missouri
- County: Pettis
- Elevation: 801 ft (244 m)
- Time zone: UTC-6 (Central (CST))
  - Summer (DST): UTC-5 (CDT)
- Area code: 660
- GNIS feature ID: 729770

Longwood (also Hermantown or Oak Grove) is an unincorporated community in northeast Pettis County, Missouri, United States. It is located on Missouri Route BB approximately two miles east of US Route 65 and thirteen miles north of Sedalia.

A post office called Longwood was established in 1837, and remained in operation until 1957. The community was named after Longwood, Saint Helena, the location of Napoleon's second exile from 1815 until his death in 1821.
