= La Monte, Missouri =

City in Pettis County, Missouri, United States

- City
- City of La Monte
- Location of La Monte, Missouri
- Coordinates: 38°46′21″N 93°25′25″W
- Country: United States
- State: Missouri
- County: Pettis

Area
  - Total: 1.10 sq mi (2.84 km^{2})
  - Land: 1.08 sq mi (2.81 km^{2})
  - Water: 0.012 sq mi (0.03 km^{2})
- Elevation: 846 ft (258 m)

Population (2020)
  - Total: 1,014
  - Density: 934.6/sq mi (360.85/km^{2})
- Time zone: UTC-6 (Central (CST))
  - Summer (DST): UTC-5 (CDT)
- ZIP code: 65337
- Area code: 660
- FIPS code: 29-40520
- GNIS feature ID: 2395567
- Website: lamonte-mo.com

La Monte is a city in Pettis County, Missouri, United States. As of the 2020 census, La Monte had a population of 1,014.

== History ==
La Monte was originally called Boomer, and under the latter name was platted in 1866. The present name of La Monte, after an acquaintance of an early postmaster, was adopted in 1870 when the railroad was extended through the neighborhood.

== Geography ==
La Monte is located on Missouri Route 127 just north of US Route 50 eleven miles northwest of Sedalia. Knob Noster is six miles west in adjacent Johnson County.

According to the United States Census Bureau, the city has a total area of 1.14 square miles (2.95 km^{2}), of which 1.13 square miles (2.93 km^{2}) is land and 0.01 square miles (0.03 km^{2}) is water.

== Demographics ==
Historical population
| Census | Pop. | Note | %± |
|---|---|---|---|
| 1870 | 184 | | — |
| 1880 | 396 | | 115.2% |
| 1890 | 638 | | 61.1% |
| 1940 | 491 | | — |
| 1950 | 502 | | 2.2% |
| 1960 | 801 | | 59.6% |
| 1970 | 814 | | 1.6% |
| 1980 | 1,054 | | 29.5% |
| 1990 | 995 | | −5.6% |
| 2000 | 1,064 | | 6.9% |
| 2010 | 1,140 | | 7.1% |
| 2020 | 1,014 | | −11.1% |
U.S. Decennial Census

=== 2010 census ===
As of the census of 2010, there were 1,140 people, 399 households, and 263 families living in the city. The population density was 1,008.8 inhabitants per square mile (389.5/km^{2}). There were 456 housing units at an average density of 403.5 per square mile (155.8/km^{2}). The racial makeup of the city was 72.6% White, 0.4% African American, 0.1% Native American, 0.4% Asian, 0.2% Pacific Islander, 22.2% from other races, and 4.1% from two or more races. Hispanic or Latino of any race were 35.8% of the population.

There were 399 households, of which 43.1% had children under the age of 18 living with them, 49.6% were married couples living together, 10.3% had a female householder with no husband present, 6.0% had a male householder with no wife present, and 34.1% were non-families. 27.1% of all households were made up of individuals, and 13.3% had someone living alone who was 65 years of age or older. The average household size was 2.85 and the average family size was 3.53.

The median age in the city was 30.2 years. 30.4% of residents were under the age of 18; 9.8% were between the ages of 18 and 24; 27.8% were from 25 to 44; 20.5% were from 45 to 64; and 11.5% were 65 years of age or older. The gender makeup of the city was 48.9% male and 51.1% female.

=== 2000 census ===
As of the census of 2000, there were 1,064 people, 411 households, and 283 families living in the city. The population density was 932.2 inhabitants per square mile (359.9/km^{2}). There were 468 housing units at an average density of 410.0 per square mile (158.3/km^{2}). The racial makeup of the city was 87.22% White, 1.22% African American, 0.19% Native American, 0.75% Asian, 0.66% Pacific Islander, 7.99% from other races, and 1.97% from two or more races. Hispanic or Latino of any race were 12.97% of the population.

There were 411 households, out of which 34.3% had children under the age of 18 living with them, 56.0% were married couples living together, 8.5% had a female householder with no husband present, and 31.1% were non-families. 26.3% of all households were made up of individuals, and 11.7% had someone living alone who was 65 years of age or older. The average household size was 2.57 and the average family size was 3.08.

In the city the population was spread out, with 25.8% under the age of 18, 10.9% from 18 to 24, 30.5% from 25 to 44, 18.6% from 45 to 64, and 14.1% who were 65 years of age or older. The median age was 34 years. For every 100 females there were 98.1 males.

The median income for a household in the city was $28,688, and the median income for a family was $35,125. Males had a median income of $23,889 versus $19,118 for females. The per capita income for the city was $13,153. About 15.3% of families and 21.4% of the population were below the poverty line, including 29.1% of those under age 18 and 14.3% of those age 65 or over.

== Education ==
LaMonte Elementary and High School is the home of the Vikings and the school colors are black and gold.

== See also ==
- List of cities in Missouri
