= Missouri Route 127 =

State highway in Missouri, U.S.

Route 127
- MO 127 highlighted in red

Route information
- Maintained by MoDOT
- Length: 50.436 mi (81.169 km)

Major junctions
- South end: Route 52 near Windsor
- US 50 in La Monte; I-70 / US 40 in Sweet Springs
- North end: US 65 in Malta Bend

Location
- Country: United States
- State: Missouri

Highway system
- Missouri State Highway System; Interstate; US; State; Supplemental
← Route 126	→ Route 128

Route 127 is a highway in central Missouri. Its northern terminus is at U.S. Route 65 west of Malta Bend; its southern terminus is at Route 52 southwest of Sedalia.

== Major intersections ==
County	Location	mi	km	Destinations	Notes
Pettis	Green Ridge Township	0.000	0.000	Route 52	
Pettis	La Monte	17.034	27.414	US 50 – Warrensburg, Sedalia	
Saline	Sweet Springs	34.084	54.853	I-70 / US 40 – Columbia, Kansas City	
Saline	Elmwood Township	42.884	69.015	Route 20 west	Southern end of Route 20 overlap
Saline	Elmwood Township	43.886	70.628	Route 20 east – Marshall	Northern end of Route 20 overlap
Saline	Grand Pass Township	50.436	81.169	US 65	
1.000 mi = 1.609 km; 1.000 km = 0.621 mi: Concurrency terminus
