= Pettis County, Missouri =

County in Missouri, United States

- County
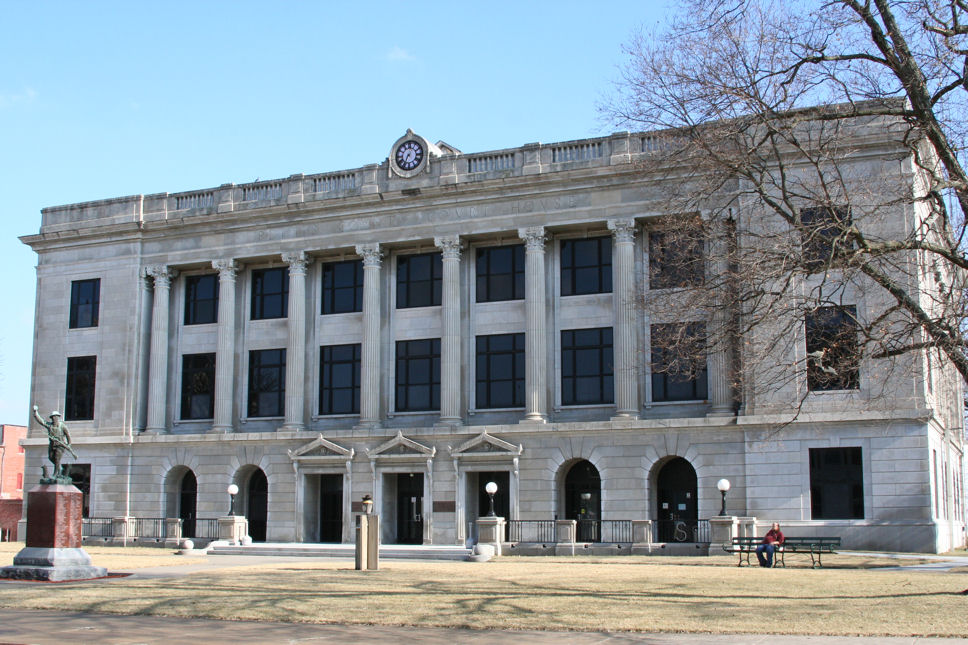
- The Pettis County Courthouse in Sedalia

- Location within the U.S. state of Missouri
- Coordinates: 38°44′N 93°17′W
- Country: United States
- State: Missouri
- Founded: January 24, 1833
- Named for: Spencer Darwin Pettis
- Seat: Sedalia
- Largest city: Sedalia

Area
  - Total: 686 sq mi (1,780 km^{2})
  - Land: 682 sq mi (1,770 km^{2})
  - Water: 4.0 sq mi (10 km^{2}) 0.6%

Population (2020)
  - Total: 42,980
  - Estimate (2025): 44,254 ▲
  - Density: 63.0/sq mi (24.3/km^{2})
- Time zone: UTC−6 (Central)
  - Summer (DST): UTC−5 (CDT)
- Congressional district: 4th
- Website: pettiscomo.gov

Pettis County is a county located in west central U.S. state of Missouri. As of the 2020 census, the population was 42,980. Its county seat is Sedalia. The county was organized on January 24, 1833, and named after former U.S. Representative Spencer Darwin Pettis. Pettis County comprises the Sedalia, MO Micropolitan Statistical Area. The county is home to the site of the Missouri State Fair in Sedalia.

== Geography ==
According to the U.S. Census Bureau, the county has a total area of 686 square miles (1,780 km^{2}), of which 682 square miles (1,770 km^{2}) is land and 4.0 square miles (10 km^{2}) (0.6%) is water. It is drained by the Lamine River and branches.

=== Adjacent counties ===
- Saline County (north)
- Cooper County (east)
- Morgan County (southeast)
- Benton County (south)
- Henry County (southwest)
- Johnson County (west)
- Lafayette County (northwest)

=== Major highways ===
- U.S. Route 50
- U.S. Route 65
- Route 52
- Route 127
- Route 135
- Route 765

== Demographics ==
Historical population
Census	Pop.	Note	%±
1840	2,930		—
1850	5,150		75.8%
1860	9,392		82.4%
1870	18,706		99.2%
1880	27,271		45.8%
1890	31,151		14.2%
1900	32,438		4.1%
1910	33,913		4.5%
1920	35,813		5.6%
1930	34,664		−3.2%
1940	33,336		−3.8%
1950	31,577		−5.3%
1960	35,120		11.2%
1970	34,137		−2.8%
1980	36,378		6.6%
1990	35,437		−2.6%
2000	39,403		11.2%
2010	42,201		7.1%
2020	42,980		1.8%
2025 (est.)	44,254	▲	3.0%
U.S. Decennial Census; 1790–1960 1900–1990; 1990–2000 2010

=== 2020 census ===
As of the 2020 census, the county had a population of 42,980. The median age was 37.9 years. 25.1% of residents were under the age of 18 and 17.2% of residents were 65 years of age or older. For every 100 females there were 99.4 males, and for every 100 females age 18 and over there were 96.2 males age 18 and over.

The racial makeup of the county was 82.6% White, 3.2% Black or African American, 0.6% American Indian and Alaska Native, 0.7% Asian, 0.3% Native Hawaiian and Pacific Islander, 5.0% from some other race, and 7.6% from two or more races. Hispanic or Latino residents of any race comprised 9.3% of the population.

Pettis County, Missouri – Racial and ethnic composition Note: the US Census treats Hispanic/Latino as an ethnic category. This table excludes Latinos from the racial categories and assigns them to a separate category. Hispanics/Latinos may be of any race.
Race / Ethnicity (NH = Non-Hispanic)	Pop 1980	Pop 1990	Pop 2000	Pop 2010	Pop 2020	% 1980	% 1990	% 2000	% 2010	% 2020
White alone (NH)	34,591	33,781	35,810	36,701	34,751	95.09%	95.33%	90.88%	86.97%	80.85%
Black or African American alone (NH)	1,374	1,164	1,181	1,244	1,353	3.78%	3.28%	3.00%	2.95%	3.15%
Native American or Alaska Native alone (NH)	87	96	130	137	159	0.24%	0.27%	0.33%	0.32%	0.37%
Asian alone (NH)	88	114	154	247	294	0.24%	0.32%	0.39%	0.59%	0.68%
Native Hawaiian or Pacific Islander alone (NH)	x	x	18	30	120	x	x	0.05%	0.07%	0.28%
Other race alone (NH)	15	14	45	41	119	0.04%	0.04%	0.11%	0.10%	0.28%
Mixed race or Multiracial (NH)	x	x	538	755	2,168	x	x	1.37%	1.79%	5.04%
Hispanic or Latino (any race)	223	268	1,527	3,046	4,016	0.61%	0.76%	3.88%	7.22%	9.34%
Total	36,378	35,437	39,403	42,201	42,980	100.00%	100.00%	100.00%	100.00%	100.00%

60.6% of residents lived in urban areas, while 39.4% lived in rural areas.

There were 16,588 households in the county, of which 31.5% had children under the age of 18 living with them and 25.9% had a female householder with no spouse or partner present. About 29.0% of all households were made up of individuals and 13.1% had someone living alone who was 65 years of age or older.

There were 18,563 housing units, of which 10.6% were vacant. Among occupied housing units, 67.2% were owner-occupied and 32.8% were renter-occupied. The homeowner vacancy rate was 2.1% and the rental vacancy rate was 10.4%.

=== 2000 census ===
Per the 2000 census, there were 39,403 people, 15,568 households, and 10,570 families residing in the county. The population density was 58 people per square mile (22 people/km^{2}). There were 16,963 housing units at an average density of 25 units per square mile (9.7/km^{2}). The racial makeup of the county was 92.06% White, 3.04% Black or African American, 0.38% Native American, 0.39% Asian, 0.05% Pacific Islander, 2.46% from other races, and 1.62% from two or more races. Approximately 3.88% of the population were Hispanic or Latino of any race.

There were 15,568 households, out of which 32.50% had children under the age of 18 living with them, 53.30% were married couples living together, 10.50% had a female householder with no husband present, and 32.10% were non-families. 27.00% of all households were made up of individuals, and 11.70% had someone living alone who was 65 years of age or older. The average household size was 2.49 and the average family size was 3.01.

In the county, the population was spread out, with 26.30% under the age of 18, 9.30% from 18 to 24, 27.90% from 25 to 44, 21.10% from 45 to 64, and 15.40% who were 65 years of age or older. The median age was 36 years. For every 100 females there were 94.40 males. For every 100 females age 18 and over, there were 91.70 males.

The median income for a household in the county was $31,822, and the median income for a family was $38,073. Males had a median income of $29,221 versus $19,554 for females. The per capita income for the county was $16,251. About 10.20% of families and 12.80% of the population were below the poverty line, including 16.60% of those under age 18 and 10.50% of those age 65 or over.

== Education ==
This is a list of K-12 school districts with any amount of area in the county:

- Cole Camp R-I School District
- Green Ridge R-VIII School District
- Henry County R-I School District
- Knob Noster R-VIII School District
- La Monte R-IV School District
- Pettis County R-V School District
- Pilot Grove C-4 School District
- Sedalia 200 School District
- Smithton R-VI School District
- Sweet Springs R-VII School District

There is one elementary school district, Pettis County R-XII School District.

=== Public schools ===
- Green Ridge R-VIII School District – Green Ridge
  - Green Ridge Elementary School (K-06)
  - Green Ridge High School (07-12)
- La Monte R-IV School District – La Monte
  - La Monte Elementary School (PK-06)
  - La Monte High School (07-12)
- Pettis County R-V School District – Hughesville
  - Northwest Elementary School (K-06)
  - Northwest High School (07-12)
- Pettis County R-XII School District – Sedalia
  - Pettis County Elementary School (PK-08)
- Sedalia School District No. 200] – Sedalia
  - Sedalia Early Childhood Education Center (PK)
  - Heber Hunt Elementary School (K-04)
  - Skyline Elementary School (K-04)
  - Parkview Elementary School (K-04)
  - Horace Mann Elementary School (K-04)
  - Washington Elementary School (K-04)
  - Sedalia Middle School (05)
  - Smith-Cotton Junior High School (06-08)
  - Smith-Cotton High School (9-12)
- Smithton School District – Smithton
  - Smithton Elementary School (PK-06)
  - Smithton High School (07-12)

=== Private schools ===
- St. Paul's Lutheran School – Sedalia (PK-08) – Lutheran
- Sedalia Seventh-day Adventist School – Sedalia (01-08) – Seventh-day Adventist
- Show-Me Christian School – La Monte (K-12) – Nondenominational Christian
- Applewood Christian School – Sedalia (K-12) – Nondenominational Christian
- Sacred Heart Schools – Sedalia (K-12) – Roman Catholic
  - Sacred Heart Elementary School (K-06)
  - Sacred Heart High School (07-12)

=== Post-secondary ===
- State Fair Community College – Sedalia – A public, two-year/community college.

=== Public libraries ===
- Boonslick Regional Library
- Sedalia Public Library

== Government and politics ==
=== Local ===
The Republican Party predominantly controls politics at the local level in Pettis County. Republicans currently hold all of the elected positions in the county.

Pettis County, Missouri

Elected countywide officials
Assessor	Christopher Woolery	Republican
Auditor	Beverly Dillon	Republican
Circuit Clerk	Susan Sadler	Republican
County Clerk	Megan Page	Republican
Collector	Marsha L. Boeschen	Republican
Commissioner (presiding)	Bill Taylor	Republican
Commissioner (district 1)	Israel Baeza	Republican
Commissioner (district 2)	Mark Edwards	Republican
Coroner	Robert “Skip” Smith Jr.	Republican
Prosecuting Attorney	Tony Farkas	Republican
Public Administrator	Brandy Arnett	Republican
Recorder	Barbara Clevenger	Republican
Sheriff	Brad Anders	Republican
Surveyor	Vacant	N/A
Treasurer	Kim Lyne	Republican

=== State ===
==== Gubernatorial ====
Past Gubernatorial Elections Results
Year	Republican	Democratic	Third Parties
2024	74.16% 13,873	23.71% 4,436	2.13% 397
2020	71.85% 13,645	25.68% 4,876	2.47% 470
2016	61.95% 11,150	34.90% 6,281	3.14% 566
2012	47.32% 8,073	49.77% 8,490	2.91% 498
2008	42.55% 7,660	54.63% 9,834	2.82% 507
2004	57.30% 10,038	41.63% 7,293	1.06% 186
2000	54.65% 8,536	42.85% 6,692	2.50% 390
1996	44.63% 6,804	51.51% 7,853	3.86% 589

==== Missouri House of Representatives ====
Pettis County is divided into four legislative districts in the Missouri House of Representatives, all of which are held by Republicans.

- District 48 — Dave Muntzel (R-Boonville). Consists of the community of Smithton and the northeast section of the county.

Missouri House of Representatives — District 48 — Pettis County (2016)
Party	Candidate	Votes	%	±%
Republican	Dave Muntzel	1,327	84.74%	−15.26
Independent	Debra Dilks	239	15.26%	+15.26

Missouri House of Representatives — District 48 — Pettis County (2014)
Party	Candidate	Votes	%	±%
Republican	Dave Muntzel	751	100.00%	+23.18

Missouri House of Representatives — District 48 — Pettis County (2012)
Party	Candidate	Votes	%	±%
Republican	Dave Muntzel	1,160	76.82%	
Democratic	Ron Monnig	350	23.18%	

- District 51 — Dean Dohrman (R-La Monte). Consists of the communities of Houstonia, Hughesville, and La Monte and the northwest portion of the county.

Missouri House of Representatives — District 51 — Pettis County (2016)
Party	Candidate	Votes	%	±%
Republican	Dean Dohrman	1,345	81.86%	+3.76
Democratic	John Cozort	298	18.14%	+0.94

Missouri House of Representatives — District 51 — Pettis County (2014)
Party	Candidate	Votes	%	±%
Republican	Dean Dorhman	781	78.10%	+3.91
Democratic	Gary L. Grigsby	172	17.20%	−5.31
Libertarian	Bill Wayne	47	4.70%	

Missouri House of Representatives — District 51 — Pettis County (2012)
Party	Candidate	Votes	%	±%
Republican	Dean Dohrman	1,190	74.19%	
Democratic	Gary L. Grigsby	361	22.51%	
Libertarian	Bill Wayne	53	3.30%	

- District 52 — Nathan Beard (R-Sedalia). Consists of the community of Sedalia.

Missouri House of Representatives — District 52 — Pettis County (2016)
Party	Candidate	Votes	%	±%
Republican	Nathan Beard	8,449	70.58%	−29.42
Democratic	Kyle Garner	3,521	29.42%	+29.42

Missouri House of Representatives — District 52 — Pettis County (2014)
Party	Candidate	Votes	%	±%
Republican	Nathan Beard	5,200	100.00%	+38.24

Missouri House of Representatives — District 52 — Pettis County (2012)
Party	Candidate	Votes	%	±%
Republican	Stanley Cox	7,012	61.76%	
Democratic	Phyllis Sue Domann	4,342	38.24%	

- District 54 — Dan Houx (R-Warrensburg). Consists of the community of Green Ridge and the southern portion of the county.

Missouri House of Representatives — District 54 — Pettis County (2016)
Party	Candidate	Votes	%	±%
Republican	Dan Houx	1,784	71.62%	−15.22
Democratic	Bob Gregory	549	22.04%	+22.04
Libertarian	Steve Daugherty	158	6.34%	+6.34

Missouri House of Representatives — District 54 — Pettis County (2014)
Party	Candidate	Votes	%	±%
Republican	Denny Hoskins	1,142	86.84%	+17.33
Constitution	Daniel Plemmons	173	13.16%	+13.16

Missouri House of Representatives — District 54 — Pettis County (2012)
Party	Candidate	Votes	%	±%
Republican	Denny Hoskins	1,589	69.51%	
Democratic	Nancy Maxwell	626	27.38%	
Independent	Eddie Osobrne	71	3.11%	

==== Missouri Senate ====
All of Pettis County is a part of Missouri's 28th District in the Missouri Senate and was previously represented by Mike Parson but the seat is currently vacant.

Missouri Senate — District 28 — Pettis County (2014)
Party	Candidate	Votes	%	±%
Republican	Mike Parson	7,943	100.00%	

=== Federal ===
==== US Senate ====
U.S. President — Missouri — Pettis County (2016)
Party	Candidate	Votes	%	±%
Republican	Donald J. Trump	12,792	70.9%	
Democratic	Hillary Clinton	4,322	24.0%	
Libertarian	Gary Johnson	733	4.1%	
Green	Jill Stein	112	0.6%	

U.S. Senate — Missouri — Pettis County (2016)
Party	Candidate	Votes	%	±%
Republican	Roy Blunt	10,361	57.59%	+15.12
Democratic	Jason Kander	6,657	37.00%	−11.67
Libertarian	Jonathan Dine	538	2.99%	−5.86
Green	Johnathan McFarland	251	1.40%	+1.40
Constitution	Fred Ryman	184	1.02%	+1.02

U.S. Senate — Missouri — Pettis County (2012)
Party	Candidate	Votes	%	±%
Republican	Todd Akin	7,196	42.47%	
Democratic	Claire McCaskill	8,246	48.67%	
Libertarian	Jonathan Dine	1,500	8.85%	

==== Missouri House of Representatives ====
All of Pettis County is included in Missouri's 4th Congressional District and is currently represented by Vicky Hartzler (R-Harrisonville) in the U.S. House of Representatives.

U.S. House of Representatives — Missouri's 4th Congressional District — Pettis County (2016)
Party	Candidate	Votes	%	±%
Republican	Vicky Hartzler	12,636	71.05%	−0.94
Democratic	Gordon Christensen	4,211	23.68%	+1.26
Libertarian	Mark Bliss	938	5.27%	−0.32

U.S. House of Representatives — Missouri's 4th Congressional District — Pettis County (2014)
Party	Candidate	Votes	%	±%
Republican	Vicky Hartzler	6,718	71.99%	+7.71
Democratic	Nate Irvin	2,092	22.42%	−9.12
Libertarian	Herschel L. Young	522	5.59%	+2.39

U.S. House of Representatives — Missouri’s 4th Congressional District — Pettis County (2012)
Party	Candidate	Votes	%	±%
Republican	Vicky Hartzler	10,781	64.28%	
Democratic	Teresa Hensley	5,290	31.54%	
Libertarian	Thomas Holbrook	537	3.20%	
Constitution	Greg Cowan	164	0.98%	

==== Presidential ====
United States presidential election results for Pettis County, Missouri
Year	Republican		Democratic		Third party(ies)	
Year	No.	%	No.	%	No.	%
1888	3,393	48.90%	3,369	48.56%	176	2.54%
1892	3,610	48.02%	3,680	48.95%	228	3.03%
1896	4,119	48.65%	4,267	50.40%	81	0.96%
1900	3,824	48.88%	3,820	48.82%	180	2.30%
1904	3,820	51.38%	3,346	45.00%	269	3.62%
1908	3,983	49.39%	3,791	47.01%	290	3.60%
1912	2,423	30.28%	3,771	47.12%	1,809	22.60%
1916	4,319	46.42%	4,665	50.13%	321	3.45%
1920	8,595	55.98%	6,561	42.73%	199	1.30%
1924	2,656	55.67%	1,826	38.27%	289	6.06%
1928	10,346	64.91%	5,554	34.85%	39	0.24%
1932	5,982	38.48%	9,474	60.95%	89	0.57%
1936	7,435	44.20%	9,265	55.08%	121	0.72%
1940	8,905	50.91%	8,570	48.99%	17	0.10%
1944	7,696	51.67%	7,176	48.18%	22	0.15%
1948	6,657	44.18%	8,388	55.66%	24	0.16%
1952	9,261	55.67%	7,363	44.26%	12	0.07%
1956	8,766	55.30%	7,086	44.70%	0	0.00%
1960	9,066	56.44%	6,997	43.56%	0	0.00%
1964	5,409	37.57%	8,987	62.43%	0	0.00%
1968	6,738	46.08%	6,334	43.32%	1,549	10.59%
1972	10,065	66.74%	5,016	33.26%	0	0.00%
1976	7,344	48.01%	7,887	51.56%	65	0.42%
1980	8,833	55.76%	6,475	40.87%	533	3.36%
1984	10,991	67.00%	5,413	33.00%	0	0.00%
1988	9,648	63.47%	5,486	36.09%	66	0.43%
1992	6,823	41.43%	5,314	32.26%	4,333	26.31%
1996	7,336	48.06%	6,057	39.68%	1,872	12.26%
2000	9,533	60.51%	5,855	37.16%	367	2.33%
2004	11,603	66.32%	5,801	33.16%	92	0.53%
2008	11,018	60.32%	6,932	37.95%	315	1.72%
2012	10,842	63.13%	5,904	34.38%	429	2.50%
2016	12,810	70.37%	4,324	23.75%	1,070	5.88%
2020	13,854	72.55%	4,783	25.05%	460	2.41%
2024	13,907	73.65%	4,703	24.91%	272	1.44%

== Communities ==
=== Cities and Towns ===
- Green Ridge
- Houstonia
- Hughesville
- Ionia
- La Monte
- Sedalia (county seat)
- Smithton
- Windsor

=== Unincorporated communities ===
- Bahner
- Beaman
- Bryson
- Dresden
- Dunksburg
- Georgetown
- Longwood
- Manila
- Newland
- Postal
- Spring Fork
- Stokley
- Tedieville

== See also ==
- National Register of Historic Places listings in Pettis County, Missouri
