= Alba, Missouri =

- City
- Location within Jasper County and Missouri
- Coordinates: 37°14′14″N 94°25′03″W
- Country: United States
- State: Missouri
- County: Jasper
- Incorporated: 1902

Area
  - Total: 0.33 sq mi (0.85 km^{2})
  - Land: 0.33 sq mi (0.85 km^{2})
  - Water: 0 sq mi (0.00 km^{2})
- Elevation: 994 ft (303 m)

Population (2020)
  - Total: 544
  - Density: 1,655.2/sq mi (639.08/km^{2})
- Time zone: UTC-6 (Central (CST))
  - Summer (DST): UTC-5 (CDT)
- ZIP code: 64830
- Area code: 417
- FIPS code: 29-00496
- GNIS feature ID: 2393897

Alba is a city in Jasper County, Missouri, United States. The population was 544 at the 2020 census.

== History ==
Alba was platted in 1882. The first postmaster of the settlement gave the community his last name. A post office called Alba has been in operation since 1860.

== Geography ==
Alba is located is located between the Spring River and the North Fork Spring River approximately seven miles northwest of Carthage. Purcell is one mile to the west on Missouri Route D and Neck City is two miles to the northwest.

According to the United States Census Bureau, the city has a total area of 0.33 square miles (0.85 km^{2}), all land.

== Demographics ==
Historical population
Census	Pop.	Note	%±
1920	470		—
1930	354		−24.7%
1940	318		−10.2%
1950	352		10.7%
1960	336		−4.5%
1970	365		8.6%
1980	474		29.9%
1990	465		−1.9%
2000	588		26.5%
2010	555		−5.6%
2020	544		−2.0%
U.S. Decennial Census

Alba is part of the Joplin, Missouri Metropolitan Statistical Area.

=== 2010 census ===
As of the census of 2010, there were 555 people, 227 households, and 167 families living in the city. The population density was 1,681.8 inhabitants per square mile (649.3/km^{2}). There were 251 housing units at an average density of 760.6 per square mile (293.7/km^{2}). The racial makeup of the city was 94.4% White, 0.7% African American, 1.8% Native American, and 3.1% from two or more races. Hispanic or Latino of any race were 2.3% of the population.

There were 227 households, of which 40.1% had children under the age of 18 living with them, 51.1% were married couples living together, 16.3% had a female householder with no husband present, 6.2% had a male householder with no wife present, and 26.4% were non-families. 24.7% of all households were made up of individuals, and 9.7% had someone living alone who was 65 years of age or older. The average household size was 2.44 and the average family size was 2.84.

The median age in the city was 36.1 years. 25.9% of residents were under the age of 18; 7.5% were between the ages of 18 and 24; 28.9% were from 25 to 44; 24.5% were from 45 to 64; and 12.8% were 65 years of age or older. The gender makeup of the city was 47.7% male and 52.3% female.

=== 2000 census ===
As of the census of 2000, there were 588 people, 184 households, and 142 families living in the city. The population density was 1,796.2 inhabitants per square mile (693.5/km^{2}). There were 202 housing units at an average density of 617.1 per square mile (238.3/km^{2}). The racial makeup of the city was 94.39% White, 0.68% African American, 3.23% Native American, 0.34% Asian, 0.17% from other races, and 1.19% from two or more races. Hispanic or Latino of any race were 0.34% of the population.

There were 184 households, out of which 45.1% had children under the age of 18 living with them, 60.9% were married couples living together, 10.9% had a female householder with no husband present, and 22.8% were non-families. 19.0% of all households were made up of individuals, and 9.8% had someone living alone who was 65 years of age or older. The average household size was 2.83 and the average family size was 3.23.

In the city the population was spread out, with 29.8% under the age of 18, 15.5% from 18 to 24, 28.6% from 25 to 44, 19.4% from 45 to 64, and 6.8% who were 65 years of age or older. The median age was 29 years. For every 100 females, there were 90.9 males. For every 100 females age 18 and over, there were 79.6 males.

The median income for a household in the city was $30,333, and the median income for a family was $32,500. Males had a median income of $23,625 versus $16,364 for females. The per capita income for the city was $11,588. About 9.5% of families and 15.2% of the population were below the poverty line, including 18.2% of those under age 18 and 19.4% of those age 65 or over.

== Education ==
It is in the Webb City R-VII School District. Webb City High School is the district's comprehensive high school.

== Notable people ==
- Ken Boyer
- Clete Boyer
- Cloyd Boyer
