= Trystan Colon =

American football player (born 1998)

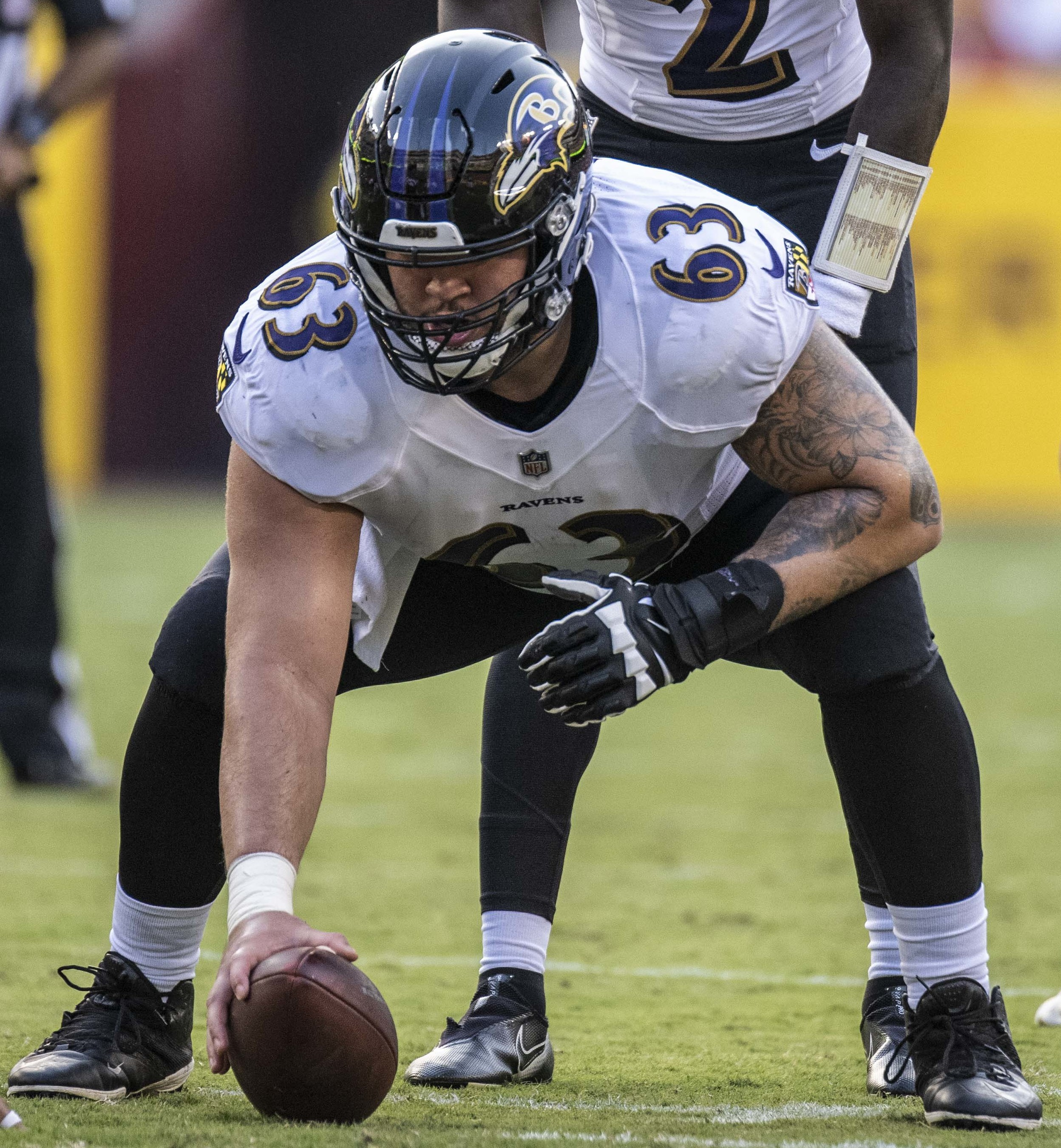
- Colon with the Baltimore Ravens in 2021

No. 63, 57
- Position: Center

Personal information
- Born: March 23, 1998 (age 28); Webb City, Missouri, U.S.
- Listed height: 6 ft 3 in (1.91 m)
- Listed weight: 317 lb (144 kg)

Career information
- High school: Webb City
- College: Missouri (2016–2019)
- NFL draft: 2020: undrafted

Career history
- Baltimore Ravens (2020–2022); New York Jets (2023)*; Arizona Cardinals (2023–2024); Detroit Lions (2025); Jacksonville Jaguars (2026)*
- * Offseason or practice squad member only

Awards and highlights
- Freshman All-SEC Team (2017)

Career NFL statistics
- Games played: 63
- Games started: 19
- Stats at Pro Football Reference

Trystan Colon (born March 23, 1998), formerly known as Trystan Colon-Castillo, is an American former professional football player who was a center in the National Football League (NFL). He played college football for the Missouri Tigers.

== Early life ==
Colon was born in Webb City, Missouri, to Heriberto and Neysa Rosaria Colon. His mother moved from Puerto Rico to go to college at Missouri Southern State University in Joplin and his father followed shortly after. His dad died in a motor vehicle accident in Joplin when Trystan was one year old.

He was a three-year varsity football player for the Webb City High School Cardinals, during the 2013 through 2015 seasons as an offensive lineman. He contributed to two class 4 state championship teams and one runner-up team, that tallied an overall record of 43–2, and included a 15–0 season in 2014. He also played basketball in high school.

== College career ==
He played college football at the University of Missouri. He earned the Tigers' Lifter of the Year after his redshirt season. Due to his success as a true freshman, Colon started 13 games the following year, making it onto the Southeastern Conference coaches' All-Freshman squad. He also was given the Team Underclassmen Leadership Award. He started the final 38 games of his three years playing after his redshirt year. He then started all 25 games for the Tigers in 2018 and 2019 but the team was ineligible to participate in a bowl game due to NCAA sanctions.

== Professional career ==
Pre-draft measurables
Height	Weight	Arm length	Hand span	Wingspan	Bench press
6 ft 3 in (1.91 m)	313 lb (142 kg)	30 1/2 in (0.77 m)	9 1/4 in (0.23 m)	6 ft 4 1/4 in (1.94 m)	11 reps
All values from NFL Combine

=== Baltimore Ravens ===
After not being selected in the 2020 NFL draft, Colon was signed as an undrafted free agent by the Baltimore Ravens. He was waived by Baltimore on September 5, 2020, and was re-signed to the practice squad the next day. Colon was elevated to the active roster on October 10, for the team's Week 5 game against the Cincinnati Bengals, and reverted to the practice squad after the game. He was promoted to the active roster on October 12, and made his first career start against the Pittsburgh Steelers on December 2, due in part to the Ravens' team-wide COVID-19 outbreak.

The Ravens placed an exclusive-rights free agent tender on Colon on March 10, 2021. He signed a one-year contract on April 18. The Ravens' announcement of this signing officially referred to him as Trystan Colon for the first time, per his request, and has remained the case since.

The Ravens placed an exclusive-rights free agent tender on Colon on March 9, 2022. He played a total of 20 games in his three seasons, 2020 through 2022, with the Ravens.

=== New York Jets ===
On March 22, 2023, Colon signed with the New York Jets. On August 29, Colon was waived by the Jets.

=== Arizona Cardinals ===
On August 30, 2023, Colon was claimed off waivers by the Arizona Cardinals. During the regular season, he played 14 games, four as a starter, most at left guard.

On March 11, 2024, Colon re–signed with the Cardinals on a $1.75 million, one-year contract.

=== Detroit Lions ===
On June 4, 2025, Colon signed with the Detroit Lions. He was released on August 26 as part of final roster cuts, and re-signed to the practice squad the next day. On September 16, Colon was promoted to the active roster. He made 12 appearances for Detroit during the regular season, including four starts. On January 3, 2026, Colon was placed on season-ending injured reserve due to a wrist injury.

=== Jacksonville Jaguars ===
On June 4, 2026, Colon signed with the Jacksonville Jaguars. He announced his retirement from professional football on August 4.
