= Oronogo, Missouri =

- City
- Location of Oronogo, Missouri
- Coordinates: 37°11′30″N 94°27′50″W
- Country: United States
- State: Missouri
- County: Jasper

Area
  - Total: 2.51 sq mi (6.51 km^{2})
  - Land: 2.49 sq mi (6.44 km^{2})
  - Water: 0.027 sq mi (0.07 km^{2})
- Elevation: 955 ft (291 m)

Population (2020)
  - Total: 2,558
  - Density: 1,029.1/sq mi (397.32/km^{2})
- Time zone: UTC-6 (Central (CST))
  - Summer (DST): UTC-5 (CDT)
- ZIP code: 64855
- Area code: 417
- FIPS code: 29-54920
- GNIS feature ID: 2396083
- Website: oronogomo.org

Oronogo is a city in Jasper County, Missouri, United States. The population was 2,558 at the 2020 census. It is part of the Joplin, Missouri Metropolitan Statistical Area.

== History ==
Oronogo was platted in 1856.

The name, according to local tradition, came about when it was found that the previous name, "Minersville" was already taken. At a public meeting to change the name, after considering many possibilities, a man in the back blurted out "its Ore or no go", referring to the mining operations. Elaborating on that, Colonel J. M. Young, suggested substituting the Spanish word "Oro" for ore, and the dropping the "or" to make the word euphonious. He pronounced it "Oronogo" and the audience accepted the name.

== Geography ==
According to the United States Census Bureau, the city has a total area of 2.52 square miles (6.53 km^{2}), of which 2.49 square miles (6.45 km^{2}) is land and 0.03 square miles (0.08 km^{2}) is water.

== Demographics ==
Historical population
Census	Pop.	Note	%±
1880	700		—
1890	994		42.0%
1900	2,073		108.6%
1910	1,912		−7.8%
1920	981		−48.7%
1930	551		−43.8%
1940	593		7.6%
1950	519		−12.5%
1960	513		−1.2%
1970	492		−4.1%
1980	525		6.7%
1990	595		13.3%
2000	976		64.0%
2010	2,381		144.0%
2020	2,558		7.4%
U.S. Decennial Census

=== 2020 census ===
As of the 2020 census, Oronogo had a population of 2,558. The median age was 30.9 years. 33.3% of residents were under the age of 18 and 8.9% of residents were 65 years of age or older. For every 100 females there were 97.1 males, and for every 100 females age 18 and over there were 94.6 males age 18 and over.

94.9% of residents lived in urban areas, while 5.1% lived in rural areas.

There were 847 households in Oronogo, of which 52.1% had children under the age of 18 living in them. Of all households, 62.5% were married-couple households, 12.3% were households with a male householder and no spouse or partner present, and 17.5% were households with a female householder and no spouse or partner present. About 13.3% of all households were made up of individuals and 4.9% had someone living alone who was 65 years of age or older.

There were 891 housing units, of which 4.9% were vacant. The homeowner vacancy rate was 2.1% and the rental vacancy rate was 8.1%.

Racial composition as of the 2020 census
Race	Number	Percent
White	2,213	86.5%
Black or African American	15	0.6%
American Indian and Alaska Native	46	1.8%
Asian	10	0.4%
Native Hawaiian and Other Pacific Islander	0	0.0%
Some other race	42	1.6%
Two or more races	232	9.1%
Hispanic or Latino (of any race)	123	4.8%

=== 2010 census ===
As of the census of 2010, there were 2,381 people, 772 households, and 646 families living in the city. The population density was 956.2 inhabitants per square mile (369.2/km^{2}). There were 821 housing units at an average density of 329.7 per square mile (127.3/km^{2}). The racial makeup of the city was 91.9% White, 0.3% African American, 2.0% Native American, 0.6% Asian, 1.4% from other races, and 3.8% from two or more races. Hispanic or Latino of any race were 4.0% of the population.

There were 772 households, of which 53.9% had children under the age of 18 living with them, 68.5% were married couples living together, 10.6% had a female householder with no husband present, 4.5% had a male householder with no wife present, and 16.3% were non-families. 12.4% of all households were made up of individuals, and 3.5% had someone living alone who was 65 years of age or older. The average household size was 3.08 and the average family size was 3.33.

The median age in the city was 29 years. 35.5% of residents were under the age of 18; 7.4% were between the ages of 18 and 24; 34.4% were from 25 to 44; 17% were from 45 to 64; and 5.7% were 65 years of age or older. The gender makeup of the city was 49.6% male and 50.4% female.

=== 2000 census ===
As of the census of 2000, there were 976 people, 350 households, and 263 families living in the city. The population density was 484.1 inhabitants per square mile (186.9/km^{2}). There were 403 housing units at an average density of 199.9 per square mile (77.2/km^{2}). The racial makeup of the city was 93.65% White, 2.05% Native American, 0.10% Asian, 0.92% from other races, and 3.28% from two or more races. Hispanic or Latino of any race were 1.74% of the population.

There were 350 households, out of which 40.9% had children under the age of 18 living with them, 63.4% were married couples living together, 9.1% had a female householder with no husband present, and 24.6% were non-families. 22.3% of all households were made up of individuals, and 7.1% had someone living alone who was 65 years of age or older. The average household size was 2.79 and the average family size was 3.25.

In the city the population was spread out, with 32.0% under the age of 18, 8.0% from 18 to 24, 30.7% from 25 to 44, 20.5% from 45 to 64, and 8.8% who were 65 years of age or older. The median age was 31 years. For every 100 females, there were 89.9 males. For every 100 females age 18 and over, there were 90.3 males.

The median income for a household in the city was $33,839, and the median income for a family was $36,339. Males had a median income of $27,250 versus $19,000 for females. The per capita income for the city was $11,626. About 15.5% of families and 19.4% of the population were below the poverty line, including 27.6% of those under age 18 and 24.4% of those age 65 or over.

== Education ==
It is in the Webb City R-VII School District. Webb City High School is the district's comprehensive high school.
