= Hugh Sprinkle =

American football player (1896–1961)

No. 17, 16
- Position: Tackle

Personal information
- Born: September 18, 1896; Everton, Missouri, U.S.
- Died: December 11, 1961 (aged 65); Fairmont, West Virginia, U.S.
- Listed height: 6 ft 2 in (1.88 m)
- Listed weight: 220 lb (100 kg)

Career information
- High school: Webb City (Webb City, Missouri)
- College: Carnegie Tech

Career history
- Akron Pros (1923–1924); Cleveland Bulldogs (1925)
- Stats at Pro Football Reference

Hubert Owen Sprinkle (September 18, 1896 – December 11, 1961) was an American professional football tackle who played three seasons in the National Football League (NFL) with the Akron Pros and Cleveland Bulldogs. Sprinkle played college football at the University of Missouri and Carnegie Institute of Technology.

== Early life and college ==
Hubert Owen Sprinkle was born on September 18, 1896, in Everton, Missouri. He attended Webb City High School in Webb City, Missouri.

Sprinkle was first a member of the Missouri Tigers of the University of Missouri. He then transferred to Carnegie Mellon University, where he was a three-year letterman for the Carnegie Tech Tartans from 1920 to 1922. In December 1922, he was named the football team captain for 1923. However, he did not play for them that year. In 1923, Sprinkle was part of the first class of Carnegie graduates to inscribe their initials on The Fence. He majored in electrical engineering at Carnegie Tech and was an honor student.

== Professional career ==
Sprinkle signed with the Akron Pros of the National Football League (NFL) in 1923. He played in two games for the team during the 1923 season. He became a free agent after the year and signed with the Pros again on September 15, 1924. Sprinkle appeared in five games, all starts, for the Pros before being released on November 3, 1924.

Sprinkle was signed by the Cleveland Bulldogs of the NFL in 1925. He played in seven games, starting six, during the 1925 season.

== Personal life ==
Sprinkle spent time as the head coach of the freshman football team at Carnegie Tech. He died on November 12, 1961, in Fairmont, West Virginia.
