= Airport Drive, Missouri =

- Village
- Village of Airport Drive
- Location of Airport_Drive, Missouri
- Coordinates: 37°08′26″N 94°30′58″W
- Country: United States
- State: Missouri
- County: Jasper
- Incorporated: 1947

Area
  - Total: 2.00 sq mi (5.19 km^{2})
  - Land: 2.00 sq mi (5.19 km^{2})
  - Water: 0 sq mi (0.00 km^{2})
- Elevation: 958 ft (292 m)

Population (2020)
  - Total: 766
  - Density: 382.3/sq mi (147.62/km^{2})
- Time zone: UTC-6 (Central (CST))
  - Summer (DST): UTC-5 (CDT)
- FIPS code: 29-00424
- GNIS feature ID: 2397919
- Website: www.airportdrivemo.com

Airport Drive is a village in Jasper County, Missouri, United States. The population was 766 at the 2020 census. It is part of the Joplin, Missouri Metropolitan Statistical Area. The community is still commonly referred to as "Stone's Corner," as the intersection of Route 43 and Route 171 is known.

== Geography ==
According to the United States Census Bureau, the village has a total area of 2.00 square miles (5.18 km^{2}), all land.

== Climate ==
Climate data for Airport Drive
Month	Jan	Feb	Mar	Apr	May	Jun	Jul	Aug	Sep	Oct	Nov	Dec	Year
Mean daily maximum °F (°C)	41 (5)	48 (9)	57 (14)	68 (20)	75 (24)	84 (29)	89 (32)	87 (31)	80 (27)	69 (21)	55 (13)	46 (8)	66 (19)
Mean daily minimum °F (°C)	24 (−4)	28 (−2)	35 (2)	46 (8)	55 (13)	64 (18)	68 (20)	66 (19)	59 (15)	48 (9)	35 (2)	28 (−2)	46 (8)
Average precipitation inches (mm)	1.8 (46)	2.3 (58)	3.3 (84)	4 (100)	4.7 (120)	5.4 (140)	3.1 (79)	3.9 (99)	5 (130)	3.7 (94)	3.2 (81)	2.6 (66)	42.9 (1,090)
Source: Weatherbase

== Demographics ==
Historical population
Census	Pop.	Note	%±
1950	225		—
1960	292		29.8%
1970	300		2.7%
1980	702		134.0%
1990	818		16.5%
2000	622		−24.0%
2010	698		12.2%
2020	766		9.7%
U.S. Decennial Census

=== 2010 census ===
As of the census of 2010, there were 698 people, 300 households, and 203 families living in the village. The population density was 349.0 inhabitants per square mile (134.7 inhabitants/km^{2}). There were 312 housing units at an average density of 156.0 units per square mile (60.2 units/km^{2}). The racial makeup of the village was 95.7% White, 1.7% Native American, 0.6% Asian, 0.1% from other races, and 1.9% from two or more races. Hispanic or Latino of any race were 3.4% of the population.

There were 300 households, of which 27.0% had children under the age of 18 living with them, 55.7% were married couples living together, 9.0% had a female householder with no husband present, 3.0% had a male householder with no wife present, and 32.3% were non-families. 26.7% of all households were made up of individuals, and 11.4% had someone living alone who was 65 years of age or older. The average household size was 2.33 and the average family size was 2.77.

The median age in the village was 43.6 years. 20.2% of residents were under the age of 18; 8.5% were between the ages of 18 and 24; 23.2% were from 25 to 44; 28.7% were from 45 to 64; and 19.3% were 65 years of age or older. The gender makeup of the village was 48.6% male and 51.4% female.

=== 2000 census ===
As of the census of 2000, there were 622 people, 248 households, and 176 families living in the village. The population density was 312.9 inhabitants per square mile (120.8 inhabitants/km^{2}). There were 270 housing units at an average density of 135.8 units per square mile (52.4 units/km^{2}). The racial makeup of the village was 93.41% White, 0.32% African American, 2.25% Native American, 0.48% Asian, 0.48% from other races, and 3.05% from two or more races. Hispanic or Latino of any race were 0.80% of the population.

There were 248 households, out of which 25.4% had children under the age of 18 living with them, 59.7% were married couples living together, 8.5% had a female householder with no husband present, and 29.0% were non-families. 23.0% of all households were made up of individuals, and 10.5% had someone living alone who was 65 years of age or older. The average household size was 2.40 and the average family size was 2.82.

In the village, the population was spread out, with 18.3% under the age of 18, 10.5% from 18 to 24, 21.4% from 25 to 44, 29.1% from 45 to 64, and 20.7% who were 65 years of age or older. The median age was 45 years. For every 100 females, there were 100.6 males. For every 100 females age 18 and over, there were 104.0 males.

The median income for a household in the village was $38,750, and the median income for a family was $42,083. Males had a median income of $34,167 versus $23,750 for females. The per capita income for the village was $19,678. About 3.9% of families and 6.8% of the population were below the poverty line, including 12.1% of those under age 18 and none of those age 65 or over.

== Education ==
Most of Airport Drive is in the Carl Junction R-I School District while an eastern portion is in the Webb City R-VII School District. Webb City High School is the Webb City district's comprehensive high school.
