= Zach Davidson =

American football player (born 1998)

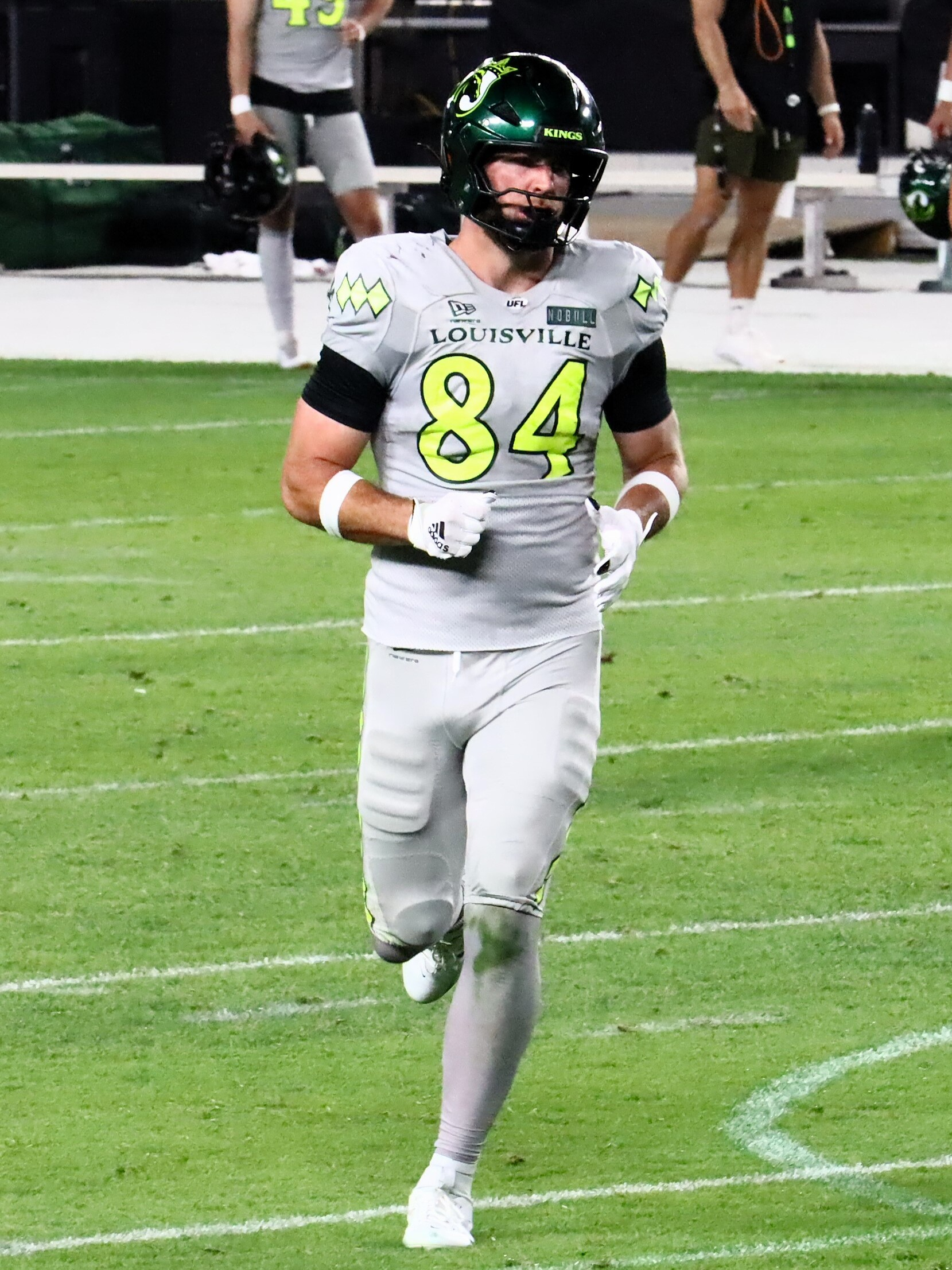
- Davidson with the Louisville Kings in 2026

No. 84 – Louisville Kings
- Position: Tight end
- Roster status: Active

Personal information
- Born: July 15, 1998 (age 28); Webb City, Missouri, U.S.
- Listed height: 6 ft 7 in (2.01 m)
- Listed weight: 245 lb (111 kg)

Career information
- High school: Webb City
- College: Central Missouri (2016–2020)
- NFL draft: 2021: 5th round, 168th overall pick

Career history
- Minnesota Vikings (2021)*; Buffalo Bills (2022–2024)*; New York Giants (2025)*; Louisville Kings (2026–present)
- * Offseason or practice squad member only

Awards and highlights
- UFL champion (2026); First-team Division II All-American (2019); First-team All-MIAA (2019); Second-team All-MIAA (2017)

Career NFL statistics as of 2024
- Receptions: 1
- Receiving yards: 5
- Stats at Pro Football Reference

Zach Davidson (born July 15, 1998) is an American professional football tight end for the Louisville Kings of the United Football League (UFL). He previously played in the National Football League (NFL) for five seasons. Davidson played college football for the Central Missouri Mules, earning first-team Division II All-American honors in 2019. He was selected in the fifth round of the 2021 NFL draft by the Minnesota Vikings, where he spent his first season, and later played three seasons with the Buffalo Bills and one with the New York Giants. Davidson joined the Kings in 2026 and was member of the team that won the 2026 United Bowl.

== Early life ==
Davidson grew up in Webb City, Missouri and attended Webb City High School. He was originally a backup tight end on Webb City's junior varsity team, but became the punter for the varsity team after the Cardinals' regular punter was suspended. He was an All-State selection as a junior and senior at punter.

== College career ==
Davidson began his career at Central Missouri solely as a punter and redshirted his true freshman year. As a redshirt freshman, he set a school record and finished second in the nation with 44.3 yards per punt on 47 punts and was named second-team All-Mid-America Intercollegiate Athletics Association (MIAA). The following season, Davidson was an honorable mention All-MIAA selection at punter and also served as the Mules second tight end, finishing the season with 11 catches for 239 receiving yards and three touchdowns. He had 40 receptions for 894 Yards and 15 touchdowns in his redshirt junior and was named first-team All-MIAA at both punter and tight end as well as a first-team All-American. Davidson opted to forgo his redshirt senior season, which was to be played in the spring due to COVID-19, and enter the 2021 NFL draft.

== Professional career ==
Pre-draft measurables
Height	Weight	Arm length	Hand span	Wingspan	40-yard dash	10-yard split	20-yard split	20-yard shuttle	Three-cone drill	Vertical jump	Broad jump	Bench press
6 ft 6 5/8 in (2.00 m)	245 lb (111 kg)	32 in (0.81 m)	9 1/2 in (0.24 m)	6 ft 4 7/8 in (1.95 m)	4.62 s	1.74 s	2.60 s	4.26 s	6.95 s	37.5 in (0.95 m)	9 ft 9 in (2.97 m)	17 reps
All values from Pro Day

=== Minnesota Vikings ===
Davidson was selected by the Minnesota Vikings in the fifth round, 168th overall, of the 2021 NFL draft. He signed his four-year rookie contract on May 13, 2021. On August 31, Davidson was waived by the Vikings as a part of final roster cuts and re-signed to the practice squad the following day. He was promoted to the active roster on January 8, 2022.

On August 30, 2022, Davidson was waived by Minnesota as a part of final roster cuts.

=== Buffalo Bills ===
On September 1, 2022, Davidson was signed to the Buffalo Bills' practice squad. He signed a reserve/future contract with Buffalo on January 23, 2023.

On June 15, 2023, Davidson was placed on injured reserve with a knee injury.

On August 27, 2024, Davidson was released by the Bills as a part of final roster cuts; he was re-signed to the team's practice squad the following day. In Week 11, Davidson was elevated from the practice squad to the active roster for Buffalo's game against the Kansas City Chiefs. He was elevated to fill in for Dalton Kincaid, who was out due to a knee injury. Davidson recorded his first regular season reception in the NFL. In Weeks 13 and 14, Davidson was again elevated from the practice squad to the active roster for their games against the San Francisco 49ers at home and Los Angeles Rams at SoFi Stadium. In the latter game, he failed to log any stats while playing 16 offensive snaps and 16 snaps on special teams.

On January 29, 2025, Davidson signed a reserve/futures contract with the Bills. During a preseason game against the Tampa Bay Buccaneers, he was punched by Shilo Sanders after blocking Sanders during a play. Sanders hit Davidson in the helmet, which resulted in Sanders being ejected from the game. On August 26, Davidson was released by the Bills as a part of final roster cuts.

=== New York Giants ===
On November 11, 2025, Davidson was signed to the New York Giants' practice squad. In Week 17, Davidson was elevated from the practice squad to the active roster for New York's game against the Las Vegas Raiders.

=== Louisville Kings ===
On March 2, 2026, Davidson signed with the Louisville Kings of the United Football League (UFL).
