= John Roderique =

American football coach

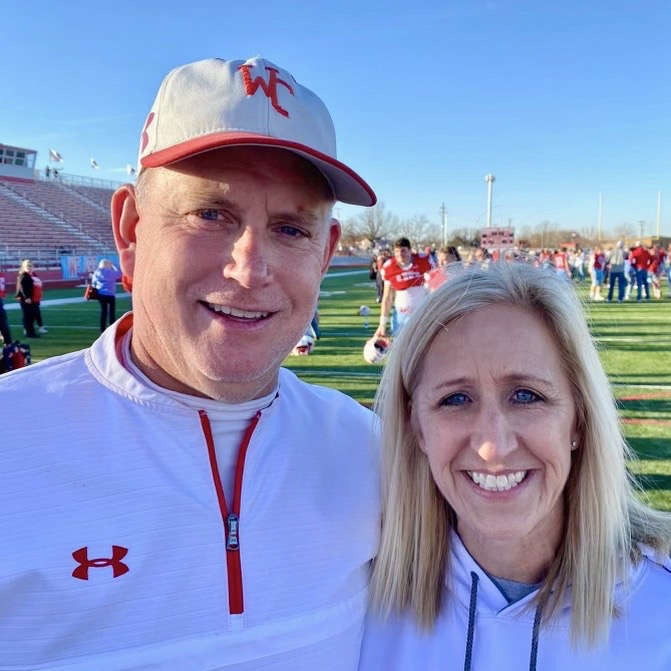
- Roderique with his wife, Heather, in November 2021

Current position
- Title: Athletic director
- Team: Webb City HS (MO)

Biographical details
- Born: October 31, 1967 (age 58); Webb City, Missouri, U.S.
- Education: Pittsburg State University (1990, 1992)

Playing career
- 1986–1989: Pittsburg State
- Position: Linebacker

Coaching career (HC unless noted)
- 1990–1991: Pittsburg State (GA)
- 1992–1996: Pittsburg State (assistant)
- 1997–2022: Webb City HS (MO)

Administrative career (AD unless noted)
- 2006–present: Webb City HS (MO)

Head coaching record
- Overall: 315–35

John Michael Roderique (born October 31, 1967) is an American former high school football coach and athletic director. He served as the head football coach at Webb City, Missouri, High School for 26 years. He announced his retirement on December 5, 2022, including retaining athletic director duties through the end of the 2022–2023 school year. He compiled a record of 315–35, took his team to state playoffs 23 times, made it to the semi-finals or finals in 20 seasons, won 13 state football titles, of which ten were undefeated seasons, and had two state runner-up finishes.

== Early life ==
Roderique was born in Webb City, the seventh of eight children of the late Donald R. Roderique and Jenell (Craton) Roderique. His paternal grandfather, Joseph Francis Roderique, opened Roderique Insurance Agency in Carterville, Missouri in 1945 and operated it until his passing in 1963. Roderique's father moved the agency to Webb City and operated it until his death in 1978. One of Roderique's siblings, Pam Drake, has operated the agency since then until selling it in February, 2026. His father was elected to the Missouri House of Representatives in 1958 and again in 1960, representing Missouri's second district in Jasper County.

Coach Roderique receives trophy for his 300th win as head football coach at Webb City, MO High School, Sept. 10, 2021.

== High school and college football ==
Roderique grew up and attended public schools in Webb City. He began playing organized sports in 1974, at age 7, when he played basketball and baseball in the local city league.

He was a three-sport athlete in four years at Webb City High School, including football, basketball, and track and field (shot put & discus). In his senior year, 1985, he was on the football team that made the state playoffs for the first time in the high school's history, losing in the semifinal game. He was named an all-state linebacker.

After being recruited by assistant coach Jerry Kill at Pittsburg State University in nearby Pittsburg, Kansas, he played four years as inside linebacker under head coach Dennis Franchione. The team won the Central States Intercollegiate conference of the National Association of Intercollegiate Athletics (NAIA) his first three years and advanced to the semi-finals each season. In his fourth season, the Gorillas won the Missouri Intercollegiate Athletic Association conference in NCAA Division II, and advanced to the quarter-final game in playoffs.

He was a team captain in his last two years at the university. He was named honorable mention NAIA All-America linebacker in his junior year and consensus All-America NCAA Division II his senior year, 1989. He finished his playing career with 365 tackles.

== Pittsburg State University career ==
He was awarded a Bachelor of Arts degree in physical education from the university in May 1990, and coached football as a graduate assistant coach for the next two years under new head coach Chuck Broyles, and was awarded a Masters degree in physical education in May 1992. For the 1992 through 1996 seasons he was an assistant coach at the university, which included an NCAA Division II national championship in 1991, as well as runner-up in Division II in 1992 and 1994 under Coach Broyles.

== Webb City High School head coach ==
Citing a need to increase his income, in 1997 he applied for and was selected to be the head coach for his high school alma mater. He was the third head football coach over a 10-year period selected by the school, with two former coaches winning three state championships, Jerry Kill leading for one and Kurt Thompson for two championships.

Webb City High football played in Missouri class 4A. In Roderique's first year as head coach, his team compiled a 14–0 record and won the state championship. In a five-season run of state championships, 2010 to 2014, his team won all their games in four of the five years, and compiled a record of 74–1. In 2006 he added athletic director responsibilities at the high school.

His 13th and last state championship was in 2021, in only the second year for the school to move up to class 5A, owing to a growing school population. His team was ranked fifth with their 6–3 regular season record, which included an uncharacteristic number of losses. In the district playoffs, they first beat Republic, then second-ranked Carthage (10–0), which had beaten Webb City in the regular season. Next, in the state championship games, in the quarter-final Webb City knocked off seventh ranked Lebanon (10–1). The semi-final required them to beat top-ranked Jackson High (12–0), then third-ranked Holt High School (13–0) for the championship. The last four teams (Carthage, Lebanon, Jackson, and Holt) had a combined record of 45–1 and Webb City beat each of them and finished with an 11–3 record.

The 2021 championship placed Webb City first in the number of state football championships (the Show Me Bowl), with 16 total, including the three by former coaches Kill and Thompson, among 54 years of records by the Missouri High School Activities Association (MSHSAA). Roderique's 13 state titles are the most by any coach in MSHSAA history, surpassing nine crowns by Jefferson City's Pete Adkins, who retired in 1994. Also, he surpassed 300 wins on Sept. 10, 2021, in only 329 games, the second fastest ever to reach that win mark among high school head football coaches nationwide. His 315 wins rank fifth all-time in Missouri history, according to MSHSAA records. His win-loss record amounts to a 90.0 winning percentage, which ranks highest all-time in Missouri history. Before the 2023 season, MaxPreps identified 322 high school football coaches in the U.S. as having won 300 games or more. As part of their National High School Football Record Book, the organization listed the top 100 winning percentages. Coach Roderique's record lands him at no. 2, surpassed only by a private high school in California.

After he retired from coaching, he continued as the athletic director for Webb City High School.

== Awards ==
In 1999 Coach Roderique was inducted into the Pittsburg State University Athletics Hall of Fame. In 2015 he was chosen for the Missouri Football Coaches Association Pete Adkins Power of Influence Award. In 2017 he was inducted into the Joplin Area Sports Hall of Fame. In 2017 he was inducted into the Missouri Football Coaches Association Hall of Fame. In 2018, Pittsburg State University awarded him the Meritorious Achievement Award. In September 2018, MaxPreps.com included him as no. 35 on their list of the 50 Greatest High School Football Coaches of All Time. In January 2021, he was enshrined in the Missouri Sports Hall of Fame. On June 15, 2023, the Webb City School District School Board named the high school football field after him, calling it the "John Roderique Field at Cardinal Stadium". On June 24, 2025, the Springfield, Missouri, News-Leader named him number 3 in an article titled, "25 in 2025: Ranking the Springfield Area's 25 Most Impactful Coaches of the Quarter Century", stating, "Roderique might be the greatest high school coach in the state's history and should rank among the nation's best."

== Personal ==
He married Heather Leanne Schnackenberg on March 21, 1992, having met the former Pitt State cheerleader while they were students, both starting in 1986. They have three children – Hailey Jenell Derryberry, John Cooper Roderique, and Tyson James Roderique. They have six grandchildren.
