= Ken Boyer =

American baseball player and manager (1931–1982)

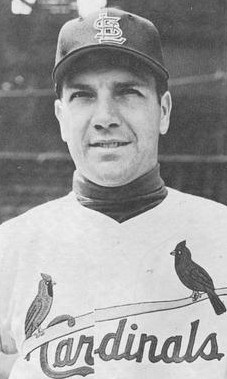
- Boyer with the St. Louis Cardinals in 1965
- Third baseman / Manager
- Born: May 20, 1931; Liberty, Missouri, U.S.
- Died: September 7, 1982 (aged 51); St. Louis, Missouri, U.S.
- Batted: Right Threw: Right

MLB debut
- April 12, 1955, for the St. Louis Cardinals

Last MLB appearance
- August 9, 1969, for the Los Angeles Dodgers

MLB statistics
- Batting average: .287
- Hits: 2,143
- Home runs: 282
- Runs batted in: 1,141
- Managerial record: 166–190
- Winning %: .466
- Stats at Baseball Reference

Teams
- As player: St. Louis Cardinals (1955–1965); New York Mets (1966–1967); Chicago White Sox (1967–1968); Los Angeles Dodgers (1968–1969); As manager: St. Louis Cardinals (1978–1980)

Career highlights and awards
- 11× All-Star (1956, 1959–1964); World Series champion (1964); NL MVP (1964); 5× Gold Glove Award (1958–1961, 1963); NL RBI leader (1964); St. Louis Cardinals No. 14 retired; St. Louis Cardinals Hall of Fame

Kenton Lloyd Boyer (May 20, 1931 – September 7, 1982) was an American professional baseball third baseman and manager. He played 15 seasons in Major League Baseball (MLB) for the St. Louis Cardinals, New York Mets, Chicago White Sox, and Los Angeles Dodgers from 1955 to 1969.

Boyer was an All-Star for seven seasons (11 All-Star Game selections) (Note: Major League Baseball held two All-Star Games for the years from 1959 to 1962.) , a National League (NL) Most Valuable Player (MVP), and a Gold Glove winner in five seasons. He was named the NL MVP in 1964 after batting .295 with 185 hits and leading the NL with 119 runs batted in, and leading the Cardinals to the National League pennant, their first in 18 years. In the World Series, he drove in six runs (leading all Cardinal batters) and hit a pivotal grand slam in Game 4 that helped them even the series before they won it in seven games for Boyer's first and only championship. He hit over .300 for five seasons and hit over 20 home runs for eight seasons.

He became the second third baseman to hit 250 career home runs, retiring with the third highest slugging percentage by a third baseman (.462); he was the third after Pie Traynor and Eddie Mathews to drive in 90 runs eight-times, and remains the only Cardinals player since 1900 to hit for the cycle twice. When Boyer hit 255 home runs, he was second to Stan Musial (475) with Cardinals career home runs and held the team record for a right-handed hitter from 1962 until Albert Pujols passed him in 2007. Boyer also led the NL in double plays five-times and in fielding percentage once, and retired among the all-time leaders in games (sixth, 1,785), assists (sixth, 3,652) and double plays (third, 355) at third base.

The Cardinals retired Boyer's number 14 in 1984 and he was inducted into the St. Louis Cardinals Hall of Fame in 2014.

== Early life ==
Boyer was born in Liberty, Missouri, and grew up in Alba as the fifth of 14 children. He attended Alba High School. All seven boys played professional baseball, with two of his brothers also reaching the major leagues: older brother Cloyd was a pitcher for the Cardinals in the early 1950s, and younger brother Clete became a sharp-fielding third baseman with the Kansas City Athletics, New York Yankees, and Atlanta Braves.

== Baseball career ==
Boyer signed with the Cardinals in 1949, and was initially assigned to the Rochester Red Wings, where his brother Cloyd was his teammate. Boyer did not appear in any games before the organization opened a roster spot for him at a lower level, where the Cardinals initially tried him as a pitcher.

With the Lebanon Chix of the North Atlantic League in 1949, he posted a record of 5–1 with a 3.42 earned run average (ERA) in 12 games, batting .455; the following year, with the Hamilton Cardinals of the Pennsylvania–Ontario–New York League (PONY League), he posted a record of 6–8 with a 4.39 ERA in 21 games while hitting .342. After seeing him hit so well, the Cardinals shifted him to third base, and he batted .306 for the Omaha Cardinals of the Western League in 1951. After serving in the U.S. Army from 1951 to 1953, he batted .319 with 21 home runs and 116 runs batted in (RBI) for the champion Houston Buffaloes of the Texas League in 1954. He joined the Cardinals after they traded Ray Jablonski following the 1954 season.

=== Major leagues ===
==== St. Louis Cardinals ====
Boyer made his major league debut with the Cardinals on April 12, 1955, in a 14–4 road loss to the Chicago Cubs, hitting a two-run homer in the eighth inning off Paul Minner as his first hit, and batted .264 with 62 RBI his rookie season. In 1956, he received his first of seven NL All-Star selections and started at third base (first of five starts at third base) batting cleanup for the National League All-Star team; he finished the season with a .306 batting average, 26 home runs and 98 RBI, and led NL third basemen in assists (309) and double plays (37). He was shifted to center field in 1957 to allow rookie Eddie Kasko to break in at third, and led all NL outfielders in fielding percentage, but returned to third base in 1958, winning the first of four consecutive Gold Gloves and again collecting 90 RBI while batting .307 and scoring 100 runs for the first time. That year he also became the Cardinals' regular cleanup hitter, a role he would hold regularly for the remainder of his time with the club. His 41 double plays in 1958 equalled the second-highest total in NL history to that point, and fell just two short of Hank Thompson's 1950 league mark; he also led the league in putouts (156).

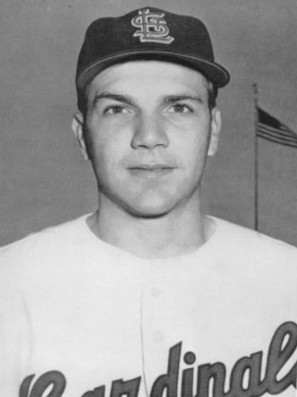
Boyer in 1957

He became the Cardinals team captain in 1959, and compiled a 29-game hitting streak from August 10 to September 12 of that year, during which he batted .350 with eight home runs and 23 RBI; it was the longest hitting streak in the major leagues since Musial's 30-game run in 1950. Boyer finished 10th in the MVP voting that season after batting .309 with 28 home runs and 94 RBI, and began a run of six consecutive All-Star selections, starting the second of the two 1959 games; he again led the NL with 32 double plays. In 1960–61 Boyer led the Cardinals in batting average (.304 and .329), home runs (32 and 24), runs (95 and 109), RBI (97 and 95) and total bases (310 and 314), and finished 6th and 7th in the MVP voting. He led the league with 37 double plays in 1960, and with 346 assists in 1961. He was also named the NL's Player of the Month for September 1960 after batting .385. He hit for the cycle, with an additional single, in the second game of a doubleheader on September 14, 1961, against the Cubs, becoming the first player in MLB history to complete the cycle with a walk-off home run in the bottom of the 11th inning for a 6–5 victory; his RBI double in the 9th inning had tied the game. In that game he also joined Musial as the only Cardinals to hit two walk-off home runs in a season in two different years; Boyer also had two walk-off homers in 1958 (May 31 and June 11; he was the fourth Cardinals player to ever hit two extra-inning walk-off homers in a season, with both leading off the bottom of the 12th inning) and a previous one in 1961 on August 8. On September 19, 1962, Boyer broke Rogers Hornsby's team record for home runs by a right-handed hitter with his 194th career round-tripper, a two-run shot off Billy O'Dell in the first inning of a 7–4 loss to the San Francisco Giants. He finished the season with 98 RBI, equaling his career best to that point, and started both All-Star games, also leading the league in double plays for the last time with 34. On June 7, 1963, Boyer became the second Cardinals player to hit 200 career homers, connecting off Al Jackson in the 4th inning of a 3–2 road loss to the New York Mets. He was again named to the NL All-Star starting lineup, increased his RBI season total to 111 that year, and won his fifth Gold Glove award.

Ken Boyer's number 14 was retired by the St. Louis Cardinals in 1984.

Boyer had his best season in 1964, keeping the Cardinals alive for much of the season as he batted .350 in May and .342 in July, and starting for the NL in his last All-Star appearance. On June 16, he became the 19th player in major league history to hit for the cycle twice, and the seventh to hit for a natural cycle, in a 7–1 road victory against the Houston Colt .45s. Boyer's productivity early in the season kept the team in contention, although they were still only 54–51 and tied for fifth place on August 4; they fell 11 games out of first place by August 23, but mounted one of the truly great comebacks in MLB history, overtaking the Philadelphia Phillies in the final weeks to win the NL pennant by a single game; Boyer batted .400 in five September games against the Phillies. He enjoyed his career highlight against the New York Yankees in the 1964 World Series, hitting a grand slam in Game 4 off pitcher Al Downing to give the Cardinals a 4–3 victory; the home run came after Yankees second baseman Bobby Richardson misplayed a double play ground ball off the bat of Dick Groat, which would have ended the inning without any damage done. His brother Clete, playing in his fifth consecutive Series with the Yankees, later conceded he was privately thrilled for his brother because it was Boyer’s first Series. Then, in the decisive Game 7, he collected three hits (including a double and a home run), and scored three runs as St. Louis clinched the World Championship 7–5, their first title since 1946. Clete also homered in that game, the only time in World Series history where brothers have homered in the same game. Boyer earned National League MVP honors after hitting .295 with 24 home runs and leading the league with 119 RBI, becoming the first NL third baseman to do so since Heinie Zimmerman in 1917; he was also honored as The Sporting News Major League Player of the Year, and received the Lou Gehrig Memorial Award for character and integrity. It was also his seventh consecutive season of 90 or more RBI, tying Pie Traynor's major league record for third basemen. Boyer hit exactly 24 home runs in each of four consecutive years (1961–1964) to set a record for most consecutive years with the same home run total and at least 20 home runs; the record was tied by Fred Lynn of the California Angels and Baltimore Orioles (23 each year from 1984 to 1987). On July 10, 1965, Boyer hit his 250th home run off Dick Ellsworth in the 9th inning of a 5–3 road loss to the Cubs, and on September 28 he became the fifth Cardinals player to drive in 1,000 runs, in the 9th inning of a 9–1 road win against the Giants. After 11 years with the Cardinals, Boyer began to suffer back problems in 1965, though still led the league in fielding percentage (.968) for the only time in his career; after batting just .260 with 13 homers and 75 RBI.

==== New York Mets ====
In October 1965, Boyer was traded to the New York Mets for Al Jackson and third baseman Charley Smith. With the downtrodden Mets, he was stuck on a losing team although managed to achieve several more career milestones. On May 13, 1966, he scored his 1,000th run in a 5–4 17-inning loss to the Giants; he ended the year batting .266 with 14 home runs and 61 RBI. On May 10, 1967, he collected his 2,000th career hit, a single off Milt Pappas in the 4th inning of a 7–4 loss to the Cincinnati Reds, and on May 20 he hit his 300th career double off Nelson Briles in an 11–9 loss to the Cardinals.

==== Chicago White Sox ====
On July 27, 1967, with Boyer batting .235, the Mets traded him to the Chicago White Sox along with second baseman Sandy Alomar, in exchange for third baseman Bill Southworth, whose career ended after he spent the remainder of the year in the minors, and catcher J. C. Martin. Boyer hit .261 over the rest of the season, however the White Sox released him on May 2, 1968, after he batted only .125 in 10 games.

==== Los Angeles Dodgers ====
Boyer signed with the Los Angeles Dodgers on May 10, 1968. He hit .271 in his return to the NL, and appeared in his 2,000th game on September 7 in a 4–2 loss at Cincinnati. Boyer returned to the Dodgers in 1969, but was used almost exclusively as a pinch hitter. He appeared in his last game on August 9, 1969, a 4–0 loss to the Cubs, grounding out as a pinch hitter in the 9th inning. After batting just .206 in 25 games that season, Boyer felt that his playing career was over and he wanted to become a coach. The Dodgers encouraged him to return as a player for the 1970 season, feeling that young players would be more likely to listen to him as a veteran player than as a coach, but Boyer chose to retire.

In his 15-year MLB career, Boyer was a .287 hitter with 2,143 hits, 282 home runs and 1,141 RBI, 1,104 runs scored, 318 doubles, 68 triples and 105 stolen bases in 2,034 games played; he also batted .348 with two home runs in his seven All-Star and ten All-Star Game appearances (played in 7/8 games in 1959–62). His career slugging average of .462 ranked third among players with at least 1,000 games at third base, behind Eddie Mathews (.509) and Ron Santo (then at .478), and among NL players he trailed only Mathews in assists and double plays at third base. Upon Clete's retirement in 1971, the Boyers' 444 career home runs (282 by Ken, 162 by Clete) were the fourth most in major league history by two brothers, behind Hank and Tommie Aaron (768) and the separate pairings of Joe DiMaggio with his brothers Vince (486) and Dom (448). Boyer's 12 career walk-off hits for the Cardinals remain a record for any player since 1950, equaled only by Lou Brock and Albert Pujols. On April 28, 2007, Pujols broke his Cardinals record for right-handed hitters with his 256th career home run, in an 8–1 loss to the Cubs.

=== Career statistics ===
Category	Games	AB	Runs	Hits	2B	3B	HR	RBI	SB	CS	BB	SO	AVG	OBP	SLG	OPS	E	FLD%	Ref.
Total	2,034	7,455	1,104	2,143	318	68	282	1,141	105	77	713	1,017	.287	.349	.462	.810	274	.957	

== MLB awards ==
Boyer's MLB awards:

Award / Honor	Time(s)	Date(s)
National League All-Star	11	1956, 1959 (2), 1960 (2), 1961 (2), 1962 (2), 1963, 1964
National League Most Valuable Player	1	1964
National League Gold Glove Award (3B)	5	1958–1961, 1963
National League Player of the Month Award	1	September 1960

=== Other honors ===
- The Sporting News' MLB Player of the Year (1964)
- Lou Gehrig Memorial Award (1964)
- Boyer's uniform number 14, which he wore throughout his career with the Cardinals, was retired by the team on Sunday May 20, 1984.
- St. Louis Sports Hall of Fame (2012)
- St. Louis Cardinals Hall of Fame (2014): The Cardinals announced Boyer among 22 former players and personnel to be inducted into the inaugural class of 2014.

== Post-playing career ==
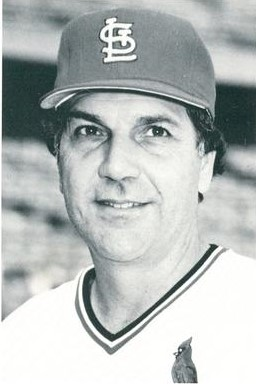
Boyer as Cardinals manager in 1980

Boyer became a manager in the Cardinals' minor league system, first leading the Arkansas Travelers of the Texas League in 1970. He returned to the Cardinals as a coach under former teammate Red Schoendienst in 1971–72, then went back to managing in the minors, leading the Gulf Coast League Cardinals (1973), Tulsa Oilers of the American Association (1974–76), and Rochester Red Wings of the International League (1977–78); he won a league title with Tulsa in 1974. Among the players he developed in the minors were Keith Hernandez, Garry Templeton, Mike Easler, Tito Landrum, and Larry Herndon.

Boyer was named manager of the Cardinals in early 1978, after Vern Rapp was fired with the team at 6–11 (Jack Krol served as interim manager for two games), and posted a 62–81 record. The following year St. Louis finished in third place at 86–76, but Boyer was dismissed 51 games into the 1980 season with a record of 18–33; Krol again served a game as interim manager before Whitey Herzog took over the reins. Boyer finished with a 166–190 record in three seasons. He was scheduled to return to Rochester for the 1981 season, but lung cancer forced him to give up the job.

== Hall of Fame candidacy ==
Boyer became eligible for election to the Baseball Hall of Fame in 1975, at a time when the Baseball Writers' Association of America (BBWAA) had only elected one third baseman in thirty elections (Traynor in 1948). Boyer received less than 5% of the vote every year before being dropped from consideration after the 1979 vote. After several years of complaints about overlooked candidates, Boyer was one of three players restored to the ballot in 1985, along with Cardinals outfielder Curt Flood and fellow third baseman Ron Santo, who had himself received less than 4% of the vote in his only year on the ballot in 1980. Boyer peaked at 25.5% of the vote in 1988.

Boyer has since been a candidate on the Veterans Committee ballot in 2003, 2005, and 2007. He appeared again on the Golden Era Committee (replaced the Veterans Committee in 2010 and votes every three years) ballot of 10 candidates from the 1947–1972 era, in 2011 and 2014. In each of the two elections, Boyer fell short by 9 of the 12 required votes for Hall of Fame election. None of the 10 candidates (three of the nine player candidates including Boyer were MVP winners) were elected by the Hall of Fame's Golden Era Committee in 2014.

The Golden Era Committee was replaced in July 2016 by a 16-member Golden Days Committee, to vote from a 10-candidate ballot for the 1950–1969 era. The Golden Days Committee voted for the first time in December 2021, for induction into the Hall of Fame's class of 2022, but Boyer once again fell short. He appeared on the Classic Baseball Era Committee's 2025 ballot, but only received less than five votes.

== Personal life ==
Boyer married Kathleen Oliver in April 1952. The couple had four children—Susie, David, Danny, and Janie—but eventually divorced. David was drafted by the Cardinals in 1974 and played in their farm system until 1978. Boyer died from cancer in St. Louis on September 7, 1982, at the age of 51. He had undergone laetrile treatments in Mexico in an attempt to fight the disease. He was buried in Friends Cemetery in Purcell, Missouri. He was survived by 12 of his 13 siblings, and by his four children.

== See also ==
- List of St. Louis Cardinals team records
- List of Gold Glove Award winners at third base
- List of Major League Baseball annual runs batted in leaders
- List of Major League Baseball career assists as a third baseman leaders
- List of Major League Baseball career double plays leaders
- List of Major League Baseball career hits leaders
- List of Major League Baseball career home run leaders
- List of Major League Baseball career putouts as a third baseman leaders
- List of Major League Baseball career runs batted in leaders
- List of Major League Baseball career runs scored leaders
- List of Major League Baseball players to hit for the cycle

== Notes ==
Awards and achievements
Preceded by Warren Spahn	Major League Player of the Month; September 1960	Succeeded by Joey Jay
Preceded by Bill White; Jim King	Hitting for the cycle September 14, 1961; June 16, 1964	Succeeded by Lou Clinton; Willie Stargell
