= Brian Bond (activist) =

American LGBTQ rights activist

Brian K. Bond
- Born: October 14, 1961; Missouri, U.S.
- Education: Missouri State University

Brian Bond (born October 14, 1961) is an American LGBT rights activist who was the first openly gay deputy director in the White House Office of Public Engagement. He is currently the executive director of PFLAG.

== Personal life ==
Bond was born and grew up in rural Missouri, the son of Skip Bond, a business manager for a pipefitter local union, and Donna Daly, a member of the Missouri Democratic State Committee. At age 16, he came out as gay to his priest.

Bond graduated from Webb City High School in Jasper County, Missouri, and then earned a degree in Public Administration from Missouri State University in Springfield, Missouri.

Bond discovered in his early thirties that he was HIV positive, and became an advocate for HIV education.

== Political career ==
Bond got an early start on politics, serving in various paid and volunteer staff roles for Mel Carnahan's state treasurer race in 1980, Bob Holden's state representative race in 1982, Ike Skelton's congressional race in 1984, Bob Holden's state treasurer race in 1988 and Vince Schoemehl's 1989 mayoral race in St. Louis. At age 30, Bond was already field director of the Missouri Democratic Party's coordinated campaign for Clinton-Gore when he was tapped to lead the state party as its executive director in 1992.

He would later be named director of LGBTQ outreach at the Democratic National Committee in Washington, D.C.

In 1997, Bond was hired as executive director of the Gay & Lesbian Victory Fund to rebuild the nearly-bankrupt organization. He is credited by Tammy Baldwin with helping grow the visibility and size of the organization. He left the organization in 2003.

Bond was later hired by Democratic National Committee Chairman Howard Dean to replace Donald Hitchcock as executive director of the DNC's Gay and Lesbian Leadership Council., and would eventually join Obama for America as National Constituency Director in Chicago, Illinois.

In January 2009, The Advocate magazine announced that Bond would be named deputy director of the White House Office of Public Liaison under Tina Tchen, as confirmed by the transition team of then-President-elect Barack Obama. In this role, he would serve in a managerial capacity for the office as well as serve a primary role on LGBTQ issues, and was ultimately central to discussions around LGBTQ issues in the Obama administration, including the administration's response to the Defense of Marriage Act, until his departure in 2011.

Bond left the White House to rejoin the Democratic National Committee as Director of Constituency Outreach in August 2011. He later served as CEO for public engagement at the 2016 Democratic National Convention in Philadelphia.

In January 2019, Bond was named executive director of the LGBTQ advocacy organization PFLAG based in Washington, D.C.
