= Purcell, Missouri =

- City
- Location within Jasper County and Missouri
- Coordinates: 37°14′36″N 94°26′22″W
- Country: United States
- State: Missouri
- County: Jasper

Area
  - Total: 0.44 sq mi (1.13 km^{2})
  - Land: 0.44 sq mi (1.13 km^{2})
  - Water: 0 sq mi (0.00 km^{2})
- Elevation: 938 ft (286 m)

Population (2020)
  - Total: 318
  - Density: 731.4/sq mi (282.41/km^{2})
- Time zone: UTC-6 (Central (CST))
  - Summer (DST): UTC-5 (CDT)
- ZIP code: 64857
- Area code: 417
- FIPS code: 29-60140
- GNIS feature ID: 2396292

Purcell is a city in Jasper County, Missouri, United States. As of the 2020 census, the city population was 318.

== History ==
Purcell was platted in 1903, and named after James Purcell, a local law enforcement agent. A post office has been in operation in Purcell since 1905.

== Geography ==
Purcell is located between the Spring River and the North Fork Spring River approximately eight miles northwest of Carthage. Alba is one mile to the east on Missouri Route D and Neck City is one mile to the northwest.

According to the United States Census Bureau, the city has a total area of 0.44 square miles (1.14 km^{2}), all land.

== Demographics ==
Historical population
Census	Pop.	Note	%±
1910	994		—
1920	603		−39.3%
1930	362		−40.0%
1940	204		−43.6%
1950	334		63.7%
1960	265		−20.7%
1970	325		22.6%
1980	322		−0.9%
1990	354		9.9%
2000	357		0.8%
2010	408		14.3%
2020	318		−22.1%
U.S. Decennial Census

Purcell is part of the Joplin, Missouri Metropolitan Statistical Area.

=== 2010 census ===
As of the census of 2010, there were 408 people, 142 households, and 108 families living in the city. The population density was 927.3 inhabitants per square mile (358.0/km^{2}). There were 162 housing units at an average density of 368.2 per square mile (142.2/km^{2}). The racial makeup of the city was 94.4% White, 1.5% African American, 2.2% Native American, and 2.0% from two or more races. Hispanic or Latino of any race were 0.7% of the population.

There were 142 households, of which 42.3% had children under the age of 18 living with them, 61.3% were married couples living together, 12.0% had a female householder with no husband present, 2.8% had a male householder with no wife present, and 23.9% were non-families. 20.4% of all households were made up of individuals, and 7% had someone living alone who was 65 years of age or older. The average household size was 2.87 and the average family size was 3.30.

The median age in the city was 32.6 years. 30.4% of residents were under the age of 18; 7.9% were between the ages of 18 and 24; 29.3% were from 25 to 44; 22.8% were from 45 to 64; and 9.8% were 65 years of age or older. The gender makeup of the city was 46.3% male and 53.7% female.

=== 2000 census ===
As of the census of 2000, there were 357 people, 131 households, and 102 families living in the city. The population density was 856.0 inhabitants per square mile (330.5/km^{2}). There were 151 housing units at an average density of 362.1 per square mile (139.8/km^{2}). The racial makeup of the city was 96.64% White, 2.24% Native American, 0.56% Asian, and 0.56% from two or more races. Hispanic or Latino of any race were 3.08% of the population.

There were 131 households, out of which 32.8% had children under the age of 18 living with them, 67.2% were married couples living together, 6.9% had a female householder with no husband present, and 22.1% were non-families. 19.1% of all households were made up of individuals, and 9.9% had someone living alone who was 65 years of age or older. The average household size was 2.73 and the average family size was 3.11.

In the city the population was spread out, with 27.2% under the age of 18, 8.1% from 18 to 24, 32.5% from 25 to 44, 19.0% from 45 to 64, and 13.2% who were 65 years of age or older. The median age was 35 years. For every 100 females, there were 97.2 males. For every 100 females age 18 and over, there were 104.7 males.

The median income for a household in the city was $31,964, and the median income for a family was $36,000. Males had a median income of $24,583 versus $17,813 for females. The per capita income for the city was $10,866. About 4.7% of families and 5.4% of the population were below the poverty line, including 4.6% of those under age 18 and 5.4% of those age 65 or over.

== Education ==
It is in the Webb City R-VII School District. Webb City High School is the district's comprehensive high school.
