= Grace Steele Woodward =

American writer and historian

- Born: September 14, 1899; Joplin, Missouri, U.S.A.
- Died: December 18, 1987 (aged 88); Oklahoma?, U.S.A.
- Education: University of Missouri; University of Oklahoma; Teachers College at Columbia University
- Occupations: author and playwright
- Spouse: Guy Woodward
- Writing career
- Genre: non-fiction history

Grace Steele Woodward (14 September 1899 – 18 December 1987) was an American writer and historian known for non-fiction books.

== Biography ==
=== Early life and education ===
Grace Steele was born on September 14, 1899, in Joplin, Missouri, U.S. Her family moved to Webb City, Missouri, U.S.A., where she graduated from Webb City High School in 1917.

Woodward attended the University of Missouri, the University of Oklahoma, and Teachers College at Columbia University in New York, U.S.A.

=== Career ===
Woodward worked as a professional storyteller.

Grace Steele married Guy Hendon Woodward, an attorney, in 1920; they started a family before she began her writing career with a course at the University of Tulsa. Grace's stories appeared in Parents, Forecast, and Holland's Magazine. Sometimes she wrote under the pseudonym Marian Doane to protect the privacy of her children.

Mrs. Woodward's first book, The Man Who Conquered Pain (1962) was about William T.G. Morton, the dentist who promoted the use of ether. Her second book, The Cherokees (1963) was a history of the Cherokee tribe and it received widespread acclaim. Her third book, published in 1969, was a biography of Pocahontas. It won first prize from the Oklahoma State Writers. Her fourth book, The Secrets of Sherwood Forest, was co-authored with her husband, Guy Woodward, and published in 1973; it covered the drilling of oil in Sherwood Forest during World War II.

=== Personal life, death, and legacy ===
Mrs. Woodward was inducted into the Oklahoma Hall of Fame in 1968. She was a member of .

Grace Steele Woodward was widowed when her husband of 52 years, Guy Woodward, died in 1979. Grace passed 8 years later on December 18, 1987.

== Works ==
- The Man Who Conquered Pain: A Biography of William Thomas Green Morton. Beacon Press, 1962.
- The Cherokees. University of Oklahoma Press, 1963.
- Pocahontas. University of Oklahoma Press, 1969.
- The Secrets of Sherwood Forest: Oil Production in England During World War II. With Guy H. Woodward. University of Oklahoma Press, 1973.
