= Elijah Thomas Webb Residence =

Historic house in Missouri, United States

- U.S. National Register of Historic Places
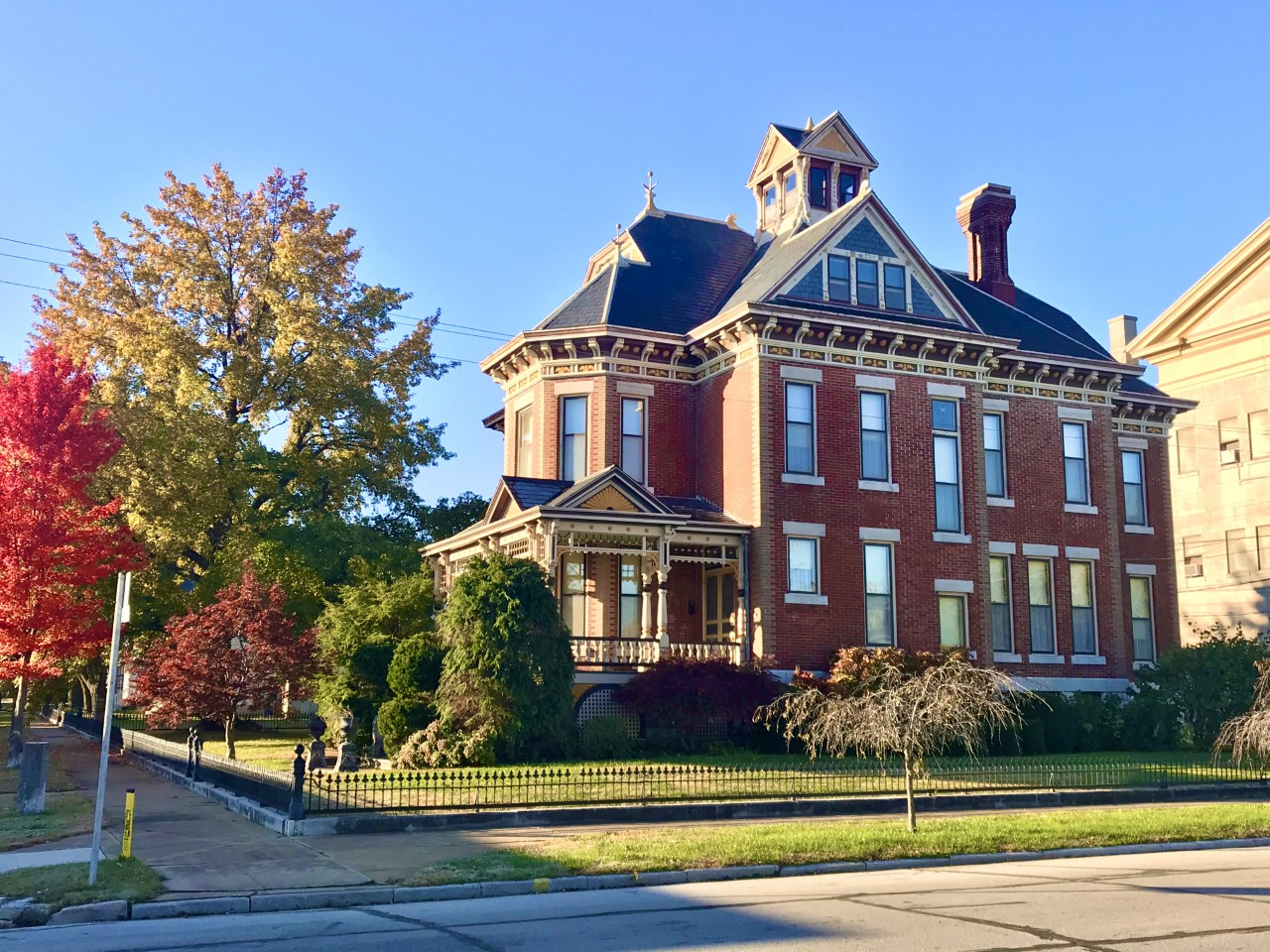
- The house in 2019

- Location within Missouri Location within the United States
- Location: 4 S. Liberty, Webb City, Missouri
- Coordinates: 37°08′45″N 94°27′55″W
- Area: Less than one acre
- Built: c. 1891
- Architectural style: Late Victorian Queen Anne
- NRHP reference No.: 100005346
- Added to NRHP: July 20, 2020

The Elijah Thomas Webb Residence is a historic home in Webb City, Missouri. It was added to the National Register of Historic Places in 2020 as an "outstanding example of a high-style Queen Anne residence." The three-story building was built c. 1891 and has retained many of its original details. It is a rare surviving example of Queen Anne single-family architecture in Webb City. The residence was designed with an eclectic mixture of architectural features that include the Queen Anne, Italianate, Romanesque, and Eastlake movement details. The building has an irregular shape with a slate-clad hip roof with some lower gable sections and a polygonal tower on the front elevation. Red brick walls include contrasting bullnose corner bricks to create faux quoining on top a batter (walls) limestone foundation that extends five feet above grade. The most significant modification to the main building was the addition of a second-floor sleeping porch c. 1914.

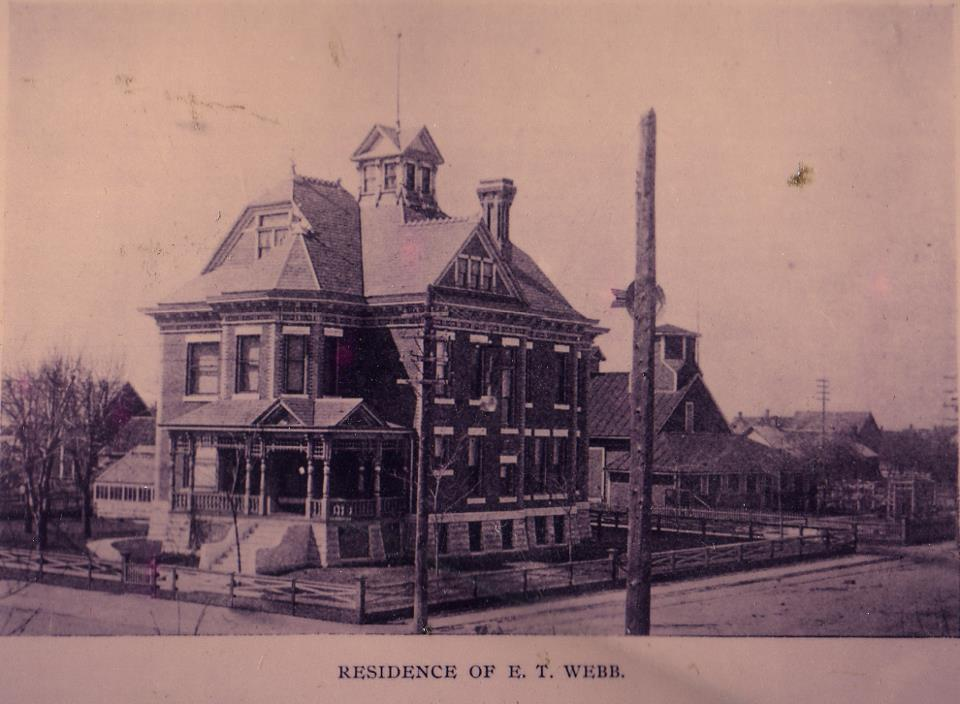
Historic photo of Elijah Thomas Webb Residence

== Background ==
Elijah Thomas Webb was born August 24, 1851, and was the oldest of the four children of John C. Webb and Ruth Davis Webb. The family moved from his birthplace in Overton County, Tennessee, to southwest Missouri in 1856 to start a new life farming. They first made their home approximately 6 miles (9.7 km) southeast of present-day Webb City, at the head of Turkey Creek. In February 1857, the father obtained 200 acres (81 ha) of land from the government and began farming. During the Civil War, John Webb left his family and farm and served under General Sterling Price for the Confederacy. During this time, Elijah Webb assumed the duties of head of the household. After the war, John returned and increased his land holdings to 320 acres (130 ha).

In June 1873, John Webb discovered lead while he was plowing a corn field. John first attempted to mine the lead himself but after approximately a year, he leased the land for mining and used the proceeds to develop real estate interests and build Webb City. John recorded the plat of Webb City in September 1875, and by December 8, 1876, the town of Webb City was incorporated as a fourth class city. Its prosperity attracted the Missouri Pacific, Kansas City, Fort Scott and Memphis, and St. Louis & San Francisco railroads to town.

In 1877, Elijah Webb enrolled at the University of Missouri in Columbia. He then attended the Gem City Commercial College in Quincy, Illinois, and returned to Missouri and worked for two years as the deputy county collector for Jasper County in Carthage before joining his father's business. On June 2, 1882, they organized the Webb City Bank. The father died April 13, 1883, and Elijah inherited the bank and a portion of the family's lead and zinc-rich land.

In 1883, Elijah Webb was treasurer of Webb City, school board member, and a director of the Joplin College of Physicians and Surgeons. By 1891, he was married with a son and President of Webb City Bank, part owner of Webb City Lumber Company and of the Webb City Water Works Company. Webb's business interests and mineral-rich land holding contributed to an estimated net worth of $300,000 (equivalent to $9,530,000 in 2024), allowing him to construct the high-style Queen Anne residence as a symbol of his success.

The exact construction date and the architect is unknown but the lot was purchased by Webb in 1891 and it is likely the house was built shortly thereafter. The house is shown on a 1906 Sanborn fire insurance map.

The house was listed after being nominated by the owners, Don and Becky Freeman, who purchased the home around 2010. The couple performed research and prepared the nomination form without the help of professionals.

== See also ==
- U.S. Route 66 in Missouri
- National Register of Historic Places listings in Jasper County, Missouri
- National Register of Historic Places listings in Missouri
