= Neck City, Missouri =

City in Jasper County, Missouri

- City
- Location within Jasper County and Missouri
- Coordinates: 37°15′18″N 94°26′42″W
- Country: United States
- State: Missouri
- County: Jasper

Area
  - Total: 0.39 sq mi (1.02 km^{2})
  - Land: 0.39 sq mi (1.02 km^{2})
  - Water: 0 sq mi (0.00 km^{2})
- Elevation: 945 ft (288 m)

Population (2020)
  - Total: 228
  - Density: 580.9/sq mi (224.27/km^{2})
- Time zone: UTC-6 (Central (CST))
  - Summer (DST): UTC-5 (CDT)
- ZIP code: 64849
- Area code: 417
- FIPS code: 29-51356
- GNIS feature ID: 2395163

Neck City is a city in Jasper County, Missouri, United States. The population was 228 at the 2020 census.

== History ==
Neck City had its start as a rough mining settlement called Hell's Neck. A post office called Neck was established in 1899, and the name was changed to Neck City in 1957. Neck City has been noted for its unusual place name.

== Geography ==
Neck City is located between the Spring River and the North Fork Spring River approximately nine miles northwest of Carthage. The community of Purcell is one mile to the south.

According to the United States Census Bureau, the city has a total area of 0.39 square miles (1.01 km^{2}), all land.

== Demographics ==
Historical population
Census	Pop.	Note	%±
1900	374		—
1910	528		41.2%
1920	241		−54.4%
1930	123		−49.0%
1940	221		79.7%
1950	117		−47.1%
1960	110		−6.0%
1970	114		3.6%
1980	151		32.5%
1990	132		−12.6%
2000	119		−9.8%
2010	186		56.3%
2020	228		22.6%
U.S. Decennial Census

Neck City is part of the Joplin, Missouri Metropolitan Statistical Area.

=== 2010 census ===
As of the census of 2010, there were 186 people, 68 households, and 49 families living in the city. The population density was 476.9 inhabitants per square mile (184.1/km^{2}). There were 81 housing units at an average density of 207.7 per square mile (80.2/km^{2}). The racial makeup of the city was 93.5% White, 2.2% Native American, and 4.3% from two or more races. Hispanic or Latino of any race were 1.6% of the population.

There were 68 households, of which 33.8% had children under the age of 18 living with them, 61.8% were married couples living together, 8.8% had a female householder with no husband present, 1.5% had a male householder with no wife present, and 27.9% were non-families. 25.0% of all households were made up of individuals, and 14.7% had someone living alone who was 65 years of age or older. The average household size was 2.74 and the average family size was 3.29.

The median age in the city was 37.8 years. 27.4% of residents were under the age of 18; 4.4% were between the ages of 18 and 24; 28% were from 25 to 44; 24.7% were from 45 to 64; and 15.6% were 65 years of age or older. The gender makeup of the city was 48.4% male and 51.6% female.

=== 2000 census ===
As of the census of 2000, there were 119 people, 49 households, and 34 families living in the city. The population density was 1,149.6 inhabitants per square mile (443.9/km^{2}). There were 54 housing units at an average density of 521.7 per square mile (201.4/km^{2}). The racial makeup of the city was 96.64% White, 0.84% Native American, and 2.52% from two or more races. Hispanic or Latino of any race were 5.04% of the population.

There were 49 households, out of which 30.6% had children under the age of 18 living with them, 46.9% were married couples living together, 6.1% had a female householder with no husband present, and 30.6% were non-families. 28.6% of all households were made up of individuals, and 12.2% had someone living alone who was 65 years of age or older. The average household size was 2.43 and the average family size was 2.91.

In the city, the population was spread out, with 26.9% under the age of 18, 10.1% from 18 to 24, 24.4% from 25 to 44, 27.7% from 45 to 64, and 10.9% who were 65 years of age or older. The median age was 36 years. For every 100 females, there were 124.5 males. For every 100 females age 18 and over, there were 128.9 males.

The median income for a household in the city was $29,375, and the median income for a family was $33,438. Males had a median income of $16,458 versus $20,000 for females. The per capita income for the city was $12,454. There were no families and 3.4% of the population living below the poverty line, including no under eighteens and none of those over 64.

== Education ==
It is in the Webb City R-VII School District. Webb City High School is the district's comprehensive high school.
