= Downtown Webb City Historic District =

Historic district in Missouri, United States

- U.S. National Register of Historic Places
- U.S. Historic district
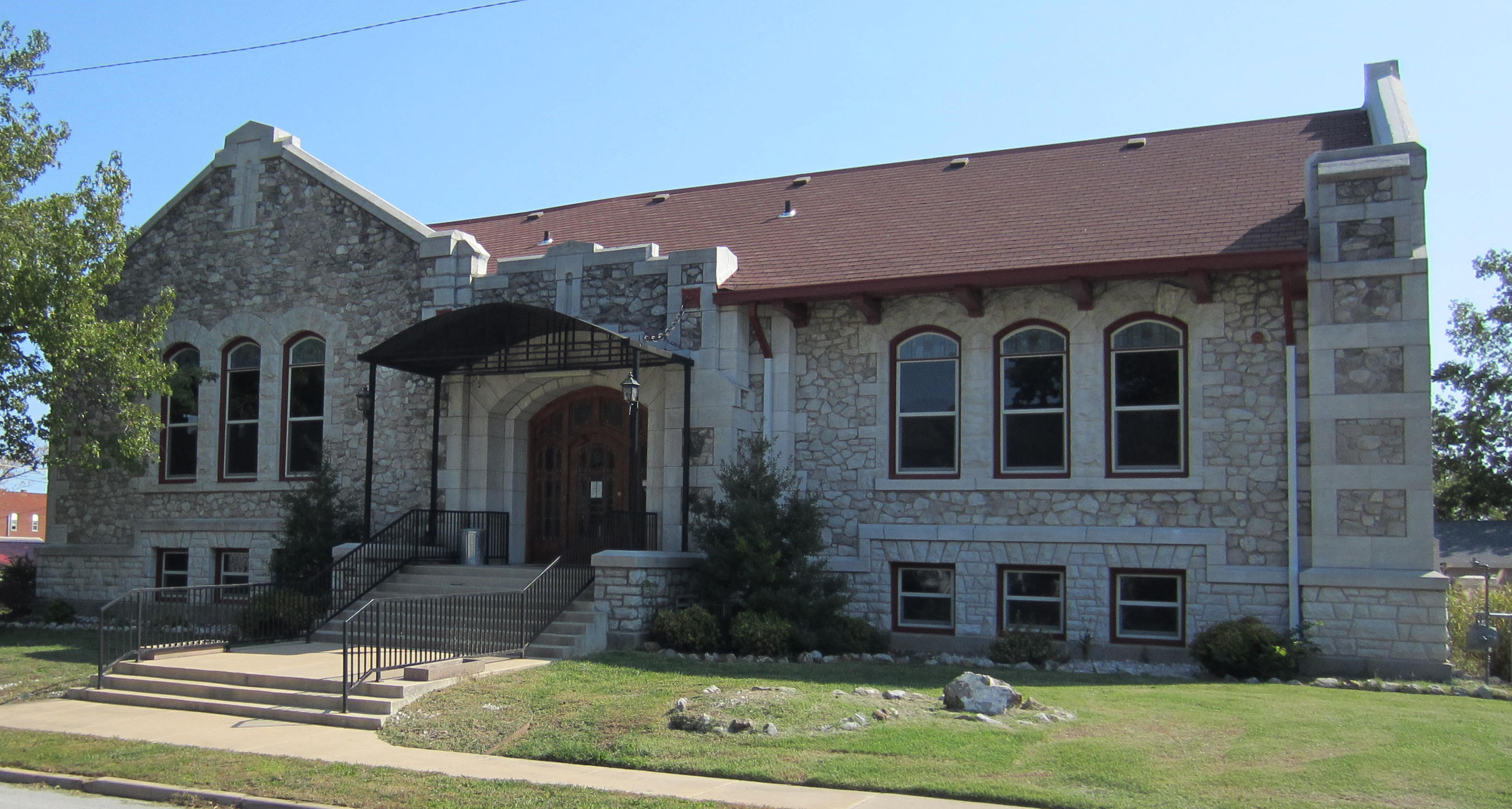
- Carnegie Library in Webb City

- Location within Missouri Location within the United States
- Location: Roughly N. and S. Main, E. and W. Broadway, Daugherty, E. Church, N. Tom, N. Liberty, and N. and S. Webb, Webb City, Missouri
- Coordinates: 37°08′48″N 94°27′50″W
- Area: 12.36 acres (5.00 ha)
- Built: c. 1883
- Architectural style: Italianate, Late 19th and 20th Century Revivals, Art Deco, Modern Movement
- NRHP reference No.: 14000427
- Added to NRHP: July 18, 2014

Downtown Webb City Historic District is a national historic district located at Webb City, Jasper County, Missouri. The district encompasses 43 contributing buildings in the central business district of Webb City. It developed between about 1883 and 1965 and includes representative examples of Italianate, Renaissance Revival, Romanesque Revival, Art Deco, and Streamline Moderne style architecture. Located in the district is the previously listed Middle West Hotel. Other notable buildings include the National Bank (c. 1890), S. Morris Department Store (c. 1907), Morris Opera House and Royal Furniture Co. (c. 1890), The Unity Building and Merchant and Miners Bank (c. 1906), Aylor Building / Odd Fellow Hall (c. 1905), Mystic Theater (c. 1914), Newland Hotel (c. 1890), Dickenson Theater (c. 1928), Civic Theater (c. 1931), U.S. Post Office (c. 1916), and the Old U.S. Post Office / Wagner Building (c. 1907).

It was listed on the National Register of Historic Places in 2014.
