= School District of Webb City R-7 =

School district in Missouri, U.S.

Webb City R-7 School District

Address
- 411 North Madison Street Webb City, Missouri Alba, Carterville, Oronogo, Purcell, most of Webb City, portions of Airport Drive, Duenweg Joplin, and Carl Junction, and some unincorporated portions of Jasper County Jasper County, 64870; United States
- Coordinates: 37°09′01″N 94°28′27″W

District information
- Type: Public school district
- Grades: Pre K-12
- Established: 1877; 149 years ago
- Superintendent: Dr. Brenten Byrd
- Schools: 12
- Budget: $38 million (2009-2010)

Students and staff
- Students: 4,556 (2024-2025)
- Teachers: 258 (2024-2025)
- Staff: 379 (2024-2025)
- District mascot: Cardinal
- Colors: Columbia Blue, White, and Red

Other information
- Mission Statement: The mission of the Webb City R-VII School District is to prepare today’s youth to meet the challenges of tomorrow’s world by guiding all students in the acquisition of knowledge and the development of skills that will enable each to become a productive and responsible individual.
- Website: www.wcr7.org

The School District of Webb City R-7 (officially known as the Webb City R-7 School District and abbreviated WCR7) is a public school district headquartered in Webb City, Missouri, United States, consisting of 12 schools (a behavioral school, a pre-primary school, seven primary schools, two middle schools, and a secondary school). The Webb City R-7 School District was ranked 3rd nationally in its class in 2010. The school district is overseen by superintendent Dr. Brenten Byrd.

The district includes the majority of Webb City and Oronogo, all of Alba, Carterville, Neck City, and Purcell; portions of Airport Drive, Duenweg, Joplin, and Carl Junction; and some unincorporated portions of Jasper County (some portions of Webb City are served by the Joplin school district and a portion of Oronogo is served by the Carthage school district).

The district's sports programs have achieved significant success, with multiple championships in football, basketball, and other sports since 1989. The district also maintains a Hall of Fame to honor the accomplishments of its former students and staff from the Webb City, Alba, and Carterville school districts.

== History ==
The Webb City School District was established in 1877 to serve the growing town, which was founded the previous year due to the discovery of rich lead and zinc deposits. The establishment of Central School and the growth of the town's population led to the addition of more rooms and the creation of a four-year high school course by 1892. Students outside the Webb City district were educated in various one-room rural schools and smaller community high school districts.

The school district's first superintendent was Theodore Axline, who served from 1888 to 1890.

In 1968, the existing Webb City district was consolidated with the Alba and Carterville districts. The combined district was officially named Webb City R-7, encompassing what were once separate educational entities to provide better and more efficient educational programs for the area's students. The "R" stands for "reorganized", and "7" was the district's assigned number among districts across Missouri.

In 2004, the Webb City R-7 School District Foundation was established to support and advance the district's educational and enrichment programs.

== Schools ==
=== Behavioral ===
The Franklin Student Center (also known as the Franklin Behavioral Center) is a behavioral school for students in kindergarten through 12th grade who have behavior issues. It is located at 404 East Tracy Street in Webb City.

=== Heritage Early Childhood Center ===
The Heritage Early Childhood Center (also known as the Webb City Heritage Preschool or simply the Heritage Preschool, abbreviated HTG) is an early childhood education and parenting center for students in pre-kindergarten. It is located at 1020 North Webb Street in Webb City.

=== Elementary schools ===
In Webb City, the primary schools are categorized into outlying "country schools" and central schools. The central schools have students divided among different buildings based on grade sets: kindergarten, grades 1–2, and grades 3–4. In contrast, the outlying country schools accommodate students from kindergarten to fourth grade. The country schools are located in communities that once had their own school districts but were later integrated into the Webb City R-7 district. These schools serve as centers of their respective communities, where students typically walk to school, community events are hosted, and parents actively participate in classroom activities. When the grades were redistributed among different buildings, the two outlying country schools maintained their K-5 status, with the 5th grade eventually transitioning to the middle school.

==== Madge T. James Kindergarten Center ====
The Madge T. James Kindergarten Center (abbreviated MTJ) was named after Madge T. James, a former secretary to the Superintendent of Schools and Board of Education of the Webb City R-7 School District. The school serves students in the kindergarten grade, and is located at 211 West Aylor Street in Webb City. The school incorporates a gymnasium/storm shelter that opens to the public during severe weather.

==== Bess Truman Primary School ====
The Bess Truman Primary Center (also known as the Bess Truman Primary School, abbreviated BT) was named after Bess Truman, the wife of 33rd U.S. President Harry S. Truman, who served as First Lady of the United States under his presidency. The school serves students in kindergarten through first grade, and is located at 800 North Highway D in Webb City (near Oronogo).

==== Carterville Elementary School ====
The Carterville Elementary School (abbreviated CTV) serves students in kindergarten through fourth grade, and is located at 210 East Hall Street in Carterville. The school incorporates a gymnasium/storm shelter that opens to the public during severe weather.

==== Webster Primary Center ====
The Webster Primary Center (also known as the Webster School) serves students in the first and second grades, and is located at 704 North Main Street in Webb City.

==== Harry S. Truman Elementary School ====
The Harry S. Truman Elementary School (abbreviated HST) was named after Harry S. Truman, the 33rd President of the United States. The school serves students in second through fourth grade, and is located at 810 North Highway D in Webb City (near Oronogo). The school incorporates a gymnasium/storm shelter that opens to the public during severe weather.

==== Eugene Field Elementary School ====
The Eugene Field Elementary School (abbreviated EF) was named after Eugene Field, an American writer. The school serves students in the third and fourth grades, and is located at 510 South Oronogo Street in Webb City.

==== Mark Twain Elementary School ====
The Mark Twain Elementary School (abbreviated MT) was named after Mark Twain, an American author and humorist. The school serves students in the third and fourth grades, and is located at 1427 West Aylor Street in Webb City.

=== Webb City Middle School ===
The Webb City Middle School (also known as the 5th-6th Grade Center, abbreviated WCMS) serves students in the fifth and sixth grades, and is located at 603 West Aylor Street in Webb City. The school follows a middle school structure with classrooms organized into "pods", where four classrooms share a common area. There are four "pods" in both the 5th and 6th grade halls, totaling to 16 classrooms in one hall, and 32 classrooms across both grade levels. Students stay with their homeroom teacher for language arts and math instruction, while they rotate to different teachers for science and social studies.

The WCMS school campus, which was erected during the 1998-1999 school year and opened in April 1999, has various facilities including a gymnasium with locker rooms, an art room, a band room that also serves as a storm shelter, a vocal music room, two computer labs, and a library/media center. The commons area accommodates 2 pods during a lunch period, creating three separate lunches with recess for students.

=== Webb City Junior High School ===
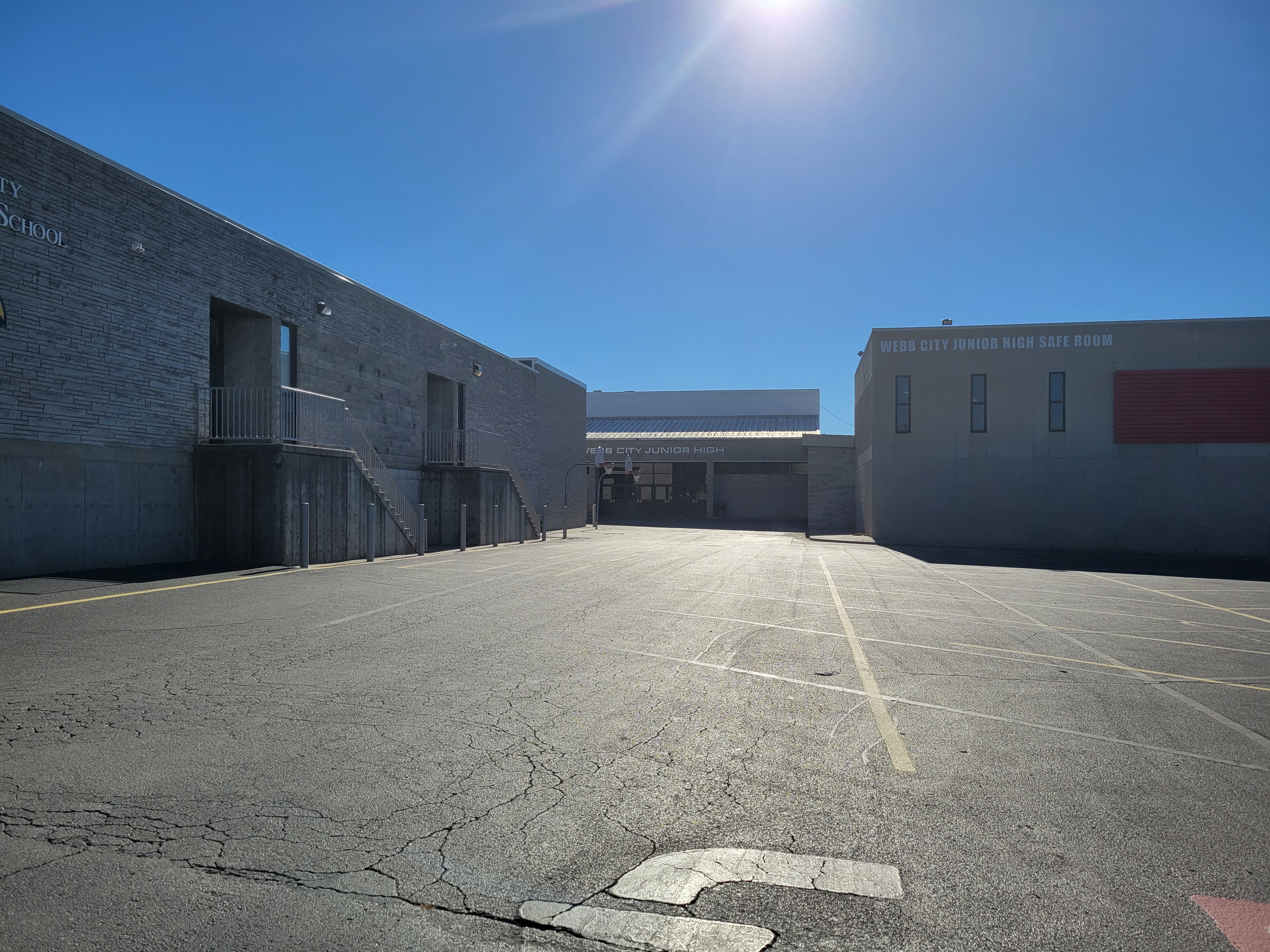
The exterior of Webb City Junior High School from the parking lot by the gymnasium and library/safe room

The Webb City Junior High School (abbreviated WCJH or WCJHS) serves students in the seventh and eighth grades, and is located at 807 West 1st Street in Webb City. A portion of the school's campus sits on the site of a building that was originally the high school, which was erected in 1909, opened in 1911, and demolished in 1974.

The school features various facilities including a gymnasium with locker rooms, a wrestling room, a shop room, a band room, a choir room, a performing arts room (abbreviated PAR), and a library and media center that also serves as a storm shelter, the latter being the most recent addition to the building. Prior to the erection of the current library/storm shelter in 2015, the library was housed in the room across from the cafeteria/commons area, which now houses the Boys and Girls Club and a tech office. To the south of the main entrance hallway, the school building encompasses two stories of classrooms tailored to various subjects, including math, science, reading, writing, social studies, communication arts, technology, and family and consumer science.

Webb City Junior High was recognized by Special Olympics Missouri as a Unified Champion School for its unified sports program and commitment to inclusion in 2022. The school's athletic program for students in 7th and 8th grade is devoted to preparing them for high school athletics.

The school district's junior high school was first established at Central School, where 8th-grade classes were organized. In 1920, 7th-grade students joined the 8th grade class at Central School to transition into a departmentalized high school structure. After Central School closed in 1931, grades 7 and 8 moved directly into the high school building. By 1933, the district combined the junior and senior high schools into a single 6-year operational system.

Webb City voters approved a $250,000 bond issue in October 1957 to construct a dedicated 10-classroom junior high building. Construction began on July 1, 1958 as Lawrence Miner began his term as the district's new superintendent. The new campus officially opened in March 1959 at the corner of 1st and Washington streets. The original two-story, 18,764-square-foot facility contained seven standard classrooms, a music room, and home economics spaces. Because the initial facility lacked standalone recreational spaces, junior high students initially shared the neighboring high school's cafeteria, gymnasium, and band room. To accommodate growing enrollment, a specialized annex building was added to the campus in 1965, followed by an independent junior high cafeteria and media center in 1983. In August 1993, to alleviate overcrowding in elementary schools by freeing up classroom space, the district completed a massive expansion that included four rooms and a 12-room wing, which served as a transitional school for the 6th grade class (also known as the 6th Grade Center) until it was moved to the newly-built middle school campus in April 1999, after which it was taken over by the 7th and 8th grades. Additional classrooms, a cafeteria/media center, and an elevator were added in 1995. Following a successful municipal bond push, the Board of Education added a modern, fully equipped athletic gymnasium to the campus footprint in 2000.

=== Webb City High School ===
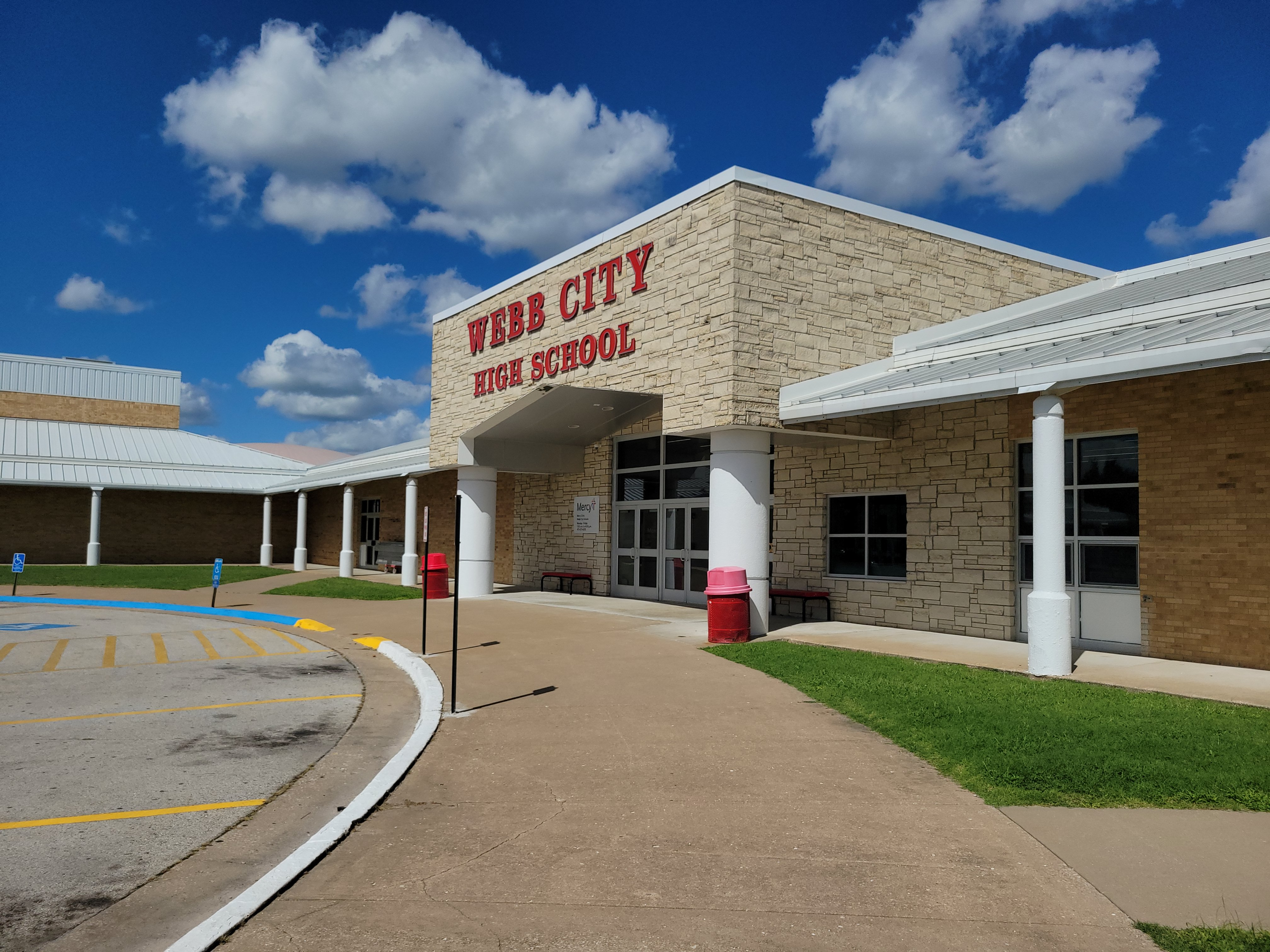
The main entrance of Webb City High School

The Webb City High School (abbreviated WCHS) serves students in ninth through twelfth grade, and is located at 621 North Madison Street in Webb City. The school is well known for its successful academic and athletic programs. In 2013, U.S. News & World Report ranked the school as the 17th best out of 560 high schools in Missouri. The school encompasses various facilities, including a gymnasium and storm shelter known as the Cardinal Dome (which opens to the public during severe weather), a football field known as the Cardinal Stadium, a swimming pool, a performing arts center, a library and media center, and a Mercy health clinic. WCHS has a highly successful athletic program that competes in the Central Ozark Conference and is governed by the Missouri State High School Activities Association (MSHSAA).

==== Webb City Alternative School ====
The Webb City Alternative School is an alternative high school that caters to non-traditional students who care for their children, work, or have problems in a regular learning environment. It is located at 600 Ellis Street in Webb City near the Crowder College campus.

== Recognition ==
In 2010, the district was ranked 3rd best nationally in communities with median home prices below $100,000. GreatSchools wrote: "The Webb City High School Cardinals are nearly invincible in football; they've won eleven state championships in the past 25 years. Academically, Webb City schools are recognized as an "outperformer" by Standard and Poor's because they've exceeded state expectations in 13 of the past 14 years. Webb City taxpayers are willing to invest in scholastic excellence — they recently approved a $2 million bond to build four additional classrooms."
