= Middle West Hotel =

- U.S. National Register of Historic Places
- U.S. Historic district – Contributing property
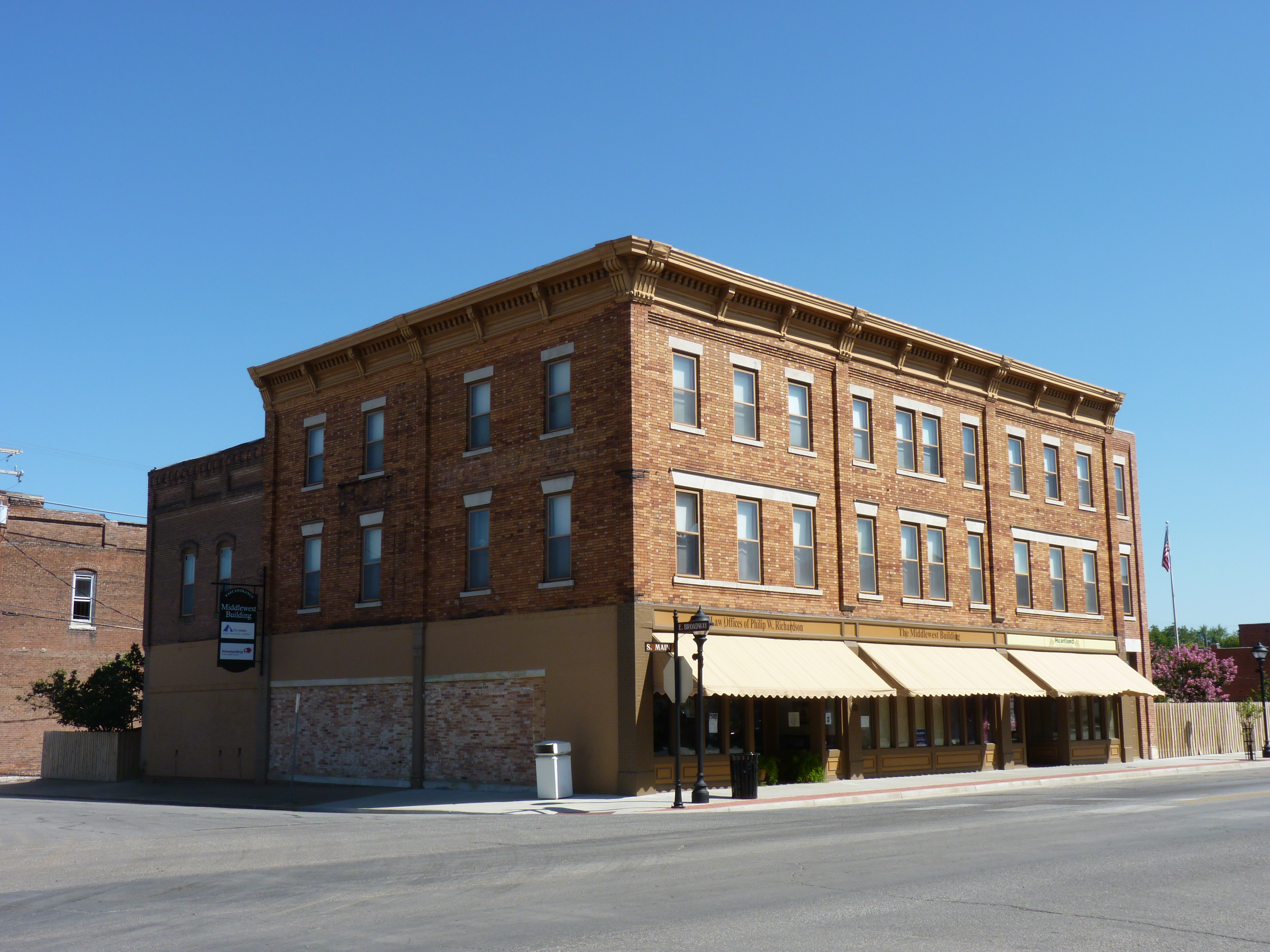

- Location within Missouri Location within the United States
- Location: 1 S. Main St., Webb City, Missouri
- Coordinates: 37°8′46″N 94°27′45″W
- Area: less than one acre
- Built: 1883, 1902
- Built by: Smith Brothers
- NRHP reference No.: 82003149
- Added to NRHP: September 16, 1982

Middle West Hotel, also known as Grand Opera House and Webb City Opera House, is a historic hotel building located at Webb City, Jasper County, Missouri. It was built in 1883, and housed an opera house. It was remodeled to its present form in 1902, and is a three-story, brick commercial building with brick corner pilasters and limestone trim.

It was listed on the National Register of Historic Places in 1982. It is located in the Downtown Webb City Historic District.
