= North Fork Spring River =

Stream in the U.S. state of Missouri

The North Fork Spring River is a stream in Lawrence, Dade, Barton and Jasper counties of southwest Missouri. It is a tributary to the Spring River.

The headwaters are located in northwest Lawrence County at 37°17′07″N 93°55′18″W and the confluence with the Spring River is in Jasper County at 37°16′11″N 94°32′08″W.

The stream source is an intermittent stream just south of the Dade-Lawrence county line and east of county road 1070. The stream flows west and then northwest crossing the county line and Missouri Route NN into Dade County just to the east of Missouri Route 97 and about one mile from the source. The stream crosses under Route 97 and flows northwest to exit Dade County and enter Barton County just east of Golden City. The stream flows north passing under U. S. Route 160 east of Golden City and again to the north as its course veers northwest. The stream crosses under 160 again as it passes northeast of Lamar. The stream turns to the west and the south as it passes Lamar and again passing under route 160 and flowing south paralleling U. S. Route 71. The stream crosses under Route 71 and flows south under Missouri Route 126 and on into Jasper County northwest of Jasper. The stream turns southwest passing north of Preston and meanders west past Neck City prior to its confluence with the Spring River west of the community of Galesburg. At Purcell, the river has a mean annual discharge of 507 cu ft/s (14.4 m^{3}/s).

The stream has historically been referred to as Dry Fork, Dry Fork Spring River, Muddy Creek, Muddy Fork Spring River and North Fork Creek.
