= Cloyd Boyer =

American baseball player (1927–2021)

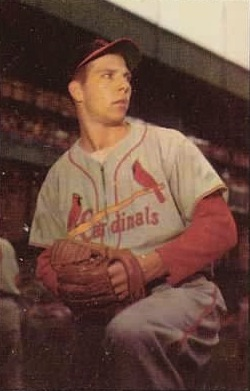
- Boyer c. 1952
- Pitcher
- Born: September 1, 1927; Alba, Missouri, U.S.
- Died: September 20, 2021 (aged 94); Carthage, Missouri, U.S.
- Batted: Right Threw: Right

MLB debut
- April 23, 1949, for the St. Louis Cardinals

Last MLB appearance
- September 24, 1955, for the Kansas City Athletics

MLB statistics
- Win–loss record: 20–23
- Earned run average: 4.73
- Strikeouts: 198
- Stats at Baseball Reference

Teams
- As player: St. Louis Cardinals (1949–1952); Kansas City Athletics (1955); As coach: New York Yankees (1975, 1977); Atlanta Braves (1978–1981); Kansas City Royals (1982–1983)

Career highlights and awards
- World Series champion (1977)

Cloyd Victor Boyer Jr. (September 1, 1927 – September 20, 2021) was an American professional baseball right-handed pitcher and coach in Major League Baseball (MLB) who played from 1949 and 1955 for the St. Louis Cardinals (1949–52) and the Kansas City Athletics (1955). Boyer was born in Alba, Missouri, the eldest son in a family that included Gold Glove Award-winning third basemen Ken and Clete Boyer.

Ken, 1964 National League Most Valuable Player, an 11-time Major League Baseball All-Star and five-time Gold Glove recipient, had a 15-year big-league career with the Cardinals, New York Mets, Chicago White Sox and Los Angeles Dodgers; Clete won only one Gold Glove because of the presence of Brooks Robinson, but played all or parts of 16 MLB seasons for the Athletics, New York Yankees and Atlanta Braves.

== Biography ==
In his major-league career, encompassing all or part of five seasons, Boyer posted a 20–23 won–lost record with 198 strikeouts and a 4.73 earned run average in 395 2/3 innings pitched, including 13 complete games, three shutouts, and two saves. Boyer also played for the Duluth Dukes, a Cardinals minor league team, in 1947. That year, Boyer compiled a record of 16 wins against 9 losses. He struck out 239 and took the strikeout lead in the Northern League. After that season, he was promoted to the Cardinals' Double-A club, the Houston Buffaloes, for whom he played in 1948.

After his playing career finished, Boyer became a scout, minor league pitching instructor and major league pitching coach—spending much of his time in the New York Yankees' organization. He spent two brief terms as pitching coach of the Bombers in 1975 and 1977, and held the same post on the staff of Bobby Cox during Cox's first term (1978–1981) as manager of the Atlanta Braves, then served under Dick Howser as mound tutor of the 1982–1983 Kansas City Royals.

Boyer died in Carthage, Missouri, on September 20, 2021. At the time, he was the 18th oldest former Major League Baseball player at 94 years, 19 days old.

Preceded by Whitey Ford	New York Yankees pitching coach 1975	Succeeded by Art Fowler
Preceded by Johnny Sain	Atlanta Braves pitching coach 1978–1981	Succeeded by Rube Walker
Preceded by Billy Connors	Kansas City Royals pitching coach 1982–1983	Succeeded by Gary Blaylock
