= Webb City High School =

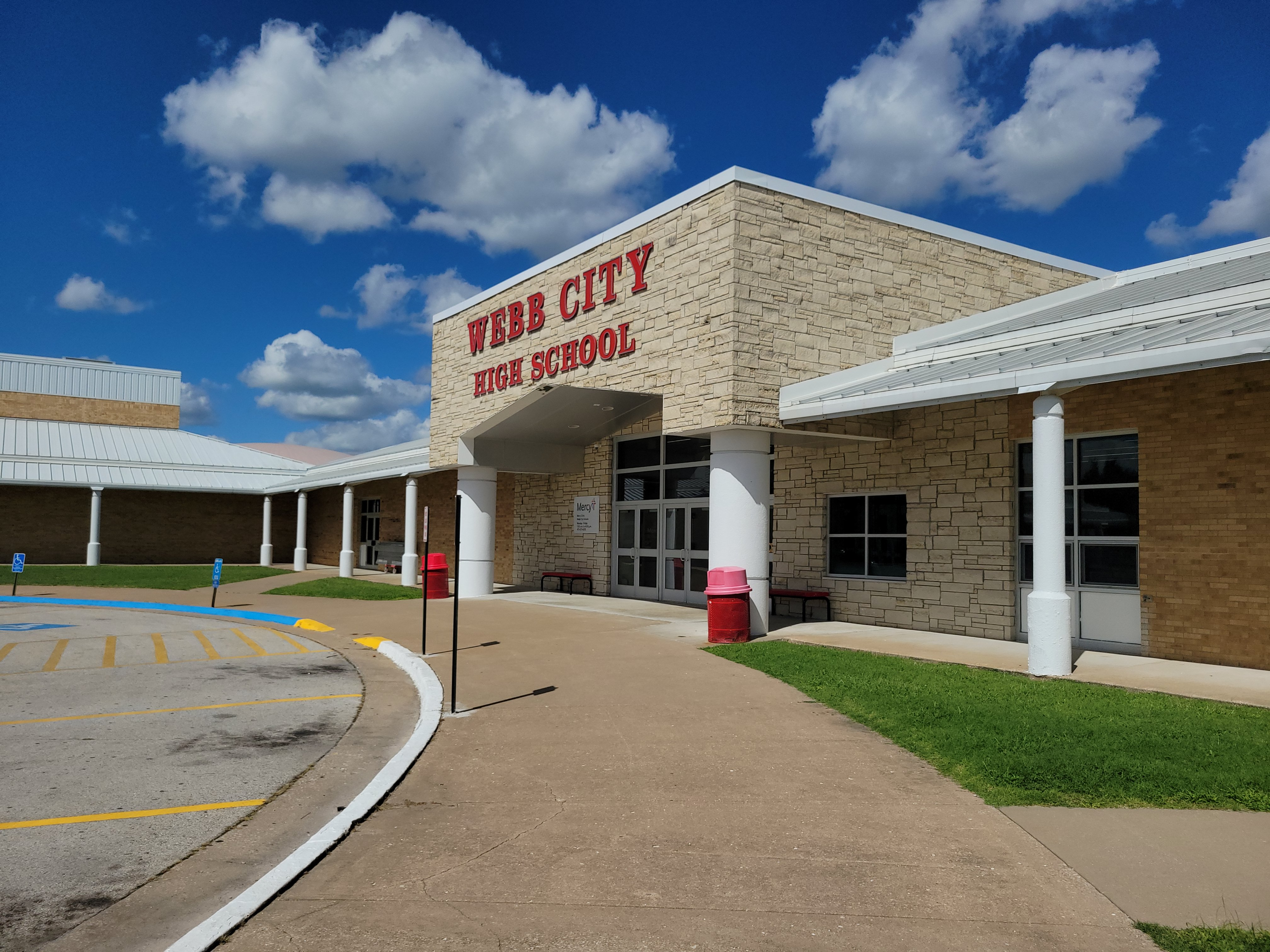
- The main entrance of Webb City High School

Location
- 621 North Madison Street; Webb City, Missouri 64870; United States; 37°09′06″N 94°28′23″W

Information
- Type: Public Secondary
- Established: 1877 (1968 current building)
- Oversight: Webb City R-7
- Principal: Jeff Wilkie
- Faculty: 77
- Grades: 9-12
- Enrollment: 1,381 (2024-2025)
- Student to teacher ratio: 15:1
- Campus type: Suburban/Rural
- Colors: Columbia Blue, White, and Red
- Athletics: Boys' Soccer; Football; Cross country; Volleyball; Girls' Tennis; Girls' Softball; Girls' Golf; Boys' Diving & Swimming; Girls' Diving & Swimming; Boys' Basketball; Wrestling; Girls' Basketball; Boys' Baseball, Boys' Tennis; Boys' Golf; Track and Field; Girls' Soccer
- Athletics conference: Central Ozark Conference
- Mascot: Cardinal
- Website: Webb City H.S.

Webb City High School (abbreviated WCHS) is a public high school in the School District of Webb City R-7 located in Webb City, Missouri, founded in 1877. Webb City High School serves students in grades 9 through 12, and is a part of Missouri State High School Activities Association (MSHSAA), the governing body for high school activities throughout the state of Missouri.

Webb City High School was ranked as the 17th best high school out of 560 in the state of Missouri in the 2013 U.S. News & World Report. The school is highly rated academically. The school is well known for its academic activities including Speech and Debate, Academic Bowl, and Future Business Leaders of America. Its marching band has been very successful in competition and was invited to perform in the 2006 and 2010 Rose Parade. The high school is perhaps best known for its sports program which has won sixteen football championships, two baseball and softball championships, and one championship in boys' and girls' basketball since 1989.

== Location and campus ==
The first Webb City schoolhouse was built in 1877 at the corner of Webb and Joplin (now Broadway) streets. This building was called "Central School", and started with four rooms. In 1889, four more rooms were added to Central School, bringing the total number of rooms to eight, and a high school was established, which occupied one room of the school. Originally, the high school course was only two years' work. However, by 1892 the course was extended to four years due to population growth. Until 1890, Central School was the only school in Webb City. In 1892, West Side School was built and the high school was moved there, occupying one room of the building. Two area churches were also used as high school classrooms during this time.

In 1894, the original wood frame Central School that faced Webb Street was replaced by a brick structure to the west on Joplin Street known as "Central High School". The high school occupied three rooms of the new building until 1911.

In 1911, a new high school, located on Joplin Street, was opened and grades 9 through 12 were moved there. This building was erected in 1909, opened in 1911, and served as the high school until 1972. This building currently houses the district's junior high school serving grades 7 and 8.

The current high school, located at 621 North Madison (on the site of the old Hatton Athletic Field), was built in 1972. It was expanded in the years 1973, 1975, 1983, 1987, 1994, 1997, 1999, 2004, 2009, 2015, 2017, 2021, and 2023. A gymnasium and a storm shelter in a dome shape located near the north entrance of the high school campus, known as the "Cardinal Dome", was added in 2015. The most recent addition to the campus, completed in August 2023, included a family and consumer science (FACS) lab, two science labs, a standard-size classroom, a learning lab, gender-neutral restrooms, support spaces, and a new E-sports facility. The addition also joins the main building to the swimming center with a new entrance. This 19,000 square foot addition replaced the school's old tennis courts, which were supplanted by the newer tennis courts to the north of the campus on Stadium Drive. This was outlined in a bond issue allocating funds for renovations at Webb City High School that was passed by Webb City School District in April 2022.

A clock tower, known as the Heritage Clock Tower, is located at the southwest corner of the high school campus near the faculty parking lot.

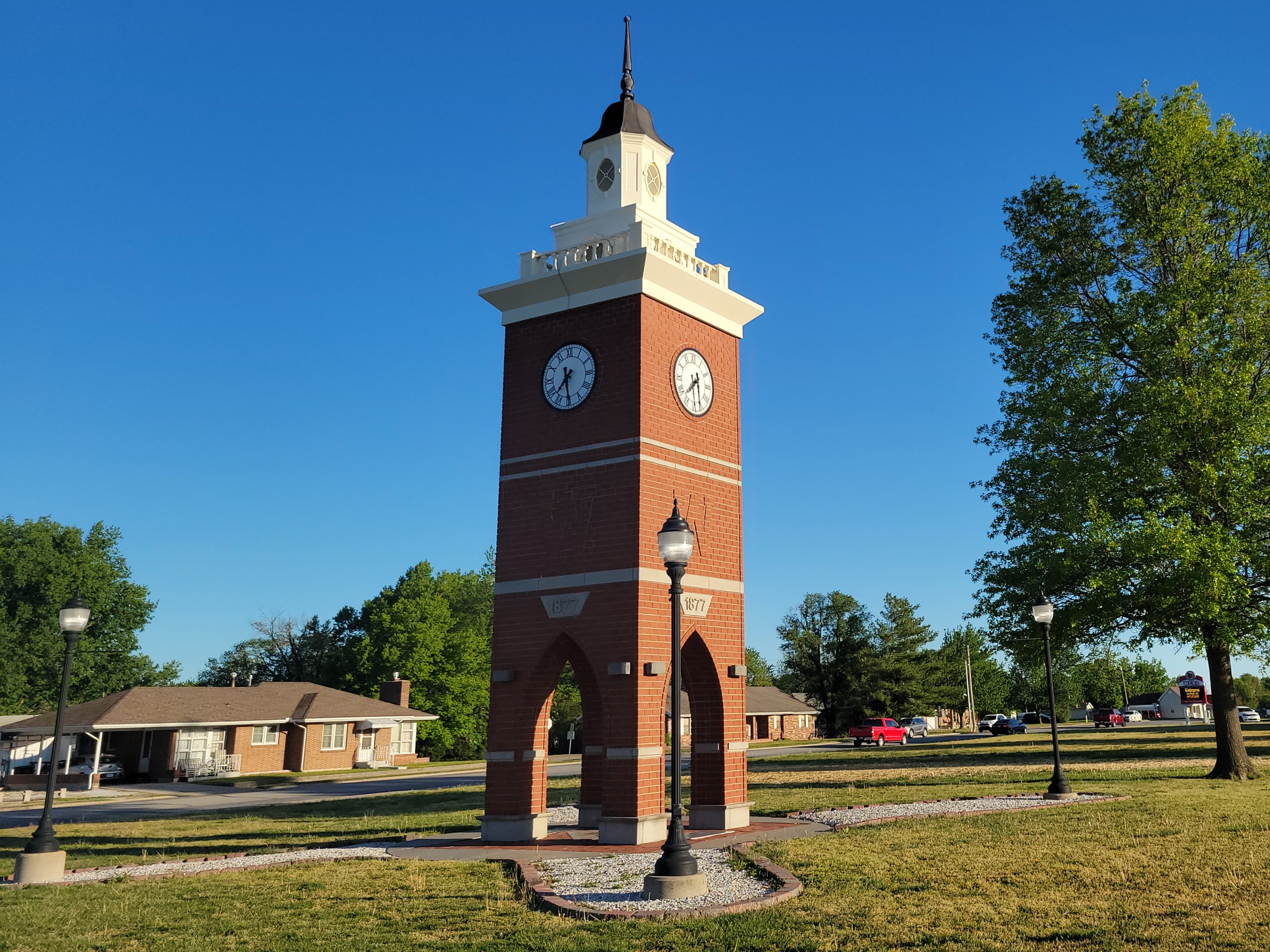
The Heritage Clock Tower

== Athletics ==
Its football team has won 16 Missouri state football championships, in the years 1989, 1992, 1993, 1997, 2000, 2001, 2006, 2008, 2010, 2011, 2012, 2013, 2014, 2017, 2019 and 2021.

== Performing arts ==
WCHS has three competitive show choirs, the mixed-gender "Singers", women's-only "Bella Vocé" and men's-only "DoMENance". The school also hosts its own competition every year, the Webb City Showcase.

== Notable people ==
=== Alumni ===
- Brian Bond - LGBT advocate and member of the Obama administration
- Clete Boyer - professional baseball player (MLB) 1959–1969, member of the 1961 and 1962 New York Yankee World Championship team; Class of 1955
- Cloyd Boyer - professional baseball player (MLB) 1949–1955, St. Louis Cardinals and Kansas City Athletics; Class of 1945
- Ken Boyer - professional baseball player (MLB), St. Louis Cardinals; National League MVP and World Series championship in 1964; Class of 1949
- Trystan Colon - NFL player; Class of 2016
- Zach Davidson- NFL player; Class of 2016
- James Jordan, film and television actor; Class of 1997
- Lisa Myers - NBC News Senior Investigative Correspondent; Class of 1969
- Andrew Shull - former football player at Kansas State
- Hugh Sprinkle - NFL player
- Grant Wistrom - retired professional football player (NFL); Class of 1994
- Grace Steele Woodward, writer and historian; Class of 1917

=== Faculty ===
- Jerry Kill - former football coach
- John Roderique - former football coach and alumnus; Class of 1985
