= National Register of Historic Places listings in Jasper County, Missouri =

Location of Jasper County in Missouri

This is a list of the National Register of Historic Places listings in Jasper County, Missouri.

This is intended to be a complete list of the properties and districts on the National Register of Historic Places in Jasper County, Missouri, United States. Latitude and longitude coordinates are provided for many National Register properties and districts; these locations may be seen together in a map.

There are 43 properties and districts listed on the National Register in the county.

This National Park Service list is complete through NPS recent listings posted April 17, 2026.

== Current listings ==
	Name on the Register	Image	Date listed	Location	City or town	Description
1	66 Drive-In	66 Drive-In	April 2, 2003 (#03000182)	17231 Old 66 Boulevard; 37°10′24″N 94°22′06″W	Carthage vicinity	
2	Bank of Avilla	Bank of Avilla	March 7, 2022 (#100007497)	205 Greenfield St. 37°11′45″N 94°07′48″W	Avilla	
3	Boots Court	Boots Court	September 26, 2022 (#100008202)	107 South Garrison Ave. 37°10′42″N 94°18′51″W	Carthage	
4	Lucius P. Buchanan House		August 22, 2016 (#16000546)	3708 E. University Pkwy. 37°05′47″N 94°27′51″W	Joplin	Now the Ralph L. Gray Alumni Center of Missouri Southern State University
5	Carthage Courthouse Square Historic District	Carthage Courthouse Square Historic District	May 15, 1980 (#80002370)	Roughly bounded by E. Central Ave., S. Maple, Lincoln, and W. 5th Sts. 37°10′36″N 94°18′37″W	Carthage	
6	Carthage South Historic District	Carthage South Historic District	May 6, 1982 (#82004915)	City limits of Carthage; 37°10′08″N 94°18′38″W	Carthage	
7	Cassill Place Historic District	Cassill Place Historic District	January 2, 1986 (#86000005)	Roughly the first half-block of W. Central east of Blanche St. 37°10′44″N 94°19′13″W	Carthage	
8	Cave Spring School and Cave Spring Cemetery	Cave Spring School and Cave Spring Cemetery	July 17, 2012 (#12000416)	4323 Cty. Rd. 4; 37°06′43″N 94°03′45″W	Sarcoxie location	
9	Cleveland Apartments		December 23, 2021 (#100007261)	801-807 West 1st St. and 104 North Jackson Ave. 37°05′27″N 94°31′17″W	Joplin	
10	Colonial Apartments	Colonial Apartments	August 14, 2001 (#01000835)	406 Walnut St. 37°10′29″N 94°18′51″W	Carthage	
11	Downtown Webb City Historic District	Downtown Webb City Historic District	July 18, 2014 (#14000427)	Roughly N. and S. Main, E. and W. Broadway, Daugherty, E. Church, N. Tom, N. Liberty, and N. and S. Webb; 37°08′48″N 94°27′50″W	Webb City	
12	Elks Club Lodge No. 501	Elks Club Lodge No. 501	June 3, 1985 (#85001188)	318-320 W. 4th St. 37°05′15″N 94°30′58″W	Joplin	
13	Fifth and Main Historic District	Fifth and Main Historic District	July 5, 2006 (#06000541)	501-513 S. Main St., 502-508 Virginia St. 37°05′19″N 94°30′48″W	Joplin	
14	Fox Theater	Fox Theater	July 30, 1990 (#90001100)	415 S. Main St. 37°05′18″N 94°30′51″W	Joplin	
15	Gentry Apartments	Gentry Apartments	August 8, 2006 (#06000683)	318 S. Wall St. 37°05′23″N 94°30′57″W	Joplin	
16	Inter-State Grocers Coffee Building		January 29, 2026 (#100012642)	927-929 S. Virginia Ave. 37°04′51″N 94°30′45″W	Joplin	
17	Inter-State Grocer Company Building	Inter-State Grocer Company Building	October 24, 2008 (#08001024)	1027-1035 S. Main St. 37°04′45″N 94°30′48″W	Joplin	
18	Jasper County Courthouse	Jasper County Courthouse	February 8, 1973 (#73001041)	Courthouse Sq. 37°10′45″N 94°18′37″W	Carthage	
19	Joplin and Wall Avenues Historic District	Joplin and Wall Avenues Historic District	October 12, 2010 (#10000819)	Portions of S. Joplin and Wall Aves., W. First, Second, Third Sts. 37°05′23″N 94°30′53″W	Joplin	Includes the U.S. Post Office and Courthouse
20	Joplin Carnegie Library	Joplin Carnegie Library	July 10, 1979 (#79001377)	9th and Wall Sts. 37°04′55″N 94°30′57″W	Joplin	
21	Joplin Connor Hotel		February 28, 1973 (#73001042)	324 Main St. 37°05′17″N 94°30′49″W	Joplin	Demolished.
22	Joplin Downtown Historic District	Joplin Downtown Historic District	July 16, 2008 (#08000661)	S. Main St., roughly between E. 4th and E. 6th Sts. 37°05′12″N 94°30′48″W	Joplin	
23	Joplin East Town Historic District		November 2, 2022 (#100008307)	Roughly bounded by Broadway Langston Hughes, Landreth Ave., Hill St., and Division Ave; 37°05′31″N 94°30′22″W	Joplin	
24	Joplin Furniture Company Building		August 7, 2012 (#12000473)	702-708 Main St. 37°05′02″N 94°30′49″W	Joplin	
25	Joplin Supply Company	Joplin Supply Company	July 3, 2007 (#07000652)	228 S. Joplin Ave. 37°05′20″N 94°30′52″W	Joplin	
26	Joplin Union Depot	Joplin Union Depot	March 14, 1973 (#73001043)	Broadway and Main St. 37°05′30″N 94°30′42″W	Joplin	
27	Joplin YMCA		January 19, 2022 (#100007358)	510 South Wall Ave. 37°05′12″N 94°30′57″W	Joplin	
28	Main and Eighth Streets Historic District	Main and Eighth Streets Historic District	April 15, 2011 (#11000185)	Portions of the 800 and 900 block of S. Main St. 37°04′53″N 94°30′49″W	Joplin	
29	Memorial Hall		October 7, 2021 (#100007039)	212 West 8th St. 37°04′58″N 94°30′55″W	Joplin	
30	Middle West Hotel	Middle West Hotel	September 16, 1982 (#82003149)	1 S. Main St. 37°08′46″N 94°27′45″W	Webb City	
31	Murphysburg Historic District		May 18, 2015 (#15000228)	Roughly bounded by S. Sergeant, S. Pearl & S. Byers Aves., W. 1st, W. 4th & W. 7th Sts. 37°05′08″N 94°31′05″W	Joplin	
32	Newman Brothers Building	Newman Brothers Building	July 23, 1990 (#90001101)	602-608 S. Main St. 37°05′07″N 94°30′45″W	Joplin	
33	Olivia Apartments	Olivia Apartments	June 20, 2008 (#08000536)	320 Moffet Ave. 37°05′19″N 94°31′08″W	Joplin	
34	Pennington Drug Company		October 10, 2017 (#100001742)	512-520 Virginia Ave. 37°05′10″N 94°30′44″W	Joplin	
35	Phelps Country Estate	Phelps Country Estate	August 29, 1983 (#83001023)	RR 1, Newcastle Rd. just west of CR100; 37°15′00″N 94°14′10″W	Carthage vicinity	
36	Rains Brothers Building	Rains Brothers Building	July 19, 1990 (#90001102)	906-908 S. Main St. 37°04′52″N 94°30′44″W	Joplin	Destroyed by fire March 1, 2012
37	Ridgway Apartments	Ridgway Apartments	August 8, 2006 (#06000682)	402 S. Byers Ave. and 404 S. Byers Ave. 37°05′22″N 94°31′05″W	Joplin	
38	St. Louis and San Francisco Railroad Building	St. Louis and San Francisco Railroad Building	October 22, 2002 (#02001193)	605 Main St. 37°05′09″N 94°30′47″W	Joplin	
39	St. Peter the Apostle Catholic Church and Rectory	St. Peter the Apostle Catholic Church and Rectory	June 28, 1991 (#91000851)	812 Pearl St. 37°04′58″N 94°31′01″W	Joplin	
40	Sarcoxie Public Square Historic District	Sarcoxie Public Square Historic District	October 20, 2014 (#14000872)	Along 5th, 6th, Center & Cross Sts. 37°04′09″N 94°07′00″W	Sarcoxie	
41	Scottish Rite Cathedral	Scottish Rite Cathedral	June 21, 1990 (#90000989)	505 Byers Ave. 37°05′11″N 94°31′02″W	Joplin	
42	South Main Street Historic District	South Main Street Historic District	October 12, 2010 (#10000818)	Western side of S. Main St., between W. First and W. Second Sts. 37°05′24″N 94°30′48″W	Joplin	
43	Elijah Thomas Webb House	Elijah Thomas Webb House	July 20, 2020 (#100005346)	4 South Liberty St. 37°08′45″N 94°27′55″W	Webb City	

== See also ==
- List of National Historic Landmarks in Missouri
- National Register of Historic Places listings in Missouri
