= Phelps House =

Phelps House may refer to:

in the United States

(by state, then city)

- Phelps-Jones House, Huntsville, Alabama, listed on the National Register of Historic Places (NRHP) in Huntsville, Alabama
- Abner Phelps House, San Francisco, California, listed on the NRHP in San Francisco, California
- Phelps Farms Historic District, Colebrook, Connecticut, listed on the NRHP in Litchfield County, Connecticut
- Ezekiel Phelps House, East Granby, Connecticut, NRHP-listed
- Arah Phelps Inn, North Colebrook, Connecticut, listed on the NRHP in Litchfield County, Connecticut
- Capt. Elisha Phelps House, Simsbury, Connecticut, NRHP-listed
- Eli Phelps House, Windsor, Connecticut, listed on the NRHP in Hartford County, Connecticut
- Seth Ledyard Phelps House, Washington, DC, listed on the NRHP in Washington, DC
- Alexis Phelps House, Oquawka, Illinois, NRHP-listed
- Porter-Phelps-Huntington House, Hadley, Massachusetts, NRHP-listed
- Phelps House (North Adams, Massachusetts), listed on the National Register of Historic Places in Berkshire County, Massachusetts
- Laflin-Phelps Homestead, Southwick, Massachusetts, NRHP-listed
- Phelps Country Estate, Carthage, Missouri, listed on the NRHP in Jasper County, Missouri
- Phelps Mansion, Binghamton, New York, NRHP-listed
- Ezra T. Phelps Farm Complex, Marion, New York, NRHP-listed
- Dubois-Phelps House, Montgomery, New York, NRHP-listed
- Stephen Phelps House, Penfield, New York, NRHP-listed
- Phelps House (Aiken, South Carolina), NRHP-listed
