= Gentry House =

Gentry House may refer to:

- Gentry House (Danville, Kentucky), listed on the National Register of Historic Places in Boyle County, Kentucky
- William T. Gentry House, Atlanta, Georgia, listed on the National Register of Historic Places listings in DeKalb County, Georgia
- William H. Gentry House, Sedalia, Missouri, listed on the National Register of Historic Places in Pettis County, Missouri
- Payne-Gentry House, Bridgeton, Missouri, listed on the # National Register of Historic Places in St. Louis County, Missouri

== See also ==
- Gentry Apartments, Joplin, Missouri, listed on the National Register of Historic Places in Jasper County, Missouri
- Sharpe-Gentry Farm, Propst Crossroads, North Carolina, listed on the National Register of Historic Places in Catawba County, North Carolina
