= St. Louis and San Francisco Railroad Building =

St. Louis and San Francisco Railroad Building or variations with Depot may refer to:

- St. Louis and San Francisco Railroad Building (Joplin, Missouri), listed on the National Register of Historic Places (NRHP)
- St. Louis-San Francisco Railroad Depot (Poplar Bluff, Missouri), NRHP-listed
- St. Louis and San Francisco Railway Depot (Comanche, Texas), NRHP-listed
