= Elks Club Lodge No. 501 =

- Elks Club Lodge #501
- U.S. National Register of Historic Places
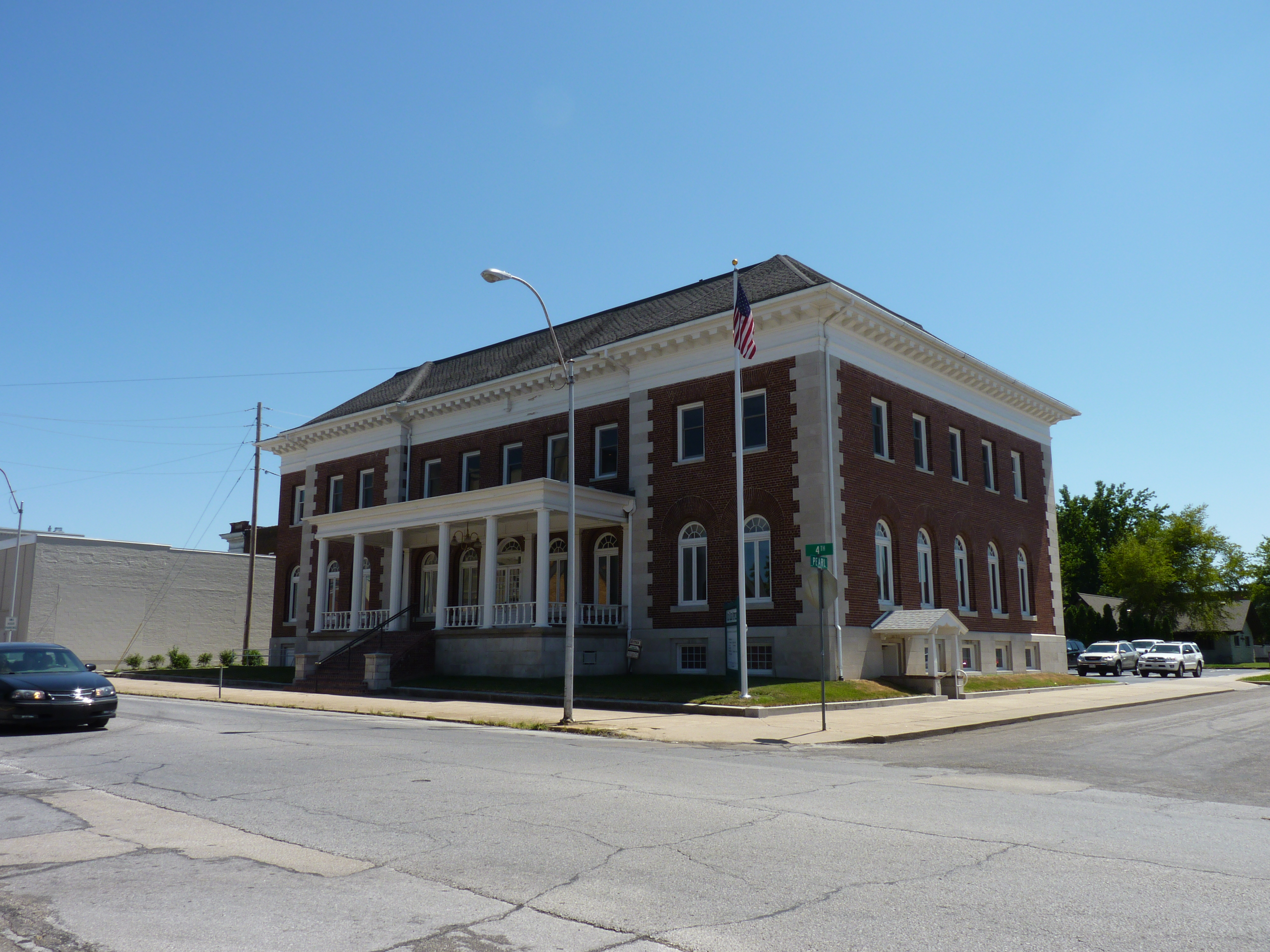
- North elevation and west profile in 2010.

- Location within Missouri Location within the United States
- Location: 318–320 W. 4th St., Joplin, Missouri
- Coordinates: 37°5′15″N 94°30′58″W
- Area: less than one acre
- Built: 1904
- Architect: Allen, Austin
- Architectural style: Colonial Revival, Georgian Revival
- NRHP reference No.: 85001188
- Added to NRHP: June 3, 1985

The Elks Club Lodge No. 501 is a historic Elks Lodge located at Joplin, Jasper County, Missouri. It was built in 1904–1905, and is a two-story brick and stone hip roofed building designed in Colonial Revival / Georgian Revival architectural styles. It measures 102 feet by 62 feet and features a columned portico flanked by two slightly projecting bays accentuated by limestone quoins.

It was listed on the National Register of Historic Places in 1985.

== See also ==
- List of Elks buildings
- National Register of Historic Places listings in Jasper County, Missouri
