= Cassill Place Historic District =

Historic district in Missouri, United States

- U.S. National Register of Historic Places
- U.S. Historic district
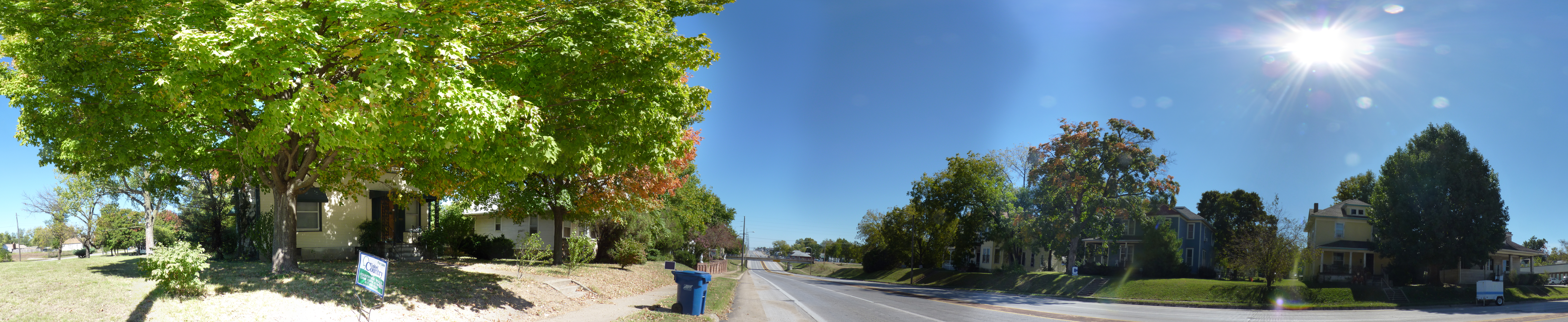
- Cassill Place Historic District, October 2010

- Location within Missouri Location within the United States
- Location: W. Central, Carthage, Missouri
- Coordinates: 37°10′44″N 94°19′13″W
- Area: 0 acres (0 ha)
- Built by: Bistline, G.
- Architectural style: Bungalow/craftsman, Late Victorian
- MPS: City of Carthage MRA
- NRHP reference No.: 86000005
- Added to NRHP: January 2, 1986

Cassill Place Historic District is a national historic district located at Carthage, Jasper County, Missouri. The district encompasses eight contributing buildings in an exclusively residential section Carthage. It developed between about 1890 and 1925 and includes representative examples of Late Victorian and Bungalow / American Craftsman style architecture. The buildings include the Macoubrie House (1903), Former Herrin Home (c. 1890), Fenimore House (c. 1890), McFadden House (c. 1925), Meister House (c. 1890), A. H. McFadden House (1914), Former Eugene O'Keefe House (c. 1893), and Dennison House (c. 1914).

It was listed on the National Register of Historic Places in 1986.
