= Inter-State Grocer Company Building =

- U.S. National Register of Historic Places
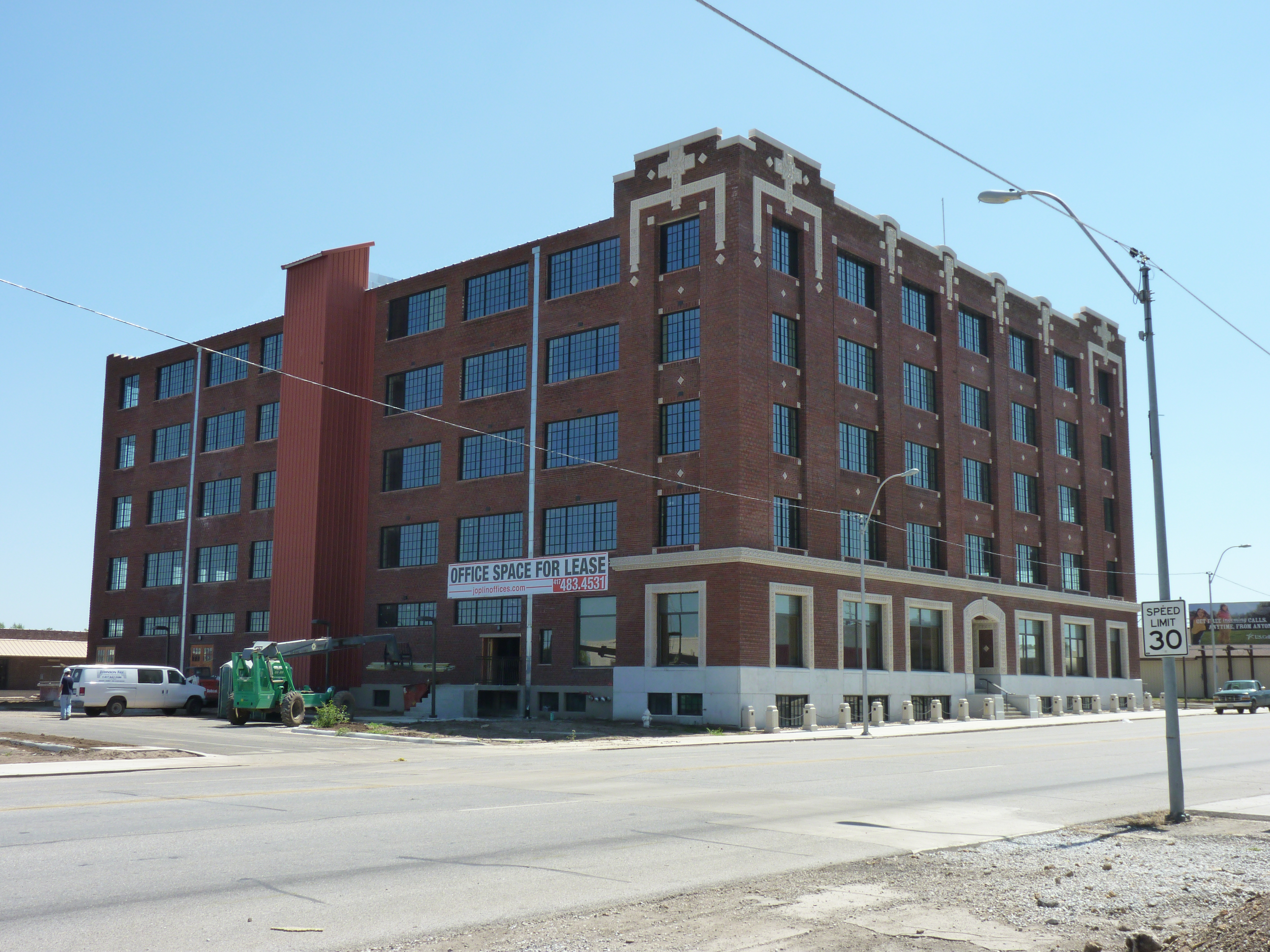

- Location within Missouri Location within the United States
- Location: 1027-1035 S. Main St., Joplin, Missouri
- Coordinates: 37°4′52″N 94°30′47″W
- Area: 1.1 acres (0.45 ha)
- Built: 1915
- Built by: Bane and Hoffman
- Architect: McKecknie, John W.
- Architectural style: Factory and warehouse
- MPS: Historic Resources of Joplin, Missouri
- NRHP reference No.: 08001024
- Added to NRHP: October 24, 2008

Inter-State Grocer Company Building, also known as Bagcraft Building, is a historic factory and warehouse located at Joplin, Jasper County, Missouri. It was built in 1915, and is a five-story fireproof wholesale distribution and food processing building constructed of reinforced concrete with tapestry brick cladding and terra cotta ornamentation. Also on the property is a contributing one-story brick garage (c. 1920).

It was listed on the National Register of Historic Places in 2008.

The building, now known as the Gryphon Building, was completely renovated in 2010 and is now used as a multi-tenant office space.
