= Sharpe–Gentry Farm =

Historic farm in North Carolina, United States

- Sharpe-Gentry Farm
- U.S. National Register of Historic Places
- U.S. Historic district
- Location within North Carolina Location within the United States
- Location: Junction of NC 10 and SR 1137, near Propst Crossroads, North Carolina
- Coordinates: 35°37′41″N 81°22′22″W
- Area: 28 acres (11 ha)
- Built: c. 1903
- Architectural style: Queen Anne
- MPS: Catawba County MPS
- NRHP reference No.: 90000859
- Added to NRHP: June 21, 1990

Sharpe–Gentry Farm, also known as the John O. Sharpe Farm, is a historic farm and national historic district located near Propst Crossroads, Catawba County, North Carolina. The district encompasses 6 contributing buildings and 1 contributing site. The house was built about 1903, and is a 1 1/2-story, Queen Anne style frame farmhouse. Also on the property are the contributing engine room (c. 1923), shed, granary, garage, and barn.

It was added to the National Register of Historic Places in 1990.
