= Fifth and Main Historic District =

Historic district in Missouri, United States

- U.S. National Register of Historic Places
- U.S. Historic district
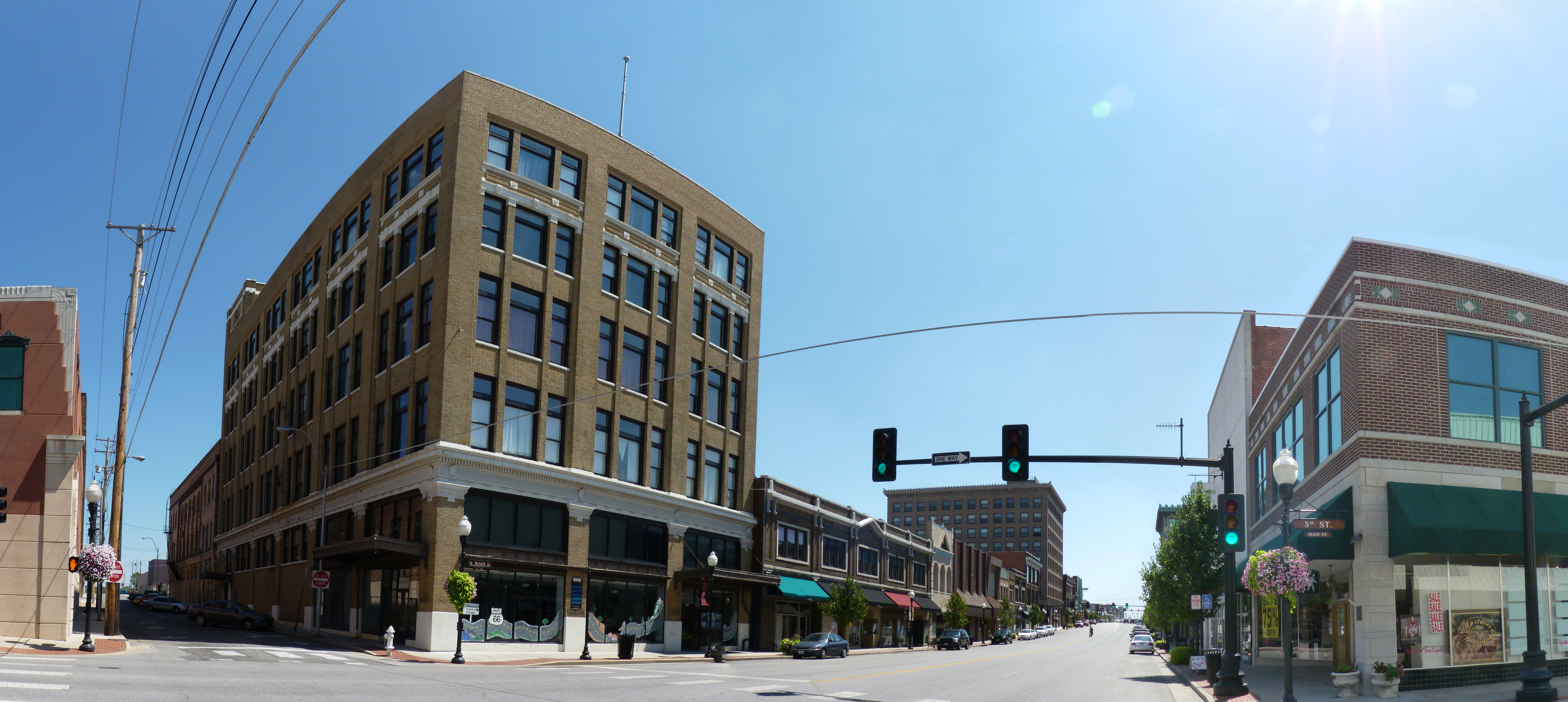
- North elevation and west profile in 2010.

- Location within Missouri Location within the United States
- Location: 501-505 S. Main Street; 507-513 S. Main Street; 502-506 S. Virginia Ave. Joplin, Missouri
- Coordinates: 37°5′15″N 94°30′58″W
- Area: about one acre
- Built: 1903-1920
- Architect: August and Alfred Michaelis; Alfred W. Rea
- Architectural style: Chicago Style
- NRHP reference No.: 06000541
- Added to NRHP: July 5, 2006

The Fifth and Main Historic District is a collection of adjoining structures and national historic district located on the northeast corner of the intersection of Main and Fifth streets in Joplin, Jasper County, Missouri, United States. This historic district consists of three early 20th-century structures: the Christman Building, the Christman Building Annex and the Paramount Building. The Fifth and Main Historic District was added to the National Register of Historic Places in 2006. In 2008, it was encompassed by the Joplin Downtown Historic District.

== Christman Building ==
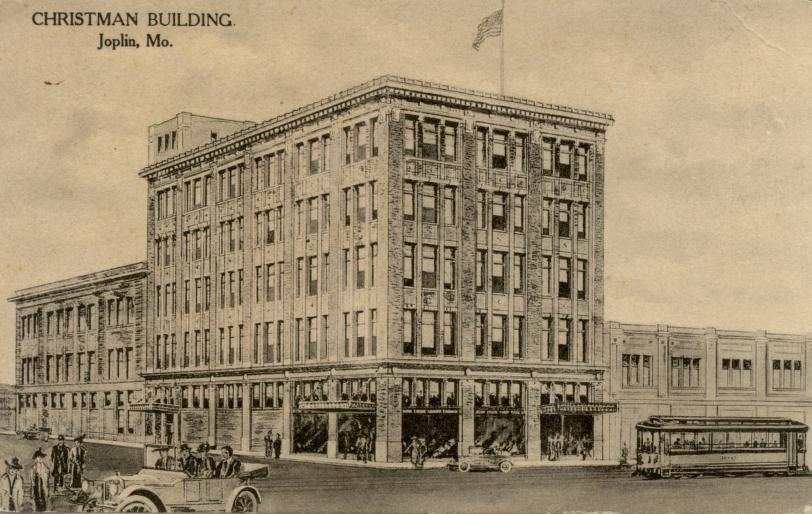
A postcard drawing of the Christman Dry Goods Company as it appeared at the time it was built in 1917.

The Christman Building at 501-505 South Main Street is the most prominent building of the Fifth and Main Historic District. It stands five stories, not including the mezzanine level, and dominates the corner of Fifth and Main streets, with elevations and entrances facing both streets. It has brick walls, a concrete foundation and a flat roof. It has brown brick and light terra cotta on the main elevations, and red brick on secondary wall surfaces. The main retail space near the front doors features a large room that is two stories tall, with mezzanine spaces at the front and back that are linked by a narrow balcony along the north wall. The room features two rows of monumental square columns that are topped with egg and dart molding, and adorned with large shield-shaped medallions that feature the letter "C" for Christman. That room takes up almost all of the ground floor; the rest of the space contains an elevator lobby and formal staircase for access to the upper floors. It was built in 1917 to house the Christman Dry Goods Company, which had occupied a previous three-story building on that site.

The building was designed by August and Alfred Michaelis and is an example of the Chicago style of curtain-wall architecture. The Christman Dry Goods Company, which was first founded in 1890 by Peter A. Christman and Edmund Bliedung as Christman and Bliedung but renamed Christman Dry Goods Company in 1903, remained in the building until 1954 when R.H. Macy & Co. Inc. purchased the business and all its fixtures from the Christman family, though the Christman's did retain ownership of the building. For a short time Macy's operated the store under the Christman name, but within two years they had branded the location with the Macy's moniker. On January 8, 1976 Macy's closed its Joplin store, leaving the Christman Building vacant for the first time in its 59-year history. The Christman family, who still owned the building, then leased the building and the family name to Gregg Athy and Richard Roberds, both former Macy's employees. Athy and Roberds opened the new Christman's Department Store in the building on October 7, 1976, but the business closed after only a few years. Eventually Hugh and Lee Anne Howsman purchased the building to house their Howsman's Office Supply and Furniture Co. Over time Howsman's business plan changed and in 2006 they sold the building to the Matt Miller Co. of Springfield, Missouri, who redeveloped the upper stories into lofts and restored the main floor into an events space.

== Christman Building Annex ==
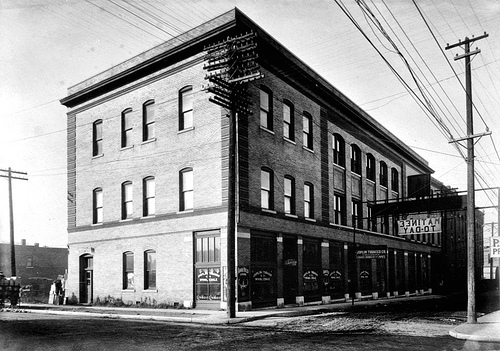
The 1903 annex for the Christman Building, this image predates the 1920 addition to the building.

The Christman Building Annex, which is attached to the back of the Christman Building and sits on the southeast corner of Virginia Avenue and Fifth Street, is actually two separate sections. The north section of the annex was built in 1903 and designed by the architect Alfred W. Rea of the Garstang & Rea firm as an addition to the previous Christman Dry Goods Company structure, while the south section was built in 1920, after the 1917 Christman Building had been completed. Together, they measure roughly 100 feet wide and 120 feet deep. The northern section of the building, which originally served as a warehouse for Christman's, is slightly narrower than the southern section. The history of the use of the annex parallels that of the main Christman Building and has been largely restored.

== Paramount Building ==
Originally built as the lobby and retail frontage for the Electric Theater in 1912, the Paramount Building at 507-513 South Main Street is a two-story commercial block that has brown brick walls, a concrete foundation and a flat roof. In 1966 and 1967 flat metal sheathing was applied to the front facing upper story to give it a more modern look, but this has since been removed and the front of the structure has been restored to a more original appearance. Originally a large theater auditorium that could seat more than 1,500 was attached to the back of the existing building, but it was demolished in November and December 1965 and the theater lobby was reassigned as a retail space. Prior to the introduction of sound films in the late 1920s, the theater showed silent films and hosted vaudeville acts. In 1930 the theater changed its name from the Electric Theater to the Paramount and ended all silent films and vaudeville acts. In 1926 Wurlitzer Opus organ #1443 was installed in what was then the Electric Theater, but it was later removed and sold.
