= Fox Theater (Joplin, Missouri) =

- U.S. National Register of Historic Places
- U.S. Historic district – Contributing property
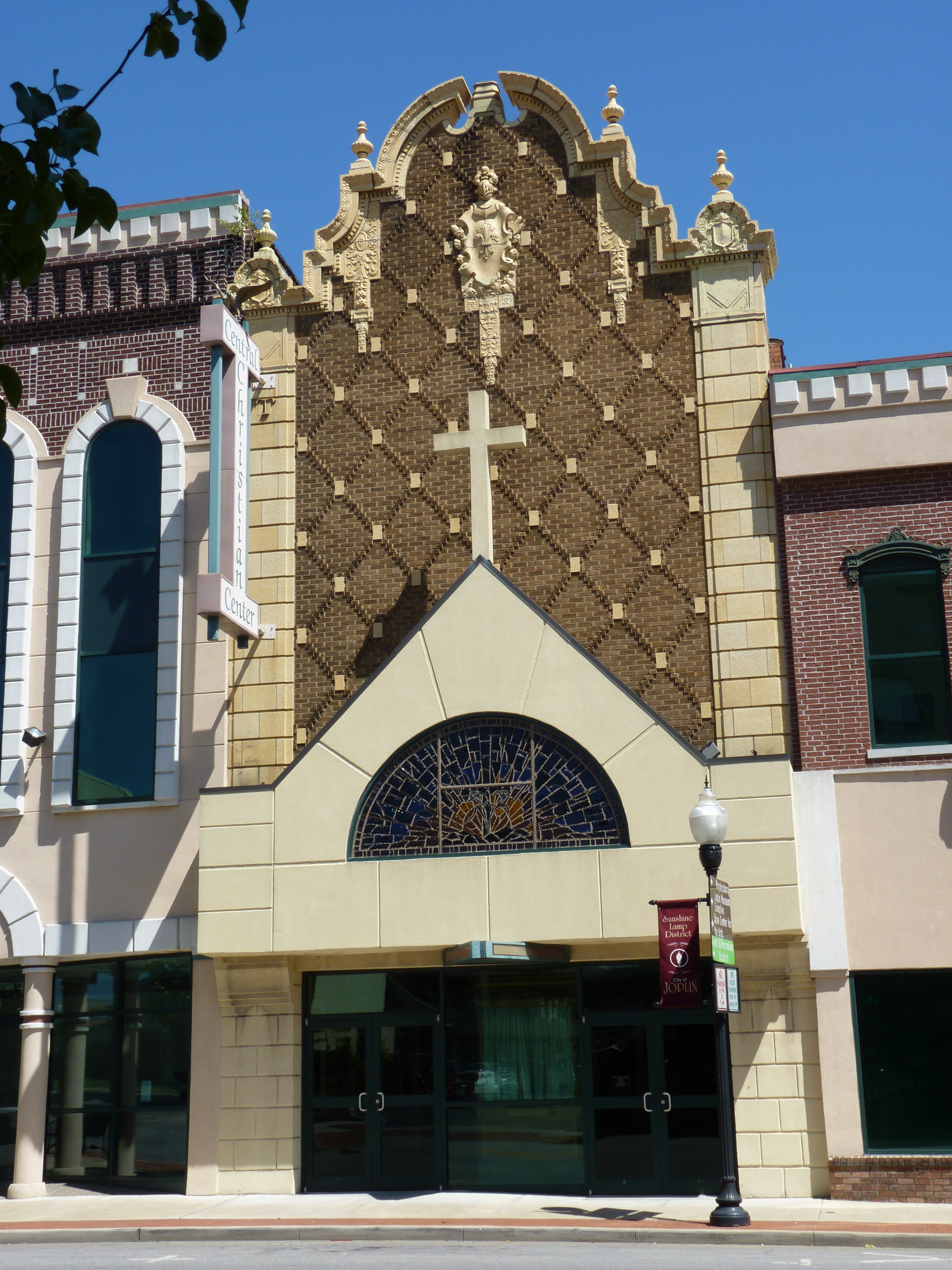
- Fox Theater, August 2010

- Location within Missouri Location within the United States
- Location: 415 S. Main St., Joplin, Missouri
- Coordinates: 37°5′18″N 94°30′51″W
- Area: less than one acre
- Built: 1930
- Built by: Gillioz, M.F., Construction Co.
- Architect: Larsen, L.P.
- Architectural style: Mission/spanish Revival
- NRHP reference No.: 90001100
- Added to NRHP: July 30, 1990

Fox Theater, also known as Central Christian Center, is a historic movie theater located at Joplin, Jasper County, Missouri. It was built in 1930, and is a two-story, L-shaped, brick, single bay, two-part commercial building with Mission Revival detailing. The ornate interior features extensive displays of plaster, metal, and wood decoration executed in Spanish Revival designs. The building was sold to the Central Assembly Church of Joplin in 1974.

It was listed on the National Register of Historic Places in 1990. It is located in the Joplin Downtown Historic District.
