= Ridgway Apartments =

- U.S. National Register of Historic Places
- U.S. Historic district – Contributing property
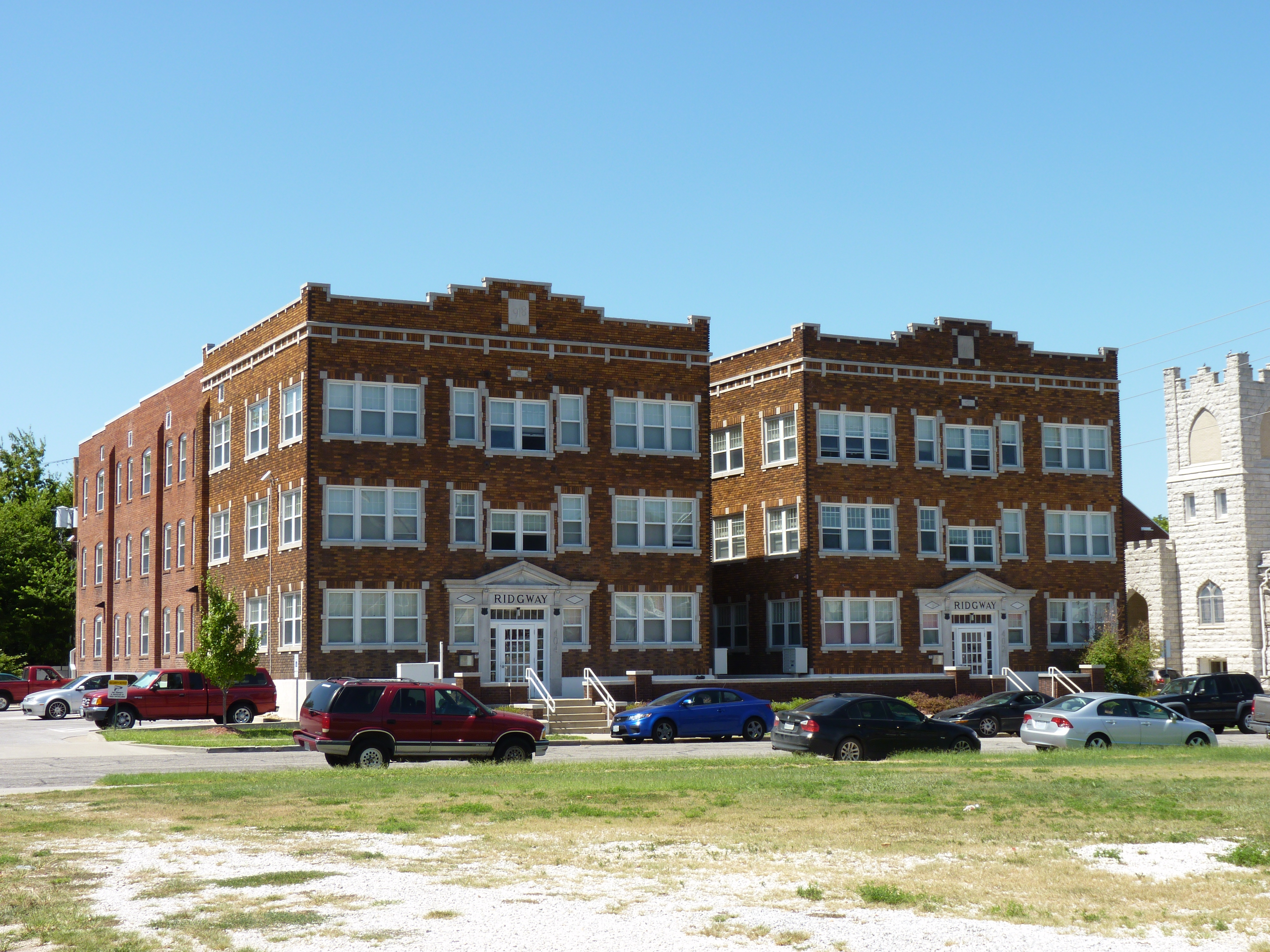

- Location within Missouri Location within the United States
- Location: 402 S. Byers Ave. and 404 S. Byers Ave., Joplin, Missouri
- Coordinates: 37°5′22″N 94°31′5″W
- Area: less than one acre
- Built: 1918
- Built by: Camp, R.P.
- Architect: Heckenlively, J.L.
- Architectural style: Early Commercial
- NRHP reference No.: 06000682
- Added to NRHP: August 8, 2006

Ridgway Apartments, also known as North Ridgeway Apartments & South Ridgeway Apartments, are two historic apartment buildings located at Joplin, Jasper County, Missouri. They were built in 1918, and are three-story, rectangular brick buildings. Each measures approximately 42 feet by 125 feet and feature centrally placed entrances embellished with a prominent pediment surround and stepped parapets that crown the main facade.

It was listed on the National Register of Historic Places in 2006. It is located in the Murphysburg Historic District.
