= Joplin and Wall Avenues Historic District =

Historic district in Missouri, United States

- U.S. National Register of Historic Places
- U.S. Historic district
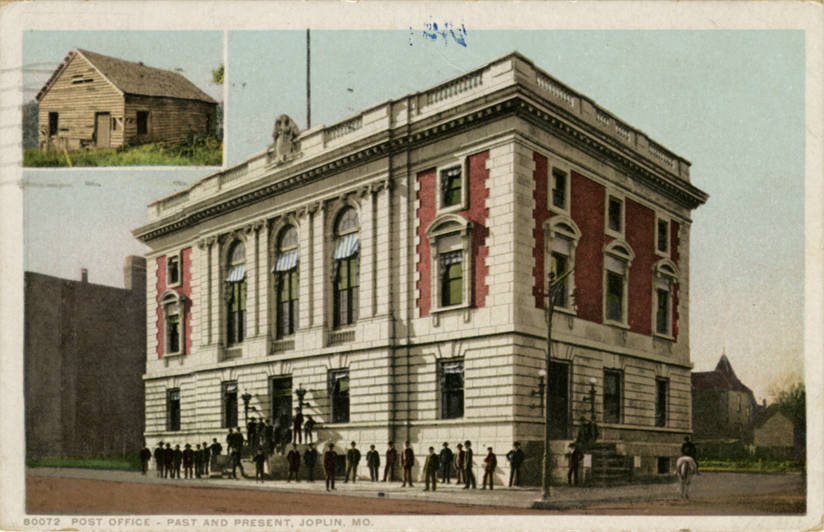
- Postcard of U.S. Post Office and Courthouse

- Location within Missouri Location within the United States
- Location: Portions of S. Joplin and Wall Aves., W. First, Second, Third Sts., Joplin, Missouri
- Coordinates: 37°05′23″N 94°30′53″W
- Area: 5 acres (2.0 ha)
- Built: c. 1900
- Built by: Dieter, C. A.
- Architect: Taylor, James Knox
- Architectural style: Renaissance Revival, Late Gothic Revival
- MPS: Historic Resources of Joplin, Missouri
- NRHP reference No.: 10000819
- Added to NRHP: October 12, 2010

Joplin and Wall Avenues Historic District is a national historic district located at Joplin, Jasper County, Missouri. The district encompasses 11 contributing buildings in the central business district of Joplin. It developed between about 1900 and 1939 and includes representative examples of Renaissance Revival and Late Gothic Revival style architecture. Located in the district is the previously listed Joplin Supply Company. Other notable buildings include the U.S. Post Office and Courthouse (1904), Cosgrove Building (1913), Independent Building (c. 1910), Hurlbut Chapel (c. 1920), and Crown/Greyhound Bus depot (1936).

It was listed on the National Register of Historic Places in 2010.
