= Phelps Farms Historic District =

Historic district in Connecticut, United States

- U.S. National Register of Historic Places
- U.S. Historic district
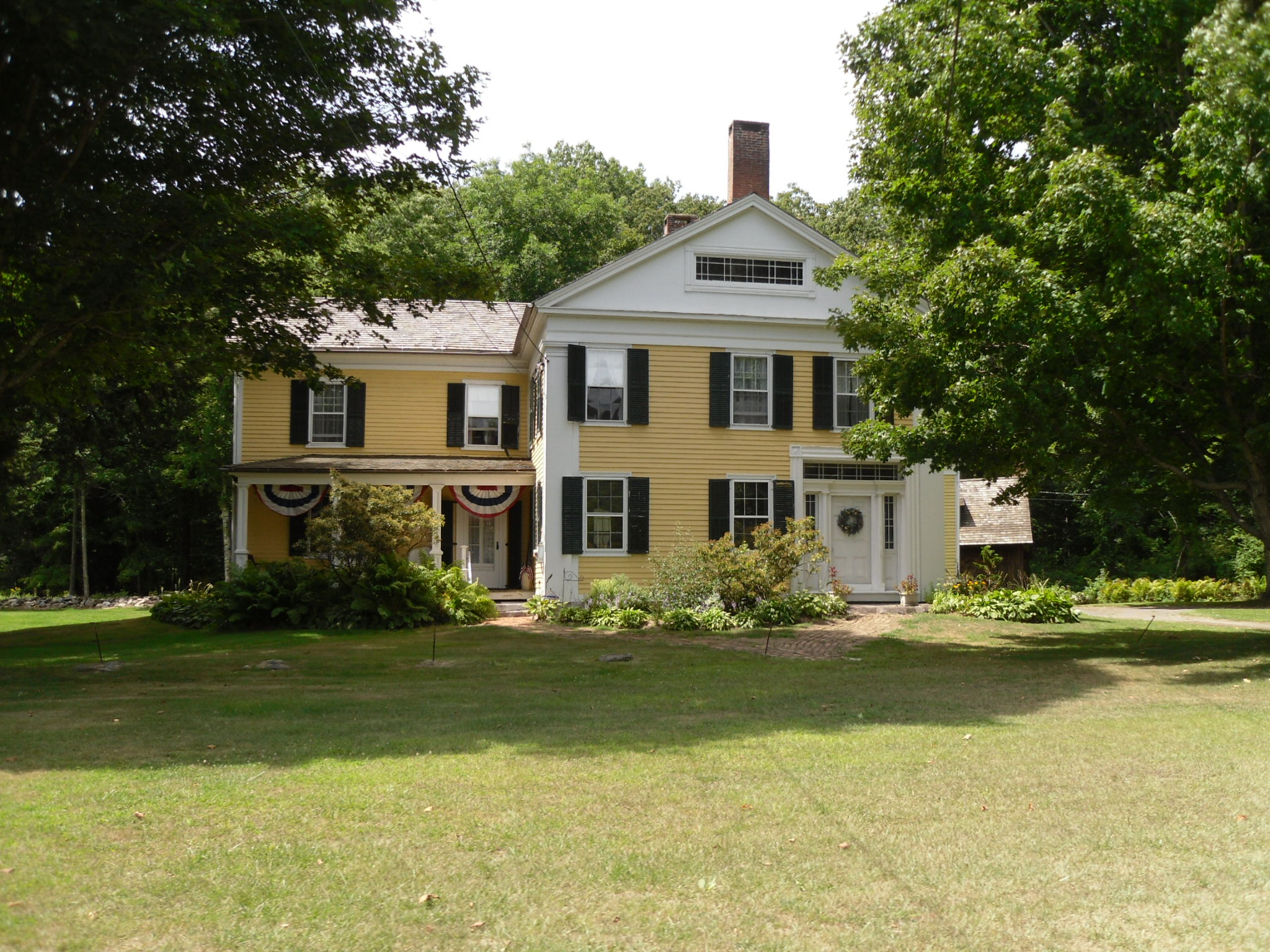

- Location within Connecticut Location within the United States
- Location: CT 183 and Prock Hill Road, Colebrook, Connecticut
- Coordinates: 42.016°N 73.1149°W
- Area: 35 acres (14 ha)
- Built: 1832
- Built by: Phelps, Arah; Phelps, Edward A.
- Architectural style: Greek Revival, Gothic Revival
- NRHP reference No.: 83001249
- Added to NRHP: August 18, 1983

The Phelps Farm Historic District encompasses a collection of farm and residential properties on Connecticut Route 183 and Prock Hill Road in Colebrook, Connecticut. This area is a virtually intact mid-19th century farmstead, with its land under a single family's ownership since the 18th century. The district was listed on the National Register of Historic Places in 1983.

== Description and history ==
The Phelps Farm property consists of about 35 acres (14 ha) of land in northern Colebrook, a Litchfield County hill town on the state's northern border. The property is bounded on the west and south by Sandy Brook, and extends onto the east side of CT 183 and Prock Hill Road, where some of the district buildings are located. Most notable of these is the Arah Phelps Inn, at the junction of the two roads, a fine Federal period house that was also operated by the family as a tavern. On the west side is the Greek Revival house of Edward Phelps, along with a number of 19th century outbuildings. Most of the farm is open pastureland.

The farm's history really begins in the 1780s, when Arah Phelps dammed Sandy Brook and built a sawmill. He and his father Josiah built the inn in 1793, and it soon became the center of a small community. The inn was an economic success as the road (now CT 183) was part of the stagecoach route between Hartford, Connecticut and Albany, New York. In addition to operating the tavern and mill, Arah also sold his own farm products at the inn. His son Edward took over the property in the 1830s, and it is during his ownership that many of the surviving farm buildings were constructed. In addition to the new family house, he also built a fine Gothic Revival cottage as housing for farm hands. The family fortunes waned in the early 20th century, but Phelps family members continued to retain ownership of most of the nearly 500 acres (200 ha). More than 300 acres (120 ha) of surrounding land have been given to the Nature Conservancy, and the farmstead is under a preservation covenant with Historic New England.

== See also ==
- National Register of Historic Places listings in Litchfield County, Connecticut
