= Durward G. Hall Federal Building and United States Courthouse =

Historic building in Missouri, United States

- U.S. Post Office and Courthouse
- U.S. Historic district – Contributing property
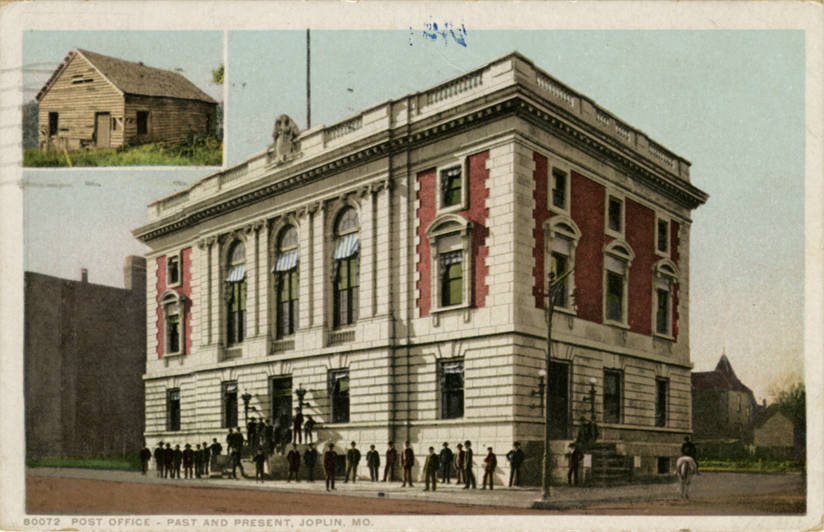
- Postcard prior to 1936 addition

- Location within Missouri Location within the United States
- Location: 302 South Joplin Avenue; Joplin, Missouri 64801
- Coordinates: 37°05′18″N 94°30′53″W
- Built: 1904
- Architect: James Knox Taylor
- Architectural style: Renaissance Revival
- Part of: Joplin and Wall Avenues Historic District (ID10000819)
- MPS: Historic Resources of Joplin, Missouri

The Durward G. Hall Federal Building and United States Courthouse is an historic building located in Joplin, Missouri. Completed in 1904 and added to in 1936, the courthouse was constructed during a time of initial growth for the City of Joplin, following several years of civic effort to obtain a Federal Post Office and Courthouse. Originally constructed to house a U.S. Post Office, Federal Court Room and offices for various public agencies, today it stands as a well-preserved example of the neo-classical revival style popular in Federal buildings of the period. The building served as a courthouse of the United States District Court for the Western District of Missouri from 1904 to 1999. It is named for U.S. Representative Durward Gorham Hall.

== History ==
Since the early 1890s, the City of Joplin, Missouri had been petitioning for a Federal government building in Joplin. The new Federal building, designed by the Department of the Treasury at Third and Joplin Streets, started construction in 1903. It was overseen by government supervisor H.G. Ritchey, and opened for business December 19, 1904. Plans and specifications for the building were prepared and dated December 19, 1902. It was completed for a total cost of $150,000. In the opening announcement article in The Joplin Globe, December 18, 1904, the city's pride in the new facility is evident: "It's a long story, the history of the government building in Joplin, a story of hope deferred and patience tried, but as the public files into the post office tomorrow morning it may be confidently predicted that it was worth waiting for".

Due to the continued growth of Joplin and especially the demands on the Post Office, in 1922 and 1923, requests for an addition to the original structure was made to the Supervising Architect, Treasury Department in Washington, D.C. In 1935 as part of the Works Progress Administration, construction of two additional wings was started, and a grand opening was held on October 8, 1936. Senator Harry S. Truman spoke at the opening ceremonies. In 2010, the National Register of Historic Places established the Joplin and Wall Avenues Historic District with the building as a contributing property.

== Architectural description ==
The original Joplin Federal Building and Courthouse was completed in 1904. It contained the post office on the first floor and part of the basement, the Federal courtroom and associated offices on the second floor and Federal Marshal's and other offices on the third floor. The basement also contained the mechanical equipment for the coal fired steam heating system. The Joplin Globe article of December 18, 1904, describes the public area of the ground floor:

The entrance, a revolving gate opens into the main rotunda which runs pretty nearly the entire length of the building. The post office screen, which is the architectural term for what might be called the counter at which postal shipping is conducted, is a veritable rampart of marble, bronze, and antique oak. Elegance and solidity are the commanding features of the new post office. The floor of the rotunda or court is concrete (terrazzo) and marble. Iron and bronze have been used in artistic proportion in the interior.

The uses remained fairly constant until the post office moved to a new facility in 1962. At that time, the General Services Administration acquired the building and converted the first floor to office space, obscuring some of the original detailing. The fire and life safety systems have been upgraded and facilities for the disabled have been provided. In 1964, the third floor was air-conditioned and a few years later the rest of the building was air-conditioned, utilizing lay-in ceilings, which obscured much of the original detailing. In 1978, the original wood windows were replaced with fixed glass and aluminum frames. In 1992 and 1993, the air-conditioning and heating systems were replaced. The main lobby was retained as the building entry lobby with some of the original detailing remaining at the ceiling and exterior walls.

=== Site ===
The Federal Building and Courthouse is located in the Central Business District of Joplin on the corner of Third and Joplin Streets. It is surrounded by two and three story, turn of the century, commercial buildings on the west, north, and south. The new city library is directly across Joplin Street to the east. The only on-site parking is a small surface lot to the south. The primary facades of the building face the east toward Joplin Street and north toward Third Street. The main entry is centered on the Joplin Street facade.

The 1936 addition filled the site to the original west property line. The original site plan indicated concrete curbs at the north and east sides of the building, which remain today. The north entry has been moved one bay to the west and the formal steps at the main east entry have been replaced with a disabled access ramp and new stair. Window wells, to provide daylight into basement spaces, are covered with original decorative wrought iron bars. There are small landscaped yards at the north and part of the east sides.

=== Building ===
The Federal Building and Courthouse was designed in the era of centralized Federal government buildings that preceded the Great Depression, and during the secondary growth and development of the West. The building program was the result of rapid growth following the development of natural resources, with the influx of population resulting in the formation of cities, all of which demanded services as well as law and order. Federal design policies of standardization that were implemented as attempts to meet this demand were executed. Building designs were generated from the Department of the Treasury and its supervising architect.

The Federal Building in Joplin is 36,228 square feet in size, including the 1936 addition. The exterior design of the building combines Federal and Renaissance Revival styles typical of the Department of the Treasury designs of the period. Drawings for the Joplin Post Office were signed by James Knox Taylor, Supervising Architect in 1902.

Rectangular in plan, the original building measured 98'-8" across the primary facade, 53'-4" deep, and stood 56'-0" tall. The 1936 addition to the west side of the building extended the basement and ground floor an additional 55'-0". This addition continued the full height of the building on the north and south facades with two wings 29'-10" wide, resulting in a two level light court 37'-8" wide and 55'-0" deep. Today's building is almost square at the basement and first levels, and U-shaped at the second, third and roof levels.

The two primary facades of the building are faced in Carthage limestone, with a smooth faced modular red brick on the upper levels. The secondary facades have limestone accent detailing with the same red brick between. The brick mortar is white with a tooled joint accenting the red brick. The 1936 addition was blended into the original construction at the north facade, resulting in an integrated appearance. The juncture at the south elevation between the original building and the 1986 addition was less well integrated, changing from brick to limestone at the joint.

The primary facade is divided into five bays, with two end bays, 19'-8" wide, recessed back 1'-0" from the three center bays. These end bays are accented with limestone quoins at the sides, and decorative limestone detailing at the second-level windows. The center three bays are accented with limestone detailing for the full height, and three two-story arch-top windows opening into the two level courtroom on the second level. At the first level, the center bay contains the main building entrance, flanked by identical bays originally containing double hung windows. The arch-top windows are flanked at the second and third levels with Ionic capital flat limestone pilasters, with a stone balustrade at the second level. The facade is capped with a limestone dentil cornice, which is topped with a limestone balustrade. Originally, the windows were wood frame and sash without division. The three central arch-top windows originally were divided vertically into three sections, with these mulls extending through the arch. A 1978 renovation replaced all the wood windows with fixed aluminum windows. The arch-top central windows now have closed arch-tops and are divided into two sections rather than the original three. The original limestone entry stair has been replaced with a brick access ramp and stair combination. The original bronze framed rotating entry door has been changed to an aluminum storefront system. The window pattern continues around the other three building elevations and inside the rear, second and third level light court.

The full height wings and the single story portion at the back of the building, added during the 1936 extension, originally served as the Post Office Workroom. The north wing, added during the same 1936 program, carry the original limestone and brick detailing back to within 7'-3" of the west corner. At that point, the original brick continues to the corner and across the west and south facade, but the limestone detailing ceases. The original building, prior to the 1936 extension, carried the limestone detailing around all four sides of the building. In the central light court a large, linear skylight added in 1936, which was used to help illuminate the Post Office Workroom, has been removed.

==== Structure ====
The original building structure is structural steel columns encased in masonry, with a structural steel floor frame, infilled with wood floor system joists and decking, and exterior brick masonry walls. The ceiling above the attic is wood framed; and the roof is framed with steel trusses, wood purlins, and decked with wood. The 1936 addition structure is structural steel columns encased in concrete; and the first, second and third floors are one-way (ribbed) reinforced concrete over structural steel floor framing. The roof is steel frame with mesh reinforced concrete deck.

==== Interior ====
Although the U.S. Postal Service no longer utilizes the building, the original post office lobby is mostly intact and well maintained. The original terrazzo and marble floor has been covered with vinyl asbestos tile (VAT), and the original marble base has had rubber base applied to it. The varnished oak detailing at the exterior walls and windows is well maintained and mostly intact. The plaster detailing in the ceiling is mostly intact although non-period light fixtures have been installed. The original highly detailed postal screen has been removed and a drywall partition has been installed in its place. The southern bay of the lobby has been walled off to create a new office space. The decorative varnished oak leading into the old Post Master's office is mostly intact and well maintained. The rest of the floor is divided by drywall partitions. Ceilings are 2x4 lay-in acoustical tile, concealing air-conditioning ducts and original plaster ceilings. The floors are all vinyl asbestos tile (VAT).

Originally, an open decorative wrought iron, marble, and oak stairwell, extended from the lobby through the third floors enfolding a north entry vestibule under the landing. Today, the entry has been moved west and this stair has been enclosed with walls and doors and enfolds an elevator in its center. In several places the stair and railing have been cut. The original decorative, rotating entry door has been removed and a varnished oak airlock with aluminum doors has been installed. The original secondary exit at the north wall has been turned into a window to make room for the elevator, and an aluminum door installed at the next window location to the west.

At the second floor stair/elevator lobby, the original, leather covered, brass nailed courtroom door, remains concealed behind a steel fire door. The terrazzo and marble floors have been covered with vinyl asbestos tile (VAT). Inside the courtroom, the original varnished oak paneled walls, bar and benches, are all intact. The ceiling has had a lay-in ceiling installed, although the tile has been removed exposing the original decorative plaster detailing. The lay-in ceiling grid cuts across the three main facade arch-top windows. The original light fixtures are still in place above the lay-in ceiling grid.

The rest of the second floor and the third floor are divided into offices, mostly as they were constructed in 1936. The corridors and most of the offices are lined with varnished and painted oak wainscoting and door and window trim. The oak trim has been cut off at the transom level to install lay-in ceilings, which conceals air-conditioning ductwork. The oak floors have been covered with plywood and vinyl asbestos tile (VAT).

The basement finishes are similar to the other floors, except that the finish under the vinyl flooring is concrete, and lay-in ceilings have not been installed. Some of the original oak doors, frames, and transoms are intact, but have been painted white. Between the old Postal Swing Room and the toilet facilities, the observation areaway and viewports are still intact. At all levels the toilets mostly are still intact in the form in which they were revised during the 1936 remodel. The toilet partitions and wainscoting are marble. The period ceramic fixtures have nickel fixtures and fittings.

The mechanical systems have been totally renovated and replaced in recent years, with the steam radiators removed from the building.
