= Joplin Supply Company =

- U.S. National Register of Historic Places
- U.S. Historic district – Contributing property
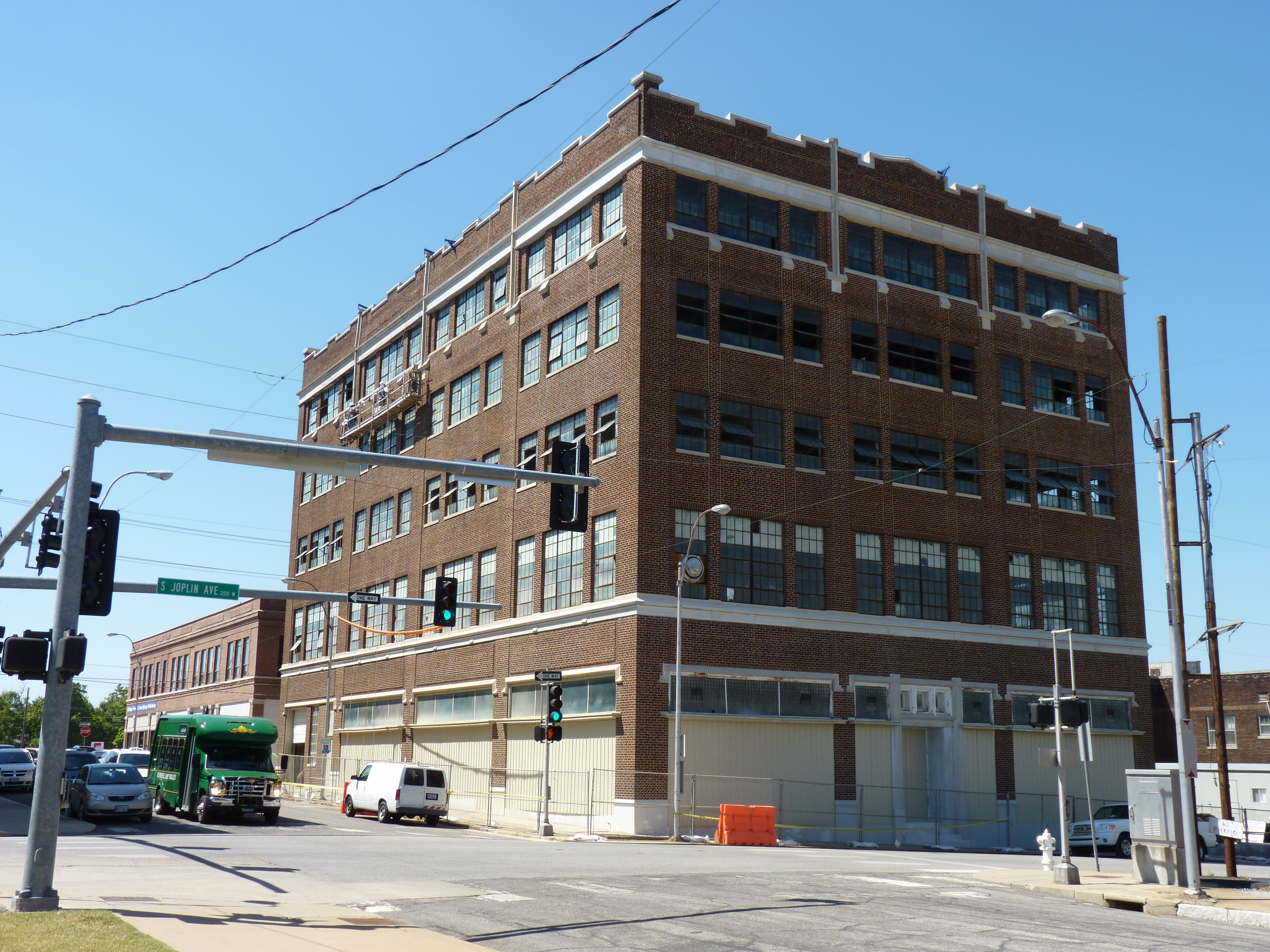

- Location within Missouri Location within the United States
- Location: 228 S. Joplin Ave., Joplin, Missouri
- Coordinates: 37°5′20″N 94°30′52″W
- Area: less than one acre
- Built: 1922
- Built by: Dieter, C.A.
- Architectural style: Two-Park Vertical Block
- NRHP reference No.: 07000652
- Added to NRHP: July 3, 2007

Joplin Supply Company is a historic commercial building located at Joplin, Jasper County, Missouri. It was built in 1922, and is a five-story, two-part vertical block commercial building. It is a steel reinforced concrete structure with brick cladding and large multi-pane windows and simple stone detailing.

It was listed on the National Register of Historic Places in 2007. It is located in the Joplin and Wall Avenues Historic District.
