= Joplin Furniture Company Building =

- U.S. National Register of Historic Places
- Location within Missouri Location within the United States
- Location: 702-708 Main St., Joplin, Missouri
- Coordinates: 37°05′02″N 94°30′49″W
- Area: Less than 1 acre (0.40 ha)
- Built: c. 1899, 1906, 1908, 1923
- Architect: Michaelis, August C.
- Architectural style: Three-part vertical block, Classical Revival
- MPS: Historic Resources of Joplin, Missouri MPDF
- NRHP reference No.: 12000473
- Added to NRHP: July 17, 2012

Joplin Furniture Company Building is a historic commercial building located at Joplin, Jasper County, Missouri. The two original buildings were constructed in 1899 and 1906, and subsequently expanded and combined in 1908 and 1923. The resulting building is a four-story bearing wall brick masonry building in the Classical Revival style. The Joplin Furniture Company operated continuously at this location from 1908 to 1982.

It was listed on the National Register of Historic Places in 2012.
