= Arah Phelps Inn =

Historic house in Connecticut, United States

- U.S. National Register of Historic Places
- U.S. Historic district – Contributing property
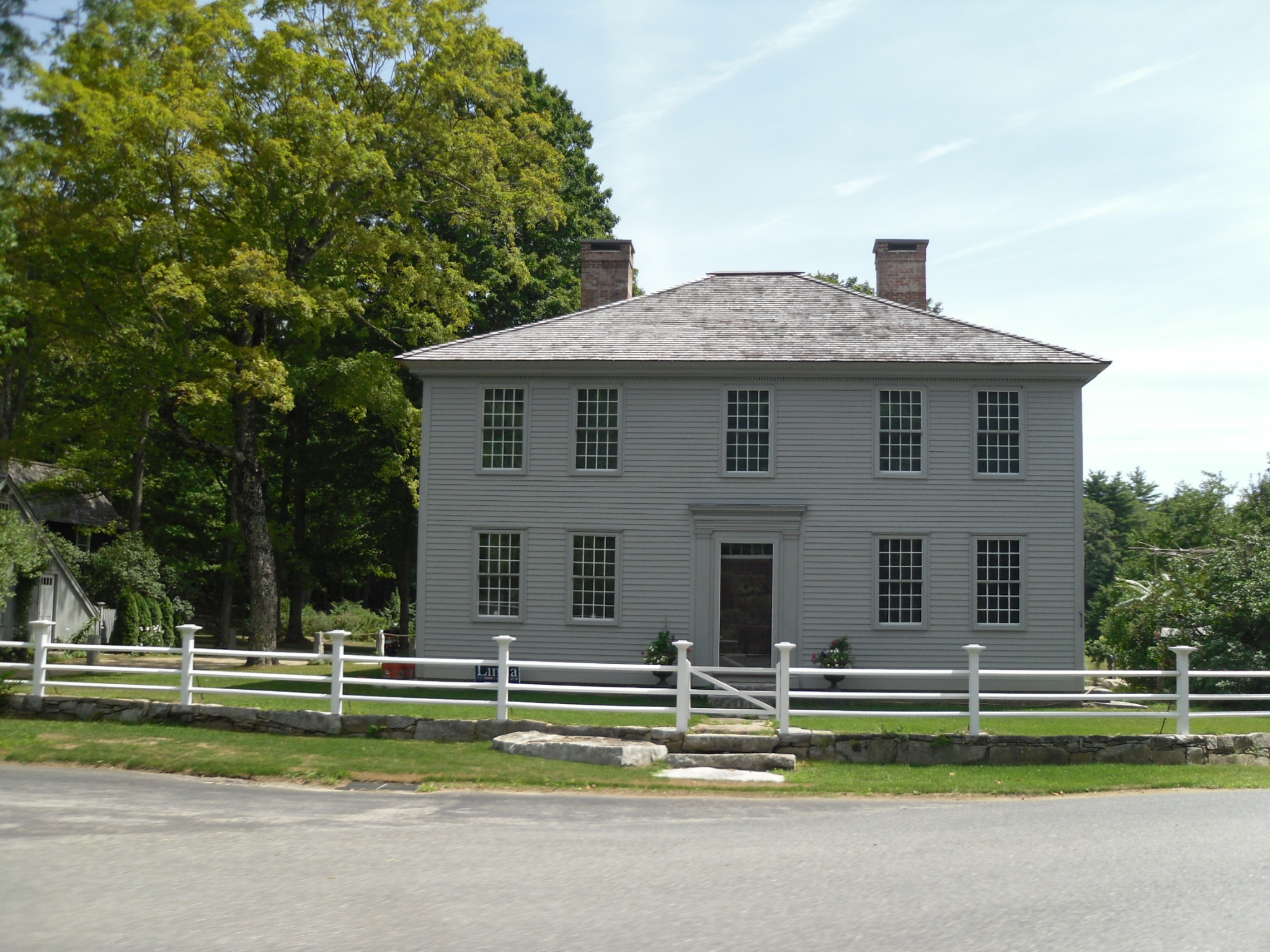

- Location within Connecticut Location within the United States
- Location: Junction of Prock Hill Road and CT 183, Colebrook, Connecticut
- Coordinates: 42°1′3″N 73°6′54″W
- Area: 2 acres (0.81 ha)
- Built: 1787
- Part of: Phelps Farms Historic District (ID83001249)
- NRHP reference No.: 71000905

Significant dates
- Added to NRHP: August 5, 1971
- Designated CP: August 18, 1983

The Arah Phelps Inn is a historic house and traveler accommodation at Prock Hill Road and Connecticut Route 183 in Colebrook, Connecticut. Built in 1787, it is one Colebrook's oldest surviving buildings, and served as a fixture on the main Hartford-Albany stagecoach route for many years. It was listed on the National Register of Historic Places in 1971. It is now a private residence.

== Description and history ==
The Arah Phelps Inn stands in a rural area of northern Colebrook, at the east side of the junction of CT 183 with Prock Hill Road. It is part of a larger cluster of Phelps family farm buildings in the immediate area. It is a two-story wood-frame structure, with a hip roof, two interior chimneys, and a clapboarded exterior. It has a five-bay front facade, with a center entrance framed by pilasters, transom window, and corniced entablature. The interior follows an unusual center-hall plan, with the main stairs placed at the rear of the house, owing to the presence of a full-width ballroom space at the front of the second floor. Portions of the building were damaged by fire in 1942, but underwent a sensitive reconstruction with period materials.

The inn was built in 1787 by Arah Phelps and his father Josiah, Jr. The land on which it stands was originally granted to Josiah Phelps Sr. in 1720. Arah Phelps operated the inn for nearly fifty years, eventually turning it over (along with the surrounding farm property) to his son Edward. The inn and farmland continue to be owned by Phelps descendants.

== See also ==
- National Register of Historic Places listings in Litchfield County, Connecticut
