= Scottish Rite Cathedral (Joplin, Missouri) =

Historic place in Missouri, United States

- U.S. National Register of Historic Places
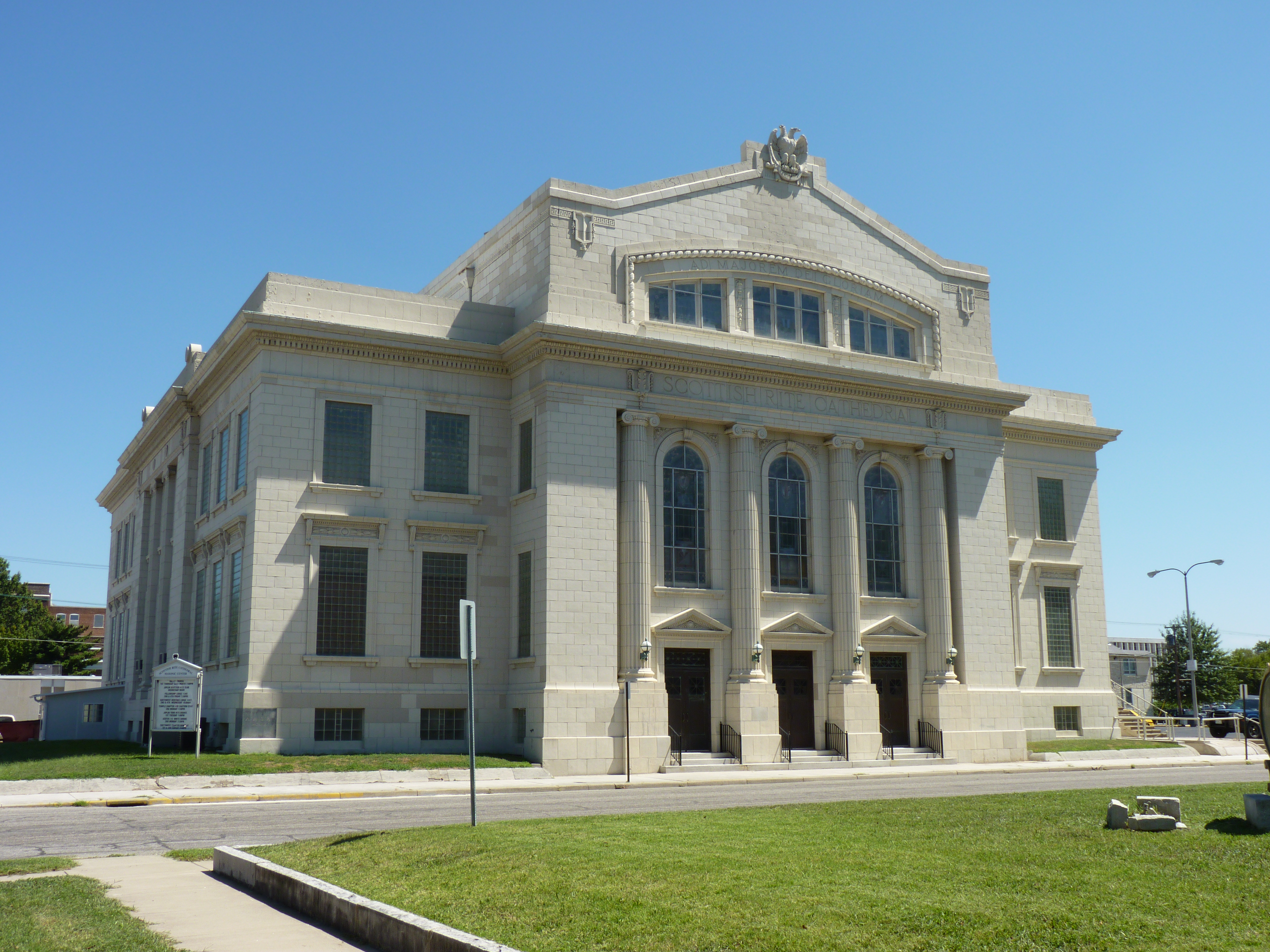

- Location within Missouri Location within the United States
- Location: 505 Byers Ave., Joplin, Missouri
- Coordinates: 37°5′11″N 94°31′2″W
- Built: 1923 CE
- Architect: Greene, Herbert M.; Bane, C.W.
- Architectural style: Beaux Arts
- NRHP reference No.: 90000989
- Added to NRHP: June 21, 1990 CE

The Scottish Rite Cathedral is a historic Masonic Temple located at Joplin, Jasper County, Missouri. It was built in 1923, and is a two-story, Beaux Arts style concrete and terra cotta social hall. It sits on a raised basement and features fluted Ionic order columns and pilasters.

It was listed on the National Register of Historic Places in 1990.
