= Murphysburg Historic District =

Historic district in Missouri, United States

- U.S. National Register of Historic Places
- U.S. Historic district
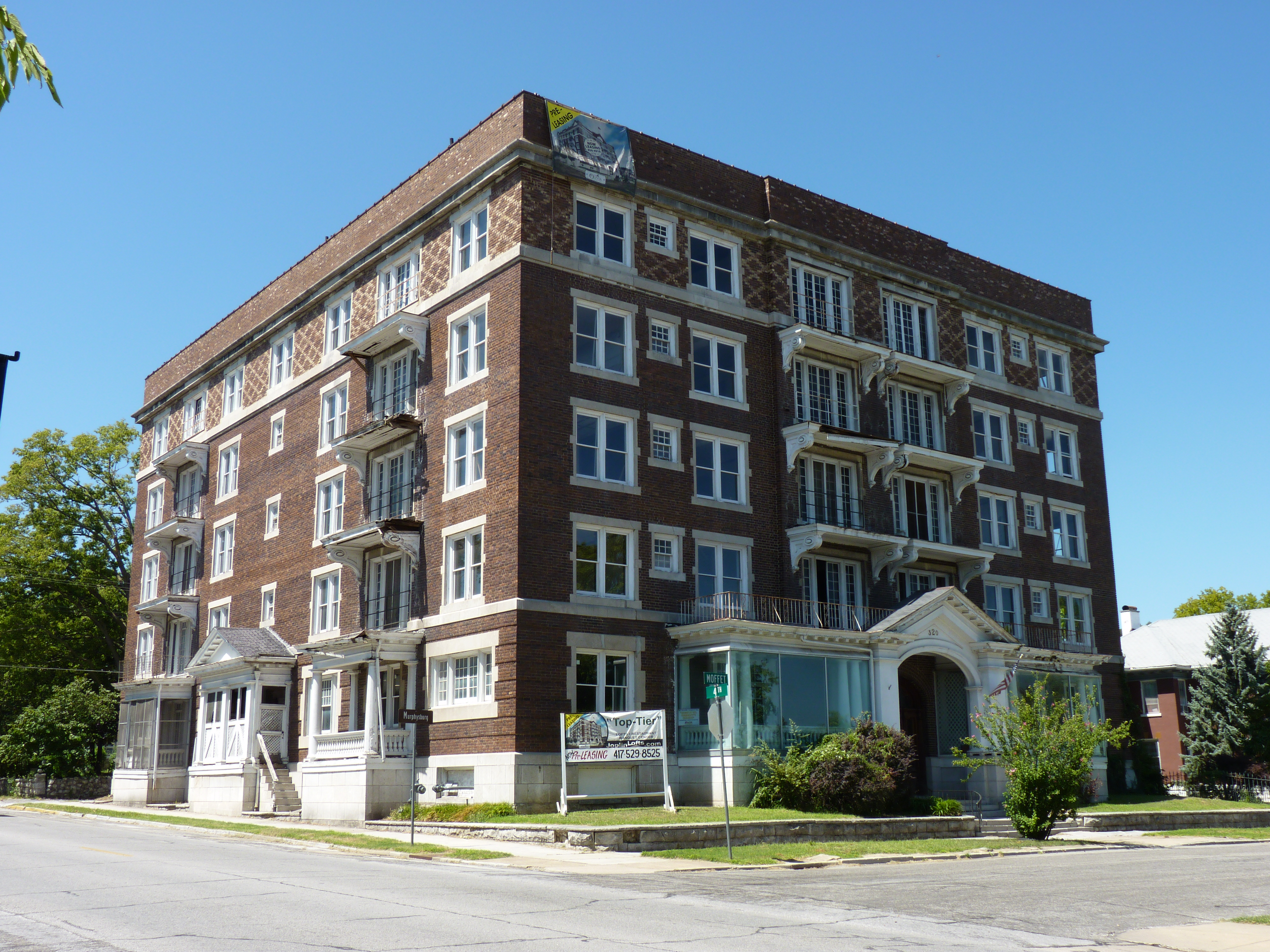
- The Olivia Apartments

- Location within Missouri Location within the United States
- Location: Roughly bounded by S. Sergeant, S. Pearl & S. Byers Aves., W. 1st, W. 4th & W. 7th Sts., Joplin, Missouri
- Coordinates: 37°05′08″N 94°31′05″W
- Area: 52.9 acres (21.4 ha)
- Built: c. 1880
- Built by: Dieter and Wetzel
- Architect: Garstang and Rea; Michaelis, August C.; Austin, Allen
- Architectural style: Queen Anne, Richardsonian Romanesque, Classical Revival, Mission Revival, Colonial Revival, Tudor Revival
- MPS: Historic Resources of Joplin, Missouri
- NRHP reference No.: 15000228
- Added to NRHP: May 18, 2015

Murphysburg Historic District is a national historic district located at Joplin, Jasper County, Missouri. The district encompasses 185 contributing buildings in a predominantly residential section of Joplin. It developed between about 1880 and 1965 and includes representative examples of Queen Anne, Richardsonian Romanesque, Classical Revival, Mission Revival, Colonial Revival, and Tudor Revival style architecture. Located in the district are the previously listed Olivia Apartments and Ridgway Apartments. Other notable buildings include the J.H. Brand House (1899), John Wise House (1898), A.B. McConnell House (c. 1899), H.H. McNeal House (1908), H. Edward Dangerfield House (1895), First Methodist Church (1905), and Second Church of Christ, Scientist (c. 1907).

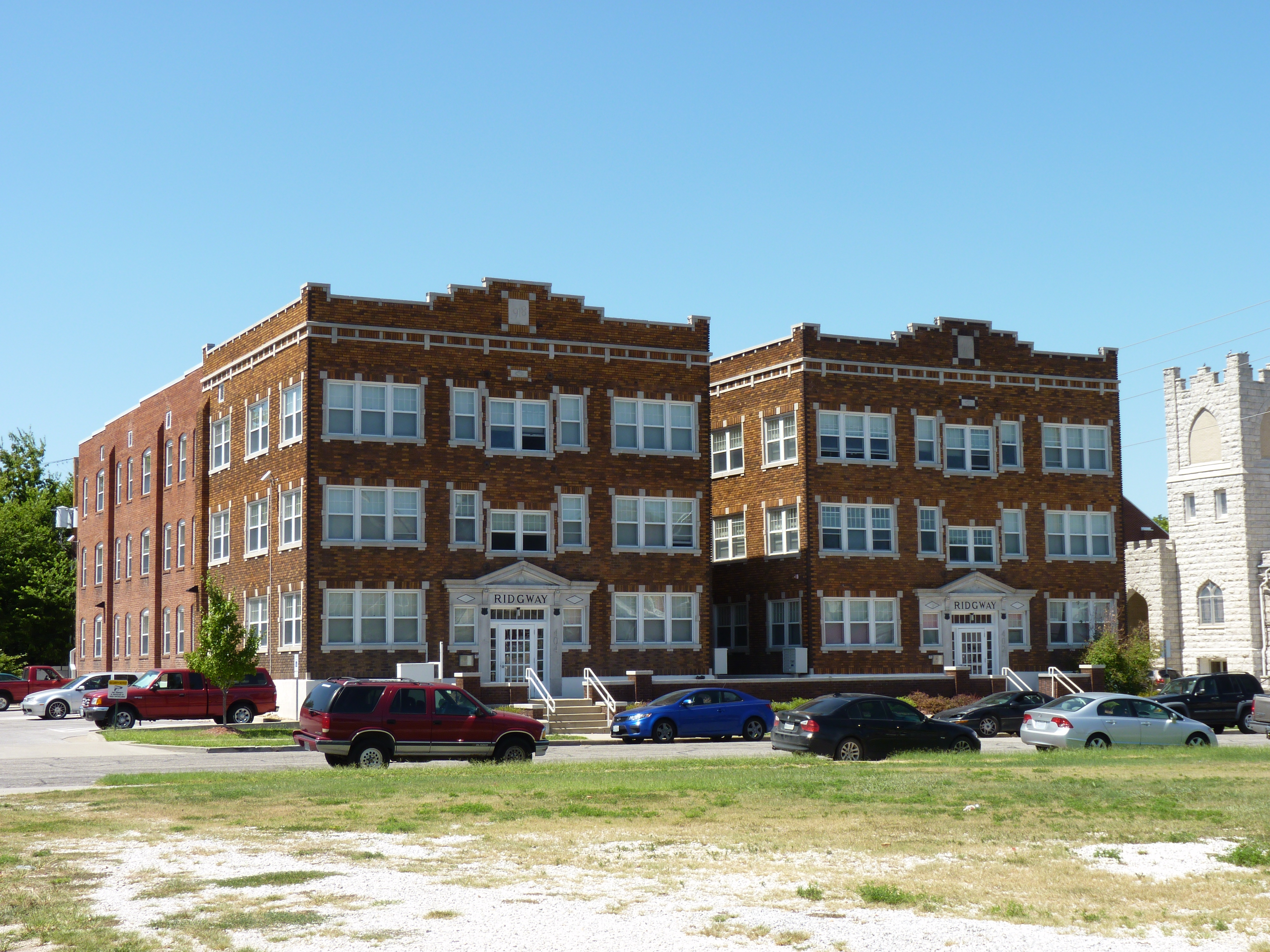
The Ridgway Apartments

It was listed on the National Register of Historic Places in 2015.
