= Main and Eighth Streets Historic District =

Historic district in Missouri, United States

- U.S. National Register of Historic Places
- U.S. Historic district
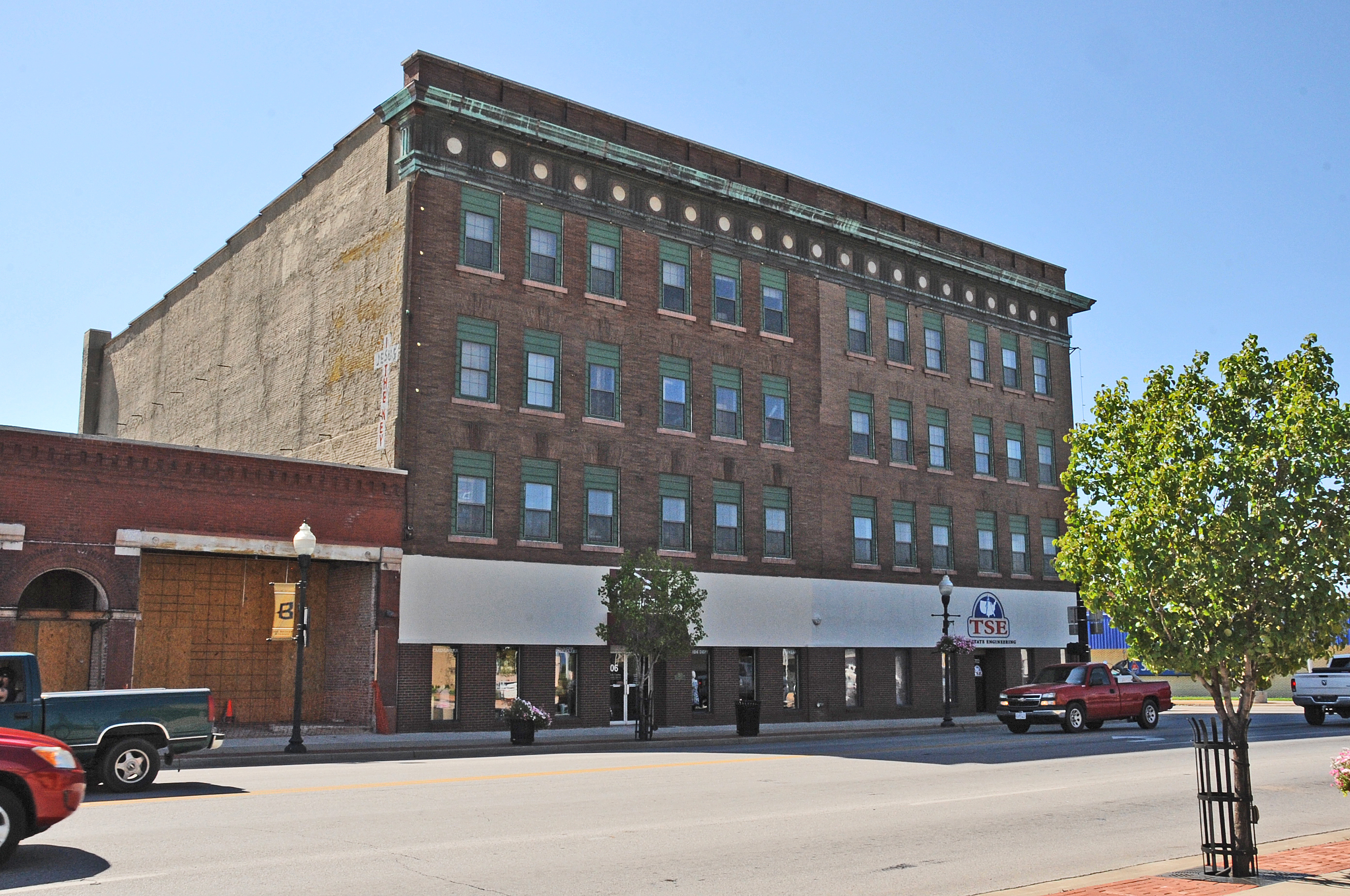
- Main and Eighth Streets Historic District, January 2009

- Location within Missouri Location within the United States
- Location: Portions of the 800 and 900 block of S. Main St., Joplin, Missouri
- Coordinates: 37°04′53″N 94°30′49″W
- Area: 6 acres (2.4 ha)
- Built: c. 1891; 135 years ago
- Built by: Dieter, C. A.
- Architect: Garstang and Rea; Michaelis, August C.
- Architectural style: Renaissance Revival, Colonial Revival
- MPS: Historic Resources of Joplin, Missouri
- NRHP reference No.: 11000185
- Added to NRHP: April 15, 2011

Main and Eighth Streets Historic District is a national historic district located at Joplin, Jasper County, Missouri. The district encompasses 20 contributing buildings in the central business district of Joplin. It developed between about 1891 and 1929 and includes representative examples of Renaissance Revival and Colonial Revival style architecture. Located in the district is the previously listed Rains Brothers Building. Other notable buildings include the Marquette Hotel (c. 1916), Willard Hotel (c. 1901), Muir Block (1891), Stevens Hotel / Scottish Rite Temple (1899), and Hotel Blende (1899).

It was listed on the National Register of Historic Places in 2011.
