= South Main Street Historic District (Joplin, Missouri) =

Historic district in Missouri, United States

- U.S. National Register of Historic Places
- U.S. Historic district
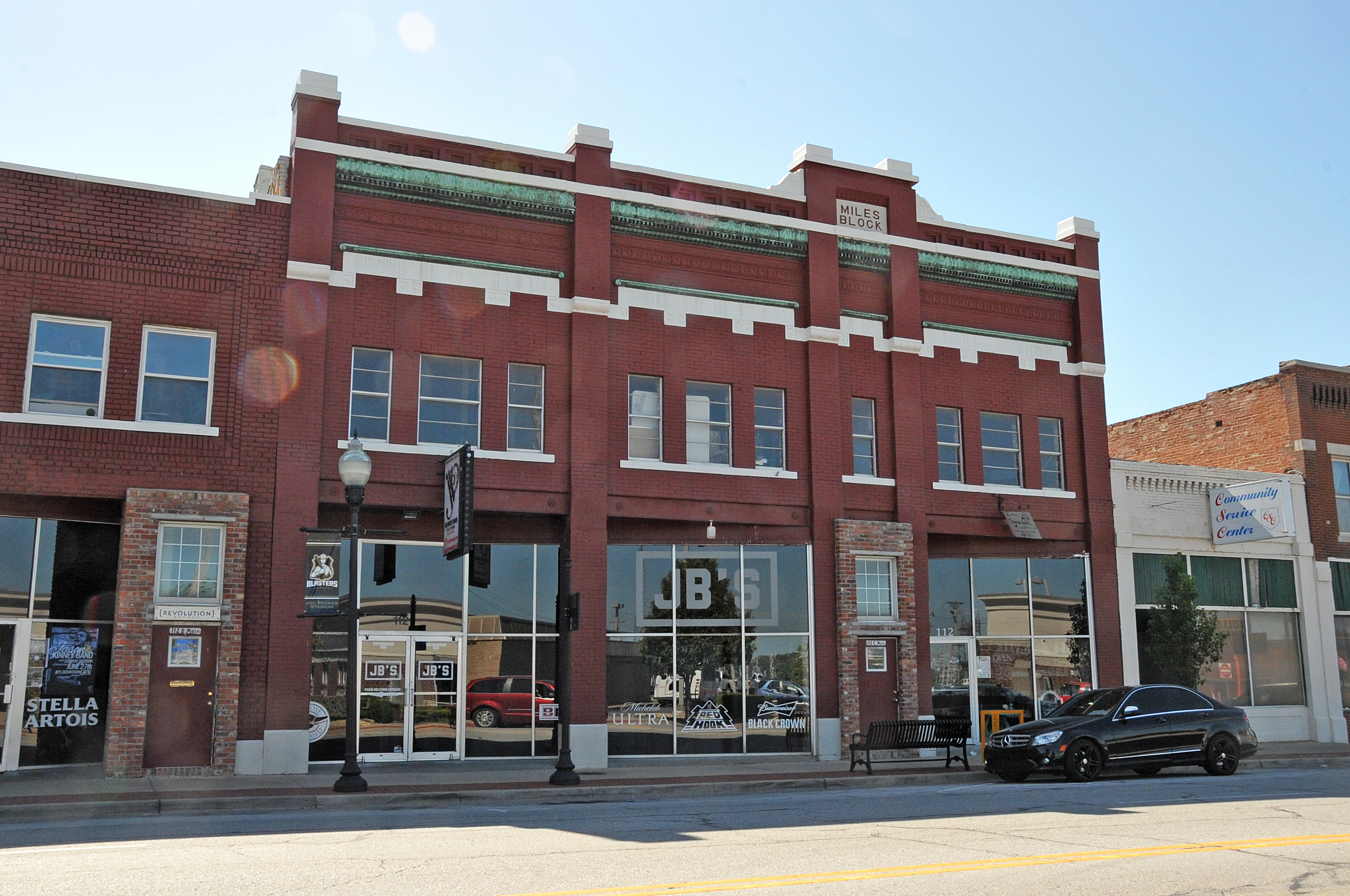
- Miles Block, January 2009

- Location within Missouri Location within the United States
- Location: Western side of S. Main St., between W. First and W. Second Sts., Joplin, Missouri
- Coordinates: 37°05′24″N 94°30′48″W
- Area: Less than 1 acre (0.40 ha)
- Built: c. 1901
- Architectural style: Italianate, Colonial Revival
- MPS: Historic Resources of Joplin, Missouri
- NRHP reference No.: 10000818
- Added to NRHP: October 12, 2010

South Main Street Historic District is a national historic district located at Joplin, Jasper County, Missouri. The district encompasses eight contributing buildings in a commercial section of Joplin. It developed between about 1901 and 1960 and includes representative examples of Italianate and Colonial Revival style architecture. Notable buildings include the Phillips Building (c. 1901), Miles Block (c. 1900), Bennett Building (c. 1909), and William E. Sanders Building (1909).

It was listed on the National Register of Historic Places in 2010.
