= Joplin Downtown Historic District =

Historic district in Missouri, United States

- U.S. National Register of Historic Places
- U.S. Historic district
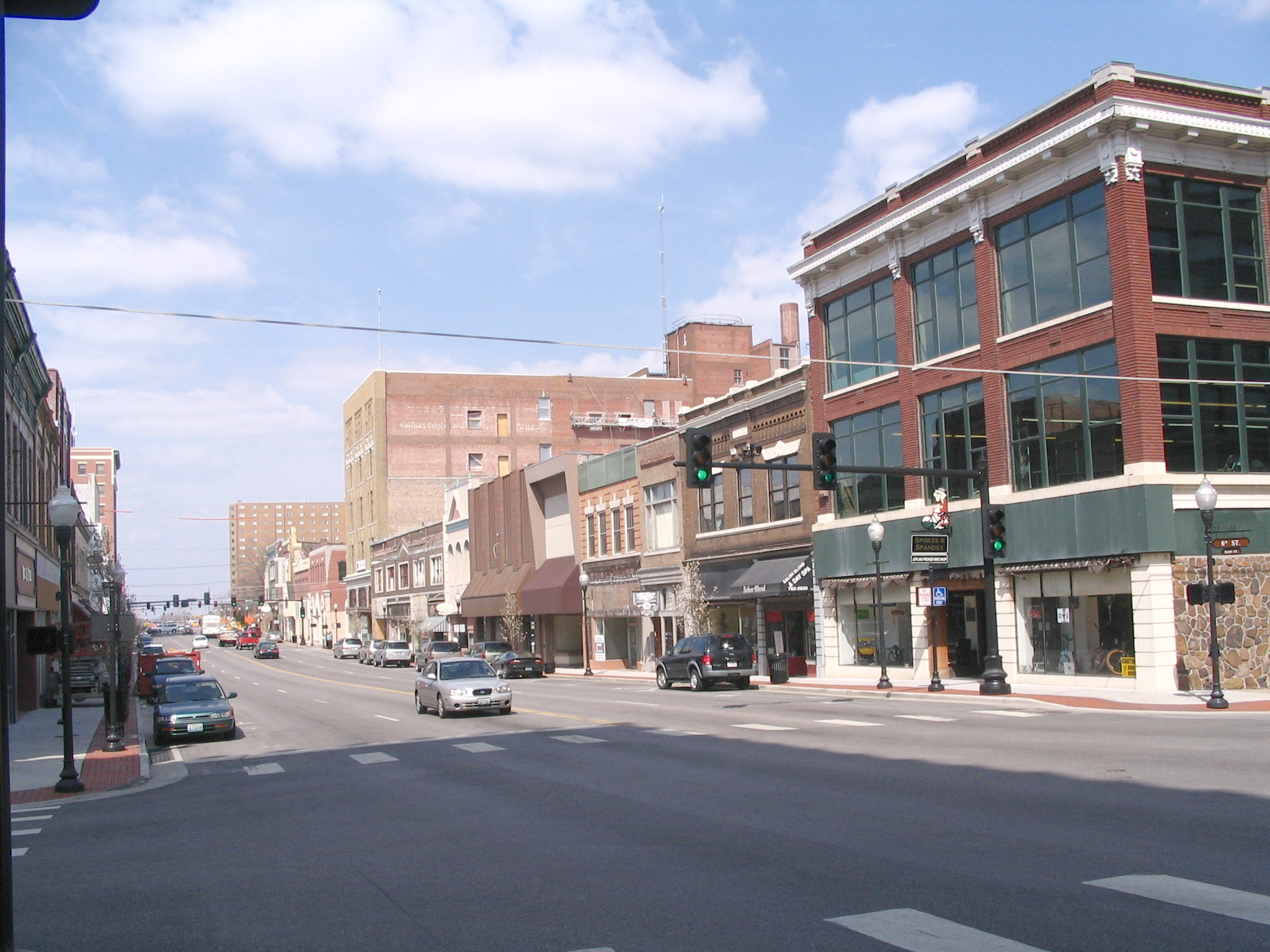

- Location within Missouri Location within the United States
- Interactive map showing the location of Joplin Downtown Historic District
- Location: S. Main St., roughly between E. 4th and E. 6th Sts., Joplin, Missouri
- Coordinates: 37°05′12″N 94°30′48″W
- Area: 12 acres (4.9 ha)
- Built: 1883
- Architect: Michaelis, August; Allen. Austin; et al.
- Architectural style: Late 19th And Early 20th Century American Movements, two-park commercial
- MPS: Historic Resources of Joplin, Missouri
- NRHP reference No.: 08000661
- Added to NRHP: July 16, 2008

Joplin Downtown Historic District is a national historic district located at Joplin, Jasper County, Missouri. The district encompasses 48 contributing buildings in the central business district of Joplin. It developed between about 1883 and 1958 and includes representative examples of Mission Revival, Art Deco, and Modern Movement style architecture. The district includes the previously listed Fifth and Main Historic District, Newman Brothers Building, Fox Theater, and St. Louis and San Francisco Railroad Building. Other notable buildings include the Liberty Building (1923), Cunningham Bank / Quinby Building (c. 1884, c. 1924), Model Clothing Store Building (c. 1899), Lichliter-Kassab Building (1893, 1940), Zelleken Block (c. 1890), Muenning Building (c. 1885), and Frank Hollcroft Livery Building (c. 1890).

It was listed on the National Register of Historic Places in 2008.
