= Olivia Apartments =

- U.S. National Register of Historic Places
- U.S. Historic district – Contributing property
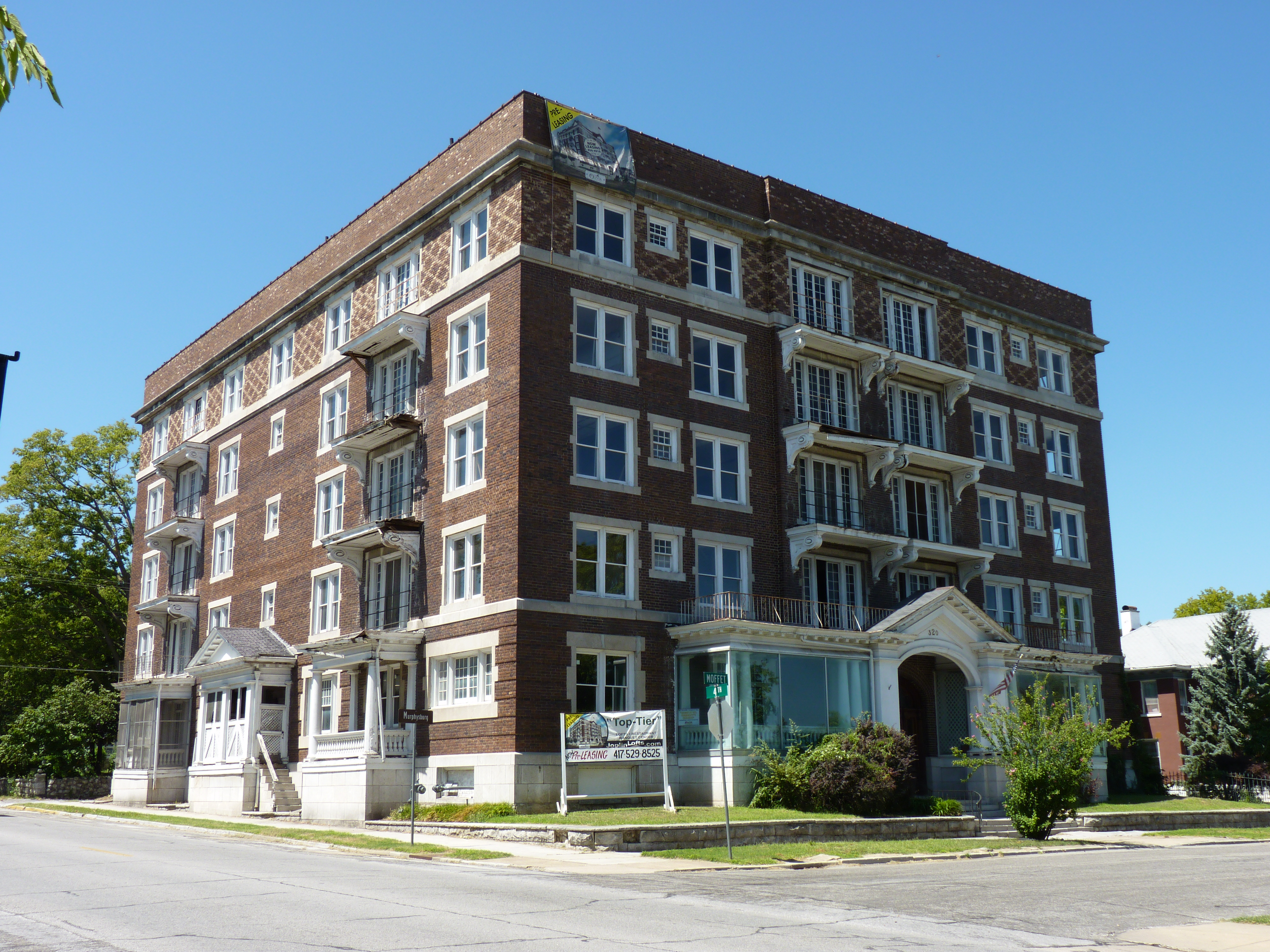

- Location within Missouri Location within the United States
- Location: 320 Moffet, Joplin, Missouri
- Coordinates: 37°5′16″N 94°31′8″W
- Area: less than one acre
- Built: 1906
- Built by: Dieter and Wenzel
- Architect: Allen, Austin
- Architectural style: Late 19th And 20th Century Revivals
- NRHP reference No.: 08000536
- Added to NRHP: June 20, 2008

Olivia Apartments is a historic apartment building located at Joplin, Jasper County, Missouri. It was built in 1906 by a Canadian engineer who moved to Joplin during the mining boom and finished in October of 1906. It is a five-story, U-shaped, red brick building. It measures approximately 100 feet by 125 feet and features Bedford limestone ornamentation and light colored brick cross hatching.

It was listed on the National Register of Historic Places in 2008. It is located in the Murphysburg Historic District.

The apartment consists of 37 bedrooms equipped with built-ins, fireplaces, marble bathrooms with clawfoot tubs, and French doors that opened onto private balconies. The fifth level has two restaurants: a grill room and a more formal dining room. After a century of operation, the City of Joplin deemed the Oliva apartment life threatening in 2006 and instructed its occupants to evacuate.
