= Carthage South Historic District =

Historic district in Missouri, United States

- U.S. National Register of Historic Places
- U.S. Historic district
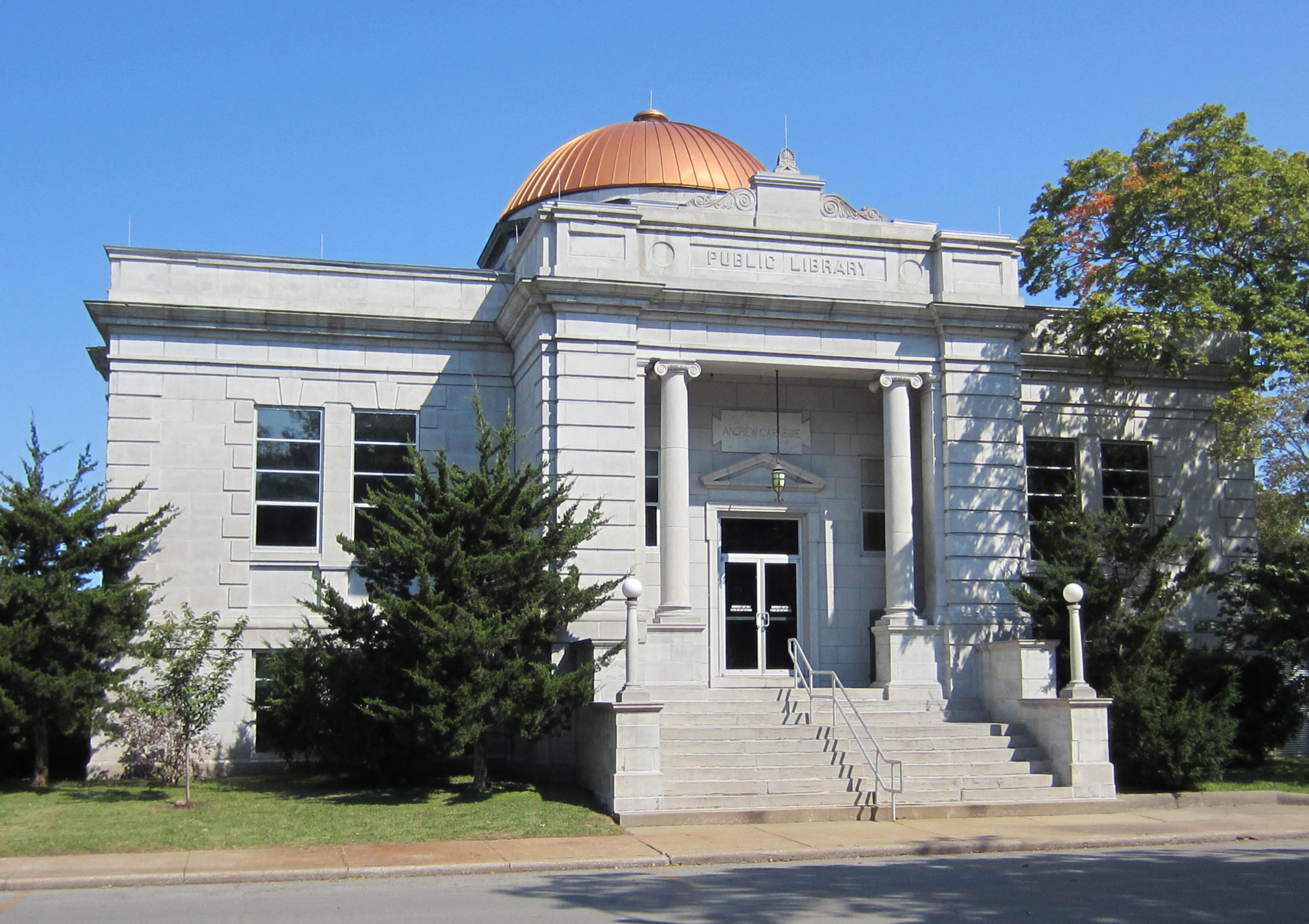
- Carthage Carnegie Library, October 2012

- Location within Missouri Location within the United States
- Location: City limits of Carthage, Carthage, Missouri
- Coordinates: 37°10′08″N 94°18′38″W
- Area: 0 acres (0 ha)
- Built: 1872
- Architect: Multiple
- Architectural style: Bungalow/craftsman, Late Victorian, Box
- MPS: City of Carthage MRA
- NRHP reference No.: 82004915
- Added to NRHP: May 6, 1982

Carthage South Historic District is a national historic district located at Carthage, Jasper County, Missouri. The district encompasses 491 contributing buildings in a predominantly residential section Carthage. It largely developed between about 1875 and 1925 and includes representative examples of Late Victorian and Bungalow / American Craftsman style architecture. Notable buildings include St. Ann's Catholic Church (1908), Former Westminster Presbyterian Church (pre-1888), First United Methodist Church (1925), Carthage Senior High School (1904), First Christian Church (1909), Former Cumberland Presbyterian Church (1892), and Carthage Public Library (1904).

It was listed on the National Register of Historic Places in 1982.
