= Rains Brothers Building =

- U.S. National Register of Historic Places
- U.S. Historic district – Contributing property
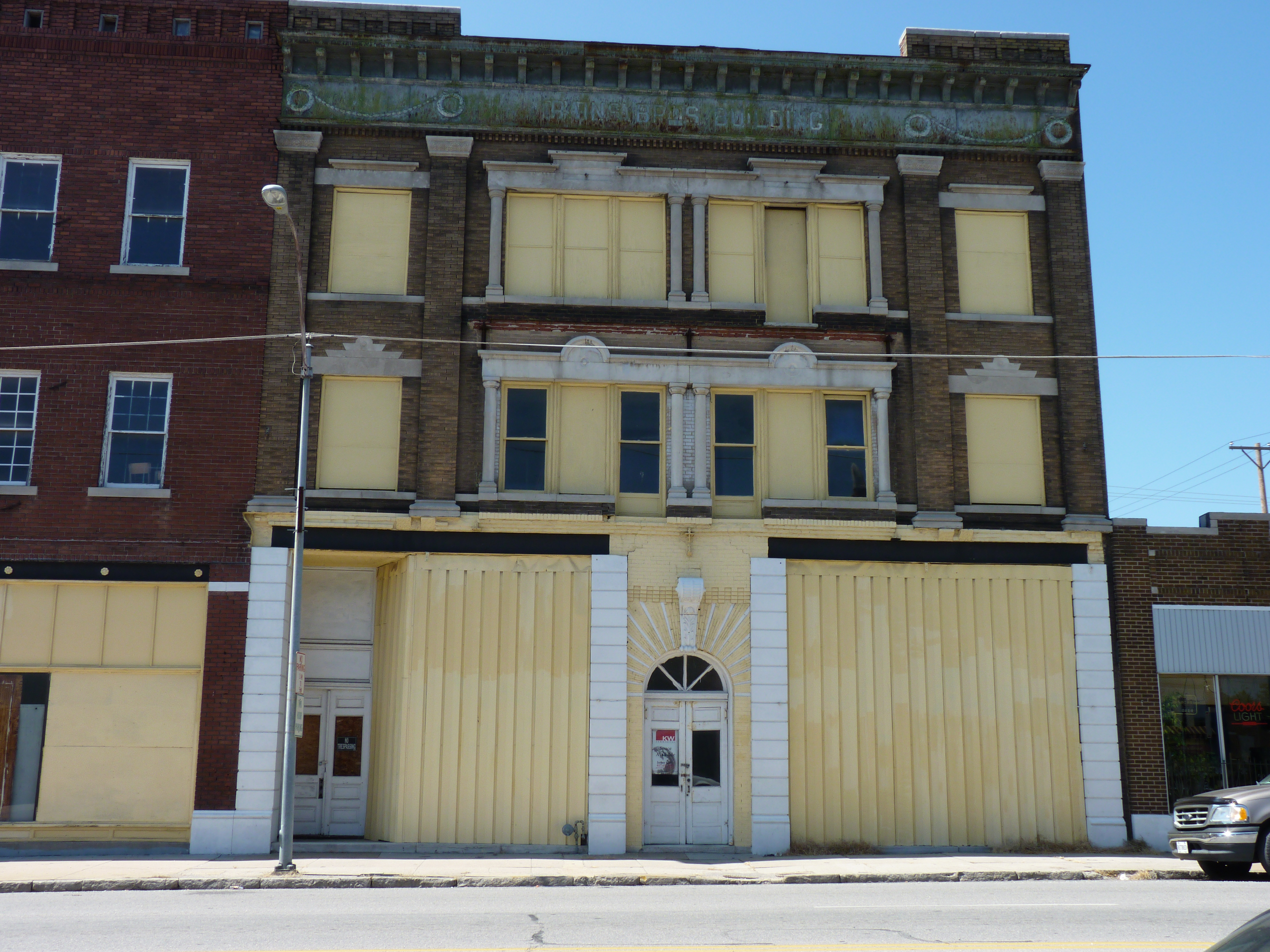

- Location within Missouri Location within the United States
- Location: 906-908 S. Main St., Joplin, Missouri
- Coordinates: 37°4′52″N 94°30′44″W
- Area: less than one acre
- Built: 1900-1901
- Architectural style: Renaissance
- NRHP reference No.: 90001102
- Added to NRHP: July 19, 1990

Rains Brothers Building, also known as Miner's Hardware Company and Roosevelt Hotel, was a historic commercial building located at Joplin, Jasper County, Missouri. It was built in 1900–1901, and was a three-story, three-bay, two-part commercial building with Renaissance Revival style detailing. It was destroyed by fire on March 1, 2012.

It was listed on the National Register of Historic Places in 1990. It was located in the Main and Eighth Streets Historic District.
