= St. Louis and San Francisco Railroad Building (Joplin, Missouri) =

- U.S. National Register of Historic Places
- U.S. Historic district – Contributing property
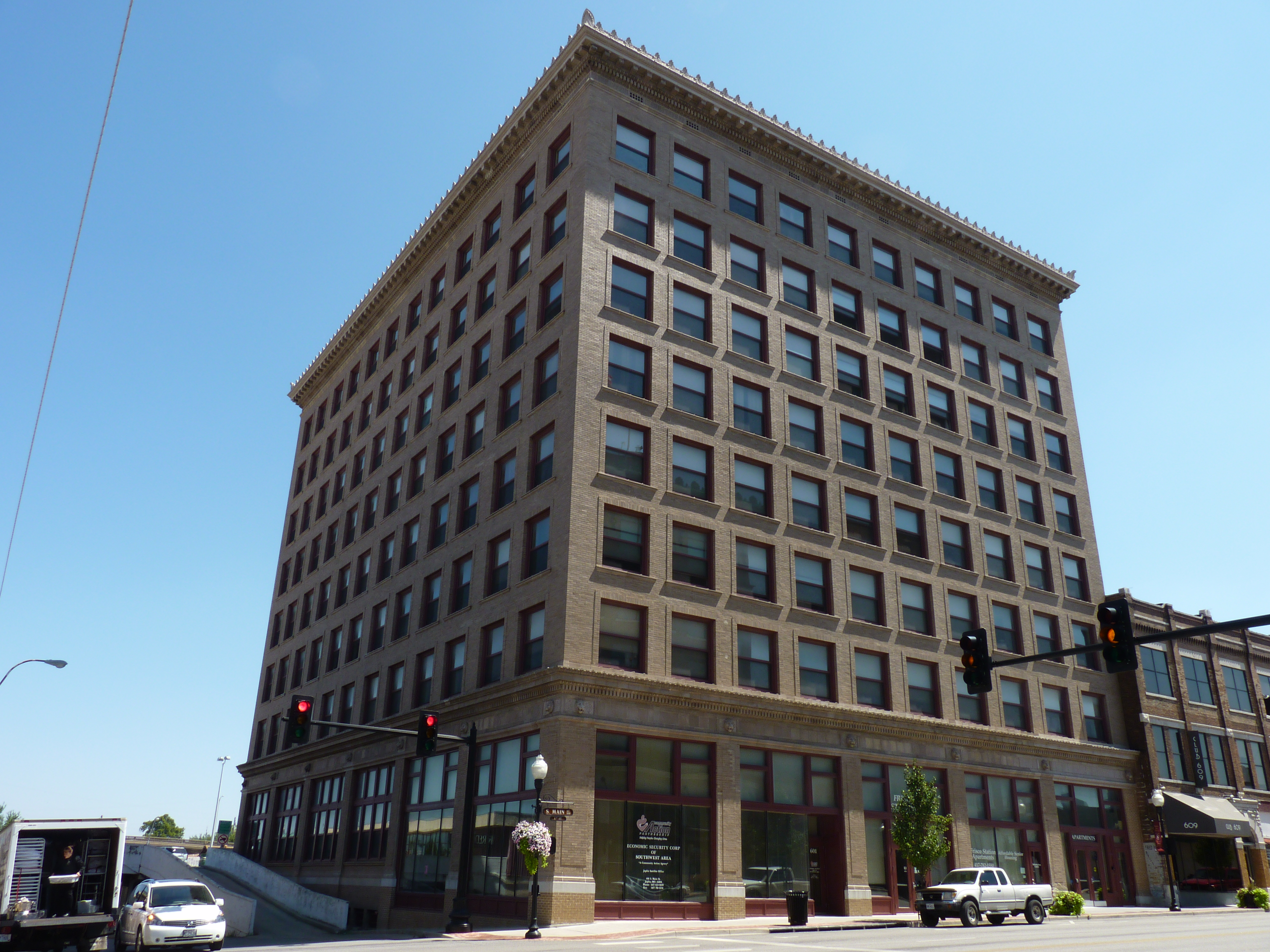

- Location within Missouri Location within the United States
- Location: 605 Main St., Joplin, Missouri
- Coordinates: 37°5′9″N 94°30′47″W
- Area: less than one acre
- Built: 1913
- Built by: Cook, Issac T. Construction Co.
- Architect: Mauran, Russell & Crowell
- Architectural style: Late 19th And Early 20th Century American Movements, Chicago
- NRHP reference No.: 02001193
- Added to NRHP: October 22, 2002

St. Louis and San Francisco Railroad Building, also known as the Frisco Building, is a historic train station and office building located at Joplin, Jasper County, Missouri. It was built in 1913 for the St. Louis and San Francisco Railroad, and is a nine-story, L-shaped, brick-and-stone-trimmed building with a decorative cornice. It measures approximately 101 feet by 127 feet and has a two-part vertical block form.

It was listed on the National Register of Historic Places in 2002. It is located in the Joplin Downtown Historic District.

Preceding station	St. Louis–San Francisco Railway	Following station
Galena toward Ellsworth	Ellsworth – Monett	Webb City toward Monett
Galena toward Oklahoma City	Oklahoma City – Fort Scott	Thoms toward Fort Scott
