= Phelps Country Estate =

Historic house in Missouri, United States

- U.S. National Register of Historic Places
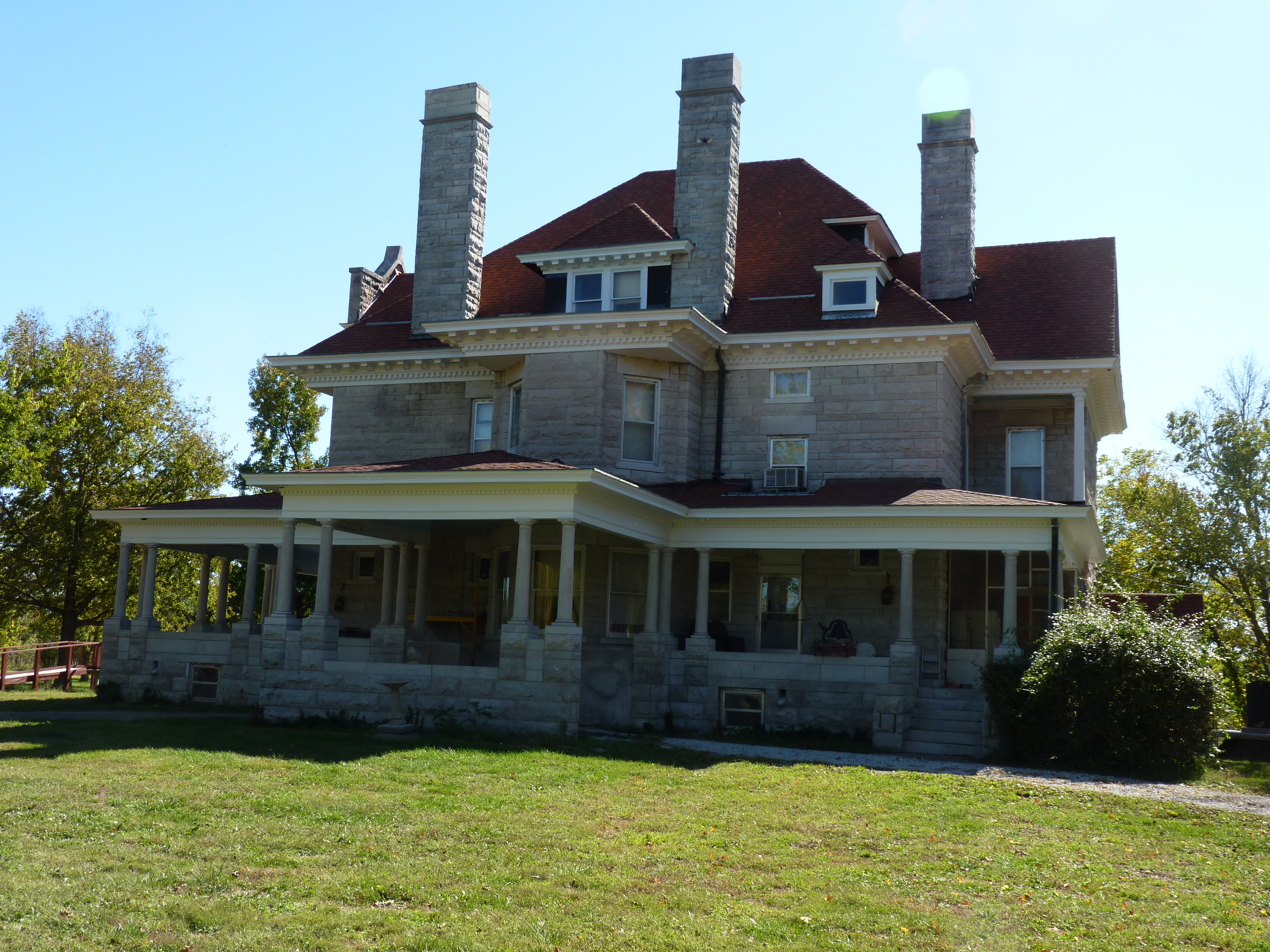
- Phelps Country Estate, October 2010

- Location within Missouri Location within the United States
- Location: RR 1, Newcastle Rd. just west of CR100, near Carthage, Missouri
- Coordinates: 37°15′00″N 94°14′10″W
- Area: 9.6 acres (3.9 ha)
- Built: c. 1900-1904
- Architectural style: Late Victorian
- MPS: City of Carthage MRA
- NRHP reference No.: 83001023
- Added to NRHP: August 29, 1983

Phelps Country Estate is a historic estate developed between about 1900 and 1904 and located near Carthage, Jasper County, Missouri. The main house is a large two-story, eclectic Late Victorian style dwelling constructed of locally quarried Carthage marble. It has a red tile hipped roof and features a wraparound verandah. Also on the property are the contributing well house, caretaker's cottage, carriage house, workshop, silo, and large barn.

It was listed on the National Register of Historic Places in 1983.
