= Gentry Apartments =

- U.S. National Register of Historic Places
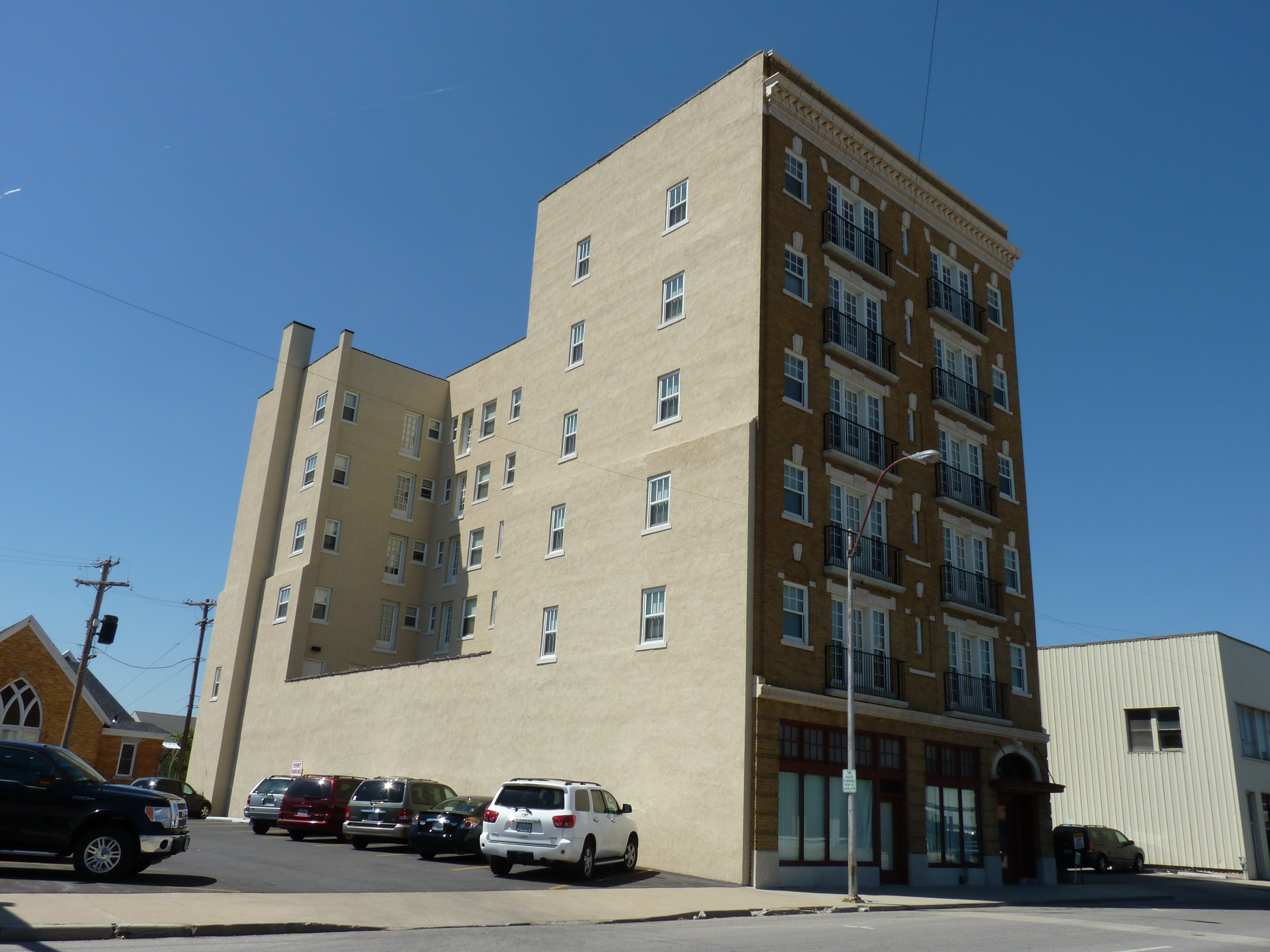

- Location within Missouri Location within the United States
- Location: 318 S. Wall St., Joplin, Missouri
- Coordinates: 37°5′23″N 94°30′57″W
- Area: less than one acre
- Built: 1918
- Built by: Hoffman, Roy
- Architect: Michaelis, August C.
- Architectural style: Early Commercial
- NRHP reference No.: 06000683
- Added to NRHP: August 8, 2006

The Gentry Apartments, also known as Zahn Apartments, is a historic apartment building located at Joplin, Jasper County, Missouri. It was built in 1918, and is a six-story, U-shaped, buff brick building. It measures approximately 45 feet by 120 feet and retains its original open storefront with large display windows and transoms.

It was listed on the National Register of Historic Places in 2006.
