= Joplin =

Joplin may refer to:

== Places ==
- Joplin (crater), on the planet Mercury

=== In the United States ===
- Joplin, Missouri
  - Joplin Downtown Historic District
  - Joplin and Wall Avenues Historic District
  - Joplin School District
  - Joplin metropolitan area
- Joplin Township, Jasper County, Missouri
- Joplin Creek, a stream in Missouri
- Joplin, Montana
- Joplin, Texas
- Joplin, Virginia (now extinct)
- Joplin, West Virginia
- Joplin Branch, a stream in West Virginia

==== Facilities and structures ====
- Peter Joplin Commercial Block, Hot Springs, Arkansas
- Joplin Junior College in Joplin, Missouri
- Joplin High School, a public High School in Joplin, Missouri
- Joplin Regional Airport, a regional airport next to Joplin, Missouri
- Scott Joplin House State Historic Site, St. Louis, Missouri

== People ==
- Joplin (surname), people with the surname, most notably:
  - Janis Joplin (1943–1970), American singer-songwriter
  - Scott Joplin (1867–1917), American ragtime composer
- Joplin Sibtain (born 1969), British actor

== Others ==
- A Night with Janis Joplin, a Broadway musical
- Joplin (software), an open source note taking and to-do application
- Joplin Miners, a defunct minor league baseball team in Joplin, Missouri
- Joplin Tundra, a family of Canadian aircraft
- "Joplin", a development codename of the video game Dragon Age 4
- SS Joplin Victory, the Joplin, a WWII U.S. Victory ship

== See also ==
- Joplin tornado, an extremely deadly tornado that devastated Joplin, Missouri on Sunday, May 22, 2011
- Joplings
- Jopling
