= Prosperity, Missouri =

Unincorporated community in Missouri, U.S.

Prosperity
- Unincorporated community
- Location within the state of Missouri
- Coordinates: 37°07′35″N 94°25′15″W
- Country: United States
- State: Missouri
- County: Jasper
- Township: Joplin
- Elevation: 1,030 ft (310 m)
- Time zone: UTC-6 (Central (CST))
  - Summer (DST): UTC-5 (CDT)
- ZIP code: 64801
- GNIS feature ID: 724960

Prosperity is an unincorporated community in southern Jasper County, in the U.S. state of Missouri. It is northeast of Joplin and just southeast of Webb City, sitting east of Missouri State Highway 249.

== History ==
=== Beginnings ===
Prosperity started as one of the lead and zinc mining camps in the tri-state mining district of southwestern Missouri. It began in 1888 at the site of the Troup Mining Company operation on 40 acres of land. By the next year, twenty mines were in the area, and the settlement had a population of 1500. A post office called Prosperity was established in 1891, and remained in operation until 1920. The community most likely was so named on account of the lucrative local mining industry.

=== Operations ===
Rail lines came in to serve the workers and mines. The Southwest Missouri Electric Railway Company, forerunner of the Southwest Missouri Railroad Company, which had already linked Joplin to Webb City in 1893, was expanded from Webb City in 1894 to Carterville and into Prosperity. The line was further extended in 1903 to link Prosperity with Duenweg. The Missouri Pacific Railway also built a spur. Commerce followed: in its heyday, the settlement had a bank, stores, and other businesses. In 1907, the elaborate Prosperity School building was erected for the schoolchildren of the area.

=== Decline ===
A reduction in lead prices in the late 1920s and other factors resulted in ongoing decline in the settlement. The school closed in 1962. The building was renovated as a bed and breakfast in 1994, but that closed in 2016. Only the school building and some houses mark the old settlement now.

== Geography ==
The community of Prosperity is located northeast of Joplin and just southeast of Carterville. It is localized around the junction between the Missouri Pacific Railroad and Route AA. Prosperity is near the headwaters for Bens Branch of Center Creek.

== Education ==
Public education in the community of Prosperity is administered by Webb City R-VII School District.
