= Blackberry (disambiguation) =

The blackberry is a widespread and well known shrub of the genus Rubus, and its fruit.

Blackberry or Black Berry, may also refer to:

== Botany and food ==
- Blackberry jam fruit (Rosenbergiodendron formosum)
- Common blackberry

== Company and products ==
- BlackBerry Limited, formerly known as Research in Motion Ltd (RIM), with the following products:
  - BlackBerry, smartphones by Blackberry Ltd.
  - BlackBerry 10, the mobile operating system used by BlackBerry devices released between 2013 and 2015
    - List of BlackBerry 10 devices, Devices shipped with the BlackBerry 10 operating system
  - BlackBerry OS, the original operating system used by BlackBerry smartphone devices
    - BlackBerry Bold, QWERTY keyboard smartphones by Research in Motion Ltd
    - BlackBerry Torch, a full-touchscreen line of smartphones by Research in Motion Ltd
    - BlackBerry Curve, an entry-level line of smartphones by Research in Motion Ltd
    - BlackBerry Tour, a previous line of smartphones by Research in Motion Ltd
  - BlackBerry PlayBook, a touchscreen tablet computer by Research in Motion Ltd
    - BlackBerry PlayBook OS, the original operating system for the PlayBook
  - BlackBerry Priv, an Android slider device developed by BlackBerry Limited
  - BlackBerry Messenger, the BlackBerry messenging service
  - BlackBerry Mobile, a licensed BlackBerry manufacturer

== People ==
- Blackberri (1945–2021), American singer-songwriter and community activist
- George Odhiambo (born 1992), Kenyan association footballer known as Blackberry
- Sarah Blackberry (17th century), a Quaker

=== Fictional characters ===
- Blackberry (Watership Down), a fictional rabbit

== Places ==
- Blackberry, Indiana, USA; an unincorporated community
- Blackberry, Minnesota, USA; an unincorporated community in the eponymous township
- Blackberry, Virginia, USA; an unincorporated community
- Blackberry Castle, Portland, Oregon, USA; a castle-form mansion
- Blackberry City, West Virginia, USA; an unincorporated community
- Blackberry Creek (disambiguation), USA; a creek
- Blackberry Farm (disambiguation)
- Blackberry Hill (disambiguation)
- Black Berry Islands, Nunavut, Canada; a group of islands
- Blackberry Run (Pennsylvania), USA; a creek, a run
- Blackberry River (Connecticut), USA; a river
- Blackberry Township (disambiguation)

== Arts, entertainment, media ==
=== Music ===
- The Blackberries (German band), a 1960s German beat band
- The Blackberries, an American musical trio
- "Blackberry" (song), by the Black Crowes
- "Blackberry Way", a song by The Move

=== Stage and screen ===
- BlackBerry (film), a 2023 film
- BlackBerry: Limited Series (TV series), a 2023 TV miniseries version of the eponymous 2023 film BlackBerry

== Other uses ==
- Blackberry Campaign (1791), a 1791 military campaign against the Amerinds of Wabash Valley
- The Blackberry Line, a standard-gauge railway in North Yorkshire, England, UK
- Blackberry coalition, possible government in Germany

== See also ==
- List of BlackBerry products
- Black raspberry
- Blackberry Blossom (disambiguation)
