= Duenweg, Missouri =

- City
- Location of Duenweg, Missouri
- Coordinates: 37°05′03″N 94°24′43″W
- Country: United States
- State: Missouri
- County: Jasper

Government
  - Mayor: Russell Olds

Area
  - Total: 3.07 sq mi (7.96 km^{2})
  - Land: 3.05 sq mi (7.89 km^{2})
  - Water: 0.027 sq mi (0.07 km^{2})
- Elevation: 1,070 ft (330 m)

Population (2020)
  - Total: 1,495
  - Density: 491/sq mi (189.4/km^{2})
- Time zone: UTC-6 (Central (CST))
  - Summer (DST): UTC-5 (CDT)
- ZIP code: 64841
- Area code: 417
- FIPS code: 29-20314
- GNIS feature ID: 2394567
- Website: duenwegmo.com

Duenweg (/dʌnəˈweɪɡ/ dun-ə-WAYG) is a city in Jasper County, Missouri, United States. The population was 1,495 at the 2020 census. It is located within the Township of Joplin, a minor civil division of Jasper County, and is part of the Joplin, Missouri Metropolitan Statistical Area. It is located just to the east of the City of Joplin. Interstate 44 and Interstate 49 run concurrently across the southeast corner of town, and Business Loop 44 runs through the center of town.

== History ==
While the Osage tribe inhabited the general region previously, European-American settlement started in the year 1855, when two brothers, Elijah C. and James C. Webb, from Overton County, Tennessee, moved to the area. Mining in the vicinity later caught the attention of Otto Duenweg and his father, Louis, of Terre Haute, Indiana, who in 1895 purchased significant mining interests at the site. The mining camp became known from that time on as Duenweg in their honor. A post office called Duenweg has been in operation since 1895.

Rail lines came in to serve the workers and mines. The Southwest Missouri Electric Railway Company, forerunner of the Southwest Missouri Railroad Company, which had already linked Joplin, Webb City, Carterville and Prosperity by 1894, was extended south from Prosperity into Duenweg in 1903. The line was indirectly involved in a bank robbery in 1915 when, on February 17, robbers hit the Duenweg Bank, intending to escape on the streetcar to Joplin. When they missed the car by one minute, they attempted and failed to escape on foot.

The settlement was not officially incorporated until 1954, becoming the City of Duenweg. In 2002 the city expanded by annexation to include additional lands to the north and south.

== Geography ==
According to the United States Census Bureau, the city has a total area of 2.04 square miles (5.28 km^{2}), all land.

== Demographics ==
Historical population
Census	Pop.	Note	%±
1960	529		—
1970	656		24.0%
1980	703		7.2%
1990	940		33.7%
2000	1,034		10.0%
2010	1,121		8.4%
2020	1,495		33.4%
U.S. Decennial Census

=== 2010 census ===
As of the census of 2010, there were 1,121 people, 463 households, and 297 families living in the city. The population density was 549.5 inhabitants per square mile (212.2/km^{2}). There were 505 housing units at an average density of 247.5 per square mile (95.6/km^{2}). The racial makeup of the city was 89.7% White, 0.8% African American, 1.5% Native American, 0.1% Asian, 1.8% from other races, and 6.2% from two or more races. Hispanic or Latino of any race were 3.2% of the population.

There were 463 households, of which 34.8% had children under the age of 18 living with them, 44.5% were married couples living together, 12.7% had a female householder with no husband present, 6.9% had a male householder with no wife present, and 35.9% were non-families. 27.9% of all households were made up of individuals, and 9.3% had someone living alone who was 65 years of age or older. The average household size was 2.42 and the average family size was 2.97.

The median age in the city was 36.5 years. 25.9% of residents were under the age of 18; 8.8% were between the ages of 18 and 24; 29.1% were from 25 to 44; 23.9% were from 45 to 64; and 12.3% were 65 years of age or older. The gender makeup of the city was 47.5% male and 52.5% female.

=== 2000 census ===
As of the census of 2000, there were 1,034 people, 425 households, and 295 families living in the city. The population density was 1,949.7 inhabitants per square mile (752.8/km^{2}). There were 458 housing units at an average density of 863.6 per square mile (333.4/km^{2}). The racial makeup of the city was 94.00% White, 0.87% African American, 2.32% Native American, 0.29% Asian, 0.29% from other races, and 2.22% from two or more races. Hispanic or Latino of any race were 1.26% of the population.

There were 425 households, out of which 40.9% had children under the age of 18 living with them, 48.9% were married couples living together, 16.5% had a female householder with no husband present, and 30.4% were non-families. 26.4% of all households were made up of individuals, and 6.8% had someone living alone who was 65 years of age or older. The average household size was 2.43 and the average family size was 2.91.

In the city the population was spread out, with 29.9% under the age of 18, 11.9% from 18 to 24, 32.3% from 25 to 44, 17.2% from 45 to 64, and 8.7% who were 65 years of age or older. The median age was 30 years. For every 100 females, there were 79.5 males. For every 100 females age 18 and over, there were 78.1 males.

The median income for a household in the city was $25,350, and the median income for a family was $29,226. Males had a median income of $24,688 versus $19,167 for females. The per capita income for the city was $12,342. About 13.4% of families and 16.0% of the population were below the poverty line, including 20.9% of those under age 18 and 11.8% of those age 65 or over.

== Education ==
Almost all of Duenweg is in the Joplin School District, while a portion of the city limits extends into the Webb City R-VII School District.

In regards to the Joplin school district parts, residents are zoned to Soaring Heights Elementary School and East Middle School, while all school district residents are zoned to Joplin High School.

Webb City High School is the Webb City district's comprehensive high school.
