= Knights (disambiguation) =

Knights is the plural of knight, a social position originating in the Middle Ages.

Knights may also refer to:

== Games ==
Knight (chess), a piece in chess.

== Organisations ==
- Chivalric orders (and their members):
  - Military orders:
    - Knights Hospitaller, a medieval Catholic military order, still existing with contemporary branches
- Knights of Columbus, a Catholic men's fraternal organization

== People ==
- Darryl Knights (born 1988), a professional English footballer
- David Knights (born 1945), the original bass guitarist in Procol Harum
- Lionel Charles Knights (1906–1997), an English literary critic
- Peter Knights (born 1952), a former Australian rules football player and coach
- Sidney Knights (1898–1968), English soldier

== Places ==
- Knights, Missouri
- Knights Valley AVA, California wine region in Sonoma County
- Left Hand, West Virginia, a community in the United States also known as Knights

== Culture ==
- The Knights (orchestra), an orchestra in New York City
- The Knights a satirical play by Aristophanes
- Knights (film), a 1993 science fiction film directed by Albert Pyun

== Sports teams ==
- Knights (cricket team), a South African cricket franchise
- Charlotte Knights, a Triple-A baseball team from Charlotte, North Carolina
- Franken Knights, an American Football team from Germany
- Letran Knights, varsity teams of Colegio de San Juan de Letran
  - Letran Knights basketball, basketball team
- London Knights, an Ontario Hockey League team
- Newcastle Knights, an Australian rugby league team
- New York Knights (rugby league), an American rugby league team
- Shreveport Knights, a professional American football team in 1999
- UCF Knights, the University of Central Florida sports teams
- Vegas Golden Knights, an NHL team in Las Vegas
- York Knights, an English rugby league team

== Other ==
- Knights Inn, a hotel chain
- Knights of Bahá'u'lláh, a title for Bahá'ís given by Shoghi Effendi
- Knights (video game), an arcade game released in 1994
- "Knights", a song by Crystal Castles from their self-titled debut album

== See also ==
- Knight (disambiguation)
