= Sheridan Township, Nebraska =

Sheridan Township, Nebraska may refer to the following places:

- Sheridan Township, Clay County, Nebraska
- Sheridan Township, Holt County, Nebraska
- Sheridan Township, Phelps County, Nebraska

See also

- Sheridan Township (disambiguation)
