= Blackberry Creek (Missouri) =

Stream in the American state of Missouri

Blackberry Creek is a stream in Jasper and Barton counties of southwest Missouri. It is a tributary of Spring River.

The stream headwaters are located at 37°23′46″N 94°35′20″W and the confluence with the Spring River is at 37°15′07″N 94°33′10″W. The stream source is located in the southwest corner of Barton County about 3.5 miles west of the community of Nashville and three mile east of the Missouri–Kansas border. The stream flows south to southeast into northwest Jasper County and passes under state routes H and M to join the Spring River east of Waco and southwest of Galesburg.

Blackberry Creek was named for the blackberry bushes lining its banks.

== See also ==
- List of rivers of Missouri
