= Turkey Creek (Spring River tributary) =

Stream in the U.S. state of Missouri

Turkey Creek is a stream in Jasper and Newton counties of southwest Missouri and Cherokee county of southeastern Kansas in the United States. It is a tributary of the Spring River.

The stream headwaters arise in Newton County at 37°01′03″N 94°23′03″W in Newton County at an elevation of approximately 1170 feet. The stream flows to the north into Jasper County and passes under I-44 southeast of Duenweg. It the turns to the northwest and flows past through the north side of Joplin passing under U.S. Route 71 and Missouri Route 43. It continues to the west-northwest past the community of Belleville and into southeastern Kansas. Its confluence with the Spring River is one-half mile west of the Missouri-Kansas state line at 37°07′47″N 94°37′36″W at an elevation of 814 feet.

Turkey Creek was named for the wild turkeys along its course.

== See also ==
- List of rivers of Kansas
- List of rivers of Missouri
