= Jobling =

Jobling is a surname. Notable people with the surname include:

- Andrew Jobling (born 1964), Australian rules footballer
- Curtis Jobling (born 1972), English illustrator, animator and author
- James Wesley Jobling (1876–1961), American physician and professor
- Joe Jobling (1906–1969), English footballer
- John Jobling (1937–2022), Australian politician
- Karen Jobling (born 1962), English cricketer
- Keith Jobling (1934–2020), English footballer
- Kevin Jobling (born 1968), English footballer
- Robert Jobling (1841–1923), British artist
