= Golden Knights =

Golden Knights may refer to:

- United States Army Parachute Team, commonly known as the "Golden Knights"
- Vegas Golden Knights, a National Hockey League team
- Golden Knights (chess), the US's annual correspondence chess tournament
- Clarkson Golden Knights, Clarkson University's athletics teams
- "Golden Knights", pre-2007 name for the UCF Knights
- "Golden Knights", the College of Saint Rose's athletics teams
- "Golden Knights", James Madison High School (Brooklyn)'s athletics teams

== See also ==
- Golden (disambiguation)
- Knight (disambiguation)
- The Golden Knight, 1970 Hong Kong film
- Gold Coast Knights SC, soccer team in Gold Coast, Queensland, Australia
- Ghosts 'n Goblins: Gold Knights, two video games, "Gold Knights I" and "Gold Knights II" in the Ghosts 'n Goblins game series
