= Knight (disambiguation) =

Knight is a social position and honour originating in the Middle Ages.

Knight may also refer to:

== People ==
- Member of an order of chivalry
- Knight Bachelor
- Knight (surname)

== Places ==
- Knight, United States Virgin Islands
- Knight, Wisconsin, a town in the United States
- Knight Inlet, British Columbia, Canada
- Knight Islands, Nunavut, Canada
- Knight Township, Vanderburgh County, Indiana, United States

== Organisms ==
- Knight butterfly, the species Lebadea martha
- Knight mushrooms, the genus Tricholoma

== Arts and media ==
=== Gaming ===
- Knight (playing card)
- Knight (chess)
- Knight, a troop featured in Clash Royale
- Knight (Dungeons & Dragons), a roleplaying game character class
- The Knight, the main character in the 2017 video game Hollow Knight
- The Roaring Knight, or simply the Knight, a character in Deltarune

=== Characters in other fiction ===
- Jedi Knight, a rank between Padawan and Master in Star Wars
- Knight (DC Comics), any of several people
- Knight, a fictional character in the Duel Masters TV series
- The Knight (Canterbury Tales), a character in the Chaucer stories
- Michael Knight, the protagonist from Knight Rider
- Kamen Rider Knight, a character in Kamen Rider Ryuki

=== Other uses in arts and media ===
- Demon Knight, a 1995 movie
- The Knight (novel), a fantasy novel by Gene Wolfe
- Knight Books, a former imprint of the publisher Hodder & Stoughton

== Other uses ==
- Knight Capital Group, a global financial services firm
- Knight's Armament Company, an American firearms manufacturer

== See also ==
- Knights Landing, California
- Knights (disambiguation)
- Justice Knight (disambiguation)
