= Lincoln Township, Jasper County, Missouri =

Township in Jasper County, Missouri, USA

Coordinates: 37.29798°N 94.12269°W

Lincoln Township is a township in Jasper County, in the U.S. state of Missouri. Its population was 270 per the 2020 Census.

It was founded on February 7, 1873. The first school-house was erected in 1858 and the first post-office was established at Maple Grove in 1879.

Lincoln Township has the name of President Abraham Lincoln.

== Demographics ==
=== 2020 census ===
Lincoln Township, Jasper County, Missouri – Racial and Ethnic Composition (NH = Non-Hispanic) Note: the US Census treats Hispanic/Latino as an ethnic category. This table excludes Latinos from the racial categories and assigns them to a separate category. Hispanics/Latinos may be of any race.
Race / Ethnicity	Pop 2000	Pop 2010	Pop 2020	% 2000	% 2010	2020
White alone (NH)	256	276	223	98.84%	93.24%	82.59%
Black or African American alone (NH)	2	0	0	0.77%	0.00%	0.00%
Native American or Alaska Native alone (NH)	0	1	3	0.00%	0.34%	1.11%
Asian alone (NH)	0	0	5	0.00%	0.00%	1.85%
Pacific Islander alone (NH)	0	0	0	0.00%	0.00%	0.00%
Some Other Race alone (NH)	0	0	1	0.00%	0.00%	0.37%
Mixed Race/Multi-Racial (NH)	1	0	15	0.39%	0.00%	5.56%
Hispanic or Latino (any race)	0	19	23	0.00%	6.42%	8.52%
Total	259	296	270	100.00%	100.00%	100.00%
