= Lone Elm =

Lone Elm may refer to:

- Lone Elm, Kansas
- Lone Elm, Cooper County, Missouri
- Lone Elm, Jasper County, Missouri
