= Preston Township, Jasper County, Missouri =

Inactive township in the US state of Missouri

Coordinates: 37.305°N 94.360°W

Preston Township is an inactive township in Jasper County, in the U.S. state of Missouri.

Preston Township takes its name from the community of Preston.
