= Jasper County, Missouri =

County in Missouri, United States

- County
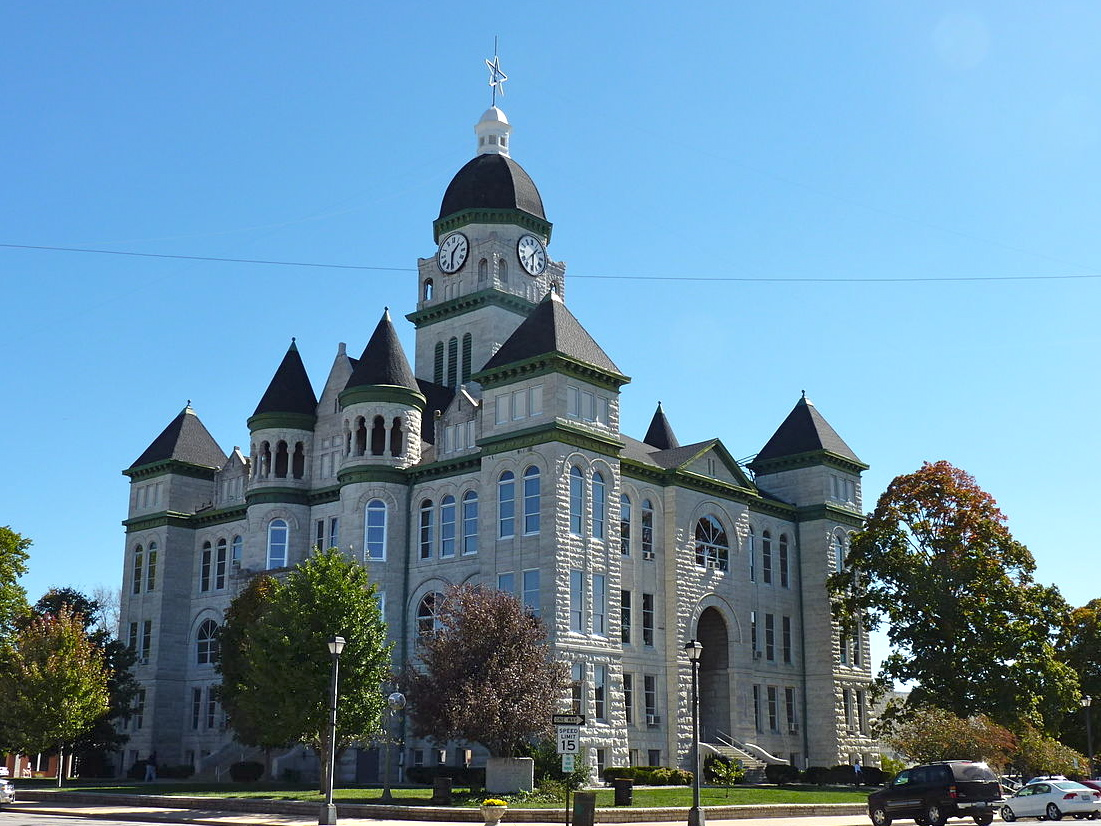
- Jasper County Courthouse in Carthage (August 2008)

- Location within the U.S. state of Missouri
- Coordinates: 37°12′N 94°20′W
- Country: United States
- State: Missouri
- Founded: January 2, 1841
- Named for: William Jasper
- Seat: Carthage
- Largest city: Joplin

Area
  - Total: 641 sq mi (1,660 km^{2})
  - Land: 638 sq mi (1,650 km^{2})
  - Water: 2.8 sq mi (7.3 km^{2}) 0.4%

Population (2020)
  - Total: 122,761
  - Estimate (2025): 127,428 ▲
  - Density: 192/sq mi (74.3/km^{2})
- Time zone: UTC−6 (Central)
  - Summer (DST): UTC−5 (CDT)
- Congressional district: 7th
- Website: www.jaspercountymo.gov

Jasper County is located in the southwest portion of the U.S. state of Missouri. As of the 2020 census, the population was 122,761. Its county seat is Carthage, and its largest city is Joplin. The county was organized in 1841 and named for William Jasper, a hero of the American Revolutionary War. Jasper County is included in the Joplin Metropolitan Statistical Area. The Jasper County Sheriff's Office has legal jurisdiction throughout the county.

== History ==
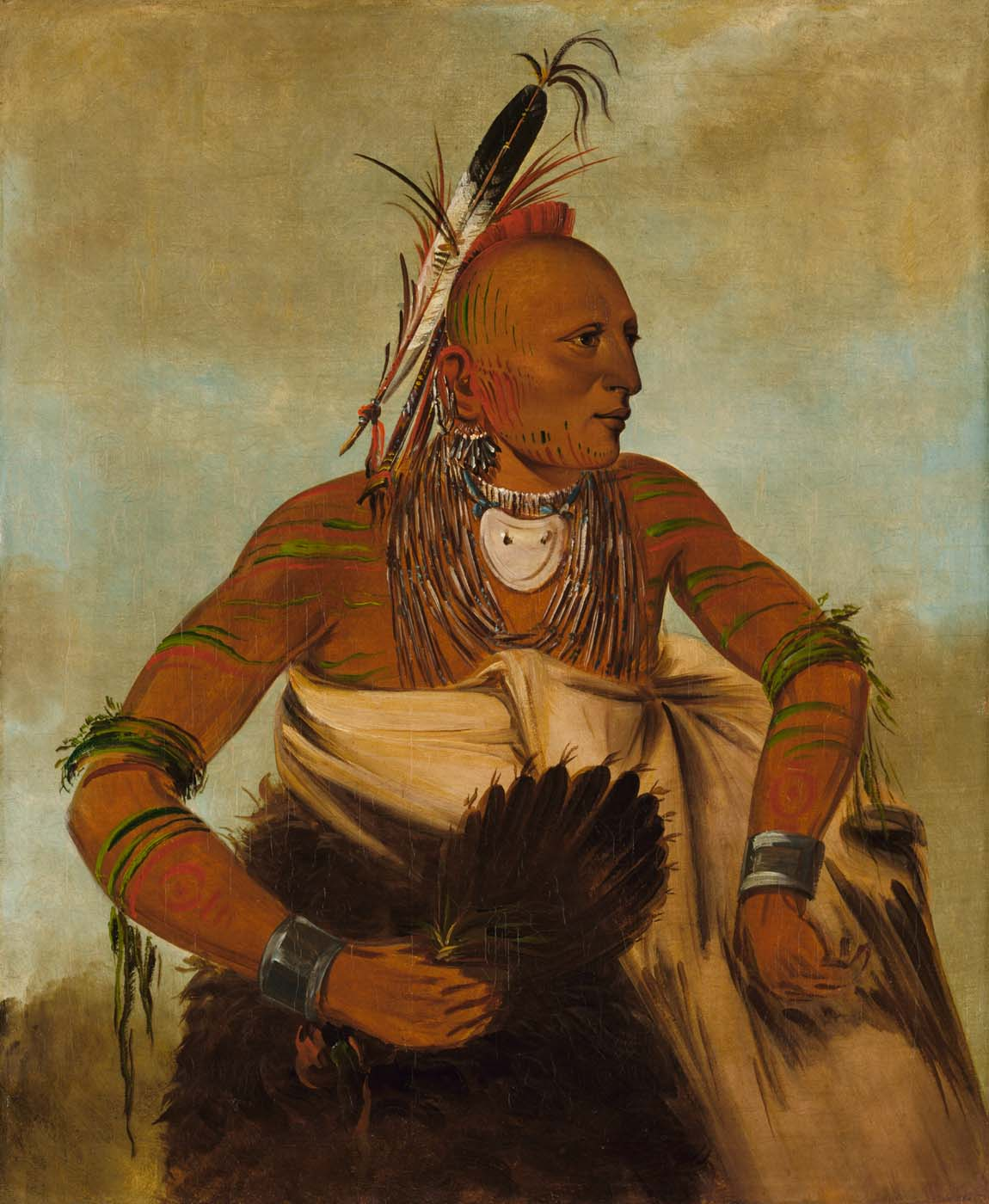
Portrait of an Osage warrior, painted by George Catlin in 1834

=== Osage Nation ===
Before European contact, the area that today makes up Jasper County was the domain of the Osage Native Americans, who called themselves the "Children of the Middle Waters" (Ni-U-Kon-Ska). A Siouan language tribe, they had migrated west and south centuries before from the Ohio Valley.

They were powerful and dominated a large territory encompassed the land between the Missouri and Osage rivers to the north, the Mississippi River to the east, and the Arkansas River to the south. To the west were the Great Plains, where they hunted buffalo. By the late 17th century, the Osage were calling themselves Wah-Zha-Zhe.

The earliest record of European-Osage contact is a 1673 map by French Jesuit priest and explorer Jacques Marquette. He noted the people he encountered as the Ouchage, his way of pronouncing the sound of the name with French spelling conventions. A few years after the Marquette expedition, French explorers discovered a Little Osage village and called it Ouazhigi. French transliterations of the tribe's name settled on a spelling of Osage, which was later adopted by English-speaking European Americans.

In 1682 Robert de La Salle canoed down the length of the Mississippi River to the Gulf of Mexico, claiming and naming the entire Mississippi basin as "La Louisiane" in honor of King Louis XIV. In 1699 Louisiana was designated as an administrative district of New France. The European colonists and nationals (France, England and Spain) considered this to be French territory. The French divided the Louisiana district into upper and lower parts, with the Arkansas River as the dividing line.

After France and Spain's defeat by Great Britain in the Seven Years' War in 1763, France ceded Louisiana to Spain and most of the rest of New France, on the east side of the Mississippi River, to the British. They exchanged Cuba with Spain and took over east Florida. For a few decades, the Spanish District of New Madrid, containing present-day Jasper County, was the southernmost of the five Spanish districts comprising Upper Louisiana. France regained control of Louisiana through the secret Treaty of San Ildefonso in 1800, but in 1803, following defeat of his troops in an effort to retake the colony of Saint Domingue in the Caribbean, Napoleon Bonaparte I decided to sell his North American territory to the United States in what is known as the Louisiana Purchase.

The Osage began treaty-making with the United States in 1808 with the first cession of lands in Missouri in the (Osage Treaty). The Osage moved from their homelands on the Osage River in 1808 to the Jasper County area of southwest Missouri. In 1825, the Osages ceded their traditional lands across present-day Missouri, Arkansas, and Oklahoma (then known as Indian Territory). They were first moved onto a southeastern Kansas reservation in the Cherokee Strip, on which the city of Independence, Kansas developed. In 1872 they were forced to move again, south to Indian Territory.

=== Missouri Territory ===
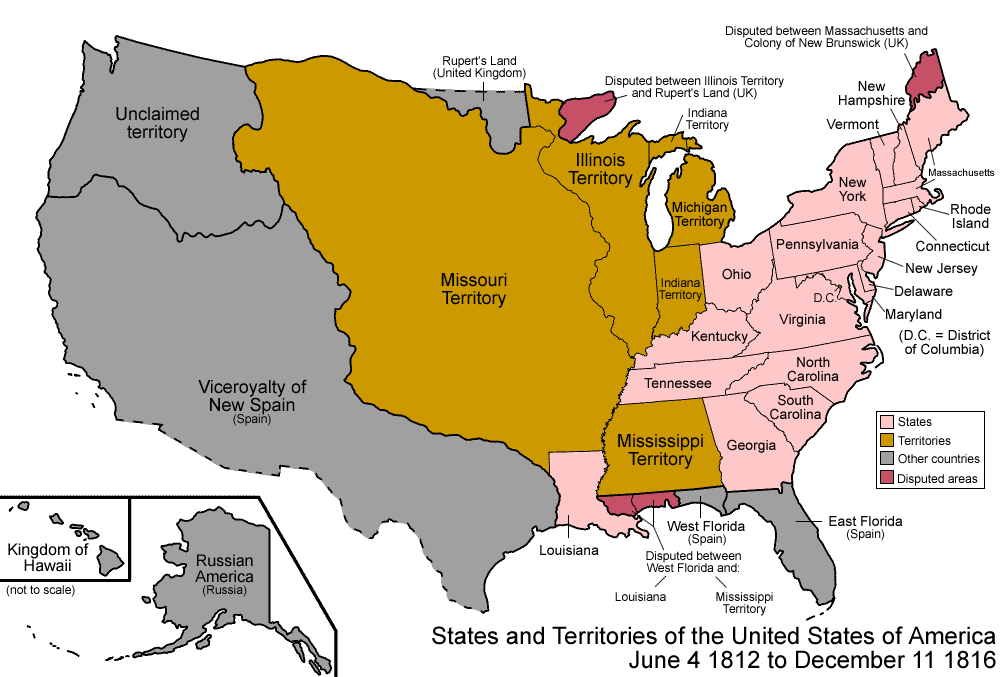
Map defining borders of Missouri Territory, 1812

The Upper Louisiana Territory, including the Jasper County area, was renamed as the Missouri Territory on June 4, 1812, to avoid confusion with the state of Louisiana. This had joined the Union in 1812. The new New Madrid District became New Madrid County, Missouri Territory. Old Lawrence County was established in 1815 from New Madrid County west of the St. Francis River and north of Arkansas County. It originally consisted of all of present-day southwestern Missouri and part of northwestern Arkansas.

Three years later (1818), Lawrence County was combined with part of Cape Girardeau County and renamed as Wayne County. By 1819, Arkansas Territory had been created; Wayne County lost some of its area but still consisted of most of southern Missouri: from present-day Wayne County west to the Kansas State Line and bordered on the south by the Arkansas State Line.

In 1820, all of Missouri Territory was admitted to the Union as the state of Missouri. In 1831, with increased population in the region, Crawford County was carved from the original Wayne. This new division covered all of the southern part of Missouri and included Jasper County in its boundaries. This alignment was also short-lived; in 1833 Greene County was organized from Crawford County, and extended from the Niangua River west to the Kansas State Line.

On January 5, 1835, a big piece was cut out of Greene County and organized as Barry County. In 1838 Barry County was divided into four parts called Barry, Dade, Newton and Jasper counties. At this time Jasper was not a full-fledged county but was attached to Newton County and it would remain so until 1841.

=== County organization ===
Log home of George Hornback, used as the initial Jasper County Courthouse in 1841. It has been preserved and can be viewed on the grounds of the Old Cabin Shop at 155 North Black Powder Lane in Carthage.

On January 29, 1841, the Missouri Legislature enacted a bill authorizing formation of Jasper County; it was named in honor of Sergeant William Jasper, a hero in the American Revolutionary War. The Jasper County Court initially divided the area into three townships: North Fork, Center Creek and Marion. Later it was organized as 15 townships, which continue as unincorporated jurisdictions.

The county court, as a temporary seat of justice, was established on February 25, 1841, in the home of George Hornback. It was a 12×16-foot log cabin, one and a half miles northwest of Carthage on Spring River. The officers of the court were Charles S. Yancey, judge, and Elwood B. James, clerk. Mount Vernon attorney Robert W. Crawford was appointed circuit attorney pro tem. John P. Osborn, the first sheriff, gave public notice that the county court of Jasper County would meet in the home of George Hornback until the permanent seat of justice was established. The first session of the court was two days; the proceedings covered four pages of record.

A permanent county seat was chosen in March 1842 and designated by the name of Carthage. The courthouse, a one-story single-room wooden structure with a large door in the south, was completed on June 29, 1842. It was located on the north side of the present public square in Carthage. This courthouse was later replaced by a larger two-story brick-and-stone structure that was completed in 1854; it also had facilities in the building for the county jail. At the second term of the court held in October of the same year, attorneys Robert W. Crawford and John R. Chenault were cited for contempt and fined the sum of ten dollars for "fighting in the presence and view of said court during the said sitting."

At the March 1861 Secession Convention held in Jefferson City, Chenault represented Jasper County while Crawford represented Lawrence County. Possibly for their own self-preservation, and to buy time to make preparations in Southwest Missouri for the war, the two former adversaries voted in favor of keeping Missouri in the Union. Missouri was the only state whose secession convention resulted in voting to stay in the Union.

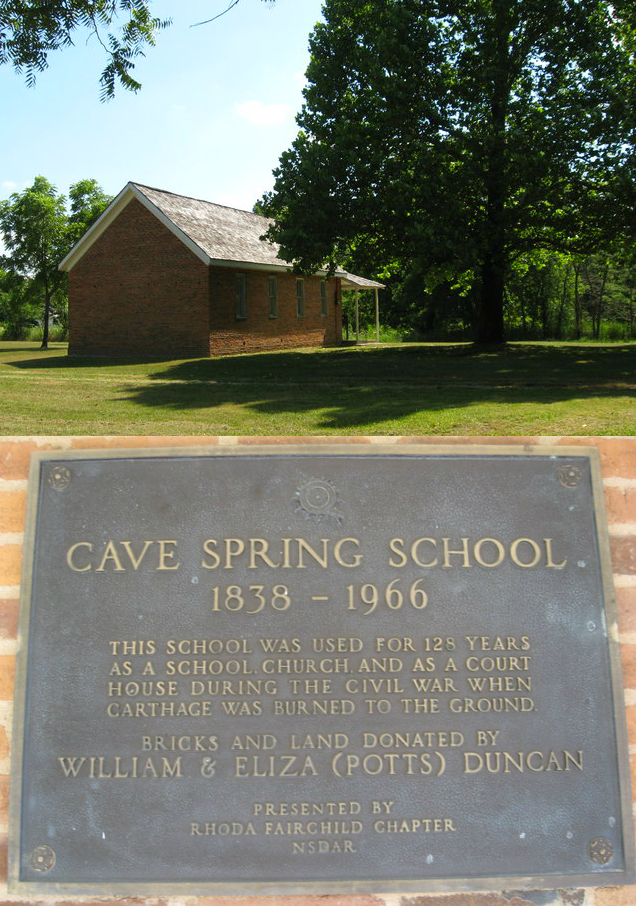
Cave Spring School, the site of Jasper County Circuit Court in 1865, is located at 4323 County Road 4 near La Russell.

At the outset of the war Chenault, by then a circuit court judge, moved with his family to Texas. Following the Battle of Carthage, on July 12, 1861, Crawford was elected Lieutenant Colonel of the 13th Missouri Cavalry Regiment and 5th Missouri Infantry, both of the 8th Division, Missouri State Guard. They were part of the Confederate States Army (CSA), although Missouri remained with the Union. After leading the 13th Cavalry Regiment into numerous battles, in a command that included two of his sons in first lieutenant and quartermaster ranks, Crawford moved his noncombatant family to Texas for safety.

He served as a recruiter for the Confederate Army in Missouri, a post he was nominated for by Waldo P. Johnson, formerly a United States senator from Missouri in a letter to Missouri governor-in-exile Claiborne Fox Jackson dated October 24, 1862.

By the start of the American Civil War in 1861, there were several small river mill settlements, some mining camps, and about nine or ten towns (seven platted) in Jasper County, Missouri. The county seat of Carthage, Missouri had an estimated population of between four and five hundred at that time. The newer brick courthouse was used as a hospital during the Civil War and was destroyed by fire during fighting in October 1863. By the end of the war, Carthage had been evacuated and completely destroyed, and much of Jasper County laid in ruins. Other than military tribunals, no courts were held in Jasper County between May 11, 1861, and October 10, 1865.

By order of the Governor in 1865, the courthouse was relocated to the pioneer schoolhouse at Cave Springs (near present-day La Russell, Missouri), with John C. Price of Mount Vernon appointed as the circuit court judge. Price later (before?) served as treasurer of the United States under President James Buchanan. The county court operated in other temporary locations within the county until the current Jasper County Courthouse was constructed on Carthage square in the mid-1890s.

The county adopted an official flag in 2001, which was unveiled during the county's 160th birthday celebration. The flag depicts the county courthouse surrounded by 15 stars, representing Jasper County's 15 townships. The center blue and red stars memorialize the struggle in Jasper County during the Civil War years, including the Battle of Carthage in 1861 and second battle in 1863.

=== Towns established prior to the Civil War ===
Current town name	Accepted date founded	Official date of plat	Notes
Sarcoxie	1833	1840	The first settlement in Jasper County Missouri, initially known as "Centerville". The first settler was Thackeray Vivion in 1831.
(Old) Jasper	1840	1842	Was located northeast of Carthage and no longer exists. Later, another settlement named Jasper existed southeast of Carthage. The present town of Jasper, Missouri, north of Carthage, is a different community previously known as Coon Creek settlement or "Midway".
Carthage	1841	1842	Historic Carthage was planned from the start with the purpose of being the Jasper County seat and was promptly rebuilt after being completely destroyed during the Civil War. The current Jasper County Courthouse was erected in the mid-1890s.
(Old) Sherwood	1846	1856	First called "Rural" and was located near present-day Webb City. It was not rebuilt after being destroyed during the Civil War and no longer exists.
Oronogo	1848	1856	Known as "Minersville" around the time of the Civil War, it evolved from early mining camps and had other names such as "Leadville Hollow". The post office had also used the name "Center Mines".
(Old) Medoc	1848	After the Civil War	Started as an old Indian trading post near the Kansas state line, it was destroyed during the Civil War and later resettled, but the plat was abandoned by the 20th century and the town no longer exists.
Avilla	1856	1858	Founded by merchant-landowners as a business center on the edge of the frontier in the mid-1850s. The citizens of Avilla formed a town militia for defense at the beginning of the Civil War and the site later served as a Union Army garrison (Enrolled Missouri Militia), subsequently prevailing intact and undamaged after the war. The town's growth was ultimately stunted after being bypassed by the railroad in the latter 19th century and it remains a small village in the 21st century today.
Fidelity	1856	After the Civil War	Considered to have been founded by William Cloe about the same time as Avilla for similar reasons (mirroring it in some ways), Fidelity was not platted until after the Civil War.
Waco	1857	After the Civil War, 1878	Started as an old trading post first known as "Loshick"
(Old) Preston	1859	1860	A village northwest of Carthage, plat abandoned and town no longer exists.

== Geography ==
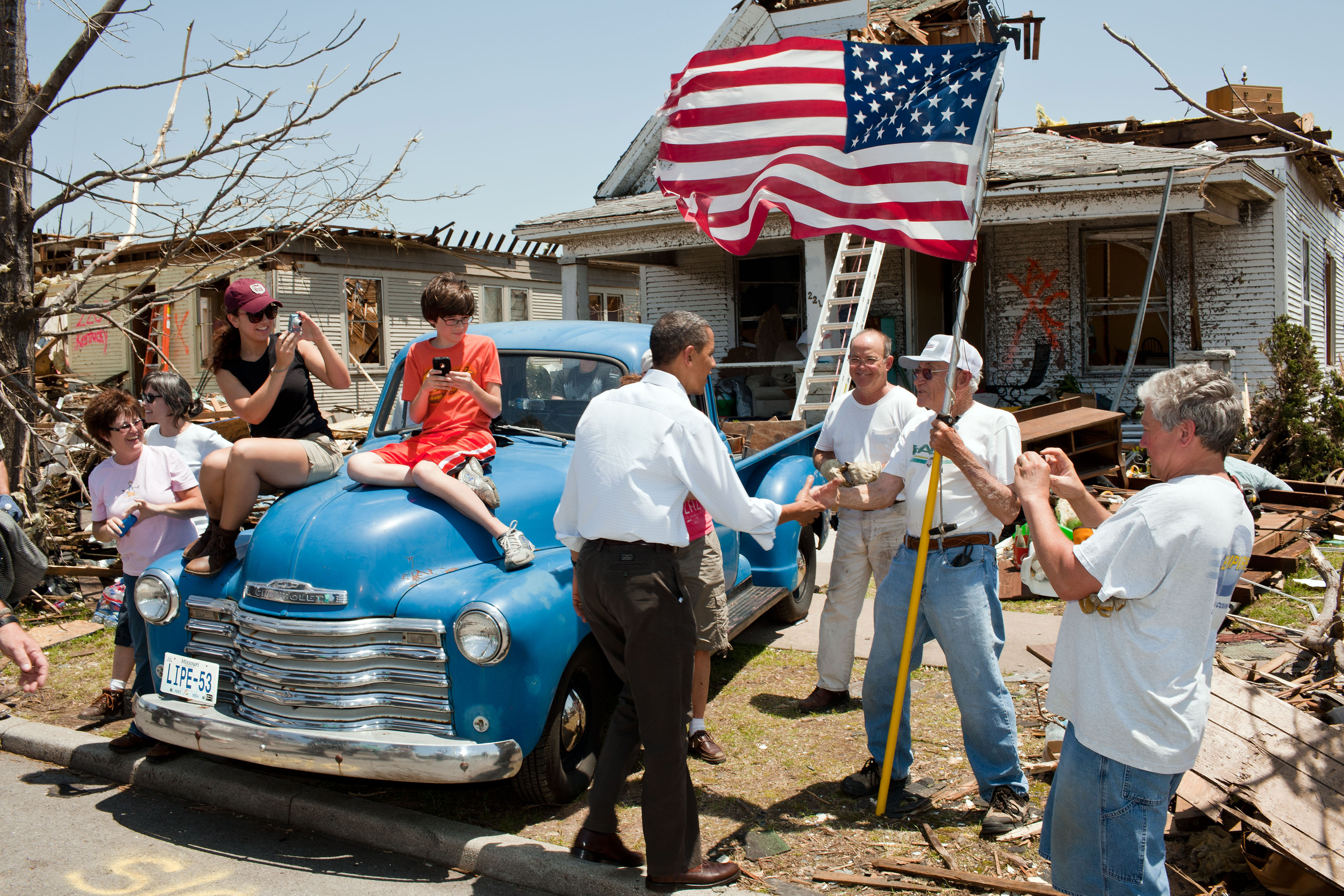
President Barack Obama greets a tornado survivor on May 29, 2011, in Joplin.

According to the U.S. Census Bureau, the county has a total area of 641 square miles (1,660 km^{2}), of which 638 square miles (1,650 km^{2}) is land and 2.8 square miles (7.3 km^{2}) (0.4%) is water.

On Sunday, May 22, 2011, Jasper County was struck in Joplin with a catastrophic EF5 multiple-vortex tornado . The 2011 Joplin tornado ranked as the seventh deadliest in America's history.

=== Adjacent counties ===
- Barton County (north)
- Dade County (northeast)
- Lawrence County (east)
- Newton County (south)
- Cherokee County, Kansas (west)
- Crawford County, Kansas (northwest)

=== Major highways ===
- I-44
  - I-44 BL (Joplin)
  - I-44 BL (Sarcoxie)
- I-49 / US 71
  - I-49 BL (Joplin) – former US 71 Bus.
- Route 37
- Route 43
- Route 66 – former US 66
- Route 96
- Route 171
- Route 249 – temporary designation I-49 Alt.
- Route 571 – former US 71 Alt.

== Demographics ==
Historical population
Census	Pop.	Note	%±
1850	4,223		—
1860	6,883		63.0%
1870	14,928		116.9%
1880	32,019		114.5%
1890	50,500		57.7%
1900	84,018		66.4%
1910	89,673		6.7%
1920	75,941		−15.3%
1930	73,810		−2.8%
1940	78,705		6.6%
1950	79,106		0.5%
1960	78,863		−0.3%
1970	79,852		1.3%
1980	86,958		8.9%
1990	90,465		4.0%
2000	104,686		15.7%
2010	117,404		12.1%
2020	122,761		4.6%
2025 (est.)	127,428	▲	3.8%
U.S. Decennial Census; 1790-1960 1900-1990; 1990-2000 2010-2019

=== 2020 census ===
As of the 2020 census, the county had a population of 122,761 and a median age of 36.0 years. 24.8% of residents were under the age of 18 and 15.9% of residents were 65 years of age or older. For every 100 females there were 95.6 males, and for every 100 females age 18 and over there were 93.1 males age 18 and over.

The racial makeup of the county was 80.3% White, 1.9% Black or African American, 1.8% American Indian and Alaska Native, 1.2% Asian, 0.4% Native Hawaiian and Pacific Islander, 5.5% from some other race, and 8.9% from two or more races. Hispanic or Latino residents of any race comprised 9.3% of the population.

76.5% of residents lived in urban areas, while 23.5% lived in rural areas.

There were 48,119 households in the county, of which 31.9% had children under the age of 18 living with them and 27.6% had a female householder with no spouse or partner present. About 28.7% of all households were made up of individuals and 11.8% had someone living alone who was 65 years of age or older.

There were 52,739 housing units, of which 8.8% were vacant. Among occupied housing units, 61.8% were owner-occupied and 38.2% were renter-occupied. The homeowner vacancy rate was 1.9% and the rental vacancy rate was 8.7%.

=== Racial and ethnic composition ===
Jasper County, Missouri – racial and ethnic composition Note: the US Census treats Hispanic/Latino as an ethnic category. This table excludes Latinos from the racial categories and assigns them to a separate category. Hispanics/Latinos may be of any race.
Race / ethnicity (NH = Non-Hispanic)	Pop 1980	Pop 1990	Pop 2000	Pop 2010	Pop 2020	% 1980	% 1990	% 2000	% 2010	% 2020
White alone (NH)	84,252	86,530	95,336	101,019	96,388	96.89%	95.65%	91.07%	86.04%	78.52%
Black or African American alone (NH)	1,008	1,147	1,520	2,166	2,260	1.16%	1.27%	1.45%	1.84%	1.84%
Native American or Alaska Native alone (NH)	687	1,471	1,341	1,617	1,894	0.79%	1.63%	1.28%	1.38%	1.54%
Asian alone (NH)	340	495	714	1,160	1,491	0.39%	0.55%	0.68%	0.99%	1.21%
Native Hawaiian or Pacific Islander alone (NH)	x	x	46	233	440	x	x	0.04%	0.20%	0.36%
Other race alone (NH)	46	25	66	92	388	0.05%	0.03%	0.06%	0.08%	0.32%
Mixed-race or multiracial (NH)	x	x	2,048	3,090	8,523	x	x	1.96%	2.63%	6.94%
Hispanic or Latino (any race)	625	797	3,615	8,027	11,377	0.72%	0.88%	3.45%	6.84%	9.27%
Total	86,958	90,465	104,686	117,404	122,761	100.00%	100.00%	100.00%	100.00%	100.00%

=== 2010 census ===
As of the census of 2010, there were 117,404 people, 45,639 households, and 30,202 families residing in the county. The population density was 164 people per square mile (63 people/km^{2}). There were 50,668 housing units at an average density of 71 units per square mile (27/km^{2}). The racial makeup of the county was 88.24% White, 1.93% Black or African American, 1.51% Native American, 0.99% Asian, 0.25% Pacific Islander, 3.89% from other races, and 3.18% from two or more races. Approximately 6.84% of the population were Hispanic or Latino of any race.

There were 45,639 households, out of which 30.8% had children under the age of 18 living with them, 48.7% were married couples living together, 12.4% had a female householder with no husband present, and 33.8% were non-families. 33.4% of all households were made up of individuals, and 24.8% had someone living alone who was 65 years of age or older. The average household size was 2.52 and the average family size was 3.05

In the county, the population was spread out, with 27.17% under the age of 19, 7.4% from 20 to 24, 25.11% from 25 to 44, 22.24% from 45 to 64, and 12.14% who were 65 years of age or older. The median age was 35.1 years. For every 100 females, there were 94.10 males. For every 100 females age 18 and over, there were 90.20 males.

The median income for a household in the county was $31,323, and the median income for a family was $37,611. Males had a median income of $28,573 versus $20,386 for females. The per capita income for the county was $16,227. About 10.40% of families and 14.50% of the population were below the poverty line, including 19.20% of those under age 18 and 10.30% of those age 65 or over.

== Education ==
Unified K-12 school districts covering parts of the county, no matter how small, including those which have offices and/or schools in other counties, include:

- Carl Junction R-I School District
- Carthage R-9 School District
- Diamond R-IV School District
- Golden City R-III School District
- Jasper County R-V School District
- Joplin School District
- Sarcoxie R-II School District
- School District of Webb City R-7

There is also a single elementary school district, Avilla R-XIII School District.

=== Public schools ===
- Avilla R-XIII School District – Avilla
  - Avilla Elementary/Middle School (K-08)
- Carl Junction R-I School District – Carl Junction
  - Carl Junction Primary School (K-01)
  - Carl Junction Primary School (02-03)
  - Carl Junction Intermediate School (04-06)
  - Carl Junction Junior High School (07-08)
  - Carl Junction High School (09-12)
- Carthage R-9 School District – Carthage
  - Columbian Elementary School (PK-04)
  - Fairview Elementary School (PK-04)
  - Mark Twain Elementary School (PK-04)
  - Pleasant Valley Elementary School (PK-04)
  - Steadley Elementary School (PK-04)
  - Carthage Middle School (05-06)
  - Carthage Junior High School (07-08)
  - Carthage High School (09-12)
- Jasper R-V School District – Jasper
  - Jasper County Elementary School (K-06)
  - Jasper High School (07-12)
- Joplin School District – Joplin
  - Memorial Education Center (PK)
  - Cecil Floyd Elementary School (K-05)
  - Columbia Elementary School (K-05)
  - Soaring Heights Elementary School (K-05)
  - Eastmorland Elementary School (PK-05)
  - Irving Elementary School (K-05)
  - Jefferson Elementary School (K-05)
  - Kelsey Norman Elementary School (K-05)
  - McKinley Elementary School (K-05)
  - Royal Heights Elementary School (K-05)
  - Stapleton Elementary School (K-05)
  - West Central Elementary School (K-05)
  - East Middle School (06-08)
  - North Middle School (06-08)
  - South Middle School (06-08)
  - Joplin High School (09-12)
- Sarcoxie R-II School District – Sarcoxie
  - Wildwood Elementary School (PK-05)
  - Sarcoxie High School (06-12)
- School District of Webb City R-7 – Webb City
  - Franklin Early Childhood Center (PK)
  - Madge T. James Kindergarten Center (PK-K)
  - Bess Truman Primary Center (K-01)
  - Webster Primary Center (01-02)
  - Carterville Elementary School (PK-04)
  - Eugene Field Elementary School (03-04)
  - Harry S. Truman Elementary School (02-04)
  - Mark Twain Elementary School (03-04)
  - Webb City Middle School (05-06)
  - Webb City Junior High School (07-08)
  - Webb City High School (09-12)

=== Private schools ===
- Thomas Jefferson Independent Day School – Joplin (K-12) – Nonsectarian (Special Education)
- Joplin Area Catholic Schools – Joplin (PK-12) – Roman Catholic
  - St. Mary's Elementary School (PK-05)
  - St. Peter's Middle School (06-08)
  - McAuley Catholic High School (09-12)
- Martin Luther School – Joplin (PK-08) – Lutheran
- New Heights Christian Academy – Joplin (PK-12) – Nondenominational Christian
- St. Ann's Catholic School – Carthage (PK-06) – Roman Catholic

=== Post-secondary ===
- Missouri Southern State University - Joplin. A public, four-year university.
- Ozark Christian College - Joplin. A private, four-year college associated with the independent Christian churches and churches of Christ.

==== Branch campuses ====
- Crowder College - Joplin and Webb City. A public, two-year community college. Main Campus is in Neosho, Missouri.
- Kansas City University - Joplin. A private medical school. Home of the university's College of Dental Medicine since 2023. Main Campus is in Kansas City, Missouri.

=== Public libraries ===
- Carthage Public Library
- Joplin Public Library
- Sarcoxie Public Library
- Webb City Public Library

== Communities ==
=== Cities ===
- Alba
- Asbury
- Carl Junction
- Carterville
- Carthage (county seat)
- Duenweg
- Jasper
- Joplin (small portion in Newton County; largest city)
- La Russell
- Neck City
- Oronogo
- Purcell
- Reeds
- Sarcoxie
- Waco
- Webb City

=== Villages ===
- Airport Drive
- Avilla
- Brooklyn Heights
- Carytown
- Duquesne
- Fidelity

=== Unincorporated communities ===
- Belleville
- Bowers Mill
- Dudenville
- Galesburg
- Kendricktown
- Knights
- Lone Elm
- Maple Grove
- Maxville
- Medoc
- Parshley
- Preston
- Prosperity
- Scotland
- Tuckahoe

=== Former community ===
- Oakland Park

=== Townships ===
- Duval
- Galena
- Jackson
- Jasper
- Joplin
- Lincoln
- Madison
- Marion
- McDonald
- Mineral
- Preston
- Sarcoxie
- Sheridan
- Twin Groves
- Union

== Politics ==
=== Local ===
The Republican Party completely controls politics at the local level in Jasper County. Republicans hold every elected position in the county. In 2016, Hillary Clinton received 21.9% of the vote in Jasper County, lower than any Democratic presidential candidate in the county's history.

Jasper County, Missouri

Elected countywide officials
Assessor	Lisa Perry	Republican
Auditor	Sarah Hoover	Republican
Circuit Clerk	Melissa Holcomb	Republican
County Clerk	Charlie Davis	Republican
Collector	Steven E. McIntosh	Republican
Commissioner (presiding)	John Bartosh	Republican
Commissioner (district 1)	Tom Flanigan	Republican
Commissioner (district 2)	Mike Landis	Republican
Coroner	Randy Nace	Republican
Prosecuting Attorney	Theresa Kenney	Republican
Public Administrator	Angela Casavecchia	Republican
Recorder	Charlotte Pickering	Republican
Sheriff	Randee Kaiser	Republican
Treasurer	Shannon Karraker	Republican

=== State ===
==== Gubernatorial ====
Past gubernatorial election results
Year	Republican	Democratic	Third parties
2024	73.55% 39,119	24.04% 12,785	2.41% 1,282
2020	72.30% 37,714	25.30% 13,204	2.30% 1,242
2016	69.11% 33,436	27.36% 13,236	3.53% 1,710
2012	53.78% 24,218	43.21% 19,457	3.01% 1,356
2008	58.61% 27,764	39.42% 18,676	1.97% 932
2004	74.54% 33,293	24.30% 10,853	1.16% 519
2000	65.31% 24,335	32.75% 12,203	1.94% 721
1996	56.55% 18,977	40.63% 13,637	2.82% 946

==== Senate ====
All of Jasper County is a part of Missouri's 32nd District in the Missouri Senate and is represented by Jill Carter (R-Joplin).

Missouri Senate — District 32 — Jasper County (2022)
Party	Candidate	Votes	%	±%
Republican	Jill Carter	29,378	100.00%	

Missouri Senate — District 32 — Jasper County (2018)
Party	Candidate	Votes	%	±%
Republican	Bill White	28,678	71.66%	
Democratic	Carolyn McGowan	10,032	25.07%	
Green	Conor Gillis	1,309	3.27%	

Missouri Senate — District 32 — Jasper County (2014)
Party	Candidate	Votes	%	±%
Republican	Ron Richard	19,362	100.00%	

==== House of Representatives ====
Jasper County is divided into four districts in the Missouri House of Representatives, all of which are held by Republicans.

- District 127 — Ann Kelley (R-Lamar) consists of northern and eastern parts of the county.

District 127 election history
2020 redistricting cycle results

Missouri House of Representatives — District 127 — Jasper County (2024)
Party	Candidate	Votes	%	±%
Republican	Ann Kelley (incumbent)	5,685	86.81%	−0.37
Democratic	Marvin Manring	864	13.19%	+0.37

Missouri House of Representatives — District 127 — Jasper County (2022)
Party	Candidate	Votes	%	±%
Republican	Ann Kelley (incumbent)	3,698	87.18%	
Democratic	Marvin Manring	544	12.82%	

2010 redistricting cycle results

Missouri House of Representatives — District 127 — Jasper County (2020)
Party	Candidate	Votes	%	±%
Republican	Ann Kelley (incumbent)	6,923	100.00%	

Missouri House of Representatives — District 127 — Jasper County (2018)
Party	Candidate	Votes	%	±%
Republican	Ann Kelley	4,988	84.39%	−0.71
Democratic	Teri Hanna	923	15.61%	+0.71

Missouri House of Representatives — District 127 — Jasper County (2016)
Party	Candidate	Votes	%	±%
Republican	Mike Kelley (incumbent)	5,690	85.10%	
Independent	George R. Parsons	996	14.90%	

Missouri House of Representatives — District 127 — Jasper County (2014)
Party	Candidate	Votes	%	±%
Republican	Mike Kelley (incumbent)	3,034	100.00%	

Missouri House of Representatives — District 127 — Jasper County (2012)
Party	Candidate	Votes	%	±%
Republican	Mike Kelley	5,857	100.00%	

- District 161 — Lane Roberts (R-Joplin) consists of the city of Joplin.

District 161 election history
2020 redistricting cycle results

Missouri House of Representatives — District 161 — Jasper County (2024)
Party	Candidate	Votes	%	±%
Republican	Lane Roberts (incumbent)	8,490	63.96%	
Democratic	Shawna Ackerson	4,783	36.04%	

Missouri House of Representatives — District 161 — Jasper County (2022)
Party	Candidate	Votes	%	±%
Republican	Lane Roberts (incumbent)	6,819	100.00%	

2010 redistricting cycle results

Missouri House of Representatives — District 161 — Jasper County (2020)
Party	Candidate	Votes	%	±%
Republican	Lane Roberts (incumbent)	7,517	67.04%	+1.29
Democratic	Joshua Shackles	3,696	32.96%	−1.29

Missouri House of Representatives — District 161 — Jasper County (2018)
Party	Candidate	Votes	%	±%
Republican	Lane Roberts	5,646	65.75%	−6.70
Democratic	Elizabeth Lundstrum	2,941	34.25%	+6.70

Missouri House of Representatives — District 161 — Jasper County (2016)
Party	Candidate	Votes	%	±%
Republican	Bill White (incumbent)	8,953	100.00%	

Missouri House of Representatives — District 161 — Jasper County (2014)
Party	Candidate	Votes	%	±%
Republican	Bill White (incumbent)	3,092	72.45%	
Democratic	Charles Shields	1,176	27.55%	

Missouri House of Representatives — District 161 — Jasper County (2012)
Party	Candidate	Votes	%	±%
Republican	Bill White	7,789	100.00%	

- District 162 — Robert Bromley (R-Carl Junction) consists of a western part of the county.

District 162 election history
2020 redistricting cycle results

Missouri House of Representatives — District 162 — Jasper County (2024)
Party	Candidate	Votes	%	±%
Republican	Robert Bromley (incumbent)	15,495	100.00%	

Missouri House of Representatives — District 162 — Jasper County (2022)
Party	Candidate	Votes	%	±%
Republican	Robert Bromley (incumbent)	9,869	100.00%	

2010 redistricting cycle results

Missouri House of Representatives — District 162 — Jasper County (2020)
Party	Candidate	Votes	%	±%
Republican	Robert Bromley	14,588	100.00%	

Missouri House of Representatives — District 162 — Jasper County (2018)
Party	Candidate	Votes	%	±%
Republican	Charlie Davis (incumbent)	8,916	68.35%	
Democratic	Sarah Hinkle	3,762	28.84%	
Green	Mollie Dyer	367	2.81%	

Missouri House of Representatives — District 162 — Jasper County (2016)
Party	Candidate	Votes	%	±%
Republican	Charlie Davis (incumbent)	13,941	100.00%	

Missouri House of Representatives — District 162 — Jasper County (2014)
Party	Candidate	Votes	%	±%
Republican	Charlie Davis (incumbent)	6,263	100.00%	

Missouri House of Representatives — District 162 — Jasper County (2012)
Party	Candidate	Votes	%	±%
Republican	Charlie Davis	12,893	100.00%	

- District 163 — Cathy Loy (R-Carthage) consists of a central part of the county east of Joplin, including the county seat Carthage.

District 163 election history
2020 redistricting cycle results

Missouri House of Representatives - District 163 - Jasper County (2024)
Party	Candidate	Votes	%	±%
Republican	Cathy Lo Joy	11,855	78.34%	
Democratic	Philip D. Wilson	3,278	21.66%	

Missouri House of Representatives - District 163 - Jasper County (2022)
Party	Candidate	Votes	%	±%
Republican	Cody Smith (incumbent)	8,911	100.00%	

2010 redistricting cycle results

Missouri House of Representatives - District 163 - Jasper County (2020)
Party	Candidate	Votes	%	±%
Republican	Cody Smith (incumbent)	12,268	79.77%	+1.77
Democratic	Aaron Hailey	3,218	20.23%	−1.77

Missouri House of Representatives - District 163 - Jasper County (2018)
Party	Candidate	Votes	%	±%
Republican	Cody Smith (incumbent)	9,567	78.00%	−4.32
Democratic	Chad Fletcher	2,698	22.00%	+4.32

Missouri House of Representatives - District 163 - Jasper County (2016)
Party	Candidate	Votes	%	±%
Republican	Cody Smith	13,502	100.00%	

Missouri House of Representatives — District 163 — Jasper County (2014)
Party	Candidate	Votes	%	±%
Republican	Tom Flanigan (incumbent)	5,850	82.32%	
Democratic	Michael Jarrett	1,256	17.68%	

Missouri House of Representatives — District 163 — Jasper County (2012)
Party	Candidate	Votes	%	±%
Republican	Tom Flanigan	12,663	100.00%	

=== Federal ===
==== Presidential ====
United States presidential election results for Jasper County, Missouri
Year	Republican		Democratic		Third party(ies)	
Year	No.	%	No.	%	No.	%
1888	4,522	48.90%	3,684	39.84%	1,042	11.27%
1892	5,369	44.19%	4,805	39.55%	1,976	16.26%
1896	4,835	40.39%	7,026	58.69%	111	0.93%
1900	8,747	45.91%	9,658	50.69%	647	3.40%
1904	7,851	50.53%	6,006	38.66%	1,680	10.81%
1908	9,143	49.02%	8,130	43.59%	1,379	7.39%
1912	4,571	27.36%	6,789	40.64%	5,344	31.99%
1916	9,358	44.48%	10,513	49.97%	1,166	5.54%
1920	17,074	58.42%	11,006	37.66%	1,145	3.92%
1924	13,701	55.11%	9,176	36.91%	1,983	7.98%
1928	20,587	70.85%	8,292	28.54%	180	0.62%
1932	11,788	39.82%	17,349	58.60%	467	1.58%
1936	14,440	41.75%	19,822	57.31%	323	0.93%
1940	18,755	50.54%	18,249	49.17%	107	0.29%
1944	17,301	56.77%	13,111	43.02%	63	0.21%
1948	14,593	48.52%	15,404	51.21%	81	0.27%
1952	23,065	61.00%	14,665	38.78%	82	0.22%
1956	20,414	60.36%	13,404	39.64%	0	0.00%
1960	21,804	59.30%	14,962	40.70%	0	0.00%
1964	15,481	46.18%	18,045	53.82%	0	0.00%
1968	16,794	54.24%	10,987	35.49%	3,181	10.27%
1972	22,482	74.61%	7,652	25.39%	0	0.00%
1976	17,086	53.15%	14,910	46.38%	153	0.48%
1980	21,664	62.49%	11,953	34.48%	1,049	3.03%
1984	23,066	71.36%	9,259	28.64%	0	0.00%
1988	19,934	63.92%	11,159	35.78%	94	0.30%
1992	17,592	49.04%	11,727	32.69%	6,553	18.27%
1996	18,361	54.39%	11,462	33.95%	3,938	11.66%
2000	24,899	66.43%	11,737	31.31%	845	2.25%
2004	31,846	70.64%	13,002	28.84%	237	0.53%
2008	31,667	65.67%	15,730	32.62%	822	1.70%
2012	31,349	69.33%	12,809	28.33%	1,060	2.34%
2016	35,070	72.57%	10,572	21.88%	2,684	5.55%
2020	37,728	72.07%	13,549	25.88%	1,075	2.05%
2024	39,084	72.64%	13,943	25.91%	780	1.45%

==== U.S. Senate ====
U.S. Senate — Missouri — Jasper County (2024)
Party	Candidate	Votes	%	±%
Republican	Josh Hawley (incumbent)	38,129	71.33%	−1.25
Democratic	Lucas Kunce	13,518	25.29%	+0.79
Libertarian	W.C. Young	825	1.54%	−0.72
Better Party	Jared Young	706	1.32%	
Green	Nathan Kline	279	0.52%	−0.60

U.S. Senate — Missouri — Jasper County (2022)
Party	Candidate	Votes	%	±%
Republican	Eric Schmitt	25,183	72.58%	+3.89
Democratic	Trudy Busch Valentine	8,500	24.50%	−2.10
Libertarian	Jonathan Dine	785	2.26%	+0.67
Constitution	Paul Venable	231	0.07%	

U.S. Senate — Missouri — Jasper County (2018)
Party	Candidate	Votes	%	±%
Republican	Josh Hawley	27,743	68.69%	+2.34
Democratic	Claire McCaskill (incumbent)	10,745	26.60%	−1.90
Independent	Craig O'Dear	807	2.00%	
Libertarian	Japheth Campbell	642	1.59%	−0.97
Green	Jo Crain	451	1.12%	−0.02

U.S. Senate — Missouri — Jasper County (2016)
Party	Candidate	Votes	%	±%
Republican	Roy Blunt	32,123	66.35%	+11.47
Democratic	Jason Kander	13,799	28.50%	−10.56
Libertarian	Jonathan Dine	1,240	2.56%	−3.50
Green	Johnathan McFarland	552	1.14%	+1.14
Constitution	Fred Ryman	699	1.44%	+1.44

U.S. Senate — Missouri — Jasper County (2012)
Party	Candidate	Votes	%	±%
Republican	Todd Akin	24,563	54.88%	
Democratic	Claire McCaskill (incumbent)	17,485	39.06%	
Libertarian	Jonathan Dine	2,713	6.06%	

==== U.S. House of Representatives ====
All of Jasper County is included in Missouri's 7th Congressional District and is represented by Eric Burlison (R-Springfield) in the U.S. House of Representatives.

U.S. House of Representatives — Missouri's 7th Congressional District — Jasper County (2024)
Party	Candidate	Votes	%	±%
Republican	Eric Burlison (incumbent)	38,823	73.65%	−0.33
Democratic	Missi Hesketh	12,685	24.06%	+0.26
Libertarian	Kevin Craig	1,205	2.29%	+0.07

U.S. House of Representatives — Missouri's 7th Congressional District — Jasper County (2022)
Party	Candidate	Votes	%	±%
Republican	Eric Burlison	25,657	73.98%	+2.27
Democratic	Kristen Radaker-Sheafer	8,253	23.80%	−0.35
Libertarian	Kevin Craig	770	2.22%	−1.65

U.S. House of Representatives — Missouri's 7th Congressional District — Jasper County (2020)
Party	Candidate	Votes	%	±%
Republican	Billy Long (incumbent)	36,897	71.71%	+1.47
Democratic	Teresa Montseny	12,424	24.15%	−1.97
Libertarian	Kevin Craig	1,459	3.87%	+0.23
Write-In	Audrey Richards	144	0.28%	

U.S. House of Representatives — Missouri's 7th Congressional District — Jasper County (2018)
Party	Candidate	Votes	%	±%
Republican	Billy Long (incumbent)	28,146	70.24%	−0.59
Democratic	Jamie Daniel Schoolcraft	10,465	26.12%	+1.61
Libertarian	Benjamin T. Brixey	1,459	3.64%	−1.01

U.S. House of Representatives — Missouri's 7th Congressional District — Jasper County (2016)
Party	Candidate	Votes	%	±%
Republican	Billy Long (incumbent)	33,855	70.83%	−1.81
Democratic	Genevieve Williams	11,681	24.51%	+2.61
Libertarian	Benjamin T. Brixey	2,218	4.65%	−0.77

U.S. House of Representatives — Missouri's 7th Congressional District — Jasper County (2014)
Party	Candidate	Votes	%	±%
Republican	Billy Long (incumbent)	15,989	72.64%	+4.43
Democratic	Jim Evans	4,819	21.90%	−5.56
Libertarian	Kevin Craig	1,193	5.42%	+1.09

U.S. House of Representatives — Missouri's 7th Congressional District — Jasper County (2012)
Party	Candidate	Votes	%	±%
Republican	Billy Long	30,145	68.21%	
Democratic	Jim Evans	12,138	27.46%	
Libertarian	Kevin Craig	1,913	4.33%	

== See also ==
- National Register of Historic Places listings in Jasper County, Missouri
