= Kent Hampton =

American politician

Member of the Missouri House of Representatives from the 150th district
- In office January 9, 2013 – January 4, 2015
- Preceded by: Jason Smith
- Succeeded by: Andrew McDaniel

Member of the Missouri House of Representatives from the 163rd district
- In office January 5, 2011 – January 9, 2013
- Preceded by: Tom Todd
- Succeeded by: Tom Flanigan

Personal details
- Born: February 3, 1948 (age 78) Malden, Missouri
- Party: Republican

Kent Hampton (born February 3, 1948) is an American politician who served in the Missouri House of Representatives from 2011 to 2015.
