= Sheridan Township =

Sheridan Township may refer to:

== Illinois ==
- Sheridan Township, Logan County, Illinois

== Iowa ==
- Sheridan Township, Carroll County, Iowa
- Sheridan Township, Cherokee County, Iowa
- Sheridan Township, Poweshiek County, Iowa
- Sheridan Township, Scott County, Iowa
- Sheridan Township, Sioux County, Iowa, in Sioux County, Iowa

== Kansas ==
- Sheridan Township, Cherokee County, Kansas
- Sheridan Township, Cowley County, Kansas
- Sheridan Township, Crawford County, Kansas
- Sheridan Township, Linn County, Kansas, in Linn County, Kansas
- Sheridan Township, Ottawa County, Kansas, in Ottawa County, Kansas
- Sheridan Township, Sheridan County, Kansas
- Sheridan Township, Washington County, Kansas, in Washington County, Kansas

== Michigan ==
- Sheridan Township, Mecosta County, Michigan
- Sheridan Township, Mason County, Michigan
- Sheridan Township, Huron County, Michigan
- Sheridan Township, Clare County, Michigan
- Sheridan Township, Calhoun County, Michigan
- Sheridan Charter Township, Michigan

== Minnesota ==
- Sheridan Township, Redwood County, Minnesota

== Missouri ==
- Sheridan Township, Dallas County, Missouri
- Sheridan Township, Daviess County, Missouri
- Sheridan Township, Jasper County, Missouri

== Nebraska ==
- Sheridan Township, Clay County, Nebraska
- Sheridan Township, Holt County, Nebraska
- Sheridan Township, Phelps County, Nebraska

== North Dakota ==
- Sheridan Township, LaMoure County, North Dakota, in LaMoure County, North Dakota

== Oklahoma ==
- Sheridan Township, Garfield County, Oklahoma
- Sheridan Township, Major County, Oklahoma

== South Dakota ==
- Sheridan Township, Codington County, South Dakota, in Codington County, South Dakota

== See also ==
- Sheridan (disambiguation)
