= Duval Township, Jasper County, Missouri =

Inactive township in the US state of Missouri

Coordinates: 37.307761°N 94.450156°W

Duval Township is an inactive township in Jasper County, in the U.S. state of Missouri.

Duval Township has the name of the proprietor of an old trading post within the township's borders.

Duval Creek flows through Duval Township.
