= Joplin Creek =

Stream in the U.S. state of Missouri

Coordinates: 37°06′39″N 94°31′18″W

Joplin Creek is a stream in Jasper County in the U.S. state of Missouri. It is a tributary of Turkey Creek.

The stream flows northwest through part of downtown Joplin to its confluence with Turkey Creek in the north part of the city.

Joplin Creek has the name of Rev. Harris G. Joplin, a pioneer settler.

== See also ==
- List of rivers of Missouri
