= Oakland Park =

Oakland Park is the name of several places in the United States:

- Oakland Park, Florida, a city
- Oakland Park, Missouri, a former village
- Albert Oakland Park, a park in Columbia, Missouri
- Oakland Park (Columbus, Georgia), a neighborhood
- Oakland Park (Jersey City, New Jersey), a former minor league baseball ballpark
