= Blackberry Creek =

Blackberry Creek may refer to:

- Blackberry Creek (Kentucky), USA; a creek
- Blackberry Creek (Missouri), USA; a creek

== See also ==
- Blackberry Run (Pennsylvania), USA; a creek
- Blackberry River (Connecticut), USA; a river
- Blackberry River Inn, Norfolk, Connecticut, USA; a NRHP-listed building
- Blackberry (disambiguation)
