= Sarcoxie Township, Jasper County, Missouri =

Inactive township in the US state of Missouri

Coordinates: 37.10°N 94.13°W

Sarcoxie Township is an inactive township in Jasper County, in the U.S. state of Missouri.

Sarcoxie Township takes its name from the community of Sarcoxie, Missouri.
