= Marion Township, Jasper County, Missouri =

Township in Jasper County, Missouri, U.S.

Coordinates: 37.205727°N 94.345453°W

Marion Township is an inactive township in Jasper County, in the U.S. state of Missouri.

Marion Township has the name of Francis Marion, an army officer during the American Revolutionary War.
