= Fred Grayson Sayre =

American painter

- Born: 1879; Medoc, Missouri, U.S.
- Died: December 31, 1938 (aged 59); Glendale, California, U.S.
- Occupations: Engraver, illustrator, painter
- Spouse: Ruth Sayre
- Children: 1 daughter

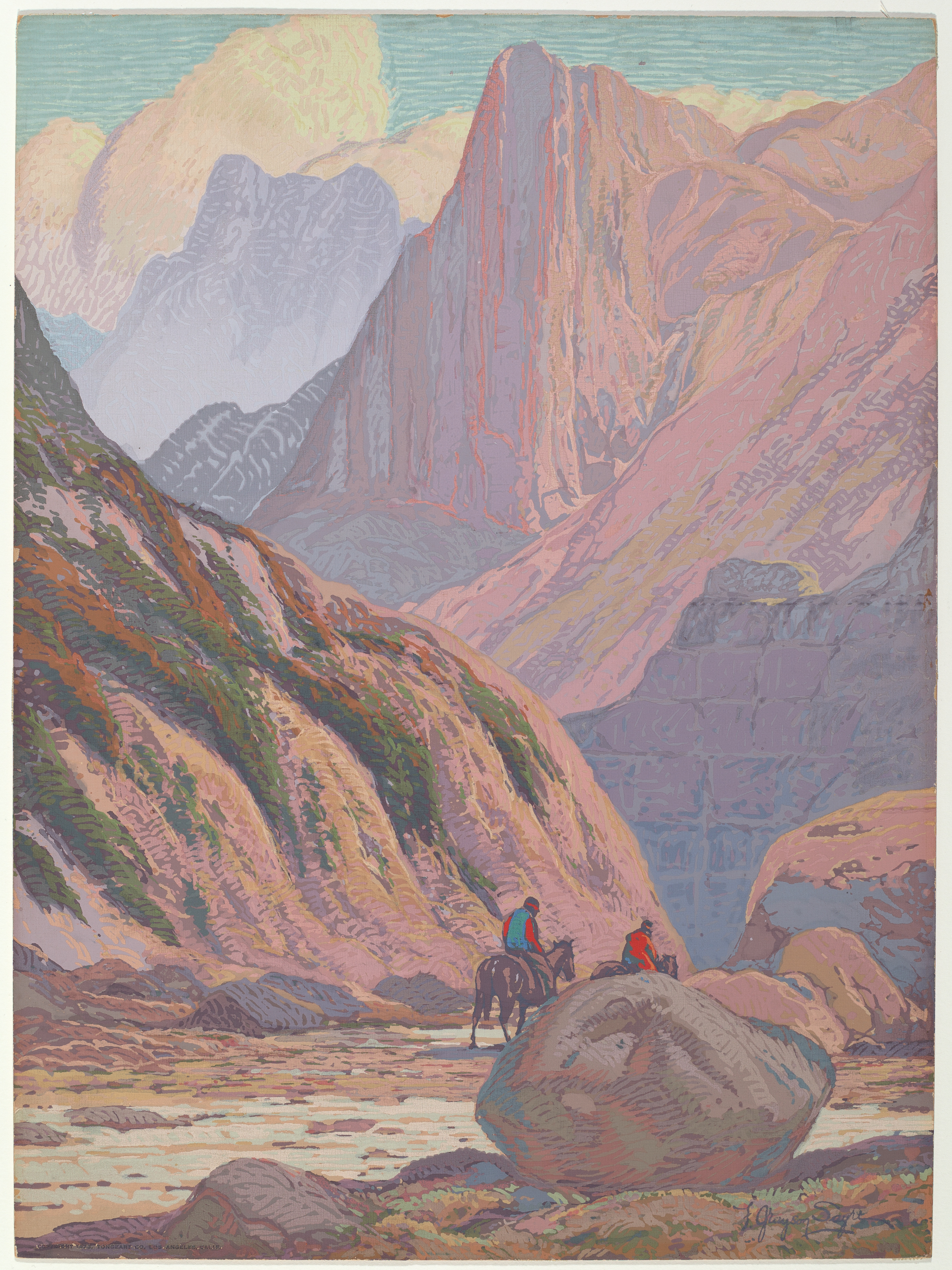
Untitled (Arizona Canyon). 1923.

Fred Grayson Sayre (1879 - December 31, 1938) was an American engraver, illustrator, and painter.

== Life ==
Sayre was born in 1879 in Medoc, Missouri. He briefly worked as a businessman.

Sayre began his artistic career as an engraver in Houston, Texas and Chicago, Illinois. He became a painter in Arizona, and he later moved to Glendale, California. He first exhibited his work in 1923 in San Francisco.

With his wife Ruth, he had a daughter, Barbara. He died on December 31, 1938, in Glendale, at age 59.
