= Cody Smith =

American politician

Member of the Missouri House of Representatives from the 163rd district
- In office January 2017 – January 2025
- Preceded by: Tom Flanigan
- Succeeded by: Cathy Jo Loy

Personal details
- Party: Republican
- Spouse: Jana
- Children: 1

Cody Smith is an American politician and businessman who was a Missouri House of Representatives member from the 163rd district. Elected in November 2016, he assumed office in January 2017.

== Early life and education ==
A native of Carthage, Missouri, Smith graduated from Carthage Senior High School. He studied business and commerce at Missouri Southern State University.

== Career ==
Outside of politics, Smith works as a real estate agent and owns a sanitization company. He is a member of the National Association of Realtors.

Smith was elected to the Missouri House of Representatives in November 2016 and assumed office in January 2017. He also serves as chair of the House Budget Committee and chair of the Missouri General Assembly Joint Committee on Legislative Research.

=== Political issues ===
==== Medicaid ====
After Missouri voters voted in favor of Medicaid expansion in a referendum, Smith led efforts to prevent the Missouri legislature from following the voters' wishes. Smith said, "Medicaid expansion is wrong for Missouri." He argued that Medicaid expansion would be fiscally irresponsible for Missouri, even though the federal government covers 90% of the cost for those covered under the expansion.

==== Libraries ====
In 2023, Smith, as chair of the House Budget Committee, proposed to eliminate state funding for public libraries in retaliation to a lawsuit challenging legislation to censor library collections and services as unconstitutional. Among the books that are being defended in the lawsuit to which Rep. Smith objects are classic novels, holocaust history books and human anatomy textbooks. The Senate Appropriations Committee restored funding to libraries in the budget without public comment.
