= McDonald Township, Jasper County, Missouri =

Township in Jasper County, Missouri, U.S.

Coordinates: 37.2023°N 94.1134°W

McDonald Township is an inactive township in Jasper County, in the U.S. state of Missouri.

McDonald Township has the name of the local McDonald family.
