= Bens Branch =

Stream in the US state of Missouri

Coordinates: 37.1753356°N 94.4549485°W

Bens Branch is a stream in Jasper County in the U.S. state of Missouri.

The identity of the namesake of Bens Branch has been lost.

== See also ==
- List of rivers of Missouri
