= Louise Secker =

American politician

Member-elect of the Missouri House of Representatives from the 161st district
- Assuming office January 6, 2027
- Succeeding: Lane Roberts

Personal details
- Party: Republican
- Website: Campaign website

Louise Secker is an American politician of the Missouri Republican Party who is the representative-elect for the 161st district in the Missouri House of Representatives. She was elected in the 2026 general election. She replaced Thomas Ross as the Republican candidate. This occurred after the primary election. She has had a career in real estate.
