= Blackberry Blossom (disambiguation) =

Blackberry Blossom is an album by American guitarist Norman Blake.

Blackberry Blossom may also refer to:

- "Blackberry Blossom" (tune), a traditional fiddle tune
- Flower of the blackberry

== See also ==
- Blackberry lily, a flower
- Blackberry (disambiguation)
