= Joplin, West Virginia =

- Unincorporated community
- Location within West Virginia and the United States Joplin (the United States)
- Coordinates: 38°20′35″N 81°40′49″W
- Country: United States
- State: West Virginia
- County: Kanawha
- Elevation: 837 ft (255 m)
- Time zone: UTC-5 (Eastern (EST))
  - Summer (DST): UTC-4 (EDT)
- GNIS ID: 1554831

Joplin is an unincorporated community in Kanawha County, West Virginia, United States. It is likely named after an early white settler in Kanawha County, James Jopling. In the early 19th century, Jopling purchased land alongside the creek later called Joplin Branch, a tributary of the Kanawha River. Many of Jopling's children and grandchildren lived along the creek near the family patriarch, and gave the community its name. James Jopling was described as "a man of powerful frame, and loved adventure. He was a noted trapper, hunter, and Indian fighter, and delighted in relating his narrow escapes and wonderful feats in woods life." Jopling also reportedly killed the last elk in the region, nearby on the Elk River.
