= Tuckahoe, Missouri =

Unincorporated community in Missouri, U.S.

Coordinates: 37°07′43″N 94°31′46″W

Tuckahoe is an unincorporated community in Jasper County, in the U.S. state of Missouri.

== History ==
Tuckahoe had its start in the 1870s as a mining community. A post office called Tuckahoe was established in 1891, and remained in operation until 1906.
