= Galena Township, Jasper County, Missouri =

Inactive township in the US state of Missouri

Coordinates: 37.107754°N 94.565309°W

Galena Township is an inactive township in Jasper County, in the U.S. state of Missouri.

Galena Township was named for the local galena mining industry.
