= Union Township, Jasper County, Missouri =

Township in Jasper County, Missouri, U.S.

Coordinates: 37.11°N 94.24°W

Union Township is an inactive township in Jasper County, in the U.S. state of Missouri.

Union Township was named for the fact it originated by the merging, or union, of territory ceded by neighboring townships.
