= Blackberry Township =

Blackberry Township may refer to:

- Blackberry Township, Illinois, United States
- Blackberry Township, Minnesota, United States

== See also ==
- Blueberry Township
- Blackberry (disambiguation)
