= Jopling =

Jopling is an English-language surname, sometimes spelled as Jobling. According to the Guild of One-Name Studies, the Jopling variant was primarily used in County Durham and Jobling in Northumberland, and in both cases the final "g" was sometimes dropped to distinguish different family branches, leading to the surnames Joplin and Joblin. Notable individuals with the surname include:

== Jopling ==
- Daisy Jopling (born 1969), British violinist
- James Jopling, founder of the Joplings department store
- Jay Jopling (born 1963), British art dealer
- Joe Jopling (born 1951), English footballer
- Louise Jopling (1843–1933), English painter
- Michael Jopling, Baron Jopling (born 1930), British politician
- William Jopling (1911–1997), British leprologist

== Jobling ==
- Andrew Jobling (born 1964), Australian footballer
- Curtis Jobling (born 1972), British illustrator
- James Wesley Jobling (1876–1961), American physician
- Joe Jobling (1906–1969), English footballer
- John Jobling (1937–2022), Australian politician
- Karen Jobling (born 1962), English cricketer
- Keith Jobling (1934–2020), English footballer
- Kevin Jobling (born 1968), English footballer
- Robert Jobling (1841–1923), British artist

== See also ==
- Christine Joblin, a French astrochemist
- Kate Joblin, a New Zealand local politician
- Joplin (surname)
