= Duval Creek =

Stream in the American state of Missouri

Duval Creek (also known as Little Spring River) is a stream in southwest Missouri, Its source is in southwest Barton County, about 8.5 miles (13.7 km) south-west of Lamar, and it flows south-south-west crossing under Missouri Route 126 and on entering Jasper County just to the east of Missouri Route Y. It continues on past the community of Cossville entering the North Fork of the Spring River just east of Missouri Route 43 in Jasper County, 9.5 miles (15.3 km) north of Webb City.

The stream headwaters arise at 37°25′01″N 94°23′54″W and the confluence with the North Fork Spring River is at 37°17′09″N 94°28′49″W.

The stream was named after a family of local settlers.

== See also ==
- List of rivers of Missouri
