= Medoc, Missouri =

Unincorporated community in Missouri, U.S.

Coordinates: 37°18′26″N 94°31′37″W

Medoc is an unincorporated community in Jasper County, in the U.S. state of Missouri.

== History ==
Medoc was platted in 1856, and named after the Medoc Indians. A post office called Medoc was established in 1854, and remained in operation until 1927.

== Notable people ==
- Fred Grayson Sayre (1879), Engraver, illustrator and painter.
