= Blackberry Farm =

Blackberry Farm may refer to:

- Blackberry Farm (books), a series of children's books
- Blackberry Farm (Tennessee), a farm and resort in Walland, Tennessee, USA
- Blackberry Farm (California), a farm and resort park n Monta Vista, Cupertino, California, USA

== See also ==
- Blackberry (disambiguation)
