= Common blackberry =

Common blackberry is a common name for several plants and may refer to:

- Rubus allegheniensis, native to eastern North America
- Rubus fruticosus, native to Europe

== See also ==
- Blackberry (disambiguation)
