= Madison Township, Jasper County, Missouri =

Inactive township in the US state of Missouri

Coordinates: 37.205°N 94.231°W

Madison Township is an inactive township in Jasper County, in the U.S. state of Missouri.

It was named after the former U.S. President James Madison.
