= Blackberry Hill (disambiguation) =

Blackberry Hill may refer to:

- Blackberry Hill, Marathon County, Wisconsin, USA
- Blackberry Hill Hospital, Fishponds, Bristol, England, UK; an NHS hospital
- Blackberry Hill (Tryon, North Carolina), USA; an NRHP-listed plantation mansion in Polk County

== See also ==
- Blackberry (disambiguation)
