= Brenden Kelley =

American politician

Member-elect of the Missouri House of Representatives from the 127th district
- Assuming office January 6, 2027
- Succeeding: Ann Kelley

Personal details
- Party: Republican

Brenden Kelley is an American politician of the Missouri Republican Party who is the representative-elect for the 127th district in the Missouri House of Representatives. He was elected in the 2026 general election. He is a commercial insurance underwriter and part-time real estate agent.
