= Joplin (surname) =

Joplin is an English surname. Notable people with the surname include:

- Frank Joplin (1894–1984), New Zealand cricketer
- Germaine Joplin (1903–1989), Australian geologist
- Janis Joplin (1943–1970), American singer-songwriter
- Josh Joplin, American singer-songwriter
- Larry Joplin (born 1946), American judge
- Scott Joplin (c. 1867–1917), American ragtime composer
- Stan Joplin (born 1957), American basketball coach
- Thomas Joplin (c. 1790–1847), English timber merchant and banker

Fictional characters

- Trudy Joplin, character in television series Miami Vice
- Piero Joplin, natural philosopher in the 2012 video game Dishonored

== See also ==
- Joplin (disambiguation)
- Jopling, related surname
