= Mineral Township, Jasper County, Missouri =

Township in Jasper County, Missouri, U.S.

Coordinates: 37.206°N 94.455°W

Mineral Township is an inactive township in Jasper County, in the U.S. state of Missouri.

Mineral Township was so named on account of local mining activities.
