= Jasper Township, Jasper County, Missouri =

Inactive township in the US state of Missouri

Coordinates: 37.311728°N 94.561075°W

Jasper Township is an inactive township in Jasper County, in the U.S. state of Missouri.

Jasper Township takes its name from the county in which it is located.
