= Lone Elm, Jasper County, Missouri =

Unincorporated community in Missouri, U.S.

Coordinates: 37°06′51″N 94°31′33″W

Lone Elm is an unincorporated community in Jasper County, in the U.S. state of Missouri.

The community was named for a large individual elm tree near the original town site. A variant name was "Turkey".
