= Lane Roberts =

American politician

Member of the Missouri House of Representatives from the 161st district
- Incumbent
- Assumed office 2019
- Preceded by: Bill White
- Succeeded by: Louise Secker (elect)

Personal details
- Born: 1947 or 1948 (age 78–79) Oceanside, California, U.S.
- Party: Republican
- Spouse: Judy
- Children: three
- Profession: Police Officer

Lane Roberts (born April 6, 1948) is an American politician. He is a member of the Missouri House of Representatives from the 161st District, serving since 2019. He is a member of the Republican Party. Prior to seeking elected office, Roberts served as Director of the Missouri Department of Public Safety, and as Chief of the Joplin Police Department.
