= Maple Grove, Missouri =

Unincorporated community in Missouri, U.S.

Coordinates: 37°15′13″N 94°07′33″W

Maple Grove is an unincorporated community in Jasper County, in the U.S. state of Missouri.

== History ==
A post office called Maple Grove was established in 1879, the name was changed to Maplegrove in 1894, and the post office closed in 1901. The community was named for a grove of maple trees near the original town site.
