= Sheridan Township, Jasper County, Missouri =

Township in Jasper County, Missouri, U.S.

Coordinates: 37.304°N 94.245°W

Sheridan Township is an inactive township in Jasper County, in the U.S. state of Missouri.

Sheridan Township has the name of Philip Sheridan (1831–1888), United States Army General.
