= Ann Kelley (politician) =

American politician and educator

Member of the Missouri House of Representatives from the 127th district
- Incumbent
- Assumed office January 2019
- Preceded by: Mike Kelley
- Succeeded by: Brenden Kelley (elect)

Personal details
- Born: Joplin, Missouri, U.S.
- Party: Republican
- Spouse: Mike Kelley
- Children: 1
- Education: Missouri Southern State University (BS); Grand Canyon University (MS)

Ann Kelley is an American Republican Party politician and educator serving as a member of the Missouri House of Representatives from the 127th district. Elected in November 2018, she assumed office in January 2019.

== Early life and education ==
Kelley was born in Joplin, Missouri and attended Liberal High School in Liberal, Missouri. She earned a Bachelor of Science degree in middle school science and English from Missouri Southern State University and a Master of Science in curriculum and middle school reading and writing from Grand Canyon University.

== Career ==
Kelley began her career as an English teacher in the Lamar School District. Kelley is a member of the National Rifle Association of America, Missouri Farm Bureau, and the Missouri State Teachers Association. She was also a board member of the Barton County Ambulance District. She was elected to the Missouri House of Representatives in November 2018 and assumed office in January 2019.

She has propagated conspiracy theories relating to election denial, raising doubts about Missouri election integrity.

Kelley gained national exposure when sponsoring an anti-LGBTQ bill, the Parental Rights in Education act on the 23rd February 2023. Kelley was challenged on the state House floor by fellow Republican Representatives Phil Christofanelli over the wording and application, eventually forcing Kelley to acknowledge that she did not know how it would be applied in reference to talking about Martha Washington being the wife of George Washington because of sexual orientation.

Kelley proposed a dress code for women in the Missouri House of Representatives, including covering the shoulders.

== Electoral history ==
=== State representative ===
Missouri House of Representatives Primary Election, August 7, 2018, District 127
Party	Candidate	Votes	%	±%
Republican	Ann Kelley	4,996	64.65%	
Republican	George Randall Heim	2,732	35.35%	
Total votes		7,728	100.00%	

Missouri House of Representatives Election, November 6, 2018, District 127
Party	Candidate	Votes	%	±%
Republican	Ann Kelley	12,276	82.89%	
Democratic	Teri Hanna	2,534	17.11%	
Total votes		14,810	100.00%	

Missouri House of Representatives Election, November 3, 2020, District 127
Party	Candidate	Votes	%	±%
Republican	Ann Kelley	16,881	100.00%	+17.11
Total votes		16,881	100.00%	

Missouri House of Representatives Election, November 8, 2022, District 127
Party	Candidate	Votes	%	±%
Republican	Ann Kelley	11,553	85.09%	−14.91
Democratic	Marvin Manring	2,024	14.91%	+14.91
Total votes		13,577	100.00%	
