= Justice Knight =

Justice Knight may refer to:

- Jesse Knight (judge) (1850–1905), associate justice of the Wyoming Supreme Court
- Samuel Knight (judge) (1731–1804), associate justice of the Vermont Supreme Court

== See also ==
- Knight of Justice, member of the first of the three classes the Sovereign Military Order of Malta
