= Knights (video game) =

1994 video game

- Developer(s): Kalle Marjola
- Publisher(s): PD/Freeware
- Platform(s): Commodore Amiga
- Release: 1994
- Genre(s): Arcade game
- Mode(s): Multiplayer

Knights is an arcade game released in 1994 as freeware by Kalle Marjola for the Commodore International Amiga home computer. In 2009, the author licensed the game and assets under the GNU General Public License, version 3 (GPLv3). Based on this release, the game was ported to C++ and is still updated by the game's community.

== Reception ==
In December 2003, print computer magazine Amiga Point of View reviewed Knights, giving five out of five points. Apart from the lack of a meaningful single player mode, two player gave a unique gameplay experience: "If any other convincing is necessary that this is one of those multiplayer games to play with friends while drinking beer, then consider this; how many other Amiga games let you bash through a door with an axe in a "Here's Johnny!" style just before you bury the axe in your opponent's skull?" The game was also listed on position 10 of a Top 20 Amiga Shareware game list, the Amiga Game Database noted the game for the fun provided.
