= Southwest Missouri Railroad Company =

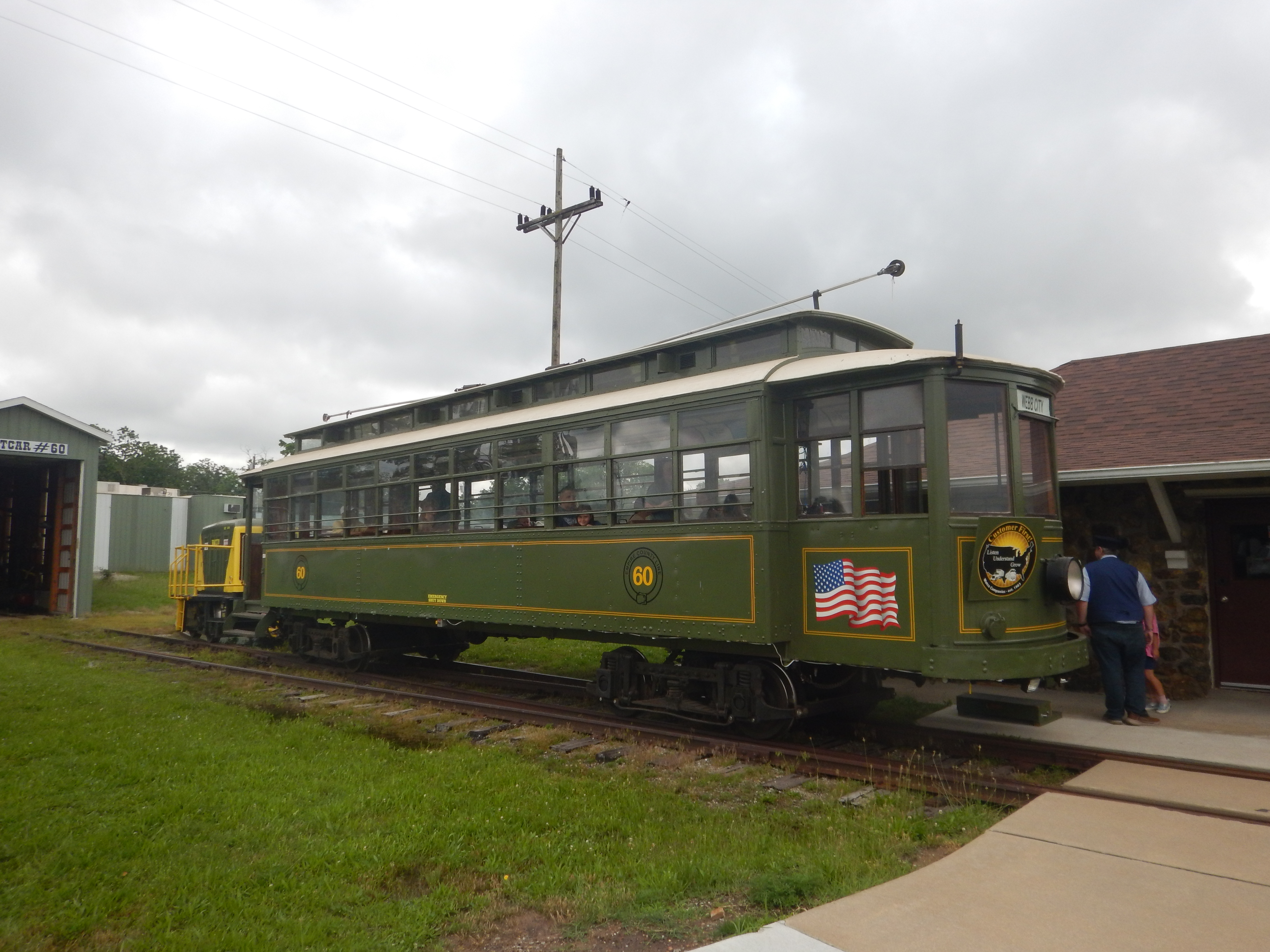

Overview
- Headquarters: Webb City, Missouri
- Locale: Missouri, Kansas & Oklahoma
- Dates of operation: 1889–1939

Technical
- Track gauge: 4 ft 8 1/2 in (1,435 mm)
- Length: 94 mi (151 km)

The Southwest Missouri Railroad Company was a rail carrier in the tri-state mining region of southwestern Missouri, southeastern Kansas and northeastern Oklahoma. An outgrowth of passenger streetcar lines with 94 miles of track, it became a smaller but full-fledged electric freight railway by the time it ceased operations effective May 31, 1939.

== History ==
The beginnings of the railroad were as the Twin City Railway Company, a horsecar line (elsewhere called a mule road) between Webb City, Missouri and Carterville, Missouri organized by A.H. Rogers in 1889. That in turn was absorbed in 1892 by the Southwest Missouri Electric Railway Company, of which Rogers was named President. That electrified line was in operation by 1893 between the mining camps at Webb City, where the railroad was headquartered, and Joplin, Missouri. The line added Carterville and Prosperity, Missouri, and also expanded its road by purchase of other lines, namely the Joplin & Galena Electric Railway and the Jasper County Electric Railway, in 1896.

The year 1906 was pivotal to the company. It continued to expand, extending its line to Galena, Kansas, and having a subsidiary, the Webb City Northern Electric Railroad Company, build from Webb City to Oronogo, Neck City, Purcell, and Alba, all in Missouri. However, it had come to understand that the lightly-built trackage which was appropriate when the railway was founded was becoming obsolete in the face of the demands of the booming Tri-state mining area. Thus the line began not only rebuilding trackage in a more substantial manner, and double-tracking in places, but also deciding to become a full-fledged common-carrier railroad rather than just a streetcar line. So in that year, the company was rechartered as the Southwest Missouri Railroad Company, taking over the assets of both the Southwest Missouri Electric Railway Company and the Webb City Northern Electric Railroad Company. Nevertheless, its focus remained on passenger service, believing other railways adequately covered the freight needs of the area.

At its maximum, the line had about 94 miles of track. Carthage, Missouri was added from Webb City; and, as the center of the mining activity shifted westward toward Oklahoma, the railroad put in a branch to Picher, Oklahoma. But competition from vehicles on the advancing hard-surface roads took away passengers, and by 1924 it was primarily a freight carrier, with its mainline then running from Carthage, Missouri through southern Kansas to Picher, Oklahoma. The railway had a GE 50-ton electric locomotive in use by that point. Line abandonments continued to occur, and by 1939 the line, in receivership (as it had been for some years), was down to a 5.556-mile mainline from Baxter Springs, Kansas to Picher used for regular freight service, and 4.17 miles of sidetracks. That year, sale was made of substantially all the assets of the company to the Northeast Oklahoma Railroad, giving that line three additional interchange points, being with the St. Louis-San Francisco Railway at Hockerville, Oklahoma, and with both the Kansas, Oklahoma and Gulf Railway and the Kansas City Southern Railway at Baxter Springs. The Southwest Missouri Railroad Company ceased all rail operations by May 31, 1939.

== Legacy ==
The railroad’s depot in Webb City is still standing, and trolley #60 is preserved and operated in King Jack Park, Webb City, Missouri.
