= Galesburg, Jasper County, Missouri =

Unincorporated community in the US state of Missouri

Coordinates: 37°16′10″N 94°30′56″W

Galesburg is an unincorporated community in northwest Jasper County in southwest Missouri, United States. The community is located on the south bank of the Spring River, approximately twelve miles north of Joplin.

== History ==
Galesburg was laid out in 1869. A post office called Galesburg was established in 1869, and remained in operation until 1907.
