= Waco, Missouri =

- City
- Location of Waco, Missouri
- Coordinates: 37°14′49″N 94°36′01″W
- Country: United States
- State: Missouri
- County: Jasper

Area
  - Total: 0.25 sq mi (0.66 km^{2})
  - Land: 0.25 sq mi (0.66 km^{2})
  - Water: 0 sq mi (0.00 km^{2})
- Elevation: 902 ft (275 m)

Population (2020)
  - Total: 72
  - Density: 280.6/sq mi (108.35/km^{2})
- Time zone: UTC-6 (Central (CST))
  - Summer (DST): UTC-5 (CDT)
- ZIP code: 64869
- Area code: 417
- FIPS code: 29-76444
- GNIS feature ID: 2397158

Waco (/ˈweɪkoʊ/ WAY-koh) is a city in Jasper County, Missouri, United States. The population was 72 at the 2020 census. It is part of the Joplin, Missouri Metropolitan Statistical Area.

== History ==
Waco was laid out in 1875. The city's name most likely is a transfer from Waco, Texas. A post office called Waco has been in operation since 1878. This post office has been closed since the early 2000s.

== Geography ==
According to the United States Census Bureau, the city has a total area of 0.26 square miles (0.67 km^{2}), all land.

== Demographics ==
Historical population
Census	Pop.	Note	%±
1920	368		—
1930	289		−21.5%
1940	237		−18.0%
1950	177		−25.3%
1960	143		−19.2%
1970	108		−24.5%
1980	129		19.4%
1990	86		−33.3%
2000	86		0.0%
2010	87		1.2%
2020	72		−17.2%
U.S. Decennial Census

=== 2010 census ===
As of the census of 2010, there were 87 people, 34 households, and 24 families living in the city. The population density was 334.6 inhabitants per square mile (129.2/km^{2}). There were 41 housing units at an average density of 157.7 per square mile (60.9/km^{2}). The racial makeup of the city was 92.0% White and 8.0% from two or more races.

There were 34 households, of which 35.3% had children under the age of 18 living with them, 64.7% were married couples living together, 5.9% had a female householder with no husband present, and 29.4% were non-families. 20.6% of all households were made up of individuals, and 11.8% had someone living alone who was 65 years of age or older. The average household size was 2.56 and the average family size was 3.08.

The median age in the city was 46.8 years. 26.4% of residents were under the age of 18; 2.2% were between the ages of 18 and 24; 18.3% were from 25 to 44; 36.7% were from 45 to 64; and 16.1% were 65 years of age or older. The gender makeup of the city was 56.3% male and 43.7% female.

=== 2000 census ===
As of the census of 2000, there were 86 people, 37 households, and 27 families living in the town. The population density was 336.0 inhabitants per square mile (129.7/km^{2}). There were 41 housing units at an average density of 160.2 per square mile (61.9/km^{2}). The racial makeup of the town was 98.84% White and 1.16% Native American.

There were 37 households, out of which 29.7% had children under the age of 18 living with them, 59.5% were married couples living together, 13.5% had a female householder with no husband present, and 27.0% were non-families. 24.3% of all households were made up of individuals, and 8.1% had someone living alone who was 65 years of age or older. The average household size was 2.32 and the average family size was 2.78.

In the town the population was spread out, with 22.1% under the age of 18, 10.5% from 18 to 24, 27.9% from 25 to 44, 26.7% from 45 to 64, and 12.8% who were 65 years of age or older. The median age was 40 years. For every 100 females, there were 100.0 males. For every 100 females age 18 and over, there were 103.0 males.

The median income for a household in the town was $31,250, and the median income for a family was $34,375. Males had a median income of $27,500 versus $19,583 for females. The per capita income for the town was $13,071. There were 3.4% of families and 7.3% of the population living below the poverty line, including no under eighteens and none of those over 64.

== Education ==
The school district is Carl Junction R-I School District.
