= Charlie Davis (politician) =

American politician

Member of the Missouri House of Representatives from the 162nd district
- In office 2011–2019
- Succeeded by: Bob Bromley

Personal details
- Born: July 18, 1965 (age 61) Fayetteville, North Carolina, U.S.
- Party: Republican
- Spouse: Laura
- Children: 3
- Profession: Businessman

Military service
- Allegiance: United States
- Branch/service: United States Navy

Charlie Davis (born July 18, 1965) is an American politician. He was a member of the Missouri House of Representatives from 2011 to 2019. He is a member of the Republican Party.
