= Blackberry, Virginia =

Unincorporated community in Virginia, US

Blackberry
- unincorporated community
- Location within Virginia Location within the United States
- Coordinates: 37°51′32.4″N 76°16′53.7″W
- Country: United States
- State: Virginia
- County: Northumberland

Blackberry is an unincorporated community in Northumberland County, in the U.S. state of Virginia.
