= Oakland Park, Missouri =

Former village in Missouri, U.S.

Oakland Park
- Unincorporated community
- Location within Missouri
- Coordinates: 37.1128374°N 94.4760586°W
- Country: United States
- State: Missouri
- County: Jasper
- Elevation: 1,040 ft (317 m)
- USGS Feature ID: 723672

Oakland Park is a former village in Jasper County, Missouri, United States. It was located on U.S. Route 71 (Rangeline Road- now Business I-49) in the Joplin area. Oakland Park was incorporated in 195; in 1996, it merged with nearby Webb City.

== Demographics ==
Historical population
Census	Pop.	Note	%±
1960	139		—
1970	156		12.2%
1980	143		−8.3%
Missouri Census Data Center
