= Belleville, Missouri =

Unincorporated community in Missouri, U.S.

Coordinates: 37°07′28″N 94°35′26″W

Belleville is an unincorporated community in Jasper County, Missouri, United States.

== History ==
Belleville was named after a mining official. Variant names were "Bellville" and "Zincite". A post office called Zincite was established in 1885, and remained in operation until 1918.
