= Preston, Jasper County, Missouri =

Unincorporated community in Jasper County, Missouri, United States

Coordinates: 37°16′45″N 94°23′21″W

Preston is an unincorporated community in Jasper County, Missouri, United States.

== History ==
A post office called Preston was established in 1860, and remained in operation until 1880. The community has the name of an original owner of the site.
