= Blackberry Castle =

Private residence in Portland, Oregon, U.S.

- Interactive map of the Blackberry Castle area

General information
- Location: Portland, Oregon, United States
- Coordinates: 45°35′11.4″N 122°49′20.9″W
- Completed: 2015
- Owner: Mia Malkova and Eli Tucker

Technical details
- Size: 13,000 square feet

Blackberry Castle is a private residence resembling a castle, located in Portland, Oregon, in the United States. Construction of the 13,000-square-foot, French-style house took three years, and was completed in 2015. Features include a ceiling fresco, climbing wall, indoor theater, and the largest ceiling clock dial in Oregon, which is installed above a two-story library.

The property was put on the market for $7,175,000 in March 2015. Mia Malkova, an adult-film actress, and Eli Tucker, a content producer, along with a silent partner, paid $3.9 million to make the gated and guarded estate a home film studio. According to public records, the new owners closed the deal December 18, 2020, and took possession of the castle on January 9, 2021.

In 2023, the building was put up for auction and sold for $2 million.

== See also ==
- Canterbury Castle (Portland, Oregon)
