= Mike Kelley (Missouri politician) =

American politician (born 1975)

Member of the Missouri House of Representatives from the 127 district
- In office January 3, 2011 – January 3, 2019
- Preceded by: Ed Emery
- Succeeded by: Ann Kelley

Personal details
- Born: March 27, 1975 (age 51) Lamar, Missouri, U.S.
- Party: Republican
- Children: 1

Mike Kelley (born March 27, 1975) is an American politician who served as a member of the Missouri House of Representatives for the 127th district from 2011 to 2019. He was replaced by his wife, Ann Kelley, on January 3, 2019, due to term limits.

As member of the Republican Party, Mike Kelley was elected into the position in 2011, and left office in 2019 after 8 years in the position due to Missouri term limits.

== Early life ==
A native of Lamar, Missouri, Kelley attended Lamar High School.

== Career ==
Kelley became a general manager at a McDonald's in Lamar in 1995 and held that position until he took office. He then went to work as Chief of Staff to Missouri State Senator Bill White and was appointed by Governor Eric Greitens to serve as one of the commissioners of Missouri Commission for the Deaf & Hard of Hearing. He is currently the Assistant Deputy Director of the Missouri Department of Revenue, Taxation Division.

=== Missouri House of Representatives ===
Kelley was elected to the Missouri House of Representatives in 2010, replacing term-limited incumbent Ed Emery.

==== Committee assignments ====
In 2013, Kelley became the vice chair of the Downsizing State Government Committee. In 2015, he became the vice chair of the House Labor and Industrial Relations Committee and House Government Efficiency Committee. Kelley also served as chair of the Special Committee for Tax Policy for Working Families.

Kelley was re-elected in 2010, 2012, 2014, and 2016.

== Personal life ==
Mike Kelley is married to Ann Kelley, and has one child, Brenden Kelley. Kelley is a Methodist and currently resides in Lamar, Missouri.

=== Memberships ===
Mike Kelley is a member of the National Rifle Association of America, The Oakton Methodist Church, Rotary Club of Lamar, the Lockwood Chamber of Commerce, the Greenfield Chamber of Commerce, the Barton Country Chamber of Commerce, and an Assistant Area Representative at the ASSE International Student Exchange Programs. He was a former President of the Rotary Club of Lamar, and a former member of the Pleasant Hope Chamber of Commerce.

=== Awards ===
Kelley has been awarded the Champion Award by the Saint Louis Regional Chapter in 2016. He has been awarded the Friend of Agriculture, Friend of Manufacturing, ACU Conservative, and Administration of Justice and Liberty Standard Awards.
