= Carterville, Missouri =

- City
- City of Carterville
- Location of Carterville, Missouri
- Coordinates: 37°08′48″N 94°26′20″W
- Country: United States
- State: Missouri
- County: Jasper

Government
  - Mayor: Alan Griffin

Area
  - Total: 2.61 sq mi (6.75 km^{2})
  - Land: 2.61 sq mi (6.75 km^{2})
  - Water: 0 sq mi (0.00 km^{2})
- Elevation: 1,001 ft (305 m)

Population (2020)
  - Total: 1,855
  - Density: 711.6/sq mi (274.76/km^{2})
- Time zone: UTC-6 (Central (CST))
  - Summer (DST): UTC-5 (CDT)
- ZIP code: 64835
- Area code: 417
- FIPS code: 29-11638
- GNIS feature ID: 2393758

Carterville is a city in Jasper County, Missouri, United States. The population was 1,855 at the 2020 census. It is part of the Joplin, Missouri Metropolitan Statistical Area.

== History ==
While one James Carter settled in Jasper County in 1841, the land on which Carterville was built was originally owned by his son, James Gilbert Leroy Carter, who created a farm in the 1860’s. The town considers itself founded in 1875, when a post office called Carterville opened that year. However, the settlement was not officially incorporated until 1882. Early Carterville was little more than a lead-mining camp, one of many in the tri-state mining district in southwestern Missouri, southeastern Kansas and northwestern Oklahoma. It nevertheless thrived, and at one time had a population of over 12,000 residents, making it larger than nearby Webb City.

When interurban transportation came to the mining district in 1889, it was in the form of a horsecar line (other sources say a mule road) between Webb City and Carterville. That operation was absorbed in 1892 by the Southwest Missouri Electric Railway Company, later the Southwest Missouri Railroad Company, and by 1894 an electrified streetcar line linked Carterville to Webb City and Joplin in one direction, and Prosperity in the other. Two additional rail lines, that of the Missouri Pacific Railway and the Kansas City, Fort Scott and Memphis Railway, ran down the west border of Carterville.

The town began its decline in size after World War I, when the mining industry began to dry up.

== Geography ==
Carterville's main street is the former U.S. Route 66.

According to the United States Census Bureau, the city has a total area of 2.60 square miles (6.73 km^{2}), all land.

== Demographics ==
Historical population
Census	Pop.	Note	%±
1880	483		—
1890	2,884		497.1%
1900	4,445		54.1%
1910	4,539		2.1%
1920	2,434		−46.4%
1930	1,600		−34.3%
1940	1,582		−1.1%
1950	1,552		−1.9%
1960	1,445		−6.9%
1970	1,716		18.8%
1980	1,973		15.0%
1990	2,013		2.0%
2000	1,850		−8.1%
2010	1,891		2.2%
2020	1,855		−1.9%
U.S. Decennial Census

=== 2020 census ===
As of the 2020 census, Carterville had a population of 1,855. The median age was 36.8 years. 26.7% of residents were under the age of 18 and 16.8% of residents were 65 years of age or older. For every 100 females there were 98.2 males, and for every 100 females age 18 and over there were 91.5 males age 18 and over.

94.0% of residents lived in urban areas, while 6.0% lived in rural areas.

There were 725 households in Carterville, of which 35.3% had children under the age of 18 living in them. Of all households, 43.4% were married-couple households, 20.0% were households with a male householder and no spouse or partner present, and 26.3% were households with a female householder and no spouse or partner present. About 26.4% of all households were made up of individuals and 11.6% had someone living alone who was 65 years of age or older.

There were 830 housing units, of which 12.7% were vacant. The homeowner vacancy rate was 2.7% and the rental vacancy rate was 9.4%.

Racial composition as of the 2020 census
Race	Number	Percent
White	1,599	86.2%
Black or African American	20	1.1%
American Indian and Alaska Native	29	1.6%
Asian	12	0.6%
Native Hawaiian and Other Pacific Islander	3	0.2%
Some other race	29	1.6%
Two or more races	163	8.8%
Hispanic or Latino (of any race)	76	4.1%

=== 2010 census ===
As of the census of 2010, there were 1,891 people, 712 households, and 511 families living in the city. The population density was 727.3 inhabitants per square mile (280.8/km^{2}). There were 800 housing units at an average density of 307.7 per square mile (118.8/km^{2}). The racial makeup of the city was 94.2% White, 0.4% African American, 0.8% Native American, 0.4% Asian, 2.1% from other races, and 2.0% from two or more races. Hispanic or Latino of any race were 3.9% of the population.

There were 712 households, of which 38.1% had children under the age of 18 living with them, 50.4% were married couples living together, 15.9% had a female householder with no husband present, 5.5% had a male householder with no wife present, and 28.2% were non-families. 22.3% of all households were made up of individuals, and 8.8% had someone living alone who was 65 years of age or older. The average household size was 2.66 and the average family size was 3.08.

The median age in the city was 34.5 years. 27.7% of residents were under the age of 18; 9.1% were between the ages of 18 and 24; 27% were from 25 to 44; 24.7% were from 45 to 64; and 11.4% were 65 years of age or older. The gender makeup of the city was 48.9% male and 51.1% female.

=== 2000 census ===
As of the census of 2000, there were 1,850 people, 702 households, and 499 families living in the city. The population density was 709.4 inhabitants per square mile (273.9/km^{2}). There were 792 housing units at an average density of 303.7 per square mile (117.3/km^{2}). The racial makeup of the city was 96.70% White, 0.16% African American, 0.59% Native American, 0.11% Asian, 0.16% Pacific Islander, 0.11% from other races, and 2.16% from two or more races. Hispanic or Latino of any race were 0.92% of the population.

There were 702 households, out of which 34.9% had children under the age of 18 living with them, 53.8% were married couples living together, 11.5% had a female householder with no husband present, and 28.9% were non-families. 24.6% of all households were made up of individuals, and 9.1% had someone living alone who was 65 years of age or older. The average household size was 2.64 and the average family size was 3.13.

In the city the population was spread out, with 28.7% under the age of 18, 8.9% from 18 to 24, 29.5% from 25 to 44, 22.7% from 45 to 64, and 10.2% who were 65 years of age or older. The median age was 34 years. For every 100 females, there were 97.2 males. For every 100 females age 18 and over, there were 98.0 males.

The median income for a household in the city was $29,595, and the median income for a family was $34,539. Males had a median income of $26,581 versus $18,276 for females. The per capita income for the city was $12,924. About 10.1% of families and 13.5% of the population were below the poverty line, including 18.1% of those under age 18 and 13.8% of those age 65 or over.

== Education ==
Carterville is in the Webb City R-VII School District. Webb City High School is the district's comprehensive high school.

== Gallery ==
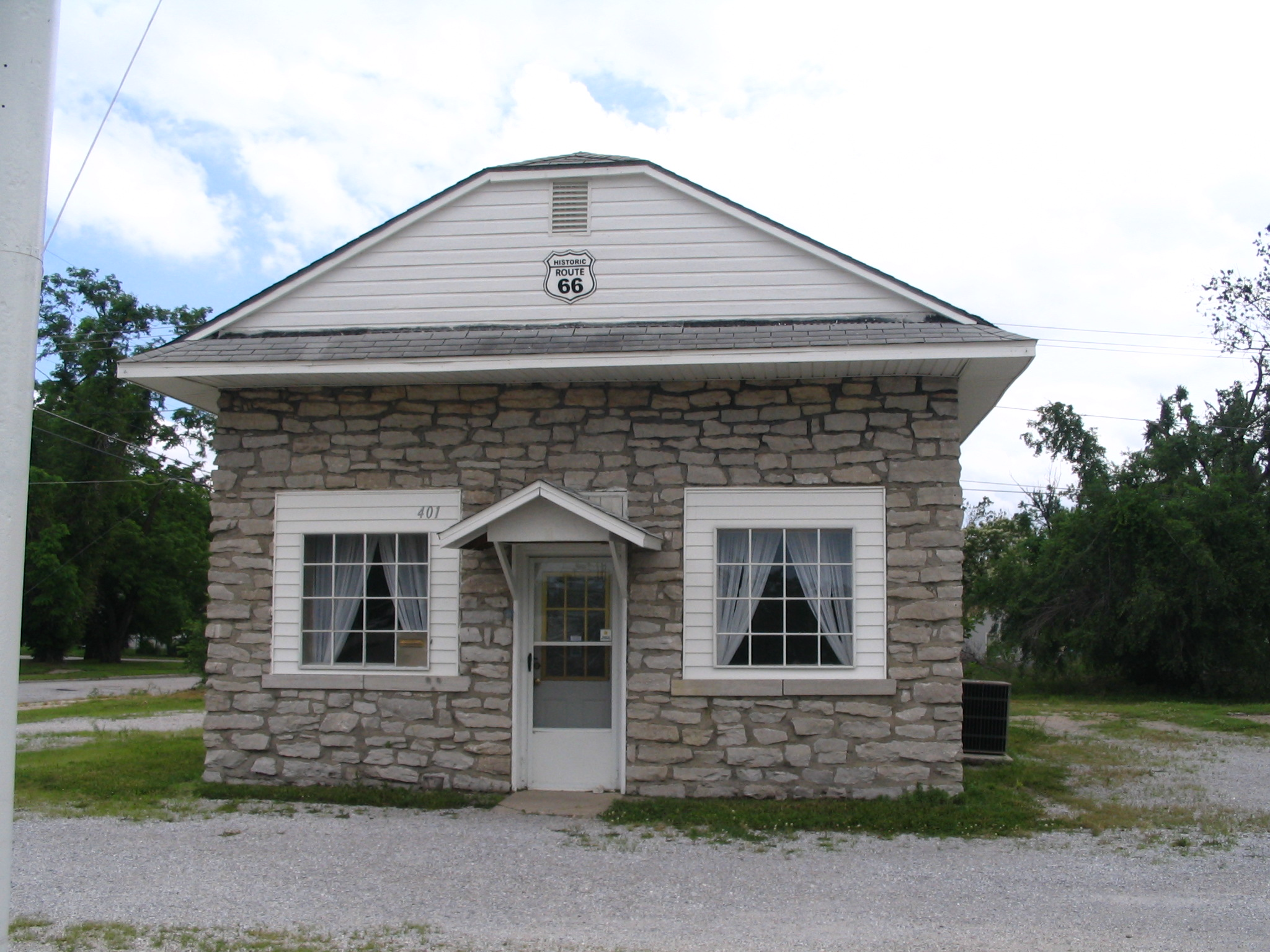
Historic Old Rock filling station on Route 66 in Carterville, MO

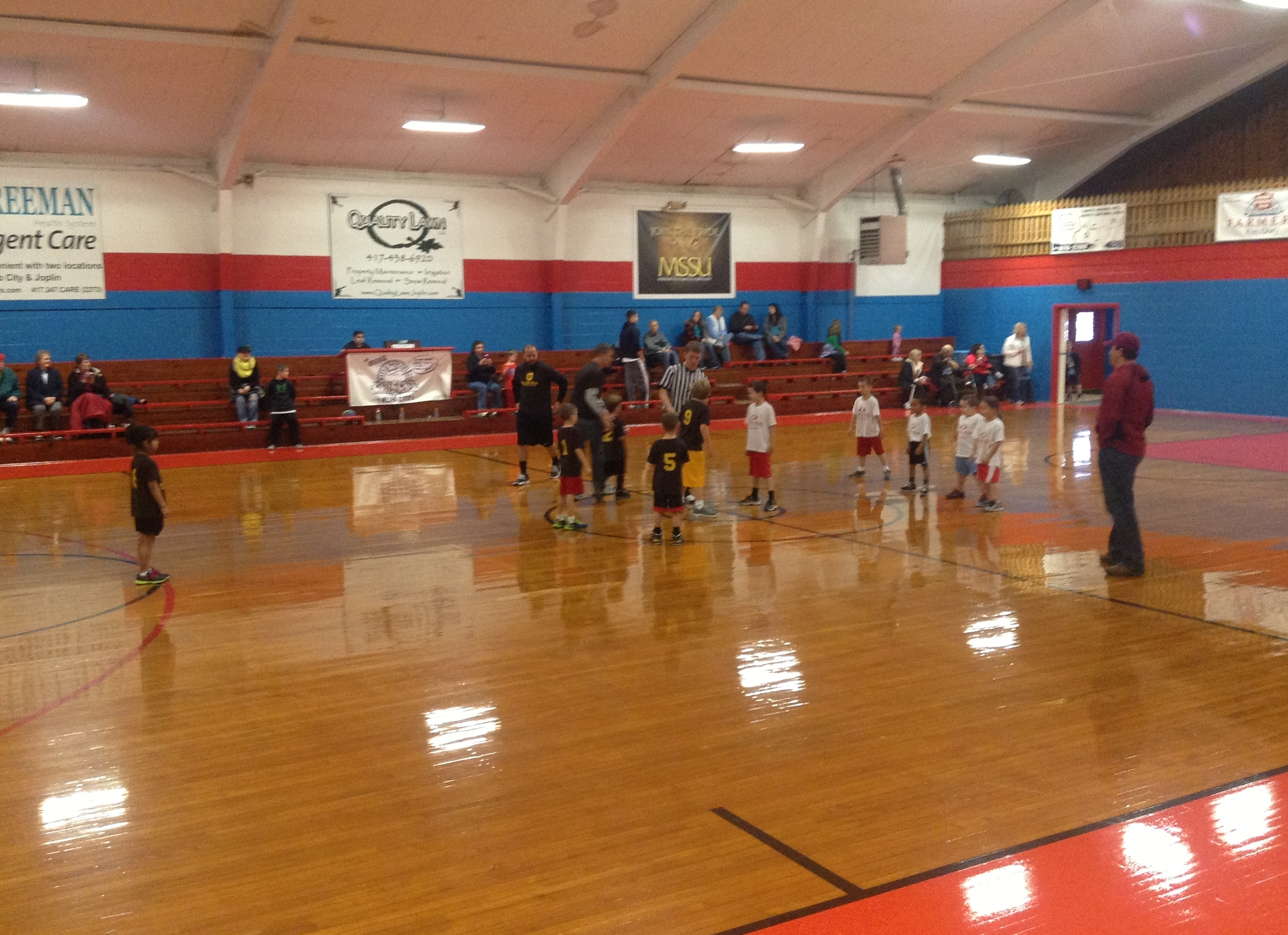
Inside view of Carterville Gymnasium
