= Knights, Missouri =

Unincorporated community in the US state of Missouri

Coordinates: 37°08′25″N 94°15′05″W

Knights (also known as Knight) is an unincorporated community in Jasper County, in the U.S. state of Missouri.

== History ==
A post office called Knight was established in 1881, and remained in operation until 1888. The community was named after the proprietor of a local trading post.
