= Joplin Branch =

Stream in West Virginia, U.S.

Coordinates: 38°21′56″N 81°40′19″W

Joplin Branch is a stream in the U.S. state of West Virginia.

Joplin Branch most likely derives its name from James Jopling, a pioneer settler.

== See also ==
- List of rivers of West Virginia
