= Andrew Jobling =

Australian rules footballer

Personal information
- Full name: Andrew Jobling
- Born: 20 September 1964 (age 62)
- Original team: Beaumaris
- Height: 183 cm (6 ft 0 in)
- Weight: 74 kg (163 lb)

Playing career^{1}
Years	Club	Games (Goals)
1983, 1985–1987	St Kilda	24 (5)
- ^{1} Playing statistics correct to the end of 1987.

Andrew Jobling (born 20 September 1964) is a former Australian rules footballer who played for the St Kilda Football Club in the Victorian Football League (VFL).

Jobling has been a personal trainer and café owner and is now an author and public speaker. He has written nine books that have sold over 200,000 copies.

== Bibliography ==
- Accidental Author
- Dance Until It Rains
- Eat Chocolate, Drink Alcohol and Be Lean and Healthy
- From Brilliant and Broke to Inspired and Abundant
- Kicking On
- The Wellness Puzzle
- Simply Strength
- Joia
- Powerful Beyond Measure
