= Sheridan Township, Phelps County, Nebraska =

Sheridan Township
- Township
- Location in Phelps County
- Coordinates: 40°29′23″N 099°21′16″W
- Country: United States
- State: Nebraska
- County: Phelps

Area
  - Total: 33.93 sq mi (87.89 km^{2})
  - Land: 33.93 sq mi (87.89 km^{2})
  - Water: 0 sq mi (0 km^{2}) 0%
- Elevation: 2,316 ft (706 m)

Population (2000)
  - Total: 263
  - Density: 7.8/sq mi (3/km^{2})
- GNIS feature ID: 0838245

Sheridan Township is one of fourteen townships in Phelps County, Nebraska, United States. The population was 263 at the 2000 census. A 2006 estimate placed the township's population at 264.
