= Joplin Township, Jasper County, Missouri =

Inactive township in the US state of Missouri

Coordinates: 37.10528°N 94.45812°W

Joplin Township is an inactive township in Jasper County, in the U.S. state of Missouri.

Joplin Township takes its name from the city of Joplin.
