= Tom Flanigan (politician) =

American politician

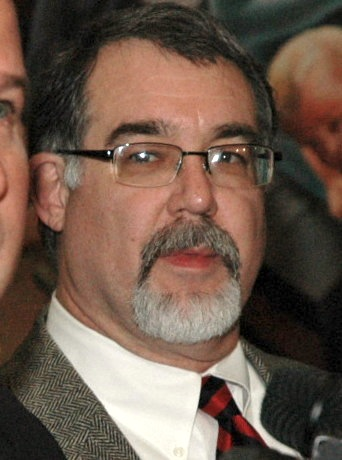

Member of the Missouri House of Representatives from the 163rd district
- In office 2009–2017
- Succeeded by: Cody Smith

Personal details
- Born: April 27, 1953 (age 73) Carthage, Missouri
- Party: Republican
- Profession: Insurance agent

Tom Flanigan (born April 27, 1953) is an American politician. He was a member of the Missouri House of Representatives from 2009 to 2017. He is a member of the Republican Party.
