= Joplin, Missouri =

Joplin
- City
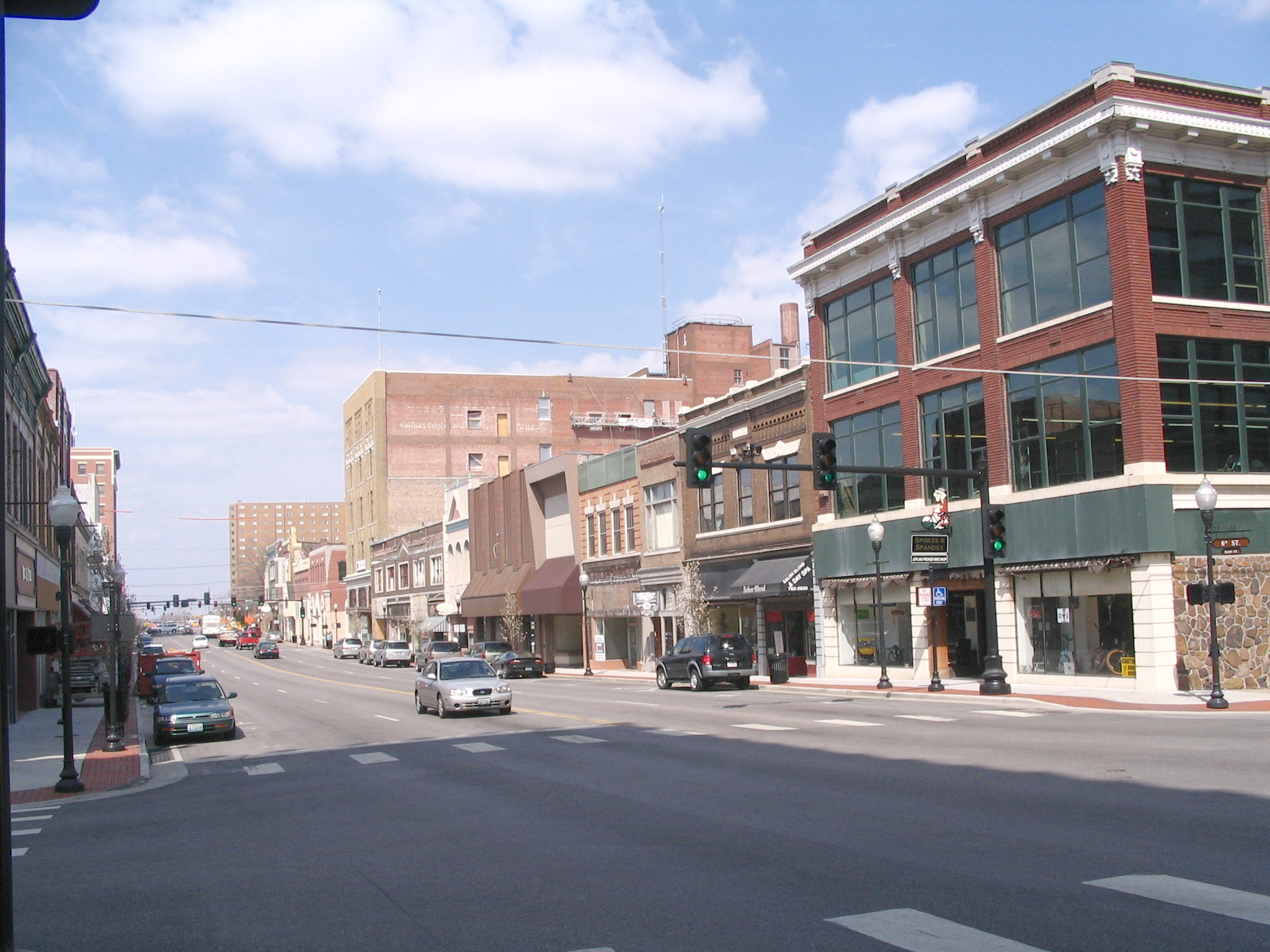
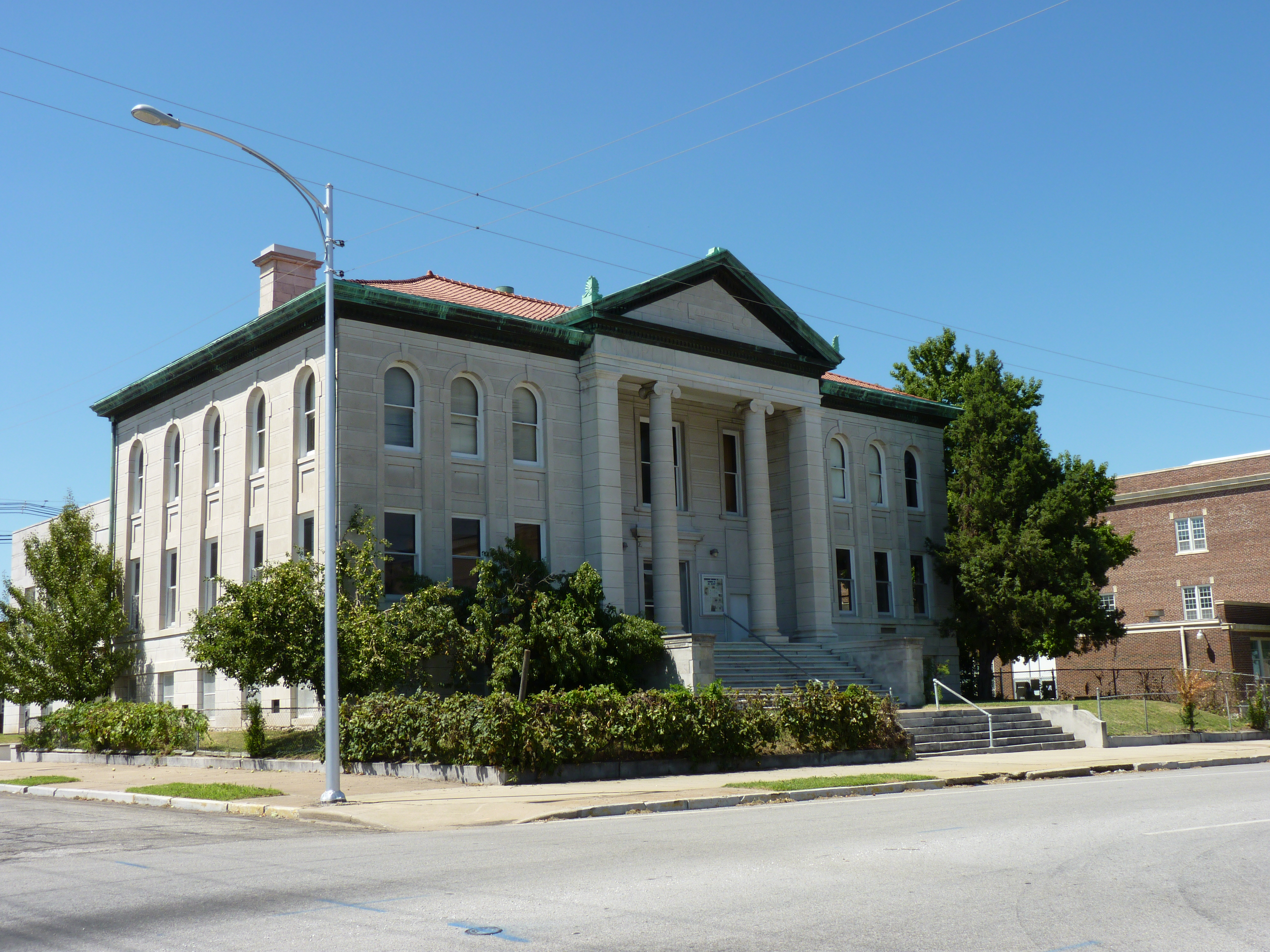
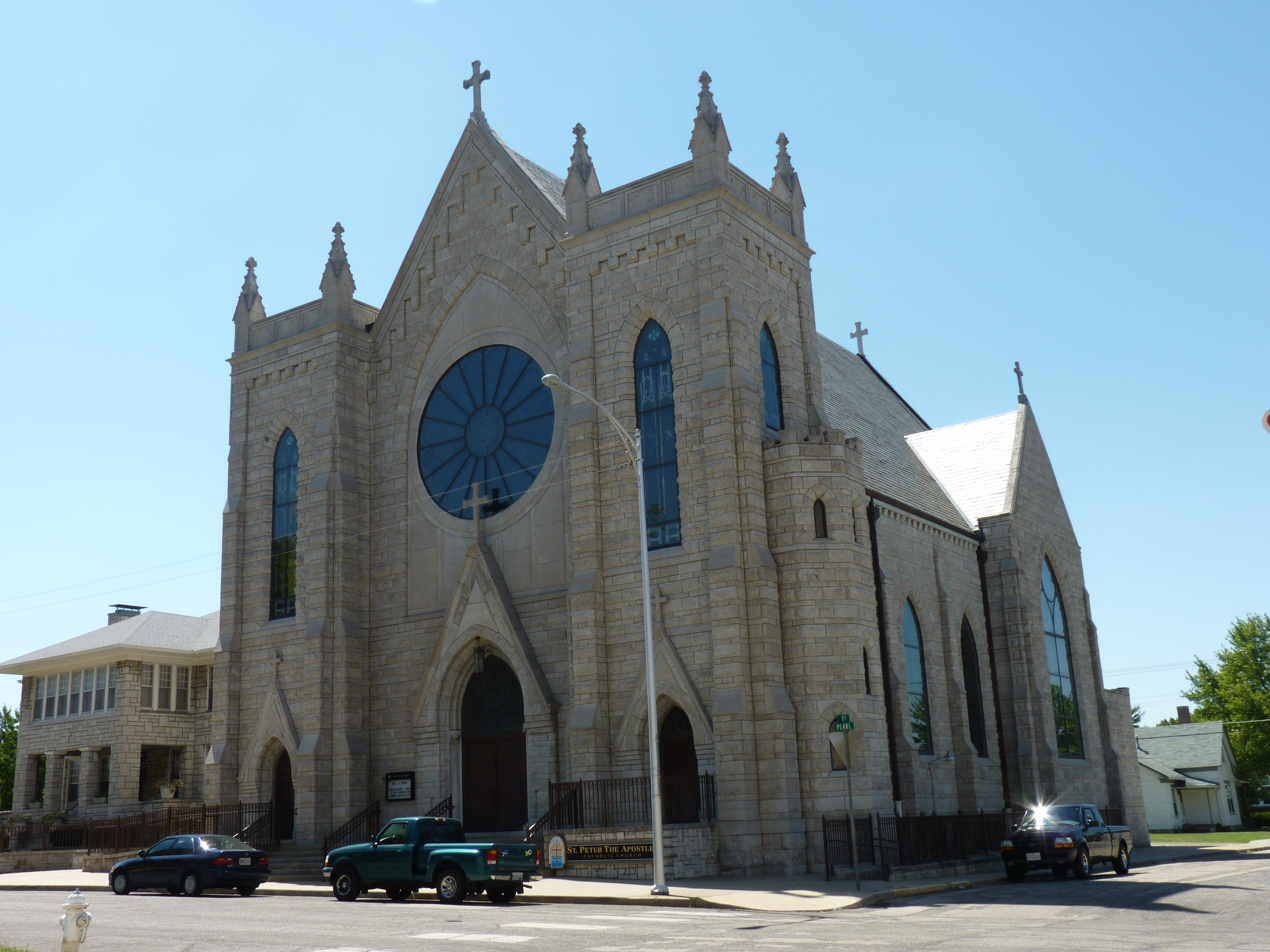
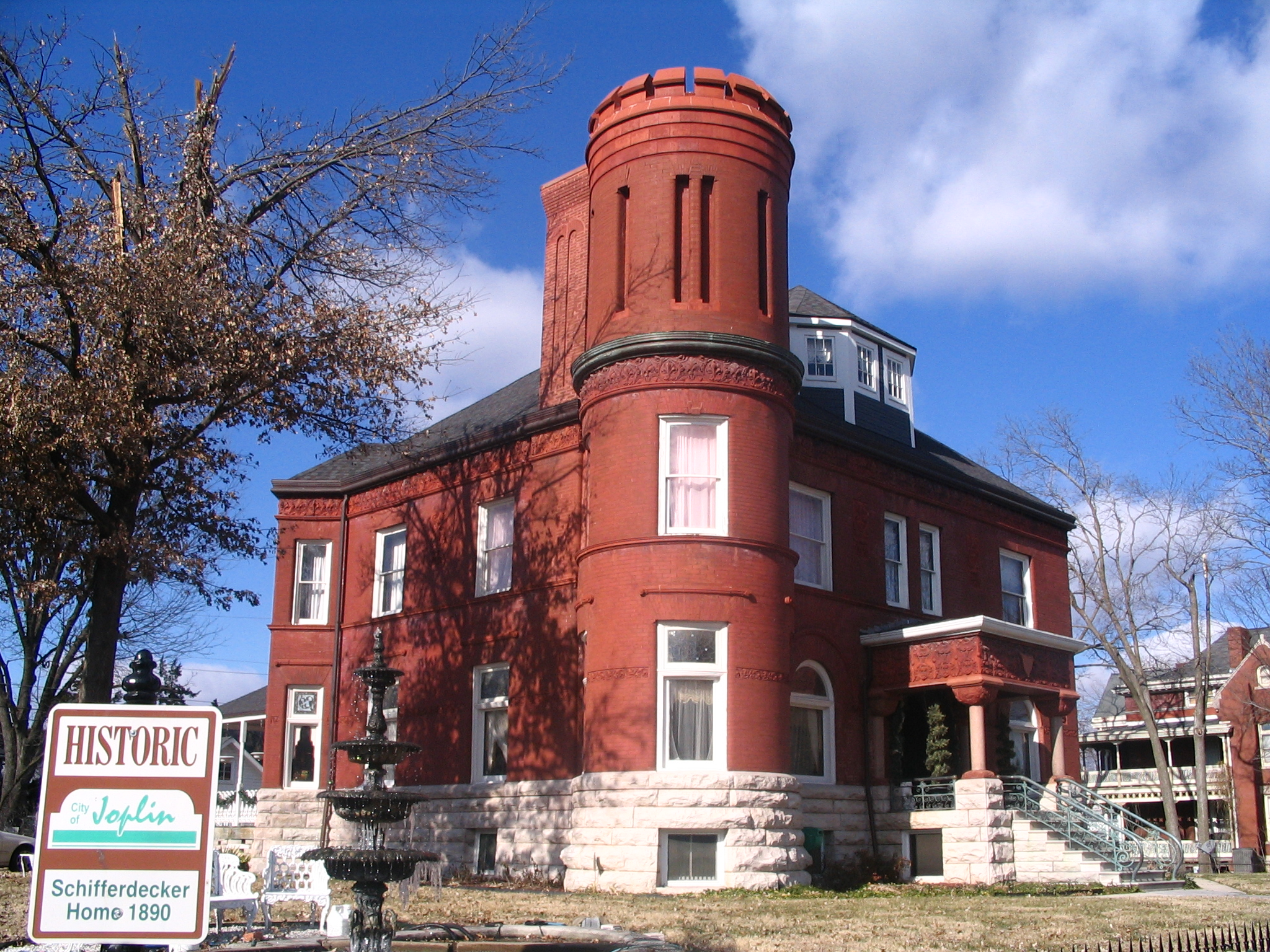
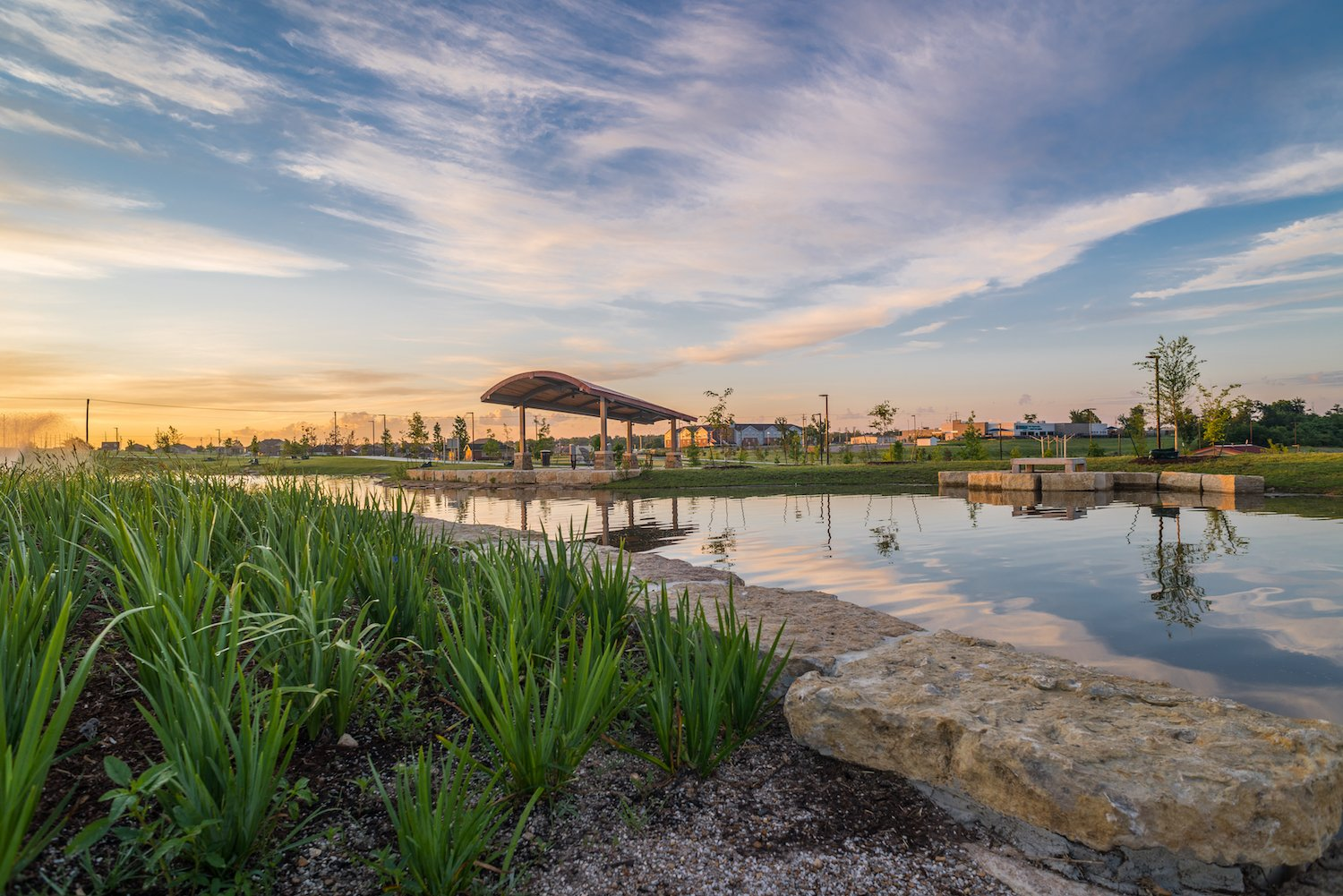
- Downtown Joplin Carnegie Library St. Peter Catholic Church Murphysburg Historic District Mercy Park

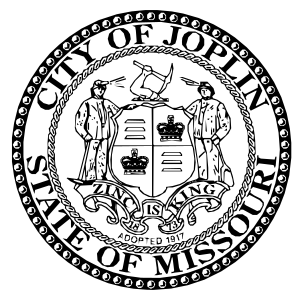
- Seal Symbol
- Nicknames: "JoMo", "The J", "J-Town", and "Go Town USA"
- Motto: "The City that Jack Built"
- Interactive map of Joplin
- Location within Missouri Location within the United States
- Coordinates: 37°5′3″N 94°30′47″W
- Country: United States
- State: Missouri
- Counties: Jasper; Newton
- Incorporated: 1873

Government
  - Mayor: Keenan Cortez

Area
  - City: 38.21 sq mi (98.96 km^{2})
  - Land: 38.08 sq mi (98.63 km^{2})
  - Water: 0.13 sq mi (0.33 km^{2})
- Elevation: 1,004 ft (306 m)

Population (2020)
  - City: 51,762
  - Rank: MO: 12th
  - Density: 1,359.3/sq mi (524.82/km^{2})
  - Metro: 214,424 (US: 135th)
- Demonym: Joplinese
- Time zone: UTC−6 (CST)
  - Summer (DST): UTC−5 (CDT)
- ZIP Codes: 64801–64804
- Area code: 417
- FIPS code: 29-37592
- GNIS feature ID: 2395482
- Website: joplinmo.org

Joplin is a city in Jasper and Newton counties in the U.S. state of Missouri. Most of the city lies in Jasper County, with the southern portion of Joplin extending into Newton County. With a population of 51,762 at the 2020 census, Joplin is the 12th most-populous city in the state. The city covers an area of 38.21 square miles (99.0 km^{2}) on the outer edge of the Ozark Mountains in southwestern Missouri. Joplin is the principal city of the three-county Joplin metropolitan area, which is home to 210,077 people and is the fifth-largest metropolitan area in Missouri. In May 2011, a violent EF5 tornado killed more than 150 people and destroyed one-third of the city.

== History ==
=== 19th century ===
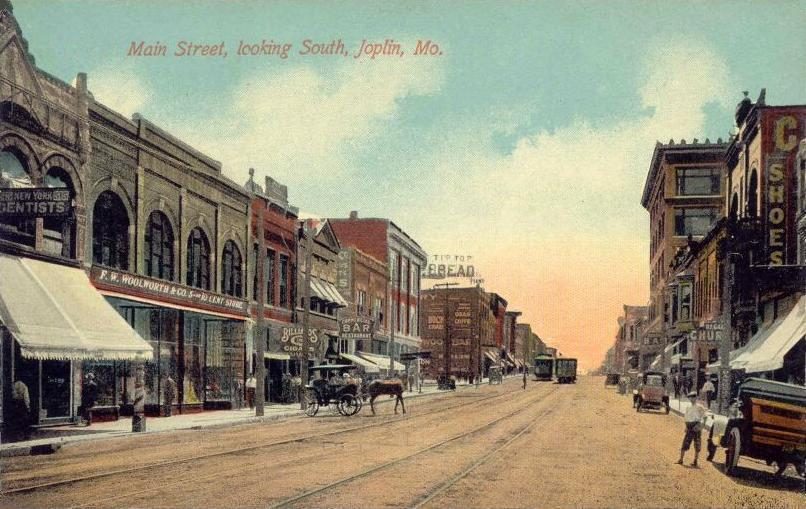
Main Street, below 5th Street, c. 1910

Lead was discovered in the Joplin Creek Valley before the Civil War, but only after the war did significant development take place. By 1871, numerous mining camps sprang up in the valley and resident John C. Cox filed a plan for a city on the east side of the valley. Cox named his village Joplin City after the spring and creek nearby, which had been named for the Reverend Harris G. Joplin, who settled upon its banks circa 1840.

Carthage resident Patrick Murphy filed a plan for a city on the opposite side of the valley and named it Murphysburg. As the nearest sheriff was in Carthage, frontier lawlessness abounded in Joplin. The historic period was referred to as the "Reign of Terror". The cities eventually merged into Union City, but when the merger was found illegal, the cities split. Murphy suggested that a combined city be named Joplin. The cities merged again on March 23, 1873, this time permanently, as the City of Joplin.

While Joplin was first settled for lead mining, zinc, often referred to as "jack", was the most important mineral resource. As railroads were built to connect Joplin to major markets in other cities, it was on the verge of dramatic growth. By the start of the 20th century, the city was becoming a regional metropolis. Construction centered around Main Street, with many bars, hotels, and fine homes nearby. Joplin's three-story "House of Lords" was its most famous saloon, with a bar and restaurant on the first floor, gambling on the second, and a brothel on the third. Trolley and rail lines made Joplin the hub of southwest Missouri. As the center of the tri-state district, it soon became the lead- and zinc-mining capital of the world.

As a result of extensive surface and deep mining, Joplin is dotted with open-pit mines and mineshafts. Mining left many tailings piles (small hills of ground rock), which are considered unsightly locally. The main part of Joplin is nearly 75% undermined, with some mine shafts well over 100 ft (30 m) deep. These shafts have occasionally caved in, creating sinkholes.

=== 20th century ===
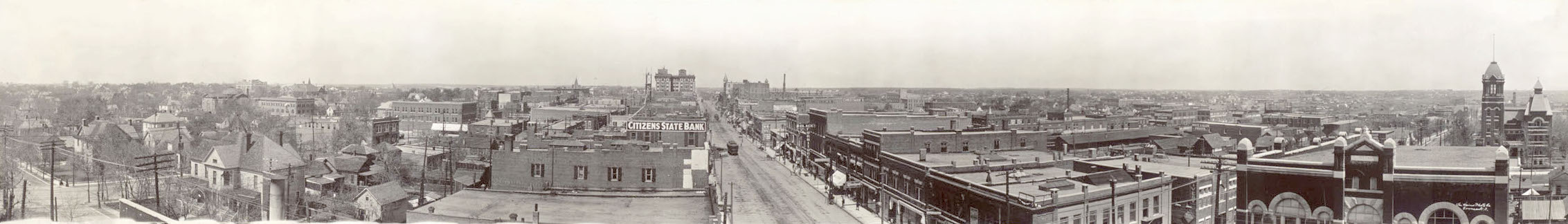
Panorama of Joplin, in 1910

Joplin began to add cultural amenities; in 1902, residents passed a tax to create a public library, and gained matching funds that enabled them to build the Carnegie Library. It was seen as the symbol of a thriving city. In 1930, the grand commercial Electric Theater was built, one of the many movie palaces of the time. It was later purchased and renamed the Fox by Fox Theatres corporation. With the Depression and post-World War II suburban development, moviegoing declined at such large venues.

On April 15, 1903, Joplin police officers, including Theodore Leslie, were searching nearby rail yards for a Black man who had allegedly stolen pistols from a hardware store when Leslie noticed a man in one of the rail cars. Shots were fired, and Leslie was mortally wounded. Hundreds of men launched a search using bloodhounds. On April 16, a Black man with a weapon, Thomas Gilyard, was arrested, and while he told one of the men involved in the arrest that he had been in the box car, he said several others had been there and that one of them fired the fatal shot. Joplin City Attorney Perl Decker pleaded with the growing mob to break up, according to newspaper and other historical accounts, as did Mayor Thomas Cunningham, but the crowd soon stormed the jail and took Gilyard from his cell. Gilyard was taken to the intersection of Fourth and Wall, where a noose was placed around his neck and he was pulled off the ground. Anti-lynching advocates attempted to seize the rope and save Gilyard, but ultimately were stopped by the mob. He was lynched soon afterward. The mob subsequently attacked the homes of Black residents, throwing stones, and setting some on fire.

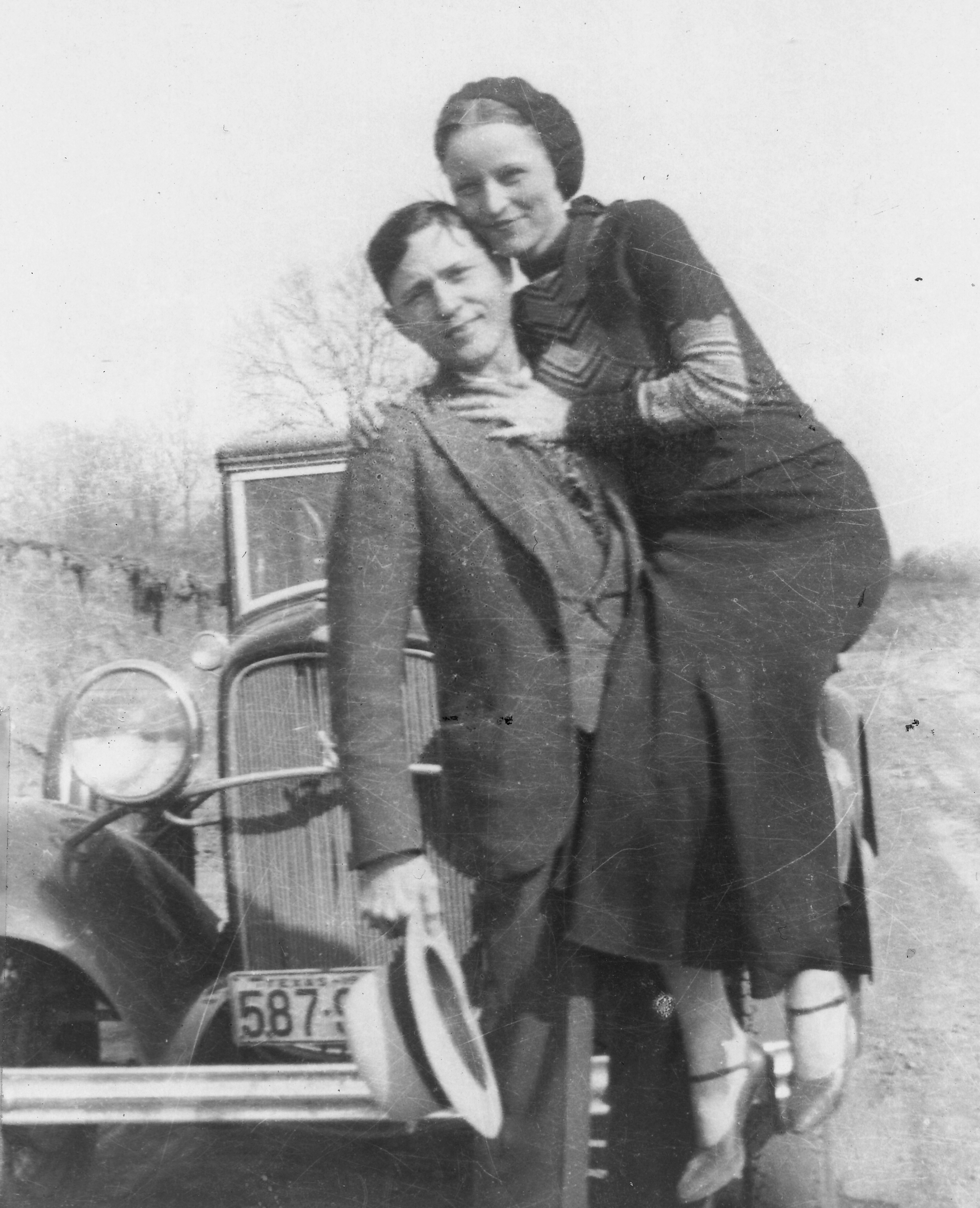
Bonnie and Clyde, photo developed by the Joplin Globe after the shootout

In 1933 during the Great Depression, the notorious criminals Bonnie and Clyde spent some weeks in Joplin, where they robbed several area businesses. Tipped off by a neighbor, the Joplin Police Department attempted to apprehend the pair. Bonnie and Clyde escaped after killing Newton County Constable John Wesley Harryman and Joplin Police Detective Harry McGinnis; however, they were forced to leave most of their possessions behind, including a camera. The Joplin Globe developed and printed the film, which showed now-legendary photos of Bonnie holding Clyde at mock gunpoint, and of Bonnie with her foot on a car fender, posed with a pistol in her hand and cigar in her mouth. The Missouri Advisory Council on Historic Preservation nominated the house where the couple stayed, at 34th Street and Oak Ridge Drive, for inclusion on the National Register of Historic Places on February 13, 2009.

After World War II, most of the mines were closed, and population growth leveled off. The main road through Joplin running east and west was designated as part of U.S. Route 66 (US 66), which became famous as more Americans took to newly constructed highways. The roads provided improved access between cities, but they also drew off population to newer housing and eventually retail centers.

In the 1960s and 1970s, nearly 40 acres (16 ha) of the city's downtown were razed in an attempt at urban renewal, as population and businesses had moved to a suburban fringe along newly constructed highways. The Keystone Hotel and Worth Block (former home of the House of Lords) were notable historic structures that were demolished. Christman's Department Store stands (converted into loft apartments), as does the Joplin Union Depot, since railroad restructuring and the decline in passenger traffic led to its closure. Other notable historic structures in Joplin include the Carnegie Library, Fred and Red's Diner, the Frisco Depot, the Scottish Rite Cathedral, and the Crystal Cave (filled in and used for a parking lot). The Newman Mercantile Store has been adapted for use as City Hall. The Fox Theatre has been adapted for use as the Central Christian Center.

On May 5, 1971, Joplin was struck by a severe tornado, resulting in one death and 60 injuries, along with major damage to many houses and businesses.

On November 11, 1978, Joplin's once-stately Connor Hotel, which was slated for implosion to make way for a new public library, collapsed suddenly and prematurely. Two demolition workers were killed instantly. A third, Alfred Sommers, was trapped for four days, yet survived.

In 1987, the former village of Sunnyvale, Missouri, merged with Joplin.

=== 21st century ===
The city had three hospitals at one time. Oak Hill Hospital, which was located at 34th & Indiana. Joplin General Hospital was founded by Dr. Kilbane and was later moved and renamed Oak Hill Hospital. Freeman Hospital merged with Oak Hill Hospital to become the Freeman-Oak Hill Hospital Health System. The city has two major hospitals now, which serve the Four States region, Freeman-Oak Hill Hospital Health System and Mercy Hospital Joplin, the latter replacing St. John's Regional Medical Center which was destroyed in the May 22, 2011, tornado. Freeman Hospital East, the former Oak Hill Hospital, and Landmark Hospital serve more specialized community health needs. The city's park system has nearly 1,000 acres (400 ha) and includes a golf course, three swimming pools, 15 miles (24 km) of walking/biking trails, Chert Glades and the Shoal Creek Nature Center located in Wildcat Park. A waterfall, Grand Falls, the highest continuously flowing in the state, is on Shoal Creek on the southern end of the city.

Numerous buildings in Joplin have been listed on the National Register of Historic Places for their historic and architectural significance. The city has undertaken Agenda 21, a major project to revitalize its Main Street downtown district, which lies on the historic Route 66. It has refurbished building facades, sidewalks, and added old-styled lamp posts, flower baskets, and benches to highlight the historic center of the city. A gasoline-powered citywide trolley system evokes images of the city's vibrant past.

Numerous trucking lines such as CFI are headquartered in town, as the city is situated near the geographic and population centers of the nation. Eagle-Picher Industries, Tamko Building Products, AT&T Communications, and Schaeffler Group are noted employers in Joplin, and Leggett & Platt (a Fortune 500) is located in nearby Carthage. The city is served by the Joplin Regional Airport located north of town near Webb City.

Since the 2011 tornado, the city continued to expand eastward toward I-44. Large-scale development occurred along Range Line Road, particularly around Northpark Mall. Numerous other smaller cities are in close proximity to the city include Carl Junction, Webb City, Duenweg, Duquesne, Airport Drive, Oronogo, Carterville, Redings Mill, Shoal Creek Drive, Leawood, and Saginaw.

Due to its location near two major highways and its few event and sports facilities, Joplin attracts travelers and is a destination for conferences and group events. Joplin offers nearly 500 hotel rooms, the majority located within a 1/4-mile area of Range Line Road and I-44. It has the 30,000-square-foot (2,800 m^{2}) John Q. Hammons Convention and Trade Center, which serves as the primary event facility for conventions, associations, and large events.

Each June, Joplin hosted the Boomtown Run, a half marathon, 5K, and children's run. The event attracts runners from across the country, and features USTA certified courses which start and end in the historic downtown area. Celebrity runners featured at the prerace banquet have included Bart Yasso, Sarah Reinerston, Suzy Favor-Hamilton, and Jeff Galloway. In 2011, due to the devastating EF5 tornado that struck Joplin on May 22, just three weeks before the run, the event was transformed in the Boomtown Run Day of Service. About 270 individuals registered for the race after the tornado struck, knowing their proceeds would benefit tornado recovery. On June 11, about 270 registered runners and volunteers turned out to help clean debris and sort donations, contributing more than 1,200 hours of service. On August 7, 2012, the Village of Silver Creek and the City of Joplin voted to have Silver Creek annexed into Joplin City limits.

==== 2011 tornado ====
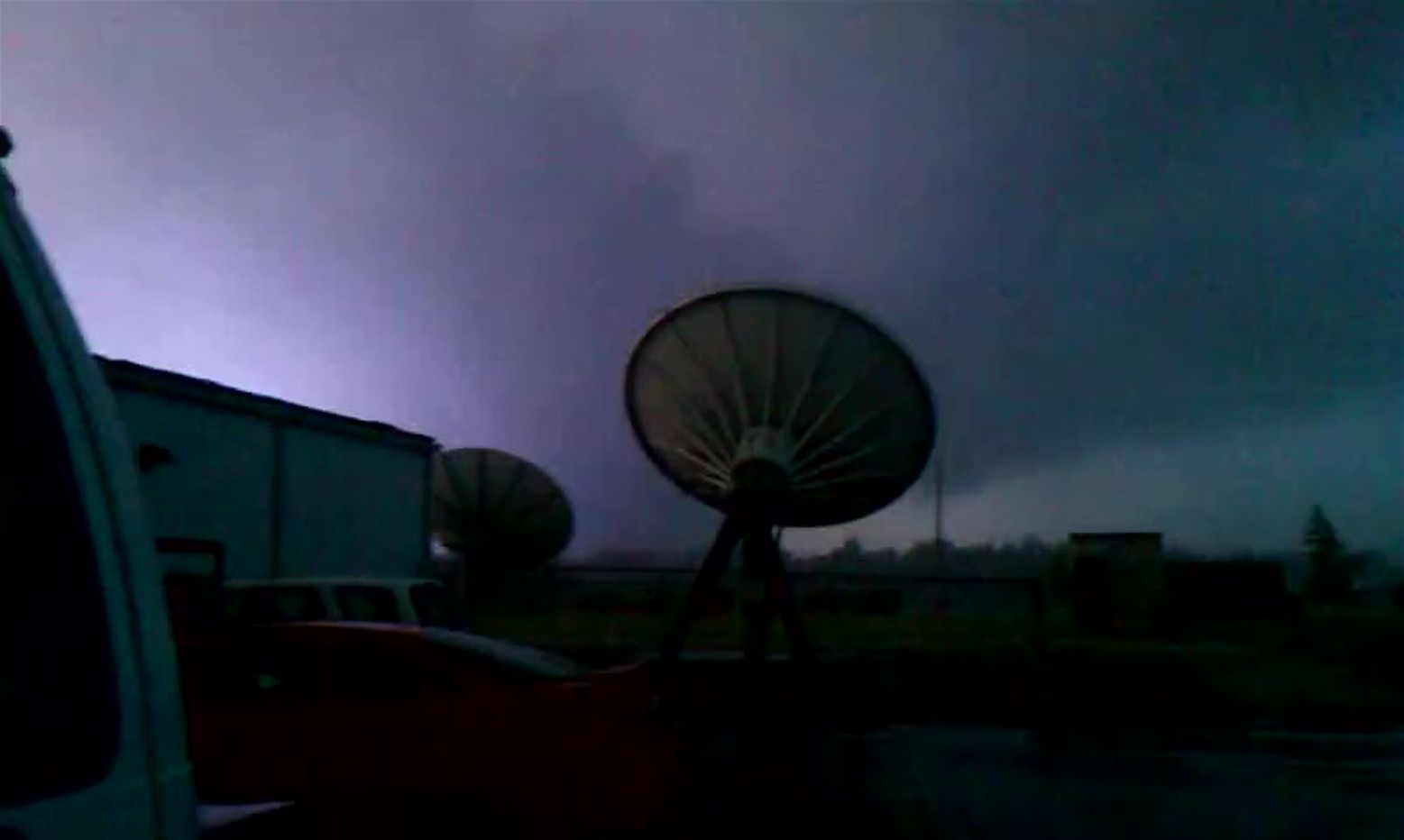
A photo of the tornado which struck the city on May 22, 2011.

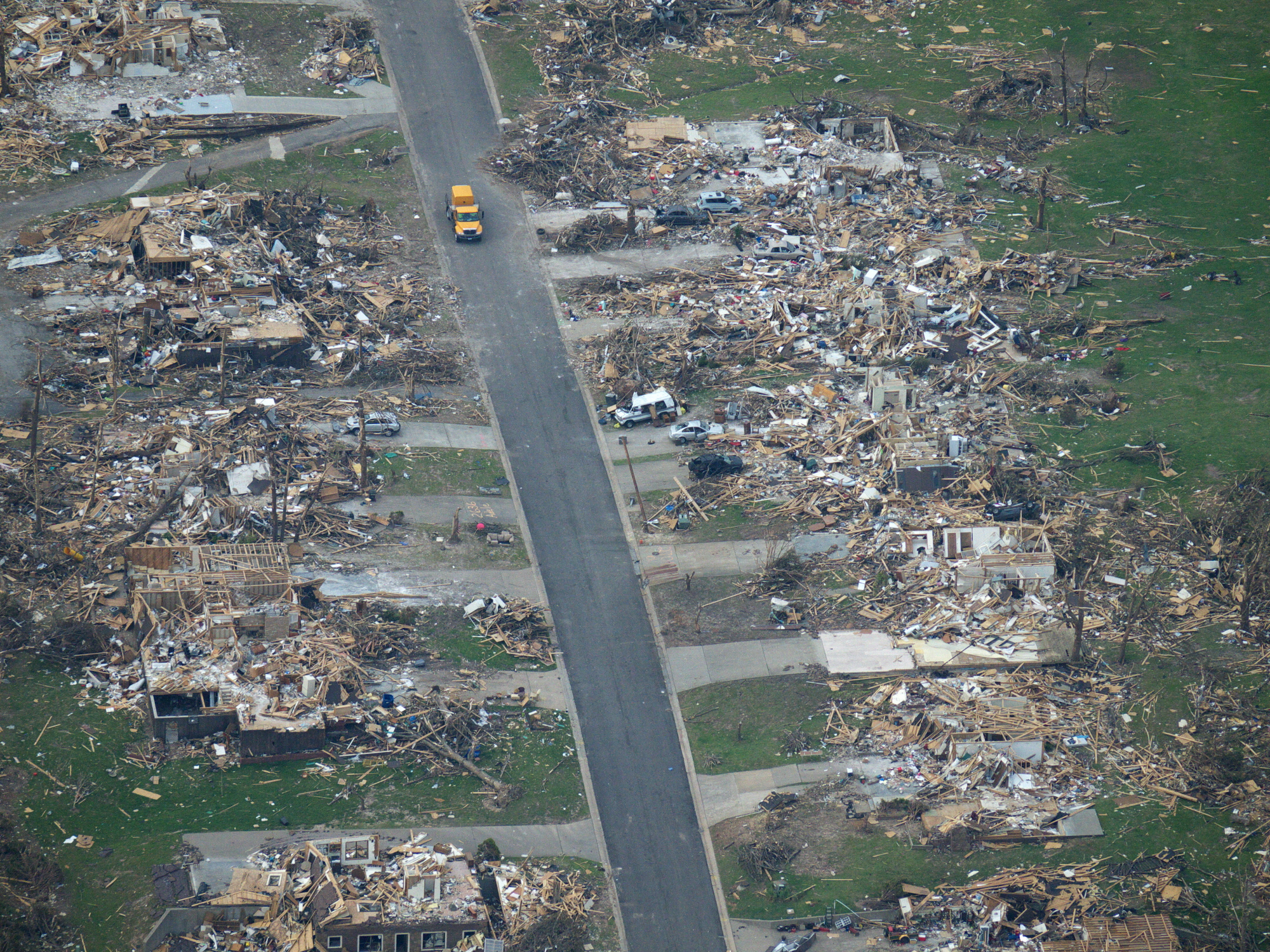
Aerial view of tornado damage

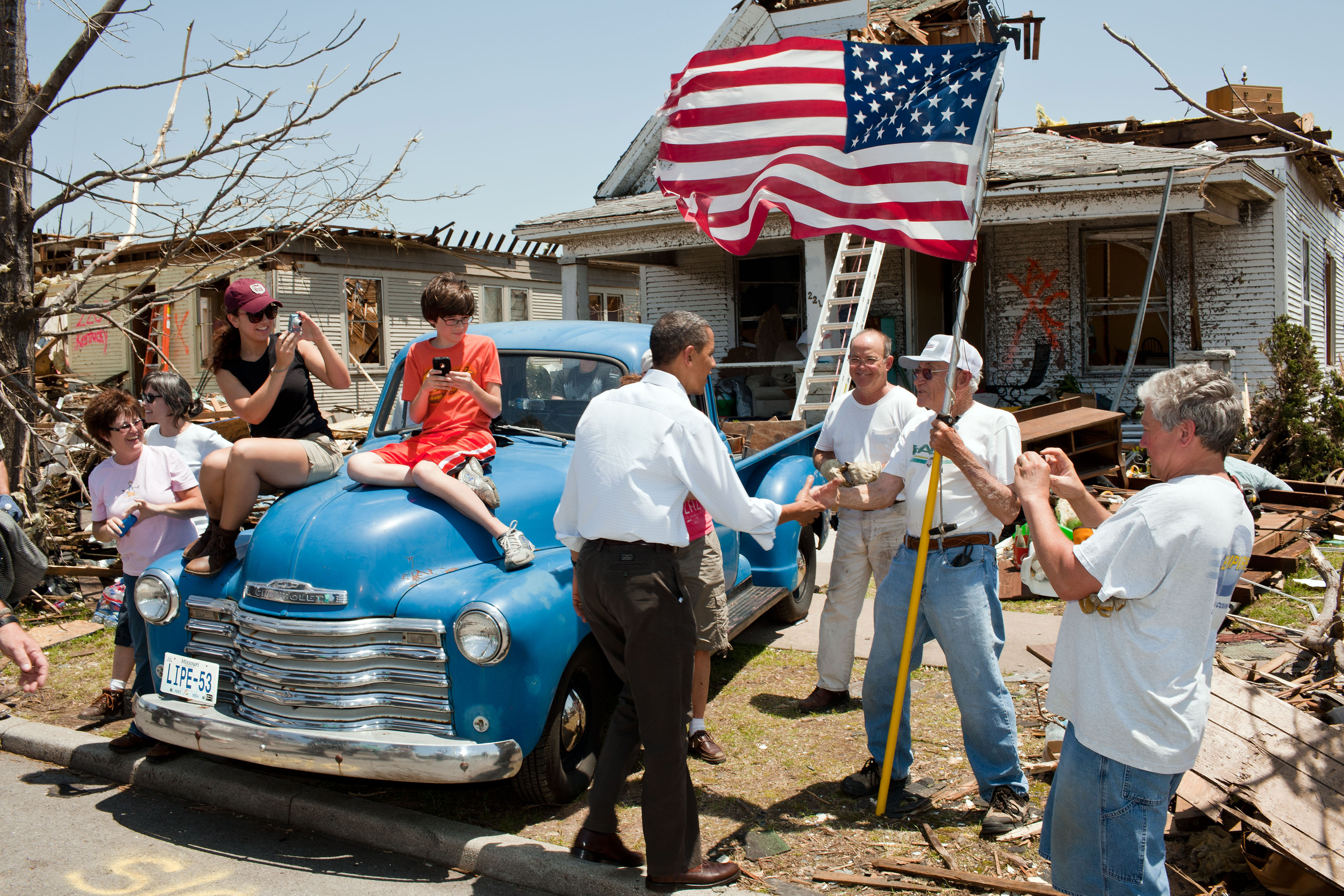
President Barack Obama greets an 85-year-old tornado survivor in front of his house on May 29, 2011.

On May 22, 2011, an EF5 tornado formed near the western edge of the city at about 5:34 pm CDT (22:34 UTC) and tracked eastward across the city and Interstate 44 into rural portions of Newton County. The tornado's damage path reached up to one mile (1.6 km) in width and 22.1 miles (35.6 km) in length, though the six miles of the path through Joplin itself contained the heaviest damage. About 2,400 houses, 1,000 cars, and businesses were flattened or blown away in Joplin, particularly in the section between 13th and 32nd Streets across the southern part of the city. The tornado narrowly missed the downtown area.

St. John's Regional Medical Center was damaged, and demolished in 2012. The Missouri Disaster Medical Assistance Team temporarily replaced the demolished St. John's Regional Medical Center with a mobile hospital until the permanent hospital was rebuilt. The local high school, Joplin High School, was totally destroyed, as well. A total of 161 people died from tornado-related injuries as of the end of July 2011. Communications were lost and power was knocked out to many areas. An official statement from the National Weather Service has categorized the tornado as an EF5. On Sunday, May 29, President Barack Obama, Missouri Governor Jay Nixon, and Federal Emergency Management Agency Director Craig Fugate visited and toured Joplin to see what the damage looked like and attended a memorial service for the deceased. Later that day, the city held a moment of silence at 5:41 p.m., to mark the time the tornado struck. The area was declared a federal disaster area.

In July 2011, the City of Joplin entered into a contractual agreement with a master developer company, hired to assist in nearly $3 billion in reconstruction efforts. Priority construction projects included residential districts and senior and assisted-living facilities; 7,500 residential dwellings in the city were damaged or destroyed by storm. The city council began receiving government funds for additional recovery projects intended to spur expansion and economic growth included the construction of a new and expanded public library and a senior center, among other city amenities of trails, sidewalks, transportation, and park enhancements. A variety of additional major projects were to follow, greatly enhancing and expanding all aspects of the community's development. City Manager Mark Rohr said, "This effort is the greatest opportunity the city has ever seen." Among other resources and support from governmental agencies, the Economic Development Administration provided $20 million to construct a new Joplin Library and a two-year funding agreement to hire a disaster recovery coordinator to help coordinate the city's nearly $850 million in immediate restoration and recovery efforts.

In the summer of 2012, the United States Housing and Urban Development Department awarded a $45 million community development block grant for reconstruction efforts and in 2013 awarded another $113 million. In May 2013, the Missouri Department of Natural Resources awarded Wildcat Glades Conservation and Audubon Center $500,000 to help with the restoration of the urban forest, which was passed through to the City of Joplin as a subgrant; 1,500 large-calibre trees were planted in the tornado zone and along an urban stream, Joplin Creek.

In May 2016, a summit was held under the name of "Joplin Disaster Recovery Summit". The summit's purpose was to tackle several issues and ensure that the recovery plans take place.

As of March 2018, the only project finished that was proposed in the recovery effort besides the hospital and schools was the new public library. Wallace-Bajjali was sued by a city they formerly contracted with and skipped town without fulfilling the contract made to refurbish Joplin.

Mercy Park was created at the site of the former hospital.

==== Tourism ====
After the May 22, 2011 tornado, a number of unofficial murals and monuments popped up across the city. These popups also showcased the beginning of an arts renaissance in Joplin which still can be seen throughout the city today. One of many monuments which popped up was the Rainbow Tree, which was found on 20th Street between Indiana Avenue and Illinois Avenue. The Rainbow Tree, not to be confused with the since-fallen Spirit Tree, was a tree which was destroyed in the May 22, 2011 tornado that the community decorated with bird houses, bird feeders, colored paint, and a sign saying "Help Us Feed The Birds"; as of November 2022, it had also fallen. After the tornado, butterflies became a major part of the artistic works in the city due to the stories of children seeing butterfly entities carrying people through the sky shortly after the tornado which spread across the community of Joplin. One of the first works in Joplin to incorporate Butterflies was the "Butterfly Effect: Dreams Take Flight" Mural which is located on the Northwest corner of 15th and Main Street. The piece was painted by Dave Loewenstein with the support of a 20 community member design team and more than 300 community volunteers.

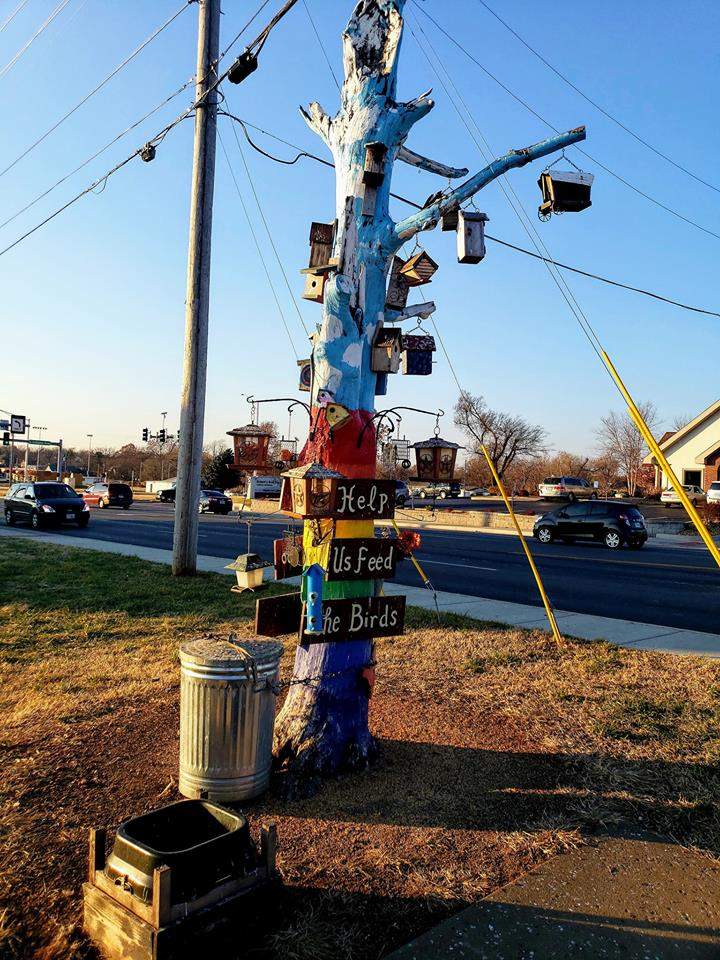
Former Joplin Rainbow Tree

On March 15, 2018, the City of Joplin conducted an independent tourism study which covered the purpose of the study, evaluation process, competitive market summary, recommendations, and implementations. In the overview, the City states its strategic priorities for tourism which were improve the visitor experience, increase the number of visitors, capture visitor spending, and emphasize results-driven tourism marketing. The purpose of the study was to provide direction for Joplin to help define the focus for future tourism efforts. In the study the city mentions the strengths, weaknesses, opportunities, and threats of the tourism market in the region as well as recommendations to increase tourism in the city. One of the recommendations in the study was to develop a conference center with an incorporated or adjacent hotel which could accommodate groups up to 2,500 and include multi-use exhibit space, breakout rooms and the newest technology. Another recommendation was to enhance downtown by encouraging hotel development in downtown, supporting and promoting development of empire market and food culture, supporting development of an Arts & Entertainment complex, supporting efforts of Connect2Culture and the broader art community relating facilities and programs downtown, hosting a variety of special events downtown, promoting downtown as a location for dining, shopping and culture, and continuing Main Street and downtown core improvements. It is recommended that the first step for the CVB Board is to discuss and decide which of the recommendations they see as priorities and take these to City Council for their recommendation. Additionally, the CVB should start collecting visitor data, undertake Identity and Branding study (with the city as lead or in partnership with the city), work on increasing lodging tax, ear-marked for conference center use the Tourism Study as a roadmap for future decision-making.

In September 2019, Joplin unveiled the Rotary Sculpture Garden in Mercy Park which is home to 9 new sculptures with more on the way. The project was a joint effort of Joplin Rotary Club and Joplin Daybreak Rotary Club and all the Sculptures were donated. One by Sharon and Lance Beshore, one by Barbara and Jim Hicklin, and seven by Harry M. Cornell Jr., an art collector and chairman emeritus of Leggett & Platt Inc. On February 7, 2019, the Joplin Rotary Club donated over $9,800 which funded signage at the entrance of the walking paths in Mercy Park. The sculpture garden represents a $200,000 investment by community members who looked for the works of art, bought them, and donated them for permanent display.

Joplin's local heritage, including its mining heritage, is celebrated by the Joplin History and Mineral Museum in Schifferdecker Park. The museum contains wings dedicated to (a) local history, and (b) the minerals of the world, particularly those found during the era of lead and zinc mining in Southwest Missouri and the Tri-State Region. An outdoor display near the museum features used mining equipment used for production in the Joplin region, including pieces of heavy machinery.

The Ghost Light or Spooklight, a mysterious orb supposedly spotted by locals and tourists, is also located in the region around Joplin.

== Geography ==
Joplin is the center of what is regionally known as the Four State Area: Oklahoma, Arkansas, Missouri, and Kansas. Joplin is located north of I-44, its passage to the west into Oklahoma. In recent years, the residential development of Joplin has spread north to Webb City. Route 66 (formerly US 66) passes through Joplin, as 7th Street.

The city is drained by Joplin, Turkey, Silver and Shoal creeks.

According to the United States Census Bureau, the city has a total area of 35.68 square miles (92.41 km^{2}), of which 35.56 square miles (92.10 km^{2}) is land and 0.12 square miles (0.31 km^{2}) is water.

=== Neighborhoods ===
Roanoke, Arbor Hills, Blendville, Gateway Drive, Iron Gates, Eastmorland, Midway, Murphysburg, North Heights, Oak Pointe, Royal Heights, Silver Creek, Sunnyvale, Sunset Ridge, Westberry Square, and Cedar Ridge are among the many neighborhoods in Joplin.

=== Climate ===
Joplin has a humid subtropical climate (Cfa), as defined by the Köppen climate classification system, with cool, dry winters and hot, humid summers; the severe weather season from April through June is the wettest time of year. The monthly daily average temperature ranges from 34.9 °F (1.6 °C) in January to 79.9 °F (26.6 °C) in July. On average, 52.7 days of 90 °F (32 °C)+ highs, 4.5 days of 100 °F (38 °C)+ highs, 12.5 days where the high fails to rise above freezing, and 1.1 nights of sub-0 °F (−18 °C) occur per year. It has an average annual precipitation of 45.58 inches (1,160 mm), including an average 12.5 inches (32 cm) of snow. Extremes in temperature range from −21 °F (−29 °C) on February 13, 1905 up to 115 °F (46 °C) on July 14, 1954; the last −10 °F (−23 °C) or below and the last 110 °F (43 °C)+ reading occurred on February 3 and August 2, 2011, respectively.

The city is located in Tornado Alley. Notable severe weather events in the past half-century include an F3 tornado in 1971 and an EF5 tornado on May 22, 2011.

Climate data for Joplin Regional Airport, Missouri (1991–2020 normals, extremes 1902–present)
| Month | Jan | Feb | Mar | Apr | May | Jun | Jul | Aug | Sep | Oct | Nov | Dec | Year |
|---|---|---|---|---|---|---|---|---|---|---|---|---|---|
| Record high °F (°C) | 79 (26) | 87 (31) | 94 (34) | 96 (36) | 96 (36) | 104 (40) | 115 (46) | 110 (43) | 105 (41) | 94 (34) | 87 (31) | 76 (24) | 115 (46) |
| Mean daily maximum °F (°C) | 44.8 (7.1) | 50.0 (10.0) | 59.8 (15.4) | 69.2 (20.7) | 77.0 (25.0) | 85.9 (29.9) | 90.3 (32.4) | 90.0 (32.2) | 82.0 (27.8) | 70.7 (21.5) | 58.4 (14.7) | 47.8 (8.8) | 68.8 (20.4) |
| Daily mean °F (°C) | 34.9 (1.6) | 39.4 (4.1) | 48.6 (9.2) | 57.9 (14.4) | 66.5 (19.2) | 75.6 (24.2) | 79.9 (26.6) | 79.0 (26.1) | 70.7 (21.5) | 59.3 (15.2) | 47.8 (8.8) | 38.1 (3.4) | 58.1 (14.5) |
| Mean daily minimum °F (°C) | 25.0 (−3.9) | 28.7 (−1.8) | 37.4 (3.0) | 46.6 (8.1) | 56.0 (13.3) | 65.3 (18.5) | 69.5 (20.8) | 67.9 (19.9) | 59.4 (15.2) | 47.9 (8.8) | 37.1 (2.8) | 28.5 (−1.9) | 47.4 (8.6) |
| Record low °F (°C) | −12 (−24) | −21 (−29) | −5 (−21) | 19 (−7) | 30 (−1) | 44 (7) | 50 (10) | 46 (8) | 30 (−1) | 18 (−8) | 6 (−14) | −15 (−26) | −21 (−29) |
| Average precipitation inches (mm) | 1.92 (49) | 1.98 (50) | 3.29 (84) | 4.99 (127) | 6.56 (167) | 5.60 (142) | 3.97 (101) | 3.36 (85) | 4.18 (106) | 3.80 (97) | 3.33 (85) | 2.60 (66) | 45.58 (1,158) |
| Average snowfall inches (cm) | 4.7 (12) | 3.5 (8.9) | 1.1 (2.8) | 0.0 (0.0) | 0.0 (0.0) | 0.0 (0.0) | 0.0 (0.0) | 0.0 (0.0) | 0.0 (0.0) | 0.0 (0.0) | 0.4 (1.0) | 2.8 (7.1) | 12.5 (32) |
| Average precipitation days (≥ 0.01 in) | 7.7 | 6.7 | 10.1 | 11.0 | 12.5 | 10.2 | 8.5 | 7.5 | 7.6 | 8.8 | 7.8 | 7.7 | 106.1 |
| Average snowy days (≥ 0.1 in) | 2.6 | 2.0 | 0.9 | 0.1 | 0.0 | 0.0 | 0.0 | 0.0 | 0.0 | 0.1 | 0.3 | 2.3 | 8.3 |
Source: NOAA (snow 1981–2010)

== Demographics ==
Historical population
| Census | Pop. | Note | %± |
|---|---|---|---|
| 1880 | 7,038 | | — |
| 1890 | 9,943 | | 41.3% |
| 1900 | 26,023 | | 161.7% |
| 1910 | 32,073 | | 23.2% |
| 1920 | 29,902 | | −6.8% |
| 1930 | 33,454 | | 11.9% |
| 1940 | 37,144 | | 11.0% |
| 1950 | 38,711 | | 4.2% |
| 1960 | 38,958 | | 0.6% |
| 1970 | 39,256 | | 0.8% |
| 1980 | 39,126 | | −0.3% |
| 1990 | 40,961 | | 4.7% |
| 2000 | 45,504 | | 11.1% |
| 2010 | 50,150 | | 10.2% |
| 2020 | 51,762 | | 3.2% |
| 2025 (est.) | 53,930 | | 4.2% |
U.S. Decennial Census; 2018 Estimate

=== 2020 census ===
As of the 2020 census, Joplin had a population of 51,762, with a population density of 1,359.3 inhabitants per square mile (524.8/km^{2}). 98.9% of residents lived in urban areas, while 1.1% lived in rural areas.

There were 21,664 households and 11,973 families; the average household size was 2.3 and the average family size was 3.0. Of these households, 27.2% had children under the age of 18 living in them, 37.3% were married-couple households, 21.3% were households with a male householder and no spouse or partner present, and 32.1% were households with a female householder and no spouse or partner present. About 34.1% of all households were made up of individuals, and 13.0% had someone living alone who was 65 years of age or older.

There were 24,052 housing units, of which 9.9% were vacant. The homeowner vacancy rate was 2.7% and the rental vacancy rate was 9.7%.

The median age was 35.8 years; 21.5% of residents were under the age of 18 and 17.0% of residents were 65 years of age or older. For every 100 females there were 93.0 males, and for every 100 females age 18 and over there were 91.1 males age 18 and over.

Racial composition as of the 2020 census
| Race | Number | Percent |
|---|---|---|
| White | 41,283 | 79.8% |
| Black or African American | 1,659 | 3.2% |
| American Indian and Alaska Native | 1,104 | 2.1% |
| Asian | 989 | 1.9% |
| Native Hawaiian and Other Pacific Islander | 297 | 0.6% |
| Some other race | 1,280 | 2.5% |
| Two or more races | 5,150 | 9.9% |
| Hispanic or Latino (of any race) | 3,246 | 6.3% |

=== 2016–2020 American Community Survey ===
The 2016–2020 5-year American Community Survey estimates show that the median household income was $45,091 (with a margin of error of +/- $2,832) and the median family income $57,169 (+/- $3,957). Males had a median income of $31,663 (+/- $2,205) versus $23,397 (+/- $1,957) for females. The median income for those above 16 years old was $26,899 (+/- $1,189). Approximately, 13.9% of families and 18.3% of the population were below the poverty line, including 22.2% of those under the age of 18 and 11.7% of those ages 65 or over.

=== 2010 census ===
As of the 2010 census, 50,150 people, 20,860 households, and 12,212 families resided in the city. The population density was 1,448.4 inhabitants per square mile (559.2/km^{2}). The 23,322 housing units averaged 678.9 per square mile (262.1/km^{2}). The racial makeup of the city is 87.6% White, 3.3% African American, 1.8% Native American, 1.6% Asian, 0.3% Pacific Islander, 1.7 from other races, and 3.6% from two or more races. Hispanics or Latinos of any race were 4.5% of the population.

Of the 20,860 households, 24.6% had children under the age of 18 living with them, 40.1% were married couples living together, 13.5% had a female householder with no husband present, and 41.5% were not families; 29.4% of all households were made up of individuals, and 25.3% had someone living alone who was 65 years of age or older. The average household size was 2.28 and the average family size was 2.89.

In the city, the population was distributed as 24.21% under the age of 19, 9.4% from 20 to 24, 25.12% from 25 to 44, 22.16% from 45 to 64, and 13.18% who were 65 years of age or older. The median age was 35 years. For every 100 females, there were 90.4 males.

=== 2000 census ===
As of 2000, the median income for a household in the city was $30,555, and for a family was $38,888. Males had a median income of $28,569 versus $20,665 for females. The per capita income for the city was $17,738. About 10.5% of families and 14.8% of the population were below the poverty line, including 18.8% of those under age 18 and 9.4% of those age 65 or over.

== Economy ==
=== Top employers ===
According to the city's 2019 Comprehensive Annual Financial Report, the top employers in the city are:

| # | Employer | # of employees |
|---|---|---|
| 1 | Freeman Health System | 4,500 |
| 2 | Walmart | 2,400 |
| 3 | Mercy Hospital Joplin | 1,538 |
| 4 | Joplin School District | 1,480 |
| 5 | Tri-State Motor Transit | 1,135 |
| 6 | Tamko Building Products | 1,000 |
| 7 | Empire District Electric Company | 896 |
| 8 | Eagle-Picher | 778 |
| 9 | Alorica | 595 |
| 10 | City of Joplin | 585 |
| 11 | CFI | 567 |
| 12 | Ozark Center | 567 |
| 13 | Missouri Southern State University | 560 |
| 14 | General Mills | 490 |
| 15 | AT&T Mobility | 448 |
| 16 | Jasper Products | 399 |
| 17 | Teleperformance (Aegis Communications) | 350 |
| 18 | Schaeffler Group | 310 |
| 19 | Bemis Company | 275 |
| 20 | Hampshire Pet Products | 245 |

== Government ==
Local government for the City of Joplin is provided through a nine-member city council, whose members are elected by voters citywide, with four seats being assigned to designated geographic zones of the city. City council members include the city's mayor, who is responsible for serving as meeting chair and official spokesman for the city council; and the mayor pro tem, who is responsible for performing the mayor's duties in absence. Both positions are elected every two years by their fellow council members.

As of 2024, the city council members include:

- Keenan Cortez [General] (Mayor)
- Josh DeTar [General] (Mayor Pro Tem)
- Joshua Bard [General]
- Doris Carlin [General]
- Doug Lawson [General]
- Gary Shaw [Zone I]
- Charles Copple [Zone II]
- Ryan Jackson [Zone III]
- Mark Farnham [Zone IV]

Law enforcement services are provided by the Joplin Police Department. On the state-level, the city is represented in the Missouri House of Representatives by Republican Lane Roberts of the 161st District, although a small portion of the city lies within the 162nd District represented by Republican Bob Bromley and in the Missouri Senate by Republican Jill Carter. The city also lies within Missouri's 7th congressional district, currently represented by Eric Burlison (R-Springfield).

== Education ==
=== Primary and secondary education ===
The majority of Joplin is in the Joplin R-VIII School District. Joplin is home to 10 public elementary schools in the Joplin school district: Cecil Floyd, Dover Hill, Eastmorland, Irving, Jefferson, Kelsey Norman, McKinley, Royal Heights, Soaring Heights, and Stapleton. It has three public middle schools, East, North, and South, and one high school, Joplin High School. The first high school was founded in 1885 and was located at the intersection of West 4th Street and Byers Ave. The JHS student population was nearly 2,200 children in the 2008–2009 school year. A school bond issue for $57.4 million was passed in April 2007, allowing the district to build two new middle schools (East and South Middle Schools) to replace the old Memorial and South Middle schools, and to give a major renovation and double the size of North Middle School.

Parts of Joplin in Jasper County extend into Webb City R-VII School District and Carl Junction R-I School District. Parts of Joplin in Newton County extend into Carl Junction R-I School District, Diamond R-IV School District, and Seneca R-VII School District.

Joplin also has many private schools, such as New Heights Christian Academy, Martin Luther School, Thomas Jefferson Independent Day School, Christ's Community Discovery School, and more. St. Mary's Catholic Elementary School, St. Peter's Middle School, and McAuley Catholic High School are private Catholic schools established in 1885.

Missouri Schools for the Severely Disabled (MSSD) is a state operated program serving Missouri students with severe disabilities in the greater Joplin area at College View State School.

=== Colleges and universities ===
The Joplin College of Physicians and Surgeons operated from 1880 to 1884. Today, Joplin is home to Missouri Southern State University, founded in 1937 as a junior college and expanded in the following decades. The one Bible college is Ozark Christian College. Messenger College also operated in Joplin until 2012 when the Pentecostal Church of God moved the campus to Euless, Texas that year.

Kansas City University of Medicine and Biosciences announced in March 2015 its intention to establish a campus in Joplin with a large osteopathic medicine program, to be located in Mercy Hospital-Joplin's former long-term temporary location near the site of the destroyed St. John's Regional Medical Center. In 2017, KCU took in their first class at the Farber-McIntire Campus. The campus is nearly 20,000 square feet and includes a large lecture hall, learning studio and lab dedicated to osteopathic manipulative medicine courses. KCU-Joplin also shares a partnership with Freeman Health Systems and Mercy Hospital Joplin.

Joplin is also home to technical schools including Franklin Technology Center, and WTI.

=== Library ===
Joplin is served by the Joplin Public Library. In 2013, the Economic Development Administration awarded the city $20 million to relocate the dated library to a new facility along 20th Street, in the heart of the tornado area. In June 2017, the new, state-of-the-art 48,000-square-foot (4,500 m^{2}) library opened to the public. Costing nearly $20,000,000, the new facility has meeting and event rooms and spaces, an outdoor plaza and courtyard, children's, teen and adult book collection areas, and maker-spaces and equipment for creative arts and business innovators.

== Transportation ==
Joplin is served by the mainline of the Canadian Pacific Kansas City (CPKC) Railway, as well as by branchlines of the BNSF Railway and Missouri and Northern Arkansas Railroad (MNA). The city was once a beehive of railroad activity; however, many of the original railroad lines serving Joplin, such as the Missouri and North Arkansas Railroad, were abandoned after the demise of the mining and industrial enterprises. The Missouri and North Arkansas had connected Joplin with Helena, Arkansas. Passenger trains have not served the city since the 1960s. The Joplin Union Depot is still intact along the KCS mainline, and efforts are underway to restore it. Despite the decline in some rail lines in and around Joplin during the past five decades, many of the original lines still remain. Aside from the former Frisco Railroad route from Joplin to Webb City and the Carthage to Wichita, Kansas, lines that have since been converted into bike/hike trails, most of the original routes still remain in place under the control of the BNSF, KCS, and M&NA railroad companies.

Interstate 44 connects Joplin with Springfield and St. Louis to the east and Tulsa and Oklahoma City to the west. U.S. Route 71 runs east of the city, connecting Joplin to Kansas City to the north and Fayetteville, Arkansas, to the south. The segment from Kansas City to Joplin was designated I-49 on December 12, 2012.

Range Line Road is the primary north and south commercial district with traffic approaching 25,000 vehicles daily. In 2022 the Range Line Road bridge over Kansas City Southern Railroad line was replaced and made taller and wider to accommodate growth.

Previously, Interstate 66 was proposed along the current Interstate 44 alignment from St. Louis and extending along the US 400 alignment to Wichita, Kansas, but, despite lobbying by both Missouri and Kansas, the project has been cancelled due to resistance farther east and west along the proposed extended alignment.

Joplin once boasted an extensive trolley and inter-urban rail system. Today, part of the city is served by the Sunshine Lamp Trolley, which commenced service in July 2007, and expanded to three routes in 2009.

In addition, the Joplin Regional Airport provides daily roundtrip flights to Denver international airport and Chicago-O'Hare International Airport operated by United Express as United Airlines.

Intercity bus service to the city is provided by Greyhound Lines and Jefferson Lines.

== Notable people ==
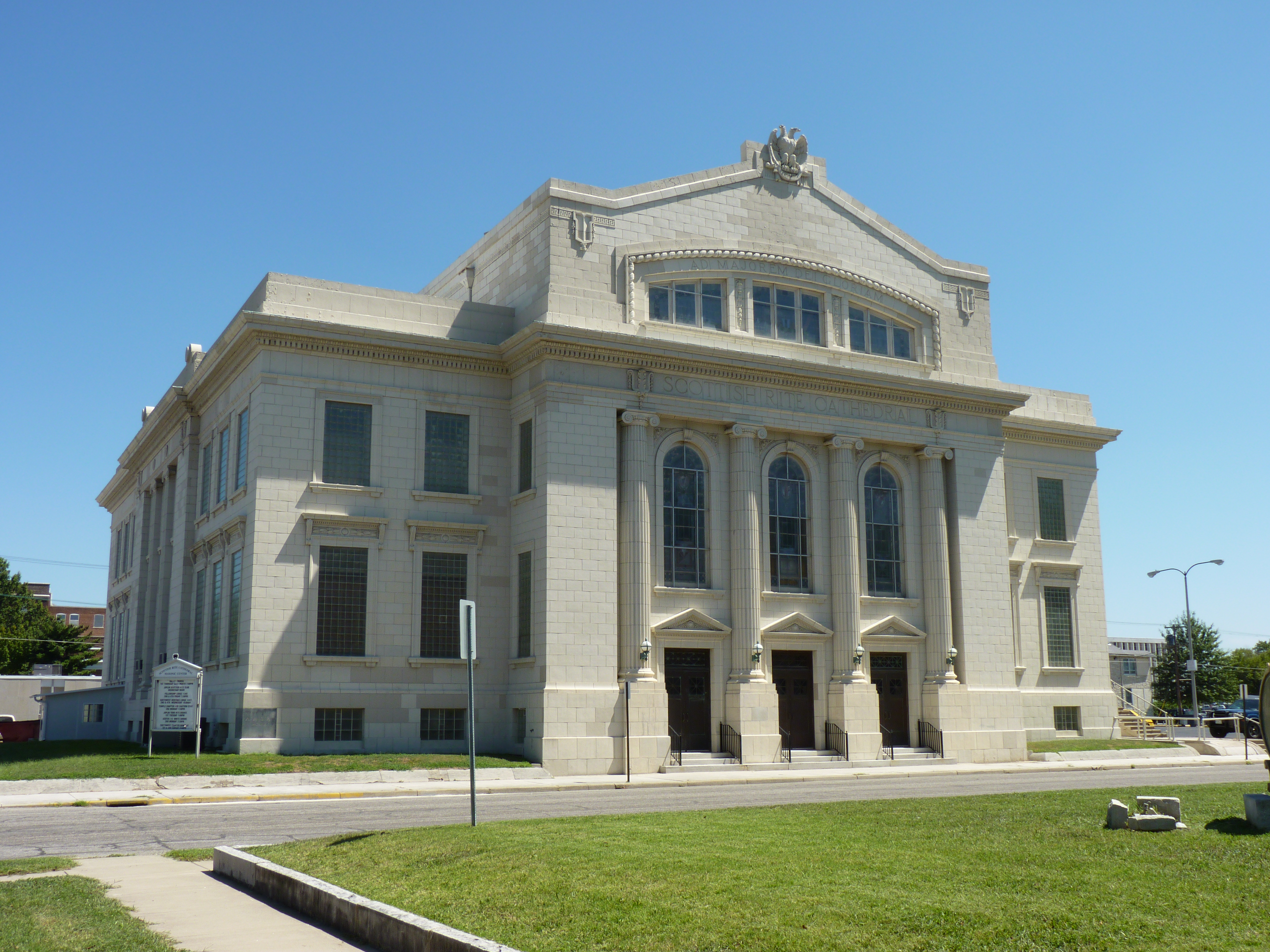
Scottish Rite Cathedral in Joplin, 2010

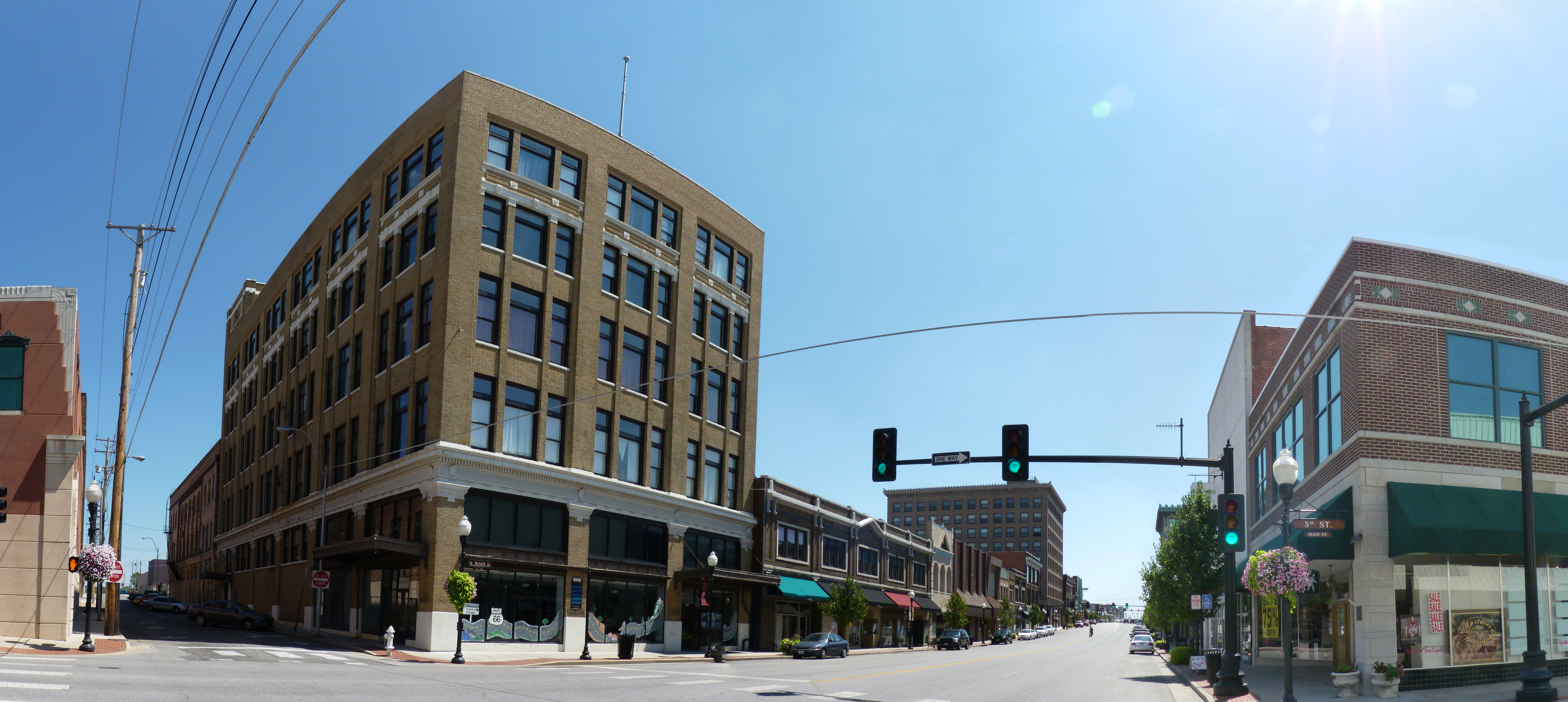
Historic district at 5th and Main in Joplin, 2010

- Tony Alamo, religious evangelist and polygamist
- John Whitby Allen, photographer and model railroading pioneer
- John Beal, actor
- Emily Newell Blair, writer, suffragist, national Democratic Party political leader, a founder of the League of Women Voters and feminist
- Betty Brewer, actress
- Norma Lee Clark, author, private secretary to Woody Allen
- Billy Cook, spree killer
- Robert Cummings, actor, star of films and television's The Bob Cummings Show
- Isaiah Davis, current NFL running back, with the New York Jets since 2024
- Pauline Donnan, opera singer
- Christofer Drew, musician
- Scott Elbert, Major League Baseball pitcher
- Glen Glenn, singer
- Jane Grant, co-founder of The New Yorker magazine
- Langston Hughes, poet and writer, for whom Langston Hughes Broadway in Joplin is named
- Hale Irwin, golfer, three-time U.S. Open champion
- H. Dale Jackson, Baptist minister and ethicist, lived in Joplin with his wife when they were newly married in 1949
- Jack Jewsbury, former player and captain of the Portland Timbers of Major League Soccer
- Alonzo May, economist
- Tito Landrum, baseball player
- Charles McCord, retired broadcaster and writer for the Imus in the Morning radio program
- Jamie McMurray, NASCAR driver
- Charles McPherson, jazz musician
- Elva Miller, singer
- Victor J. Miller, 33rd Mayor of St. Louis
- Lisa Myers, broadcast journalist
- J. Eddie Peck, actor, was raised in Joplin, graduated from Parkwood High School
- Charles Plumb, cartoonist of the syndicated Ella Cinders comic strip
- Carl Pomerance, mathematician
- Darrell Porter, baseball player, World Series champion and 4-time All-Star
- Vance Powell, Grammy winning record producer.
- Mel Purcell, tennis player
- Ron Richard, Missouri Senate President Pro Tempore, State House Speaker, and Mayor of Joplin
- Lane Roberts, Missouri State Representative and Chief of the Joplin Police Department
- Pattiann Rogers, poet
- Wayne Shanklin, music producer and songwriter
- Frank Shellenback, baseball pitcher in Pacific Coast League Hall of Fame
- Pauline Starke, silent-film actress
- Gabby Street, manager of the St. Louis Cardinals; adopted Joplin as his hometown
- William Tobin, journalist
- Dennis Weaver, actor, star of films and television's Gunsmoke and McCloud
- Travis Webb, racing driver
- Percy Wenrich, composer
- Bill White, Missouri State Senator and State Representative
- Grant Wistrom, former NFL defensive end, Super Bowl champion with St. Louis Rams
- Grace Steele Woodward, writer and historian
- Frank L. Yale, Colonel, cofounder of the Joplin Stock Exchange
