= McAuley Catholic High School (Joplin, Missouri) =

Location
- 930 Pearl Avenue; Joplin, (Jasper County), Missouri 64801; United States; 37°4′52″N 94°31′3″W

Information
- Type: Private, Coeducational
- Religious affiliation: Roman Catholic
- Established: 1885
- School board: Joplin Area Catholic Schools
- Director: Jess Sickman
- Principal: Steve Gilbreth
- Grades: 9–12
- Classes: Art, Business, Journalism, Language Arts, Mathematics, Physical Education, Psychology, Religion, Science, Social Studies, Spanish, Theater
- Student to teacher ratio: 9:1
- Colors: Royal Blue and White
- Athletics conference: Ozark 7 Conference
- Mascot: Warrior
- Rival: Thomas Jefferson Independent Day School
- Accreditation: Missouri Association for Accreditation of Non-Public Schools
- Newspaper: McAuley Times
- Yearbook: The Shield
- Website: www.jacss.org/page/mc-highschool

McAuley Catholic High School is a private, parochial school in Joplin, Missouri.

== Description ==
Located in the Diocese of Springfield-Cape Girardeau, it is a regional school serving Joplin and the surrounding communities; it has an enrollment of approximately 70 students. It is accredited by the Missouri Association for Accreditation of Non-Public Schools.

== History ==
McAuley Catholic High School was established in 1885. The school has celebrated over 135 years of Catholic education in the Joplin area.

The school was forced to convert their nearby storage building into the replacement elementary school over the summer of 2011 as the original was destroyed in a deadly tornado on May 22, 2011. In 2016 the building was used for St. Peter's Middle School as St. Mary's Elementary school has built a new building at 3025 S Central City Rd.

In 2021, St. Peter's Middle School was moved to the building of McAuley High School.

== Notable alumni ==
- Ron Richard (1965) Speaker of the Missouri House of Representatives
- C. W. Moss (2006) Author and illustrator of "Unicorn Being a Jerk"
