= Blendville, Joplin =

Neighborhood in Joplin, Missouri, United States

Coordinates: 37.0672833°N 94.526614°W

Blendville is a neighborhood of Joplin, Missouri.

== History ==
Blendville was originally called Blend City, and under the latter name was founded in the 1870s, and named for ore blending near the original town site. A post office called Blendsville was established in 1890, and remained in operation until 1900. The community was annexed to Joplin in 1892.
