= Joplin Carnegie Library =

- U.S. National Register of Historic Places
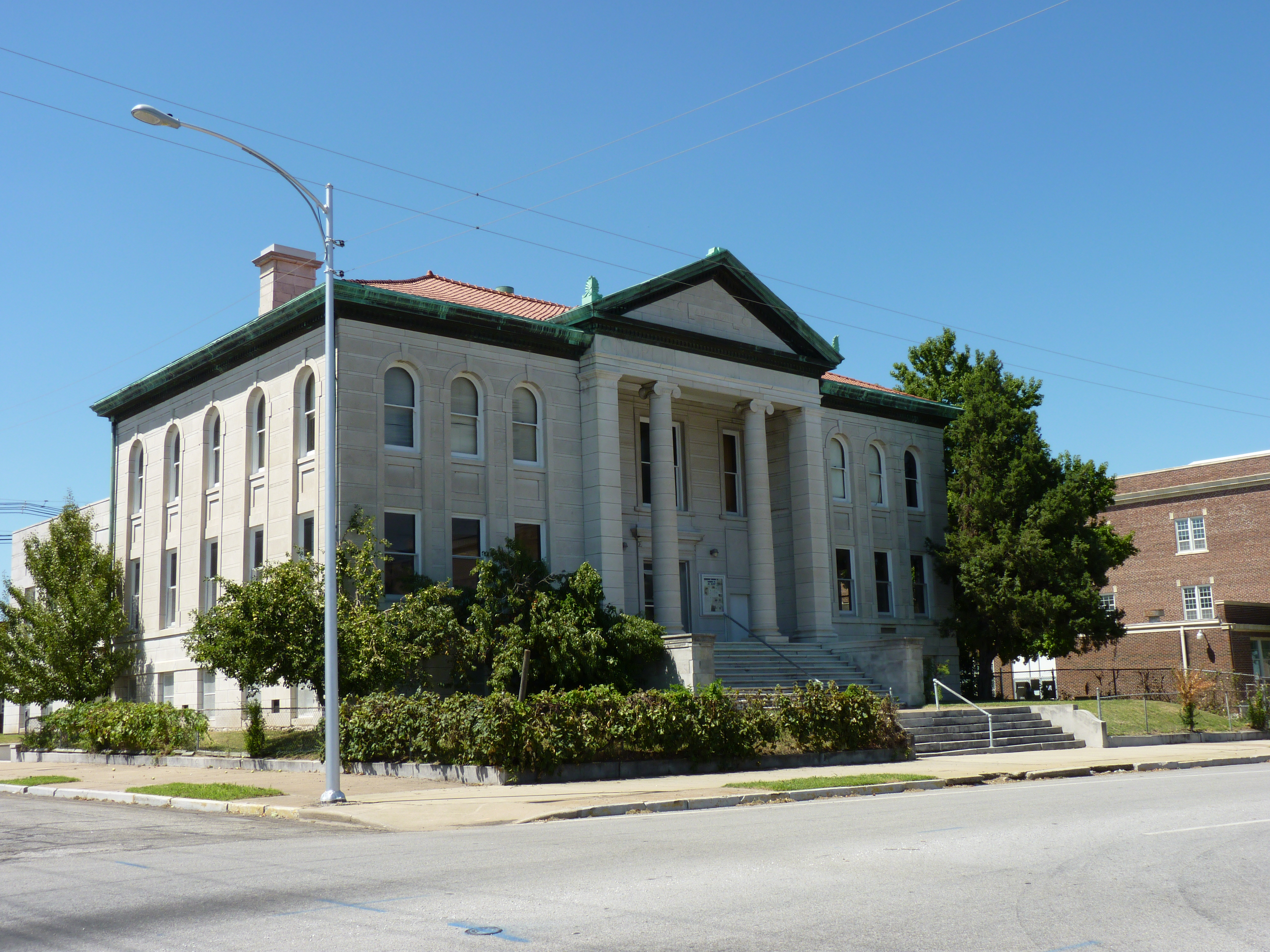

- Location within Missouri Location within the United States
- Location: 9th and Wall Sts., Joplin, Missouri
- Coordinates: 37°4′55″N 94°30′57″W
- Area: less than one acre
- Built: 1902
- Architect: Michaelis, August C.
- Architectural style: Classical Revival
- NRHP reference No.: 79001377
- Added to NRHP: July 10, 1979

The Joplin Carnegie Library is a historic Carnegie library located at Joplin, Jasper County, Missouri. It was built in 1902, and is a two-story, Classical Revival style steel frame building sheathed in brick and white Carthage marble. On July 16, 1901 Andrew Carnegie provided $60,000 for its construction. It measures 79 feet by 86 feet and features a pedimented Ionic order porch which is distyle in antis. A four-bay two story addition was added in 1916.Andrew Carnegie provided $40,000 for its construction.

It was listed on the National Register of Historic Places in 1979.
