= St. Peter the Apostle Catholic Church and Rectory =

Historic church in Missouri, United States

- U.S. National Register of Historic Places
- U.S. Historic district
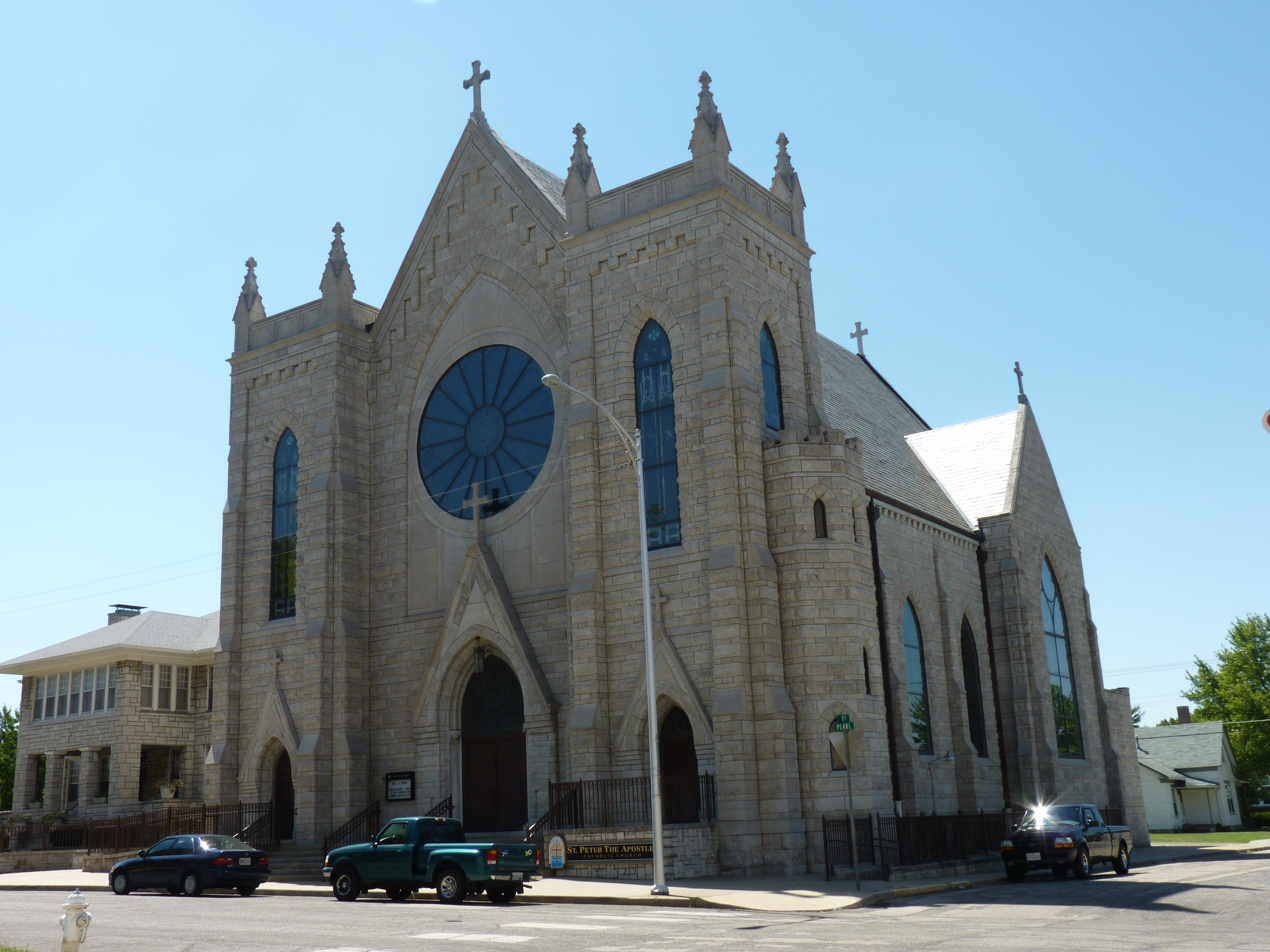
- Saint Peter the Apostle Catholic Church exterior

- Location within Missouri Location within the United States
- Location: 812 Pearl St., Joplin, Missouri
- Coordinates: 37°3′57″N 94°31′11″W
- Area: less than one acre
- Built: 1906, 1917
- Architect: Allen, Austin; Brown, W.E.
- Architectural style: Late Gothic Revival, Prairie School
- NRHP reference No.: 91000851
- Added to NRHP: June 28, 1991

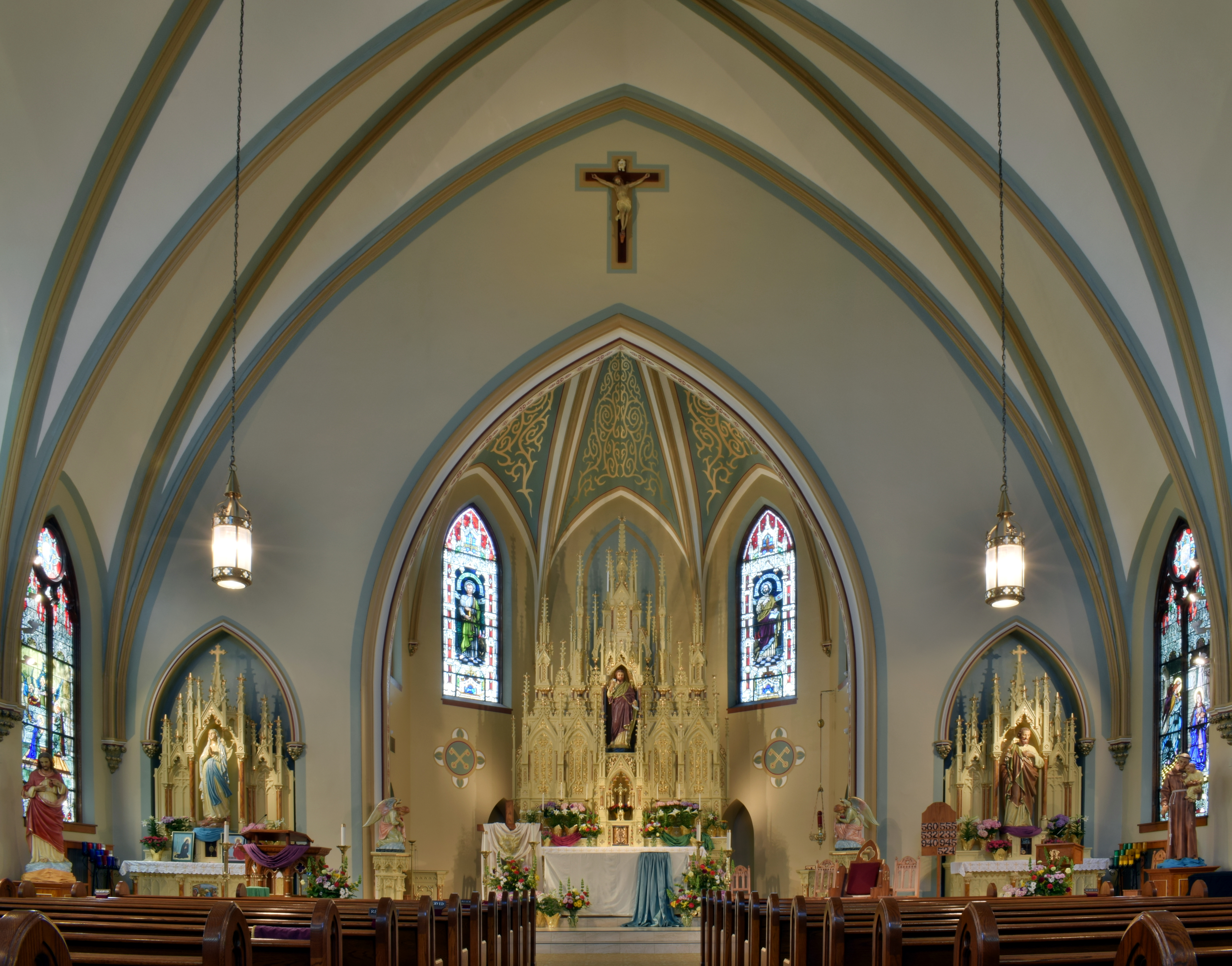
Interior with Easter decoration

St. Peter the Apostle Catholic Church and Rectory is a historic Catholic church complex at 812 Pearl Street in Joplin, Jasper County,, Missouri.

The church was built in 1906, and is a Late Gothic Revival style building constructed of Carthage limestone. It measures 63 feet, 6 inches, by 122 feet, 8 inches and features circular windows; tracery; Gothic arched windows and doors; and the triple portal entry.

The rectory was built in 1917, and is a two-story Prairie School-style dwelling with a finished basement. It is constructed of Carthage limestone and has a low pitched, hipped roof with wide overhang. Also on the property is a contributing concrete block garage.

It was listed on the National Register of Historic Places in 1991 as a national historic district.
