= Joplin History and Mineral Museum =

Museum in Joplin, Missouri

Joplin History & Mineral Museum
- Former names: Tri-State Mineral Museum, Dorothea B. Hoover Museum for Joplin
- Established: 1976
- Location: 504 S. Schifferdecker Avenue; Joplin, Missouri 64801
- Coordinates: 37.0876824°N 94.5531946°W
- Type: Natural history, local history
- Key holdings: Tri-State Mining District, National Cookie Cutter Collection
- Collections: History, mineral, Route 66
- Founders: Everett J. Ritchie (mineral) & Dorothea B. Hoover (history)
- Board President: Kelly Reddin
- Curator: Christopher Wiseman
- Website: joplin-museum.org

The Joplin History and Mineral Museum is an admission-charging museum of minerals, mining heritage, and local history. It is located in Schifferdecker Park on the west side of Joplin in the U.S. state of Missouri. The current museum is a consolidation of the Dorothea B. Hoover Museum, a collection dedicated to Joplin history that opened in 1976, and the Everett J. Ritchie Tri-State Mineral Museum, a collection of geological specimens oriented towards the production rock formations of the Missouri–Kansas–Oklahoma Tri-State district. Historically, this area was noted for the production of zinc and lead, and the current Museum reflects this. Adjacent to the museum is an open-air collection of historical mining equipment.

As of 2023, the museum stated they were undertaking a major project to refit the museum's outdated displays, some of which dated back to the 1970s. Displays include chained-down samples of lead ore, which museum visitors are invited to try to lift.
