= Freeman Health System =

Geography
- Location: Joplin, Missouri, United States

Organization
- Care system: Private
- Type: Community
- Affiliated university: Kansas City University of Medicine and Biosciences

Services
- Emergency department: Level II for Trauma certification
- Beds: 460

History
- Opened: 1922

Links
- Website: https://www.freemanhealth.com/
- Lists: Hospitals in Missouri

Freeman Health System is a three-hospital network in Joplin, Newton County, Missouri, USA. Freeman operates two campuses in Joplin and a satellite hospital in Neosho, Missouri. The largest hospital in the system, Freeman West, is a 339-bed teaching hospital with a 41-bed ICU. With over 3000 employees, the hospital system is the largest employer in the Joplin area.

== History ==
Freeman Hospital was founded in 1922 by John W. Freeman at 2008 Sergeant Avenue. In 1958, it moved to the East 34th Street location now known as Freeman East. Its main facility, the Freeman West campus at 1102 West 32nd Street, was added in 1975.

In 1977, Freeman became the first hospital to use ultrasound in diagnostic services and nuclear medicine. In 2007, Freeman West expanded its complex to include a six-story annex to its two-story main building, the Gary and Donna Hall Tower.

== 2011 Joplin tornado ==
Freeman's role in the aftermath of the 2011 Joplin tornado was crucial to the community, treating more than 1700 injured patients, more than half within the first day. The hospital only narrowly escaped the almost mile-wide path of complete destruction across the southern half of the city, being just six blocks south of the storm-ravaged St. John's Regional Medical Center (now known as Mercy Hospital Joplin). Freeman itself sustained some damage to its facilities, losing a portion of its roof. Following its competitor's nearby relocation and reconstruction, the two hospitals are now more than a mile apart.

== Other ==
Freeman is a Meditech hospital. It is also part of the Children's Miracle Network Hospitals group. The current President/CEO is Paula Baker.
