= Joplin Public Library =

- 37°5′17″N 94°30′49″W
- Location: 1901 East 20th Street, Joplin, Missouri, United States, 64804
- Established: 1902

Other information
- Website: joplinpubliclibrary.org

The Joplin Public Library is the public library system for Joplin, Missouri.

As the largest public library between Springfield and Tulsa, the Joplin Public Library District attracts users from the tri-state area. The collection includes approximately 115,000 items in print and non-print format. The Library is open 66 hours a week, including evenings and Saturday and Sunday.

The Joplin Public Library District is a Special District, as are all library districts in Missouri. In Jasper County, the library district includes all property within the Joplin city limits. In Newton County, the library district includes only that portion of the City of Joplin which was within the city limits on October 13, 1965.

== History ==
The Joplin Public Library District was established in 1902 when the citizens of Joplin, Missouri voted for a 10-cent tax to operate a public library. A Carnegie Foundation grant of $40,000 paid for the construction of a library building, with the community's having raised money to provide operating and maintenance funds. The Carnegie Library was built at 9th Street and Wall Avenue and was listed on the National Register of Historic Places later in the 20th century.

As needs outgrew the space, in 1980 the city built the current library at 300 S. Main Street, at a cost of approximately $2,000,000. The new library building was opened to the public in May 1981. In 1995 the building was remodeled and expanded to create the Rosemary Titus Reynolds Children’s Library, which was dedicated in March 1996. The building, which covers approximately 35,000 square feet (3,300 m^{2}), is fully handicapped-accessible.

The new library was built on the site of the historic Connor Hotel, which had to be demolished. On November 11, 1978, one day before the hotel was scheduled to be brought down by explosives, it collapsed and trapped three workers in the rubble. After being trapped for eighty-two hours, Alfred Sommers was successfully rescued. The two other workers were killed in the accident. The three-and-a-half-day ordeal captured the attention of the entire nation.

The Library automated all circulation and technical processing operations in 1992 with federal funding under the Library Services and Construction Act. Off-site dial-in access, also federally funded, became available in 1995. The following year the Library started offering free Internet access to patrons. In 1999, the Library introduced its Web site and provided access to its catalog on the Internet.

In 2013, the federal Economic Development Administration announced a $20 million grant for the development and construction of a new library on 20th Street, in the heart of the area destroyed by the 2011 Joplin tornado.

In June 2017, the new 58,000 square foot state-of-the art library opened to the public. Costing nearly $15,000,000, the new facility has meeting and event rooms and spaces, an outdoor plaza and courtyard, children's, teen and adult book collection areas, and makerspaces and equipment for creative arts and business innovators.

== Funding ==
The Joplin Public Library District is funded primarily by a combination of real estate taxes and commercial surtaxes. Library-generated revenues and a city general fund subsidy also support the Library’s operations. In 1993, Joplin voters approved an increase in the library levy from 9¢ to 20¢ per $100 valuation. Statewide reassessments since 1993 have resulted in several rollbacks, reducing the levy to 15.45¢. In 2006, voters approved a 10¢ levy increase, bringing the total levy to 25.45¢ for that year. The levy will continue to decrease annually due to rollbacks.
