= Thomas Jefferson Independent Day School =

Location
- Joplin, Missouri; 37°05′58″N 94°28′14″W

Information
- School type: Private, Independent
- Founded: 1993
- Faculty: 55
- Enrollment: 345 coed students
- Campus type: Rural
- Colors: Purple and Gold
- Mascot: Cavalier
- Website: https://www.tjeffschool.org

Thomas Jefferson Independent Day School is an independent, liberal arts, college prep private school in Joplin, Missouri, USA.

== School history ==
Thomas Jefferson Independent Day School opened in August 1993 with grades Pre-School-9 and 185 students. The school's first Upper School graduating class was the Class of 1997, and the school has graduated 25 classes, with more than 450 graduates. The school has a college prep liberal arts program, and all graduates have matriculated to colleges or universities following graduation. Thomas Jefferson graduates have matriculated to a wide range of colleges and universities. The school employs 45 full-time teachers. Laura McDonald was named Head of School in June 2018. Thomas Jefferson is accredited by Independent Schools Association of the Central States (ISACS).

== Academics ==
In the Upper School, Thomas Jefferson offers 18 Advanced Placement courses including: Biology; Chemistry; Calculus AB; Calculus BC; Computer Science; Government and Politics; English Language and Composition; English Literature and Composition; Latin; European History; Music Theory; Physics; Spanish Language; Spanish Literature; Statistics; and U.S. History.

== Athletics ==
Thomas Jefferson is a member of the Missouri State High School Activities Association (MSHSAA) and competes in the Ozark 7 Conference. Other schools participating in the Ozark 7 Conference include: McAuley Catholic High School, Southwest, Wheaton, Verona, Exeter, and Purdy.

Students in grades 6-12 are able to compete in:

Fall: soccer (coed), tennis (upper school girls), volleyball (girls), cross-country (coed), Swimming (boys)

Winter: basketball (boys and girls), cheerleading (coed), swimming (girls)

Spring: golf (upper school coed), tennis (upper school boys), track and field (boys and girls)

== Student activities ==
The school's quiz bowl program has competed at NAQT Nationals, as well as finishing in the top three at the Class 1 state level since 1997, winning the championship in 2002, 2003, 2005, 2006, 2007, 2008, 2013, 2014, 2016, and 2017. The school offers students the ability to participate in contests for math, writing, foreign languages, music, art, geography, and spelling. The school offers foreign language clubs, a chess club, a film-making club, and several other extracurricular and cocurricular activities. The school's arts programs put on middle school, high school, and lower school musicals every year. Past musicals have included Curtains, Anything Goes, The Music Man, Hello, Dolly!, “Bye Bye Birdie", "Fiddler on the Roof," Les Miserables," and "Legally Blonde: The Musical." The Middle and Upper School orchestras and vocal ensembles have more than 70 percent of Middle and Upper School students participating.

The Upper School Vocal Ensemble was selected to be part of a 200-voice choir that would perform Faure's "Requiem" at Carnegie Hall on June 7, 2015. The ensemble was scheduled to return to Carnegie Hall in 2020, but this was canceled due to the COVID-19 pandemic. In March 2015, the school began an annual film festival open to area students in grades 6-12, with over 40 films being entered.
