= Norma Lee Clark =

American actress and writer (1927–2002)

- Born: 1927; Jefferson City, Missouri, U.S.
- Died: November 8, 2002 (aged 74–75)
- Occupation: Actress

Norma Lee Clark (1927 – 8 November 2002) was an American actress and author of romance novels who worked for over 30 years as the private secretary and assistant to filmmaker Woody Allen.

== Biography ==
Clark, born in Jefferson City, Missouri, began her acting career with the Pittsburgh Children's Theater and also worked at the Rochester Arena Theater before moving to New York City in the late 1940s. She moved there to take the female lead in Captain Video and His Video Rangers, a television series that ran from 1949 to 1955. She may have been the first recurrent female science fiction lead in television; significant, but early television history of the defunct Dumont network identified only a few of the actors, and the exact transmission dates are not known.

During her decades as Woody Allen's assistant, she wrote 15 Regency romance novels, including The Infamous Rake, The Daring Duchess, and The Impulsive Miss Pymbroke. The "most popular" of her novels was Lady Jane. She sometimes published under the name Megan O'Connor.

She was married to lighting designer David Clark, and had two daughters, Megan and Emily. The couple later divorced. Afterwards, she remarried to Dimitri Vassilopoulos.
